= Green Lane Rapidway =

Planned bus extension in Ontario, Canada

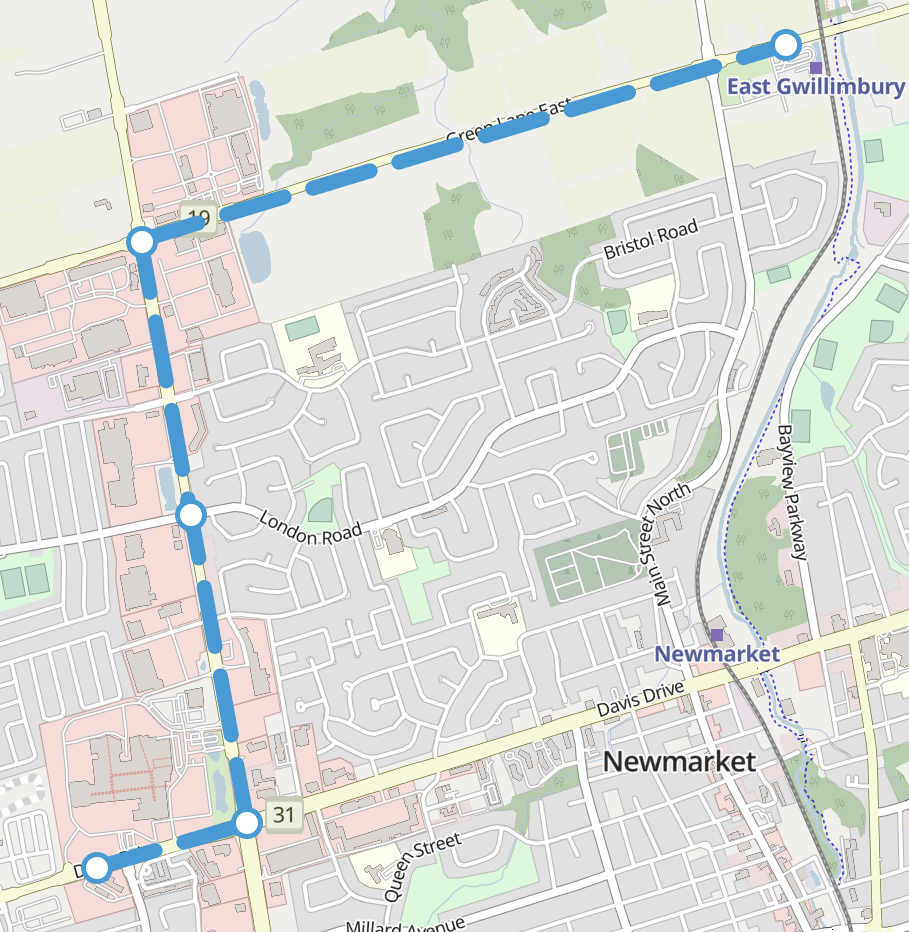
- Proposed route and stops

Overview
- System: Viva Rapid Transit
- Operator: York Region Transit
- Vehicle: TBD
- Status: Proposed

Route
- Route type: Rapidway
- Locale: York Region, Ontario (Newmarket)
- Start: Newmarket Terminal
- End: East Gwillimbury GO
- Length: 8.1 km (5.0 mi)
- Stations: 5 (planned)

The Green Lane Rapidway is a proposed bus rapid transit extension in Newmarket and East Gwillimbury, Ontario. It does not have a committed schedule under the Vivanext plan. It is listed in Metrolinx's regional transportation for the Greater Toronto and Hamilton Area, The Big Move under the 25-year plan. It will extend from Davis Drive (Regional Road 31) west of Yonge, then north along Yonge Street (York Regional Road 1) from Davis Drive to Green Lane, then from Yonge Street in the west along Green Lane East (Regional Road 19) to the East Gwillimbury GO Station just east of Main Street North (Regional Road 34) in the east.

== Stations ==
Yonge Street from Davis Drive to Green Lane and Green Lane from Yonge Street to GO station will need to be widened to accommodate platforms and dedicated bus lanes. The following stops were included in the initial design:

- Newmarket Terminal
- Davis Drive (at Yonge Street)
- Bonshaw Avenue (at Yonge Street)
- Green Lane North (at Yonge Street)
- East Gwillimbury GO Station (east of Main Street North)
