= Viva Yellow =

Line on the Viva bus rapid transit system

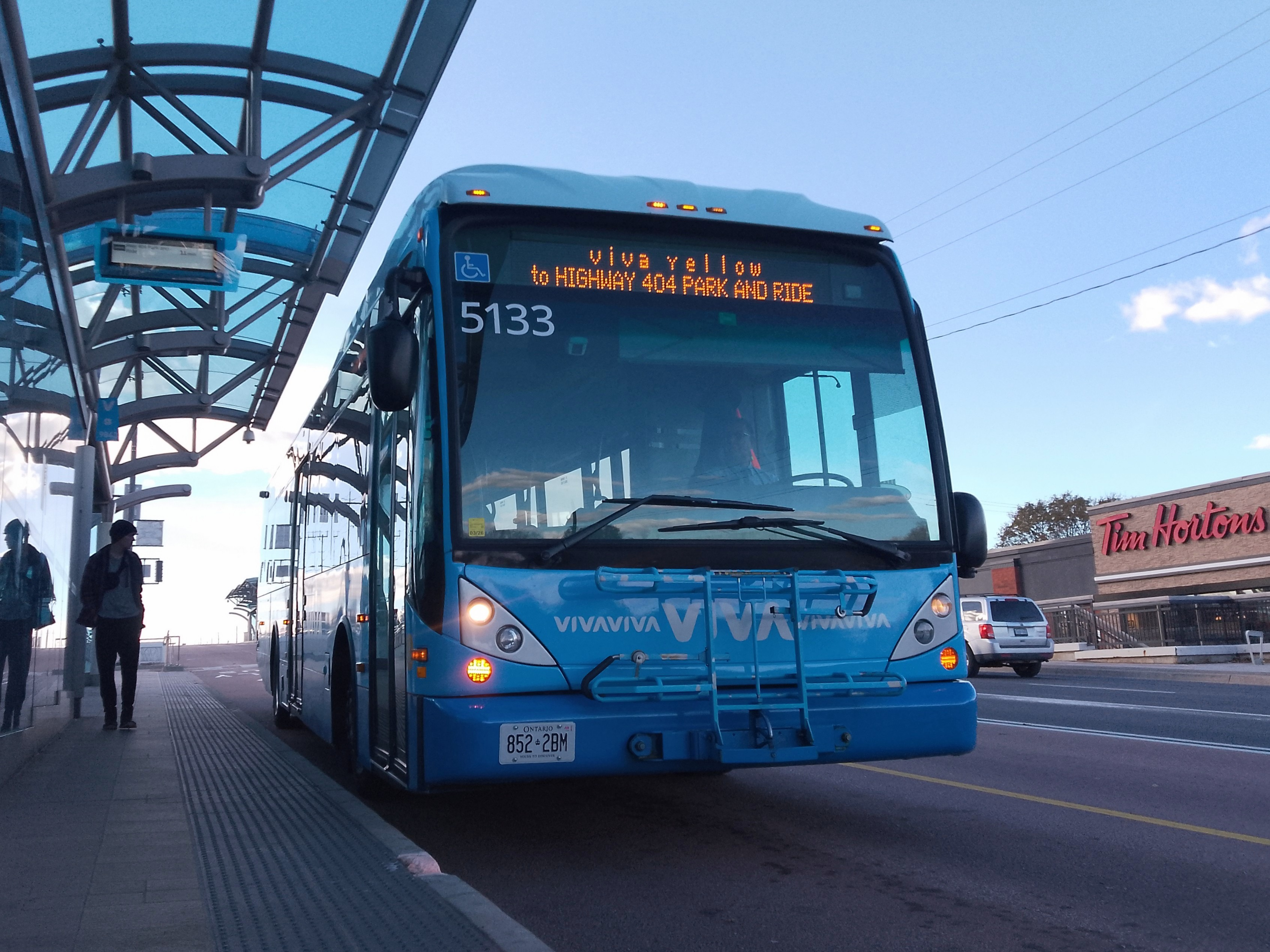

Overview
- System: YRT/Viva
- Operator: Tok Transit
- Vehicle: Van Hool A330; New Flyer XD40
- Began service: November 29, 2015

Route
- Route type: Bus rapid transit
- Locale: York Region
- Communities served: Newmarket
- Start: Newmarket Bus Terminal
- End: Highway 404
- Length: 3.5 miles (5.6 km)
- Stops: 7

Service
- Frequency: 15 to 23 mins

Viva Yellow (internally designated as route 607) or the Davis Drive corridor line, is a Viva bus rapid transit line that serves Newmarket, Ontario, Canada on the Davis Drive Rapidway. This route is within York Region Transit's North Division, and is operated by Tok Transit under contract from York Region. It is also the most recent out of all the Viva Rapid Transit lines, having opened in 2015.

== Route description ==
Viva Yellow runs east–west on Davis Drive between Yonge Street and Highway 404. The route is less than 6 kilometres long, the shortest line in the Viva system.

There are seven stations on the Viva Yellow line. From west to east they are:

Viva Yellow
Name	Opening date	Town	Major connections
Newmarket Terminal	November 29, 2015	Newmarket	Viva Blue GO Transit bus services
Longford	November 29, 2015	Newmarket	
Main	November 29, 2015	Newmarket	Newmarket GO
Southlake	November 29, 2015	Newmarket	
Huron Heights	November 29, 2015	Newmarket	
Leslie	November 29, 2015	Newmarket	
Highway 404	November 29, 2015	Newmarket	Davis Drive

== Rapidway ==
The majority of Viva Yellow's route runs along the Davis Drive Rapidway which is a bus-only lane that occupies the centre lanes of Davis Drive. The rapidway extends 2.6 kilometres from Yonge Street to the Southlake Regional Health Centre.

== History ==
York Region had identified a number of corridors where higher-order transit would be necessary to address population and employment growth. Davis Drive is the main east-west corridor serving the Town of Newmarket. Before Viva Yellow, it boasted one of the more frequent YRT routes for a town its size, as route 55 ran no less than every 40 minutes at all times.

With Newmarket dedicated as an urban growth centre in the Places to Grow Act, Davis Drive was chosen as an intensification corridor, similar to Highway 7 in Vaughan, Richmond Hill, and Markham. The project included the widening of Davis Drive, transit-oriented development along the corridor, and new rapidway lanes west of Huron Heights Drive.
