= Musselman Lake, Ontario =

Musselman's Lake Musselman Lake
- Unincorporated community
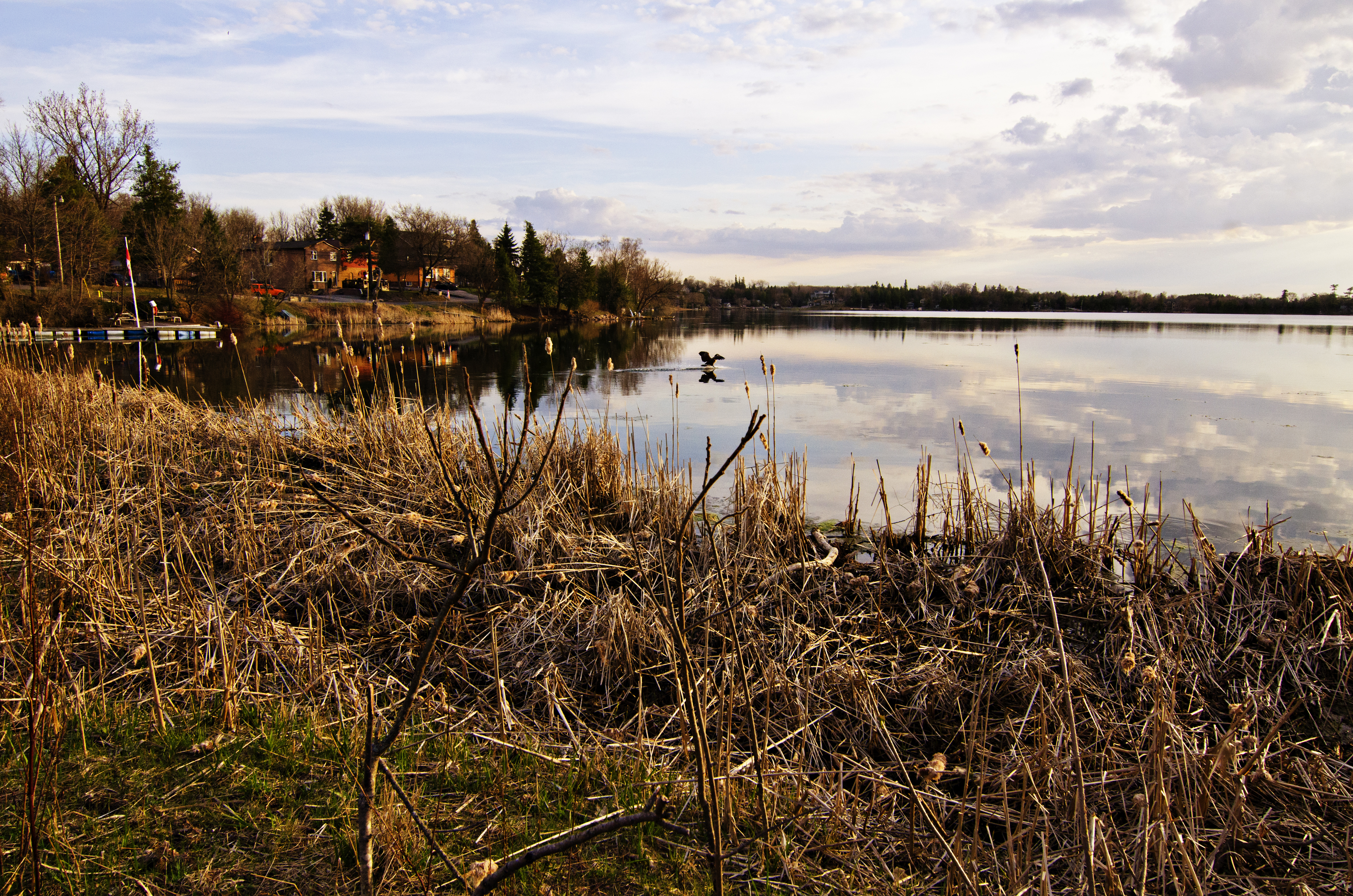
- Interactive map of Musselman's Lake
- Coordinates: 44°1′51″N 79°16′23″W
- Country: Canada
- Province: Ontario
- Regional municipality: York Region
- Town: Whitchurch–Stouffville
- Amalgamation: (With Town of Stouffville); 1 January 1971

Government
  - Type: Municipality
  - Mayor: Iain Lovatt
  - Councillor: Maurice Smith (Ward 2)
- Elevation: 334 m (1,096 ft)
- Time zone: UTC−5 (EST)
  - Summer (DST): UTC−4 (EDT)
- Forward sortation area: L4A
- Area codes: 905 and 289
- NTS Map: 031D03
- GNBC Code: FDLCI

Musselman's Lake is a community settled adjacent to a 118-acre (0.48 km^{2}) kettle lake of the same name in the town of Whitchurch–Stouffville, Ontario, Canada. It is located about 6 km north-northwest of urban Stouffville, and is part of the Greater Toronto Area.

It is accessible from Highway 48, which links Toronto to Beaverton, and from Highway 404, a limited-access 400-Series Highway 9 kilometres (5.6 mi) west of Musselman's Lake via Aurora Road or Bloomington Road. Ontario Highway 407 is located about 20 kilometres (12 mi) south on Ninth Line in Markham. The main roads in the community are Ninth Line on the west side of the lake, and Lakeshore Road on the east. The area around the lake is dotted with a number of smaller kettle lakes, including Island Lake, Shadow Lake, Staley Lake and Windsor Lake. The area around Musselman's Lake feeds a small tributary to the East Holland River, which flows to the west.

== Environment ==
Musselman's Lake is on the ecologically sensitive Oak Ridges Moraine; the land drains into both the Lake Ontario and Lake Simcoe watersheds. Pine trees dominate much of the area, with farmland toward the north-east. Creeks and streams are also characteristic of the area.

Sand and gravel mining is widespread to the south and east of Musselman's Lake. The mining industry began in the 1950s and continues through the present. Lee Sand & Gravel has been in operations since the 1950s and owned by Crupi Group since 1987. Lafarge has operations next to Lee on the east side along York-Durham Townline.

Residential areas are concentrated around Musselman's Lake and Windsor Lake, and on a few other large lots. The Town of Whitchurch-Stouffville forecasts the population of Musselman's Lake to decline slightly between 2012 and 2031.

The lake has a surface area of 118-acre (0.48 km^{2}), with a maximum depth of approximately 27-foot (8.2 m). It is landlocked and fed by springs and surface runoff.

In 2009, the Musselman's Lake Subwatershed Assessment and Stewardship Opportunities Report recognized that the water quality of the lake was "impaired" and "degraded," and had declined since 1989 when a similar study had been done.

A variety of fish have been found in the lake, including:

- Northern pike
- Large mouth bass
- Rock bass
- Sunfish (Centrarchidae)
- Crappie
- Suckers
- Channel catfish
- Perch (yellow perch)

== History ==
The area was first settled in 1807 by Peter and Jacob Musselman, Mennonites from Pennsylvania. The Musselmans established a steam saw mill on the west side of the lake on land later acquired by William Osborn.

The Glen Baker Hotel and Hall provided local entertainment until 1928 and again until the 1970s.

In the 1950s and 1960s, housing developments were built around Musselman's Lake.

Over the years, the community has been referred to both as Musselman's Lake and Musselman Lake. In 2012, the Town of Whitchurch-Stouffville officially declared the name of the community as "Musselman's Lake."

On June 17, 2017, the five-acre Coultice Park was officially opened. This land was formerly a part of the Wagon Wheel Ranch, and was donated to the town by the Coultice family.

== Privately owned waterfront ==
Virtually all of the waterfront in the community of Musselman's Lake is private residential property. Cedar Beach Park is a small park and beach on the north side at Cedarvale Boulevard, and Ninth Line is privately-run and requires admission. Docks along the lake are all private, with Cedar Beach Park open to the paying public, but not for daily visitors.

Use of the lake and its shorelines is regulated by the Department of Fisheries and Oceans Canada in conjunction with the Lake Simcoe Region Conservation Authority; the Ministry of Natural Resources governs fishing regulations, town by-laws regulate the use of power boats on the lake, and laws are enforced by the York Regional Police Marine Unit. While the resources of all levels of government are used for the regulation, protection and preservation of the lake, the entire perimeter of the lake is currently in a few private hands, and homeowners and business alone benefit from exclusive access rights to one of Whitchurch-Stouffville's most significant natural and recreational assets.

== Nearest communities ==
Musselman's Lake is situated near the eastern boundary of the town of Whitchurch-Stouffville. Neighbouring communities within Whitchurch–Stouffville include Ballantrae to the north-east and Bloomington to the south. Goodwood, a community of the town of Uxbridge, lies to the east.
