= Davis Drive Rapidway =

Bus rapid transit line in Newmarket, Canada

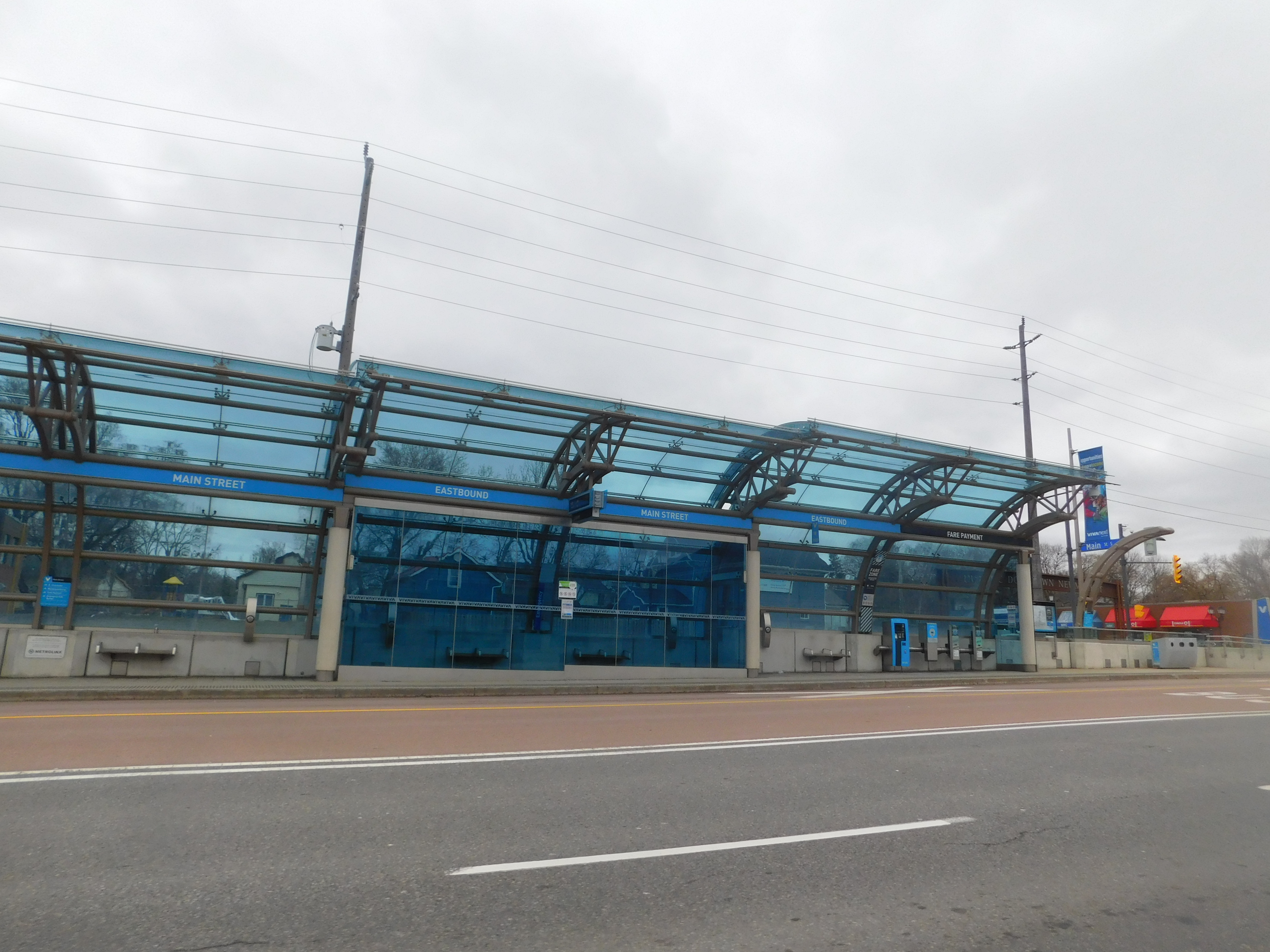
- A Davis Drive Rapidway station

Overview
- System: Viva Rapid Transit
- Operator: York Region Transit
- Status: Active
- Began service: November 29, 2015

Route
- Route type: Bus rapid transit
- Locale: York Region, Ontario (Newmarket)
- Start: Newmarket Bus Terminal
- End: Huron Heights Drive
- Length: 2.7 km (1.7 mi)
- Stations: 3

The Davis Drive Rapidway is a Canadian bus rapid transit system in Newmarket, Ontario, built by Vivanext. The rapidway opened for service on November 29, 2015. The Viva Yellow service uses the rapidway. Total budget amount for the Davis Drive rapidway was CA$267,700,000, not including an additional CA$31,000,000 in land acquisitions.

The 2.7 kilometres (1.7 mi) Davis Drive rapidway extends from Yonge Street in the west, to Huron Heights Drive in the east.

In November 2009, pre-construction activities, such as utility relocation, planning and geotechnical investigations began for the Davis Drive rapidway. Additional pre-construction activities, such as soil testing, archaeological assessments, building demolition, and removal or relocation of light poles and signs continued through to the end of 2010.

The route required expropriation of land from 133 property owners, most involving "slivers of land." Twenty-two lots of land were purchased, and 34 property owners had not yet settled as of March 2015. As part of construction, two heritage buildings known together as the "Union Hotel" at the corner of Main Street and Davis Drive had to be moved.

== Stations ==
Each station has a glass canopy and enclosed waiting area. For accessibility, each platform is level with bus floors. Stations are equipped with Presto card readers, interactive security monitoring and cameras, and electronic signs reporting next-bus information.

Station	Opened	City / Town	Service
Newmarket Terminal	N/A	Newmarket	Viva Yellow
Longford	November 29, 2015	Newmarket	Viva Yellow
Main	November 29, 2015	Newmarket	Viva Yellow
Southlake	November 29, 2015	Newmarket	Viva Yellow
Huron Heights	TBA	Newmarket	Viva Yellow
Leslie	TBA	Newmarket	Viva Yellow
Highway 404	N/A	Newmarket	Viva Yellow
