= List of mayors of Newmarket, Ontario =

This is a list of the mayors of the town of Newmarket, Ontario as well as the reeves of the village by the same name.

== Reeves of the Village of Newmarket ==
- 1858: Donald Sutherland
- 1859: Dr. James Hunter
- 1860: Donald Sutherland
- 1861: Dr. James Hunter
- 1862: Dr. Thomas Pyne
- 1863 - 1866: Alfred Boultbee
- 1867: Dr. James Hunter
- 1868: Samuel Roadhouse
- 1869 - 1870: Nelson Gorham
- 1871 - 1875: Erastus Jackson
- 1876: William Ashworth
- 1877 - 1880: Erastus Jackson

== Mayors of the Town of Newmarket ==
- 1881 - 1889 William Cane
- 1890 - 1891 Erastus Jackson
- 1891 - 1893 Col. T.H. Lloyd
- 1894 - 1896 T.J. Robertson
- 1897 - 1904 H.S. Cane
- 1905 - 1907 N.J. Roadhouse
- 1908 - 1911 P.W. Pearson
- 1912 - 1913 E.S. Cane
- 1913 - 1914 Lt.Col. J.A.W. Allan
- 1917 - 1921 W.H. Eves
- 1922 - 1924 W.H.S. Cane
- 1925 - 1926 J.E. Nesbitt
- 1927 - A. Brock Currey
- 1928 - 1930 A.J. Davis
- 1931 - 1933 J.E. Nesbitt
- 1934 - 1941 Dr. S.J. Boyd
- 1942 - 1947 Dr. Lowell Dales
- 1947 - 1953 Joseph Vale
- 1954 - 1957 Herbert Gladman
- 1958 - 1959 Alexander Beligin
- 1960 - 1961 James Otton
- 1962 - 1966 Bert Kent
- 1967 - 1968 Andrew Doak
- 1969 - 1970 Thomas Surgeoner
- 1971 - 1978 Robert Forhan
- 1979 to Feb 19, 1979 Robert Scott
- 1979 - 1994 Ray Twinney
- 1994 - 1997 John Cole
- 1997 - 2006 Tom Taylor
- 2007 - 2018 Tony Van Bynen
- 2018 - present John Taylor
