= Newmarket GO Station =

Train station in Newmarket, Ontario

Newmarket
- Station platform in 2024

General information
- Location: 465 Davis Drive; Newmarket, Ontario; Canada
- Coordinates: 44°03′38″N 79°27′37″W
- Owner: Metrolinx
- Platforms: 1 side platform
- Tracks: Single track
- Bus routes: 65 68
- Connections: York Region Transit

Construction
- Parking: 265 spaces

Other information
- Station code: GO Transit: NE
- Fare zone: 64

History
- Opened: 1900; 126 years ago

Services
Preceding station	GO Transit	Following station
East Gwillimbury towards Allandale Waterfront	Barrie	Aurora towards Union
Former services
Preceding station	Via Rail	Following station
Barrie toward Vancouver	The Canadian before 1997	Toronto Terminus
Barrie toward Vancouver	Super Continental	St. Clair Avenue toward Toronto
Preceding station	Canadian National Railway	Following station
Holland Landing toward North Bay	North Bay – Toronto	Aurora toward Toronto
Location

Newmarket GO Station is a train and bus station in the GO Transit network located in the Old Davis Tannery Centre on the north side of Davis Drive East in Newmarket, Ontario, Canada, and is a stop on the Barrie line train service. It is a little over two kilometres east of the Newmarket Bus Terminal, at Davis Drive West and Eagle Street, which is a terminus for GO Bus, York Region Transit and Viva BRT services.

== History ==
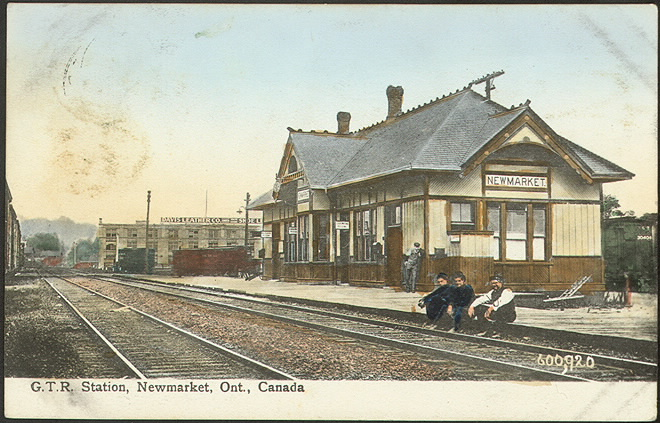
Postcard of the GTR station in 1910

In 1853, the Ontario, Simcoe and Huron Railway opened the line between Toronto and Collingwood which was acquired by the Grand Trunk Railway in 1888 and later merged into the Canadian National Railway.

Newmarket railway station was built on the south side of Davis Drive by the Grand Trunk Railway in 1900. The original NRC station was subsequently repurposed as a freight shed. The second station building is a one-storey wood clad stick frame building with board and batten siding associated with the Carpenter Gothic style. The west side has a projecting bay window flanked by waiting rooms, originally the south room for women and the north room for men.

The station building was designated a municipal heritage building in 1987 under the Ontario Heritage Act, and as a federal heritage building in 1992 under the Heritage Railway Stations Protection Act.

The GO Transit Barrie line is now owned by Metrolinx and the historic Grand Trunk Railway station is owned by the Town of Newmarket.

A platform extension and repair project began in March 2014. It also includes the rehabilitation of the parking lot, a new ticket booth with a customer waiting area and improved accessibility features.

== Services ==
Newmarket station has weekday service consisting of ten trains southbound to Union Station in the morning, a train northbound to Bradford in the early afternoon, seven trains northbound to Allandale Waterfront Station in the afternoon and two trains northbound to Bradford in the evening and night. At other times, GO bus route 68 operates hourly between Barrie Allandale Transit Terminal and Aurora GO Station where passengers can connect to the all-day train service to Toronto.

Weekend train service consists of three trains southbound to Union station in the morning and three trains returning northbound in the afternoon and evening. At other times, the station is served by GO bus route 68 which operates hourly between Barrie Allandale Transit Terminal and Aurora GO Station, where passengers can transfer to the all-day weekend train service toward Toronto.

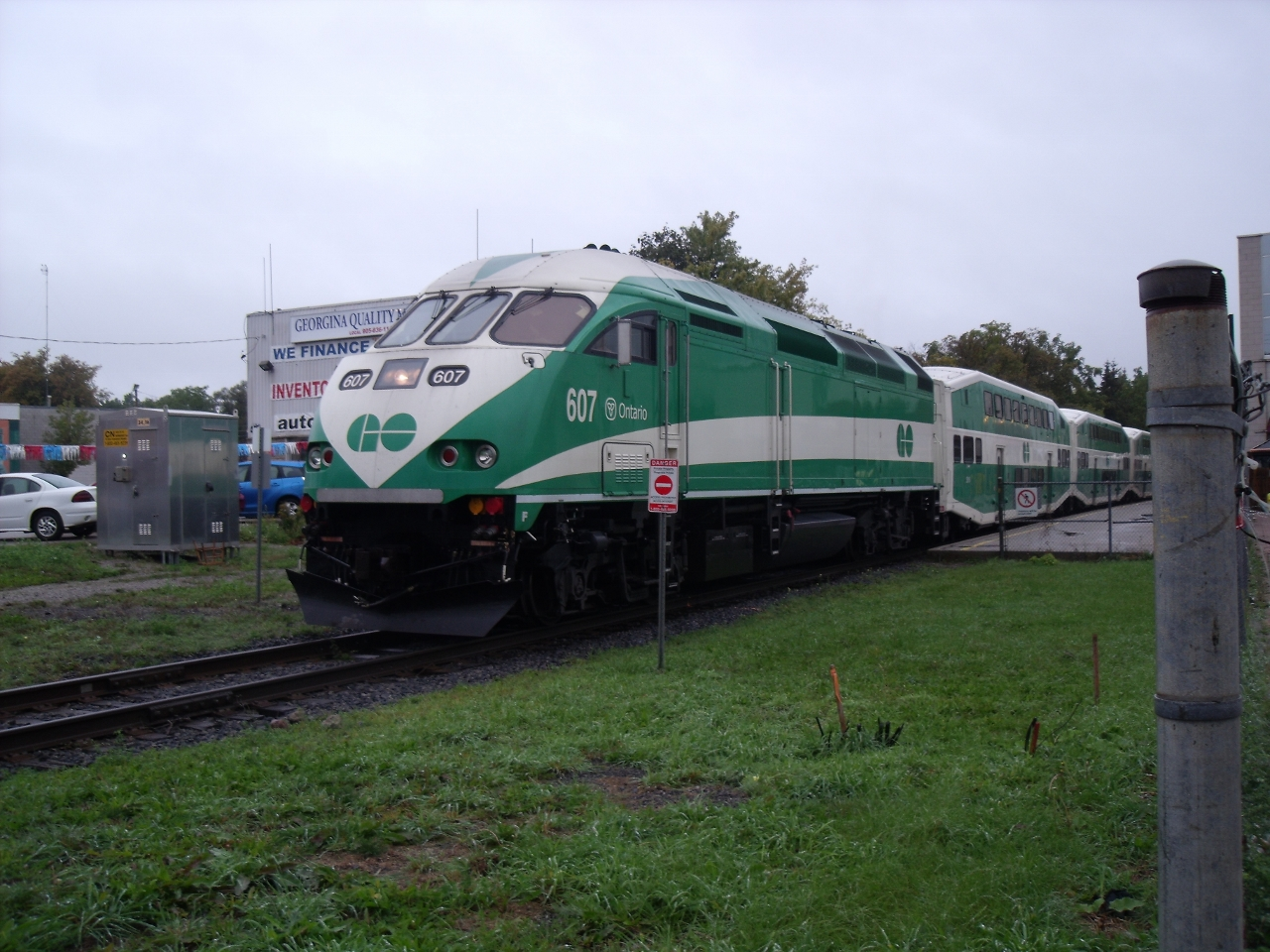
MP40PH powered train at Newmarket

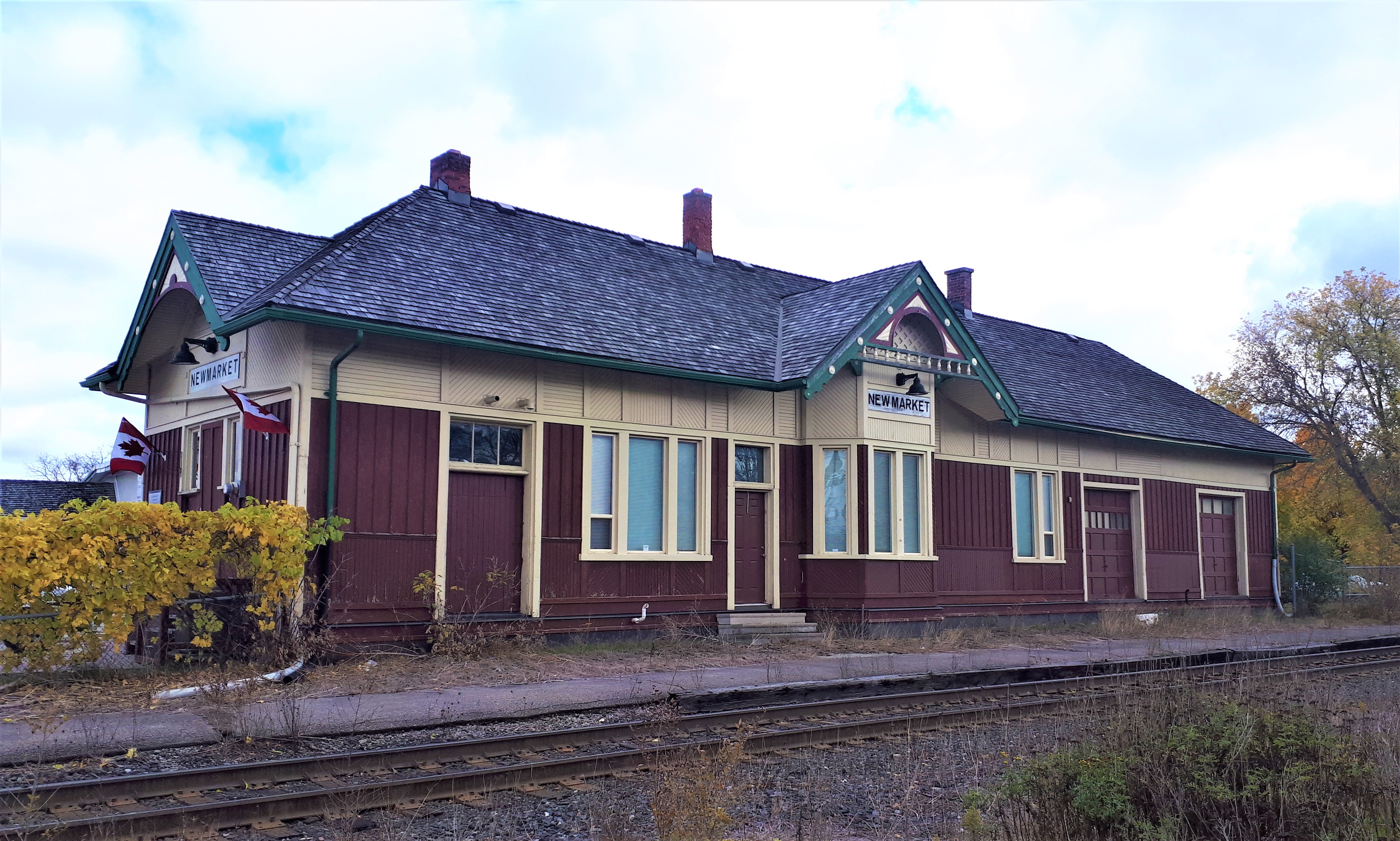
Newmarket Train Station-Chamber of Commerce

== Connecting buses ==
All buses serve the GO station from bus stops on Davis Drive and Main Street.

York Region Transit:

- 50 Queensway
- 54 Bayview
- 55 Davis Drive
- Viva Yellow

GO Transit:

- 65 Union Station Bus Terminal/Aurora GO Station/East Gwillimbury GO Station
- 65B Union Station Bus Terminal/East Gwillimbury GO Station
- 68 Aurora GO Station/East Gwillimbury GO Station/Barrie Allandale Transit Terminal
