= East Holland River =

Coordinates: 44.10505°N 79.49943°W

The East Holland River is a river in Ontario, Canada that is part of the Holland River watershed that empties into Cook's Bay in Lake Simcoe. The headwaters of the East Holland River rise in the Oak Ridges Moraine. The river runs generally north from the town of Newmarket, and through Holland Landing where it joins up with the West Holland River.

A map of the Holland River watershed published by the Lake Simcoe Region Conservation Authority shows tributaries to the East Holland River include Sharon Creek, Bogart Creek, Tannery Creek (from Aurora, Ontario), Western Creek (from the west side of Newmarket), and Weslie Creek.

A dam on the East Holland River in Newmarket maintains a man-made lake called Fairy Lake, originally a millpond, but now used for recreation. There has been a dam at this site since 1801. The current dam was damaged, albeit not severely, by Hurricane Hazel in 1954.

Musselman Lake in Whitchurch-Stouffville feeds a creek that runs along Vandorf Sideroad and into Weslie Creek.

Despite concerns of a lack of water, construction of several locks was started along the river between Newmarket and Holland Landing as part of a 'Holland River Canal' that would have joined Newmarket to the Trent-Severn Waterway. There is one lock in each of those places along with another at Rogers Reservoir in East Gwillimbury. Rogers Reservoir and Fairy Lake in Newmarket were to act as reservoirs for the canal waters. There were two swing bridges built in East Gwillimbury; one on Green Lane and the other on Main Street North (Concession 2). Both have been replaced by permanent structures. On Green Lane the road now runs slightly to the south and a pedestrian bridge crosses the old structure. There is also a quayside at Davis Drive in Newmarket. The canal works were abandoned early in the 20th century without ever being completed. The upper limit of navigation on the East Holland River remains at River Drive Park, about two km downstream from Holland Landing not far from the Marina RiverSports Recreation at Queensville Sideroad.

== See also ==
- List of rivers of Ontario
