= East Gwillimbury GO Station =

Train station in East Gwillimbury, Ontario

East Gwillimbury
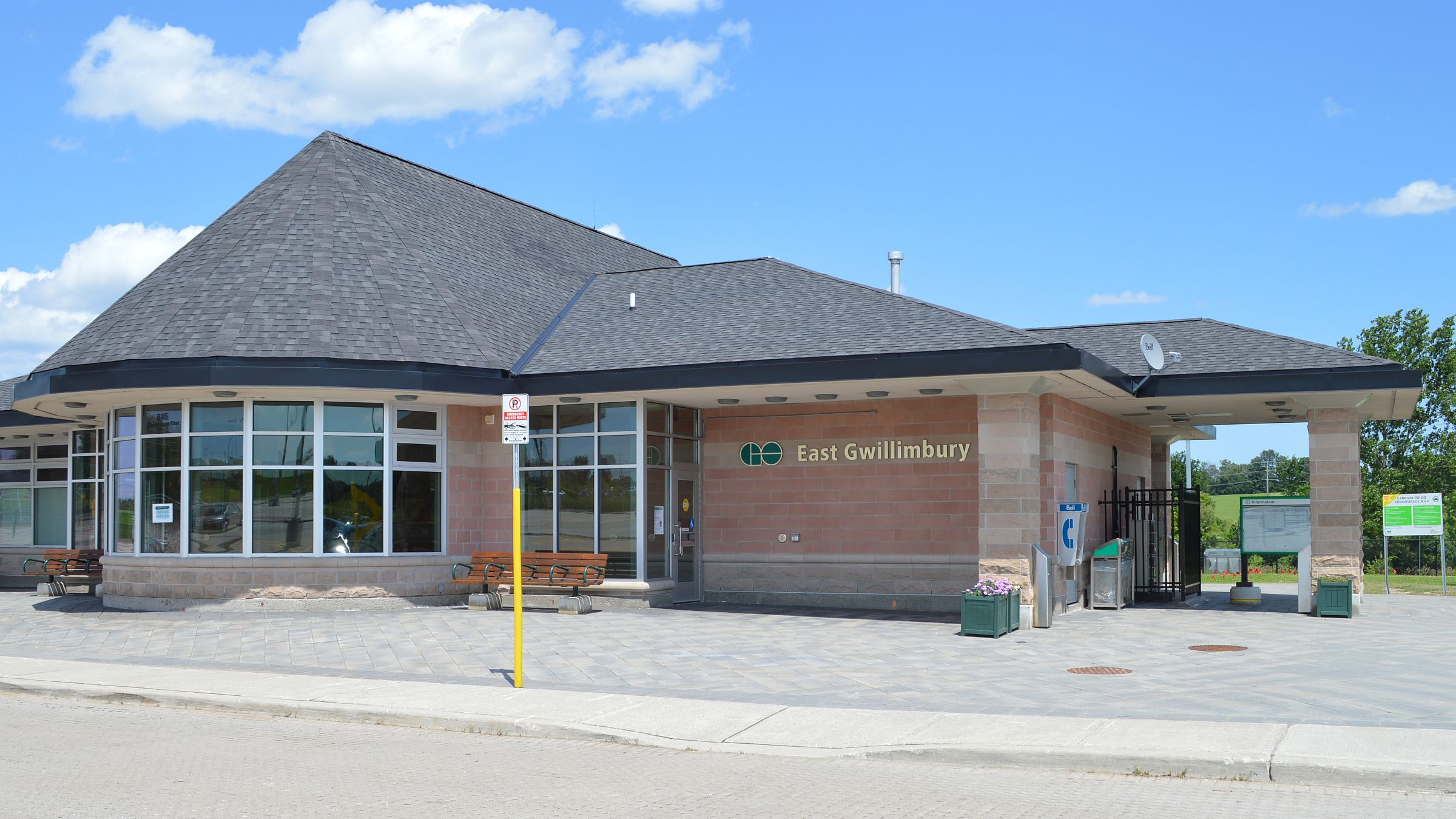
- Station building in 2013

General information
- Location: 845 Green Lane East; East Gwillimbury, Ontario; Canada
- Coordinates: 44°04′41″N 79°27′19″W
- Owner: Metrolinx
- Platforms: 1 side platform
- Tracks: 1
- Bus routes: 65 68
- Connections: York Region Transit

Construction
- Structure type: Brick station building
- Parking: 637 spaces
- Cycle facilities: Yes
- Accessible: Yes

Other information
- Station code: GO Transit: EA
- Fare zone: 44

History
- Opened: November 1, 2004; 22 years ago

Services
Preceding station	GO Transit	Following station
Bradford towards Allandale Waterfront	Barrie	Newmarket towards Union
Location

East Gwillimbury GO Station is a train and bus station in the GO Transit network located in East Gwillimbury, Ontario, Canada. It is a stop on the Barrie line train service. The station was opened on November 1, 2004.

== Services ==
East Gwillimbury station has weekday train service consisting of 10 trains southbound to Union Station in the morning, 1 train northbound to Bradford in the early afternoon, 7 trains northbound to Barrie in the afternoon and 2 trains northbound to Bradford in the evening and night. At other times, GO bus route 68 operates hourly between Barrie Allandale Transit Terminal and Aurora GO Station, where passengers can connect to the all-day train service to Toronto.

Weekend train service consists of 3 trains southbound to Union station in the morning and 3 trains returning northbound in the afternoon and evening. At other times, the station is served by GO bus route 68 which operates hourly between Barrie Allandale Transit Terminal and Aurora GO station, where passengers can transfer to the all-day weekend train service toward Toronto.

== Connecting transit ==
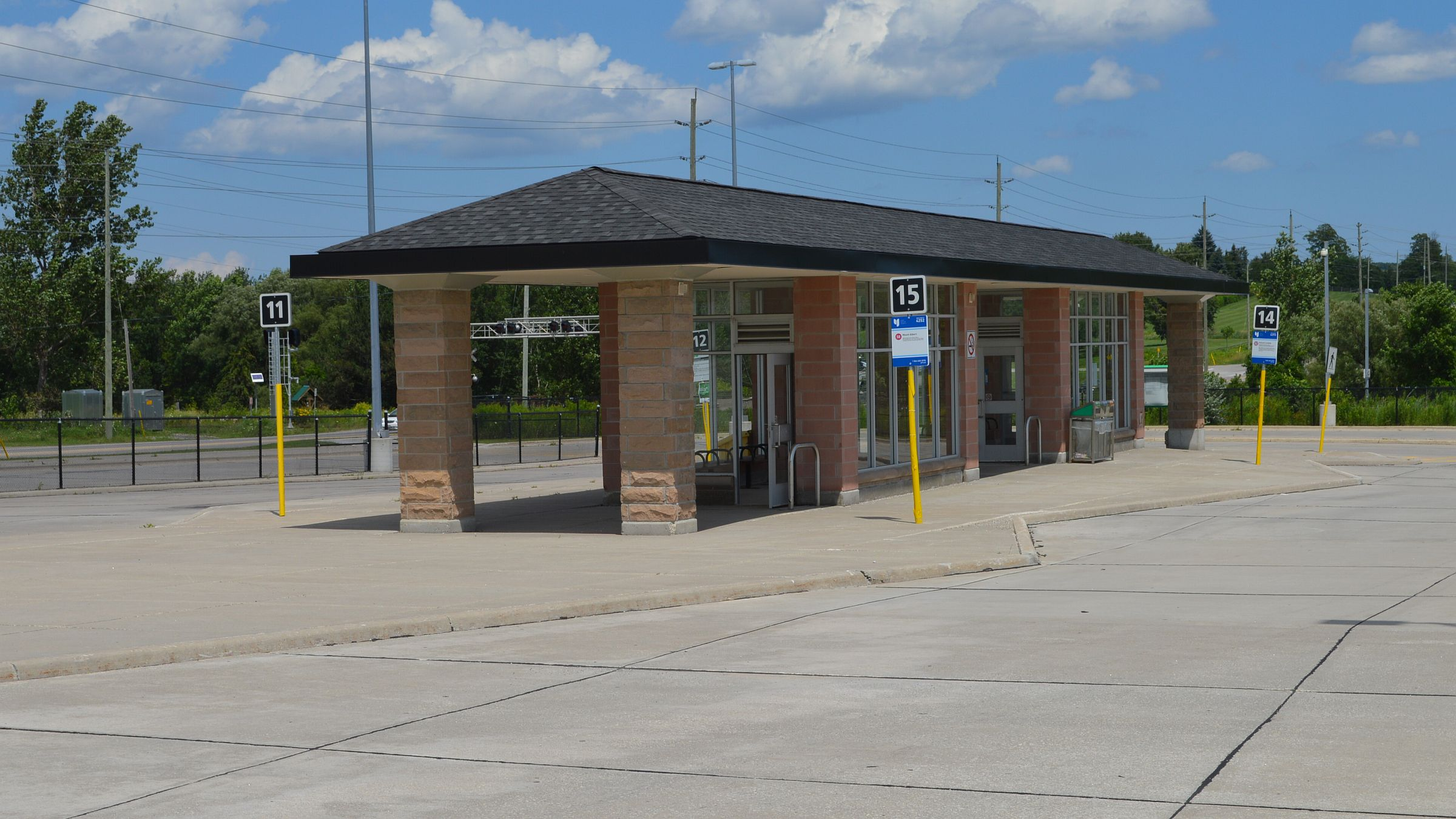
The GO/YRT bus terminal

The station has a bus terminal located on the north side where GO Bus service supplements trains during the time when no trains are scheduled. York Region Transit (YRT) routes extend here from their regular termini during rush hours to connect with GO Trains.

=== Platform assignments ===
- Platform 1: GO Transit extra
- Platform 2: GO Transit extra
- Platform 4: GO 68B, 68 northbound to Barrie Allandale Transit Terminal
- Platform 8: GO 66, 66A Southbound to Yorkdale Bus Terminal
- Platform 9: GO 65B southbound to Union Station Bus Terminal via Newmarket GO Station
- Platform 9: GO 65 southbound to Union Station Bus Terminal via Aurora GO Station
- Platform 9: GO 68 southbound to Aurora GO Station
- Platform 11: Unassigned
- Platform 12: YRT Mobility On-Request
- Platform 14: Unassigned
- Platform 15: YRT 54 Bayview
