= Newmarket, Ontario =

Town in Ontario, Canada

Newmarket
- Town (lower-tier)
- Town of Newmarket
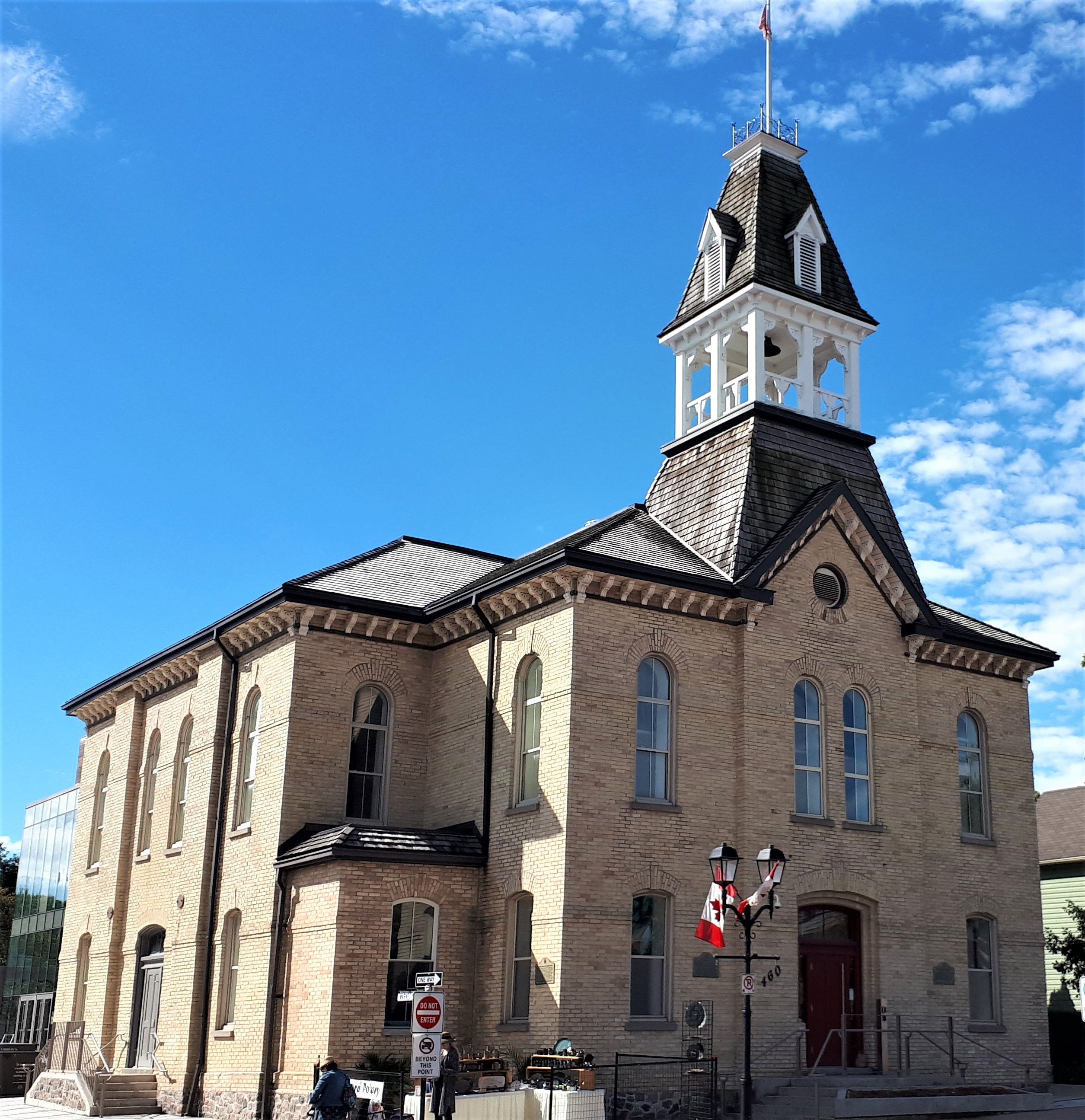
- Newmarket's Old Town Hall
- Motto: "Prudence"
- Location of Newmarket within York Region

- Location of Newmarket within Southern Ontario
- Coordinates: 44°03′29″N 79°27′30″W
- Country: Canada
- Province: Ontario
- Region: York
- Settled: 1801
- Incorporated: 1857 (village)
- Incorporated: 1880 (town)

Government
  - Type: Seat of York Region
  - Mayor: John Taylor
  - Regional Councillor: Tom Vegh
  - MP: Sandra Cobena (Conservative)
  - MPP: Dawn Gallagher Murphy (Progressive Conservative)

Area
  - Total: 38.50 km^{2} (14.86 sq mi)
- Elevation: 239 m (784 ft)

Population (2021)
  - Total: 87,942 (70th)
  - Density: 2,284.1/km^{2} (5,916/sq mi)
- Time zone: UTC−5 (EST)
  - Summer (DST): UTC−4 (EDT)
- Forward Sortation Area: L3X to L3Y
- Area codes: 905, 289, 365, and 742
- Website: newmarket.ca

Newmarket (2021 population: 87,942) is a town and regional seat of York Region, Ontario, Canada. It is part of the Greater Toronto Area in the Golden Horseshoe region of Southern Ontario. The name stems from the fact that the settlement was a "New Market", in contrast to York as the Old Market.

The town was formed as one of many farming communities in the area, but also developed an industrial centre on the Northern Railway of Canada's mainline, which was built in 1853 through what would become the downtown area. It also became a thriving market town with the arrival of the Metropolitan Street Railway in 1899. Over time, the town developed into a primarily residential area, and the expansion of Highway 400 to the west and the construction of Highway 404 to the east increasingly turned it into a bedroom town since the 1980s. The province's Official Plan includes growth in the business services and knowledge industries, as well as in the administrative, manufacturing and retail sectors.

Landmarks include Upper Canada Mall, Southlake Regional Health Centre, the Main Street Heritage Conservation District, and Wesley Brooks Conservation Area (locally called "Fairy Lake Park" or "Fairy Lake").

== History ==
Newmarket's location on the Holland River enabled travel between Lake Ontario and Lake Simcoe. A portage route, the Toronto Carrying-Place Trail, ran one of its two routes up the Holland River through the Newmarket area, and over the Oak Ridges Moraine to the Rouge River and into Lake Ontario. A more widely used route ran up the western branch of the Holland River, over the moraine, and down the Humber River. In 1793, John Graves Simcoe travelled the trail northward along the main route to the west, and south to York (now Toronto) along the lesser used eastern route through Newmarket. Selecting the eastern route as the better of the two, Simcoe started construction of Yonge Street along the former trail in late 1795, starting in York in Toronto Bay, and ending at the newly named St. Albans (Holland Landing), north of Newmarket.

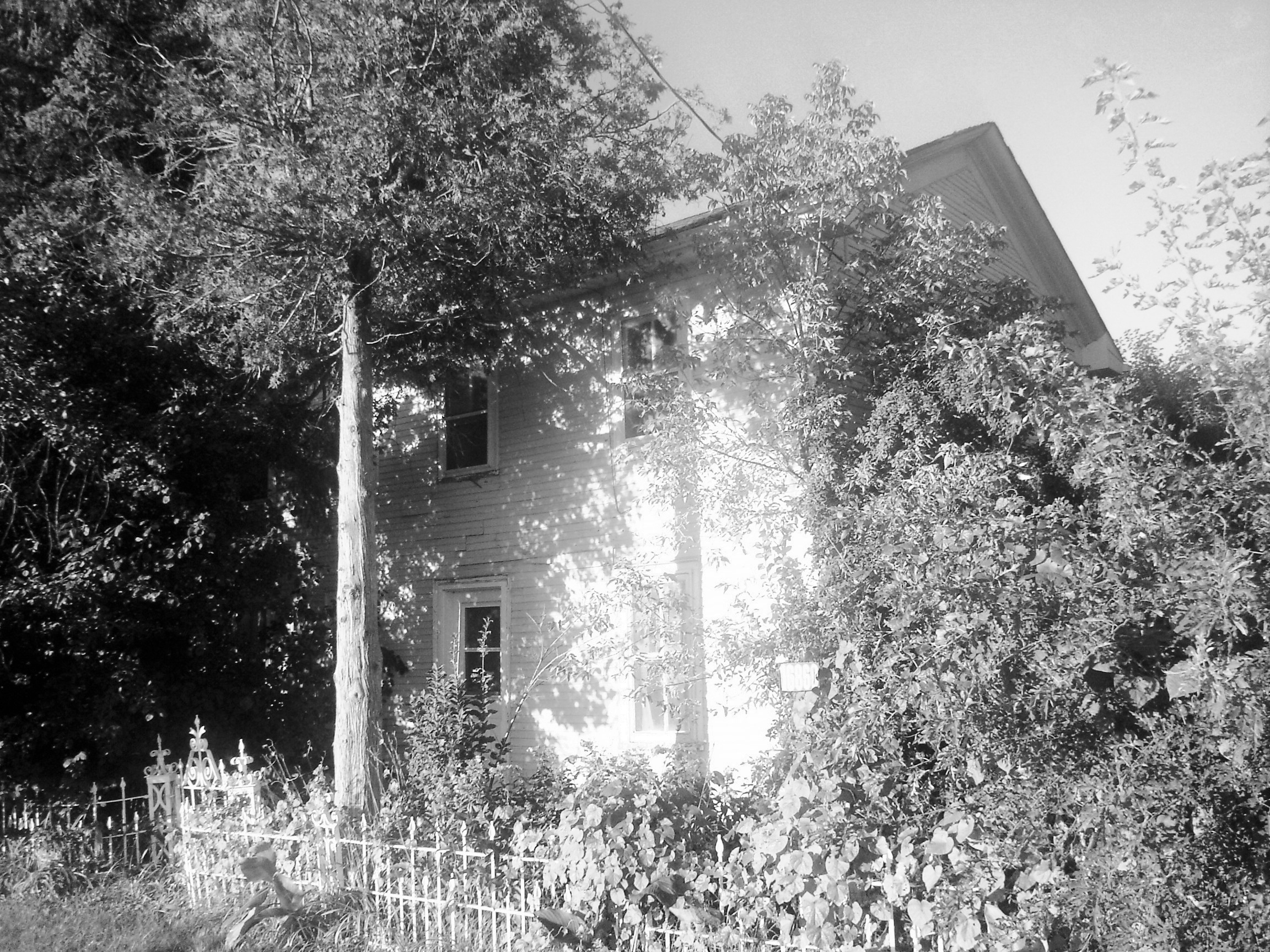
The John Bogart House on Leslie Street is the oldest residential structure in Newmarket and the oldest two-storey residential building north of Toronto. It was built in 1811 and still serves as a house.

=== Early settlement ===
Quakers from the Thirteen Colonies moved to the area to avoid violence they were expected to take part in during the American Revolution. In June 1800, Timothy Rogers, a Quaker from Vermont, explored the area around the Holland River to find a suitable location for a new Quaker settlement. He, Samuel Lundy and their group of Religious Society of Friends received the grant of 8,000 acres (3,200 ha) around the Holland River. In 1801, Rogers returned along with several Quaker families who had left their homes in Vermont and Pennsylvania, and settled here between 1801 and 1803.

Joseph Hill constructed a mill on the river, damming it to produce a mill pond today known as Fairy Lake. The settlement of "Upper Yonge Street" developed around the mill and the Holland River. Hill also built a tannery north of the mill, the first general store and house, and additional mills.

In 1802, Elisha Beman, who owned land in the area, established a mill, and then a distillery. Mordecai Millar also built mills, and Joseph Hill opened a tannery. During the War of 1812 a resident, William Roe, hid the settlement's gold treasury from invading American troops. The war helped the settlement prosper, as the British army purchased goods and food and hired locals to build structures.

By 1814, the settlement had two frame and several log buildings used as residences. The settlement continued to grow through the early 19th century, along with the formation of Aurora and Holland Landing. A post office opened in 1826, and until 1890 the name was spelled "New Market".

Newmarket is noted for its role in the Rebellions of 1837–1838, and was a centre of discontent against the manipulations of the governing Family Compact. Rebel leader William Lyon Mackenzie organized a series of meetings leading to the Rebellion; the first of which, on August 3, 1837, was delivered from the veranda of the North American Hotel in Newmarket. This speech contributed to the rebellion, as it was heard by about 600 farmers and others sympathetic to Mackenzie's cause, who later that year armed themselves and marched down Yonge Street to take the capital. A number of leaders from this area were attainted for high treason, convicted and hanged.

By 1846, the population was about 600. Much of the settlement was built on the south side of the town, with farms surrounding it. There were six churches or chapels, a post office, five stores, three taverns, and tradesmen of various types. Industry included two grist-mills, two breweries, a distillery, one tannery, a foundry, a carding machine, and a cloth factory.

In June 1853, the first train pulled into Newmarket on the Toronto, Simcoe & Lake Huron Union Railroad, the first railway in Upper Canada. It was later called the Northern Railway of Canada, and carried passengers, agricultural products and manufactured goods. The line eventually linked Toronto to Collingwood on Georgian Bay, a major shipbuilding centre. Today, this line is the "Newmarket Subdivision" of the Canadian National Railway system, running north out of Newmarket towards Bradford, and south towards Toronto.

=== From village to town ===
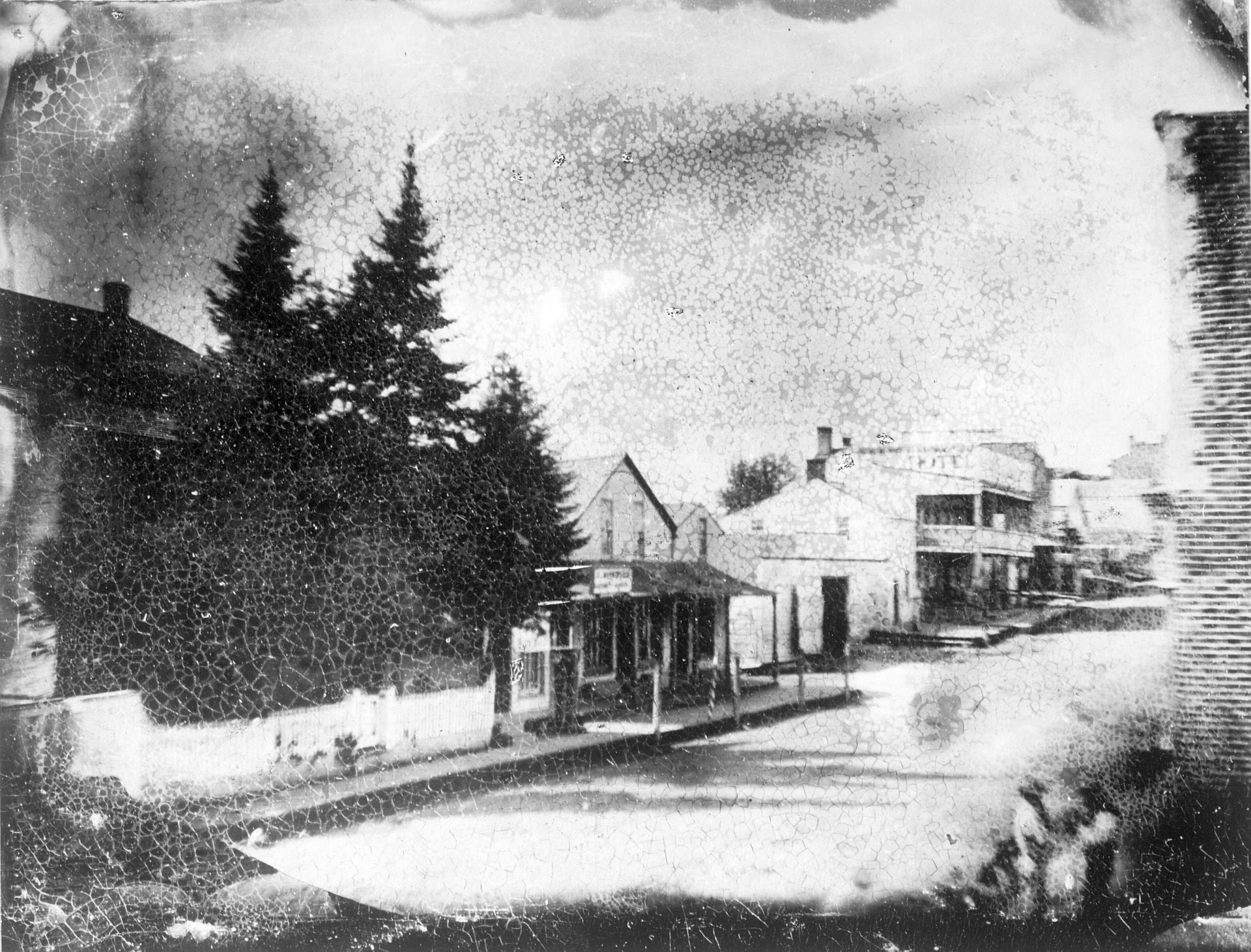
Main Street in 1856

Newmarket was incorporated as a village in 1857 with a population of 700, with Donald Sutherland as the first reeve. In 1858, Robert Simpson co-opened "Simpson & Trent Groceries, Boots, Shoes and Dry Goods" in downtown Newmarket, the first store in what would become the Simpsons department store chain. In 1880, Newmarket became a town with a population of 2,000. William Cane was elected as the first mayor. Some years later, his sash and door factory would become the first Canadian manufacturer of lead pencils, the Dixon Pencil Company.

In 1869, the population was 1,500 and a gazetteer described Newmarket as one of the most flourishing villages on the Northern Railway line. In addition to the train, stagecoaches were available to nearby communities. By the time of the 1871 census, the population was 1,760 and by 1881, it had increased to 2,006; an elementary school and a high school were already in operation by then.

The Toronto and York Radial Railway arrived in Newmarket in 1899. This service operated along Yonge Street south of Newmarket, but turned east to run through the downtown area along Main Street; it would later be extended north to Sutton. At the time, it brought significant numbers of day-trippers to Newmarket to shop at the market. Automobile traffic on Yonge Street, and the already existing mainline railway, had a significant effect on ridership, and the Radial was discontinued in the early 1930s.

North of Davis Drive in Newmarket, the East Holland River was straightened to prepare it for use as a commercial waterway to bypass the railway, whose prices were skyrocketing around the turn of the 20th century. Sir William Mulock, the local Member of Parliament, proposed a canal system running down the Holland River through Holland Landing and into Lake Simcoe. This would allow boats to connect from there to the Trent–Severn Waterway for eventual shipment south. The Newmarket Canal was almost complete by the summer of 1912, when it was cancelled by the incoming government of Robert Borden. Today, the locks are still visible and are known as the "Ghost Canal". The turning basin in downtown Newmarket was filled in and now forms the parking lot of The Old Davis Tannery Mall, on the site of the former Hill tannery.

=== Recent developments ===
For much of the 20th century, Newmarket developed along the east-west Davis Drive axis, limited to the area between Yonge Street on the west and between Bayview and Leslie Street in the east, and running from just north of Davis on the north to the Fairy Lake area on the south. By the 1950s, Newmarket was experiencing a suburban building boom due to its proximity to Toronto. The population increased from 5,000 to 11,000 between 1950 and 1970.

The Regional Municipality of York was formed in 1971, increasing the size of Newmarket with land from the Township of East Gwillimbury, from the Township of King and from the Township of Whitchurch. The construction of Upper Canada Mall at the corner of Yonge Street and Davis Drive in 1974 started pulling the focal point of the town westward from the historic Downtown area along Main Street.

By the early 1980s, the historic Downtown area suffered as most businesses had built up in the area around Upper Canada Mall, with additional strip malls developing directly across the Yonge Street/Davis Drive intersection to the south and southeast. A concerted effort to revitalize the historic Downtown area during the late 1980s was successful. More recently, a $2.3-million investment was made by the town in 2004 in streetscaping and infrastructure improvements to roads and sidewalks in the historic Downtown. The historic area of Downtown's Main Street is once again a major focal point of the town.

The arrival of Highway 404 reversed the westward movement, pulling development eastward again, and surrounding the formerly separate hamlet of Bogarttown at the intersection of Mulock Drive and Leslie Street. Since then, Newmarket has grown considerably, filling out in all directions. The town limits now run from Bathurst Street in the west to Highway 404 in the east, and from just south of Green Lane to just north of St. John's Sideroad, taking over the former hamlet of Armitage at Yonge Street south of Mulock Drive. The southern boundary of the town is contiguous with Aurora to the south.

Armitage was the first settlement of King township, named in honour of its first settler Amos Armitage. He had been recruited by Timothy Rogers, a Loyalist from Vermont, who in 1801 had travelled along Yonge Street and found the area appealing, and so applied for and received a grant for land totalling 40 farms, each of 200 acres (0.8 km^{2}).

Other defunct communities once located within the modern boundaries of Newmarket include Garbut's Hill, Paddytown, Petchville, Pleasantville, and White Rose.

== Geography ==
The main river in Newmarket is the East Holland River (known locally simply as "The Holland River"), and all other streams in the town are tributaries thereto. These include Bogart Creek, a brook that weaves its way into the town from the Oak Ridges Moraine by way of Bogarttown, emptying into the Holland River in north-central Newmarket; Western creek, another brook rising just west of the town, and reaching the Holland River in the town's north end; Tannery Creek, a stream that joins the Holland River in south Newmarket after flowing through Aurora; and a number of other small watercourses.

There are two reservoirs in Newmarket; Fairy Lake (which is managed by the Lake Simcoe Region Conservation Authority), a favourite recreational area in the centre of town, is a former mill pond on the East Holland River; and Bogart Pond, also a former mill pond, is fed and drained by Bogart Creek in Bogarttown. Furthermore, the water level in the reach of the East Holland north of Davis Drive is controlled from an unfinished Newmarket Canal lock, now used as a weir.

Newmarket also lies south of and above the Algonquin Shoreline, where elevations suddenly drop off from the gently rolling hills that characterize much of Newmarket to the much flatter, lower land down below in the Holland Marsh.

The land is characterized mainly by glacial deposits from the last ice age, known as "Newmarket Till". The town is underlain mainly by sand and gravel, ground by the icesheets that covered the area until about 10,000 years ago. No outcrops are to be found anywhere in Newmarket, so deep are the glacial deposits.

=== Planning ===
Newmarket is identified as one of the Golden Horseshoe's 25 Urban Growth Centres in Ontario's Places to Grow Growth Plan.

Four areas of Newmarket have been selected to absorb the majority of planned population growth and accommodate mixed usages on sites well served by transit. These are the Yonge-Davis intersection, Yonge Street (south of Green Lane), the Regional Healthcare Centre (Southlake Regional Health Centre) and Historic Downtown Centre (surrounding Main Street South). Further construction of big box retail stores in the Yonge Street corridor will not be permitted and the long-term objective of the town is redevelopment or the addition of new buildings to these areas through controlled intensification.

The southwest portion of the town is located in the Oak Ridges Moraine and is therefore subject to the Ontario Government's Greenbelt Legislation.

=== Climate ===
Newmarket has a humid continental climate (Köppen climate classification Dfb), with four distinct seasons featuring cold, somewhat snowy winters and warm, humid summers. Precipitation is moderate and consistent in all seasons, although summers are a bit wetter than winter due to the moisture from the Gulf of Mexico and the Great Lakes.

Climate data for Newmarket/King Smoke Tree (1981–2010 normals, extremes 1908–present)
Month	Jan	Feb	Mar	Apr	May	Jun	Jul	Aug	Sep	Oct	Nov	Dec	Year
Record high °C (°F)	14.9 (58.8)	17.3 (63.1)	26.3 (79.3)	31.7 (89.1)	34.6 (94.3)	36.6 (97.9)	40.0 (104.0)	37.8 (100.0)	35.6 (96.1)	30.9 (87.6)	23.8 (74.8)	19.0 (66.2)	40.0 (104.0)
Mean daily maximum °C (°F)	−3.6 (25.5)	−2.2 (28.0)	2.7 (36.9)	10.8 (51.4)	17.7 (63.9)	22.9 (73.2)	25.7 (78.3)	24.5 (76.1)	20.0 (68.0)	12.8 (55.0)	5.6 (42.1)	−0.4 (31.3)	11.4 (52.5)
Daily mean °C (°F)	−7.4 (18.7)	−6.1 (21.0)	−1.5 (29.3)	6.0 (42.8)	12.5 (54.5)	17.7 (63.9)	20.5 (68.9)	19.6 (67.3)	15.3 (59.5)	8.6 (47.5)	2.2 (36.0)	−3.7 (25.3)	7.0 (44.6)
Mean daily minimum °C (°F)	−11.1 (12.0)	−10.0 (14.0)	−5.8 (21.6)	1.1 (34.0)	7.2 (45.0)	12.4 (54.3)	15.2 (59.4)	14.6 (58.3)	10.6 (51.1)	4.4 (39.9)	−1.2 (29.8)	−7.0 (19.4)	2.5 (36.5)
Record low °C (°F)	−35.2 (−31.4)	−34.4 (−29.9)	−25.6 (−14.1)	−20.0 (−4.0)	−5.0 (23.0)	−4.4 (24.1)	2.2 (36.0)	1.1 (34.0)	−3.3 (26.1)	−9.4 (15.1)	−20.6 (−5.1)	−33.9 (−29.0)	−35.2 (−31.4)
Average precipitation mm (inches)	51.7 (2.04)	46.0 (1.81)	51.2 (2.02)	64.9 (2.56)	87.1 (3.43)	84.8 (3.34)	86.4 (3.40)	88.4 (3.48)	84.2 (3.31)	72.9 (2.87)	84.6 (3.33)	55.5 (2.19)	857.6 (33.76)
Average rainfall mm (inches)	20.7 (0.81)	23.1 (0.91)	30.2 (1.19)	59.5 (2.34)	87.1 (3.43)	84.8 (3.34)	86.4 (3.40)	88.4 (3.48)	84.2 (3.31)	71.5 (2.81)	71.0 (2.80)	28.5 (1.12)	735.3 (28.95)
Average snowfall cm (inches)	31.0 (12.2)	22.9 (9.0)	21.0 (8.3)	5.4 (2.1)	0.0 (0.0)	0.0 (0.0)	0.0 (0.0)	0.0 (0.0)	0.0 (0.0)	1.4 (0.6)	13.6 (5.4)	27.0 (10.6)	122.2 (48.1)
Average precipitation days (≥ 0.2 mm)	11.7	8.9	9.9	11.4	11.4	10.6	9.5	10.9	11.3	12.0	12.4	9.7	129.5
Average rainy days (≥ 0.2 mm)	3.3	3.2	5.6	10.0	11.4	10.6	9.5	10.9	11.3	11.8	9.6	4.6	101.8
Average snowy days (≥ 0.2 cm)	8.8	6.2	5.2	1.7	0.0	0.0	0.0	0.0	0.0	0.48	3.7	5.6	31.7
Source: Environment Canada

== Demographics ==
Historical populations
Year	Pop.	±%
1841	600	—
1871	1,760	+193.3%
1881	2,006	+14.0%
1891	2,143	+6.8%
1901	2,125	−0.8%
1911	2,966	+39.6%
1921	3,626	+22.3%
1931	3,748	+3.4%
1941	4,026	+7.4%
1951	5,356	+33.0%
1961	8,932	+66.8%
1971	18,941	+112.1%
1981	29,753	+57.1%
1991	45,474	+52.8%
1996	57,125	+25.6%
2001	65,788	+15.2%
2006	74,295	+12.9%
2011	79,978	+7.6%
2016	84,224	+5.3%
2021	87,942	+4.4%

In the 2021 Census of Population conducted by Statistics Canada, Newmarket had a population of 87,942 living in 30,301 of its 31,239 total private dwellings, a change of 4.4% from its 2016 population of 84,224. With a land area of 38.5 km^{2} (14.9 sq mi), it had a population density of 2,284.2/km^{2} (5,916.1/sq mi) in 2021.

In 2015, the median household income in Newmarket was $95,589, exceeding the provincial average for the same year of $75,287.

According to the 2016 census, the town's population was 87,942. The York Region Planning Department projects a population of 98,000 by 2026. Newmarket's population density is just over 2000 inhabitants per square kilometre, ranking the census subdivision third in Ontario and 33rd in Canada.Of the 2,290 immigrants who settled in Newmarket between 2011 and 2016, 505 (22 per cent) emigrated from China, 290 (13 per cent) from Iran, and 240 (10 per cent) from the Philippines.

=== Ethnicity ===
The top five ethnic origins of the population are English, Canadian, Scottish, Irish and Italian. In 2021, Newmarket was 63.9% white/European, 34.9% visible minorities, and 1.2% Indigenous. The largest visible minority groups (population of over 1,000) were Chinese (10.0%), West Asian (6.5%), South Asian (4.3%), Black (2.9%), Southeast Asian (2.5%), Filipino (2.4%), and Latin American (1.5%).

Panethnic groups in the Town of Newmarket (2001−2021)
Panethnic group	2021		2016		2011		2006		2001	
Panethnic group	Pop.	%	Pop.	%	Pop.	%	Pop.	%	Pop.	%
European (Note: Statistic includes all persons that did not make up part of a visible minority or an indigenous identity.)	55,365	63.92%	60,095	72.64%	62,965	79.78%	61,670	84.05%	57,445	88.28%
East Asian (Note: Statistic includes total responses of "Chinese", "Korean", and "Japanese" under visible minority section on census.)	9,845	11.37%	6,580	7.95%	3,335	4.23%	2,735	3.73%	2,025	3.11%
Middle Eastern (Note: Statistic includes total responses of "West Asian" and "Arab" under visible minority section on census.)	6,605	7.63%	2,640	3.19%	1,170	1.48%	715	0.97%	325	0.5%
Southeast Asian (Note: Statistic includes total responses of "Filipino" and "Southeast Asian" under visible minority section on census.)	4,240	4.9%	4,065	4.91%	3,950	5.01%	3,035	4.14%	1,560	2.4%
South Asian	3,765	4.35%	3,295	3.98%	2,930	3.71%	1,955	2.66%	1,225	1.88%
African	2,485	2.87%	2,310	2.79%	1,945	2.46%	1,385	1.89%	1,170	1.8%
Latin American	1,300	1.5%	1,225	1.48%	830	1.05%	565	0.77%	365	0.56%
Indigenous	1,015	1.17%	1,290	1.56%	820	1.04%	585	0.8%	395	0.61%
Other/multiracial (Note: Statistic includes total responses of "Visible minority, n.i.e." and "Multiple visible minorities" under visible minority section on census.)	2,000	2.31%	1,235	1.49%	975	1.24%	730	0.99%	575	0.88%
Total responses	86,610	98.49%	82,730	98.23%	78,920	98.68%	73,370	98.75%	65,070	98.91%
Total population	87,942	100%	84,224	100%	79,978	100%	74,295	100%	65,788	100%
Note: Totals greater than 100% due to multiple origin responses

=== Language ===
English was the mother tongue of 64.2% of Newmarket residents in 2021. The next most common first languages were Chinese languages (7.5% including 4.7% Mandarin and 2.6% Cantonese), Persian (5.7%), Russian (2.7%), Italian (1.4%), Spanish (1.4%) Tagalog (1.1%), and French (1.0%). 3.2% of residents listed both English and a non-official language as mother tongues, while 0.4% listed both English and French.

=== Religion ===
50.6% of residents were Christian, down from 66.5% in 2011. 23.9% were Catholic, 12.2% were Protestant, 7.6% were Christian (non-denominational), 4.2% were Christian Orthodox, and 2.7% belonged to other Christian denominations and Christian-related traditions. Non-religious or secular residents were 36.5% of the population, up from 25.4% in 2011. 12.9% of the population belonged to other religions and spiritual tradition, up from 8.1% in 2011. The largest non-Christian religions were Islam (6.5%), Buddhism (2.2%), Judaism (2.0%) and Hinduism (1.3%).

== Economy ==
Newmarket features a diverse and growing economy based largely in the business services, healthcare and knowledge sectors, as well as manufacturing and retail industries.

The following are some of the town's major public sector employers:

- Southlake Regional Health Centre
- Regional Municipality of York
- Town of Newmarket
- York Regional Police
- Royal Canadian Mounted Police "O" Division, Toronto North Headquarters
- Ontario Court of Justice / Ontario Superior Court of Justice
- York Region District School Board
- York Catholic District School Board
- Lake Simcoe Region Conservation Authority

The following are some of the town's major private sector employers:

- Celestica Inc.
- RNS Health Care Services
- TS Tech Canada Inc.
- Bill Gosling Outsourcing
- Mars Canada Inc. (formerly known as Effem Inc.)
- Rockets Candy Company
- Exco Technologies
- Magna International
- Cintas
- BYD Company (bus plant closed ~2023)

As a result of this strong employment base both in Newmarket and York Region, 50% of Newmarket residents commute less than 30 minutes to work each day.

== Arts and culture ==
=== Main Street Heritage Conservation District ===
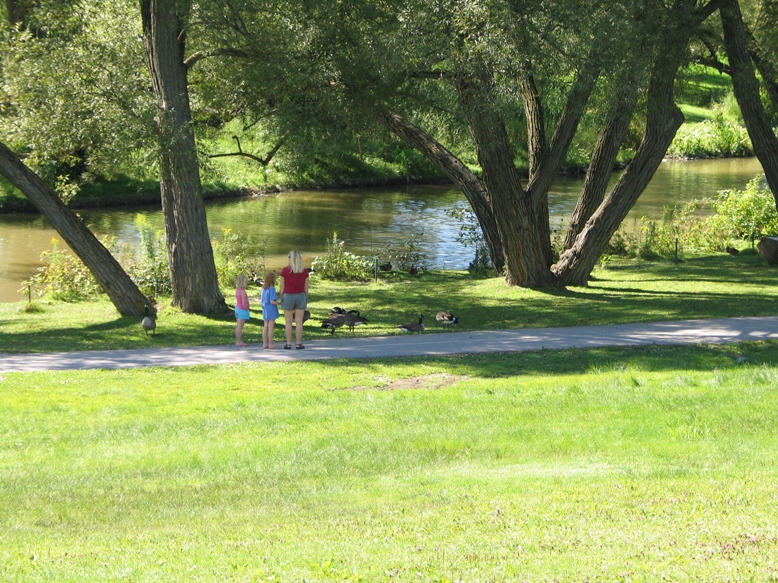
Wesley Brooks Conservation Area

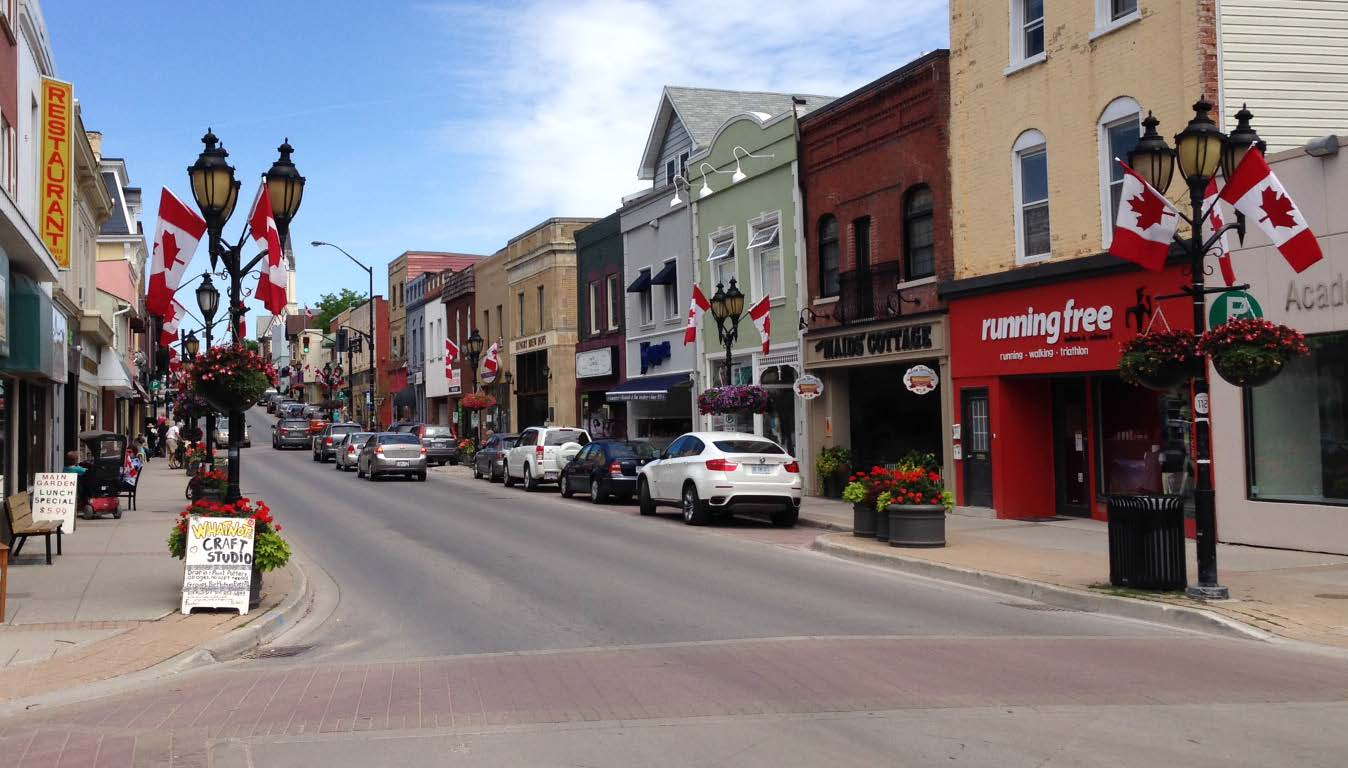
Historic Main Street in Newmarket

For over 100 years, the town's downtown area, centred around Main Street, has acted as a hub of commerce and cultural activity. This area contains numerous early 19th century buildings worthy of preservation, and in October 2013, this area was recognized as a Provincial Heritage Conservation District. This status serves to protect and officially recognize many of the heritage sites and buildings along this historic thoroughfare and its many side streets.

Recent investments have been made to improve the aesthetics and function of the historic area. These include:

- In 2003, Newmarket completed approximately $3 million of streetscape and infrastructure improvements along Main Street South.
- In 2010, construction began on the Davis Drive Rapidway. The project was finished in 2015. The buildings comprising the Union Hotel, dating from 1881, at the intersection of Main Street and Davis Drive were moved as an alternative to being demolished.
- In 2011, an urban park called "Riverwalk Commons" was created east of Main Street South, north of Water Street at a cost of $10 million.
- In 2011, extensive renovations were completed to the Newmarket Community Centre & Lions Hall, located in the Riverwalk Commons.
- In 2016, extensive $10 million renovations were completed on Old Town Hall, off Main Street.

=== Architecture and heritage ===
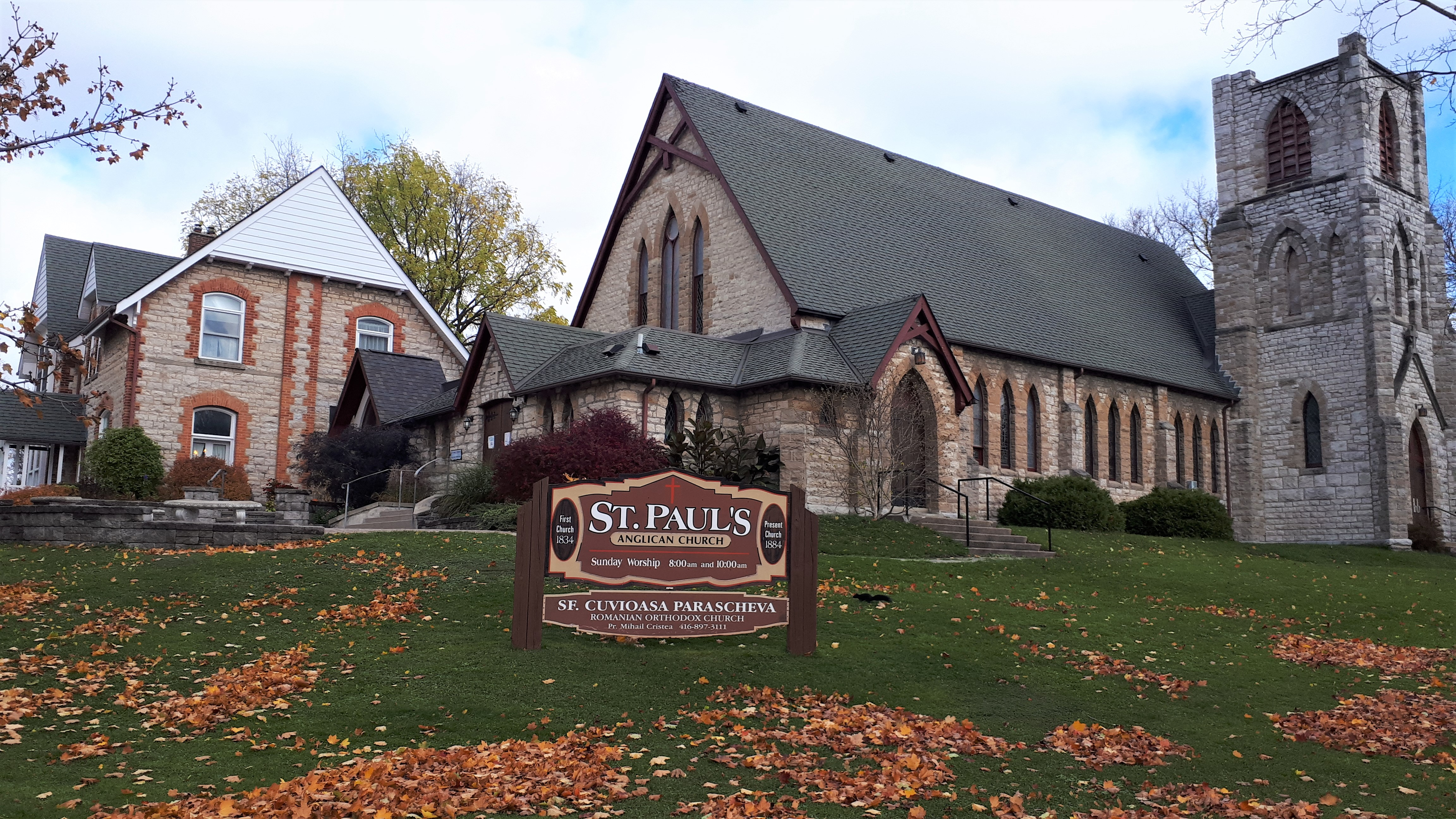
Saint Paul's Anglican Church and Rectory

Numerous buildings and sites located in Newmarket possess a high degree of architectural and/or historical significance; most of these are concentrated in the historic Main Street area. The following is a list of some of these sites; many of the below-listed buildings located along Main Street are within the Main Street Heritage Conservation District:

- Charles Hargrave Simpson Building, 184 Main Street South
- Wesley Block (origin of the 1837 Rebellion), 200 Main Street South
- Robert Simpson Store (first Simpson's Store in Canada), 226 Main Street South
- King George Hotel, 232 Main Street South
- Cawthra House, 262 Main Street South
- Roadhouse And Rose building, 157 Main Street South
- Charles E. Boyd Building, 240 Main Street South
- William N. Starr building, 189 Main Street South
- Old Newmarket Town Hall and Courthouse, 460 Botsford Street
- Canadian National Railway Building and former Station, 470 Davis Drive
- Christian Baptist Church, 135 Main Street South
- Doane House, 17100 Yonge Street
- Quaker Meeting House and Cemetery, 17030 Yonge Street
- Hicksite Cemetery, 16580 Yonge Street
- Elman W. Campbell Museum (formerly the North York Registry Office), 134 Main Street South
- Pioneer Burying Ground, Eagle Street
- Al Casale Ristorante (Rogers House), 17766 Leslie Street
- St. Andrew's Presbyterian Church, 484 Water Street
- St. Paul's Anglican Church and Rectory, 227 Church Street
- Trinity United Church, 461 Park Avenue
- Union Hotel, 425 Davis Drive - The two buildings comprising the Union Hotel were relocated to the back of the former site due to construction of the Davis Drive Rapidway In 2018, the buildings were designated under the Ontario Heritage Act.

=== Theatre ===
- The NewRoads Performing Arts Centre (formerly the Newmarket Theatre) is the largest performing arts theatre in the town, with a capacity of 400. It hosts a selection of world-class artists and local performing arts events annually. The NewRoads Performing Arts Centre is operated by the Town of Newmarket.
- Old Town Hall has hosted organized theatre and performing arts for over 100 years, and in March 2012 the Town of Newmarket announced that a formal 250-seat theatre would be included as part of its revitalization. Construction on this initiative started in 2013 and was completed in 2016.

=== Coat of arms ===
Newmarket's coat of arms

Newmarket's coat of arms is actually taken from the town's old corporate seal. The town flag is a navy blue field with this same design in the middle. The beehive and bees are said to represent industry. There are nine bees, representing the town's nine most prominent businesses at the time that Newmarket was incorporated as a Village. The latest form of the seal was introduced in 1938 with the arms somewhat altered from – but very similar in concept to – one that was earlier used. The arms' origin is something of a mystery, however. It is unknown what artist created the current version – or indeed the earlier version – and the town has no official record as to the purchase or redesign of the arms.

== Sports ==
=== Hockey ===
Newmarket was previously home to the following teams:

- Newmarket Hurricanes from 1987 to 2019, an Ontario Provincial Junior A Hockey League. The franchise was moved to Milton, Ontario and renamed to the Milton Menace. In 2025, the Toronto Jr. Canadiens OJHL team moved to Newmarket under the Newmarket Hurricanes name.
- Newmarket Saints from 1986 to 1991, an American Hockey League franchise and farm team of the Toronto Maple Leafs who moved from St. Catharines. The franchise was later moved to St. John's, Newfoundland and became the St. John's Maple Leafs.
- Newmarket Royals from 1992 to 1994. This was a franchise of the Ontario Hockey League who were previously the Cornwall Royals and in 1994 moved again to become the Sarnia Sting.
- Newmarket Flyers from 1975 to 1986, OPJHL Jr. A (formerly The Seneca Flyers).
- Newmarket Redmen from late 1920s to 1972 Jr. B.

Junior Leagues Newmarket is also home to many rep and select teams. They go by the name of the Newmarket Renegades and range from divisions of Tyke to Midget.

=== Golf ===
One golf course is located within Newmarket's town limits; St. Andrew's Valley (a public club), which straddles the Aurora/Newmarket border. Glenway Country Club was a private club with a course within Newmarket's boundaries, but it was closed before the 2012 season and has since been redeveloped for housing.

There are also several courses in the surrounding communities and countryside.

=== Swimming ===
Three public swimming places exist throughout Newmarket: Ray Twinney Complex, Gorman Pool, which is open only in the summer, and the Magna Centre.

=== Curling ===
Newmarket is home to the York Curling Club.

== Government ==
=== Mayor and Council ===
John Taylor was elected in October 2018 to become mayor, succeeding Tony Van Bynen who was mayor from 2006 to 2018. (See list of previous mayors)

The town's council includes a mayor, seven councillors elected on the basis of one per ward, and a regional councillor who is elected to join the mayor at meetings of York Regional Council. The members of council elected in 2018 are:

Mayor: John Taylor

Deputy Mayor & Regional Councillor: Tom Vegh

Councillors:

- Ward 1: Grace Simon
- Ward 2: Victor Woodhouse
- Ward 3: Jane Twinney
- Ward 4: Trevor Morrison
- Ward 5: Bob Kwapis
- Ward 6: Kelly Broome
- Ward 7: Christina Bisanz

Provincially, Newmarket is part of the riding of Newmarket—Aurora represented by Dawn Gallagher Murphy, a member of the PC Party of Ontario, and elected in 2022 general election. The province realigned its ridings to match those of the federal government since 2004 but not in 2025.

Federally, Newmarket is part of the riding of federal riding of Newmarket—Aurora. The riding is represented in the House of Commons of Canada by Sandra Cobena, a member of the Conservative Party of Canada, who was first elected in 2025 general election.

=== Town Offices ===
The town offices are located at 395 Mulock Drive, which is the fifth location for the offices. Purchased as an abandoned factory in 1995, it was opened in 1996. The location was found after years of unsuccessful attempts to purchase the Tannery Mall (465 Davis Drive) or Office Specialty Factory (near 543 Timothy Street c.1912 and now mostly demolished).

Prior to 1996, the town offices were located a various locations:

- King George Hotel - 234 Main Street South (corner of Timothy and Main Streets) and was built in 1825 Now commercial building.
- Town Hall and Registry Offices - 140 Main Street South at northwest corner of Main Street South and Millard Street 1863–1942. Council met above fire hall. Town Clerk office and Fire Hall were demolished and now home to Old Flame Brewing Company. Registry Building next door is now a museum.
- Widdfield Building - Main Street South and Botsford Streets was formerly an Imperial Bank of Canada branch. Used from 1942 to 1952 (or 1959?) and now home to cafe.
- 171 Main Street South - moved here in 1981 and remained until 1996. Building was acquired in 1950. Now 171 Main Street South Professional Building.

=== Police ===
The York Regional Police is the primary police agency in Newmarket. Ontario Provincial Police patrol on provincially maintained highways in Newmarket like Highway 404.

The Royal Canadian Mounted Police North Toronto Detachment is located in Newmarket.

== Infrastructure ==
=== Transportation ===
Newmarket is connected to Toronto by highways. It is served by two interchanges (Davis Drive, as well as Vivian Road / Mulock Drive) along Highway 404 and connected to Highway 400 via Highway 9.

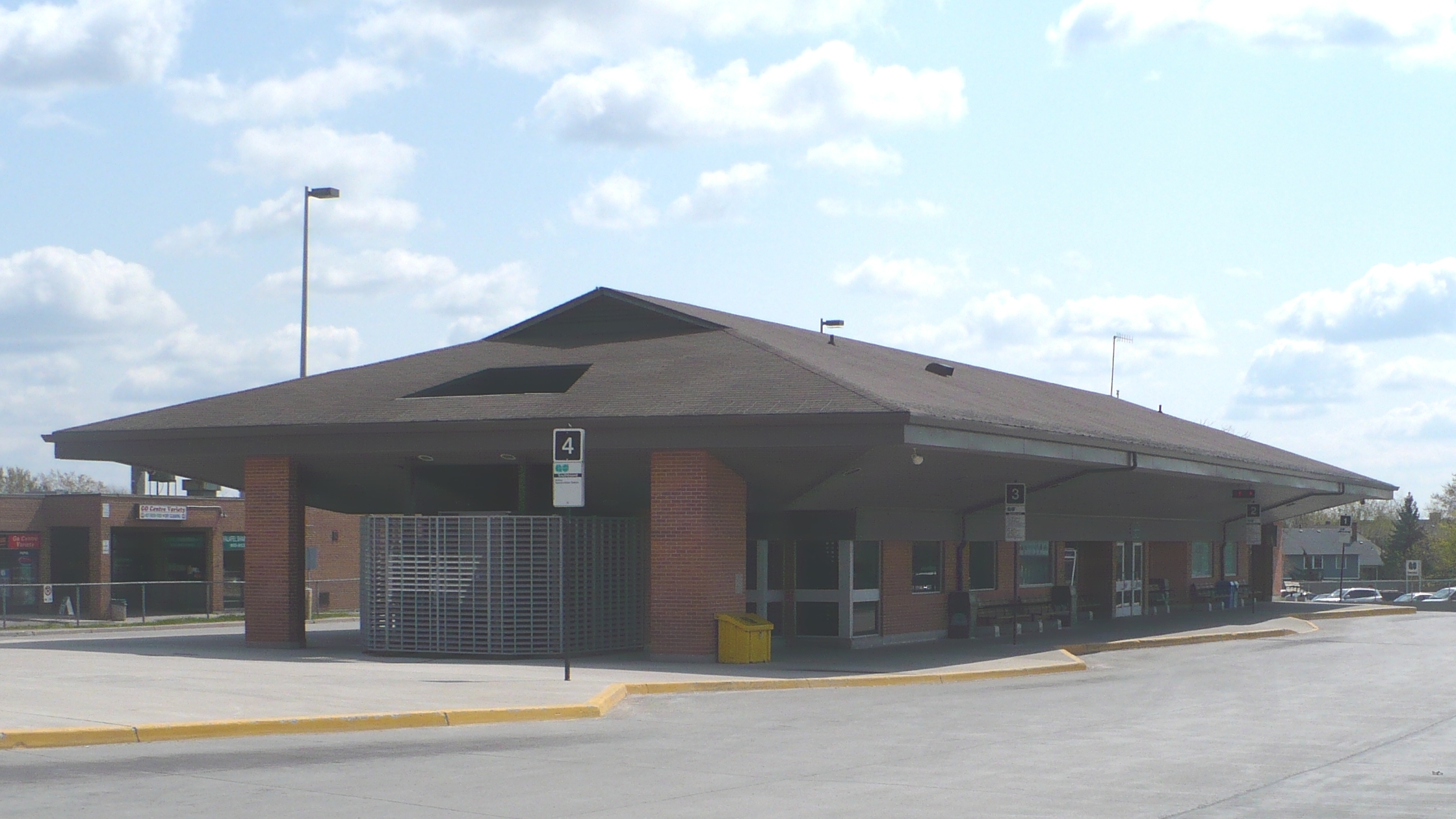
GO Transit bus station in Newmarket

Local public transit is provided by York Region Transit, which operates the Viva Blue bus rapid transit route from the Newmarket Bus Terminal to the Finch Bus Terminal in Toronto. YRT/VIVA has built the Davis Drive Rapidway along Davis Drive between Yonge Street and Southlake Regional Health Centre, with fully separated bus only lanes and centre street station platforms for their Viva Yellow service. The bus travels in mixed traffic between Southlake Regional Health Centre and Highway 404. The project was completed on November 29, 2015.

Commuter rail is provided by GO Transit through the Newmarket GO Station with service south to Toronto and north to Barrie, with five trains each direction during rush hour. Regular bus service is also operated by GO Transit, with service operating between 5am and 2am.

The town has many trails, the most useful of which is the Tom Taylor, which extends from the border of Aurora on St. John's side-road all the way north through downtown and down into Holland Landing in the Town of East Gwillimbury.

=== Library ===
Located in the historic Downtown area, the Newmarket Public Library provides residents with free access to 175,000 items, including books, audio books, magazines, multilingual materials, DVDs, CDs, video games, e-books and online databases. The library also runs the York Info service, which provides information about local organizations, groups and services, and helps develop a stronger volunteer presence in the community by connecting people who would like to volunteer with non-profit agencies looking for assistance. The library also produces a quarterly newsletter called "Off the Shelf" to inform patrons of its programs, services and events. The library is a founding member of the Shared Digital Infrastructure project, an initiative to plan for an Intelligent Community in Newmarket.

== Education ==
Public elementary and secondary education in Newmarket is overseen by York Region's two school boards: the York Region District School Board (YRDSB), and the York Catholic District School Board (YCDSB).

The YRDSB operates four secondary schools in Newmarket: Dr. John M. Denison Secondary School, Huron Heights Secondary School, Newmarket High School, and Sir William Mulock Secondary School, in addition to 15 elementary schools.

The YCDSB operates one secondary school in the town: Sacred Heart Catholic High School, and six elementary schools. There is also a Christian private elementary school, Newmarket District Christian Academy (NDCA), and a private Christian academy, Innova Academy.

Newmarket is also the home of Pickering College, an independent day and boarding school.

== Media ==
=== Print ===
Newmarket is within the coverage area of all major Toronto publications/newspapers.

Local print media was provided by The Newmarket Era (formerly the Era Banner), founded in 1852 when English immigrant printer G.S. Porter first published The New Era in Newmarket. On September 15, 2023, The Newmarket Era was moved to an online only format by parent company Metroland Media.

=== Radio ===
Newmarket is also well served by radio stations from Toronto.

Newmarket is also the town of licence for 88.5 CKDX-FM. Originally launched on February 28, 1980, as 1480 CKAN. Its studios were located in the Newmarket Plaza then relocated to the Tannery. The studios are currently located in Toronto with the transmitter located in King Township west of Newmarket/Aurora.

== Notable people ==
- John Candy, comedian/actor
- Jim Carrey, comedian/actor
- Munro Chambers, actor
- Frances Champagne, professor, neuroscientist
- Vince Corazza, actor
- Donald Davis, actor, won an Obie Award in 1960
- Lawrence Hill, novelist, essayist, and memoirist
- Florence Shirley Patterson Jones, astronomer
- Muriel Irwin MacDonald (1867-1918), journalist, editor, rancher
- H.R. MacMillan, CBE, C.C., forestry specialist and industrialist, wartime administrator, philanthropist
- William Mulock, Cabinet Minister and Chief Justice of the Supreme Court of Ontario
- Mazo de la Roche, author of the Jalna series
- Belinda Stronach, businesswoman, philanthropist, and former politician

=== Music ===
- Clarknova, alternative rock band
- The Elwins, rock band
- Hannah Georgas, pop singer
- Glass Tiger, rock band
- Lorne Lofsky, jazz guitarist
- Peter McGillivray, Opera singer (baritone)
- Alexander Muir, composer of The Maple Leaf Forever
- Steven Lee Olsen, country musician
- Tim Oxford, drummer for Arkells
- The Salads, punk rock band
- Serial Joe, rock band
- Tyler Stewart, drummer for Barenaked Ladies
- Tokyo Police Club, rock band
- Frank Walker, Musician, songwriter, DJ, record producer

=== Sports ===
==== Hockey ====
- Darren Archibald, DHL hockey player with the Grizzlys Wolfsburg
- Quinton Byfield, NHL hockey player for the Los Angeles Kings
- Herb Cain, former NHL hockey player, 1944 NHL scoring champion
- Daniel Catenacci, former NHL hockey player (Buffalo and New York Rangers)
- Dit Clapper, Hall of Fame hockey player
- B. J. Crombeen, former NHL hockey player
- Travis Dermott, AHL hockey player for the Bakersfield Condors
- Steve Downie, former NHL hockey player
- Brian Elliott, former NHL goaltender
- Kurtis Gabriel, former NHL hockey player
- Wes Jarvis, former AHL and NHL hockey player; former head coach of the Newmarket Hurricanes of the OPJHL; assistant coach with the Barrie Colts
- Mike Kitchen, former head coach for the St. Louis Blues
- Corey Locke, AHL hockey player and NHL draft pick
- Chuck Luksa, former WHA hockey player with Cincinnati Stingers
- Jamie Macoun, former NHL hockey player
- Connor McDavid, NHL hockey player for the Edmonton Oilers
- Joe Murphy, member of the 1990 Stanley Cup champion Edmonton Oilers
- Shayne Stevenson, former NHL player (Boston Bruins and Tampa Bay Lightning)
- Bill Thoms, former NHL star for the Toronto Maple Leafs, Chicago Black Hawks and Boston Bruins
- Rob Zepp, former hockey player in Europe and the NHL (Philadelphia Flyers)

==== Soccer ====
- Jim Brennan, Canada men's national soccer team member, first player signed to Toronto FC soccer club
- Marcel de Jong, Dutch-Canadian soccer player for Pacific FC

==== Baseball ====
- Mitch Bratt, MLB player for the Arizona Diamondbacks
- Pete Orr, Olympic baseball player and former Philadelphia Phillies infielder

==== Other ====
- Megan Oldham, Olympic gold medalist freestyle skiing
- Gabrielle Daleman, figure skater
- Liam Draxl, tennis player
- Scott Goodyear, Indycar racing driver
- Neil Harrison, curler
- Carlos Newton, former UFC Welterweight Champion; trainer/teacher at Warrior Martial Arts
- Kevin Pangos, basketball player at Gonzaga University and Canada youth international
- Sheila Reid, Olympic cross country runner
- Lindsay Seemann, swimmer; 200m Backstroke, 2008 Summer Olympics
- Elvis Stojko, figure skater
- Ashley Taws, racing driver
