= Southlake Regional Health Centre =

Public hospital in Ontario, Canada

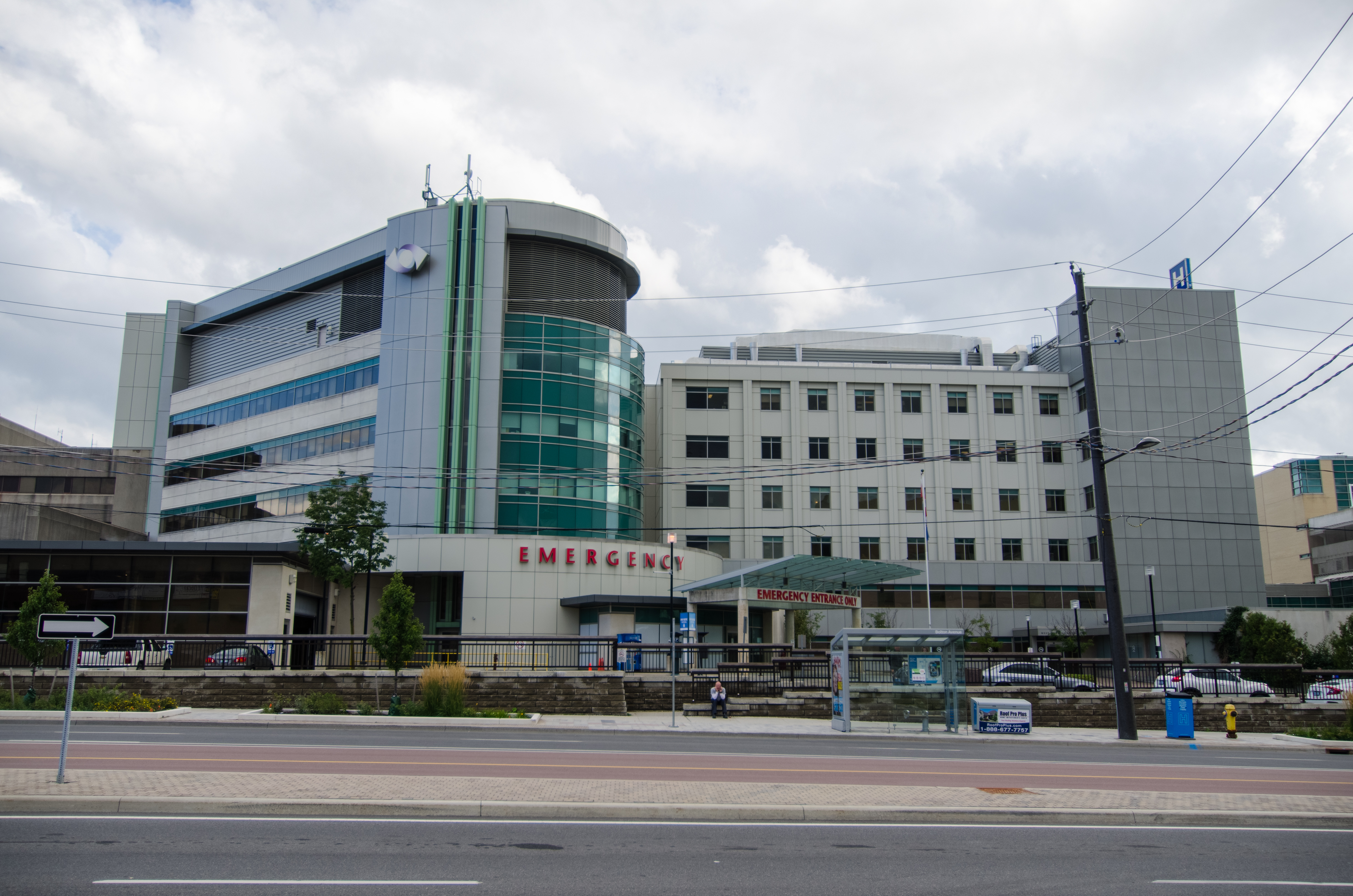

Geography
- Location: 596 Davis Drive, Newmarket, Ontario, Canada
- Coordinates: 44°03′38″N 79°27′11″W

Organization
- Care system: Public Medicare (Canada) (OHIP)
- Type: General

Services
- Emergency department: Yes
- Beds: 500

History
- Founded: 1922

Links
- Website: southlake.ca
- Lists: Hospitals in Canada

Southlake Regional Health Centre, formerly known as York County Hospital, is a hospital located in Newmarket, Ontario, Canada. Through various expansions during its history, it has grown into a university-affiliated teaching and research facility, specifically offering advanced cardiac, cancer, and thoracic care.

== Overview ==
Southlake Regional Health Centre is a full-service hospital with a regional focus.

Southlake offers over 400 patient beds and accommodates more than 90,000 visits to the Emergency Department, 22,000 in-patient admissions, and 600,000 out-patient visits each year.

Southlake employs a team of more than 3000, including over 540 physicians. In addition, there are 900 volunteers. Registered nurses and respiratory therapists are represented by the Ontario Nurses' Association Local 124.

== History ==
The hospital was founded on August 22, 1922, when the province granted a Charter of Incorporation for the York County Hospital Corporation. York County Hospital became a public hospital in 1924. In 1927, the new hospital building was completed by the architects Craig and Madill. In 1946, the Margaret Johnson Davis Wing opened with 55 beds. In 1956, the South Wing opened and a six-storey tower opened in 1964. Capacity was increased to 420 beds with the opening of the East Wing in 1976. On September 12, 1998, the name of the hospital was changed from York County Hospital to the present name. In 1999, a project to further expand the hospital was begun.

In October 2015, Southlake Regional Health Centre was once again named one of Greater Toronto's Top 100 Employers by a company named Mediacorp Canada Inc., and published by the Toronto Star.

The hospital is connected to the Southlake Regional Cancer Centre to its west and to a Medical Arts building by an arch bridge to its north, occupied principally by the University of Toronto's Family Medicine Teaching Unit and other health services. The Stronach Regional Cancer Centre is partnered with Princess Margaret Hospital.

== Teaching and research ==
The hospital has become a research and teaching facility through its relationships with the University of Toronto, York University, McMaster University, as well as Princess Margaret Hospital. Currently, the hospital is averaging more than 6000 medical training days per year, which is approximately triple its numbers in 2008.
