= Lemonville =

Lemonville may refer to:

- Lemonville, Ontario, Canada
- Lemonville, Texas, United States
