= Bethesda, Ontario =

Bethesda, Ontario may refer to:

- Bethesda, Simcoe County, Ontario
- Bethesda, York Regional Municipality, Ontario
