= Whitchurch-Stouffville =

Town in Ontario, Canada

- Town / Municipality (lower-tier)
- Town of Whitchurch-Stouffville
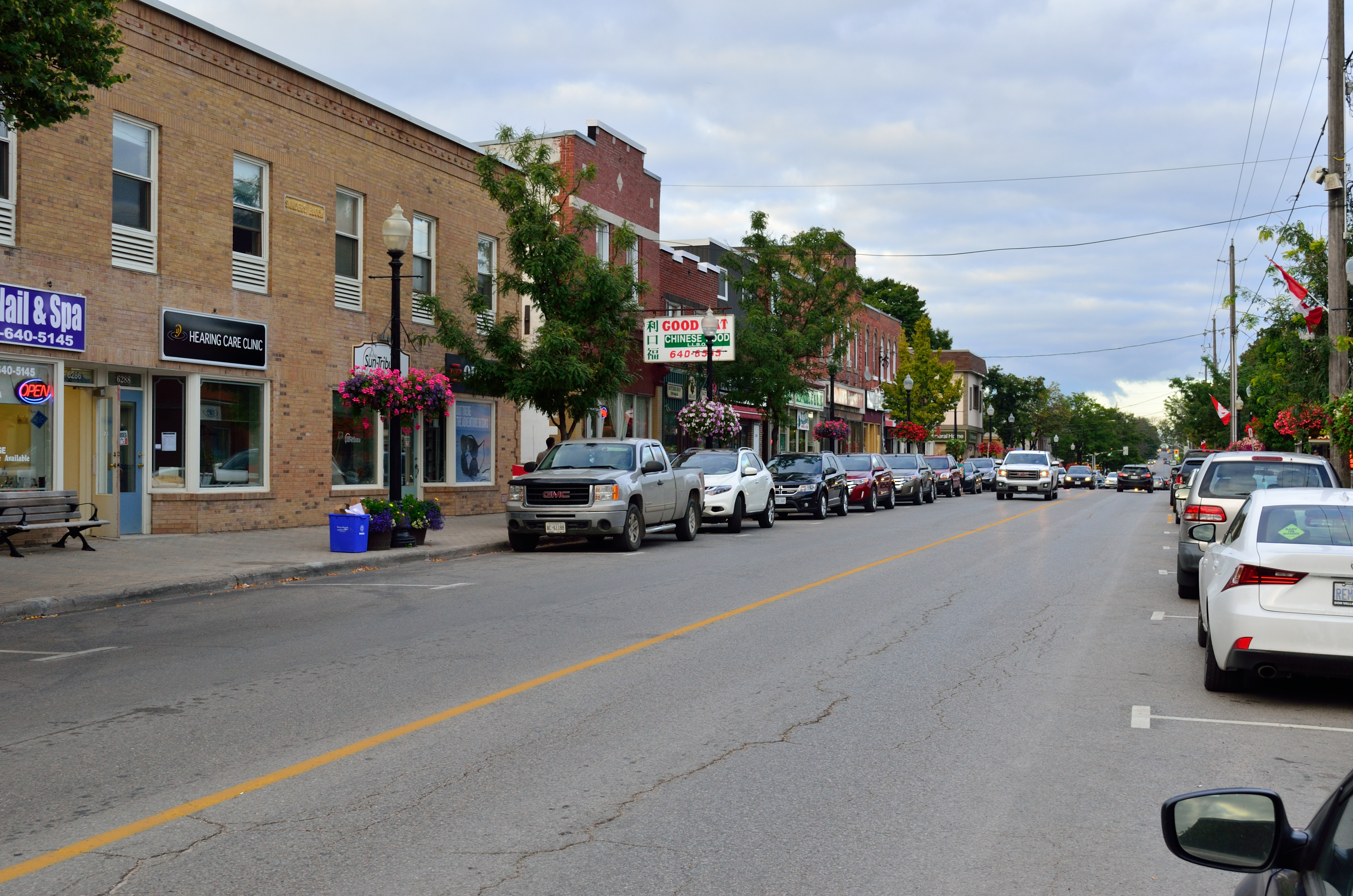
- Main Street, Whitchurch–Stouffville

- Flag Coat of arms
- Motto: Country - Close to the City.
- Location of Whitchurch–Stouffville within the Regional Municipality of York

- Whitchurch–Stouffville in relation to Southern Ontario
- Coordinates: 44°00′31″N 79°19′03″W
- Country: Canada
- Province: Ontario
- Regional municipality: York
- Incorporated: 1792 as the Township of Whitchurch
- Incorporated: 1877 as the Village of Stouffville
- Amalgamation: January 1, 1971

Government
  - Type: Municipality
  - Mayor: Iain Lovatt
  - Councillors: List: Hugo Kroon; Maurice Smith; Keith Acton; Rick Upton; Richard Bartley; Sue Sherban
  - MP: Helena Jaczek (L); Jacob Mantle (C)
  - MPP: Paul Calandra (PC)

Area (2021)
  - Total: 206.42 km^{2} (79.70 sq mi)
- Elevation: 239 m (784 ft)

Population (2021)
  - Total: 49,864
  - Density: 241.6/km^{2} (626/sq mi)
  - Growth: +8.8% (2,016–2,021)
- Time zone: UTC−05:00 (EST)
  - Summer (DST): UTC−04:00 (EDT)
- Forward sortation area: L0H (Gormley); L4A (Stouffville, Vandorf); L0G (Cedar Valley)
- Area codes: 905, 289, and 365
- Highways: Highway 48; Highway 404
- Website: www.townofws.ca

Whitchurch-Stouffville /ˈwɪtʃərtʃˈstoʊvɪl/ (population at the 2021 census 49,864) is a town in the Greater Toronto Area of Ontario, Canada, approximately 50 km (31 mi) north of downtown Toronto, and 55 km (34 mi) north-east of Toronto Pearson International Airport. It is 206.22 km^{2} (79.62 sq mi) in area, and located in the mid-eastern area of the Regional Municipality of York on the ecologically-sensitive Oak Ridges Moraine. Since 1993, its motto has been "Country - Close to the City".

The town is bounded by Davis Drive (York Regional Road 31) in the north, York-Durham Line (York Regional Road 30) in the east, and Highway 404 in the west. The southern boundary conforms with a position approximately 200 m (660 ft) north of 19th Avenue (York Regional Road 29), and is irregular due to the annexation of lands formerly part of Markham Township in 1971.

Between 2011 and 2021, the town grew 32.8%. The number of private dwellings jumped from 7,642 in 2001 to 16,705 in 2021, with an average of 3.0 people per private dwelling. The town projects a total population of 72,109 by 2031, and 91,654 in 2041, with most of the growth within the urban boundaries of the Community of Stouffville plus lands adjacent to Highway 48 and south of Stouffville Road. Future growth is governed provincially by the Oak Ridges Moraine Conservation Act (2001), the Greenbelt Protection Act (2005) and the Places to Grow Act (2005). The intent of these statutes is to prevent urban sprawl on environmentally sensitive land and to protect the ecological integrity of the moraine and its hydrological features.

== Communities ==
The Town of Whitchurch–Stouffville consists of several distinct communities and the intermediary countryside. The largest urban area is the community of Stouffville proper (2021 pop. 36,753), and other communities in the larger town include Ballantrae, Bethesda, Bloomington, Cedar Valley, Gormley, Lemonville, Lincolnville, Musselman's Lake, Pine Orchard, Pleasantville, Preston Lake, Ringwood, Vandorf, Vivian, and Wesley Corners.

== History ==
The oldest human artifacts found in Whitchurch Township date to 1500 BC and were found in the hamlet of Ringwood (now part of urban Stouffville). Prior to the arrival of Europeans, two Native trails crossed through what is today Whitchurch–Stouffville. The Vandorf Trail ran from the source waters of the Rouge River to Newmarket, across the heights of the hamlet of Vandorf. The Rouge Trail ran along the Rouge River and northwest from Musselman Lake; both were part of the aboriginal and Coureur des bois trail system leading through dense forests from Lake Ontario to Lake Simcoe. The territory was the site of several Native villages, including Iroquoian peoples' settlements around Preston Lake, Vandorf, and Musselman Lake.

In 2003, a large 16th-century ancestral Huron village was discovered in Stouffville during land development; approximately 2000 people once inhabited the site (Mantle Site), from 1578 to 1623. A palisade protected more than 70 longhouses, and tens of thousands of artifacts were excavated here.

In 2012, archaeologists revealed that a European forged-iron axehead, believed to be Basque, was discovered at the site--"the earliest European piece of iron ever found in the North American interior." Other significant late precontact Huron village sites have been located to the south-east (the earlier Draper Site on the Pickering Airport lands) and to the north-west of urban Stouffville (the later Ratcliff or Baker Hill Site on Ontario Highway 48, and the Old Fort or Aurora Site on Kennedy Road).

The western end of Whitchurch and Markham townships was purchased by the British crown from the Mississaugas of the New Credit First Nation in 1787 as part of the Toronto Purchase. Whitchurch Township was created in 1792 as one of ten townships in York County. It was named in honour of the village of Whitchurch, Herefordshire in England, where the family of Elizabeth Simcoe lived (she was the wife of the Lieutenant Governor of Upper Canada Sir John Graves Simcoe). The first European settlements in Whitchurch Township were established in the 1790s. The south-Central Ontario Mississaugas did not formally cede these areas of Whitchurch and southern Ontario until 1923.

Between 1800 and 1802, John Stegman completed a survey of the township, which created a system of land concessions. This allowed for the organized distribution of land to settlers, with each concession containing five, 200-acre (0.81 km^{2}) lots. This layout remains visible today, as the road network in the area reflects the locations of the boundaries between concession blocks.

Early settlers of this period included Quakers and Mennonites—two pacifist groups from the nearby American states of Pennsylvania, Vermont and New York. Both groups were seeking religious freedom, and were identified by the Upper Canadian government as people with necessary skills and abilities for establishing viable communities that could, in turn, attract others to settle in the region. The Crown also granted land in Upper Canada to mercenary German Hessian soldiers, such as Stegman, in exchange for their service against the Thirteen Colonies in the American Revolution.

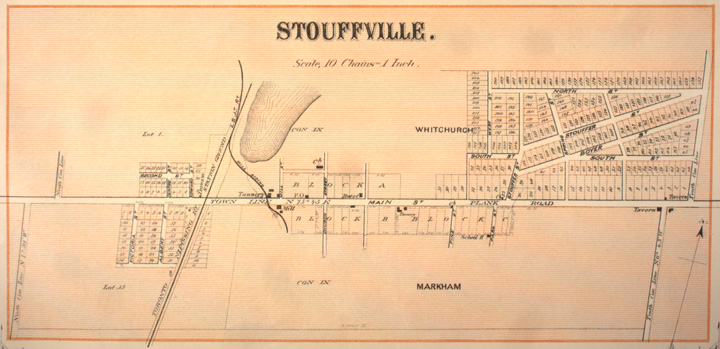
Map, Village of Stouffville, 1880

Many of the first settlements in Whitchurch Township were developed at the intersections of main roads throughout the township and /or near streams where mills could be built to process the timber cleared from the land. Stoufferville was one such hamlet, developing around the saw and grist mills of Abraham Stouffer, a Mennonite who with his wife Elizabeth Reesor Stouffer immigrated from Chambersburg, Pennsylvania in 1804. He acquired 600 acres (2.4 km^{2}) of land. Elizabeth's brother Peter Reesor established what is today Markham, first called Reesorville. Fifty-five more families from Pennsylvania, mostly Mennonite, arrived in Stoufferville in the next few years. Stouffer's sawmill was in operation by 1817 on Duffin's Creek on the Whitchurch side of Main Street. By 1825 he had a gristmill across the street on the Markham Township side of Main St. as well.

In the early 1830s, the old Stouffville Road was carved through largely virgin forest to connect York (Toronto) with Brock Township; a post office was opened in 1832 and the name Stouffville was standardized. In 1839, a new resident from England noted that Stouffville still had "no church (other than the Mennonite Meeting House in neighbouring Altona), baker, or butcher," though "saddlebag [Methodist circuit] preachers sometimes arrived and held meetings at the schoolhouse." Stouffville was considered a centre "of Radical opinion," one of the "hotbeds of revolution," and it was here that William Lyon Mackenzie set forth his plan for the Upper Canada Rebellion of 1837–38.

The hamlet of Stouffville grew rapidly in the 1840s, and by 1849, it had "one physician and surgeon, two stores, two taverns, one blacksmith, one waggon maker, one oatmeal mill, one tailor, one shoemaker." The population reached 350 in 1851, 600 in 1866, and 866 in 1881, with a diversity of Mennonite, Methodist, Presbyterian, Episcopal, Baptist and Congregational places of worship. In 1869 Ballantrae had a population of 75, Bloomington 50, Gormley 80, Lemonville 75, and Ringwood 100. In 1876, there was a regular stage coach connection from the hamlet of Stouffville to Ringwood, Ballantrae, Lemonville, Glasgow, Altona and Claremont.

In 1877, Stouffville became an incorporated village. Stouffville's growth was aided by the establishment of the Toronto and Nipissing Railway, built in 1871, which connected Stouffville and Uxbridge with Toronto. In 1877, a second track was built north to Jackson's Point on Lake Simcoe. These connections were created in large part to provide a reliable and efficient means of transporting timber harvested and milled in these regions. Soon Stouffville Junction serviced thirty trains per day. During this time of prosperity, Stouffville businessman R.J. Daley built a large music hall, roller-skating rink, and curling rink. In 1911 Stouffville had a public library, two banks, two newspapers, as well as telephone and telegraph connections.

Intensive forestry in Whitchurch Township led to large-scale deforestation, eroding the thinner soils of northern Whitchurch into sand deserts; by 1850 Whitchurch Township was only 35 per cent wooded, and that was reduced to 7 per cent by 1910. The Lake Simcoe Junction Railway Line was consequently abandoned in 1927. Reforestation efforts were begun locally, and with the passage of the Reforestation Act (1911), the process of reclaiming these areas began. Vivian Forest, a large conservation area in northern Whitchurch–Stouffville, was established in 1924 for this purpose. This development has helped to restore the water-holding capacity of the soil and to reduce the cycles of flash spring floods and summer drought. In 2008, the town had more than 62²km of protected forest; the forest is considered one of the most successful restorations of a degraded landscape in North America. Yet similar environmental consequences due to increased urbanization were projected in 2007 by the Toronto and Region Conservation Authority as probable for southern Whitchurch–Stouffville (headwaters of the Rouge River watershed) if targeted plantings in this area did not begin quickly. Already in 1993, the Whitchurch Historical Committee warned a new generation of "Whitchurch-Stouffville residents" to be "vigilant to treat trees and forests with respect ... In the 1990s care must be taken so that urbanization and concrete road-building do not repeat the destruction to our forest heritage."

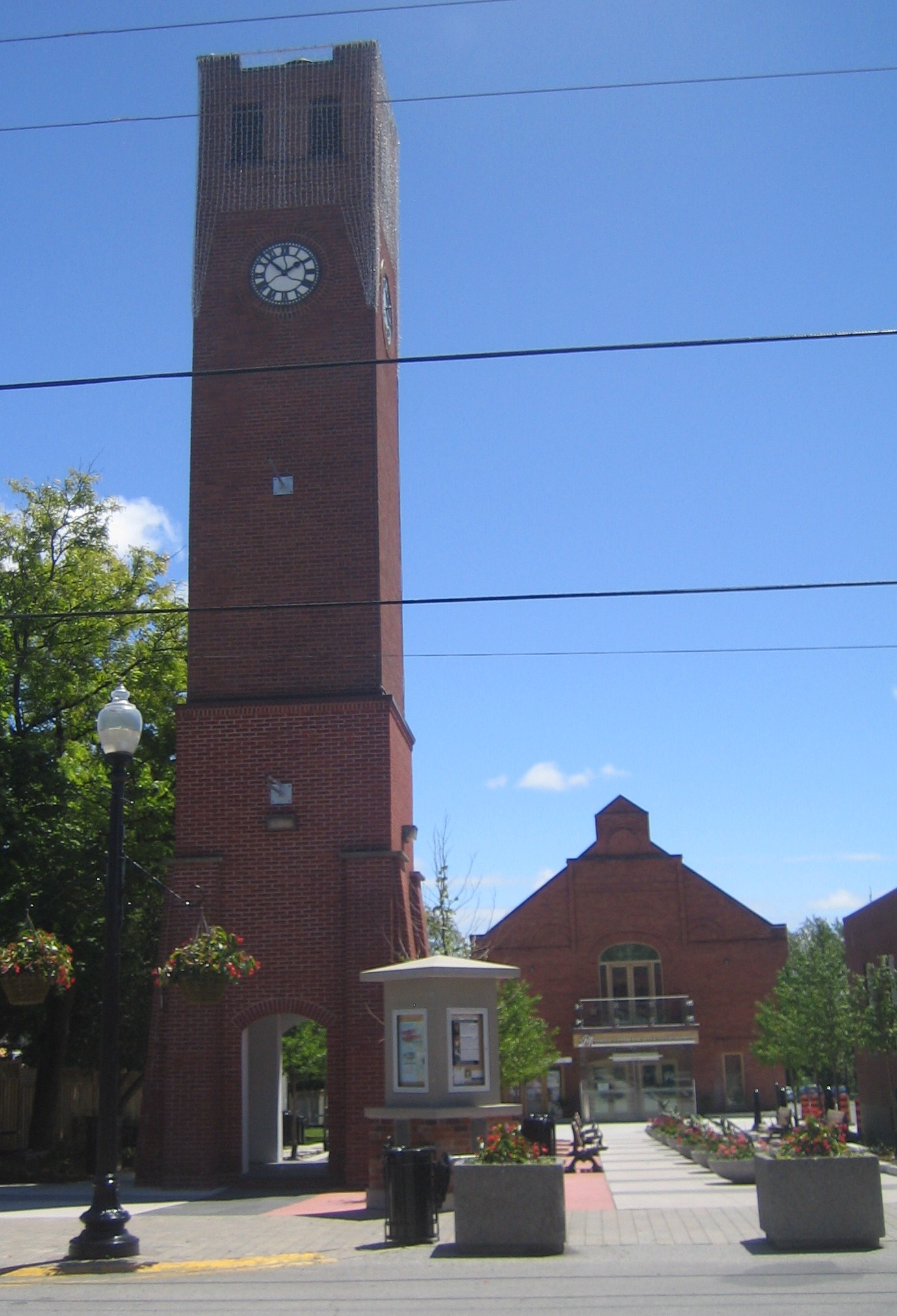
Clock tower and The Lebovic Centre for Arts and Entertainment

Though growth in the hamlets of Whitchurch–Stouffville was stagnant after the demise of the forest industry, the population began to grow again in the 1970s, with development in Metropolitan Toronto and the consequent arrival of new commuters. These developments led to a reexamination at the provincial level of municipal governance. On January 1, 1971, Whitchurch Township and the Village of Stouffville were merged to create the Town of Whitchurch–Stouffville; the combined population was 11,487. The town's southern boundary was also moved four farm lots south of the original southern boundary of Main Street. This land was formerly a part of Markham Township.

Whitchurch–Stouffville adopted its coat of arms in 1973 (see information box right). The dove of peace, the original seal of Whitchurch Township, is at the crest, recalling the pacifist Quaker and Mennonite settlers who founded many of the town's communities, including Stouffville. The British Union banner of 1707 pays tribute to the United Empire Loyalists. The white church symbolizes Whitchurch, and the star and chalice come from the Stouffer family (Swiss) coat of arms.

The growth of Toronto brought serious ecological problems to Whitchurch–Stouffville. Between 1962 and 1969, hundreds of thousands of litres per month of sulfuric acid, calcium hydroxide, and oil waste were poured into unlined Whitchurch–Stouffville dumps never designed as landfill sites and situated directly above the town's main aquifer. This was followed by years of solid waste from Toronto (1,100 tons per day in 1982). In the early 1980s, a group initially named "Concerned Mothers" found that the miscarriage rate in Whitchurch–Stouffville was 26% compared to the provincial average of 15%, and that the town had a high rate of cancer and birth defects. Though the Ministry of Environment was satisfied that the wells tested in 1974 and 1981 had negligible levels of cancer causing agents (mutagens), the town opposed the expansion of the "York Sanitation Site #4". Only after much grass-roots advocacy at the provincial level was the site ordered to close on June 30, 1983. In 1984 it was reported in the Legislative Assembly of Ontario that PCBs were found in well-water, and that 27,000 gallons of contaminated leachate per day were leaking from the site, threatening ground water quality.

With new commuter rail service on the Stouffville Line in the 1990s, the drilling of two deep aquifer wells to secure safer water for a large, new development in the hamlet of Ballantrae in 1996, and the controversial expansion of the York-Durham Sewage System Big Pipe with additional water capacity from Lake Ontario, Whitchurch–Stouffville began a major self-transformation. Not unlike the late 19th century, responsible land and water stewardship, as well as the positive integration of many new residents annually into the community, define the challenges and opportunities for Whitchurch–Stouffville in the years to come.

The most significant challenge facing Whitchurch–Stouffville in coming years, however, is the federal government's potential development of an international airport immediately south-east of Whitchurch–Stouffville (the Pickering Airport lands). Under the current draft plan, approaches for two of the three landing strips would be directly above Whitchurch–Stouffville communities: the first over Ballantrae, Musselman's Lake and the north-east corner of urban Stouffville, with planes descending (or ascending) from 535 to 365 metres (with an allowable building height in Stouffville of 43 metres); the second over Gormley and the Dickson Hill area (near the Walmart and Smart Centre). A "Needs Assessment Study" was completed by the Greater Toronto Airports Authority for the federal government in May 2010. After a "due diligence review," Transport Canada released the report in July 2011, which identified the most likely time range for the need of the airport to be 2027–2029, and confirmed the site layout proposed in the 2004 Draft Plan Report.

In late 2019, the town decided to drop the word Whitchurch from signs, for "branding" reasons. While signs would indicate "Town of Stouffville", the official name remained Whitchurch-Stouffville.

== Government ==
=== Municipal ===
Whitchurch–Stouffville is governed by a mayor and six councillors, with one councillor representing each of the six municipal wards. The mayor of Whitchurch–Stouffville represents the town on the York Regional Council. The original ward boundaries were created with amalgamation in 1971, and were amended in 2009 for the 2010 municipal elections and again in 2021 for the 2022 municipal elections. As of the 2022 election, the mayor is Iain Lovatt.

One York Region District School Board trustee is elected to represent Whitchurch–Stouffville and Aurora, as well as one trustee for the York Catholic District School Board. A French Public School Board trustee and a French Catholic School Board trustees are also elected on the same ballot as the mayor and town councillors.

In 2008, 94.4% of Whitchurch–Stouffville residents were either satisfied or very satisfied with the overall quality of life in the Town of Whitchurch–Stouffville. In a major community survey, close to 30% of the respondents described the town as fine, good, nice, great, or pleasant; more than half of the respondents liked the community or small-town feel; and 46.3% enjoyed the friendly neighbourhoods. The most important municipal issues indicated by residents in 2008 were the need to improve the road system; traffic issues; increasing urbanization and overcrowding; land use development and sprawl; and the cost of living (including taxes and user fees) in the town. Environmental protection, including environmental assessments for new development and natural preservation measures, was identified as matter of high importance by residents, but low on a scale of satisfaction. In the hamlet of Musselman's Lake, 72% of residents in 2009 were concerned about the environmental health of the lake and the surrounding community.

In August 2011, the municipal offices were moved into a business park area at 111 Sandiford Drive in Stouffville. The municipal offices were previously at 37 Sandiford Drive (2008) and Civic Avenue (1959).

==== List of mayors ====
- Ken Laushway, 1971–1972
- Gordon Ratcliff, 1973–1978
- Eldred King (1927–2011), 1978–1984 - Markham school trustee 1965–1968, served as York Region chair 1985–1997 and GO Transit Board member; lived in Stouffville and later in Uxbridge
- Tom Wood, 1984–1985
- Fran Sainsbury, 1985–1994
- Wayne Emmerson, 1994–2003 - current York Region chair (2015–)
- Susan Sherban, 2003–2006
- Wayne Emmerson, 2006–2014
- Justin Altmann, 2014–2018
- Iain Lovatt, 2018–present

=== Provincial ===
At the provincial level Whitchurch–Stouffville is in the Markham-Stouffville electoral district. Since 2018 this riding has been represented at the Legislative Assembly of Ontario by Paul Calandra, a member of the governing Progressive Conservative Party of Ontario.

=== Federal ===
At the federal level Whitchurch–Stouffville is in the ridings of Markham—Stouffville and York—Durham. Since the federal election of October 2019, Markham—Stouffville has been represented by Helena Jaczek, former Minister of Community and Social Services in Ontario. Since the federal election of April 2025, the town is also represented by Jacob Mantle of the Conservative Party of Canada.

== Geography and environment ==
The greatest portion of Whitchurch–Stouffville lies on the Oak Ridges Moraine. The moraine consists of knobby hills between 290 and 373 meters above sea level of irregularly bedded layers of unconsolidated sand and gravel (built-up glacial debris) deposited by the meltwater of the Wisconsin glacier some twenty-five thousand to ten thousand years ago. In a few cases the retreating glacier left behind and buried huge blocks of ice which, when melted, created deep, water-filled depressions known as kettle lakes. Preston Lake, Van Nostrand Lake and Musselman Lake are three such examples.

The boundaries of Whitchurch–Stouffville contain a watershed divide. Streams and rivers at the top of the Oak Ridges Moraine flow northward into the Lake Simcoe basin, part of the Lake Huron watershed. The southern sections (south of Bloomington Road) make up the headwaters of the Rouge River and Duffins Creek, both of which flow into the Lake Ontario basin. These headwaters include many smaller streams and creeks throughout southern Whitchurch–Stouffville. Their identification and protection, plus reforestation in these area, has been identified as urgent for rebuilding water-capacity in the Rouge River watershed which can off-set the worst environmental impacts (e.g., flash flooding, erosion and ground water contamination) of rapid urbanization. The heavily wooded Vivian Infiltration Area is an environmentally significant hydrological infiltration area that contributes groundwater to the Oak Ridges aquifer complex.

The northwestern corner of Whitchurch–Stouffville is outside the moraine and is part of the Schomberg Lake plain, an ancient lake-bed overlain by silts and fine sands. The soil formed over the former lake-bed is well-drained, arable farmland. The southernmost portion of Whitchurch–Stouffville west of Highway 48 lies below the moraine and is a clay-loam till plain.

Tree species native to Whitchurch–Stouffville include: American mountain ash, balsam fir, bitternut hickory, black cherry, black spruce, bur oak, eastern hemlock, eastern white cedar, peachleaf willow, pin cherry, red oak, red maple, red pine, shagbark hickory, silver maple, sugar maple, tamarack, trembling aspen, white birch, white oak, white pine and white spruce. In 2012, Whitchurch–Stouffville's forest cover was 28.9%.

Whitchurch–Stouffville's water supply system is both groundwater-based with five municipal wells and since 2009 lake-based (Lake Ontario) as well. 5,500 cubic metres of water are withdrawn from the Oak Ridges Aquifer and the Thorncliffe Aquifer daily. Stouffville's well-water is chlorinated for disinfection, and sodium silicate is added to keep iron from staining plumbing fixtures and laundry. Two wells receive additional disinfection through an ultraviolet (UV) system. Three groundwater wells are in close proximity to the settlement area of Stouffville (Main Street, east of 10th Line); consequently 239 "significant drinking water threats" have been identified.

Whitchurch–Stouffville has a continental climate moderated by the Great Lakes and influenced by warm, moist air masses from the south, and cold, dry air from the north. The Oak Ridges Moraine affects levels of precipitation: as air masses arrive from Lake Ontario and reach the elevated ground surface of the moraine, they rise, causing precipitation.

Under the Köppen climate classification, Stouffville has a humid continental climate (Köppen Dfb) with warm, humid summers and cold winters.

Climate data for Stouffville Climate ID: 6158084; coordinates 43°58′N 79°15′W; elevation: 266.7 m (875 ft), 1971–2000 normals, extremes 1971–1993
Month	Jan	Feb	Mar	Apr	May	Jun	Jul	Aug	Sep	Oct	Nov	Dec	Year
Record high °C (°F)	11.0 (51.8)	13.5 (56.3)	23.0 (73.4)	30.5 (86.9)	32.0 (89.6)	34.0 (93.2)	35.5 (95.9)	36.5 (97.7)	32.8 (91.0)	25.5 (77.9)	22.8 (73.0)	18.0 (64.4)	36.5 (97.7)
Mean daily maximum °C (°F)	−3.2 (26.2)	−2.4 (27.7)	3.1 (37.6)	11.1 (52.0)	18.5 (65.3)	23.1 (73.6)	26.2 (79.2)	24.7 (76.5)	19.9 (67.8)	12.8 (55.0)	6.0 (42.8)	−0.6 (30.9)	11.6 (52.9)
Mean daily minimum °C (°F)	−11.6 (11.1)	−10.9 (12.4)	−5.7 (21.7)	1.2 (34.2)	7.4 (45.3)	11.8 (53.2)	14.8 (58.6)	14 (57)	9.6 (49.3)	3.5 (38.3)	−1.0 (30.2)	−7.7 (18.1)	2.1 (35.8)
Record low °C (°F)	−35.5 (−31.9)	−28.3 (−18.9)	−28.0 (−18.4)	−17.0 (1.4)	−3.3 (26.1)	0.0 (32.0)	7.0 (44.6)	2.5 (36.5)	−2.0 (28.4)	−7.2 (19.0)	−15.0 (5.0)	−31.5 (−24.7)	−35.5 (−31.9)
Average precipitation mm (inches)	52.8 (2.08)	53.5 (2.11)	62.8 (2.47)	65.5 (2.58)	81.2 (3.20)	73.3 (2.89)	75.8 (2.98)	99.3 (3.91)	79.2 (3.12)	81.2 (3.20)	78.5 (3.09)	65.6 (2.58)	868.6 (34.20)
Average rainfall mm (inches)	17.9 (0.70)	23.3 (0.92)	43.5 (1.71)	60.5 (2.38)	81.1 (3.19)	73.3 (2.89)	75.8 (2.98)	99.3 (3.91)	79.2 (3.12)	80.6 (3.17)	70.3 (2.77)	33.0 (1.30)	737.7 (29.04)
Average snowfall cm (inches)	34.9 (13.7)	30.2 (11.9)	19.3 (7.6)	5.0 (2.0)	0.1 (0.0)	0.0 (0.0)	0.0 (0.0)	0.0 (0.0)	0.0 (0.0)	0.6 (0.2)	8.2 (3.2)	32.7 (12.9)	131.0 (51.6)
Average precipitation days (≥ 0.2 mm)	11.0	10.3	10.1	10.8	11.0	10.7	9.2	10.8	10.4	13.0	12.6	12.3	131.9
Average rainy days (≥ 0.2 mm)	2.9	3.1	6.2	9.8	11.0	10.7	9.2	10.8	10.4	13.0	10.7	5.1	102.6
Average snowy days (≥ 0.2 cm)	8.4	7.7	4.7	1.2	0.1	0.0	0.0	0.0	0.0	0.2	2.6	8.3	33.1
Source: Environment and Climate Change Canada

Because of increasing greenhouse gas emissions, the Ontario Ministry of Natural Resources estimates a 1 degree increase in summer and 2 degree increase in winter average temperatures in the region between 2011 and 2040, and a 0% to 10% decrease in precipitation (compared to averages between 1970 and 2000).

Smog producing ground-level ozone is a problem affecting the entire Greater Toronto Area. A major pathway for airborne pollutants flows from the upper Midwest United States and the Ohio River Valley and across southern Ontario and Toronto; key sources are coal-burning power-plants and vehicle engines. On episode days (O3 > 82 ppb), Whitchurch–Stouffville reaches its peak about one to two hours later than Toronto. Smog Advisory Alerts are issued by the Ministry of the Environment when smog conditions are expected to reach the poor category in Ontario. The Greater Toronto Area had 13 smog days in 2008, 29 in 2007, 11 in 2006, 48 in 2005.

== Demographics ==
Historical population
Year	Pop.	±%
1851	350	—
1866	600	+71.4%
1881	866	+44.3%
1901	1,223	+41.2%
1911	1,034	−15.5%
1971	11,487	+1010.9%
1976	13,129	+14.3%
1981	13,882	+5.7%
1986	15,725	+13.3%
1991	19,036	+21.1%
1996	20,485	+7.6%
2001	22,859	+11.6%
2006	24,390	+6.7%
2011	37,628	+54.3%
2016	45,837	+21.8%
2021	49,864	+8.8%
Figures for 1851 to 1911 are for the Village of Stouffville alone. Beginning in 1971, figures are for the consolidated Town of Whitchurch-Stouffville. Sources: 1804–1866 (cf. "History" above); 1901; 1911; 1971–2006; 2011 2016;

In the 2021 Census of Population conducted by Statistics Canada, Whitchurch-Stouffville had a population of 49,864 living in 16,707 of its 17,154 total private dwellings, a change of 8.8% from its 2016 population of 45,837. With a land area of 206.42 km^{2} (79.70 sq mi), it had a population density of 241.6/km^{2} (625.7/sq mi) in 2021.

In 2021 with a population of 49,864, 35% of residents were immigrants.

=== Religion ===
Religion	Population (2021)	Per cent
Total	49,864	
Christian (total)	26,220	52.6%
Roman Catholic (subtotal of Christian)	12,290	24.6%
Christian Orthodox (subtotal of Christian)	2,360	4.7%
Hindu	3,510	7.0%
Muslim	2,660	2.4%
Buddhist	1,040	2.0%
Jewish	435	0.9%
Sikh	410	0.8%
No religious affiliation	15,035	23%

=== Ethnicity ===
The number of visible minorities grew from 4.53% in 2001, to 24.5% in 2011 and 45.8% in 2021 (the trend is expected to continue through 2031). The most common non-European ethnic origins represented in Whitchurch-Stoufville as per the 2021 census are Chinese (17%), Indian (India) (5.2%), Sri Lankan (3.2%), Filipino (3%), and Tamil (2.8%)<

Visible Minority Population	Population 2021	Per cent
Total	22,860	45.8%
Chinese	9,250	18.5%
South Asians	6,830	13.7%
Black	1,385	2.8%
Filipino	1,350	2.7%

Panethnic groups in the Town of Whitchurch–Stouffville (2001−2021)
Panethnic group	2021		2016		2011		2006		2001	
Panethnic group	Pop.	%	Pop.	%	Pop.	%	Pop.	%	Pop.	%
European (Note: Statistic includes all persons that did not make up part of a visible minority or an indigenous identity.)	26,135	52.88%	28,260	62.32%	27,765	74.62%	22,175	92.01%	20,735	94.96%
East Asian (Note: Statistic includes total responses of "Chinese", "Korean", and "Japanese" under visible minority section on census.)	9,685	19.6%	6,290	13.87%	3,200	8.6%	790	3.28%	425	1.95%
South Asian	6,830	13.82%	5,635	12.43%	2,980	8.01%	395	1.64%	205	0.94%
Southeast Asian (Note: Statistic includes total responses of "Filipino" and "Southeast Asian" under visible minority section on census.)	1,695	3.43%	1,445	3.19%	980	2.63%	145	0.6%	60	0.27%
African	1,385	2.8%	1,005	2.22%	805	2.16%	260	1.08%	115	0.53%
Middle Eastern (Note: Statistic includes total responses of "West Asian" and "Arab" under visible minority section on census.)	1,175	2.38%	800	1.76%	415	1.12%	65	0.27%	110	0.5%
Latin American	535	1.08%	355	0.78%	185	0.5%	25	0.1%	30	0.14%
Indigenous	425	0.86%	340	0.75%	310	0.83%	145	0.6%	115	0.53%
Other/multiracial (Note: Statistic includes total responses of "Visible minority, n.i.e." and "Multiple visible minorities" under visible minority section on census.)	1,550	3.14%	1,205	2.66%	575	1.55%	120	0.5%	65	0.3%
Total responses	49,425	99.12%	45,345	98.93%	37,210	98.89%	24,100	98.81%	21,835	99.21%
Total population	49,864	100%	45,837	100%	37,628	100%	24,390	100%	22,008	100%
Note: Totals greater than 100% due to multiple origin responses

=== Language ===
According to the 2021 Census, English is the mother tongue for 61.4% of Whitchurch–Stouffville residents. Immigrant languages with the most native speakers are Cantonese (8.2%), Mandarin (4.5%) and Tamil (3.8%). In 2018–19, 43% of the Grade 3 children in one of the community's newer schools were effectively bi-lingual (i.e., the first language learned at home was other than English).

== Infrastructure ==
=== Transportation ===
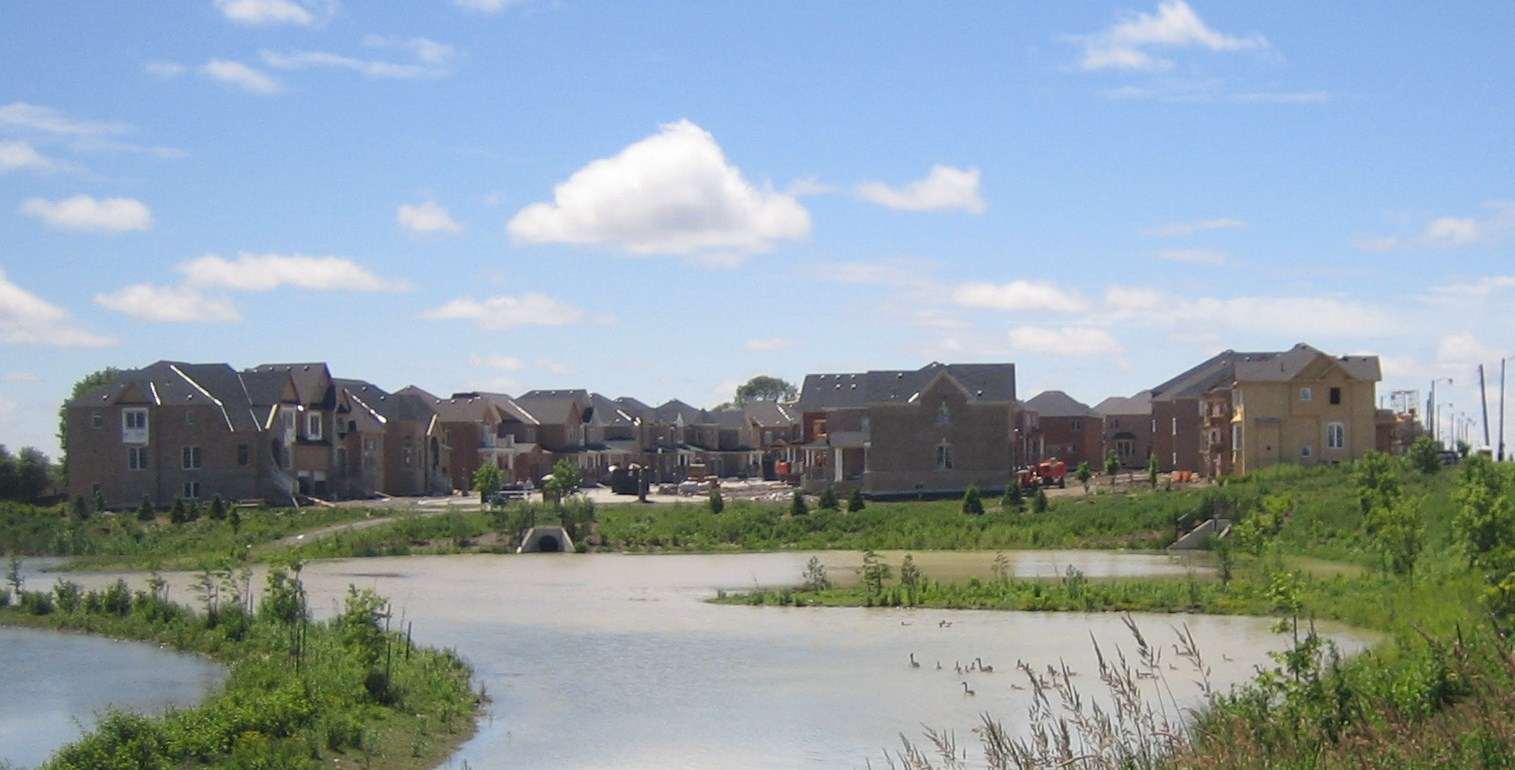
New construction in urban Stouffville, 2010

Primarily roadways include Highway 48, Highway 407, and Highway 404, which are in turn complemented by a network of regional roads that form a grid pattern across the town. In 1994, a plan to connect urban Stouffville directly to Highway 401 via the proposed East Metro Freeway was cancelled in large part due to the concerns of residents and the work of the Rouge River activist groups. Ninth Line has since been widened to handle traffic load south to Highway 407 in Markham and onto Highway 404 to connect with Highway 401.

Whitchurch–Stouffville is traversed by two railway lines: One is Canadian National Railway's primary freight corridor connecting Greater Toronto to Northern Ontario and Western Canada, which is being considered for future GO Transit train service with stations in the communities of Vandorf and Gormley (West). The other railway line, formerly the Toronto and Nipissing Railway, is now owned by GO Transit and hosts Stouffville line passenger service to and from Toronto. This line includes two stations in Whitchurch–Stouffville: the Stouffville GO Station in urban Stouffville, and the line's terminus, Old Elm GO Station, located to Stouffville's northeast. The York-Durham Heritage Railway did run historical trains between the station and Uxbridge on summer weekends but since 2022 the line has folded.

Until 2012, York Region Transit (YRT) operated two routes (9 and 15) within urban Stouffville, with connection to the Markham-Stouffville Hospital and other Markham routes. With the 2012 York Region Transit Service Plan, the two routes were merged, and the frequency of direct buses to the hospital YRT transit hub was reduced. In February 2014, a new Route 15 was introduced, connecting Stouffville to Yonge Street in Richmond Hill and to a future GO-Station in Gormley. GO Transit operates bus services in Stouffville, with buses traveling south into Markham and to Union Station, Toronto, as well as services north to the Town of Uxbridge.

Despite excellent access to the GO Transit and York Region Transit systems, the two systems are not integrated. In 2011, only 6.9% of working Whitchurch–Stouffville residents used public transit to get to work (compare 14% for Ontario), and only 2.7% walked or cycled to work (compare 3.6% for Whitchurch–Stouffville in 2006, and 6.3% for Ontario in 2011). Excellent public transportation options is an increasingly urgent issue for Whitchurch–Stouffville as the town continues to grow with residents who commute daily to Toronto (see Economy below).

=== Other amenities ===
The Markham Stouffville Hospital is a multi-site hospital that serves approximately 400,000 people in the communities of Markham, Uxbridge, and Whitchurch–Stouffville. The main hospital site is in Markham, 10 kilometers south of urban Stouffville on Ninth Line, and linked by public transportation from Stouffville. The hospital opened in 1990 and, after a successful $50 million expansion campaign, completed a 385,000 sq. ft. addition and renovation project in 2014. The expanded hospital employs an additional 875 staff and 60 new physicians. Residents in northern Whitchurch–Stouffville live in close proximity to the Southlake Regional Health Centre in neighbouring Newmarket.

The York-Durham Aphasia Centre is located in Stouffville's Parkview Village, and is a program of March of Dimes Canada.

The Town of Whitchurch–Stouffville is policed by the York Regional Police (YRP) and is located within Number Five District; a new Whitchurch–Stouffville Community Sub-Station was opened at 111 Sandiford Drive in 2014. In August 2010 York Regional Police reported to Whitchurch–Stouffville Town Council that the crime rate in the region was down 7% making it "one of Canada's safest communities."

Historic downtown Stouffville offers casual eateries, cafes, pubs, fine dining restaurants, and a variety of boutique stores. Urban Stouffville also has a large-scale format, unenclosed shopping centre anchored by Walmart and Canadian Tire. Stouffville has no regular cinema, but Canadian and international films are shown on the second Wednesday of every month at the Lebovic Centre for Arts & Entertainment – Nineteen on the Park (built in 1896 as market and concert hall, converted as cinema in 1923 and became Stouffville Town Hall after 1959 and converted in 2009 as arts venue).

Outside of urban Stouffville, the town operates community centres in the hamlets of Ballantrae, Lemonville, and Vandorf.

== Education ==
The first schoolhouse in Stouffville was on Church St., just north of Main St., where the United Church building stands. In 1865, the schoolhouse was purchased by the Methodist congregation and moved across the street; the building still exists as a two-family dwelling. Today Whitchurch–Stouffville is home to several public, Catholic, and private educational institutions.

The York Region District School Board has one public secondary institution in Whitchurch–Stouffville--Stouffville District Secondary School—and nine public elementary institutions: Ballantrae Public School, Glad Park Public School, Summitview Public School, Whitchurch Highlands Public School, Harry Bowes Public School, Oscar Peterson Public School, Wendat Village Public School, Spring Lakes Public School (a French Immersion school) and Barbara Reid Public School.

The York Catholic District School Board has three Catholic elementary institutions in Whitchurch–Stouffville: Saint Mark's Catholic Elementary (1965), Saint Brigid Catholic Elementary, and Saint Brendan Catholic Elementary (2012). A Kindergarten to Grade 12 Catholic French school opened in 2015. Catholic school students graduating from Grade 8 are either bused to Brother André Catholic High School in Markham, or transfer to the public system and attend Stouffville District Secondary School.

Stouffville also has five private schools: the Progressive Montessori Academy, Stouffville Christian School, Maxfield Academy, Mindtech Montessori School, and Willowgrove Primary School. In 2009, there were 38 licensed child care centres registered in York, but none were located in Whitchurch–Stouffville; eight child care facilities in Whitchurch–Stouffville have subsidized spaces, and four do not.

As the town expands into its Phase 3 Lands (post-2015), new facilities are being planned to accommodate the increasing number of school-aged children in the community.

In some areas of Stouffville, up to 50% of the children are bilingual.

Both the proportion of youth participating in higher education, as well as the proportion of adults in Whitchurch–Stouffville who have completed a university program is growing annually and far exceeds the national average; 31% of adults between 25 and 64 years of age have university training; 70% have some form of post-secondary training. However, there are no post-secondary education campuses located in Whitchurch–Stouffville. In 1877, the village of Stouffville established a Mechanics' Institute, which later became the Whitchurch-Stouffville Public Library. Emmanuel Bible College in Kitchener, Ontario had its beginnings in Stouffville in 1940. In 1991 the town came close to securing an agreement with Seneca College to open a new campus in Stouffville. In 2010, the Markham Stouffville Hospital (located in Markham) became a teaching site for residents practicing family medicine at the University of Toronto Faculty of Medicine.

== Economy ==
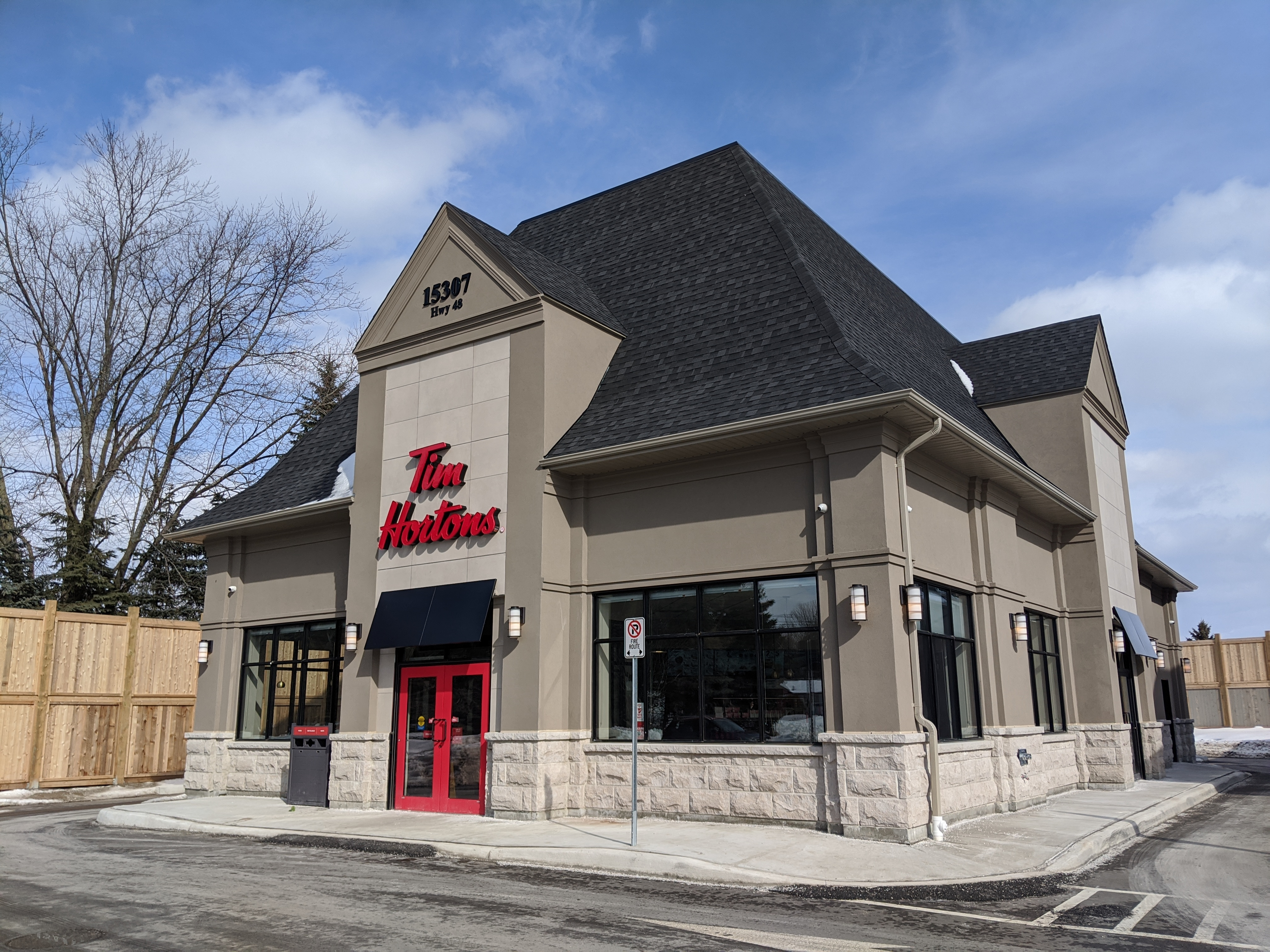
Tim Hortons at Highway 48 and Aurora Road

Stouffville's economy prior to 1900 flourished because of the coming of the railway in 1871, and because of the town's location on the juncture of the Markham-Uxbridge Road and the Town Line.

=== Employment ===
In 2013, Whitchurch–Stouffville had an estimated 11,249 jobs (excluding home- and farm-based businesses), 58.5% of which were full-time, 23.7% part-time, and the rest seasonal. While the manufacturing sector represented the largest number of local jobs in 2001, the actual numbers stagnated over the next decade between 1,300 and 1,600 jobs. By 2012, only 12% of local jobs were in the manufacturing sector (1,351), compared to 39% of jobs (or 4,419) in the retail and personal services sector.

While the number of businesses in Whitchurch–Stouffville dropped from 750 in 2009 to 690 in 2013, the total number of local jobs went from 10,300 to 13,700.

The majority of employed Whitchurch–Stouffville residents commute to Toronto and its environs for employment; in 2011 the median commuting time was 30 minutes. In the same year, the unemployment rate for Whitchurch–Stouffville was 6.3% (up from 4.8% in 2006), but below the Ontario average of 8.3%.

Industries of employment, from the 2011 National Household Survey
Industry	People employed
Agriculture and other resource-based industries	325
Construction	1,880
Manufacturing	1,400
Wholesale trade	1,510
Retail trade	2,225
Finance, insurance, real estate	2,210
Health and social services	1,405
Educational services	1,765
Professional, scientific, technical	1,925

The top private sector employers in Whitchurch–Stouffville in 2009 were:

- Teva Canada, pharmaceutical manufacturing: 310 employees
- Parkview Services for Seniors, 250 employees
- Strategic Information Technology, computer and communications equipment and supplies: 160 employees
- K-Line Group, electrical power generation: 120 employees
- Ontario SPCA, 120 employees
- Hanson, concrete pipe manufacturing: 105 employees
- King Cole Ducks Processing: 100 employees
- Stock Transportation Ltd., school and employee bus transportation
- Tam-Kal, sheet-metal manufacturing for HVAC industry
- Walmart Supercentre

Whitchurch–Stouffville is York Region's largest "mineral aggregate resource area;" these gravel sites and designated resource areas are located north and south of Bloomington Road, and all lie within the boundaries of the Oak Ridges Moraine. Under the Oak Ridges Moraine Conservation Act (2001), future aggregate resource operations must meet stringent review and approval standards.

In 2001, 20,406 acres (8,258 hectares) of land in Whitchurch–Stouffville was dedicated to farming; 45% of the farms were between 10 and 69 acres (280,000 m^{2}) in size; 25% focused on "other animal production," (792 horses and ponies on 50 farms) and 24% in greenhouse, nursery and floriculture production. Gross farm receipts for 2000 were $27,182,691; gross forestry receipts (once the backbone of Whitchurch Township's wealth) were $59,098.

Since 2009, the town's economic development strategy has focused on small and large knowledge-based industries, agricultural and environmental services, and not-for-profit organizations. Whitchurch–Stouffville is home to two internationally respected, church-based non-governmental service organizations: Emmanuel International Canada, EMAS Canada and Christian Blind Mission – Canada (CBM), all located on Stouffville Road near Kennedy Avenue.

=== Household income and housing ===
By 2013, the town had 14,334 residential units, and projected the building of 6,525 new residential units between 2013 and 2021—and a further 1,969 units by 2031—in order to accommodate a net population increase of 17,408 new residents by 2031.

In 2013 the median value of dwellings in Whitchurch–Stouffville was $471,000, 79% higher than the provincial median of $263,500, and the town's estimated average household income was $141,885; the Ontario average was $96,1300.

Only 8.8% of the private dwellings in Whitchurch–Stouffville were apartments (including duplexes) in 2011, down from 15.2% in 2006, and significantly below the provincial average was 30%. In 2009, the ratio of owned dwellings to rented dwellings in Whitchurch–Stouffville was almost 6 to 1, compared to provincial average of 2.5 to 1. In 2011, 30 per cent of renters in Whitchurch–Stouffville spent more than half their income on shelter costs, the highest in the province.

Because of the high cost of housing in Whitchurch–Stouffville relative to the provincial average, 36% of Whitchurch–Stouffville businesses said in 2012 that the community was poorly positioned to attract new immigrant employees, and 45% said the same for retaining and attracting employees under 30 years of age. Nonetheless, in 2012 Stouffville residents protested zoning designations in the Town's Official Plan which called for apartments near their own neighbourhoods.

Whitchurch–Stouffville has 51 units of public social housing and 124 not-for-profit units for the elderly (including a long-term care facility).

Social services in Whitchurch–Stouffville include the Whitchurch–Stouffville Food Bank and the Care and Share Thrift Store (Mennonite Central Committee), both located on Ringwood Drive in the Community of Stouffville. The YMCA also operates an employment resource centre in Stouffville.

== Sports ==
The first organized sport in Stouffville was curling in 1890 on the Mill Pond (today, the site of the Latcham Art Gallery and the Mennonite Care and Share Thrift Store). Lacrosse was also played at this time, and in 1897, Stouffville won the Ontario championships. The first hockey team was organized about 1900, and at the turn of the century the Stouffville rink below Burkholder Street was considered "the largest and best arranged rink in Canada." Lawnbowling has also been played in Stouffville since the early 1900s as well as organized men's and women's baseball.

The most important recreational facilities in Whitchurch–Stouffville are Soccer City, a 55,775 square feet indoor soccer complex (completed 2013); the Stouffville Clippers Sports Complex, with two NHL size ice pads (completed 2010); the Stouffville Arena, with two ice pads; the Whitchurch-Stouffville Leisure Centre, with a 25-meter pool, hot tub, gym and fitness centre, and Bethesda Park, with two ball diamonds, a senior soccer pitch and four mini sports fields (completed 2010).

Whitchurch–Stouffville is home to many golf courses, including Emerald Hills, Rolling Hills, Spring Lakes, Maples of Ballantrae, Ballantrae Golf & Country Club, St. Andrews East Golf & Country Club, Timber Creek Mini Golf & Family Fun Centre, Sleepy Hollow, Meadowbrook and Station Creek.

=== Organized sports ===
The Town has a Junior "A" ice hockey team, the Stouffville Spirit. The Stouffville Amateur Hockey League (men's and women's leagues), the Stouffville-Markham Girls Hockey Association, Whitchurch–Stouffville Minor Hockey Association, the Whitchurch–Stouffville Skating Club, and the Stouffville Adult Skating Club offer programs in the town's arenas.

The Whitchurch–Stouffville Soccer Club was established in 1977 and had 1,250 members in 2010. The club uses fields at Bethesda Park, the Stouffville Arena, Bruce's Mill Conservation Area, fields owned by Teva Canada, and the Soccer City indoor facility.

The Whitchurch–Stouffville Softball Association is a volunteer-run house-league organization. The association uses eleven ball diamonds in town plus five in the neighbouring villages of Goodwood and Claremont.

=== Recreational trails and water recreation ===
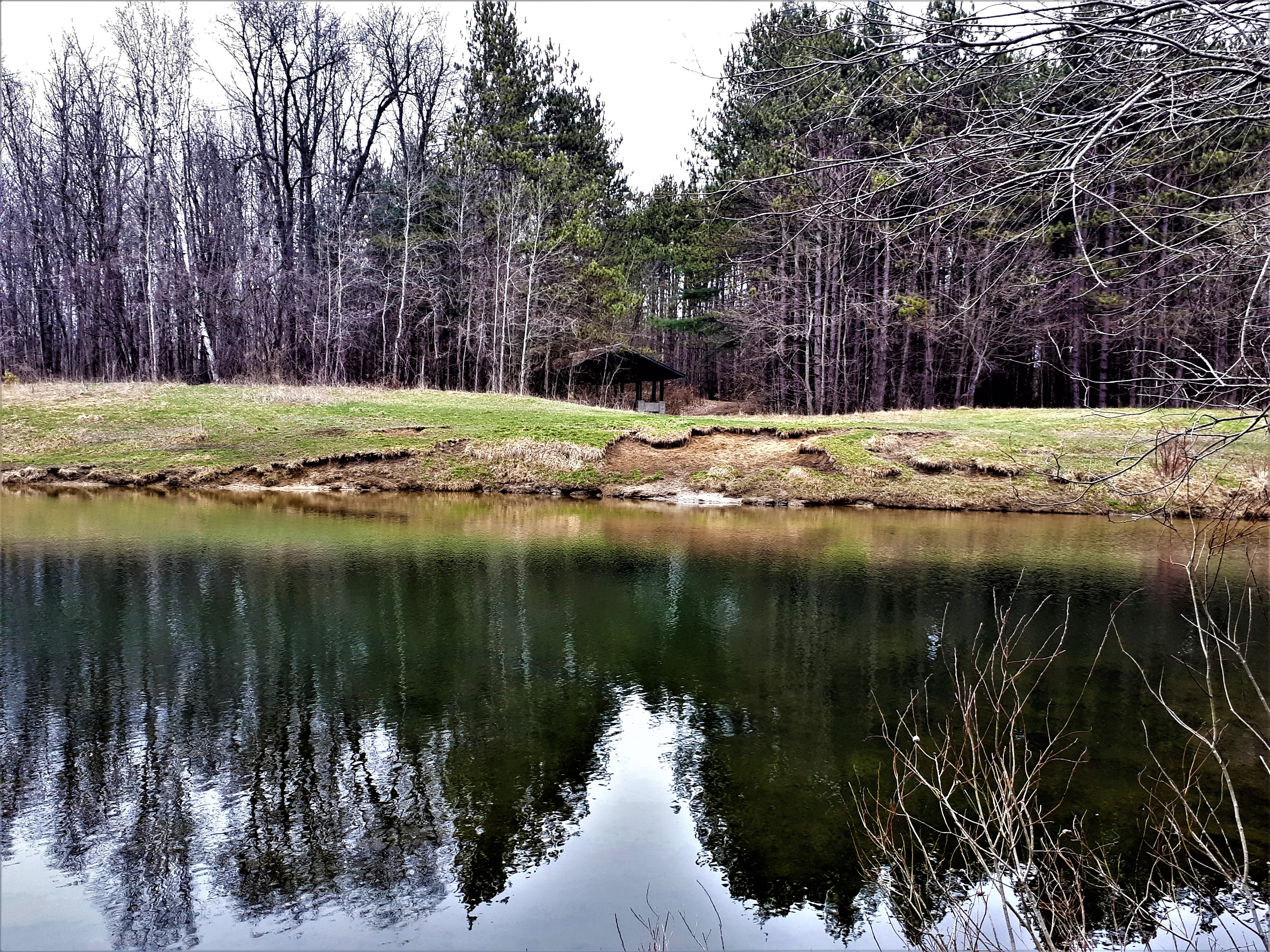
Whitchurch Conservation Area

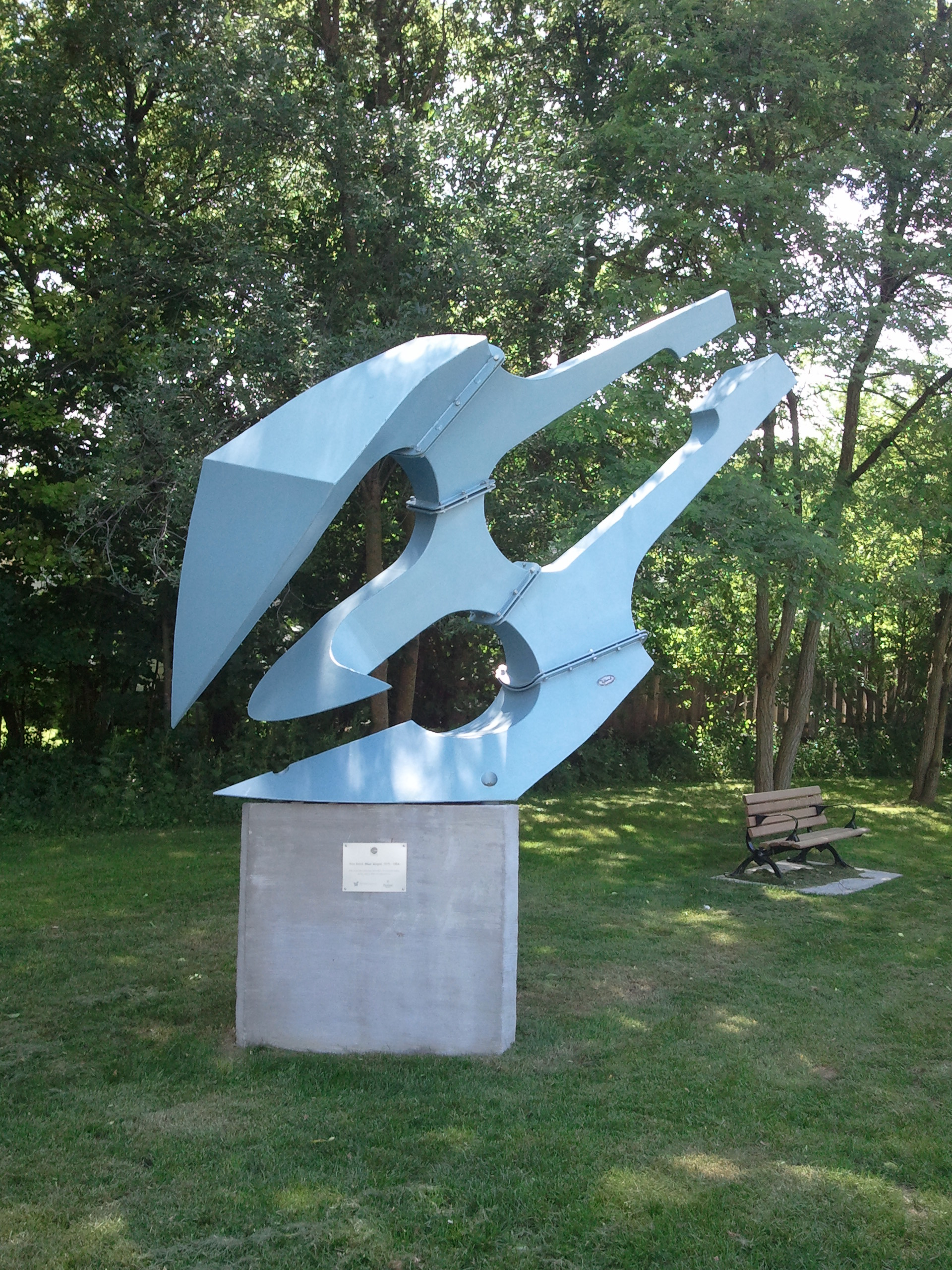
"Blue Angel" sculpture, Stouffville Creek Trail, Stouffville, Ontario

1,142 hectares of the twenty York Regional Forest tracts (or slightly more than half of the total) are found within the borders of Whitchurch–Stouffville.

The Whitchurch Conservation Area covers ten hectares, and is accessed on Aurora Sideroad, three kilometres east of Woodbine Ave. It is connected to a larger York Region Forest Tract and to trails of the Oak Ridges Trail Association.

The Pangman Springs Conservation Area is accessed from Kennedy Road between Davis Drive and Aurora Road or from the Porritt tract of the York Region Forest using an Oak Ridges Trail Association side trail.

Bruce's Mill Conservation Area in Whitchurch–Stouffville is the northern gateway to Rouge Park. The Master Plan for the conservation area includes not only a trail system within the park, but also future trail connections to inter-regional trails.

An extensive trail system within urban Stouffville is being developed that connects to the larger forested areas of the Whitchurch–Stouffville. The most significant trail begins in town along the Stouffville Creek and leads through a mature forest around the Stouffville Reservoir. In 2012, Whitchurch–Stouffville had 32 kilometers of trails.

Whitchurch–Stouffville is also home to a number of kettle lakes which are ideal for outdoor water recreation. While these glacier-formed lakes are crown property, and the resources of all levels of government are used for their regulation, protection and preservation, the actual perimeter of the lakes are in private hands (kettle lakes are not fed by creeks or rivers) and therefore only homeowners in the sub-communities have access rights to Whitchurch–Stouffville's lakes. Access to Musselman's Lake via Cedar Beach Trailer Park was lost in 2012, while access to Preston Lake was lost when Landford Development purchased the west-shore beach and trailer park and built estate properties with a shared private beach. In 2008 the town's development plans included a trail system with access to Preston Lake, but this was met with opposition from Preston Lake residents who desired to protect their exclusive access. Interest and support for the purchase or expropriation of land for public access to the town's most important natural and recreational assets has grown with the town's development.

The Town of Whitchurch–Stouffville operated an outdoor public swimming pool until 2010 when it was closed due to disrepair.

== Arts, culture and media ==
In 2006, the town of Whitchurch–Stouffville developed and adopted "municipal cultural policy" as a framework for planning and delivering cultural services. Whitchurch–Stouffville's investment in the arts has been slow, and consequently residents have not only fallen below the national average on exposure to the performing arts, museums and galleries, but the average exposure has decreased from 2006 to 2010.

=== Arts and entertainment centre ===
Whitchurch–Stouffville's deficit in the performing arts has been addressed in part by the recent rehabilitation of the former Stouffville Town Hall (constructed in 1896), a redevelopment that created a multifaceted arts, culture and entertainment centre in downtown Stouffville; the Lebovic Centre for Arts & Entertainment – Nineteen on the Park opened its doors to the public in May 2009.

=== Art gallery and visual art ===
Latcham Art Centre (formerly the Latcham Gallery) is a public art gallery established in 1979, by a group of local artists and supporters who saw the need for an arts facility in Whitchurch–Stouffville. The art centre was named after Arthur Latcham, a local philanthropist who donated money for the building on 6240 Main Street that housed the art centre from 1979-2018. Latcham Art Centre hosts 5-6 curated exhibitions a year featuring contemporary work by provincial artists and three community exhibitions, including an annual juried exhibition, an exhibition of work by a local graduating high school art class, and an exhibition of work by students from local elementary schools. Along with exhibitions, Latcham Art Centre provides educational and public programs including school visits, public lectures, art workshops and classes, and tours led by the curator, art educators and exhibiting artists. Admission to Latcham Art Centre is free. The art centre is a member of the Ontario Association of Art Galleries and its operations are supported by the Town of Whitchurch–Stouffville and the Ontario Arts Council. In August 2018, Latcham Art Centre moved from 6240 Main Street to the Whitchurch-Stouffville Leisure Centre, changing its name from The Latcham Gallery to Latcham Art Centre.

Since 2000, artists in Whitchurch–Stouffville have organized the Whitchurch-Stouffville Studio Tour, featuring more than two dozen artists in several venues across Whitchurch–Stouffville. The Studio Tour takes place the weekend after Thanksgiving each year. In 2008, the Ttur was nominated for "The Premier's award for excellence in art."

=== Library ===
Whitchurch-Stouffville Public Library and Leisure Centre, 2010

The Whitchurch-Stouffville Public Library is located in the Whitchurch-Stouffvile Leisure Centre (constructed in 2001), a facility occupied jointly by the department of Leisure Services and the library. The population served by the library doubled between 2005 and 2013, and circulation increased 109%. Library expenditures dropped from 5.1% of town operating expenses in 2004 to 3.0% in 2007, and 2.7% in the 2014 budget. In 2014, Whitchurch–Stouffville's per capita library costs were $26, the lowest of twenty-four Ontario towns in its population category (median $42). In 2010, the Maclean's "Third Annual Smart Cities Rankings" showed that for residents in Whitchurch–Stouffville, "exposure to reading" had declined annually from 2006 to 2010, and fell significantly below the national average. A library expansion was first projected for 2009. In June 2011 local book clubs and individuals began a grass-roots campaign to petition for greater municipal funding for the public library. In 2012, the Town commissioned a study of the library's current and future space needs. A 2014 expansion design was rejected by the newly elected Town Council in 2015, and the minimum space requirements for a community library were vigorously challenged.

=== Festivals and fairs ===
The Stouffville Strawberry Festival is a traditional community fair on the Canada Day weekend, which celebrates Stouffville's agricultural heritage.

The annual Stouffville Country Ribfest is held by the Town of Whitchurch-Stouffville every August in Memorial Park and is the largest event of the year. This event features ribbers, merchants, food vendors, a midway and more and attracts over 40 000 visitors a year. The Town also holds various other events including (but not limited to) Victoria Day Fireworks, Symphony Under the Stars and the Stouffville Santa Claus Parade.

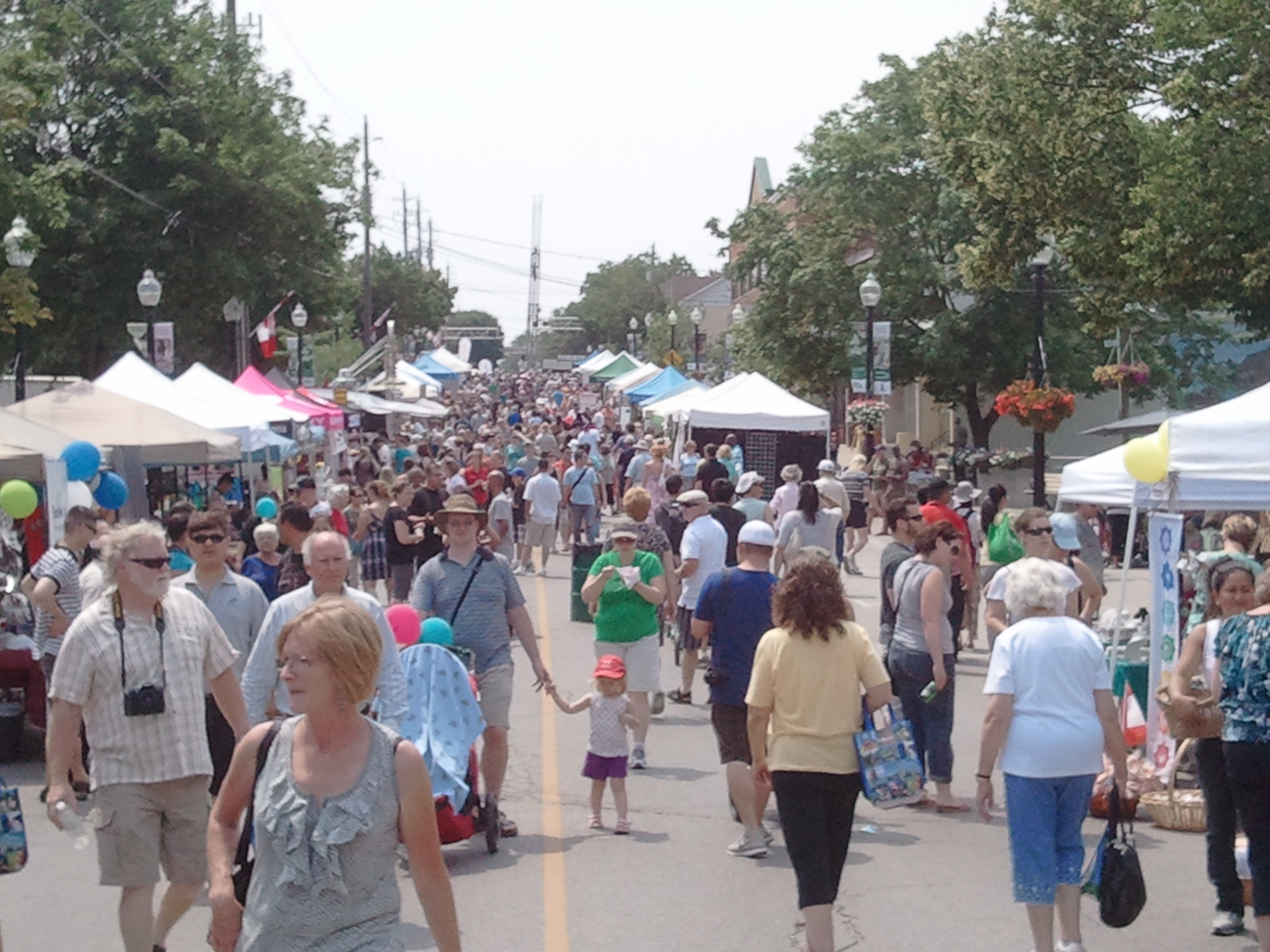
Stouffville Strawberry Festival, 2011

The Markham Fair is hosted by the Markham and East York Agricultural Society, and supported by both the City of Markham and the Town of Whitchurch–Stouffville (Stouffville south of Main Street was part of Markham Township prior to 1971). The Markham Fair dates back to 1844 and is one of Canada's oldest and largest fairs, hosting upwards of 80,000 visitors. The fair is held on the weekend before Thanksgiving. It is held at the Markham fairgrounds, directly south of the Stouffville town border.

Bruce's Mill Conservation Area hosts an annual Sugarbush Maple Syrup Festival over four weeks in March and April.

In February the Musselman Lake community hosts an annual Winter Carnival at Cedar Beach.

York Region's Spring Forest Festival is held annually during Earth Week (April) in the York Regional Forest, Eldred King Tract, Highway 48 (just south of Vivian Road).

The annual Wine and Food Festival (June) is organized by the Ballantrae Golf and Country Club.

On the third Saturday of September, Stouffville's Willowgrove Farm hosts the annual GTA Toronto Mennonite Festival and Quilt Auction.

=== Museum ===
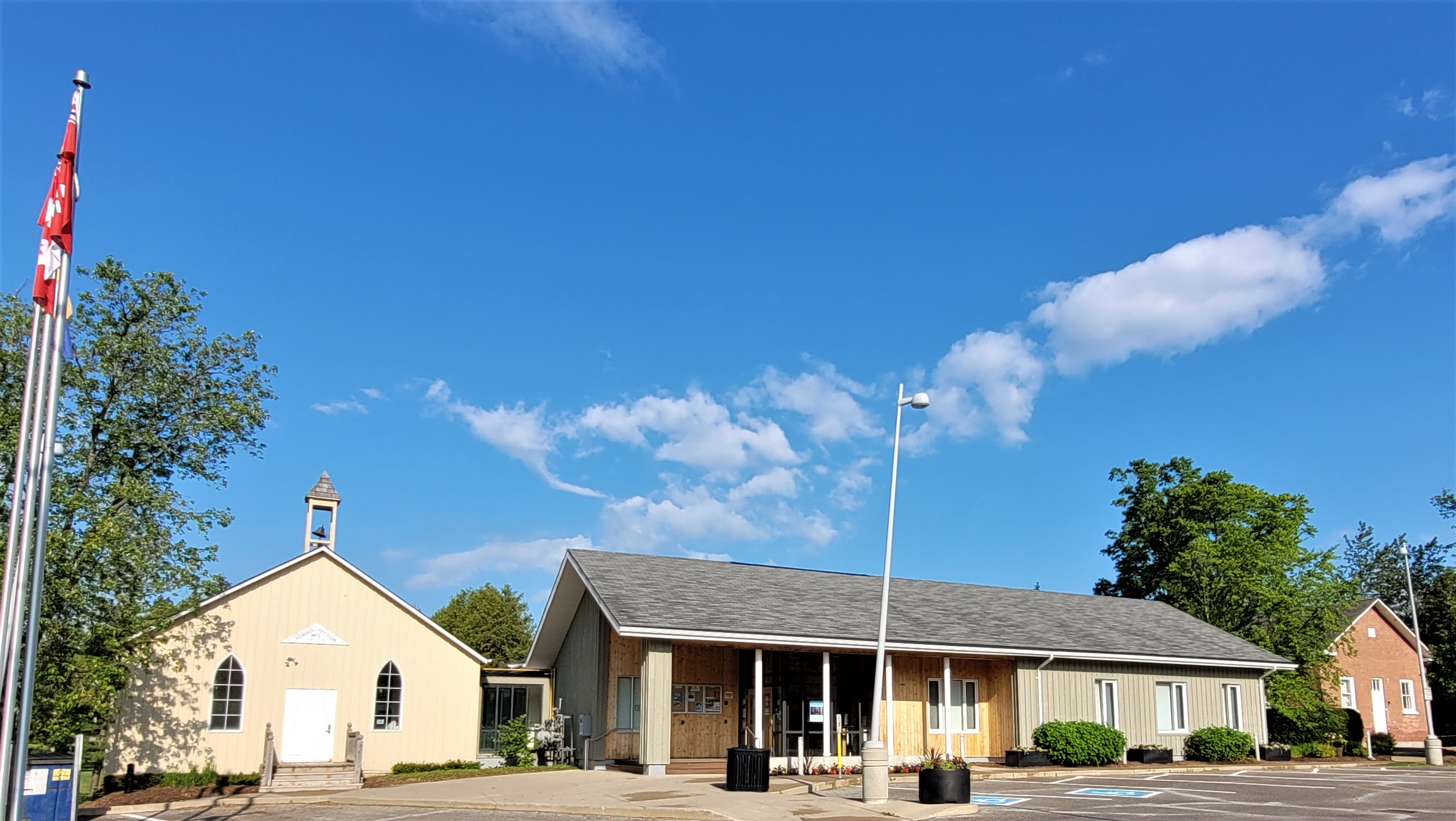
Whitchurch-Stouffville Museum and Community Centre

The idea for the Whitchurch–Stouffville Museum began in 1969 as a civic-minded project by a group of local residents. After opening in 1971 in the hamlet of Vandorf the site has grown over the years from the original museum building. The museum site includes five historic structures from the former Township of Whitchurch: the Bogarttown Schoolhouse (1857), a pioneer log cabin (c. 1850), a Victorian Farmhouse built by James Brown (1857), a barn (c. 1830) and Vandorf Public School (1870). In 2012, the Whitchurch–Stouffville Museum added a Community Centre that blended the old with the new by joining the two schoolhouses. The new facility includes a Research Room, Exhibition Gallery, Discovery Room, and two rental spaces.

=== Media ===
The town is currently served by two local community newspapers: the Stouffville Free Press and the Stouffville Sun-Tribune. SNAP Stouffville/Uxbridge is a print publication which specializes in a photographic view of life in the community. Stouffville Connects is an online publication focussed on community contributed journalism. A community radio station, WhiStle Radio (CIWS-FM), was launched in 2008.

=== Film and television ===
Movies partially shot on location in the community of Stouffville include The Russell Girl (2008), Stir of Echoes: The Homecoming (2007), Who Killed Atlanta's Children? (2000), On Hostile Ground (2000), Strike! (1998), The Sweet Hereafter (1997), Bad Day on the Block (1997), Martin's Day (1984), and The Dead Zone (1983). Television shows shot in Stouffville include episodes from Warehouse 13 (2010), The West Wing, Degrassi: The Next Generation, Nikita, Schitt's Creek (2015), and Curse of the Axe (documentary film on the Wendat-Huron village site discovered in Stouffville).

Films and television series shot at Shadow Lake Centre in Whitchurch–Stouffville (Musselman Lake) include 1-800-Missing, Tarzan & Jane (2002), The Crossing (2000), Run the Wild Fields, Ice Men (2005), Top Cops, The Loretta Claiborne Story, True Romance (1993), Ready or Not, The White Dog Sacrifice, and The Littlest Hobo (Summitview Public School).

== Attractions ==
- Bruce's Mill Conservation Area, the northern gateway to Rouge Park with trails, and Community Safety Village
- Downtown Stouffville Farmers' Market (Thursdays, May–October)
- Latcham Gallery
- Oak Ridges Trail and York Demonstration Forest
- RHLS Narrow Gauge Railway
- Ringwood Fish Culture Station
- Whitchurch–Stouffville Museum
- York-Durham Heritage Railway

== Notable people ==
- Keith Acton – National Hockey League player and Stanley Cup winner, current owner of the local Boston Pizza franchise
- John W. Bowser – construction superintendent of the Empire State Building and Royal Ontario Museum
- Roy Brown – Royal Air Force officer and World War I flying ace, credited with downing the Red Baron (Manfred von Richthofen)
- Karen Cockburn – Olympic medalist (trampoline gymnast)
- Earl Cook – Major League Baseball player (Detroit Tigers)
- Michael Del Zotto – National Hockey League player
- Nicole Dollanganger – singer/songwriter
- Mike Harris – Olympic medalist (curler)
- Bob Hassard – National Hockey League player and Stanley Cup winner
- Liz Knox – Canadian Women's Hockey League player; Professional Women's Hockey Players Association founding board member and player
- H.R. MacMillan – forester, forestry industrialist, wartime administrator, and philanthropist
- Jeff Marek – hockey analyst for Sportsnet
- Brad May – National Hockey League player
- Jason "Human Kebab" Parsons – member of band Ubiquitous Synergy Seeker
- Sean Pierson – professional mixed martial arts fighter
- B. W. Powe – author
- Raffi Torres – National Hockey League player
- Frank Underhill – founder of the Co-operative Commonwealth Federation (CCF) Party; co-writer of the Regina Manifesto (1933) and Officer of the Order of Canada
- Jim Veltman – National Lacrosse League Hall of Fame player
- Ethan Werek – professional ice hockey player
- Dean Michael Wiwchar – contract killer

== Sister city ==
- Igoma, Tanzania (Stouffville-Igoma Partnership).

== See also ==
- List of archaeological sites in Whitchurch–Stouffville
- List of townships in Ontario
