= Pleasantville =

Pleasantville may refer to:

== Places ==
=== Canada ===
- Pleasantville, Ontario
- Pleasantville, a defunct community located inside the modern boundaries of Newmarket, Ontario
- Pleasantville, St. John's, Newfoundland and Labrador
- Pleasantville (electoral district) - former electoral district in Newfoundland

=== United States ===
- Pleasantville, Delaware
- Pleasantville, Indiana
- Pleasantville, Iowa
- Pleasantville, New Jersey
- Pleasantville, New York
  - Pleasantville station
- Pleasantville, Ohio
- Pleasantville, Pennsylvania
  - Pleasantville, Bedford County, Pennsylvania
  - Pleasantville, Berks County, Pennsylvania
  - Pleasantville, Bucks County, Pennsylvania
  - Pleasantville, Venango County, Pennsylvania
- Pleasantville, Tennessee
- Pleasantville, Houston, a neighborhood located in Houston, Texas
- Pleasantville, Wisconsin

== Other ==
- Pleasantville, a 1976 film with cinematography by Walter Lassally
- Pleasantville (film), a 1998 fantasy comedy-drama film
- Pleasantville (novel), a 2015 mystery thriller novel
- Pleasantville, the fictional town and setting for the TV series Big Wolf on Campus
