= Bloomington, Whitchurch-Stouffville =

Bloomington
- Unincorporated community
- Interactive map of Bloomington
- Coordinates: 44°0′24″N 79°15′51″W
- Country: Canada
- Province: Ontario
- Regional municipality: York Region
- Town: Whitchurch–Stouffville
- Amalgamation: (with Town of Stouffville); 1 January 1971
- As postal hamlet: 1869

Government
  - Type: Municipality
  - Mayor: Iain Lovatt
  - Councillor, Ward 4: Rick Upton
  - Councillor, Ward 5: Richard Bartley
- Elevation: 320 m (1,050 ft)
- Time zone: UTC−5 (EST)
  - Summer (DST): UTC−4 (EDT)
- Forward sortation area: L4A
- Area codes: 905 and 289

Bloomington is a hamlet in York Region, Ontario, Canada, in the town of Whitchurch-Stouffville. The hamlet is centred at the intersection of Ninth Line and Bloomington Road near the eastern boundary of the town of Whitchurch–Stouffville. Neighbouring communities within Whitchurch–Stouffville include Musselman Lake to the north, Lemonville to the west, and the community of urban Stouffville to the south. The hamlet of Goodwood in the town of Uxbridge lies to the east.

== History ==
The first settlers arrived in the early 19th century, and were largely Quakers, Mennonites and United Empire Loyalists who had left the United States. The first postmaster, Samuel Patterson, registered the name Bloomington in 1869, likely after the city of Bloomington, Illinois.

There are a few reminders of the old hamlet that remain:

- Bloomington Schoolhouse, located at 13681 Ninth Line, was built in 1898 as School Section No. 10 (with an addition from 1952). It closed before 1971, and is now a private residence.
- Bloomington Cove Care Community is located on Ninth Line south of Bloomington Side Road.
- Bloomington Gospel Church was built in 1874.

== Economy ==
Bloomington is primarily agricultural, but some land is being developed for housing and few commercial businesses.
