= H. R. MacMillan =

Canadian industrialist (1885–1976)

- Born: 9 September 1885; Pine Orchard, Ontario
- Died: 9 February 1976 (aged 90); Vancouver, British Columbia
- Education: Ontario Agricultural College (BSc 1906); Yale University (MSc 1908)
- Spouse: Edna Mulloy (m. 1911)

Harvey Reginald MacMillan CC CBE (9 September 1885 – 9 February 1976) was a Canadian forester, forestry industrialist, wartime administrator, and philanthropist.

Born in Pine Orchard, Whitchurch Township, Ontario (today part of Whitchurch–Stouffville), he attended school in Bogarttown, Sharon, and Aurora. He graduated from the Ontario Agricultural College (then part of the University of Toronto) in 1906 with an honours degree in biology. He obtained a Master of Science degree in Forestry at Yale University in 1908. In 1912, he was appointed first Chief Forester of British Columbia.

In 1919, backed by British timber merchant Montague Meyer, MacMillan established the H.R. MacMillan Export Company, Ltd.

He was Honorary Colonel of the Seaforth Highlanders of Canada from November 23, 1953, to August 7, 1957.

On 2 August 1911 at the Presbyterian Church in Aurora, MacMillan married Edna Mulloy (1883–1962). Harvey and Edna had two daughters, Edna Marion (1912–2002) and Gertrude Jean (1915–2007). In 1939 Marion married John Lecky (19??–1976). Their son John Lecky was an Olympic oarsman. In 1941 Jean married Gordon Thomas Southam (1910–1998), the son of newspaperman Harry Stevenson Southam. MacMillan died in Vancouver on 9 February 1976 at age 90.

== Legacy ==
MacMillan funded multiple of philanthropic endeavours, many of which were named in his honour. These include:

- MacMillan Provincial Park
- H. R. MacMillan Space Centre

== Bibliography ==
- Ken Drushka (1995). H.R.: A Biography of H.R. MacMillan. Harbour Publishing. ISBN 1-55017-129-1.
- Donald MacKay (1982). Empire of wood : the MacMillan Bloedel story. Douglas & McIntyre. ISBN 0888943709.

== See also ==
- Economic History of Vancouver
