= Whitchurch–Stouffville Public Library =

Library in Whitchurch–Stouffville, Ontario, Canada

Whitchurch-Stouffville Public Library
- 43°58′02″N 79°14′40″W
- Location: Whitchurch–Stouffville, Ontario, Canada
- Type: Public library
- Established: 1877
- Branches: 1

Access and use
- Circulation: 200,000
- Members: 20,000

Other information
- Director: Margaret Wallace
- Website: wsplibrary.ca

The Whitchurch–Stouffville Public Library is the public library of Whitchurch–Stouffville, Ontario, Canada, and is located in Stouffville.

== History ==
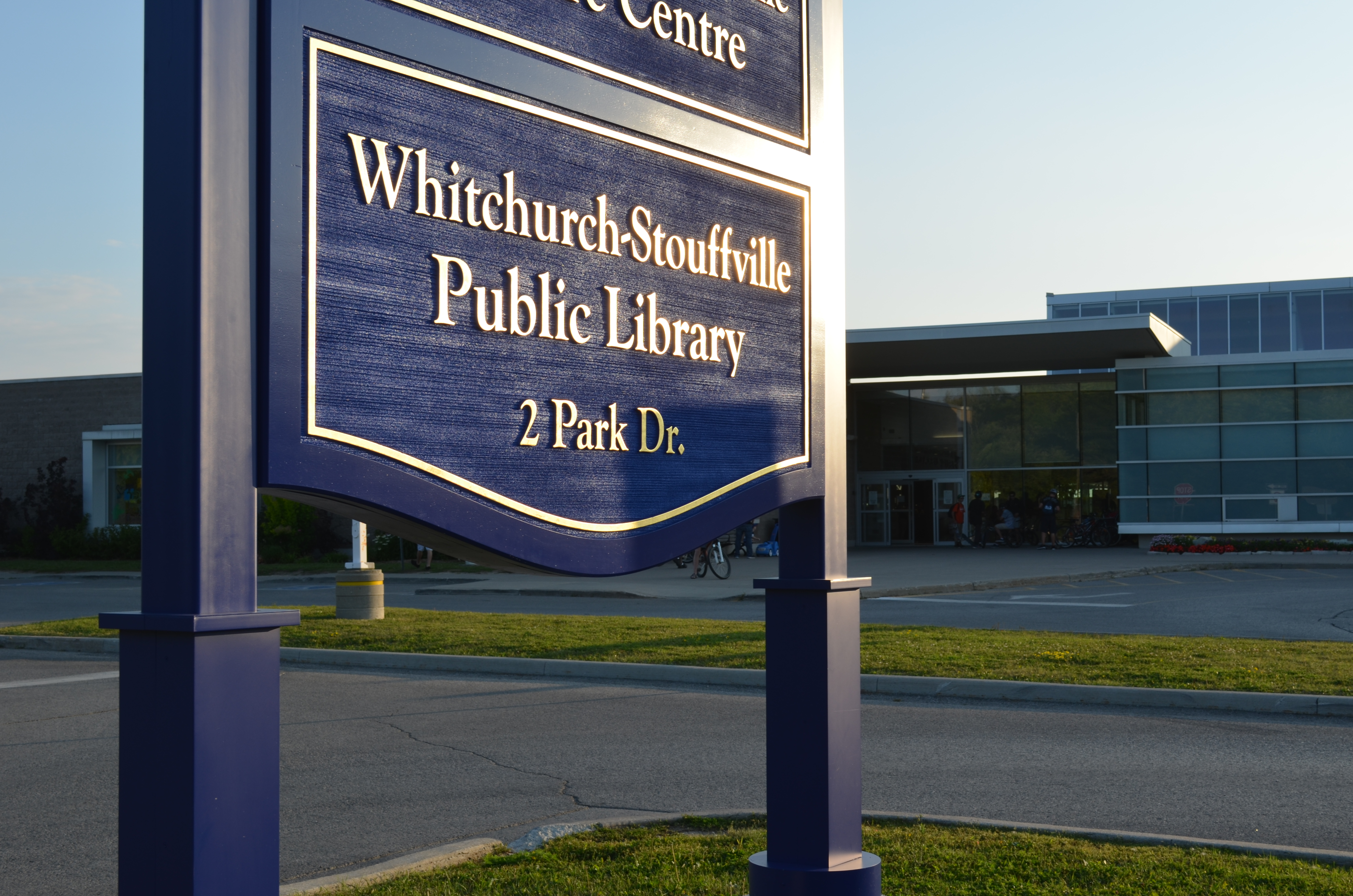
Whitchurch-Stouffville Public Library at its current location

The Whitchurch–Stouffville Public Library traces its heritage to 1877 when it was first established in Allan's Jewellery Store. A key promoter was J. Wideman, the editor of the local newspaper, the Alert. The library was known as the Mechanics' Institute, and for a time was located in the old Municipal Building (today The Lebovic Centre for Arts & Entertainment – Nineteen on the Park). It held 793 volumes in the early 1880s, 1009 volumes in 1884, and more than 2,500 in 1895.

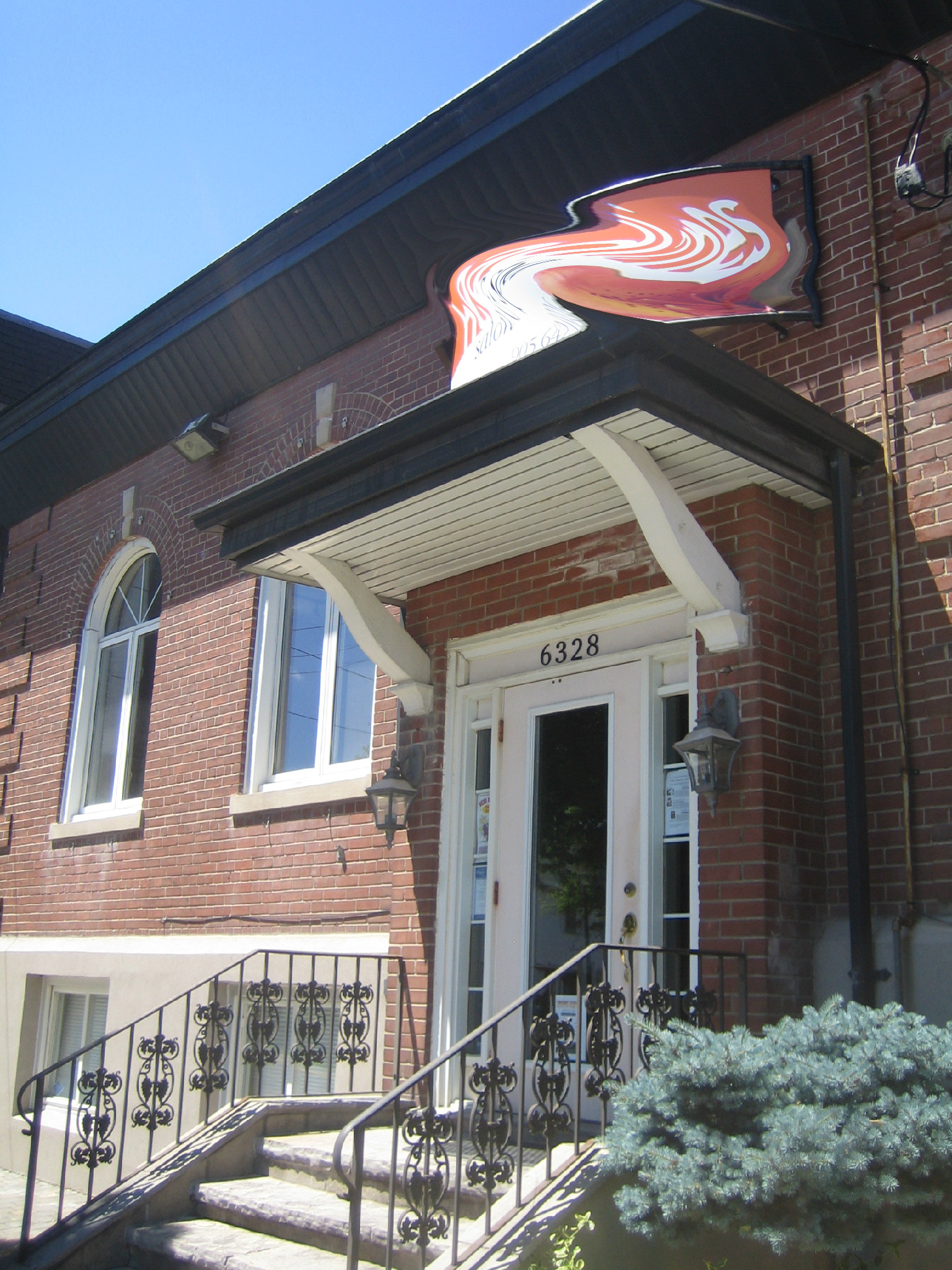
Stouffville's 1923 "Carnegie" Library

It became a free public library in 1899. The first permanent library was built in 1923 at 7 Main Street East, through a $6000 grant from the Carnegie Foundation and the generosity of many local donors. The Carnegie Library could hold between 5,000 and 7,000 volumes; in 1923 it had 5,495 volumes; in 1947, 7,246 volumes; and in 1964 approximately 5,000 volumes (the town's population in 1923 was under 2000; at amalgamation in 1971, Stouffville proper had a population of 5,036). The Library moved to a 5,000-square-foot (465 m^{2}) storefront in 1974 and then to a $360,000 new building at 6240 Main Street in 1977. The library celebrated its 100th birthday on February 17, 1999. The Whitchurch-Stouffville Leisure Centre was constructed in 2001 at 2 Park Drive, a facility now occupied jointly by the department of Leisure Services and the library.

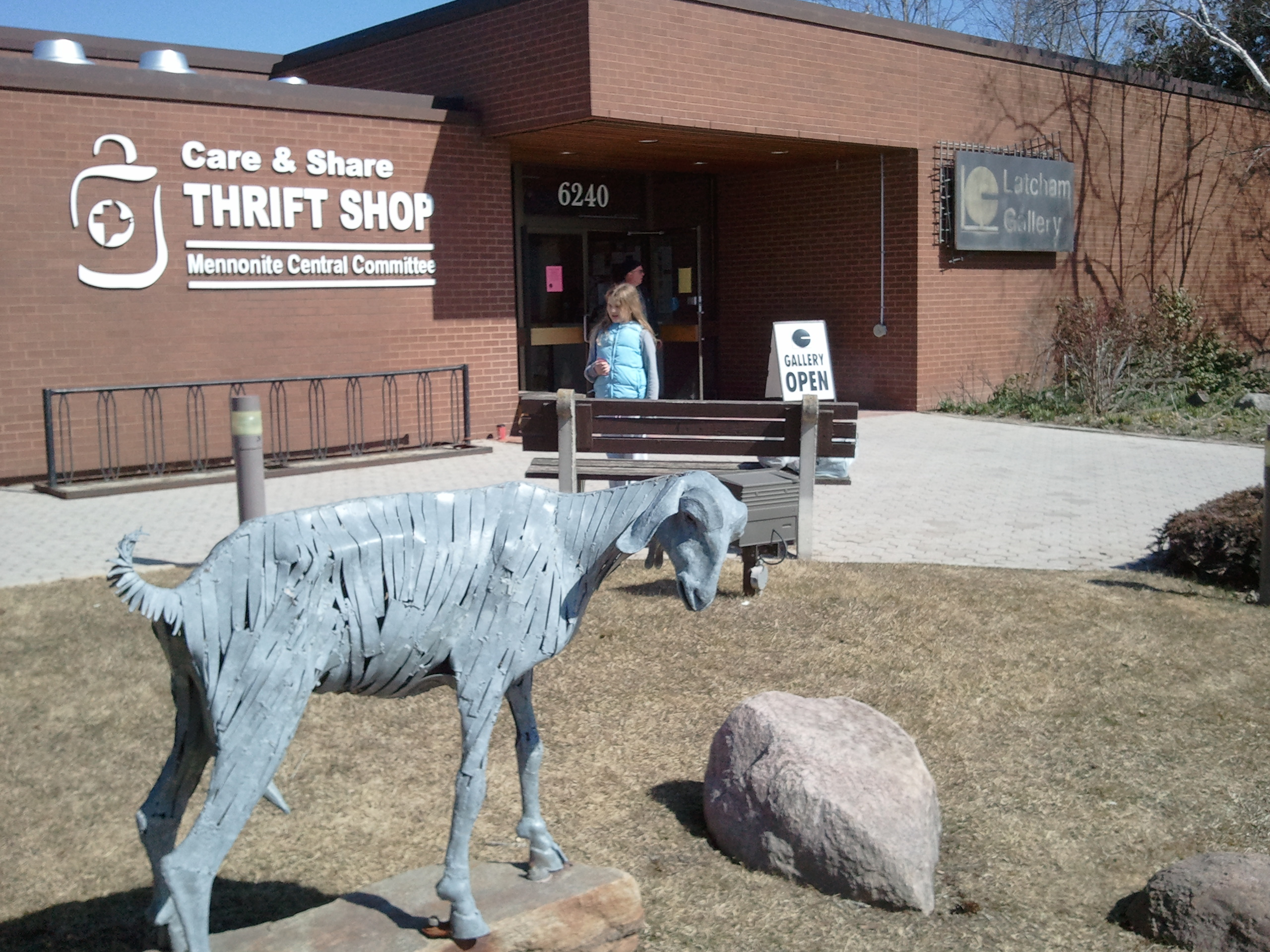
Whitchurch-Stouffville Public Library Building, 1977-2001

The population of Whitchurch-Stouffville grew 87.5% between 2006 and 2015, from 24,390 residents to approximately 45,000. Correspondingly, the library's annual circulation also increased, from 104,998 items in 2005 to 245,200 in 2014. Library funding as a percentage of the town operating budget declined from 5.1% in 2004 to 3.0% in 2007, and to 2% in 2011. Total expenditure increased from about $770,000 in 2004 to about $1,000,000 in 2011. A consultants' report on Ontario municipalities prepared in 2010 ranked Whitchurch-Stouffville ninth of eleven Ontario communities in its population category for per capita library spending (based on 2009 data). By 2011, Whitchurch-Stouffville's per capita library costs were $23, the lowest of sixteen Ontario towns in its population category (average $44). In the same year (2011), the library found it necessary to cover basic library operating costs from the proceeds from its annual community book sale.

The library will serve a projected a town population of 42,343 in 2013; 53,321 in 2021; and 62,321 in 2026. In June 2011, local book clubs and individuals began a grass-roots campaign to petition for greater municipal funding for the public library. An expansion of the library facility was planned, but continually postponed; the town's 2009 capital budget called for the design work in 2011 and the construction in 2010, the 2010 budget for design work in 2013 and construction in 2014, the 2011 budget for design in 2014 and construction in 2015.

After over a year of construction, the library expansion opened on April 16, 2018.

== Services ==
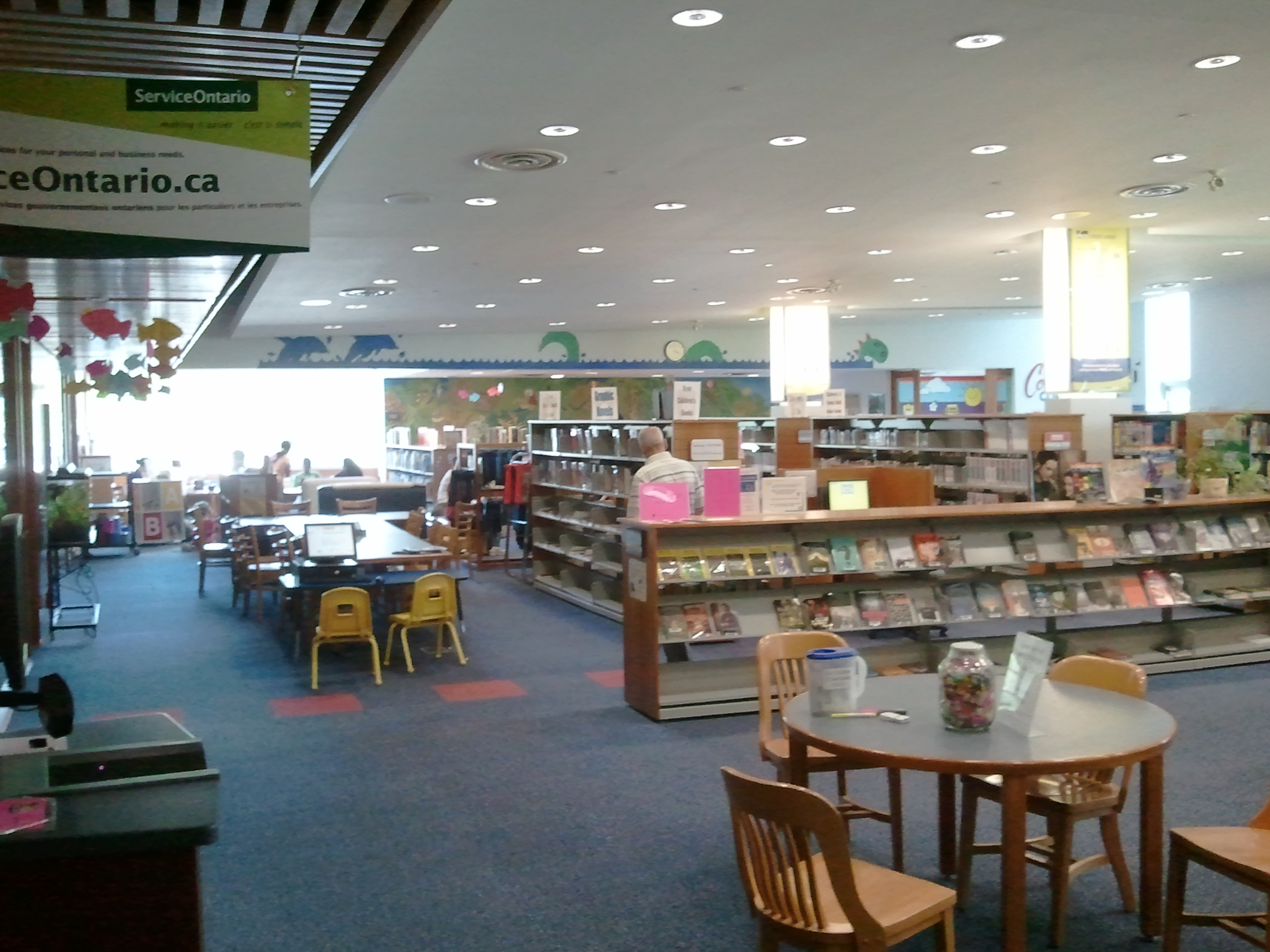
Whitchurch–Stouffville Public Library Interior

The Whitchurch–Stouffville Public Library offers library services, collections, access to technology and programs. It attracted more than 1,900 new members in 2010 and has over 20,000 active card holders. More than 57% of the community belongs to the Library. Circulation of materials was over 200,000 as of 2010, an increase of more than 12% over 2009.

=== Children's Services ===
The Library has a wide array of programs and services for children. Free programs include story times on Tuesday, Wednesday, and Saturday mornings and Monday evenings, and movies on PA days and holidays. The Library runs programs and activities throughout the week of March Break and has a summer reading program. Craft programs, phonics classes, Baby Goose, and Mother Goose on the Loose are available for a nominal fee. All children's computers are equipped with Encarta for Kids and Microsoft Office. Resources include a wide selection of books, graphic novels, talking books, compact discs, DVDs, and e-books.

=== Community Space ===
The library has a quiet magazine area for browsing periodicals or daily newspapers. There are comfortable chairs by a fireplace to encourage leisure reading and relaxation. The Library offers free wireless internet access throughout the building.

== See also ==
- Public libraries in Ontario
- List of Carnegie libraries in Canada
