= Glasgow, Ontario =

Coordinates: 43°59′40″N 79°12′15″W

Glasgow
- Unincorporated community
- Interactive map of Glasgow
- Country: Canada
- Province: Ontario
- Regional municipality: Durham Region
- Town: Pickering, Ontario
- Time zone: UTC−5 (EST)
  - Summer (DST): UTC−4 (EDT)

Glasgow is a community located in the Regional Municipality of Durham in Ontario, Canada. It is located on the edge of lands designated for a future international airport (Pickering Airport), immediately east of the community of Stouffville and north of the ghost-town of Altona. There was a Mennonite church formed in Glasgow in 1930.

== See also ==
- List of communities in Ontario
