= Ringwood, Ontario =

Ringwood
- Unincorporated community
- Location within Ontario Location within Canada
- Coordinates: 43°57′50″N 79°16′51″W
- Country: Canada
- Province: Ontario
- Regional municipality: York Region
- Town: Whitchurch–Stouffville
- Amalgamation: (With Town of Stouffville); 1 January 1971

Government
  - Type: Municipality
  - Mayor: Iain Lovatt
  - Councillor: Rick Upton (Ward 4)
- Elevation: 255 m (837 ft)
- Time zone: UTC−5 (EST)
  - Summer (DST): UTC−4 (EDT)
- Forward sortation area: L4A
- Area codes: 905 and 289

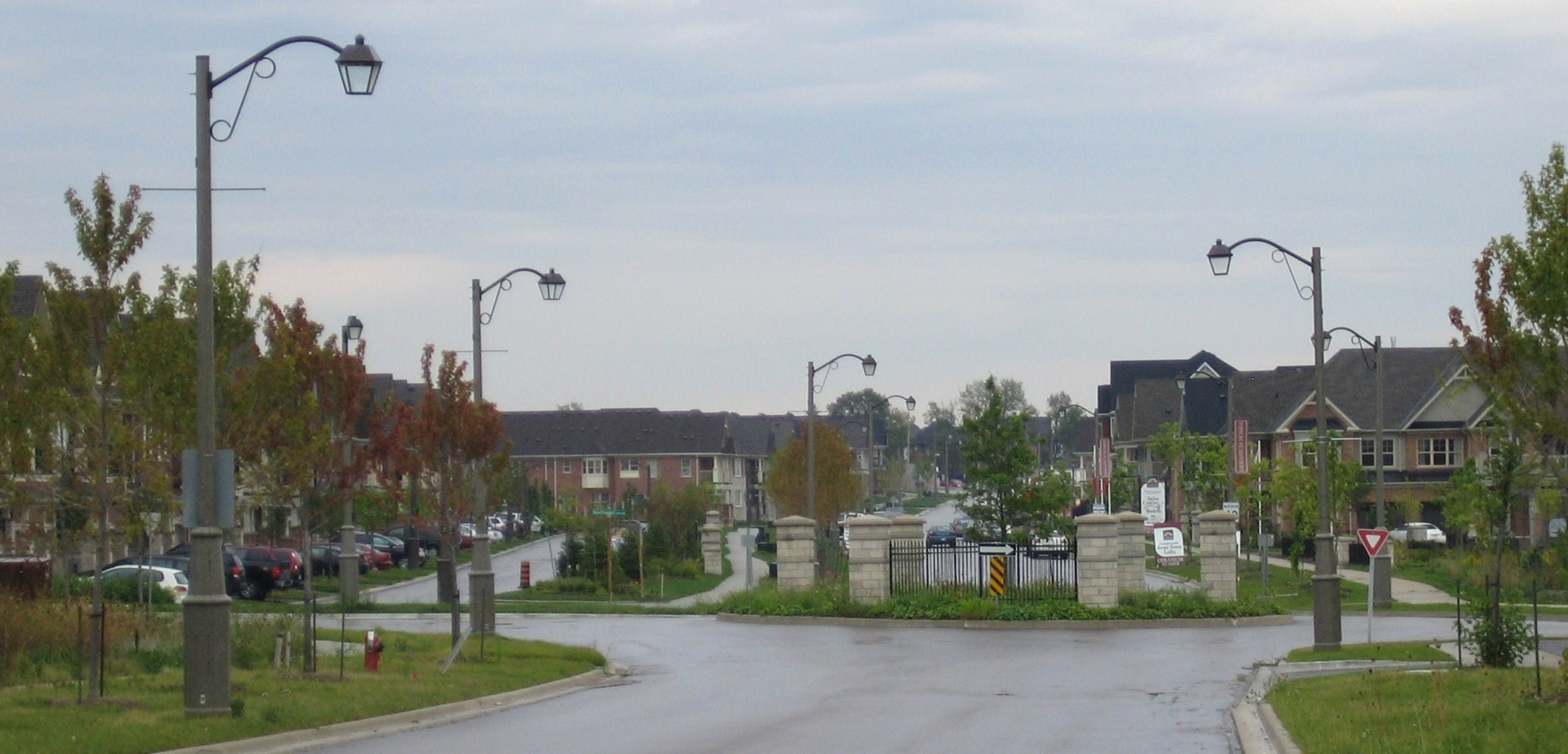
Millard St., looking east, Ringwood

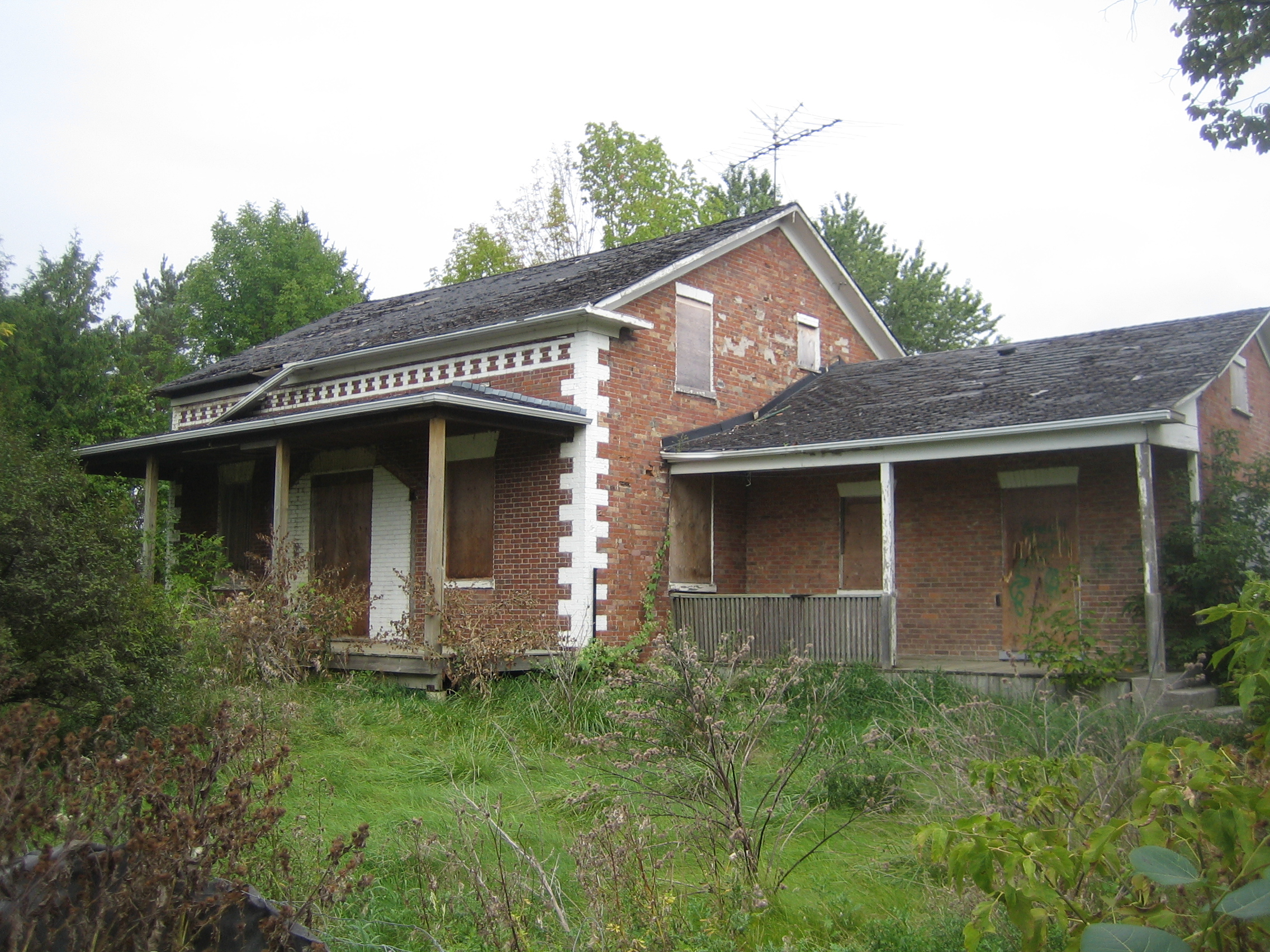
Samuel Brownsberger historic home, built 1849, Millard Street and Automall Boulevard, Stouffville (Ringwood), on the Little Rouge River (picture taken Sept. 2, 2010). Sam Brownsberger, born 1825, came from Pennsylvania to Ringwood at age one and died at age 96; he was the last of the original settlers.

1887 historic schoolhouse, Hwy. 48 (east side, north of Main St.), Ringwood

Ringwood is a hamlet in York Region, Ontario, Canada, in the Town of Whitchurch–Stouffville. The hamlet is centred at the intersection of Stouffville Road and Highway 48, on the Little Rouge River, a tributary of the Rouge River on the Oak Ridges Moraine. The community originally straddled the townships of Markham and Whitchurch in the County of York.

== History ==
The hamlet was named Ringwood in 1856 by George Sylvester, postmaster and owner of a general store, after the town of Ringwood, in Hampshire, England. It was first settled in the 1790s by George Fockler from Pennsylvania (land on northwest corner of Highway 48 and Main Street later farmed by Samuel Fockler).

In 1857, Ringwood had a population of 200, which grew only slightly to 225 by 1910. By 1972, the population had dropped to 172. Between 2008 and 2010, more than 250 homes were constructed in Ringwood's Cardinal Point subdivision north of Main Street.

Once a community distinct from Stouffville, Ringwood has long functioned as the western gateway into Stouffville.

Prior to January 1, 1971, Ringwood south of Main Street was located in Markham, Ontario with northern section located within Stouffville.

Ringwood's landmark corner-store and post office at Main Street and Highway 48, which served as the entrance to Stouffville since 1851, was expropriated and demolished by the Town of Whitchurch–Stouffville in 2008 in order to widen Main Street. Other Ringwood landmarks were demolished for the widening of Highway 48 in the 1950s. An important archaeological site in Ringwood dating back to 1500 BC was destroyed with the expansion of Spring Lakes Golf Course in 1981. Immediately north of Ringwood, an important late sixteenth or early seventeenth-century Wendat (Huron) ancestral village (the so-called Ratcliff or Baker Hill site) was discovered on the brow of a hill overlooking the tributary of the Little Rouge River which runs into Ringwood. Much of the site was destroyed by the expansion of a neighboring quarry.

In the 1830s, both Ringwood and Stouffville were centres of radical opinion. In Stouffville, reformer William Lyon Mackenzie hatched his plan for the Upper Canada Rebellion (1837–1838); the meeting was chaired by a Ringwood farmer, Ludwig Wideman, who became the first casualty of the insurgency in Toronto at Montgomery's Tavern. He is buried in the neighboring hamlet of Dickson Hill. Architectural reminders of Ringwood’s small contribution to Canadian institutions defined by justice and liberty have all but disappeared.

One of the few remaining markers of the hamlet's history, the 1887 brick schoolhouse (and later church), was abandoned and sold in 2013. A nineteenth-century brick farm house behind the new auto mall development was destroyed by arson in 2007. A last historic farm home and unmarked cemetery are located on the newly developed Auto Mall Blvd. at Millard Street on the Little Rouge River; it is currently boarded up (see picture). The home was constructed in 1849 by Samuel Brownsberger (1825–1921), "the last of the surviving Mennonite settlers who came to York county (from Pennsylvania) during the early part of the last century."

Ringwood is a Rouge River watershed fisheries management zone. In the early nineteenth century, pioneer settlers speared large 50 pound salmon spawning on the upper tributaries of the Rouge as far north as Ringwood. Some of the Little Rouge River in Ringwood is still considered to provide high quality aquatic habitat. Today, the native target fish species that are being supported in the Little Rouge River in Ringwood include brook trout, redside dace, mottled sculpin, American brook lamprey, and rainbow darter. Ringwood is home to the Ringwood Fish Culture Station, which is also responsible for stocking a large proportion of Lake Ontario's stocking quota, including chinook salmon, rainbow trout, brown trout and Atlantic salmon. All stock is destined for Lake Ontario tributaries.

A 104-suite, five-story luxury condominium complex opened in Ringwood (Stouffville) in 2012; it backs on to the Little Rouge Creek conservation area. In 2012, auto magnate Frank Stronach purchased 260 acres of land at the south-west intersection of Stouffville Road and Highway 48 (formerly Ringwood Farms).

== Sister towns ==
- Ringwood, Hampshire, England

Ringwood became the third sister town of Ringwood, Hampshire, stemming from contact in late 1978.
