= Vivian Infiltration Area =

Hydrological infiltration complex in Whitchurch-Stouffville, Canada

Coordinates: 44.07°N 79.33°W

The Vivian Infiltration Area is an environmentally significant hydrological infiltration complex in Whitchurch–Stouffville, Ontario, Canada. It is primarily a heavily wooded forest. The Vivian Infiltration Area "contributes groundwater to the Oak Ridges aquifer complex".
