= CIWS-FM =

Radio station in Whitchurch–Stouffville, Ontario

Coordinates: 43°58′14″N 79°14′44″W

- Whitchurch–Stouffville, Ontario; Canada
- Frequency: 102.9 MHz
- Branding: WhiStle FM

Programming
- Format: community radio

Ownership
- Owner: WhiStle Community Radio

History
- First air date: March 17, 2008
- Call sign meaning: Community In Whitchurch-Stouffville

Technical information
- Class: low-power
- ERP: 50 watts

Links
- Website: whistlefm.ca

CIWS-FM is a Canadian radio station, which broadcasts a community radio format on 102.9 FM (formerly 102.7 FM) in Whitchurch–Stouffville, Ontario.

In November 2006, WhiStle Radio was granted a licence by the CRTC to operate as a low power community radio station. The new station would operate at 102.7 MHz (channel 274LP) with an effective radiated power of 50 watts.

The station formally launched on March 17, 2008.[2].

WhiStle Radio was awarded the Hall of Fame award by the Whitchurch–Stouffville Chamber of Commerce in September 2010.

On November 29, 2012, WhiStle Community Radio was denied a licence to change CIWS-FM's class from LP to A, changing the antenna's radiation pattern from non-directional to directional, increasing the average effective radiated power (ERP) from 50 to 193 watts (maximum ERP from 50 to 675 watts) and increasing the antenna's effective height above average terrain (HAAT) from 12 to 138 metres.

In the decision to deny the technical change, the CRTC said "The Commission finds that the licensee has not presented any compelling technical need for its request to change its class and increase its power." The CRTC also noted that "The applicant cited an agreement to function as an emergency broadcaster in support of its application" but that this agreement is contrary to Broadcasting Order 2009-340 and Broadcasting Decision 2011-438 and re-iterated in the decision that it is "inappropriate for any given broadcaster to act as the designated emergency broadcaster".

The Commission noted further that "The licensee did not file an annual return for CIWS-FM and for the 2007-2008 broadcast year, and annual returns for the 2008-2009, 2009-2010 and 2010-2011 broadcast years were either filed late or were incomplete."

and

"The Commission advises the licensee that the non-compliance will be considered at the time of the renewal of its licence. At that time, the Commission will review the circumstances that led to the non-compliance in question, the licensee's arguments and the measures taken to rectify the situation."

On April 11, 2016, the CRTC approved WhiStle Community Radio's application to change CIWS-FM's frequency from 102.7 MHz (channel 274LP) to 102.9 MHz (channel 275LP). Other technical parameters would remain unchanged. On May 18, 2016, CIWS-FM moved from 102.7 MHz to its current frequency at 102.9 MHz and changed its branding to WhiStleFM.

== Former logos ==
Original CIWS-FM logo 2008(?)-2016

Logo (undated) used until CIWS-FM's frequency change from 102.7 to 102.9 MHz in 2016
