= Dickson Hill, Ontario =

Dickson Hill
- Unincorporated community
- Interactive map of Dickson Hill
- Coordinates: 43°56′35″N 79°16′39″W
- Country: Canada
- Province: Ontario
- Regional municipality: York
- City: Markham
- Established: 1805
- Elevation: 233 m (764 ft)
- Time zone: UTC-5 (EST)
  - Summer (DST): UTC-4 (EDT)
- Area codes: 905 and 289
- NTS Map: 030M14
- GNBC Code: FEQSX

Dickson Hill is a small community in northeast Markham, Ontario, Canada, located near Highway 48 and 19th Avenue, on the border to Whitchurch-Stouffville.

Unlike other parts of Markham, the area around Dickson Hill has remained largely agricultural. The hamlet has a small church and a school. The original school house, built in 1861, has been relocated to Black Creek Pioneer Village in north-west Toronto.

== History ==
Dickson Hill was never the site of a post office, and thus had little official recognition historically as a place. However, in the 19th century it formed a concentration of rural economic and social activity as the site of a mill, school, and church. The mill was constructed by John Dickson, an early settler who was also the namesake for the community. The Dickson Hill Cemetery is one of the oldest in Markham, with one surviving grave dating back to 1803, and burials taking place possibly as early as the 1790s. Mennonites had a strong early influence on the community, and Mennonite church services were held at the original site of the church and cemetery early on. The schoolhouse, which was constructed in 1861, was later relocated to the Black Creek Pioneer Village.

John Dickson's grist mill was constructed possibly as early as 1837 or as late as 1844, and may have been preceded by a sawmill that had been built by Jacob Grove as early as 1831. The mill operated until 1954, when Hurricane Hazel destroyed parts of the dam. There was also a small sawmill on lot 31, concession 8, which was operated by the Ramer family. North of Dickson Hill on the road to Ringwood was the hamlet of Slabtown, which was a focal point for additional industrial activity as the site of a blacksmith shop, shingle mill, and cheese factory.

== Transportation ==
The Toronto/Markham Airport is located just south of Dickson Hill.

The Stouffville-Union Station GO Transit bus route connects Dickson Hill with Markham, Stouffville, and Toronto.

There is a proposed development of an international airport immediately south-east of Whitchurch-Stouffville (the Pickering Airport lands). The approach for one of the three landing strips would be directly over Dickson Hill, with planes descending above the community from an elevation of 360 metres to 330 metres. The plan anticipates 11.9 million passengers per year (or 32,600 per day) by 2032. A "Needs Assessment Study" was completed by the Greater Toronto Airports Authority for the federal government in May 2010. After a "due diligence review," Transport Canada released the report in July 2011, which identified the most likely time range for the need of the airport to be 2027-2029, and confirmed the site layout proposed in the 2004 Draft Plan Report.

Dickson Hill Road is the original alignment of Highway 48, but became a local secondary road to reduce non-local traffic. In 2021 the lower section was severed; thus the road ends with a dead end. An emergency gate is the only means for authorized road users to bypass the closure.

== Education ==
The former Dickson Hill Public School is now a private school after the former public elementary school closed in 2002 by the York Region District School Board with students transferred to Glad Park Public School in Stouffville. This school was built after 1960 when the original Dickson's Hill School (built in 1861 as S.S.#17) was relocated to Black Creek Pioneer Village.
