= Ballantrae, Ontario =

Ballantrae
- community
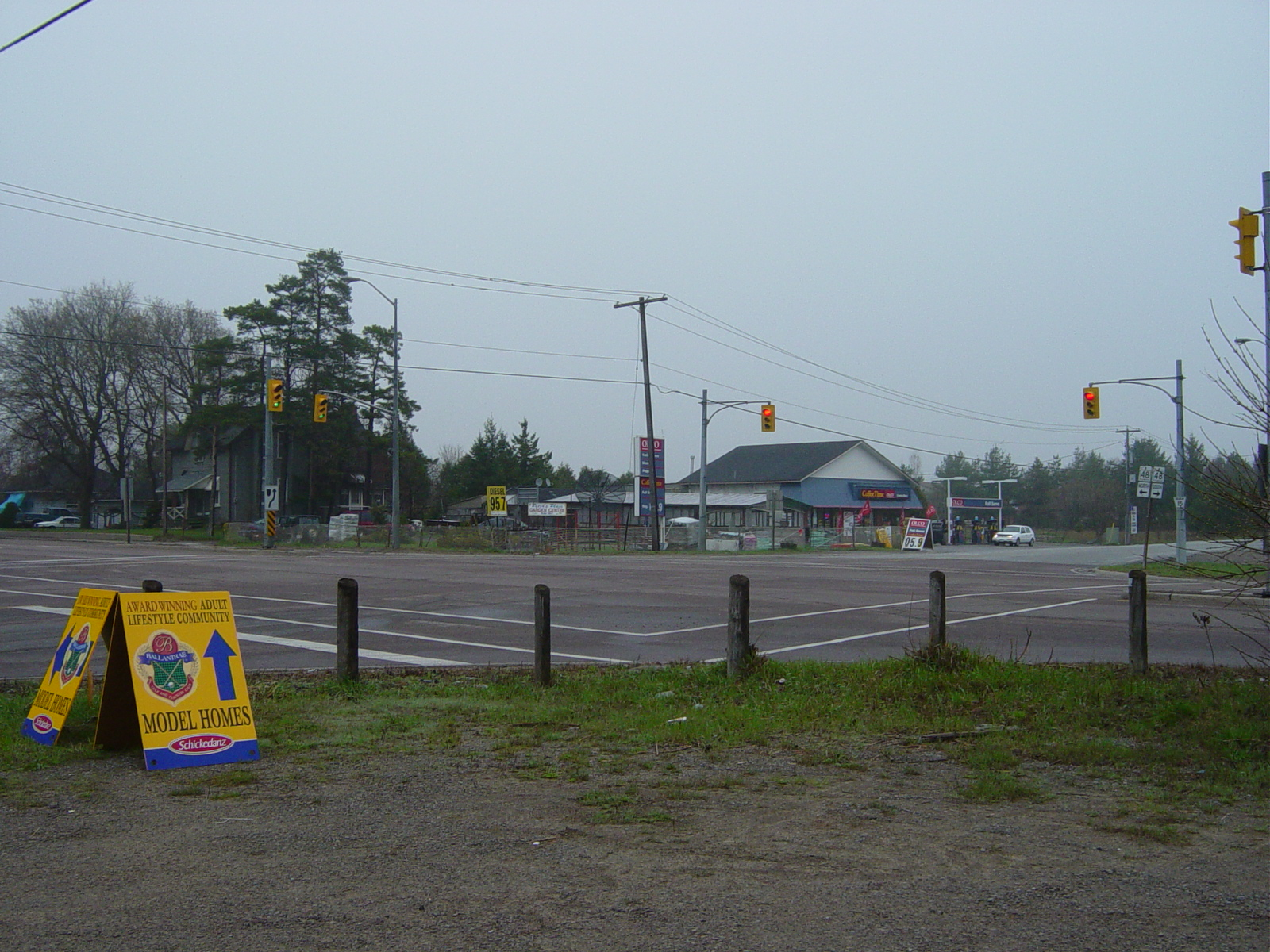
- Community of Ballantrae, Ontario.

- Location in southern Ontario
- Coordinates: 44°2′17″N 79°17′51″W
- Country: Canada
- Province: Ontario
- Regional municipality: York Region
- Town: Whitchurch–Stouffville
- Amalgamation: (With Town of Stouffville); 1 January 1971

Government
  - Type: Municipality
  - Mayor: Iain Lovatt
  - Councillor: Maurice Smith (Ward 2)

Area
  - Land: 2.15 km^{2} (0.83 sq mi)
- Elevation: 334 m (1,096 ft)

Population (2011)
  - Total: 1,382
  - Density: 643.6/km^{2} (1,667/sq mi)
- Time zone: UTC−5 (EST)
  - Summer (DST): UTC−4 (EDT)
- Forward sortation area: L4A
- Area codes: 905 and 289
- NTS Map: 031D03
- GNBC Code: FAENL L

Ballantrae, Ontario (2011 population 1,382) is a hamlet in the Town of Whitchurch–Stouffville. Named after the village of Ballantrae in South Ayrshire, Scotland, the community is centred on the intersection of Aurora Road (York Regional Road 15) and Highway 48.

== History ==
The hamlet was first settled in the early nineteenth century, and by 1895 it had a population of 300.

A spur-line of the Toronto and Nipissing Railway built in 1877 ran through Ballantrae from Stouffville to Jackson's Point on Lake Simcoe. In the early twentieth century, Ballantrae's population declined dramatically. Large-scale deforestation and erosion of the thin soil of northern Whitchurch Township created virtual sand deserts. With the passage of the Reforestation Act (1911), the process of reclaiming these areas slowly began. The Vivian Forest, a large conservation area on the edge of Ballantrae, was established in 1924 for this purpose.

== Vivian, Ontario ==
Vivian was initially an independent settlement located on the edge of a vast lumber industry centred at Highway 48 and Vivian Sideroad. The hamlet had a post office (southeast corner of Highway 48 and Vivian) and school house. Now downgraded to a community, the abandoned post office remains and school house replaced by Vivian Outdoor Centre.

== Current Development ==
Ballantrae experienced 300% growth between 2001 and 2006 to 1,278 people, and 8% growth between 2006 and 2011 with a total population of 1,382 people. In 2011, Ballantrae had 105 children age 17 and under, and has one public school of the same name (Ballantrae Public School) with 259 pupils. The Town of Whitchurch-Stouffville forecasts the population of Ballantrae to decline slightly between 2012 and 2031.

A significant issue facing Ballantrae in the coming years is the federal government's proposed development of an international airport directly south-east of Whitchurch-Stouffville (the Pickering Airport lands); under the current plan, an approach for one of the three landing strips would be directly above the communities of Ballantrae and Musselman's Lake, with planes descending (or ascending) from 535 to 500 metres. The 2004 plan calls for 11.9 million passengers per year (or 32,600 per day) by 2032. A "Needs Assessment Study" was completed by the Greater Toronto Airports Authority for the federal government in May 2010. After a "due diligence review," Transport Canada released the report in July 2011, and on June 11, 2013 announced a decision to proceed. The 2013 announcement was not challenged by the community's municipal leadership.

Residents have expressed concerns about wet basements and frequent operation of their sump pumps. In 1993, the Whitchurch Historical Committee said "Whitchurch-Stouffville residents" should be "vigilant to treat trees and forests with respect.... In the 1990s care must be taken so that urbanization and concrete road-building do not repeat the destruction to our forest heritage."
