= Origin of the Oak Ridges Moraine =

The Oak Ridges Moraine is a geological landform that runs east-west across south central Ontario, Canada. It developed about 12,000 years ago, during the Wisconsin glaciation in North America. A complex ridge of sedimentary material, the moraine is known to have partially developed under water. The Niagara Escarpment played a key role in forming the moraine in that it acted as a dam for glacial meltwater trapped between it and two ice lobes.

In order to understand the process by which the moraine formed, it is necessary to understand the physical geography in which it currently exists (that is, its physiography), and the layers of sediments found within it (the stratigraphy of the moraine).

== Regional physiography ==
The Oak Ridges Moraine consists of four elevated, wedge-shaped structures; from west to east, they are:

- The Albion Hills wedge,
- the Uxbridge wedge,
- the Pontypool wedge, and
- the Rice Lake wedge.

These wedges are separated by narrow east to west ridges, and formed via sedimentation. The hummocky terrain, small elevated plains and narrow ridges suggest that its formation is of glacial origin.

The moraine is nearly bisected in the east; the Rice Lake wedge is isolated from the three western wedges since the moraine is absent directly south of Rice Lake.

Four primary geophysical structures are intimately tied to the formative processes of the Oak Ridges Moraine:

- the Niagara Escarpment to the west
- drumlinized uplands in the north, with extensions south of the Oak Ridges Moraine
- wide, flat-floored valleys, primarily in the north
- low-relief plains in the south.

=== Niagara Escarpment ===
The western margin of the moraine is delineated by the Niagara Escarpment, a prominent cuesta that was fundamental to the development of the moraine. The escarpment's channels provided a route for drainage of ice-marginal meltwater; the channel system was eroded into the cuesta, and along its exposed eastern facing. Meltwater drained southwest and northeast along these corridors during the formation of the Oak Ridges Moraine. The Niagara Escarpment probably controlled regional water levels throughout the formation of the moraine.

=== Peterborough drumlin field ===
The Peterborough drumlin field is a large physiographic feature to the north of the Oak Ridges Moraine. It has a northeast to southwest orientation, and is cut by a network of deep valleys with wide, flat floors. The valleys are steep-sided, and have a branching pattern. The valley floors also exhibit inset eskers. The feature also extends south of the moraine.

== Stratigraphy ==
The Oak Ridges Moraine consists of numerous layers of sedimentary material, for some of which the origin is unknown. The base of the moraine touches bedrock; "it is not clear if the bedrock valley itself was sculpted by a subglacial meltwater event, or was of a preglacial fluvial origin, or was possibly a combination of both." (Davies and Holysh, 2004, pg 27-5) Above the bedrock are the Lower Sediments (as styled by the Geological Survey of Canada), consisting of diamict and fine-grained glaciolacustrine sediments at its base, and an upper sandy aquifer layer. (Davies and Holysh, 2004, pg 27-5). Overlaying this is a thick sequence of Newmarket Till, a sandy loam sedimentary layer common in the area.

Each wedge exhibits different characteristics and sedimentary patterns, thus displaying many incongruities and depositional unconformities. The Rice Lake wedge, for instance, achieves a peak of 180 m above sea level, with a 20 m layer of shallow surface Oak Ridges Moraine sediments, underlain by the Newmarket Till. The other wedges, which peak at up to 335 m, have thicker and more varied surficial deposits, and the Newmarket Till lies deeper below the surface. Moreover, the sedimentary deposits are underlain by Halton Till on these wedges, which is not present in the Rice Lake wedge.

Thus, from top to bottom, the stratigraphy of the moraine is:

- Oak Ridges Moraine sediments
- Halton Till (not present at Rice Lake)
- Channel sediments
- Newmarket Till
- Lower sediments (sandy aquifer above, diamict and glaciolacustrine units below)
- Bedrock

== Formation of the moraine ==
The most accepted theory of the development of the Oak Ridges Moraine is that proposed by Barnett et al. (1998). "Moraine development is highlighted in four stages and evolved rapidly from a glaciofluvial-dominated core to flanking glaciolacustrine-dominated wedge sediments." (Barnett et al., 1998, pg 1160)

The four distinct stages of the model are:

1. subglacial sedimentation,
2. subaqueous fan sedimentation,
3. fan to delta sedimentation, and
4. ice-marginal sedimentation.

However, the process by which each of these stages occurred has not been fully investigated, and is not completely understood.

=== Pre-formative history ===
During the Late Wisconsinan period, the central part of Ontario was under thick ice. An east-west fissure split the ice sheet at the western periphery of the Oak Ridges Moraine, creating the Simcoe ice lobe to the north, and the Ontario lobe to the south.

Moreover, the ice sheet's constant retreat created fractures where it met and scoured the bedrock. These fractures allowed the development of sub-glacial rivers (adj. glaciofluvial) and lakes (adj. glaciolacustrine).

With constant exposure to the sun, the surface of the ice sheet continued to melt; the meltwater flowed from high points to the north- and south-east, and from the Niagara Escarpment to the west, into the cavity created by the fissure. The fast-flowing meltwater rapidly eroded the surface of the cavity, and created channels beneath the surface of the ice.

=== Subglacial sedimentation ===
The meltwater eventually created a network of subglacial channels; many subglacial cavities also formed throughout the ice in the region. The sediment-laden meltwater travelled along these channels, increasingly depositing material in the cavities, and in the channels as the flow waned.

The channel fills along the core of the Oak Ridges Moraine are primarily coarse to fine, though the channel bases exhibit a thick sequence of coarse sediments.

Moreover, analysis of eskers within the deep valleys to the north of the moraine show that they tend to broaden to form gravel sheets. Accordingly, the "sedimentological data support the interpretation that the underfit valleys are tunnel channels eroded and filled with high-velocity. perhaps subglacial, meltwater." (Barnett et al., 1998, pg 1161)

=== Fan to delta sedimentation ===
The sedimentary deposits characteristic of this stage were lateral to, and overlying the deposits from the previous stage. Moreover, "[fan] sedimentation in this stage is distal to primary sediment input sources and occurs in a large ice-controlled lake." (Barnett et al., 1998, pg 1162) The most prominent process throughout this stage is the transition from fan to fan delta, and hence to deltaic sedimentation patterns, with extensive deposition of fine sand and silt rhythmites.

Because of the continued erosional effects of the rapidly flowing meltwater, a passage opened on the Niagara Escarpment, creating a channel to the Campbellville outlet. The opening of the outlet allowed significant water discharge from the area, causing the transition from a glaciolacustrine fan sedimentation (from the glacial lake filling the original cavity) to deltaic sedimentation. Additionally, observations demonstrate that the Uxbridge wedge, which sits at an elevation of 335 metres (1,099 ft), was produced by an ice-confined sedimentation pattern in a lake which water level was controlled by the Campbellville outlet.

=== Ice-marginal sedimentation ===
In the Humber River basin, "interbedded glaciolacustrine stratified sediments and massive to bedded diamicton" occurs in the upper deposition layers (Barnett et al., 1998, pg 1162). Some of these were deposited ice-marginally. In the east, deposition predominantly focused along the glacial margin, for example at the Palgrave Moraine.
