= Bethesda, Whitchurch-Stouffville =

Bethesda
- Unincorporated community
- Interactive map of Bethesda
- Coordinates: 43°58′02″N 79°21′17″W
- Country: Canada
- Province: Ontario
- Regional municipality: York Region
- Town: Whitchurch-Stouffville
- Amalgamation: (with Town of Stouffville); 1 January 1971

Government
  - Type: Municipality
  - Mayor: Iain Lovatt
  - Councillor, Ward 3: Hugo Kroon
- Elevation: 269 m (883 ft)
- Time zone: UTC−5 (EST)
  - Summer (DST): UTC−4 (EDT)
- Forward sortation area: L4A
- Area codes: 905 and 289

Bethesda is a hamlet in York Region, Ontario, Canada, in the town of Whitchurch-Stouffville. The hamlet is centred at the intersection of Warden Avenue and Bethesda Road in the south-eastern region of Whitchurch-Stouffville. It flourished around 1875.

Mennonites settled in the area starting with Christian Steckley, who came from Pennsylvania in 1795.

The community gained distinction with the formation of a private telephone company, the Bethesda and Stouffville Telephone Association, in 1904, with 1188 users from Newmarket to Markham by 1930. The entire system was purchased by Bell Telephone in 1960.
