= Pine Orchard, Ontario =

Pine Orchard
- Unincorporated community
- Interactive map of Pine Orchard
- Coordinates: 44°03′31″N 79°22′42″W
- Country: Canada
- Province: Ontario
- Regional municipality: York Region
- Town: Whitchurch–Stouffville
- Amalgamation: (with Village of Stouffville); 1 January 1971

Government
  - Type: Municipality
  - Mayor: Iain Lovatt
  - Councillor, Ward 1: Ken Ferdinands
- Elevation: 278 m (912 ft)
- Time zone: UTC−5 (EST)
  - Summer (DST): UTC−4 (EDT)
- Forward sortation area: L4A
- Area codes: 905 and 289

Pine Orchard is a hamlet in York Region, Ontario, Canada, in the town of Whitchurch–Stouffville. It is centred at the intersection of Warden Avenue and Vivian Road in the north-western region of Whitchurch–Stouffville.

The original settlers were Quakers who, like the early Mennonites of Whitchurch and Markham townships, were pacifists who came north after the American Revolution. The founder of the hamlet was Isaac Phillips, who arrived from Muncy County, Pennsylvania in 1802.

A first post office was established in 1853, and by 1860 three sawmills were operating in the area.

In 1858 the hamlet had a population of 35.

The community flourished towards the end of the nineteenth century until township. However, at the beginning of the twentieth century the township was almost completely deforested, and the forest industry collapsed. The hamlet's post office closed in 1914.
