= Pleasantville, Ontario =

Pleasantville
- Unincorporated community
- Interactive map of Pleasantville
- Coordinates: 44°03′10″N 79°24′12″W
- Country: Canada
- Province: Ontario
- Regional municipality: York Region
- Town: Whitchurch–Stouffville
- Amalgamation: (With Village of Stouffville); 1 January 1971

Government
  - Type: Municipality
  - Mayor: Iain Lovatt
  - Councillor: Ken Ferdinands, Ward 1
- Elevation: 290 m (950 ft)
- Time zone: UTC−5 (EST)
  - Summer (DST): UTC−4 (EDT)
- Forward sortation area: L4A
- Area codes: 905 and 289

Pleasantville is a community located in the Town of Whitchurch–Stouffville, Ontario, Canada.

It is a small hamlet consisting of mainly farms, residential homes and horse ranches. Pleasantville was originally settled by Quakers from Pennsylvania in the early nineteenth century.

Pleasantville is situated east of Highway 404 and can be reached from Vivian Sideroad (Mulock Drive) by driving north on Woodbine Avenue.
