= Lemonville, Ontario =

Lemonville
- Unincorporated community
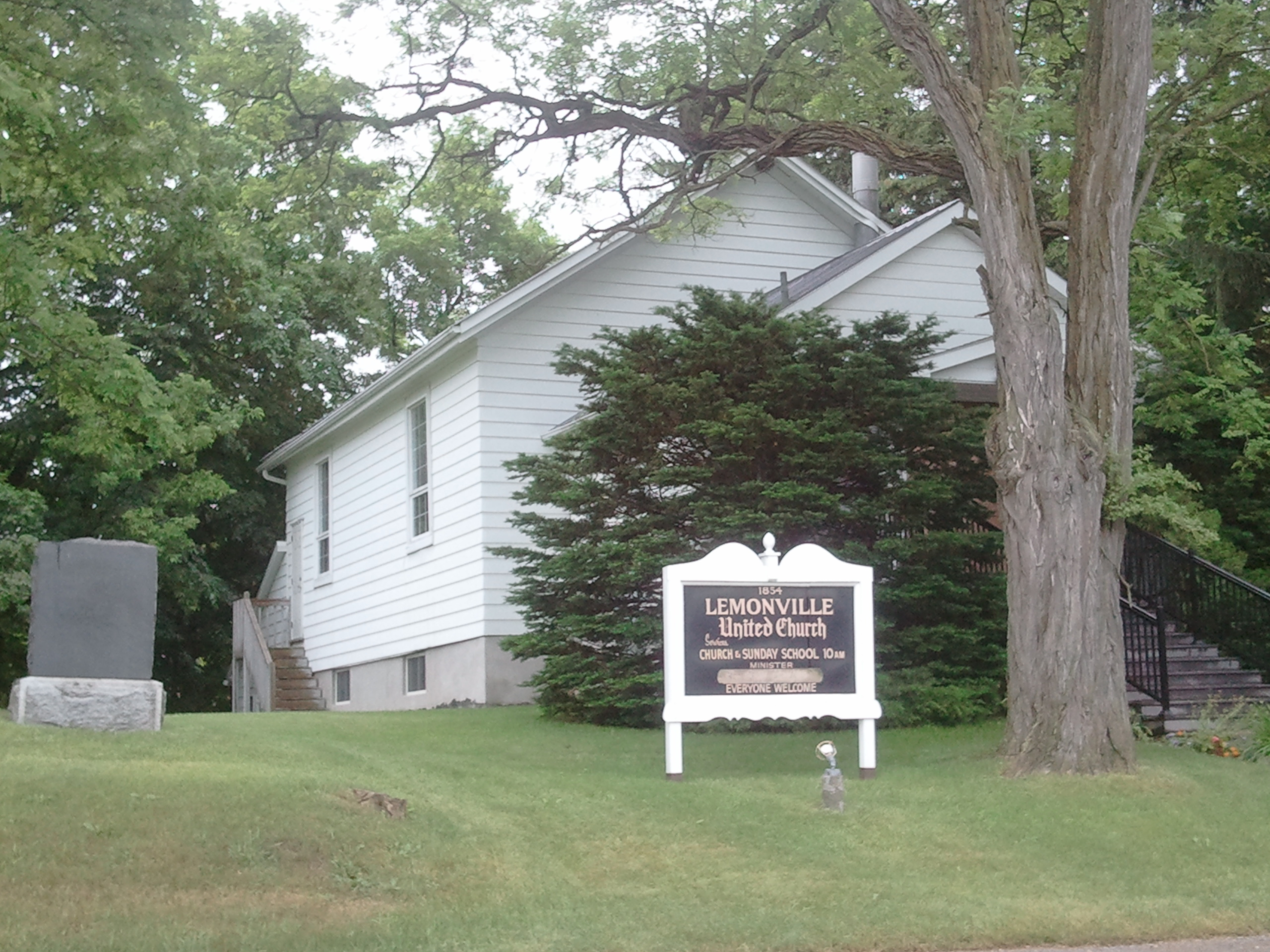
- Lemonville United Church
- Interactive map of Lemonville
- Coordinates: 43°59′19″N 79°18′32″W
- Country: Canada
- Province: Ontario
- Regional municipality: York Region
- Town: Whitchurch–Stouffville
- Amalgamation: (With Town of Stouffville); 1 January 1971

Government
  - Type: Municipality
  - Mayor: Iain Lovatt
  - Councillor, Ward 3: Hugo Kroon
- Elevation: 290 m (950 ft)
- Time zone: UTC−5 (EST)
  - Summer (DST): UTC−4 (EDT)
- Forward sortation area: L4A
- Area codes: 905 and 289

Lemonville is a hamlet in York Region, Ontario, Canada, in the town of Whitchurch–Stouffville. The hamlet is centred at the intersection of McCowan Road and Bloomington Road, in the geographical centre of Whitchurch-Stouffville.

The settlement was named after George Lemon Sr. (1774–1834) of Oxford, New Jersey, who was granted land at this location in 1805. Methodist services first took place there in 1854, and the Lemonville Methodist Church (later United Church) was constructed in 1856. McEvoy's Province of Ontario Gazetteer and Directory of 1869 lists Lemonville as a village with a population of 75. In 1877, Lemonville reached a population of 100. Village industries included a boot and shoe factory, carriage works, cabinet maker, woollen mills, and a shoe repair shop. It was bypassed by the Toronto and Nipissing Railway in favour of Stouffville when it was constructed in 1871.

The Lemonville post office closed in 1937.

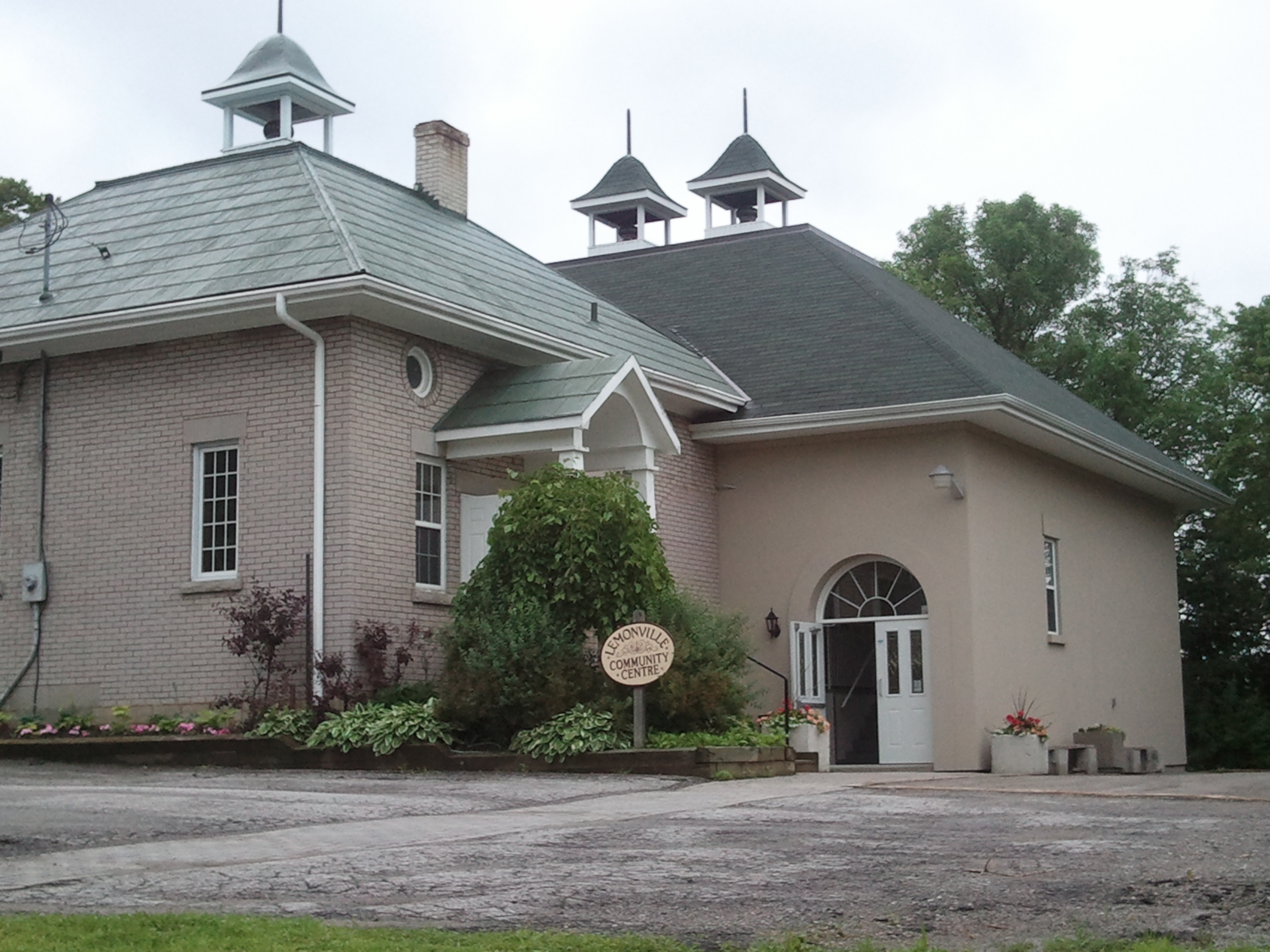
Lemonville Community Centre
