= List of numbered roads in York Region =

List of regional roads

York Region, located in southcentral Ontario, Canada, assigned approximately 50 regional roads, each with a number ranging from 1 to 99. All expenses for York Regional Roads (i.e: maintenance, traffic lights, and snow clearing) are funded by the York Region government. Several new roads were assumed by the region include King–Vaughan Town Line and Kirby Sideroad. Most north-south roads originating in Toronto retains the proper names from south of Steeles Avenue.

Roads on Georgina Island are maintained by Chippewas of Georgina Island First Nation despite the island being within York Region.

Roads are generally paved with some gravel roads in less populated areas. Before the 20th Century most cleared roads were dirt roads.

== Types of roads ==
=== King's Highways ===
There are 161 kilometres (100 mi) of provincially maintained highways, termed "provincial highways" or "King's Highways".

As in the rest of Ontario, the provincially maintained highways in York Region are designated with a shield-shaped sign topped with a crown. The highway number is in the centre, with the name ONTARIO below. These signs are known as shields.

Provincially maintained highways generally have greater construction standards than municipally or locally maintained roads. Although they are usually one lane in either direction, several short sections with two lanes in one direction as a passing lane exist along the highways.

York Region is also home to three 400-series highways, which are controlled-access freeways.

=== Toll highway ===
York Region is home to a privately maintained (but provincially-owned) toll freeway, the 407 ETR. The freeway crosses the Region east-west near the southern border. Toll rates vary depending on the section, time of day, and mileage driven.

=== Regional Roads ===
York Regional Roads are signed with a flowerpot-shaped sign, as are most regional and county roads in Ontario. The road number appears in the centre of the sign, with the word REGION above and the word YORK below. Like King's Highways, these signs are known as shields. As par standard practice in regional municipalities, they run through and are signed in urban areas in addition to rural areas.

== King's Highways ==
The following is a list of provincially maintained highways in York Region. Communities are ordered by where the route encounters them (either from south to north or from west to east).

| Route | Length | | Western/Southern Terminus | Eastern/Northern Terminus | Municipalities/ Communities | Comments |
| Route | km | mi | Western/Southern Terminus | Eastern/Northern Terminus | Municipalities/ Communities | Comments |
|---|---|---|---|---|---|---|
| Highway 48 | 58 | 36 | Major Mackenzie Drive (York Regional Road 25) | Durham Regional Road 23 | Markham, Whitchurch-Stouffville (Stouffville), Whitchurch-Stouffville (Ballantrae), East Gwillimbury (Mount Albert), Georgina (Sutton) | |
| Highway 404 | 44 | 27 | Steeles Avenue | Woodbine Avenue (York Regional Road 8) | Richmond Hill, Markham, Aurora, Newmarket, Whitchurch-Stouffville, East Gwillimbury, Georgina | Highway 404 forms the eastern/western borders of part of Richmond Hill/Markham, Richmond Hill/Whitchurch-Stouffville, Aurora/Whitchurch-Stouffville, Newmarket/Whitchurch-Stouffville, and part of Newmarket/East Gwillimbury. |
| Highway 400 | 32 | 20 | Steeles Avenue | Canal Road | Vaughan, King (King City) | |
| Highway 9 | 15.5 | 9.6 | Caledon-King Townline | east of Highway 400 | King (Schomberg) | Forms the border between York Region and Simcoe County between Caledon-King Townline and Canal Road. |
| Highway 427 | 9 | 5.6 | Steeles Avenue | Major Mackenzie Drive (York Regional Road 25) | Vaughan | |
| Highway 7 | 3 | 1.9 | Reesor Road | York-Durham Line (York Regional Road 30; Durham Regional Road 30) | Markham (Locust Hill) | |

=== Express freeways ===
| Route | Length | | Western/Southern Terminus | Eastern/Northern Terminus | Municipalities | Comments |
| Route | km | mi | Western/Southern Terminus | Eastern/Northern Terminus | Municipalities | Comments |
|---|---|---|---|---|---|---|
| 407 Express Toll Route | 41 | 25 | Highway 50 (Peel Regional Road 50; York Regional Road 24) | York-Durham Line (York Regional Road 30) | Vaughan, Richmond Hill, Markham | Privately owned toll freeway |

== Georgina Island ==
The main arterial road is a series of different named roads:

- Bear Road - runs along south side of Georgina Island
- Chief Joseph Snake Road - runs along western side of Georgina Island and transitions to Loon Road at northern tip
- Loon Road - runs along eastern side of Georgina Island and transitions to Chief Joseph Snake Road at northern tip

== Boundaries of York Region ==
- Steeles Avenue marks the York Region/Toronto boundary, internally designated as York Regional Road 95
- York–Durham Regional Road 30 (York–Durham Line), York Regional Road 32 (Ravenshoe Road), and Durham Region Road 23 (Lake Ridge Road) marks the York Region/Durham Region boundary
- York Regional Road 24 (or Peel Regional Road 50) marks the York Region/Peel Region boundary
- Highway 9 and Holland River form the York Region/Simcoe County boundary

Georgina Island, Fox Island and Snake Island are within York Region, but are also part of the Chippewas of Georgina Island First Nation.

== Regional Roads ==
| Regional road # | Proper Name | Western/Northern terminus | Eastern/Southern terminus | Municipalities | Additional notes/Traffic |
|---|---|---|---|---|---|
| | Yonge Street; Highway 11 | York Region/Simcoe County boundary | Steeles Avenue | Markham, Vaughan, Richmond Hill, Aurora, Newmarket, East Gwillimbury | Formerly Highway 11. This road is the central divider of York Region (and Toronto, from where it continues). Very busy road (especially in Richmond Hill, Markham, and Vaughan). Yonge Street turns off York Road 1 south of Holland Landing and is signed York Road 51, while York Road 1 continues northwest to Bradford in Simcoe County under the decommissioned highway name Highway 11. The Viva Blue BRT line serves Yonge Street. |
| | Kennedy Road | Lake Drive East in Georgina | Steeles Avenue | Markham, Whitchurch–Stouffville, East Gwillimbury, Georgina | Continues from Toronto. Before naming it was the 6th Line. Former sections of Kennedy before the present alignment include Old Kennedy Road, Fresno Circuit, and Main Street Unionville. Section bypassing Main Street Unionville was briefly named Unionville By-pass. York Regional Road status was interrupted between Davis Drive (continues briefly north to dead end) and Herald Road. The interruption due to the existence of the Bendor and Grave Tract (York Regional Forest), created by re-forestation of developed land acquired by the province beginning in 1924. Pheasant Run Golf Course's eastern end overlaps roadway. Its length is 68km (including Toronto parts of Kennedy road) |
| | Keele Street | Lloydtown-Aurora Road | Steeles Avenue | Vaughan, King | Continues from Toronto. Unsigned road continues north of Lloydtown-Auroa Road as to King Street then becomes 4th Concession Road ending just before the Holland River. Briefly across the Holland River is a short roadway called Keele Lane which end shortly at Tornado Road. |
| | Highway 7 | York Region/Peel Region Boundary | Reesor Road | Vaughan, Richmond Hill, Markham | This route is a heavily travelled route, especially between Highway 400 and McCowan Road in Vaughan, Richmond Hill, and Markham. Most of Viva Orange and Viva Purple run on Highway 7. The road was part of Ontario Highway 7 before the 1997 downloadings. Portions in Markham were once called Wellington Street (a short section still exists south of 7 at Main Street Markham). Provincial highway status resumes east of Donald Cousens Parkway. |
| | Woodbine Avenue | Lake Drive North in Georgina | Steeles Avenue / Highway 404 | Markham, Whitchurch–Stouffville, Georgina | Runs closely parallel to Highway 404. Formerly continued south into Toronto, with that section today incorporated into Highway 404, which was constructed on a separate alignment to the west through York Region. Connects with the highway south of Steeles with directional ramps. In 2010, the Woodbine Avenue By-Pass, was opened to preserve the community of Victoria Square in Markham as urbanization encroached; with the old alignment renamed Victoria Square Boulevard', though the bypass was redesignated as part of Woodbine Avenue proper in 2015. Several former road stub exists with new names after various realignments: Union Street, in Gormley south of Stouffville Road. |
| | Baseline Road | Woodbine Avenue | Dalton Road | Georgina | Road is a suffixed route that runs east-west and defaults from Woodbine Avenue (RR #8), (with a turn required for traffic to continue along Woodbine). The road is also secretly designated as number #88. Road name derived from early road surveying commonly used in the 19th and early 20th Centuries in Ontario. |
| | Dalton Road; Main Street Sutton (High Street) | Lake Drive East | Highway 48 | Georgina | Two of the roads pass through the centre of the village of Sutton. Richard Dalton was a landowner in nearby Virginia located near the Roman Catholic Church along the route from Highway 48 east of Sutton. |
| | King Road | York Region/Peel Region Boundary | Yonge Street | Richmond Hill, King | It passes through King City, Nobleton and Oak Ridges. Named for Major John King, British Under-Secretary of State. Formerly 14th Sideroad. |
| | Don Mills Road; Leslie Street; The Queensway | Metro Road South and Morton Avenue | Steeles Avenue | Markham, Richmond Hill, Aurora, Newmarket, East Gwillimbury, Georgina | Continues from Toronto as Don Mills Road at Steeles Avenue and becomes Leslie Street north of John Street. Becomes The Queensway and passes through the centre of Keswick. This section is proposed to be renamed Main Street Keswick in the future. Leslie Street also continues from Toronto, but a short section north of Steeles is bypassed and/or broken (hence the portion following Don Mills Road) due to geography including (German Mills Park, Duncan Creek) and the German Mills residential area; section from Steeles to slightly north of Simonston Boulevard was once part of German Mills Road. The section of Leslie from Steeles to Waterloo Court is not part of the regional road. All sections of Leslie in Markham were once signed as 3rd Line. |
| | Mount Albert Road; Bradford Street | Holland Landing Road | York–Durham Line | East Gwillimbury | Connects Holland Landing, Sharon and Mount Albert |
| | Stouffville Road; Main Street Stouffville; King–Vaughan Line | Pine Valley Drive | York–Durham Line | Richmond Hill, Whitchurch–Stouffville | It passes through the centre of Gormley and Stouffville. It is one of the busiest rural roads in York Region. Named for Stouffville founder Abraham Stouffer. Regional Road status interrupted between Bathurst and Yonge Streets. Formerly as known as Whitchurch Town Line before merger of Whitchurch-Stouffville. |
| | Wellington Street; Aurora Road | Dufferin Street | York–Durham Line | King, Aurora, Whitchurch–Stouffville | Passes through the centre of Aurora. The Aurora GO Station can also be found on this road. Follows or formerly known as 17th Sideroad. |
| | Lloydtown-Aurora Road | Highway 27 | Bathurst Street | King | Accessible to Highway 400, links Aurora and Lloydtown. From Highway 27 to 8th Concession it follows the 19th sideroad. At the 8th, to avoid Pottageville swamp, it curves diagonally southwards until it reaches 7th Concession road. From the 7th to 5th Concession Road (Jane St), it runs roughly due east, between sideroads. At Jane St, it turns south until it reaches the former 18th sideroad. Turning east again, it follows the former 18th to Dufferin (3rd Concession). At Dufferin, it turns east, running on 17th sideroad. |
| | Islington Avenue | Major Mackenzie Drive | Steeles Avenue | Vaughan | Continues from Toronto. Mostly running along the Humber River, this road is steep at times with many curves. North of Major Mackenzie the road is not signed and merges with Highway 27 north of Nashville Road. |
| | Park Road | Hedge Road in Georgina | Ravenshoe Road | Georgina | The road passes through Sibbald Point Provincial Park, and accessible to Highway 48 |
| | Green Lane | Bathurst Street | Woodbine Avenue | East Gwillimbury | Former northern terminus of Highway 404, on which it is marked as a truck route to Highway 400. Not to be mistaken for road of the same name in Markham. |
| | Pefferlaw Road | Highway 48 | Lake Ridge Road (York Region/Durham Region Boundary) | Georgina | Passes through the centre of Pefferlaw |
| 24 (Unsigned) | Highway 50 | Mayfield Road (Peel Regional Road 14) / Albion-Vaughan Road | Steeles Avenue | Vaughan | Formerly provincial Highway 50. Unsigned as a York regional road, but signed as Peel Road 50, which it shares jurisdiction with, as it forms the boundary between York and Peel Regions. Continues north from Toronto's Albion Road. |
| | Major Mackenzie Drive | Highway 50 | York–Durham Line | Vaughan, Richmond Hill, Markham | Major suburban thoroughfare in Markham and Vaughan spanning the width of the Region. Once called Markham Road as the eastern end reached into Markham. Now named after Major Addison Alexander "Lex" Mackenzie, a former provincial politician and First World War veteran. |
| | St. John's Sideroad; 18th Sideroad | Bathurst Street | Woodbine Avenue | Aurora, Whitchurch–Stouffville | No access to Highway 404 with overpass only. |
| | Highway 27 | Highway 9 or York Region/Simcoe County boundary | Steeles Avenue | Vaughan, King | Formerly Highway 27 (referred to as Simcoe County Road 27 in Simcoe County). In Vaughan and King, it generally follows the former 9th Concession Road. |
| | Gamble Road; 19th Avenue; Kirby Road | Bathurst Street | Leslie Street | Richmond Hill, Markham, Vaughan | One of the rural roads in York Region, and extending Kirby Road to Bathurst. Portion named for former York County Warden John William Gamble. Kirby was likely named for settler Nathaniel Kirby. Kirby Road running from Dufferin to Albion-Vaughan Road, will likely become part this regional road in the future. In 2019, Gamble Road was realigned at Leslie Street to compensate for old surveying errors, and to create a continuous routing. |
| | York–Durham Line (Also Durham Regional Road 30) | Ravenshore Road in Georgina | Steeles Avenue | Markham, Whitchurch–Stouffville, East Gwillimbury | Separates Durham Region and York Region. North of East Gwillimbury road continues as Concession Road 1 and Miles Road terminating at Highway 48 in Baldwin; south of Steeles/Taunton Road continues as Scarborough-Pickering Townline terminating at Finch Avenue. |
| | Davis Drive | Highway 400 | York–Durham Region boundary | King, Newmarket, East Gwillimbury, Whitchurch–Stouffville | One of the busiest rural roads in York Region, separates East Gwillimbury and Whitchurch–Stouffville. The road is still referred to as Davis Drive east into Durham Region. the section west of Yonge Street was formerly part of Highway 9 before being downloaded to the region, although west of Highway 400 the road remains Highway 9. Named for the Davis Leather Company (moved to area by Andrew Davis, son of the founder of Lowell Tannery of King Township and later ran by son Elihu James Davis and Aubrey Davis). |
| | Ravenshoe Road | Holland River at a dead end | Lakeridge Road (Durham Regional Road 23) | Georgina | Pronounced "Raven shoe"; runs from southeast of Keswick to Udora. Thomas and William Glover operated Ravenshoe Hotel on the roadway. |
| | Glenwoods Avenue | The Queensway South | Woodbine Avenue | Georgina | One of the busiest roads of Keswick, from the Queensway South-Woodbine Avenue |
| | Bayview Avenue; Prospect Street; 2nd Concession Road | Queensville Sideroad | Steeles Avenue | Markham, Richmond Hill, Aurora, Newmarket | Very busy with a lot of traffic especially in Markham and Richmond Hill. Continuation of Bayview Avenue from Toronto. Regional road status is interrupted between Davis Drive and Green Lane. |
| | Bathurst Street | York Regional Road 1 (Former Highway 11) / Holland Landing Road | Steeles Avenue | Vaughan, King, Newmarket | Continues from Toronto. The road was interrupted by the natural landscape in King where Old Bathurst Street runs further west and south of Mulock Drive. |
| | Bloomington Road / 15th Sideroad | Keele Street | York–Durham Line | Richmond Hill, Whitchurch–Stouffville | East of Bloomington, it was formerly Highway 47, one of the busiest rural roads in York Region West of Bloomington it follows 15th Sideroad. Named for the hamlet of Bloomington in Stouffville. |
| | Doane Road | Yonge Street | Woodbine Avenue | East Gwillimbury | Runs from Holland Landing to south of Queensville. While not part of Regional Road 50, Doane Road exists in two sections: West of Yonge Doane Road West ends at East Branch of the Holland River and east of Woodbine Avenue runs to McCowan Road with break and continues from east of Highway 48 to York-Durham Townline. Named for Ebenezer Doane, Quaker settler in Newmarket and related to John Doane. |
| | Donald Cousens Parkway | Major Mackenzie Drive | Steeles Avenue | Markham | The road was built as a truck route (with trucks subsequently banned from Main Street Markham). Formerly called Markham Bypass from the 1980s to 1990s, the road is now named after the former mayor of Markham, Donald Cousens. The road is expected to be extended to Highway 48 in the future, with construction planned to start in 2026. |
| | Elgin Mills Road; Teston Road; Nashville Road | York Region/Peel Region Boundary (Peel Regional 50 / York Regional Road 24) | Victoria Square Boulevard | Vaughan, Richmond Hill, Markham | York Regional Road status was interrupted between Highway 27 and Pine Valley Drive, and also between Keele Street and Dufferin Street. Elgin Mills was a post office established in Richmond Hill in 1900 and named for James Bruce, 8th Earl of Elgin. Non-regional road section of Elgin Mills runs from Victoria Square Boulevard east to York-Durham Town Line (ends in Mongolia, Ontario). Road was also referred to as Peaches Sideroad as it passed through Peaches located at McCowan Road and Elgin Mills Road. |
| | Yonge Street | Queensville Sideroad | Yonge Street | East Gwillimbury | The road passes through the centre of Holland Landing and is a bypassed (to through traffic) section of Yonge Street. Continuation of Yonge Street from southern York Region. |
| | Dufferin Street | Lloydtown-Aurora Road/18th Sideroad | Steeles Avenue | King, Vaughan | Sometimes referred to as 3rd Concession Road. Continues from Toronto. As non-regional road Dufferin runs north and ends at Holland Marsh. |
| | Jane Street | Highway 9 | Steeles Avenue | King, Vaughan | Continues from Toronto. Two of the only TTC subway stations outside the City of Toronto are located on or near Jane Street in or near Vaughan Metropolitan Centre. |
| | Weston Road | Highway 9 | Steeles Avenue | King, Vaughan | Formerly the 6th Concession Road. Continuation of Weston Road in Toronto. A short stub called Old Weston Road was the former alignment of the roadway that was removed to align with the Toronto section of the road. Non-regional road section of Weston Roads ends north of Highway 9 at Woodchoppers Lane. |
| | Pine Valley Drive | Teston Road | Steeles Avenue | Vaughan | Pine Valley Drive's York Regional Road status was interrupted between Langstaff Road and Rutherford Road |
| | Warden Avenue | Baseline Road | Steeles Avenue | Markham, Whitchurch–Stouffville, East Gwillimbury | Passes through the centre of Downtown Markham. Several traffic lights cause traffic to jam frequently up between Apple Creek and Highway 7. Continuation of Warden Avenue in Toronto. |
| | McCowan Road | Southern segment - Bloomington Road/York Regional Road 40; Northern segment - Ravenshoe Road/York Regional Road 32 | Southern segment - Steeles Avenue; Northern segment - Davis Drive/York Regional Road 31. Before renaming it was signed as 7th Line. | Markham, Whitchurch–Stouffville, East Gwillimbury, Georgina | Continues from McCowan Road in Toronto from the southern border at Steeles Avenue to Baseline Road (York RR 8A) in Georgina in the north, a distance of some 53 kilometres (33 mi), with one break of about 250 metres (820 ft) in the middle of the concession between St. John's Sideroad in the south and Vivian Road (York RR 74) in the north because of a gorge of a tributary of the Black River. The entire length is signed as McCowan Road, but officially as York Regional Road 67 for only two segments: the southern segment, between Steeles Avenue in the south and Bloomington Road/York RR 40 in the north; and the northern segment, between Davis Drive/York RR 31 in the south and Ravenshoe Road/York RR 32 in the north. |
| | Markham Road; Main Street Markham | Major Mackenzie Drive | Steeles Avenue | Markham | Formerly Highway 48 (downloaded in 1997), the road remains Highway 48 north of Major Mackenzie Drive. Continuation of Markham Road in Toronto from Steeles Avenue to Highway 407. Non-regional road from north of Highway 407 with road named Main Street Markham through Markham Village (between Hwy. 407 and 16th Avenue), which is divided into north-south sections at Highway 7 and as Markham Road from 16th Avenue to Major Mackenzie Drive. |
| | Ninth Line; Box Grove By-pass; Donald Cousens Parkway | Aurora Road | Steeles Avenue | Markham, Whitchurch–Stouffville | Begins at a T-intersection at Steeles Avenue along the Toronto-York Region border, following Ninth Line north, before curving east to follow Donald Cousens Parkway. It then intersects at the Box Grove By-pass (Constructed in 2006-2007), which curves to rejoin Ninth Line just south of Highway 407. Ninth Line itself is bypassed through the former hamlet of Box Grove, ending at dead ends north of Rouge Bank Drive in the north and Sanders Drive near Donald Cousens Parkway in the south. North of the 407, Ninth Line divides Markham Village and Cornell. The jog north of Donald Cousens will be likely be eliminated by future road work by the region. The name Ninth Line is the original number assigned in the 1793-1794 surveying and was never named. North of Aurora Road Ninth Line continues as local road to Vivian Creek Road and ends as a driveway into Mount Albert water tower. Sometimes referred to as 9th Concession Road. |
| | 14th Avenue / Alden Road / Centre Street | Highway 7 | York–Durham Line | Markham, Vaughan | Has two sections, mostly following 14th Avenue through Markham and Centre Street in Vaughan. York Regional Road status is interrupted between Warden Avenue and Bathurst Street. West of Warden Avenue it briefly is signed as Alden Road and resumes by turning north opposite Hood Road, following a bypassed section of 14th Avenue, despite the remainder of Alden Road, a section of Esna Park Drive, and John Street creating a direct link between the through portion of 14th Avenue and Centre Street (albeit partially with only two lanes and a jog), which picks up the Regional Road 71 designation west of Bathurst. 14th Avenue itself ends at a dead end at Highway 404. Originally ran west of 404 to end at Bayview Avenue but this section was removed as a through road as residential areas developed, with the remaining section being parts of Green Lane, Bronte Road, Littlebrook Court, and 14th Lane. There are two sections of roadway re-routed: at Donald Cousens Parkway, a former section is now an abandoned gravel stub and a short section west of Markham Road is named Old 14th Avenue and leads into a retail plaza. Centre Street begins at Yonge Street and heads westward and bends north after Dufferin Street to end at Highway 7. |
| | Langstaff Road | York Region/Peel Region boundary | Highway 7 | Vaughan | The road is interrupted twice. The first time is between Keele Street and Jane Street because of the CN rail yard. The second time is between Islington Avenue and Highway 27 because of the Humber River. Road likely linked to settler John Langstaff, whose property, along with Yonge Street, later became Langstaff Farm Jail. |
| | 16th Avenue; Carrville Road; Rutherford Road | York Region/Peel Region boundary | York–Durham Line | Vaughan, Richmond Hill, Markham | One of the busiest roads in York Region and spanning its width. It is often congested during rush hours in the vicinity of Vaughan Mills mall in Vaughan and between Kennedy Road and Warden Avenue in Markham. Road connects with Castlemore Road west of Highway 50 (now Peel Regional Road 50) in Brampton, then as Bovaird Drive (Peel Regional Roads 10 and 107) within Peel Region. In Halton Region (near Norval), the road continues west into Georgetown as the western segment of Highway 7. |
| | Mulock Drive; Vivian Sideroad | Bathurst Street | York–Durham Line | Newmarket, Whitchurch–Stouffville | Passes through the Newmarket Theatre. Road likely to have been named for former Newmarket resident Sir William Mulock. Follows or formerly 19th Sideroad. |
| | Morton Avenue | The Queensway South | Woodbine Avenue | Georgina | |
| | Queensville Sideroad | Bathurst Street | Woodbine Avenue | East Gwillimbury | Connects River Drive Park, Holland Landing and Queensville. |
| | Metro Road | The Queensway South | Dalton Road | Georgina | Built on the former right-of-way of the Toronto and York Radial Railway, it passes through the centre of the community of Keswick |
| | Old Homestead Road; Station Road | Metro Road North | Pefferlaw Road | Georgina | Former centre in northern Georgina, leads to the village of Pefferlaw. |
| | Black River Road | Dalton Road | Park Road | Georgina | Named after Black River in Jackson's Point. |
| | Weir's Sideroad | Old Homestead Road | Ravenshoe Road | Georgina | Passes through the village of Virginia and the village of Pefferlaw. |
| | Victoria Road | Ravenshoe Road | Lake Ridge Road (York Region/Durham Region Boundary) | Georgina | This was also declared as Durham Road 1, north of Ravenshoe Road. |
| | Holland Landing Road | Yonge Street | Toll Road | East Gwillimbury | Passes through the centre of Holland Landing, on the west side of the Holland River East branch. |
| 95 (Unsigned) | Steeles Avenue | Highway 50 | York-Durham Line | Vaughan, Markham, Toronto | Southern boundary of York Region, bordering Toronto and spanning the width of the Region (and Toronto), with a short section near Kipling Avenue entirely within Toronto where it dips south. Not signed and internally designated only. |
| 99 (Former) | Highway 427 | Zenway Boulevard | North end of Highway 427 at Highway 7 | Vaughan | Former York Region-built non-freeway extension of Highway 427. Ran 700 m (2,300 ft) north from Highway 7 to Zenway Boulevard. Closed and removed August 8, 2020 due to construction to tie in existing Highway 427 lanes to extension work ahead of the freeway's completion (opened Sept 2021). |

== Regional Road Map ==
- York.ca/RegionalRoads

Roads highlighted as red are signed York Regional Roads.
