= Holt, Ontario =

Holt
- Village
- Interactive map of Holt
- Coordinates: 44°07′25″N 79°20′36″W
- Country: Canada
- Province: Ontario

Population
  - Estimate (2011): >500
- Area code: 905

Holt is a former village which has been incorporated into the municipality of the Town of East Gwillimbury, Ontario, Canada, formerly the Township of East Gwillimbury. The municipal offices of the town are located in Sharon.

The village is centred on the crossroads of Mt. Albert Rd and McCowan Rd. It is served by Highway 404 which is accessed via the Green Lane interchange. Before 2001, the nearest interchange was several kilometres south at Davis Drive in Newmarket. An extension of the highway to points further north was opened in September 2014.

== Surrounding communities ==
- Queensville, north
- Mount Albert, east
- Newmarket south
- Sharon, west

== See also ==
- List of communities in Ontario
