= Holland Landing =

- Unincorporated community
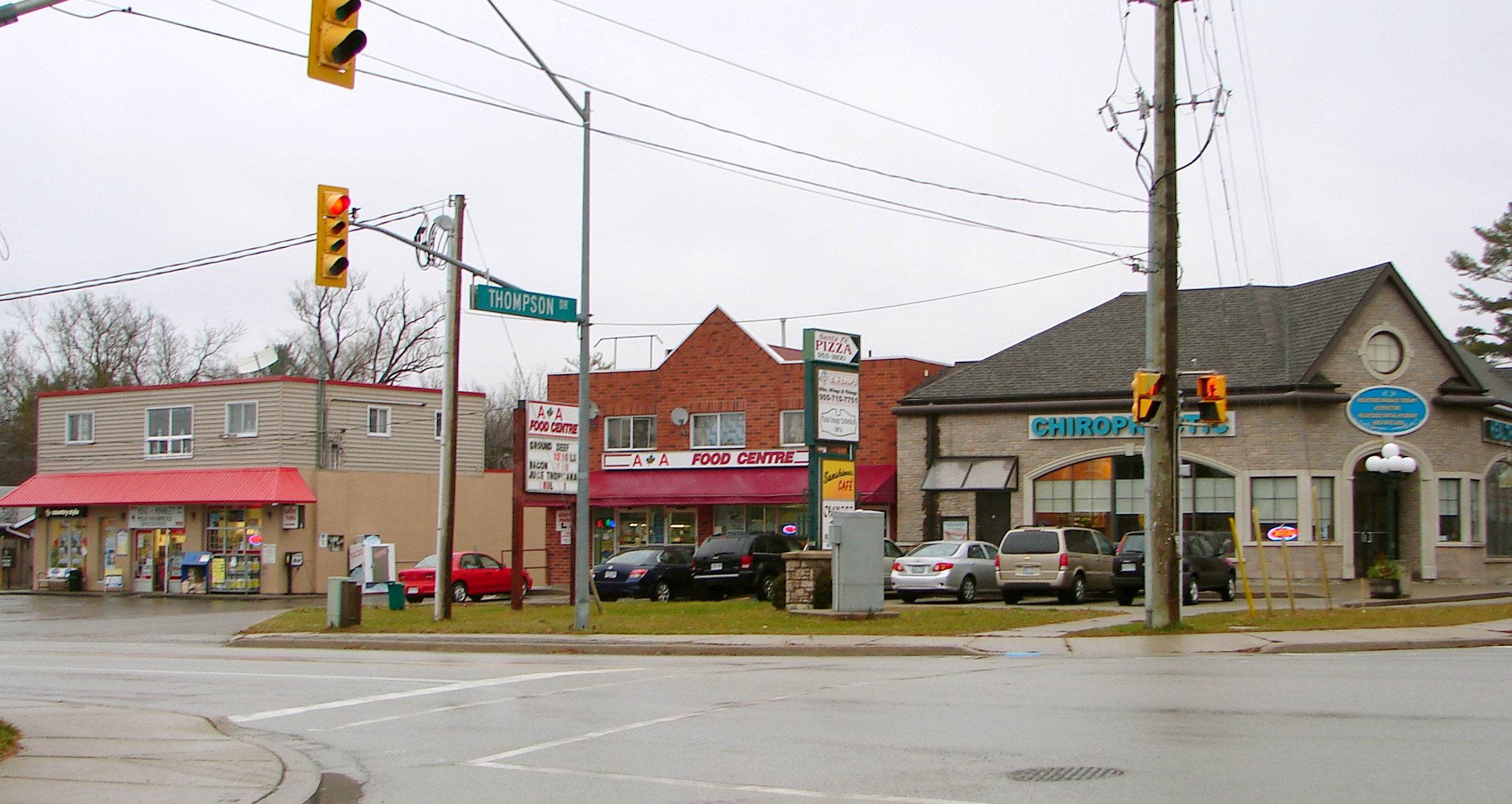

- Location in Ontario Holland Landing (Ontario)
- Coordinates: 44°05′22″N 079°29′42″W
- Country: Canada
- Province: Ontario
- Region: York
- Town: East Gwillimbury
- Time zone: UTC-05:00 (EST)
  - Summer (DST): UTC-04:00 (EDT)
- Forward sortation area: L9N
- Area codes: 905 and 289
- NTS Map: 031D03
- GNBC Code: FBOII

Holland Landing is an unincorporated community within the town of East Gwillimbury, located in the northern part of the Regional Municipality of York, in south-central Ontario, Canada. Its major road is Yonge Street (bypassed by the former Highway 11) and the community has bus service by GO Transit route 68 and York Region Transit route 52 (Monday to Saturday service). The East Gwillimbury GO train station is in the southeast corner of Holland Landing, providing weekday commuter train service. The East Holland River runs through the community and has several marinas for recreational boats. The community has a small private aerodrome, the Holland Landing Airpark, used primarily for recreational and general aviation.

Most of Holland Landing's internal economy is based on the service industry, and some manufacturing.

== History ==
In 1793, Governor John Graves Simcoe came across what would be the future site of Holland Landing, then known as St. Albans. He believed the area would make an ideal portage route and defence point between York (now Toronto) and Georgian Bay. Holland Landing was named after Samuel Holland, first Surveyor-General of British North America, who had served on HMS Pembroke, under Captain John Simcoe, father of Governor Simcoe, for whom Lake Simcoe is named.

Holland Landing was the northernmost point on the original alignment of Yonge Street. North of the town the Holland River is easily navigable, and the location was selected as a well sited inland port for Lake Simcoe, via the river. It was intended that Yonge Street, in combination with the similar Penetanguishene Road further north, would provide access to the upper Great Lakes from the city of York. Holland Landing would be a major point on this route.

However, it never served this intended role in any real capacity. The closest it came was during the War of 1812, when the British decided to retake the entire lake system through the construction of a number of first-rate ships in Kingston and Penetanguishene. A large anchor, over fifteen feet (roughly 4.6 m) long and weighing approximately 4000 lbs (about 1 816 kg), for the frigate under construction at Penetanguishene was shipped from England and had made it as far as Holland Landing when the war ended. It was abandoned and is currently on display at Anchor Park. From approximately 1833-1853, Holland Landing was a destination for steamboats carrying freight and passengers along the west branch of the Holland River. By 1845, Holland Landing had a brewery, a distillery, and multiple taverns patronized by locals and visitors from the waterway.

The town itself was not formed until the early 19th century, settled by the same Quaker immigrants as nearby Newmarket and Aurora. In 1815, a population of settlers from Selkirk, Manitoba arrived in Holland Landing after a conflict between them and the Métis.

Samuel Lount, a martyr of the 1837 Rebellion led by William Lyon Mackenzie, farmed and operated a smithy here. Lount was captured later, convicted of treason, and hanged on April 12, 1838.

The idea for a canal linking to Lake Simcoe and the Trent-Severn Waterway was approved and construction started in 1906. Holland Landing would connect Newmarket and Bradford. It was almost complete in the summer of 1912 – three lift locks, three swing bridges and a turning basin – when the new government of Robert Borden cancelled the project. The project was abandoned, earning it the name "The Ghost Canal". It continues to serve as a historical landmark.

== Demographics ==
- Population:
  - 2006: about 8,500 - estimate based on the census population of East Gwillimbury, and the town's data which indicate 41% of its residents are in Holland Landing.
  - 2015: about 9,000

== Education ==
The community has four primary schools; Holland Landing Public School (YRDSB), Park Avenue Public School (YRDSB) and Good Shepherd Catholic School (YCDSB) and École élémentaire catholique Jean-Béliveau (a French-language Catholic school). There are no higher education institutions in Holland Landing, or indeed in East Gwillimbury. Students from Holland Landing typically attend one of the high schools in Newmarket.

== Notable people ==
- Sam Bennett, ice hockey player, currently playing with the Florida Panthers of the NHL.
- Darrin Madeley, former ice hockey player, who had a brief stint with the Ottawa Senators of the NHL.
- Kevin Pangos, basketball coach and former NBA player.
- Andrew Quattrin, rugby union player on the national team.

== Nearest communities ==
- Bradford, northwest
- Queensville, northeast
- Sharon, east
- Newmarket, south
- Kettleby, southwest
- Ansnorveldt, west
- Keswick, north

== See also ==
- Schleese Saddlery, a manufacturer of English riding saddles in Holland Landing.
