= Black River (York Region) =

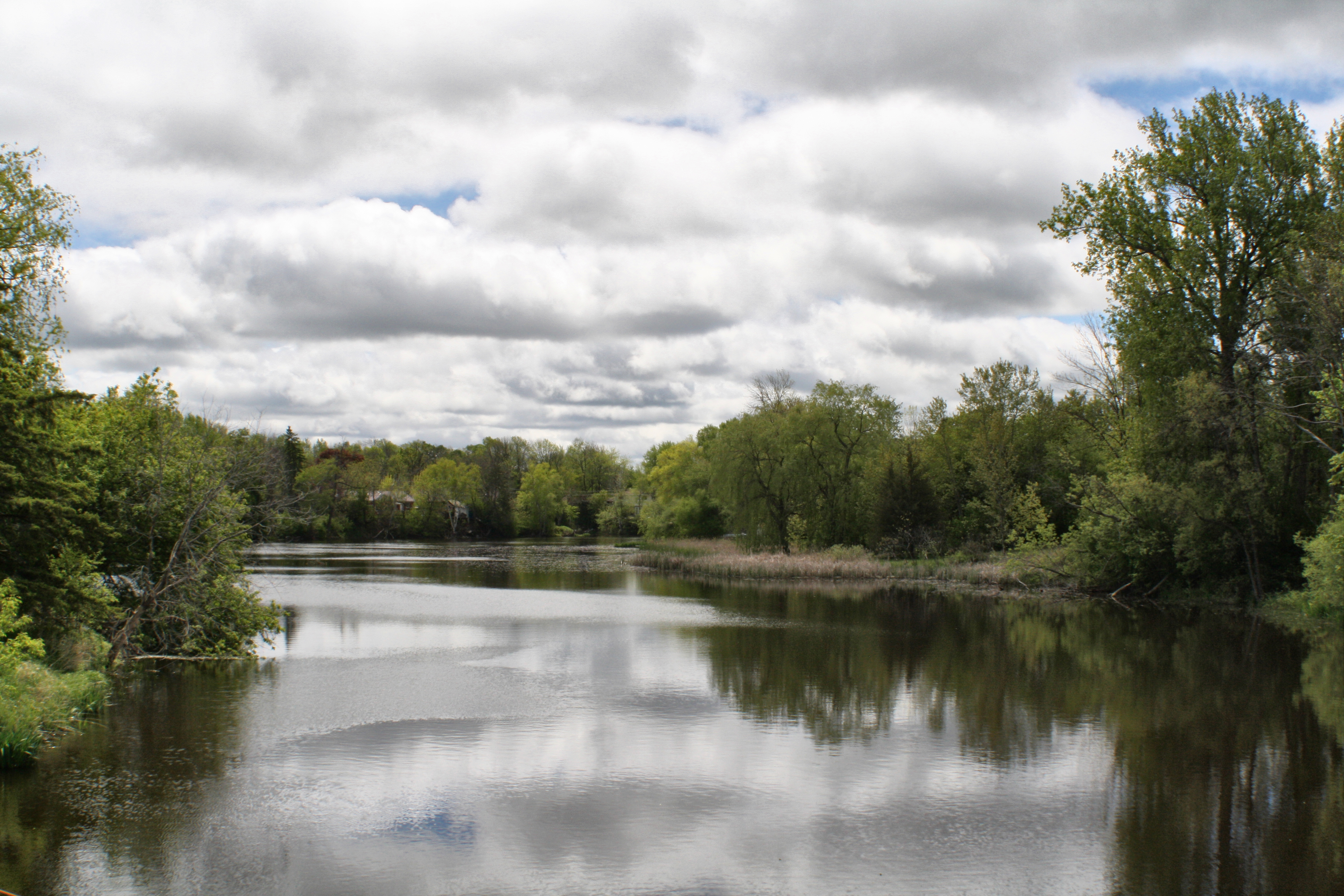
- The river at the community of Sutton

- Location of the mouth of the Black River in southern Ontario

Location
- Country: Canada
- Province: Ontario
- Region: Central Ontario
- Regional Municipalities: York; Durham
- Municipalities: Georgina; Uxbridge; East Gwillimbury

Physical characteristics
- Source: Unnamed pond
  - location: Whitchurch–Stouffville
  - coordinates: 44°03′20″N 79°20′07″W
  - elevation: 291 m (955 ft)
- Mouth: Lake Simcoe
  - location: Georgina
  - coordinates: 44°19′21″N 79°20′48″W
  - elevation: 219 m (719 ft)
- Basin size: 375 km^{2} (145 sq mi)
- Discharge
  - location: Black River at Sutton (WSC 02EC0120)
  - average: 2.61 m^{3}/s (92 cu ft/s)
  - minimum: 1.76 m^{3}/s (62 cu ft/s)
  - maximum: 3.58 m^{3}/s (126 cu ft/s)

Basin features
- River system: Great Lakes Basin

The Black River is a river in the Regional Municipality of York and the Regional Municipality of Durham in Central Ontario, Canada. It is part of the Great Lakes Basin, and is a tributary of Lake Simcoe; the entire watershed is under the auspices of the Lake Simcoe Region Conservation Authority.

== Watershed ==
The watershed is 375 square kilometres (145 sq mi) in area and the mean flow reported at the community of Sutton, which encompassed 324 square kilometres (125 sq mi) of the watershed, was 2.61 cubic metres (92.17 cu ft) (max flow 3.58 cubic metres or 126.43 cubic feet; min flow 1.76 cubic metres or 62.15 cubic feet). The mean flow at a station further upstream at the community of Baldwin, which encompassed 271.78 square kilometres (104.93 sq mi) of the watershed, was 2.2 cubic metres (78 cu ft) (max flow 3.05 cubic metres or 107.71 cubic feet; min flow 1.35 cubic metres or 47.67 cubic feet).

== Course ==
The river begins at an unnamed lake on the Oak Ridges Moraine in Whitchurch–Stouffville, York Region, near the community of Cedar Valley. It heads northwest, under the Canadian National Railway main line, and then north into East Gwillimbury, then flows northeast under Ontario Highway 48 to cross the northwestern corner of Uxbridge, Durham Region. It flows under the former Lake Simcoe Railway branch of the Toronto and Nipissing Railway, before returning to Georgina in York Region. It heads north, passes over the Baldwin Dam at the community of Baldwin, flows through the community of Sutton, and reaches its mouth at Lake Simcoe between the communities of Briars Park to the west and Mossington Park to the east. Lake Simcoe flows via Lake Couchiching and the Severn River to Lake Huron.

== Recreation ==
Baldwin Conservation Area is a 26-hectare (64-acre) conservation area on a small reservoir formed by the Baldwin Dam. The Sutton-Zephyr rail trail occupies a portion of the abandoned Lake Simcoe Railway branch of the Toronto and Nipissing Railway that crosses the Black River.

== Tributaries ==
- Zephyr Creek (right)
- Mount Albert Creek (right)
- Harrison Creek (left)

== See also ==
- List of rivers of Ontario
