= Schleese Saddlery =

Canadian saddle manufacturer

Schleese Saddlery Service Ltd. is a Canadian manufacturer of custom-fitted saddles for show-jumping and dressage. It was started in 1986 by Jochen Schleese, a German saddler, in Stouffville, Ontario.
