= Sharon, Ontario =

Sharon
- Unincorporated community
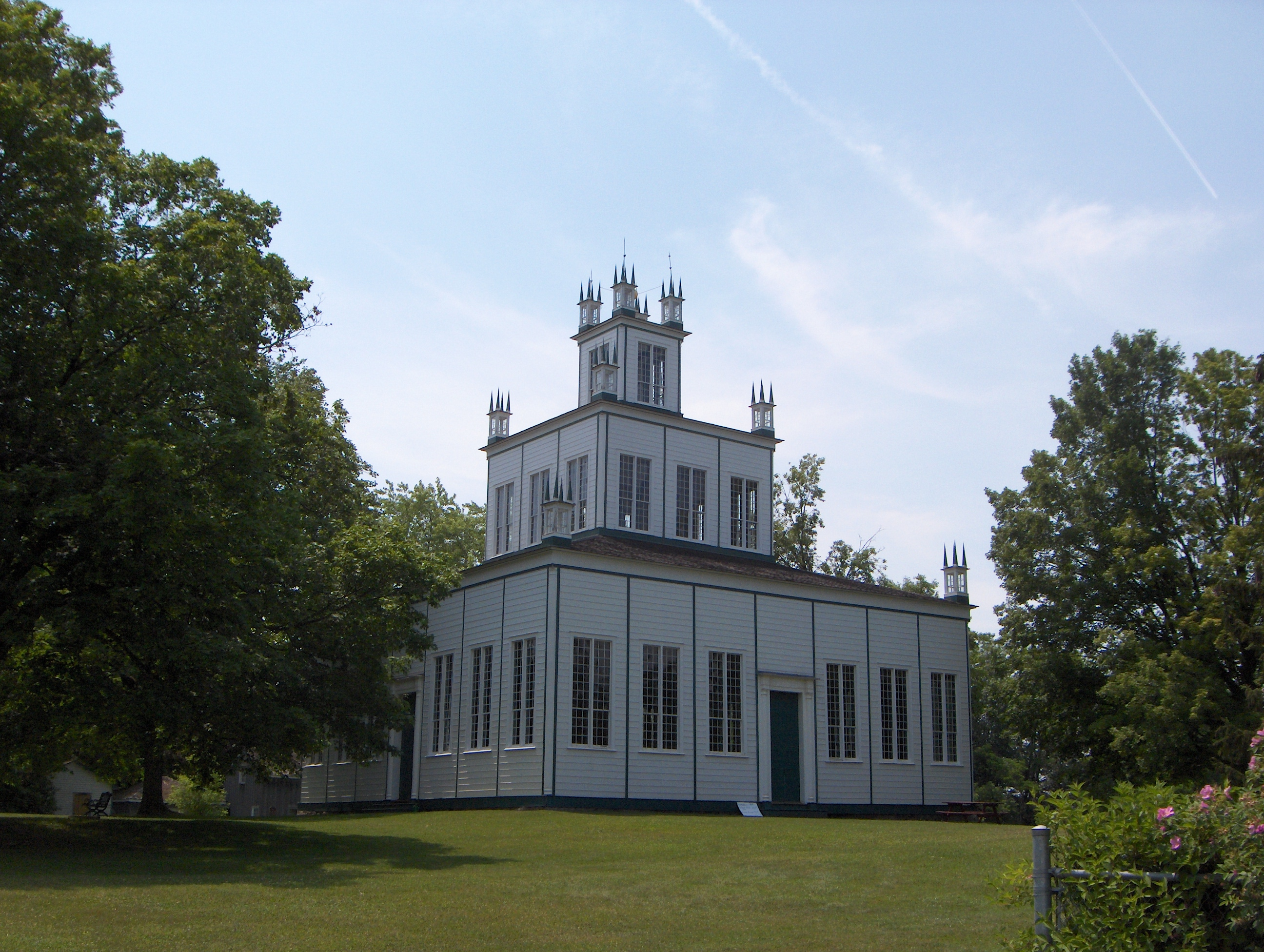
- The Sharon Temple

- Location of East Gwillimbury York Region.
- Coordinates: 44°6′22″N 79°26′4″W
- Country: Canada
- Province: Ontario
- Named for: Sharon Temple

Population
  - Estimate: 3,000
- Postal code: L0G 1V0
- Area code: 905

Sharon (formerly Hope) is a former village now incorporated into the municipality of the Town of East Gwillimbury, Ontario, Canada, formerly the Township of East Gwillimbury. The municipal offices of the town are in Sharon.

The community's most historic building is the Sharon Temple, once the meeting house of the Children of Peace (or Davidites). It is part of the musical, political, religious and architectural heritage of Ontario and is now a museum and National Historic Site of Canada. The museum hosts a number of concerts and educational programs, and has hosted the Words Alive Literary Festival since 2007.

In the mid to late 1980s, housing developments were built in the area around Sharon. Further developments have continued slowly around Sharon since 2002.

== History ==
The village of Sharon grew around the farm of David Willson (Lot 10, Second Conc.), the leader of the Quaker denomination known as the Children of Peace. The Children of Peace constructed a series of meeting houses on Willson's farm, which became the core of the utopian community they called Hope. They changed the name to Sharon in 1841 (after the Sharon Temple) to acquire a post office.

== Transportation ==
Sharon has bus service by York Region Transit (Route 50 Queensway), as well as commuter train service from GO Transit through East Gwillimbury Station in the southwestern corner of Sharon.

The area is served by Highway 404 which is accessed via the Green Lane interchange. Before 2001, the nearest interchange was a couple of kilometres south at Davis Drive in Newmarket. Plans exist to extend the highway through East Gwillimbury and further north have been completed with highway now terminating at Woodbine Avenue in Ravenshoe, Ontario.

== Surrounding communities ==
- Queensville, north
- Mount Albert, east
- Newmarket south
- Holland Landing, west

== Government ==
At a local level Sharon is located in East Gwillimbury Ward 2 and represented by two town councillors.

== See also ==
- List of communities in Ontario
