= East Gwillimbury =

- Town (lower-tier)
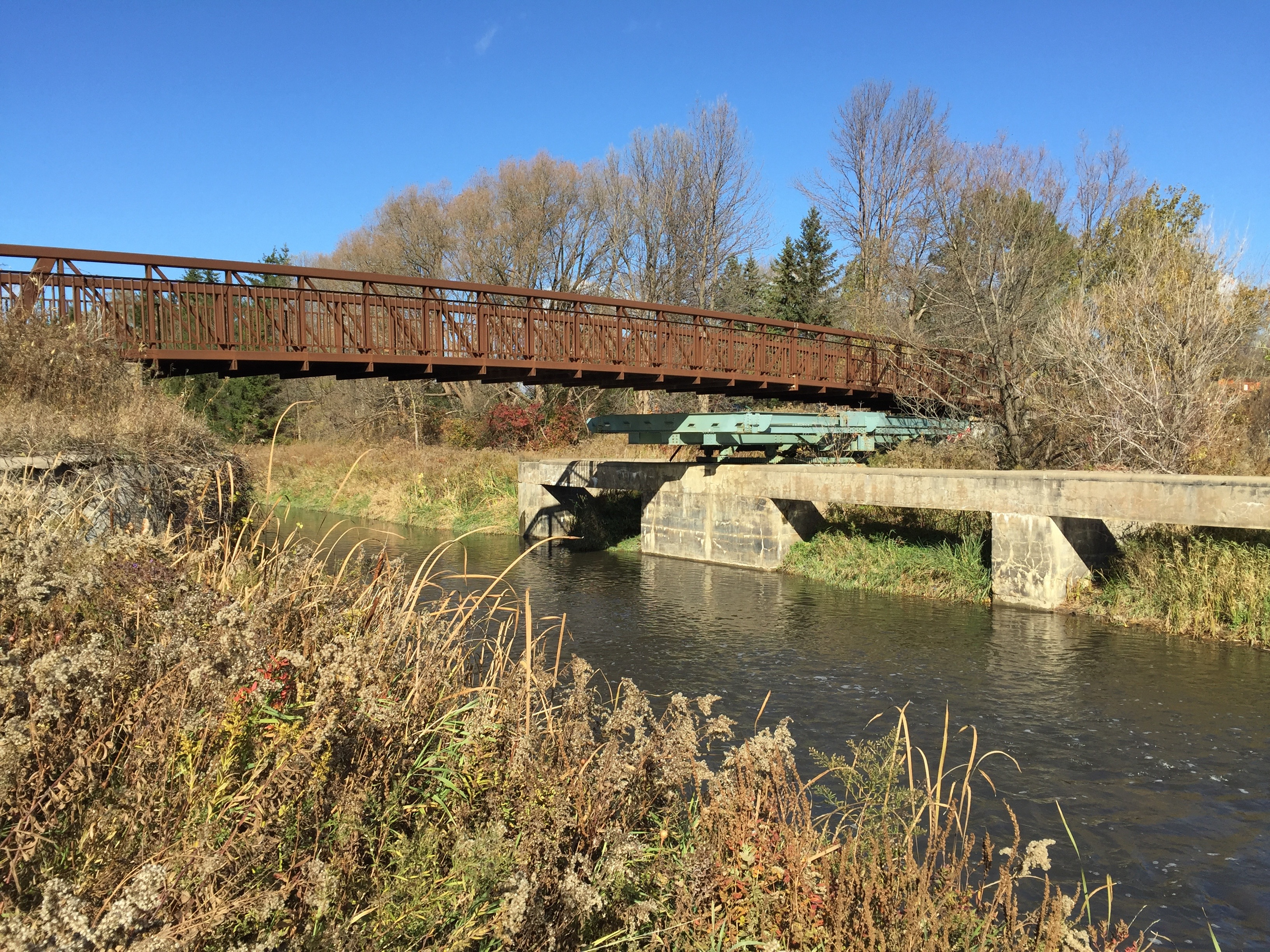

- Motto: Our Town, Our Future
- Location of East Gwillimbury York Region.

- Location within Southern Ontario
- Coordinates: 44°08′N 79°25′W
- Country: Canada
- Province: Ontario
- Regional Municipality: York Region
- Township of East Gwillimbury: 1850
- Town of East Gwillimbury: 1971

Government
  - Type: Municipality
  - Mayor: Virginia Hackson
  - Councillor: Scott Crone; Cathy Morton; Tara Roy-Diclemente; Joe Persechini; Loralea Carruthers; Terry Foster

Area
  - Total: 244.91 km^{2} (94.56 sq mi)

Population (2021)
  - Total: 34,637
  - Density: 141.4/km^{2} (366/sq mi)
  - Growth: +44.4% (2,016–2,021)
- Time zone: UTC-5 (EST)
  - Summer (DST): UTC-4 (EDT)
- Forward sortation area: L9N
- Area code: 905
- Website: www.eastgwillimbury.ca

East Gwillimbury is a town (lower-tier municipality) on the East Holland River in the upper-tier municipality the Regional Municipality of York. It is part of the Greater Toronto Area of southern Ontario, in Canada. It was formed by the amalgamation of the Township of East Gwillimbury with all the previously incorporated villages and hamlets within the township. The main centres in East Gwillimbury are the villages of Holland Landing, Queensville, Sharon, and Mount Albert. The Civic Centre (municipal offices) are located along Leslie Street in Sharon. The northernmost interchange of Highway 404 is at the North edge of East Gwillimbury, just south of Ravenshoe Road. The hamlets of Holt and Brown Hill are also within town limits.

East Gwillimbury takes its name from the family of Elizabeth Simcoe, née Gwillim, wife of Sir John Graves Simcoe, the first Lieutenant Governor of Ontario.

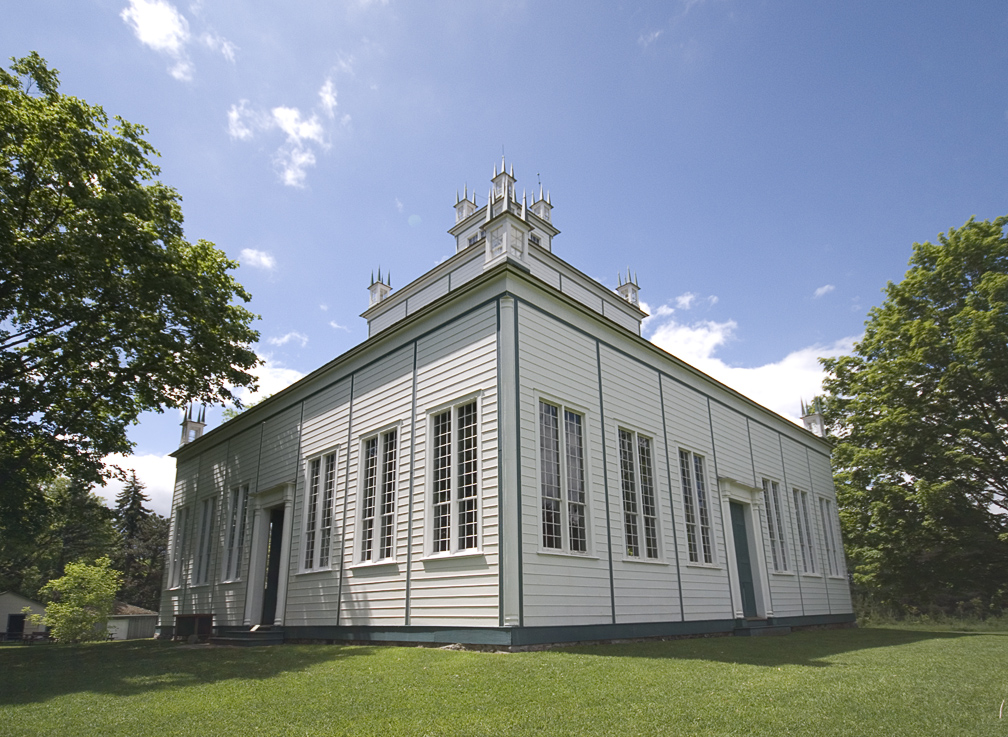
Sharon Temple

== History ==
East Gwillimbury began with the early development of Upper Canada by Lieutenant-Governor John Graves Simcoe in the late 18th century. On his order, Yonge Street was constructed from Lake Ontario to what is now the village of Holland Landing in East Gwillimbury. The areas to the north and east were named East Gwillimbury and North Gwillimbury in honour of Simcoe's wife, Elizabeth Gwillim. In 1849 the Baldwin Act incorporated the Township of East Gwillimbury effective January 1, 1850. The Province of Ontario incorporated the Town of East Gwillimbury effective January 1, 1971.

As the East Gwillimbury area grew, a number of communities developed. They were the villages or hamlets of Brown Hill, Franklin, Holland Landing, Holt (formerly Eastville), Mount Albert, Queensville (formerly colloquially known as The Four Corners), Ravenshoe, River Drive, and Sharon (formerly Hope).

In 1913, all township records were destroyed in a fire at the clerk's office in Queensville.

== Climate ==
East Gwillimbury has a humid continental climate (Köppen: Dfb).

Climate data for East Gwillimbury (Data from Buttonville Airport)
Month	Jan	Feb	Mar	Apr	May	Jun	Jul	Aug	Sep	Oct	Nov	Dec	Year
Mean daily maximum °C (°F)	−2.8 (27.0)	−1.7 (28.9)	3.8 (38.8)	11.1 (52.0)	18.6 (65.5)	23.2 (73.8)	25.8 (78.4)	25.0 (77.0)	21.2 (70.2)	13.6 (56.5)	6.6 (43.9)	0.2 (32.4)	12.0 (53.7)
Daily mean °C (°F)	−6.4 (20.5)	−5.7 (21.7)	−0.5 (31.1)	6.3 (43.3)	13.5 (56.3)	18.4 (65.1)	21.0 (69.8)	20.1 (68.2)	16.2 (61.2)	9.5 (49.1)	3.1 (37.6)	−2.7 (27.1)	7.7 (45.9)
Mean daily minimum °C (°F)	−10.5 (13.1)	−10.3 (13.5)	−4.9 (23.2)	1.8 (35.2)	8.2 (46.8)	13.4 (56.1)	15.9 (60.6)	15.3 (59.5)	11.5 (52.7)	5.6 (42.1)	−0.4 (31.3)	−5.9 (21.4)	3.3 (38.0)
Average precipitation mm (inches)	53.3 (2.10)	50.8 (2.00)	47.5 (1.87)	58.4 (2.30)	57.0 (2.24)	69.3 (2.73)	71.1 (2.80)	56.2 (2.21)	53.1 (2.09)	52.1 (2.05)	48.5 (1.91)	56.5 (2.22)	673.8 (26.52)
Source: Weather.Directory

== Government ==
The municipal council consists of a mayor elected at large and two councillors elected per ward, with the mayor also representing the town in York Regional Council. The current and recent mayors are:

Mayor	Overall Term
Virginia Hackson	2010 to present
James Young	2000 to 2010
Jim Mortson	1991 to 2000
Robert Featherstonhaugh	1985 to 1991
Angus Morton	1977 to 1985
Gladys Rolling	1970 to 1976

Virginia Hackson was elected mayor in the 2010 election, and re-elected in 2014, 2018 and 2022.

In the 2018 election, where council was elected for a four-year term, East Gwillimbury's council was elected on the basis of three wards, with two councillors from each ward. The elected councillors were Loralea Carruthers, Terry Foster, Joe Persechini, Tara Roy-Diclemente, Cathy Morton and Scott Crone.

The Federal Member of Parliament is Scot Davidson of the Conservative Party of Canada representing the riding of New Tecumseth—Gwillimbury, who was elected in a by-election on February 25, 2019. He replaced Peter Van Loan, who retired as of September 30, 2018.

The Member of Provincial Parliament is Caroline Mulroney, a member of the Progressive Conservative Party of Ontario, representing the provincial riding of York—Simcoe, who won the seat in the 2018 provincial election.

East Gwillimbury federal election results
Year	Liberal		Conservative		New Democratic		Green	
2021	33%	4,704	48%	6,859	12%	1,728	0%	9
2019	30%	4,503	46%	7,063	11%	1,636	10%	1,468

East Gwillimbury provincial election results
Year	PC		New Democratic		Liberal		Green	
2022	56%	5,898	10%	1,100	20%	2,083	8%	800
2018	56%	6,957	22%	2,703	16%	2,051	5%	609

=== Emergency services ===
There are three fire and emergency services locations, in Holland Landing, Mount Albert and Queensville. They are each staffed by a District Fire Chief and volunteer firefighters.

Police services are provided by the York Regional Police.

=== Planning ===
In March, 2006 the town council passed a policy during the Committee of the Whole Council Meeting which requires all residential developments of at least ten units to comply with Energy Star qualifications. The town's mayor described potential benefits of the program: "Energy efficient housing is the best way to ensure that East Gwillimbury's residents are insulated against rising energy costs and won't have to make costly energy efficiency upgrade retrofits in the future." The program was developed in conjunction with the development community, and stipulates "that homes in new subdivisions must — emphasis here on must — have some of the most efficient hot water, heating and air conditioning systems, be upgraded with top-rated insulation, and have draft-proof windows."

East Gwillimbury is the first jurisdiction in Canada to require Energy Star certification for residential units.

==== The 2010 Official Plan ====
In June 2010, town council passed the Official Plan for the Town of East Gwillimbury. The Official Plan was praised for its consultations with the public, developers, and other stakeholders. Designated as a future growth area under the Places to Grow Act by the Province of Ontario, East Gwillimbury will see growth from 23,000 residents in 2010, to approximately 88,400 people and 34,000 jobs by the year 2031. Despite the large amount of growth, almost 75% of East Gwillimbury land will not be developed as it is part of both the Greenbelt and the Oak Ridges Moraine. Rather than being spread out throughout the town, growth will be concentrated in the existing villages of Holland Landing, Sharon, Queensville and Mount Albert. Queensville will see the most growth, going from a population of 650 people in 2010, to over 30,000 residents. Much of the growth has been proposed since the early 1990s – however, growth in East Gwillimbury cannot occur until the York–Durham Sewage System is extended into the town, which has been postponed until 2012 or 2013, when costs are lowered. In October 2011, the Regional Municipality of York advised the Ontario Municipal Board, that they support the Official Plan for East Gwillimbury.

== Demographics ==
East Gwillimbury Historical populations
Year	Pop.	±%
1981	12,565	—
1991	18,367	+46.2%
2001	20,555	+11.9%
2006	21,069	+2.5%
2011	22,473	+6.7%
2016	23,991	+6.8%
2021	34,637	+44.4%

In the 2021 Census of Population conducted by Statistics Canada, East Gwillimbury had a population of 34,637 living in 11,449 of its 11,869 total private dwellings, a change of 44.4% from its 2016 population of 23,991. With a land area of 244.91 km^{2} (94.56 sq mi), it had a population density of 141.4/km^{2} (366.3/sq mi) in 2021.

=== Ethnicity ===
Panethnic groups in the Town of East Gwillimbury (2001−2021)
Panethnic group	2021		2016		2011		2006		2001	
Panethnic group	Pop.	%	Pop.	%	Pop.	%	Pop.	%	Pop.	%
European (Note: Statistic includes all persons that did not make up part of a visible minority or an indigenous identity.)	23,420	68.64%	20,430	87.18%	20,505	93.27%	19,805	95.75%	19,475	96.43%
East Asian (Note: Statistic includes total responses of "Chinese", "Korean", and "Japanese" under visible minority section on census.)	4,105	12.03%	850	3.63%	300	1.36%	190	0.92%	280	1.39%
Middle Eastern (Note: Statistic includes total responses of "West Asian" and "Arab" under visible minority section on census.)	1,715	5.03%	350	1.49%	50	0.23%	25	0.12%	85	0.42%
South Asian	1,620	4.75%	460	1.96%	135	0.61%	95	0.46%	35	0.17%
African	950	2.78%	340	1.45%	245	1.11%	100	0.48%	65	0.32%
Southeast Asian (Note: Statistic includes total responses of "Filipino" and "Southeast Asian" under visible minority section on census.)	695	2.04%	230	0.98%	325	1.48%	160	0.77%	40	0.2%
Latin American	520	1.52%	100	0.43%	135	0.61%	40	0.19%	15	0.07%
Indigenous	465	1.36%	455	1.94%	220	1%	160	0.77%	135	0.67%
Other/multiracial (Note: Statistic includes total responses of "Visible minority, n.i.e." and "Multiple visible minorities" under visible minority section on census.)	640	1.88%	230	0.98%	60	0.27%	120	0.58%	80	0.4%
Total responses	34,120	98.51%	23,435	97.68%	21,985	97.83%	20,685	98.18%	20,195	98.25%
Total population	34,637	100%	23,991	100%	22,473	100%	21,069	100%	20,555	100%
Note: Totals greater than 100% due to multiple origin responses

Canada 2016 Census		Population	Percent
Ethnic origin (multiple responses included); Source:	English	8,025	34.2
Ethnic origin (multiple responses included); Source:	Canadian	7,100	30.3
Ethnic origin (multiple responses included); Source:	Scottish	5,260	22.4
Ethnic origin (multiple responses included); Source:	Irish	5,200	22.2
Ethnic origin (multiple responses included); Source:	German	2,600	11.1
Ethnic origin (multiple responses included); Source:	Italian	2,045	8.7
Ethnic origin (multiple responses included); Source:	French	2,010	8.6
Ethnic origin (multiple responses included); Source:	Dutch	1,325	5.7
Ethnic origin (multiple responses included); Source:	British Isles origins, n.i.e.	950	4.1
Ethnic origin (multiple responses included); Source:	Polish	835	3.6
Ethnic origin (multiple responses included); Source:	Ukrainian	805	3.4
Ethnic origin (multiple responses included); Source:	Chinese	785	3.3
Ethnic origin (multiple responses included); Source:	First Nations	605	2.6
Ethnic origin (multiple responses included); Source:	Russian	590	2.5
Ethnic origin (multiple responses included); Source:	Welsh	550	2.3

== Attractions ==
The Sharon Temple is located in the village of Sharon, Ontario. It was designated as a National Historic Site of Canada in 1990. The site is composed of eight distinctive heritage buildings and dwellings, and houses 6,000 artifacts on a 1.8-hectare (4.4-acre) site. The Temple was constructed between 1825 and 1831 by the "Children of Peace", a Quaker sect led by David Willson, on whose property it was built.

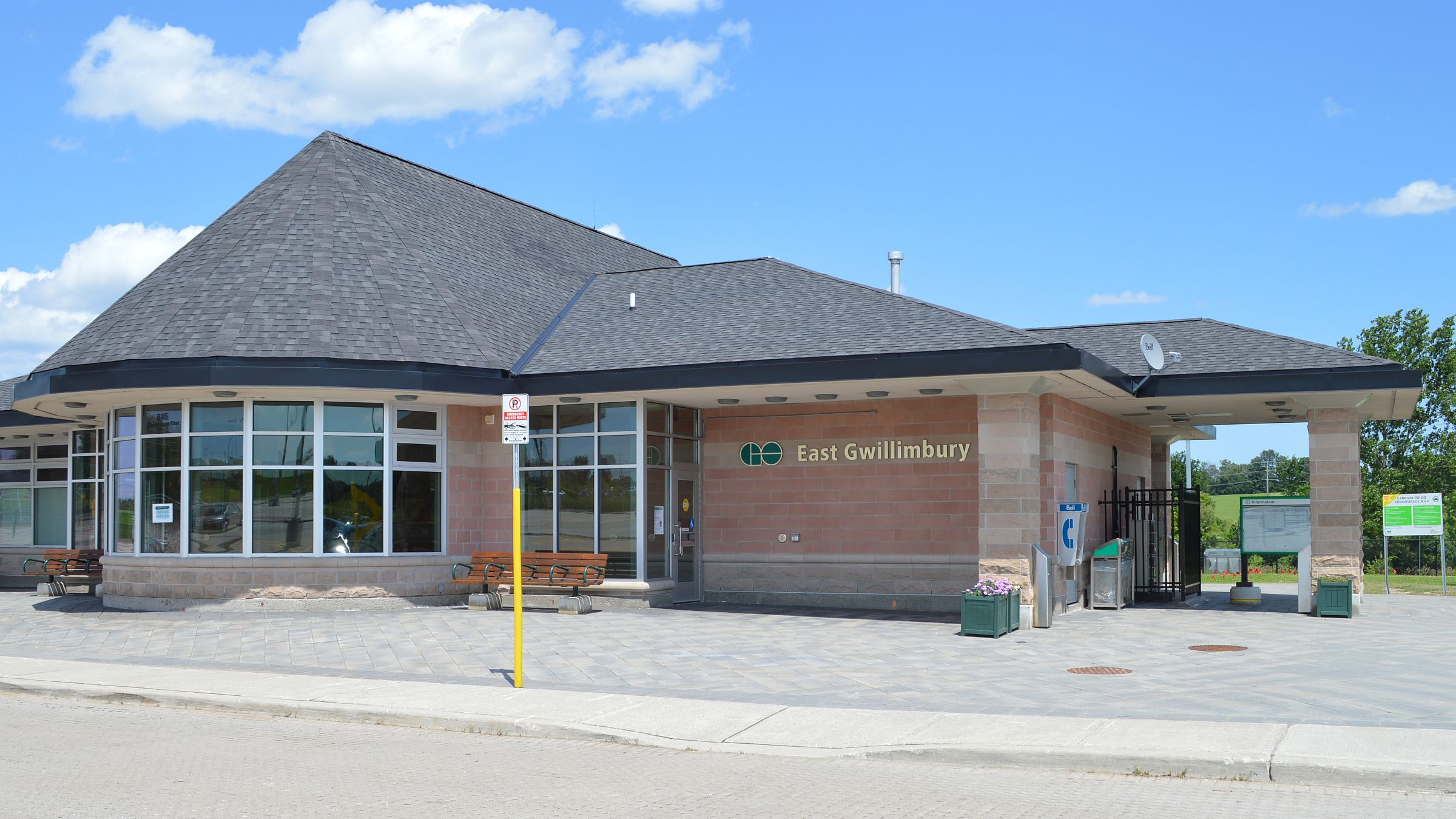
East Gwillimbury GO Station main building

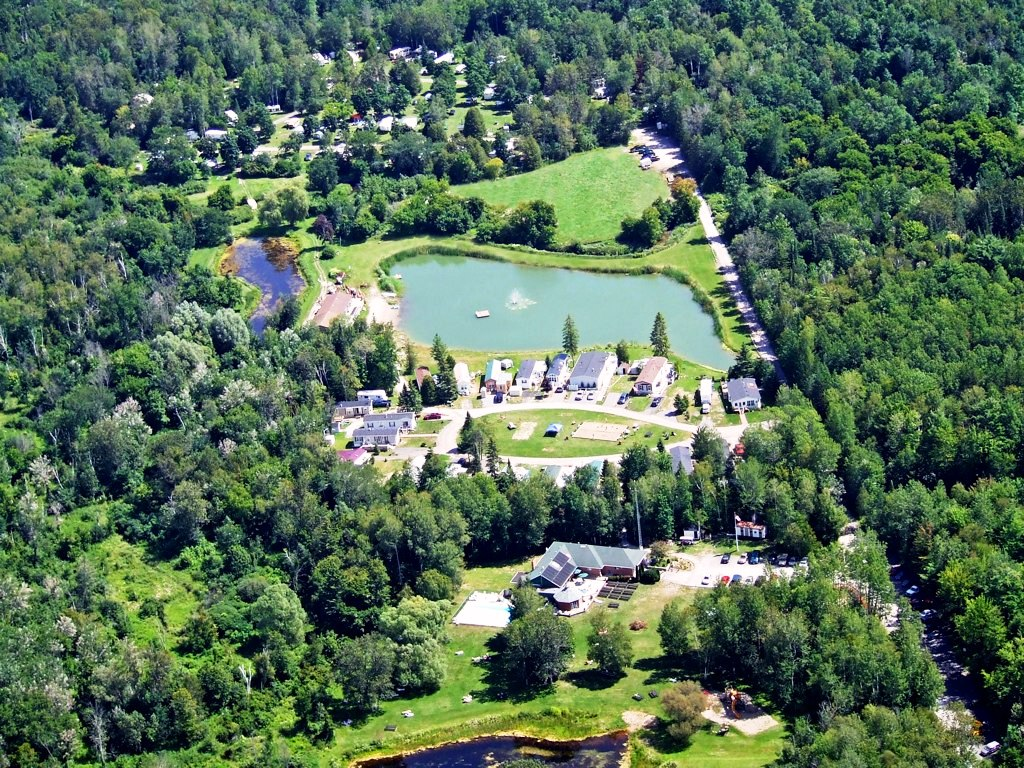
Aerial view of Bare Oaks Family Naturist Park looking east.

Bare Oaks Family Naturist Park is a naturist (nudist) park located between the villages of Sharon and Mount Albert. It attracts thousands of visitors to East Gwillimbury and has a significant economic impact on area tourism. It has been in that location since 1972 when it was known as the Toronto Helios Society.

Stardust Drive-In Theatre on Mount Albert Road opened in 1950s as North York Drive-In and is one of a handful of drive-in theatres remaining in Canada.

== Education ==
Schools in East Gwillimbury are governed by the York Region District School Board and the York Catholic District School Board. There are several elementary schools. Under the public system, the school board operates Holland Landing Public School, Park Avenue Public School, located in Holland Landing and Phoebe Gilman Public School in the Harvest Hills neighborhood. Sharon Public School, Queensville Public School and Mt. Albert Public School are located in Sharon, Queensville and Mount Albert respectively. The York Catholic District School Board operates Good Shepherd Catholic School (Holland Landing and Our Lady of Good Counsel Catholic Elementary School in Sharon). There are currently no secondary schools in East Gwillimbury, so students in Holland Landing attend Dr. John M. Denison Secondary School in Newmarket and students from Sharon, Queensville and Mount Albert attend Huron Heights Secondary School, also in Newmarket or Stouffville District Secondary School located in Whitchurch-Stouffville. Good Shepherd and Our Lady of Good Counsel students may proceed to Sacred Heart Catholic High School for secondary school. No post-secondary campuses are located in East Gwillimbury, though there are plans to bring a post-secondary institution to the Queensville area. East Gwillimbury's newest public school, Robert Munsch Public School, opened in 2014 in Mount Albert.

== Transportation ==
Local public transportation is provided by York Region Transit, who operate bus services to Sharon, Queensville, Holland Landing and Mount Albert. GO Transit also offers commuter train and bus services to Toronto through its East Gwillimbury Station on the Barrie line.

Ontario Highway 404 has been extended to just south of Keswick in the Town of Georgina, passing through East Gwillimbury. The town is served by three interchanges along Highway 404, namely Green Lane just north of Newmarket, Queensville Sideroad, and Woodbine Ave at the north end.

== Notable people ==
- William S. Beaton, former mayor of Sudbury
- Sam Bennett, NHL player with the Florida Panthers
- John Candy, actor and comedian
- Ebenezer Doan, master builder of Sharon Temple
- Samuel Lount, organizer of the 1837 Upper Canada Rebellion
- Curtis Joseph, retired NHL goalie
- Guy Paul Morin, wrongly convicted
- Brett Rheeder, mountain biker
- David Willson, founder of the Children of Peace

== See also ==
- List of townships in Ontario
