= Area codes 905, 289, 365, and 742 =

Area codes in southern Ontario, Canada

Coordinates: 43.630°N 79.839°W

Area codes 905, 289, 365, and 742 are telephone area codes in the North American Numbering Plan (NANP) for the Golden Horseshoe region that surrounds Lake Ontario in Southern Ontario, Canada. The numbering plan area (NPA) comprises (clockwise) the Niagara Peninsula, the city of Hamilton, the regional municipalities of Halton, Peel, York, Durham, and parts of Northumberland County, but excludes the City of Toronto.

The four area codes form an overlay numbering plan for the same geographic region, where area code 905 was established in October 1993 in an area code split from area code 416. When 289 was overlaid on June 9, 2001, all local calls required ten-digit dialling. On April 13, 2010, the Canadian Radio-television and Telecommunications Commission (CRTC) introduced another overlay code, area code 365, which became operational on March 25, 2013. Area code 742 was added to the overlay on October 16, 2021.

The numbering plan area surrounds the city of Toronto (area codes 416/647/437/942), leading locals to refer to the primarily suburban cities surrounding Toronto as "the 905" or "905 belt". It is bounded by the 519/226/548/382 overlay area in the west, 705/249/683 in the north, 613/343/753 in the east, and Western New York State's 716/624 area on the eastern prong of the Niagara Peninsula. The incumbent local exchange carrier is Bell Canada.

== History ==
From the 1960s, area code 905 was assigned for special call routing arrangements to Mexico City during the time when Mexico was expected to join the North American Numbering Plan. After establishing its own numbering plan with telephone country code 52, these arrangement were continued into the 1980s. The assignment of 905 was finally withdrawn by February 1, 1991.

The area code 905 was introduced on October 4, 1993 for the Golden Horseshoe, which was and still is Canada's largest toll-free calling zone. The Golden Horseshoe's explosive growth in the second half of the 20th century and the corresponding expansion of telecommunications service would have made another area code necessary in any event. However, the timetable was advanced because Canada's system of number allocation does not use number pooling as a relief measure. Instead, each competitive local exchange carrier (CLEC) is assigned blocks of 10,000 numbers, which correspond to a single three-digit prefix, for every rate centre in which it plans to offer service. Most rate centres do not need that many numbers to serve their customers. However, excess numbers cannot be reassigned elsewhere once they are assigned to a rate centre.

The problem was not as severe in the Golden Horseshoe as in the rest of Canada since numbers have tended to be used up fairly quickly. The proliferation of cell phones, pagers, fax machines, and dial-up Internet connections made it obvious that the Golden Horseshoe would need another area code. However, the timetable for relief was significantly advanced since it was not possible for number blocks to be reassigned from the Golden Horseshoe's smaller rate centres to the Toronto rate centre.

Automatic number identification (ANI) in some central office switching systems in the numbering plan area started operation on October 11, 1992. The new area code entered service on October 11, 1993. Permissive dialling of 416 continued across the Golden Horseshoe until January 1, 1994. However, portions of the 905 territory have remained ever since a local call to Toronto.

The creation of area code 905 was intended as a long-term solution. However, five years after its introduction, area code 905 was close to exhaustion far sooner than anticipated, again due to the proliferation of cell phones and pagers. By 1999, the CRTC had established an ad hoc committee to study code relief planning for area code 905. A split of the NPA was considered, with various options being presented:

- a geographic split by municipality (either two-way or three-way)
- a geographic split of concentric rings around Toronto
- a realignment of NPA boundaries
- a distributed overlay

The overlay option was chosen because it would cause the least disruption and was supported by all of the carriers. A split would have forced some customers to change their numbers for the second time in less than a decade, which would have entailed en masse reprogramming of cell phones. Additionally, an overlay was seen by this time as an easy workaround for the number allocation problem. Around the same time, Toronto was overlaid with area code 647 (and later 437).

NPA 289 was approved by the CRTC on August 15, 2000 in Order CRTC 2000–772. The order had the CRTC direct Bell Canada to implement a ten-digit local dialling plan. Permissive seven-digit or ten-digit dialling for 905-customers began on April 7, 2001, before the in-service date for 289 of June 9, 2001.

The Golden Horseshoe's continued growth caused area code 365 to be assigned for further relief on March 25, 2013. Also, area code 742 was assigned on October 16, 2021.

A numbering plan exhaust analysis of 2020 projected an exhaust date of March 2023 for the numbering plan area.

Area code 537 was reserved as a fifth area code for the region in November 2022.

== In popular culture ==
The term the 905 or the 905 belt is used to describe the suburban areas of the Greater Toronto Area, while Toronto proper is referred to as the 416. The term 905er is often used pejoratively by Toronto residents to refer to suburban residents outside the city. Canadian rapper Maestro rendered homage to the area code in his song "416/905 (TO Party Anthem)"; "TO" (pronounced "teeyo") is an abbreviation or nickname locals use when referring to the city of Toronto. In June 2015, Maple Leaf Sports & Entertainment announced the formation of an NBA Development League team for the Toronto Raptors based in Mississauga called Raptors 905.

The term has been used in the context of Canadian politics, where the 416 is a stronghold of Liberals and NDP, whereas the 905 (excluding Hamilton) historically had strong ties to the Progressive Conservative Party. The region has, however, backed opposition parties as a protest vote, including both the NDP in the 1990 provincial election and the Liberals in the 2003 provincial election, as a backlash to the incumbent government. In both cases, the opposition party was elected to government with strong backing of the 905 region. The 2011 federal election saw the 905 region become predominately represented by candidates of the Conservative Party of Canada, while one third of the 416 ridings were won by Conservatives, many through vote splitting between the Liberals and NDP. In the 2019 federal election, the Liberals successfully held all 25 ridings in the 416, which they won in 2015. However, the parties were fighting over control over the 905 as, historically, winning the 905 is key to parties forming government and the region has become a political bellwether. In the end, most 905 ridings were won by the Liberals over the Conservatives. The Liberals ultimately beat the Conservatives and formed a minority government with the support of the 905.

== Rate centres and central office codes ==
- Ajax-Pickering: (289)-200 224 229 255 275 277 314 315 372 387 388 403 417 422 423 460 482 484 533 539 545 591 608 624 631 660 733 734 744 882 892 913 915 923 980 986 987 988, (365)-275 300, (905)-231 239 250 391 409 420 421 422 423 424 426 427 428 492 509 550 619 621 622 626 683 686 706 744 767 831 837 839 903 995 999
- Aurora: (289)-221 258 380 466 552 614 648 796 802 840 879 894 984 995, (365)-500 803, (905)-222 395 503 713 717 726 727 750 751 758 841 900
- Beeton: (289)-415 899 970, (365)-560 901, (905)-724 729 748 801 909
- Bethesda: (289)-262 615, (365)-501, (905)-504 888
- Blackstock: (289)-702, (365)-408, (905)-986
- Bowmanville: (289)-223 276 513 626 703, (365)-401, (905)-419 623 697
- Bradford: (289)-464 831, (365)-266 900 (905)-551 775 778
- Brampton is divided into the following local rate centres:
  - Brampton (289)-201 233 298 323 325 401 406 410 418 498 499 505 541 544 569 632 654 720 747 748 752 764 801 864 889 900 901 946 948, (905)-216 226 230 291 450 451 452 453 454 455 456 457 458 459 460 463 487 488 494 495 497 499 500 595 598 654 759 781 782 783 789 790 791 792 793 794 796 798 799 840 846 861 863 866 867 872 874 901 965 970
  - Castlemore: (289)-324 749 916, (365)-201, (905)-200 204 794 913 915
  - Snelgrove: (289)-954, (365)-203, (905)-843 996
- Burlington: (289)-208 230 245 266 288 293 313 337 348 419 427 598 635 636 707 714 741 745 787 798 812 816 828 861 938 962 977 983, (365)-999, (905)-220 315 319 320 331 332 333 335 336 340 407 592 630 631 632 633 634 635 637 638 639 681 802
- Caledon is divided into the following local rate centres:
  - Bolton: (289)-206 461 487 503 616 651 875 906, (365)-502, (905)-533 857 951
  - Caledon: (289)-824 908 961 966, (365)-200, (905)-584 586 587 588 757 838 843 860 996
  - Palgrave: (289)-546 594, (365)-516, (905)-583 880
  - Victoria: (289)-955 967, (365)-204, (905)-838 998
- Caledonia: (289)-284 285 523 528 751 757 960, (905)-765
- Campbellville: (289)-458 630 692, (365)-304, (905)-854
- Castleton: (905)-344
- Cayuga: (289)-370 516 603 736, (905)-772
- Claremont: (289)- 462, (365)-503 650, (905)-408 490 649
- Cobourg: (289)-215 251 252 435 677 691 771 829, (365)-400, (905)-207 269 372 373 375 376 377 396
- Colborne: (289)-265, (905)-355
- Cold Springs: (905)-342
- Dunnville: (289)-209 330 331 332 369 377 381 433 518 604 738 761 972 973, (365)-651, (905)-229 701 774
- East Gwillimbury is divided into the following local rate centres:
  - Mount Albert: (289)-465 534 662, (365)-510, (905)-473 557
  - Queensville: (289)-549, (365)-529, (905)-478 589
- Fisherville: (289)-601, (905)-779
- Fort Erie is divided into the following local rate centres:
  - Fort Erie (289)-250 303 320 321 322 476 599 762 (365)-801, (905)-871 991 992 993 994
  - Ridgeway: (289)-876 (905)-894
  - Stevensville: (289)-397, (905)-382
- Garden Hill: see Port Hope
- Georgetown: (289)-344 349 428 642 694 790 839 890 891 924 935, (365)-302, (905)-702 703 873 877
- Gormley: (289)-486 746, (365)-504, (905)-284 400 534 887 927
- Grafton: (905)-349
- Grimsby: (289)-205 235 336 447 455 493 754 770 797, (905)-309 945
- Hagersville: (289)-282 283 524 758 784, (905)-768
- Hamilton is divided into the following local rate centres:
  - Ancaster: (289)-204 239 346 443 445 450 495 515 735 739 855 902, (905)-304 648
  - Binbrook: (289)-286 287 424 522 568 743 756, (905)-692
  - Dundas: (289)-238 345 446 494 517 737 753 858, (905)-627 628
  - Freelton: (289)-609 679 693, (365)-301, (905)-659
  - Hamilton: (289)-237 244 246 253 260 263 308 309 335 339 358 382 389 391 396 408 425 426 439 440 441 442 456 489 492 520 527 551 556 639 659 667 674 678 680 682 683 684 689 698 700 750 755 766 768 769 773 774 775 776 778 779 780 788 799 808 827 860 877 880 887 919 920 921 922 925 931 933 941 949 975 978 994, (365)-317 888, (905)-218 253 296 297 308 312 314 317 318 379 381 383 385 387 388 389 390 393 481 496 512 515 516 517 518 519 520 521 522 523 524 525 526 527 528 529 531 536 537 538 540 541 543 544 545 546 547 548 549 560 561 570 572 573 574 575 577 578 581 645 661 667 719 730 741 745 746 769 777 807 818 865 869 870 902 906 912 920 921 923 928 929 961 962 963 966 971 972 973 974 975 977 978 979 981
  - Mount Hope: (289)-280 281 491 525 759 791 866, (905)-679
  - Stoney Creek: (289)-203 448 490 526 656 760 765 792 965, (905)-594 636 662 664 930
  - Waterdown: (289)-352 431 619 718 767 895, (905)-689 690
  - Winona: (289)-649 794, (905)-643
- Hampton: (289)-706, (365)-403, (905)-263 445
- Keswick: (289)-528, (365)-505, (905)-476 535 656 700 989
- King Township is divided into the following local rate centres:
  - King City: (289)-207 467 530 618 621 874 907, (365)-506, (905)-539 833
  - Nobleton: (289)-463 542 620 658 664, (365)-514, (905)-558 859
  - Schomberg: (289)-318 557 592, (365)-520, (905)-590 939
- The Town of Lincoln is divided into the following local rate centres:
  - Beamsville: (289)-432 566 602, (905)-563
  - Vineland: (289)-567 605, (905)-562
- Markham is divided into the following local rate centres:
  - Markham: (289)-301 306 307 378 451 469 507 554 661 666 800 818 846 859 872, (365)-509 654 655, (905)-201 202 205 209 294 350 471 472 554 910
  - Thornhill: (289)-390 459 472 502 510 514 561 588 597 695 807 843 857 982, (365)-523, (905)-326 370 418 482 530 532 593 597 660 669 695 707 709 731 738 739 747 760 761 762 763 764 771 879 881 882 886 889 907
  - Unionville: (289)-333 392 473 563 577 584 789 806 844 884, (365)-525, (905)-248 258 300 305 307 316 413 415 470 474 475 477 479 480 489 513 604 752 754 917 940 943 944 946 947 948 968 969
- Milton: (289)-230 270 350 409 412 429 627 655 670 728 862 851 878 930 971, (365)-303 355, (905)-299 462 514 636 691 693 699 749 805 864 875 876 878
- Mississauga is divided into the following local rate centres:
  - Clarkson: (289)-299 326 373 420 628 727 825 826 849 898 945, (365)-279 579 627 765 850, (742)-246 303, (905)-254 403 491 822 823 855 916 919
  - Cooksville: (289)-232 261 327 360 362 374 421 444 454 497 521 565 628 633 722 724 777 785 805 883 951, (365)-207 288 465 580 683 708 748, (742)-245 583, (905)-206 210 212 214 219 232 238 241 247 267 268 270 272 273 275 276 277 279 281 282 283 290 306 361 366 402 501 502 507 566 568 602 614 615 624 625 629 712 755 756 766 803 804 848 890 896 897 949
  - Malton: (289)-247 328 359 384 548 562 623 625 721 729 804 865 904 944 988, (365)-382 581 628 665 684 722 904, (742)-243, (905)-234 255 256 293 298 362 364 405 461 564 565 612 670 671 672 673 676 677 678 694 696 698 740 795 908 956
  - Port Credit: (289)-297 329 643 822 847 953, (365)-202 242 280 531 582 629 851 865, (742)-277, (905)-221 271 274 278 486 891 990
  - Streetsville: (289)-290 305 334 375 457 540 652 719 726 814 848 896 914 957 997 998 999, (365)-220 281 565 584 630 645 656 709 852 975, (742)-244 300 532, (905)-236 285 286 288 301 302 363 369 412 542 567 569 593 600 601 603 606 607 608 609 785 812 813 814 816 817 819 820 821 824 826 828 858 997
- Newcastle: (289)-629 708, (365)-404, (905)-446 987
- Newmarket: (289)-231 264 279 319 338 340 366 383 395 453 470 500 504 535 663 716 730 763 803 841 903 909 926 934, (365)-340 512, (905)-235 251 252 392 657 710 715 716 806 830 836 853 868 895 898 952 953 954 955 960 967
- Newtonville: (289)-709 964, (365)-405, (905)-786
- Niagara Falls: (289)-248 257 271 292 294 296 302 341 361 402 477 547 932, (365)-666, (905)-262 295 351 353 354 356 357 358 371 374 394
- Niagara-on-the-Lake: (289)-272 413 646 672 868, (365)-667, (905)-468
- Oakville: (289)-218 219 242 243 259 291 295 300 351 363 386 400 430 529 644 681 715 725 740 772 795 813 815 817 834 835 837 838 856 881 885 888 863 910 936 937 940 952 981 993, (365)-777, (905)-208 257 287 330 334 337 338 339 399 464 465 466 467 469 483 484 510 580 582 599 616 617 618 808 815 825 827 829 842 844 845 847 849 901
- Orono: (289)-710, (365)-406, (905)-485 983
- Oshawa: (289)-222 240 254 274 312 316 355 356 385 404 405 481 512 600 634 658 671 675 676 685 688 701 712 731 830 869 886 918 927 928 939 943 979 991 992 996, (365)-800, (905)-213 215 233 240 242 243 244 245 259 260 261 404 410 429 431 432 433 434 435 436 438 439 440 441 442 443 447 448 449 498 571 576 579 644 674 675 718 720 721 723 725 728 743 809 914 922 924 925 926
- Pelham: (289)-650 897, (905)-892
- Port Colborne: (289)-478 836, (905)-834 835
- Port Hope is divided into the following local rate centres:
  - Garden Hill: (905)-797
  - Port Hope: (289)-436, (905)-800 885
- Port Perry: (289)-225 354 485 653 713 912, (365)-407, (905)-982 985
- Richmond Hill is divided into the following local rate centres:
  - Oak Ridges: (289)-210 234 471 543 573 665 854, (365)-515, (905)-223 313 398 505 506 559 773
  - Richmond Hill: (289)-269 317 353 379 399 452 475 496 506 537 538 550 637 666 699 809 819 833 842 867, 870, 947, (905)-224 237 292 508 737 770 780 784 787 881 883 884 918
- Roseneath: (905)-352
- Selkirk: (905)-776
- St. Catharines-Thorold is divided into the following local rate centres:
  - Port Robinson: (289)-376, (905)-384
  - St. Catharines-Thorold: (289)-213 214 219 228 241 267 273 362 364 398 407 434 438 460 479 501 606 668 669 686 687 690 696 697 723 781 782 783 786 929 931 968 969 974 990, (365)-383 653 668 880, (905)-225 227 228 246 280 321 322 323 324 325 327 328 329 341 345 346 347 348 359 360 378 380 397 401 641 646 650 651 658 680 682 684 685 687 688 704 708 931 932 933 934 935 937 938 941 964 980 984 988
- Stouffville: (289)-212 508 558 612 617 853, (365)-521, (905)-591 640 642
- Sutton: (289)-559 576 871, (365)-522, (905)-596 722
- Toronto (former Pickering Township only): (905)-509
- Tottenham: (289)-850, (365)-540 (905)-406 936
- Uxbridge: (289)-394 564 595 640 852, (365)-444 526, (905)-852 862 904
- Vaughan is divided into the following local rate centres:
  - Kleinburg: (289)-202 216 531 873, (365)-507, (905)-552 893
  - Maple: (289)-217 304 342 357 463 468 532 553 832 917 963, (365)-508, (905)-303 417 553 585 653 832
  - Woodbridge: (289)-236 245 256 268 371 393 474 536 596 622 641 657 845, (365)-527, (905)-264 265 266 417 605 652 663 850 851 856 893 553
- Wainfleet: (905)-899
- Welcome: (905)-753
- Welland: (289)-347 414 449 480 488 673 820 821 823, (365)-652, (905)-414 714 732 733 734 735 736 788
- West Lincoln: (289)-560 793 956, (905)-957
- Whitby is divided into the following local rate centres:
  - Brooklin: (289)-227 645 704, (365)-402, (905)-425 620 655
  - Whitby: (289)-220 278 483 509 638 717 732 893 985 989, (905)-217 430 444 493 556 665 666 668

== See also ==
- List of Ontario area codes
- List of North American Numbering Plan area codes

Ontario area codes: 416/437/647/942, 519/226/548/382, 613/343/753, 705/249/683, 807, 905/289/365/742
	North: 705	
West: 519/226/548	905/289/365/742	East: 613/343, 716
	South: 716, 585, Lake Ontario	
New York area codes: 212/332/646, 315/680, 363/516, 518/838, 585, 607, 631/934, 624/716, 347/718/929, 329/845, 914, 917
