= Queensville, Ontario =

Queensville
- Unincorporated community
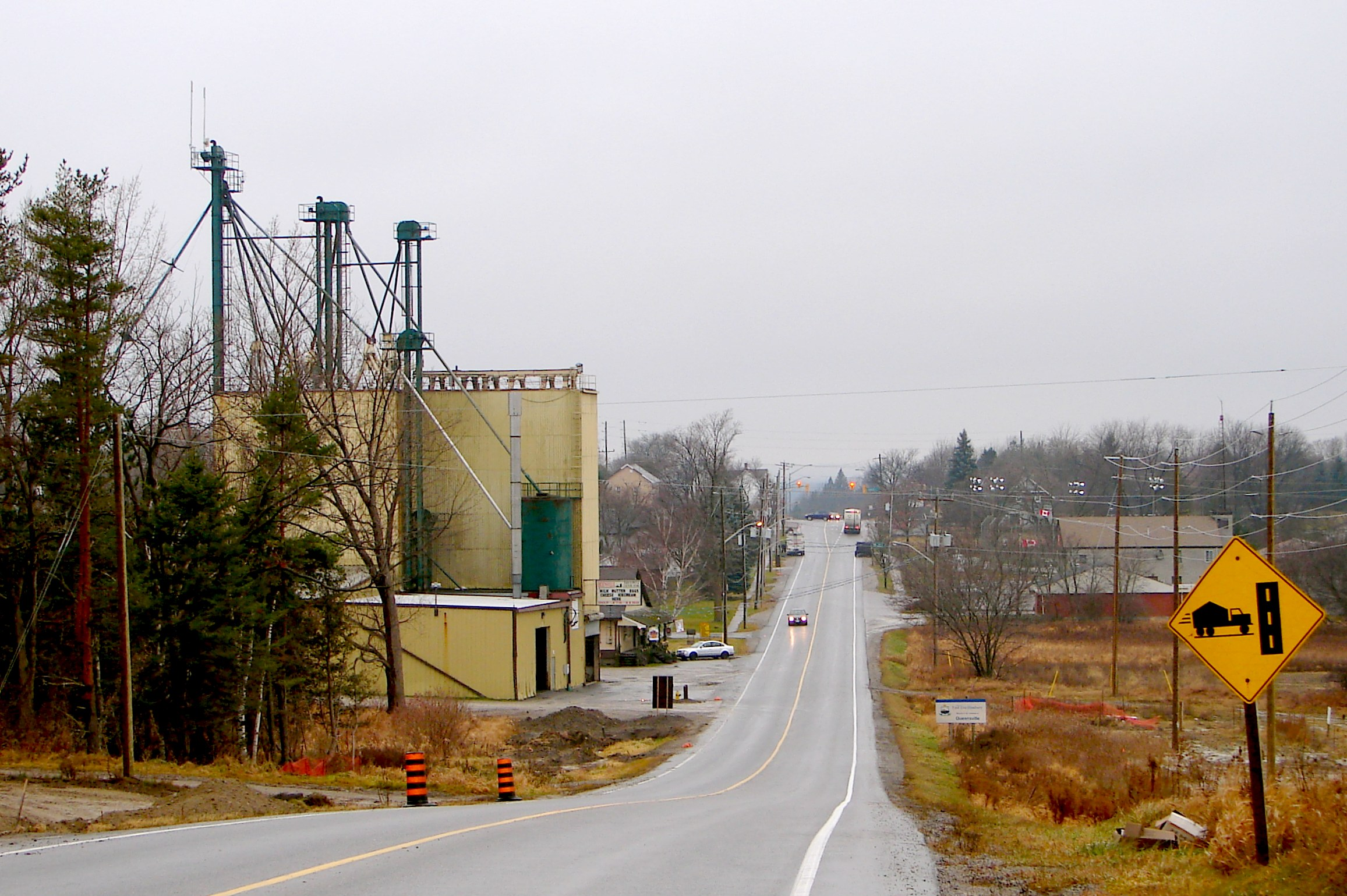
- Interactive map of Queensville
- Coordinates: 44°8′19″N 79°27′1″W
- Country: Canada
- Province: Ontario
- Regional municipality: York
- Town: East Gwillimbury
- Time zone: UTC-5 (EST)
  - Summer (DST): UTC-4 (EDT)
- Forward sortation area: L0G
- Area codes: 905 and 289
- NTS Map: 31D3 Newmarket
- GNBC Code: FCJBR

Queensville is a village within the Town of East Gwillimbury, Ontario, Canada.

== History ==
Originally named Four Corners and Hackett's Corners (after William Hackett owner of a general store), it was renamed as Queensville in 1843 to honour Queen Victoria.

== Overview ==
Among the private homes, the village proper contains the Queensville Cemetery, a post office, a United Church of Canada, and a complex containing a fire hall, a community centre, a public park with softball diamond, tennis courts and playground. Queensville is also home to a JK-6 elementary school, Queensville P.S., which was built in 1921. Guy Paul Morin and Christine Jessop were neighbours in Queensville in 1984, and John Candy once owned a home approximately 1 km south of Queensville.

At one time, there were plans to build Ontario's first private university in Queensville. The site for the proposed university would have been east of Leslie on the north side of Queensville side road. It was expected that the university would occupy 65 acres (0.102 sq mi; 0.26 km^{2}) and employ 1,000 people.

Queensville was home to the largest antique mall in York Region. The mall closed in the fall of 2019.

In 2026, a new recreation complex opened in Queensville called the "Health and Active Living Plaza". The recreation complex features an aquatic centre, a teaching kitchen, and a Queensville branch location of the East Gwillimbury Public Library.

== Geography ==
Statistics Canada 2006 census population for all of East Gwillimbury 21,069.

- Population approximately 3% of total East Gwillimbury population 632
- Name of inhabitants: - Queensvillians

=== Surrounding communities ===
- Holland Landing, to the west
- Keswick, to the north
- Mount Albert, to the east
- Sharon, to the south

== Notable natives and resident ==
- Christine Jessop, notable homicide victim murdered in 1984.
- John Candy, had a residence with his family in the early 1980’s.

== See also ==
- Royal eponyms in Canada

== See also ==
- Royal eponyms in Canada
