= Mount Albert, Ontario =

Mount Albert
- Unincorporated community
- Interactive map of Mount Albert
- Coordinates: 44°8′3″N 79°18′21″W
- Country: Canada
- Province: Ontario
- Regional municipality: York
- Town: East Gwillimbury
- Time zone: UTC-5 (EST)
  - Summer (DST): UTC-4 (EDT)
- Forward sortation area: L0G
- Area codes: 905 and 289
- NTS Map: 031D03
- GNBC Code: FCEZX

Mount Albert is a village located within the Town of East Gwillimbury and is part of York Region. It is located 65 km north-east of Toronto, 21 km south of Sutton, 45 km west-southwest of Beaverton and 30 km north of Markham. Mount Albert is accessible by Highway 404 and Highway 48.

The population is currently about 4,900. Housing developments are slowly continuing north and south of the village. The downtown area is centred at Centre Street and Main Street. The town itself is bordered on the west by Highway 48, which connects Markham and Sutton, on the east by Durham Regional road 30, which serves as the townline between East Gwillimbury and Uxbridge, Doane road to the north and Herald road to the south. Vivian Creek passes through Mount Albert. The outlying area is forested mainly by private woodlots and some regionally owned and maintained pine forests while farmlands are found throughout the area. The major industry is farming (livestock, feed, and potatoes).

== Nearest communities ==
- Holt, Ontario, west
- Musselman Lake, south
- Newmarket, south-west
- Sharon, west
- Sutton, north
- Uxbridge, south-east
- Zephyr, north-east

== Geography ==
- Population: About 4,900
- Name of inhabitants: Mounties, Mount Albertarians

== History ==
The establishment of what is now Mount Albert began in the early 19th century, when land in the area was granted by the Crown to friends of the Family Compact, the governing council of Upper Canada. In 1821, Samuel and Rufus Birchard, Quakers from Vermont, bought parcels of land, and by 1850, a village had developed. Originally, the settlement was called Birchardville. The name was later changed to Mount Albert, named after then Prince Albert, Prince of Wales (later Edward VII) son of Queen Victoria and Prince Albert of Saxe-Coburg-Gotha, in honour of his visit to Upper Canada in 1860. Industries were primarily agricultural, with grist, flour, woollen and lumber mills located along the Mount Albert Creek. The first known store was built in 1850 to supply dry goods to the villagers and surrounding farmers. The main north-south road in the village, Centre Street, was built along the path of an Algonquin Indian trail.

Housing developments slowly expanded the original village in the mid-to-late 20th century, beginning in the 1970s in the south and east quadrants. More development began in the late 1990s expanding to lands north west of the heart of Mount Albert. This subdivision was first established in 1995, with the third phase still under construction as of 2016 in the north east. A smaller development began in the south west in 2009.

Children were originally schooled in two local Grammar Schools, one to the north, and one south of the village. A public school opened in 1890 on Centre Street, and served the surrounding community until 1968. The Ross Family Complex now stands on the former school grounds. A continuation school was constructed in 1926 and taught public school graduates until 1948 when students were bused to Newmarket High School. Mount Albert Public School opened in 1967, housing Kindergarten to Grade 8. Robert Munsch Public School opened in September 2014, and services JK to grade 3, while Mount Albert Public School continues with grades 4 to 8. Mount Albert students are now primarily bused to Huron Heights Secondary School in Newmarket.

Brooks Farms (A farm in Ontario) is also located in Mount Albert.

== See also ==
- List of unincorporated communities in Ontario
- Royal eponyms in Canada
