= Ontario Highway 404 =

Controlled-access highway in Ontario

Highway 404
- Highway 404 highlighted in red

Route information
- Maintained by Ministry of Transportation of Ontario
- Length: 50.1 km (31.1 mi)
- Existed: 1977–present

Major junctions
- South end: Highway 401 / Don Valley Parkway – Toronto
- 407 ETR – Markham; Regional Road 7 (Highway 7) – Richmond Hill, Markham
- North end: Regional Road 8 (Woodbine Avenue) – East Gwillimbury

Location
- Country: Canada
- Province: Ontario

Highway system
- Ontario provincial highways; Current; Former; 400-series
← Highway 403	→ Highway 405

King's Highway 404 (pronounced "four-oh-four"), also known as Highway 404 and colloquially as the four-oh-four, is a north–south 400-series highway in the Canadian province of Ontario. As the continuation of the municipal Don Valley Parkway (DVP) north of Highway 401, it connects Toronto with East Gwillimbury. The 50.1-kilometre (31.1 mi) controlled-access freeway also connects with Highway 407 in Markham and the Don Valley Parkway in North York and Toronto, which formed the northeastern ring road of the Greater Toronto Area until the opening of Highway 412 in 2016. Highway 404 provides access to the eastern edge of Richmond Hill, Aurora and Newmarket and the western edge of Whitchurch-Stouffville, in addition to the southern edge of Keswick.

Metro Toronto (Metro) completed the Don Valley Parkway (DVP) to Sheppard Avenue in 1966. Metro initially planned extension of the DVP to Steeles Avenue, northward the province would continue the route which was inaugurated as Highway 404. However, the province ending up decided that their new highway would also run south of Steeles, incorporating the existing segment of the Metro-built DVP between Sheppard and Highway 401. The first section south of Steeles opened in 1977, over what was formerly Woodbine Avenue. Over the next twelve years, the Ministry of Transportation of Ontario (MTO) undertook a continuous construction program to extend the highway to Davis Drive in Newmarket. This was completed on October 24, 1989. The route has undergone a periodic series of smaller extensions and widening in the years since, now travelling a further 15.5 km (9.6 mi) north to Woodbine Avenue near Ravenshoe Road in the town of East Gwillimbury. It has been proposed to further extend the freeway to southeast of Beaverton.

Highway 404 is one of several freeways in the Greater Toronto Area (GTA) with High-Occupancy Vehicle (HOV) lanes; the southbound lane was one of the initial projects in the province and opened on December 13, 2005. The northbound lane opened on July 23, 2007.

The speed limit is 110 km/h (68 mph). The route is patrolled by the Ontario Provincial Police (OPP) and maintained by the Ministry of Transportation of Ontario (MTO).

== Route description ==
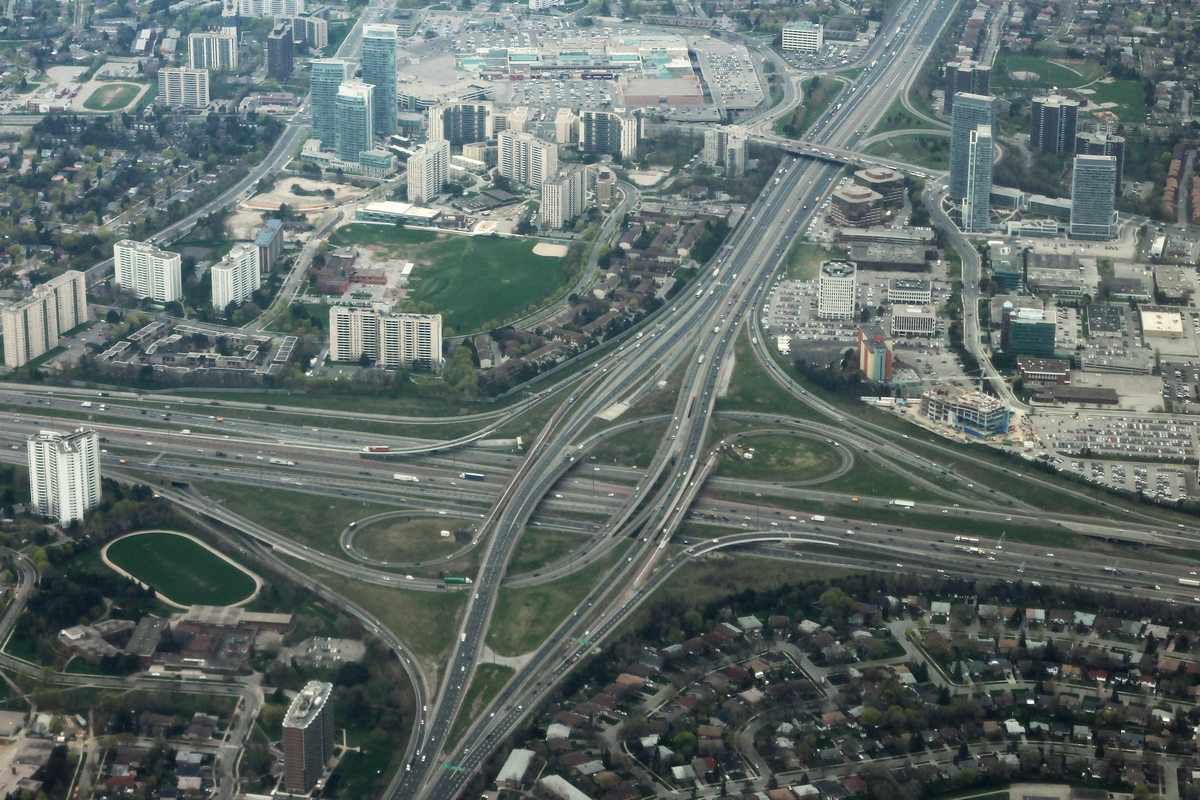
Aerial photograph of the Don Valley Parkway / Highway 404 / Highway 401 interchange

Running parallel to Highway 400 approximately 15 kilometres (9.3 mi) to the east, Highway 404 extends 50.1 km (31.1 mi) on a north–south orientation between Highway 401 and Woodbine Avenue. There are 16 interchanges along its length, mostly of the Partial cloverleaf A4 configuration. Exit numbers on the freeway start at 17, suggesting that the length of the Don Valley Parkway was considered in distance calculations; until 2017, there were no exit numbers posted on the DVP.

A continuation of the municipal-controlled DVP, the Ministry of Transportation of Ontario (MTO) jurisdiction over the freeway begins as the opposing directions of travel diverge south of the Highway 401 interchange. (Note: This demarcation line is visible on the highway as a change in pavement quality and the use of different high-mast lighting) Northbound, two lanes from the DVP are joined by a third from the eastbound collectors of Highway 401. These narrow to two lanes before merging with a single lane from westbound Highway 401 immediately south of Sheppard Avenue. An additional two lanes from eastbound Highway 401 converge and form a separate carriageway with no access to Sheppard. Southbound, the freeway is divided into two carriageways, both of which provide access to the DVP. The outer carriageway also provides access from Sheppard and to both directions of Highway 401, including the westbound express lanes, while the inner carriageway is intended for DVP-bound traffic. The HOV lane eventually merges with DVP-bound traffic, and also has an off-ramp via a tunnel to the Highway 401 westbound collector lanes. To the east of Highway 404 is the Consumers Road office park. To the west and north of Sheppard Avenue is Fairview Mall, which has its own connection with the southbound lanes attached to the Sheppard interchange.

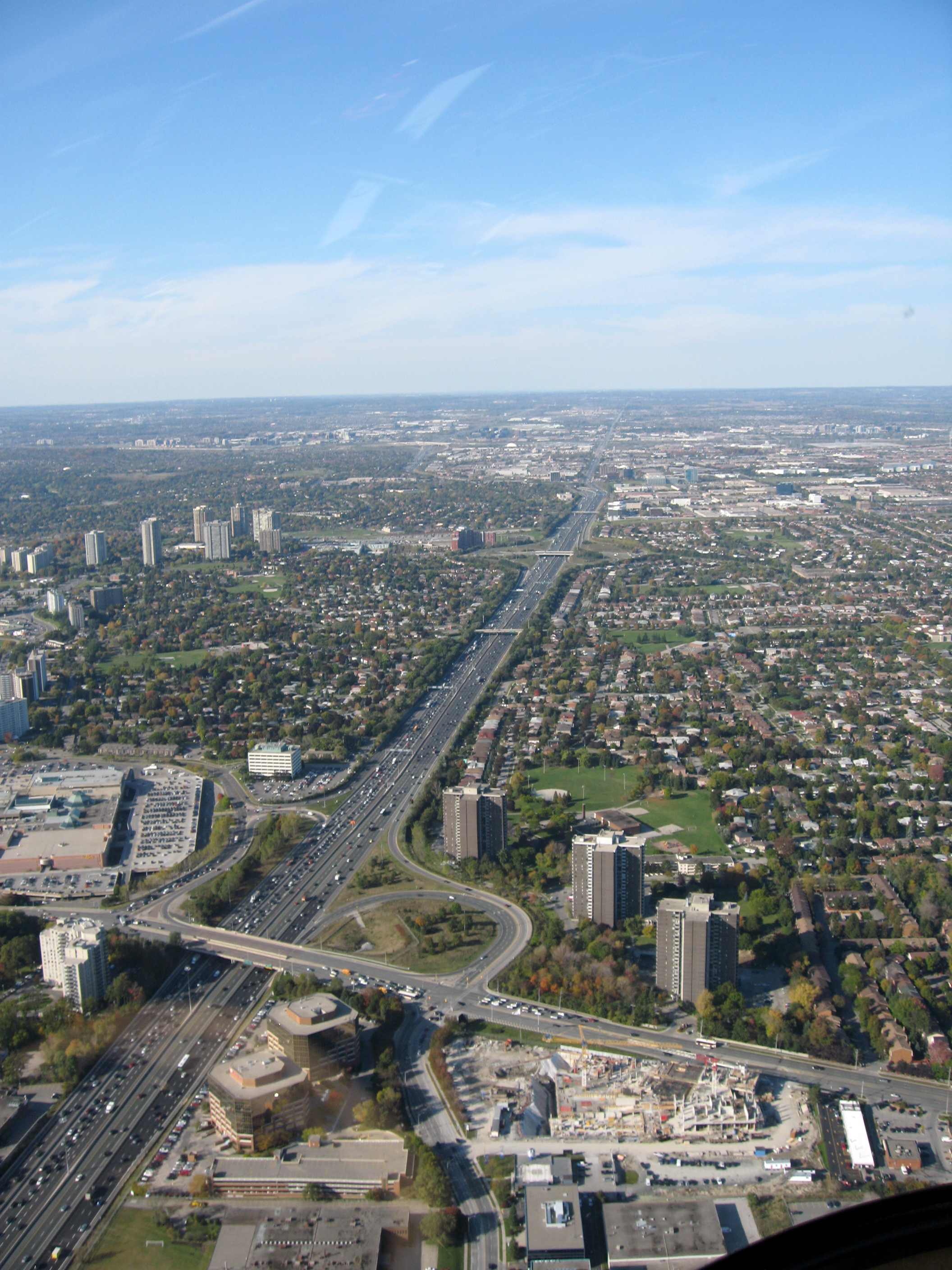
Highway 404 looking north just north of the Highway 401 / Don Valley Parkway interchange, showing the interchange with Sheppard Avenue, with Fairview Mall and Consumers Road office park on the west and east sides of the freeway, respectively.

The highway continues directly north along the old Woodbine Avenue right-of-way to just south of Steeles Avenue. This section of the freeway is five lanes per direction (four general purpose lanes, one HOV lane near the central median), plus an auxiliary lane that emerges from an on-ramp of one interchange and then diverges at an off-ramp of the next interchange. Southbound, the HOV lane continues to the interchange at Highway 401. From just north of the Van Horne Avenue overpass, the leftmost northbound lane becomes an HOV lane. Alongside Highway 404 to the east is an industrial warehouse and commercial office area, while on the west is a suburban subdivision of North York.

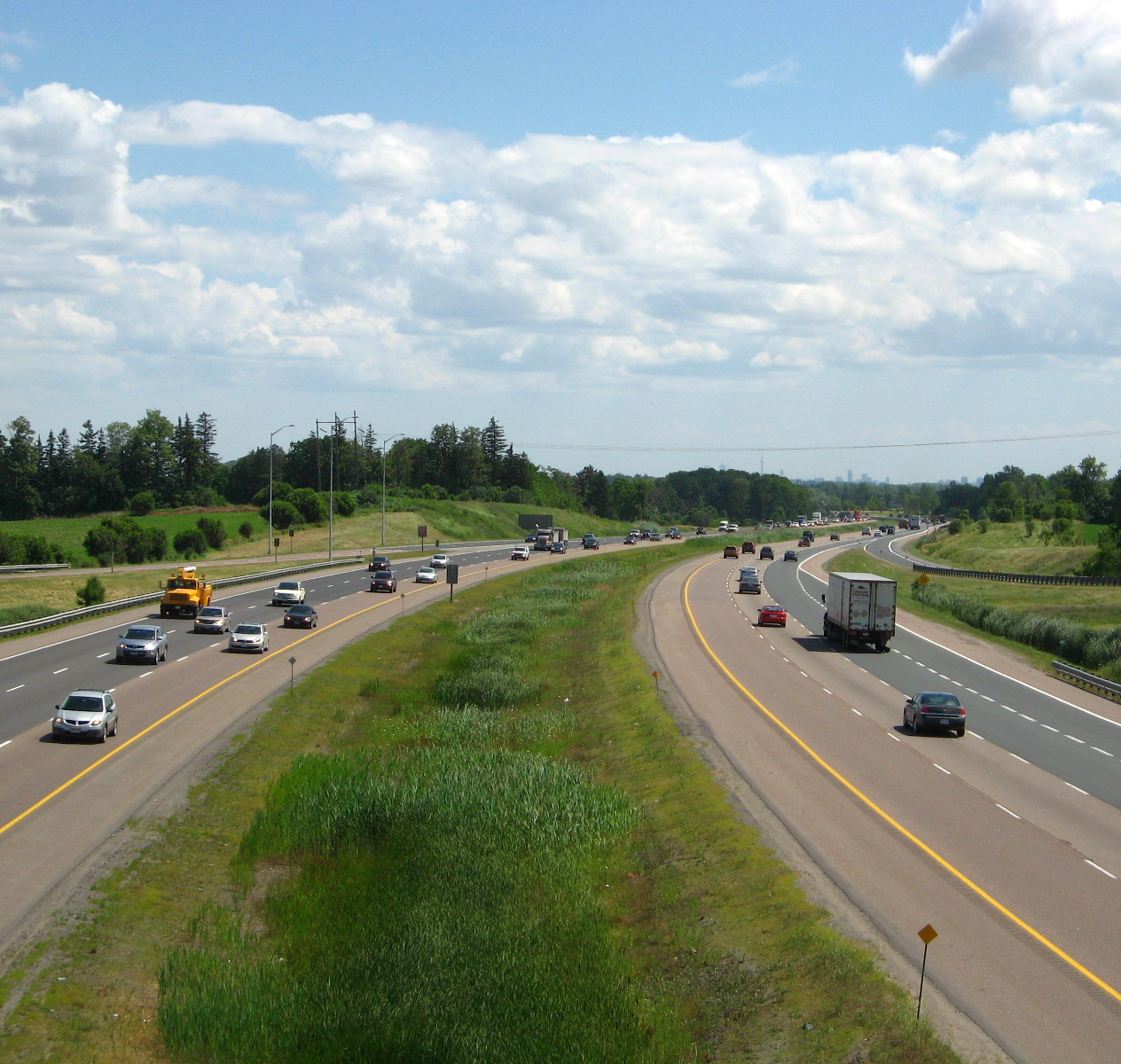
Highway 404 at Stouffville Road

At the interchange with Steeles Avenue which also includes a dedicated on-ramp from Woodbine Avenue (York Regional Road 8), the freeway enters the Regional Municipality of York where it diverges to the west before continuing north, running parallel to Woodbine Avenue. To the east are industrial units, while on the west are residential suburbs. This land-use persists north to the Highway 407 ETR junction, a multi-level combination interchange with two flyovers. At this point the freeway narrows and the central concrete barrier ends; a grass median taking its place between the opposing lanes. Immediately north of Highway 407, the freeway interchanges with Highway 7, and due to the close spacing of these two interchanges, the northbound off-ramp to Highway 7 is braided with the on-ramp from Highway 407 (and vice versa with the southbound ramps) to avoid weaving. The freeway passes west of Buttonville Municipal Airport (decommissioned as of November 2023) and then interchanges with 16th Avenue, and the proximity to the airport's runways necessitates that this freeway segment is illuminated by low poles, instead of the high mast lighting on the rest of the freeway.

The land-use density continues to drop, with the appearance of some open spaces and farms interspersed with industrial and commercial buildings. By 19th Avenue, just north of the Honda Canada headquarters in Markham, the land-use is agricultural on both sides of Highway 404. Highway 404 continues north, forming the eastern boundary of the municipalities of Richmond Hill, Aurora and Newmarket and the western boundary of Whitchurch-Stouffville. North of Wellington Street, the highway reduces in width to four lanes, which is its configuration north through East Gwillimbury. The route continues, passing east of the community of Queensville, where just a bit north, Highway 404 will meet the future Bradford Bypass, as it eventually curves northeast. The highway terminates at an at-grade intersection with Woodbine Avenue immediately south of Ravenshoe Road (York Regional Road 32) at the south end of Keswick.

== History ==
Facing south along Woodbine Avenue in 1965, with an intersection at Finch Avenue. By 1977, this was replaced by the six lane Highway 404 with a Parlo interchange with Finch.

=== Early studies ===
A freeway east of Highway 11 was planned as early as 1954, when the province extended Highway 48 south from Port Bolster. A large cloverleaf interchange was constructed with the Toronto Bypass, and plans formulated for a dual highway around the east side of Lake Simcoe, connecting with Highway 11 near Orillia or Gravenhurst. This route was dropped when Metropolitan Toronto began planning for the northern extension of the DVP in 1957, as subdivisions encroached upon Woodbine Avenue north of Highway 401. The six-lane expressway was to follow the alignment of Woodbine from its southern terminus at Lawrence Avenue to north of Steeles Avenue, where the Department of Highways (DHO) would continue the road as a "new King's Highway".

The Highway 401 / Don Valley Parkway interchange (which replaced an earlier interchange with Woodbine Avenue) under construction in 1965. The northern leg of the junction would eventually be designated as Highway 404.

In 1959, the DHO announced that they would construct and maintain the new route once the DVP was completed to Highway 401 and designate it Highway 404. The proposed route of the freeway was presented at a special delegation on December 13, 1960 by Harold Barry, a representative of the department. During this time Metro opened another section of the DVP from Lawrence Avenue to Highway 401 on November 17, 1966, followed by the section north of Highway 401 to Sheppard Avenue on March 1, 1967. As completed at that time, after passing Sheppard Avenue the parkway ended and transitioned to the two-lane Woodbine Avenue.

=== Construction begins ===
Design work on Highway 404 started in 1973, and construction began following the awarding of a C$6.9 million contract in March 1976. This contract included construction of the Finch Avenue interchange, overpasses at McNicoll and Van Horne Avenues and 4.5 km (2.8 mi) of six-lane freeway between Sheppard and Steeles Avenues. Shortly thereafter, on April 20, Ernest Avenue and Van Horne Avenue were closed to traffic at Woodbine. The existing Metro-built segment of the DVP between Sheppard and Highway 401 was absorbed as part of the new provincial freeway.

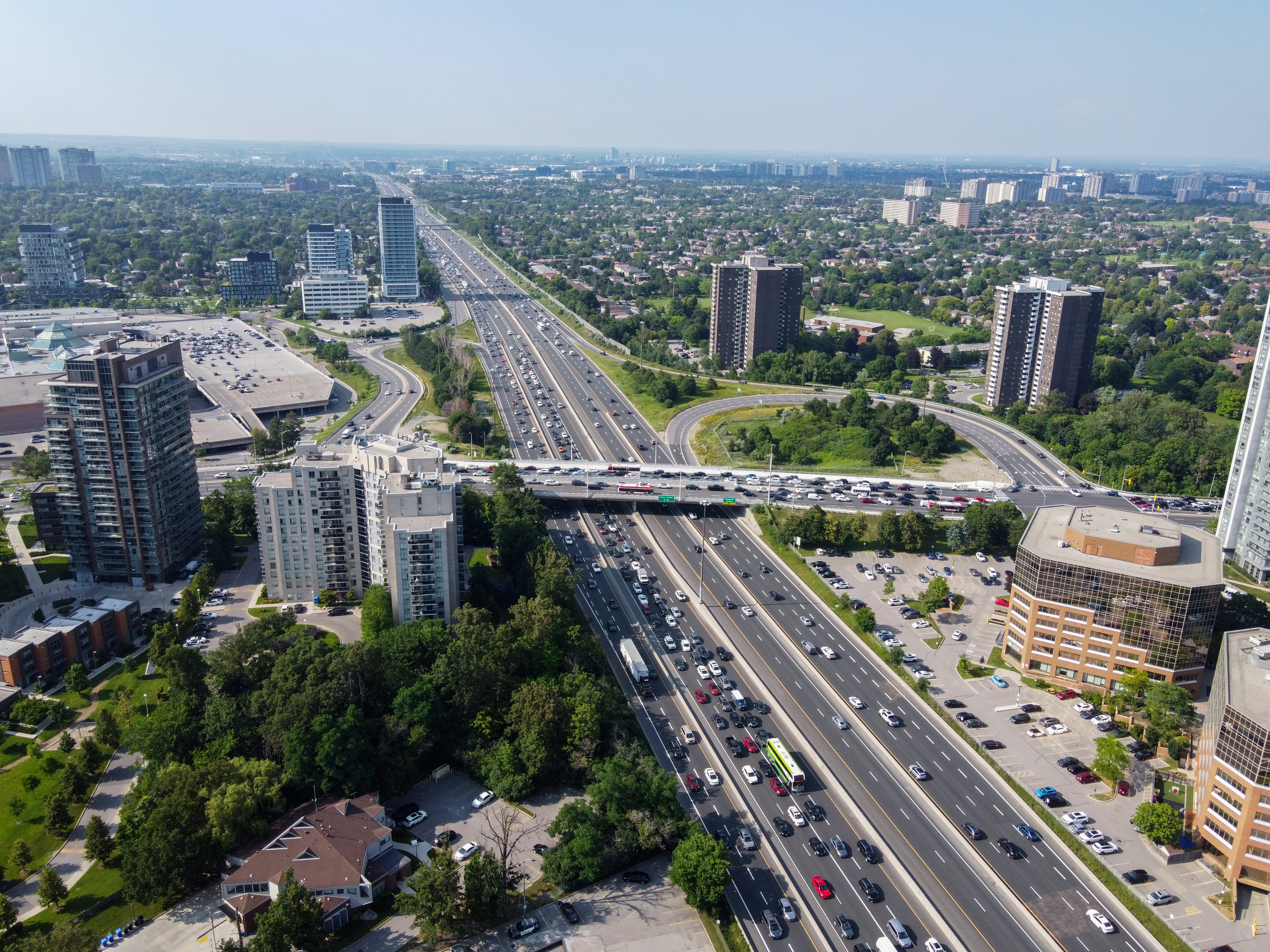
Originally built as part of the Don Valley Parkway, the segment south of Sheppard Avenue became part of Highway 404 in 1977.

The first section of Highway 404 between Highway 401 and Steeles Avenue opened in late 1977, including the flyover ramp from southbound Woodbine Avenue. The freeway was separated by a grass median with a steel box beam acting as a barrier between the lanes. Construction north of Toronto proceeded quickly, with the contract for the section from Steeles to Highway 7 being awarded in 1976 and the section opening on November 10, 1978. The next extension, to Stouffville Road (then known as the Gormley Side Road), was opened ceremoniously on December 9, 1980 by minister James Snow; the segment north of Highway 7 was four lanes wide.

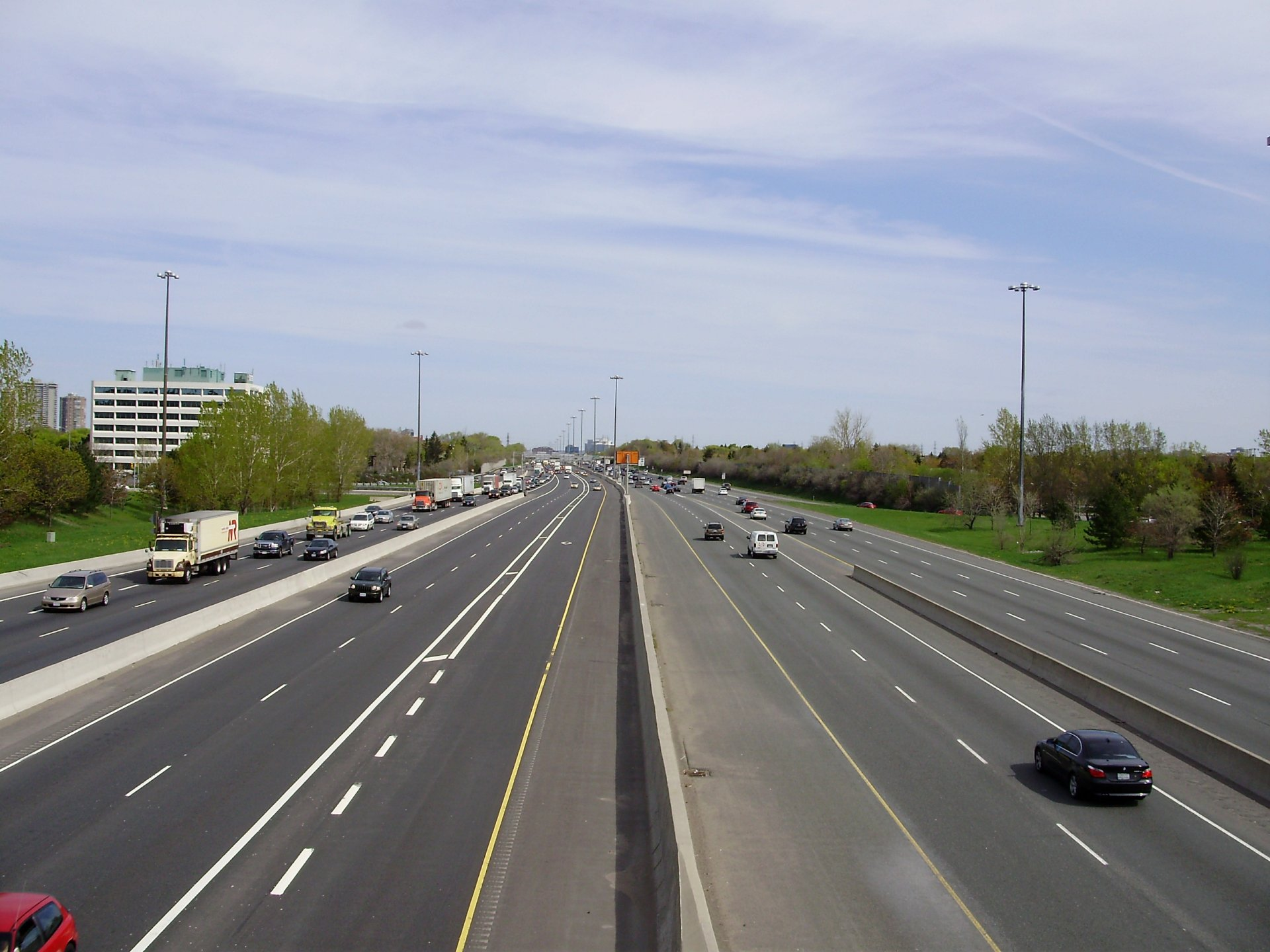
Looking north from Sheppard Avenue at Highway 404's divided cross-section; from left-to-right is the southbound collector lanes, southbound express lanes including HOV lane, on-ramp (from Highway 401), and northbound lanes.

The section of Highway 404 north of Stouffville Road was the subject of considerable controversy when work began to clear the route on May 15, 1981, before the completion of an environmental impact assessment. The Ministry of Transportation and Communications was charged with violating the newly-enacted Environmental Assessment Act, which it contested came into effect after construction of the extension had begun. Minister James Snow was charged with violating the act, and called upon to resign. He did not resign but paid a C$3,500 fine. Despite the issues surrounding it, the extension between Stouffville Road and Bloomington Road was opened ceremoniously on the morning of August 10, 1982.

As originally built by Metro, the Sheppard Avenue interchange with the parkway was originally a Parclo AB2, and Fairview Mall Drive then ran only east-west directly north of the shopping centre and also had its own on/off-ramps from the southbound lanes of Highway 404. In the 1980s the province removed the separate sets of Fairview Mall Drive and Sheppard Avenue ramps in favour of an on/off-ramp that fed directly to the shopping centre and an extension of Fairview Mall Drive whose eastbound lanes run south to meet with Sheppard Avenue.

Construction on the segment north of Bloomington to Aurora Sideroad was already in progress by this point. It was opened to traffic in late September 1985. 16th Avenue, which had been widened from two to four lanes during the mid-1980s, received ramps connecting to the freeway south of that existing underpass.

=== Extension to Newmarket ===
Construction on the 6.5-kilometre (4.0 mi) section from Wellington Street to Davis Drive began in early 1986, and the section opened to traffic on October 24, 1989 at 8:30 am. This final segment cost $22.1 million, ending the continuous construction program undertaken since 1973 at a cost of $83.3 million.

=== 1997-2007 expansion ===
Studies and environmental assessments into various extensions began almost immediately after the completion of the route to Newmarket in 1989; it would take over a decade for any northward progression to take place. The completion of the route to Davis Drive was met with scorn as traffic in Newmarket rapidly increased as the bedroom community grew with the new highway access. Municipal officials warned prior to the opening of the route that major traffic delays would be faced along Davis Drive. Then-mayor Ray Twinney began an immediate push to widen Green Lane – at that time an unpaved rural route – into a bypass of the town. Traffic delays were also compounded at the southern end of Toronto, where drivers whom had previously made use of Yonge Street, Bayview Avenue or Leslie Street would shift to make use of the new freeway.

By 1992, York Region was moving forward with plans to expand Green Lane into a four lane road, while the province was urged to consider extending Highway 404 north to it, and eventually around the east side of Lake Simcoe. The province studied this and other options over the following years, before a formal announcement was made by Minister of Transportation Tony Clement on June 22, 1998, along with York Region chairman Bill Fisch. The plan called for an extension of Highway 404 north to Green Lane, and widening of Highway 9, the western extension of Davis Drive (now part of it after being downloaded and redesignated as York Regional Road 31 east of Highway 400) outside town, to five lanes between Highway 400 and Bathurst Street. At the time over 20,000 vehicles used Davis Drive on an average day.

Preliminary clearing in a field north of Green Lane in April 2011

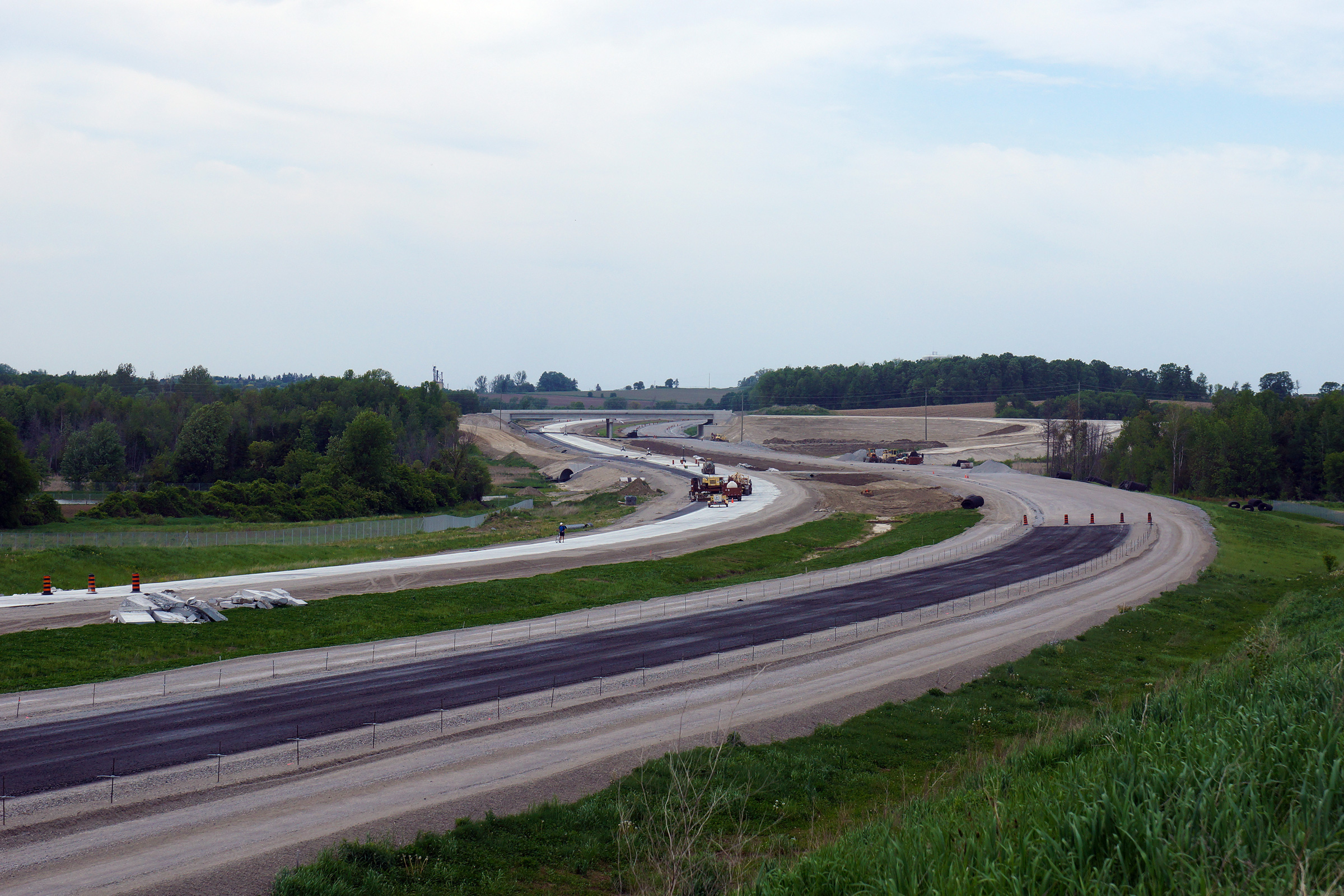
Advanced construction work near Doane Road in June 2014

In the interim period, work went into expanding the six lane freeway through Toronto and Markham. A combination interchange was built with the new Highway 407 ETR which opened in June 1997, which as a prerequisite required the realignment of some ramps from the nearby Highway 7 interchange. In early 1998, the MTO announced plans for two contracts to widen Highway 404 south of Highway 7. The first contract converted the grass median into an additional lane in each direction with a central concrete barrier between them, with the inner lanes to eventually be converted into HOV lanes. High-mast lighting was installed in the median barrier, replacing the unique luminaires that were mounted outside of the right shoulder of each carriageway. With the shift in road illumination completed as a prerequisite, the second contract would result in an additional lane in each direction on the outside the existing freeway south of Highway 407, making it ten lanes wide, with expansion of the southbound and northbound lanes completed in 2005 and 2007, respectively.

In conjunction with the widening to add HOV lanes, improvements were made to the bottlenecked interchange with Highway 401. This involved the construction of a two-lane on-ramp receiving traffic from the eastbound Highway 401 express and collectors that would converge with Highway 404 northbound without access to Sheppard Avenue, while the existing single lane on-ramp for that same movement was retained for Highway 401 collector traffic to exit at Sheppard Avenue. In early 2004, construction began on a new ramp from the Highway 404 southbound HOV lane to the Highway 401 westbound collectors, with the ramp consisting of a curved tunnel beneath the Highway 404's southbound general traffic lanes. To accommodate the HOV tunnel ramp, the directional ramp for general traffic from Highway 404 southbound to the Highway 401 westbound collectors was shifted further west with its entry just under the Don Mills Road overpass while also realigned to permit a higher speed. On December 13, 2005, the southbound HOV lane was opened to traffic. This was one of the three original HOV lanes in Ontario; the other two HOV lanes were on Highway 403 in Mississauga. Work on the northbound HOV lane began shortly thereafter, opening at 8:30 am on Monday, July 23, 2007. As the freeway crosses Highway 7, the southbound HOV lane started as an additional lane while the northbound HOV lane transitioned to a standard through lane as the rightmost general travel lane merged.

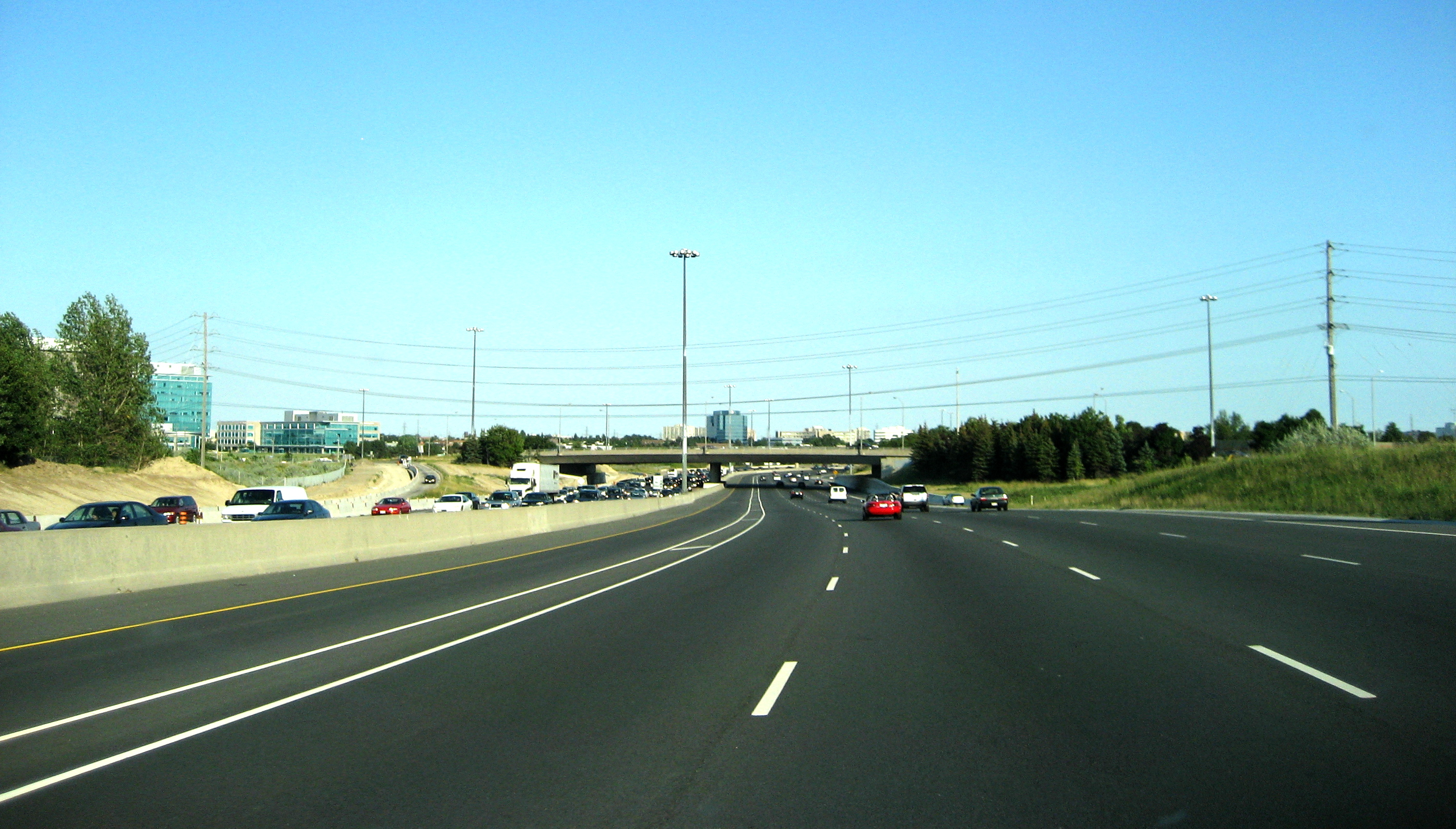
Highway 404 southbound, near the interchange with Steeles Avenue c. 2006. The southbound HOV lane was completed, while construction was still underway on the northbound HOV lane.

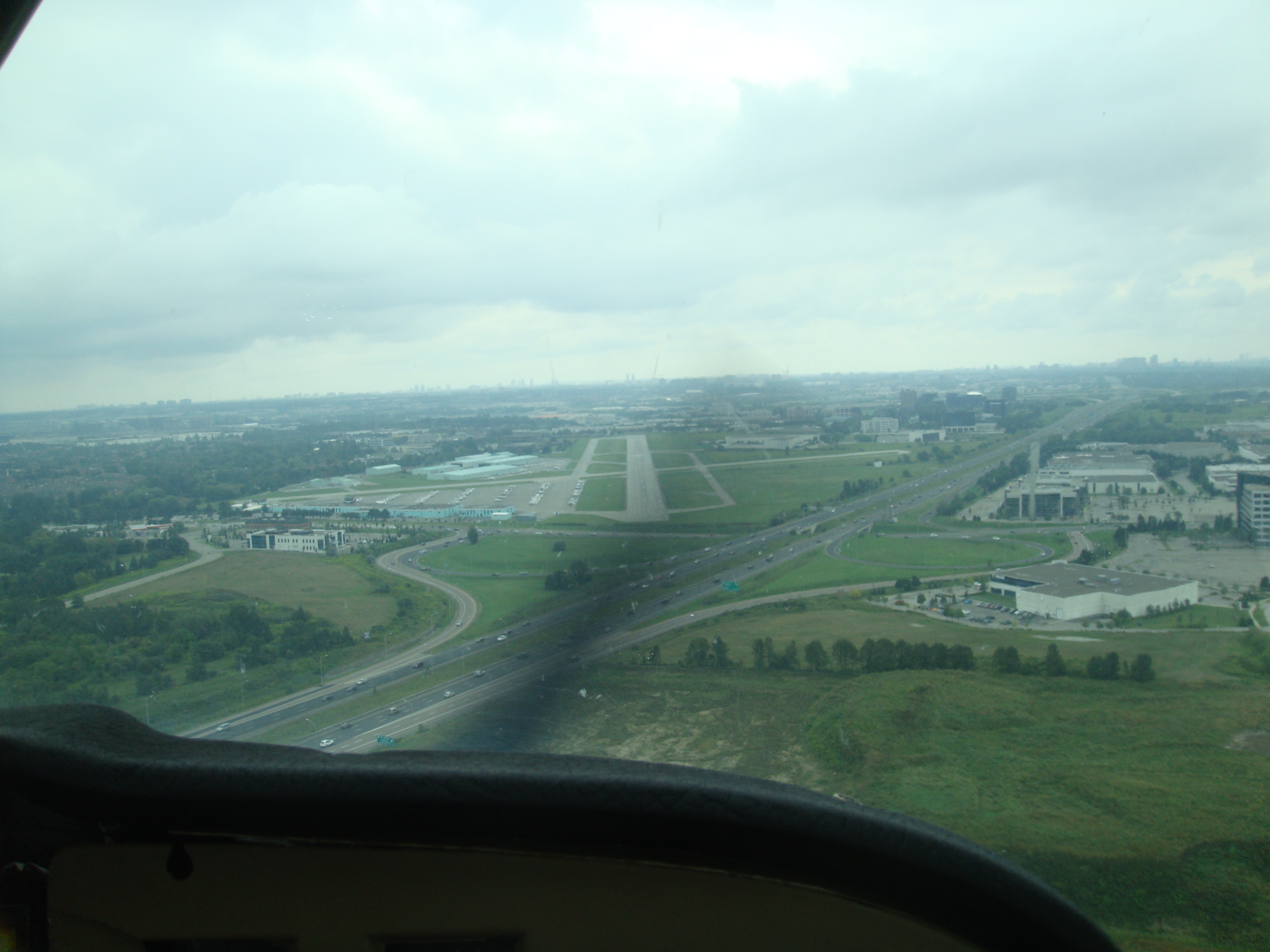
Looking south at the interchange with 16th Avenue, with Buttonville Municipal Airport in southeast quadrant. The freeway configuration is after its 2002 widening, with a narrowed grass median that would be paved over during the route's 2023 expansion.

In 1999, Highway 404 was widened to six lanes between Highway 7 and Major Mackenzie Drive, using the right-of-way afforded by the grass median. Ramps were added to connect Regional Road 73 (16th Avenue) with the segment of Highway 404 north of that junction, making it a full interchange. On June 19, 2003, Transportation Minister and Oak Ridges MPP Frank Klees opened the new ramps, with Thornhill MPP Tina Molinari also in attendance, with traffic permitted onto the ramp following the ceremony. The MTO formally announced plans to alleviate traffic in Newmarket on August 28, 2000: a three contract project to widen and extend Highway 404. The first contract added an additional lane in each direction in the grass median from Major Mackenzie Drive to Bloomington Road. A second contract then extended those two lanes north to Aurora Sideroad. These two projects both began in the summer of 2001 and were completed in December. The third contract (see below) was an extension from Davis Drive to Green Lane. The MTO formally announced plans to alleviate traffic in Newmarket on August 28, 2000: a three contract project to widen and extend Highway 404. The first contract added an additional lane in each direction in the grass median from Major Mackenzie Drive to Bloomington Road. A second contract then extended those two lanes north to Aurora Sideroad. These two projects both began in the summer of 2001 and were completed in December. The third contract called for a four lane extension from Davis Drive to Green Lane and the reconstruction of Green Lane into a four-laned arterial road between Leslie Street and Woodbine Avenue. This contract began shortly after the announcement in September 2000. The extension was opened to traffic on February 8, 2002, at a ceremony attended by York North MPP Julia Munro and York Region chairman Bill Fisch.

=== Extension to Keswick ===
On May 16, 2006, the MTO announced plans to extend Highway 404 by 15 km (9.3 mi) from Green Lane to Woodbine Avenue at the south end of Keswick. The first contracts were awarded later that year for the construction of the northbound bridge over Green Lane, followed by two structures over Mount Albert Road, west of Woodbine Avenue, begun in late 2008 and completed in 2009. By April 2011, the extension had been cleared and graded. Completion was originally scheduled for December 15, 2012, with landscaping work to continue the following spring. However, due to soil conditions and utility relocation issues, the project was delayed by nearly two years. The C$99 million extension opened on September 17, 2014.

=== Further widening for extension of HOV lanes ===
On December 9, 2016, the MTO announced that the segment between Highway 407 and Stouffville Road would be widened from six to eight lanes with the additional inner lanes to be used as HOV lanes. Much of the work involved paving over the remainder of the grass median and erecting a concrete barrier. A complex part of this project involved the staged replacement of the existing 16th Avenue and Rouge River bridges that have been in service when the freeway opened; the old 16th Avenue underpasses had been widened twice (in 1988 for new ramps, and in 2002 for the freeway expansion) but still permitted only four lanes of an increasingly-congested 16th to pass through, and the old Rouge River bridges were originally designed with two freeway lanes each and for the 2002 expansion they were restriped for three lanes by removing the shoulders. A carpool lot was added at Major Mackenzie Drive at the start of the project. Construction north of Major Mackenzie Drive started in 2017 and was completed in 2021, while construction south of Major Mackenzie started in 2019 and was scheduled to be completed by the end of August 2024. The southbound HOV lane south of Stouffville Road opened on September 16, 2024 and the northbound HOV lane opened on September 28, 2024.

== Future ==
Long term proposals by the province call for Highway 404 to be extended to Highway 12, between Sunderland and Beaverton. This extension would follow a new alignment to Port Bolster, east of which the freeway would incorporate the existing two lanes of Highway 48. It has drawn criticism from various environmental groups, which claim it would serve only to accelerate urban sprawl north of Toronto.

== Exit list ==
The following table lists the major junctions along Highway 404, as noted by the Ministry of Transportation of Ontario.

Division	Location	km	mi	Exit	Destinations	Notes
Toronto		0.0– 0.5	0.0– 0.31	17	Don Valley Parkway south – Downtown Toronto Highway 401 – London, Kingston	Highway 404 southern terminus; freeway and exit numbers continue as Don Valley Parkway; Highway 401 exit 375
Toronto		1.4	0.87	18	Sheppard Avenue	Direct southbound exit and entrance from Fairview Mall; to North York General Hospital
Toronto		3.5	2.2	20	Finch Avenue	
Toronto–York boundary	Toronto–Markham boundary	5.7	3.5	22	Regional Road 8 north (Woodbine Avenue); Steeles Avenue	Northbound exit and southbound entrance from Woodbine Avenue, full access interchange with Steeles Avenue
York	Markham	8.9	5.5	26	407 ETR – Hamilton, Peterborough	Highway 407 exit 83
York	Markham–Richmond Hill boundary	9.8	6.1	27	Regional Road 7 (Highway 7)	Formerly Highway 7 until April 1, 1999 no access to/from Highway 407
York	Markham–Richmond Hill boundary	11.8	7.3	29	Regional Road 73 (16th Avenue)	Eastbound off-ramp and on-ramp at 16th Avenue are located in NE quadrant, due to Buttonville Airport occupying SE quadrant. Originally no interchange; however, in 1988, ramps were added to connect with the freeway south of 16th Avenue, followed in 2003 with ramps connecting to the freeway north of 16th Avenue, making it a full interchange.
York	Markham–Richmond Hill boundary	13.8	8.6	31	Regional Road 25 (Major Mackenzie Drive)	
York	Markham–Richmond Hill boundary	15.7	9.8	33	Regional Road 49 (Elgin Mills Road)	Exit opened in 2004.
York	Richmond Hill–Whitchurch-Stouffville boundary	20.1	12.5	37	Regional Road 14 (Stouffville Road)	
York	Richmond Hill–Aurora–Whitchurch-Stouffville tripoint	24.2	15.0	41	Regional Road 40 (Bloomington Road)	
York	Aurora–Whitchurch-Stouffville boundary	28.4	17.6	45	Regional Road 15 (Wellington Street)	
York	Newmarket–Whitchurch-Stouffville boundary	32.4	20.1	49	Regional Road 74 (Vivian Road, Mulock Road)	Northbound exit and southbound entrance
York	Newmarket–Whitchurch-Stouffville–East Gwillimbury tripoint	34.5	21.4	51	Regional Road 31 (Davis Drive)	To Southlake Regional Health Centre; to Highway 9
York	East Gwillimbury	36.6	22.7	53	Regional Road 19 (Green Lane)	Former northern terminus of Highway 404; truck route to Highway 400
York	East Gwillimbury	43.0	26.7	59	Regional Road 77 (Queensville Sideroad) – Queensville	
York	East Gwillimbury	44.6	27.7	—	Highway 425 Bradford Bypass	Possible interchange location for proposed freeway
York	East Gwillimbury	49.1	30.5	65	Regional Road 8 (Woodbine Avenue) to Regional Road 32 (Ravenshoe Road)	Highway 404 northern terminus
1.000 mi = 1.609 km; 1.000 km = 0.621 mi: Electronic toll collection; Incomplete access; Route transition; Unopened
