= Alexander Mackenzie High School =

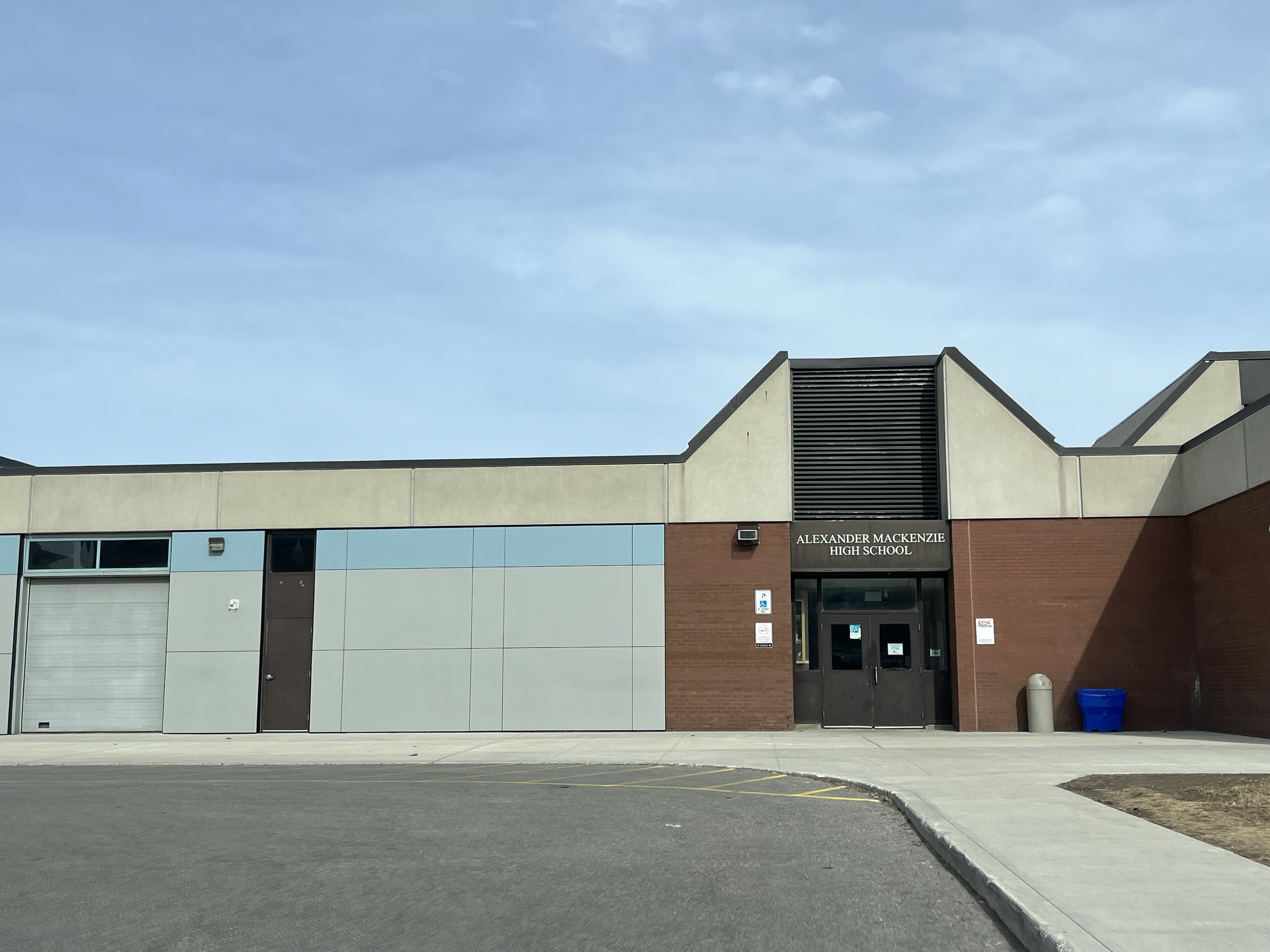

Location
- 300 Major Mackenzie Dr. W. Richmond Hill, Ontario, L4C 3S3; Canada; 43°52′12″N 79°26′50″W

Information
- Former name: Don Head Secondary School (1969–1992)
- School type: Public school
- Religious affiliation: Secular
- Founded: 1969
- School board: York Region District School Board
- Superintendent: Lois Agard
- Area trustee: Simon Cui
- Grades: 9 to 12
- Enrolment: 1,397 (October 2025)
- Language: English
- Colours: Blue and Yellow
- Team name: Mustangs
- Website: www.yrdsb.ca/schools/alexandermackenzie.hs/Pages/default.aspx
- Last updated: May 2026

Alexander Mackenzie High School (AMHS), formerly known as Don Head Secondary School, is a public secondary school in Richmond Hill, Ontario, Canada, serving students in grades 9 through 12. The school is managed by the York Region District School Board.

The school opened in 1969 as Don Head Secondary School and was renamed Alexander Mackenzie High School in 1992, in honour of Major Addison Alexander Mackenzie, a Richmond Hill resident and philanthropist.

== History ==
The original school building was constructed in 1969. Due to a construction strike, the building's opening was delayed until January 5, 1970, at which time there were 450 students. Prior to the building's completion, starting in September 1969, classes were held at the existing Richmond Hill High School. At the time of opening, some vocational courses were transferred from Stouffville District Secondary School.

In 1992, a new wing was added to accommodate both increased student population and changes to the school program. A second addition of 10 classrooms opened in the spring of 2002. The school has two gymnasiums, one larger than the other, as well as three music rooms: one for vocals, one for strings, and one for band.

In 2003, the Town of Richmond Hill contributed 10 "Character Matters" signs to the school as part of a community initiative. The event featured guest speaker Wendel Clark, the former Toronto Maple Leafs captain.

== Specialized programs ==
=== ARTS Mackenzie ===
It was announced in October 2008 that AMHS would join Huron Heights S.S., Unionville High School, and Westmount Collegiate as one of four high schools in York Region to offer a specialized arts program. ARTS Mackenzie encompasses dance, theatre arts, music, and visual arts.

=== IB Diploma Programme ===
In 2017, AMHS joined Bayview S.S., G.W. Williams S.S., Maple H.S., and Milliken Mills H.S. as one of the York Region District School Board's IB Diploma Programme schools.

== Notable alumni ==
- Mobolade Ajomale – Olympic sprinter
- Hannah Alper – activist, blogger, and motivational speaker
- Ramin Karimloo – stage actor
- Scott McGillivray – entrepreneur, investor, television host, author, and educator

== See also ==
- Education in Ontario
- List of secondary schools in Ontario
- Sir Alexander Mackenzie Senior Public School
