= Aurora High School =

Aurora High School may refer to,

== In Canada ==
- Aurora High School (Ontario), Aurora, Ontario

== In the United States ==
- Aurora Central High School, Aurora, Colorado
- Aurora Alternative High School (Indiana), Bloomington, Indiana
- Aurora High School (Nebraska), Aurora, Nebraska
- Aurora High School (North Carolina), in Aurora, North Carolina that was consolidated with Southside High School (North Carolina)
- Aurora High School (Ohio), Aurora, Ohio
- Aurora High School (California), Calexico, California
- West Aurora High School, Aurora, Illinois
