= ULOC =

ULOC may refer to:

- Ultra Large Ore Carrier, see bulk carrier
- University of London Orienteering Club
- Uloc, a fictional world appearing in The Forgotten World of Uloc
- Unsecured line of credit, see Line of credit
