= TDSS =

TDSS may refer to:

- Alureon, a trojan sometimes also known as TDSS
- Tommy Douglas Secondary School
- The Death of Slim Shady (Coup de Grâce), a 2024 album by Eminem
