= Westmount Collegiate Institute =

Location
- 1000 New Westminster Drive; Thornhill, Ontario, L4J 8G3; Canada; 43.8176°N 79.4534°W

Information
- School type: High school
- Religious affiliation: Secular
- Founded: 1995
- School board: York Region District School Board
- Superintendent: Steven Gardner
- Area trustee: Estelle Cohen
- School number: 952516
- Principal: Michelle Randall
- Grades: 9-12
- Enrolment: 1170 (October 2015)
- Language: English
- Campus: Suburban
- Colours: Teal, Dusty Rose
- Mascot: Wolf
- Team name: Westmount Wolves
- Website: www.yrdsb.ca/schools/westmount.ci/
- Last updated: March 2022

Westmount Collegiate Institute is a high school in the Thornhill, Ontario district of the greater city of Vaughan. It opened its doors in 1996, as part of the multi-purpose campus now known as the Jean Augustine Complex, named for Jean Augustine, the first African Canadian woman elected to Parliament and appointed to the federal cabinet. The complex contains the high school, Rosemount Community Centre, and the City Playhouse Theatre, to which the school is given limited access. The school is part of the York Region District School Board. Westmount is one of the 29 secondary schools in the board which comprises 191 schools altogether. Westmount is known for its arts program and its strong academic program. Many awards have been given to recognize the art, drama, dance, and music program known as ArtsWest. Mathematics and the sciences were also recognized with York Regional awards. The school is three levels with the first floor hosting many Arts, tech classes and the gymnasium, the second floor is prevalent in languages, and the third floor has many computer based classes, mathematics, business, and sciences.

== Jean Augustine Complex ==
=== Rosemount Community Centre ===
The community centre, which is attached to the northern edge of the school, contains an arena, a split gymnasium, and recreational rooms used for different events and programs, such as playing bridge. Rosemount also hosts various summer camps and programs, such as summer stock. The name of the community centre was created by merging the names of two nearby elementary schools and subdivisions, Rosedale and Westmount. The school is given access to the gym and arena throughout the years, such as for the school's hockey team.

=== City Playhouse ===
Adjoining Westmount from the southern portion of the complex, the City Playhouse is a 386-seat, community-based theatre featuring a wide variety of professional, community and school productions. It also serves the community as a rental house, particularly during the offseason months of May–September. The box office is on the south side of the theatre adjacent to New Westminster Drive. Similar to the community centre, the high school is given access to the theatre for use in assemblies, Westmount drama productions as well as other theatrical shows and the bi-annual musical productions, Springfest and Winterfest. Known productions to frequent the theatre include but are not limited to City Youth Players, Starbeat, Characters, Judy & David, and even the in-house City Playhouse Productions. Marquee Productions was also a major company to produce shows for the theatre, among others in the Greater Toronto Area, but are no longer producing for the City Playhouse theatre having finished their last projects there in April 2012.

=== Nursery ===
Attached to the west side of the complex, the Butternut Child Centre is a preschool which exists for children aged four and younger. There has been a mutual relationship between this nursery's daily functions and Westmount's student body, such as the observation of daycare kids by students taking Human Growth and Development and likewise, the kids being walked around the school during operating hours.

== Building ==
The complex was built by MCW Consultants in 1995, who later built a similar complex in Newmarket, Ontario, Newmarket High School. It too contains a similar attached community theatre. The older Milliken Mills High School in Markham, Ontario, built in 1988, has a similar layout on the inside to the two; however, it contains a very different façade and décor. All three schools contain a large open atrium with a grand staircase that handles the highest volume of students getting to and from class. Even though these schools are in three cities, they are all part of the York Region District School Board.

== Arts West ==
In 2009, Westmount started to offer an arts program called ArtsWest, where the applicant can either major in music (instrumental), dance, visual arts, vocals, or drama in the following school year. ArtsWest is the fourth arts program within York Region.

== Alumni ==
Notable alumni include:

- Alon Badat (born 1989), Israeli footballer
- Sam Schachter (born 1990), Olympic beach volleyball player

== See also ==
- Education in Ontario
- List of secondary schools in Ontario
- St. Elizabeth Catholic High School
- Huron Heights Secondary School (Newmarket)
- Unionville High School
