= Unionville High School =

Unionville High School may refer to several high schools:

- Unionville High School (Ontario), in Unionville, Ontario, Canada
- Unionville High School (Kennett Square, Pennsylvania), in the United States
