= AAHS =

AAHS may refer to:

== Schools ==
- Academy of Allied Health & Science, a magnet public high school in Union County, New Jersey
- Air Academy High School, a public high school serving Colorado Springs, Colorado
- Aurora Alternative High School in Indiana
- Altoona Area High School, Pennsylvania

== Other uses ==
- Radio AAHS, a long-standing radio station serving the Minneapolis – Saint Paul region
- American Aviation Historical Society
