= Markham Gateway Public School =

Location
- 30 Fonda Road; Markham, Ontario, Canada

Information
- School type: Public elementary school
- Established: 2001
- School board: York Region District School Board
- Area trustee: Michael Chen
- Principal: Fayza Prebtani
- Grades: JK-8
- Enrollment: c.500
- Colors: Blue and silver
- Mascot: Titan

Markham Gateway Public School (MGPS) is a public provincially funded school in the neighbourhood of East Milliken in Markham, Ontario, Canada. It is part of the York Region District School Board and is one of the six feeder schools of Middlefield Collegiate Institute.

== Academics ==
In the 2022–23 school year for third-grade students based on EQAO test results, 77% of students were at or above the provincial standard in mathematics and 85% were in reading and writing. For sixth-grade students, 68% were at or above the provincial standard in mathematics, 98% were in reading, and 95% were in writing.

== Staff ==
The current principal of the school (as of 2023–24) is Fayza Prebtani.
