= Sir William Mulock Secondary School =

Location
- 705 Columbus Way; Newmarket, Ontario; Canada; 44°1′53″N 79°28′48″W

Information
- School type: Secondary school
- Religious affiliation: Secular
- Founded: December 2001
- School board: York Region District School Board
- Superintendent: Paul Carew
- Area trustee: Martin Van Beek
- Principal: Debbie Ziegler
- Grades: 9-12
- Enrolment: 1240 (October 2013)
- Language: English
- Campus: Urban
- Area: Newmarket, Ontario
- Colours: Black and Gold
- Mascot: Billy the Raven
- Website: mulock.sharpschool.com
- Last updated: September 2014

Sir William Mulock Secondary School is a secondary school located at 705 Columbus Way, off Mulock Drive in Newmarket, Ontario, Canada. It is one of four high schools in Newmarket under the jurisdiction of the York Region District School Board (a fifth school, Sacred Heart Catholic High School, is under the York Catholic District School Board) and currently educates students from Grades 9 to 12. It opened in December 2001. Prior to that, most of its students went to Newmarket High School. The founding students have demonstrated the initiative of character traits by creating original 'character feathers' which can be found in the main hall.

== Background ==
The school is named after Sir William Mulock, an important figure in Canadian politics at the end of the 19th century, leading into the 20th century. He was one of the most prominent residents of Armitage, the first community established in King that has since been subsumed by Newmarket.

== Notable alumni ==
- Connor McDavid, professional hockey player in the NHL and current captain of the Edmonton Oilers

== See also ==
- Education in Ontario
- List of secondary schools in Ontario
- York Region District School Board
- Newmarket, Ontario
