= Cachet, Markham =

Cachet
- Neighbourhood
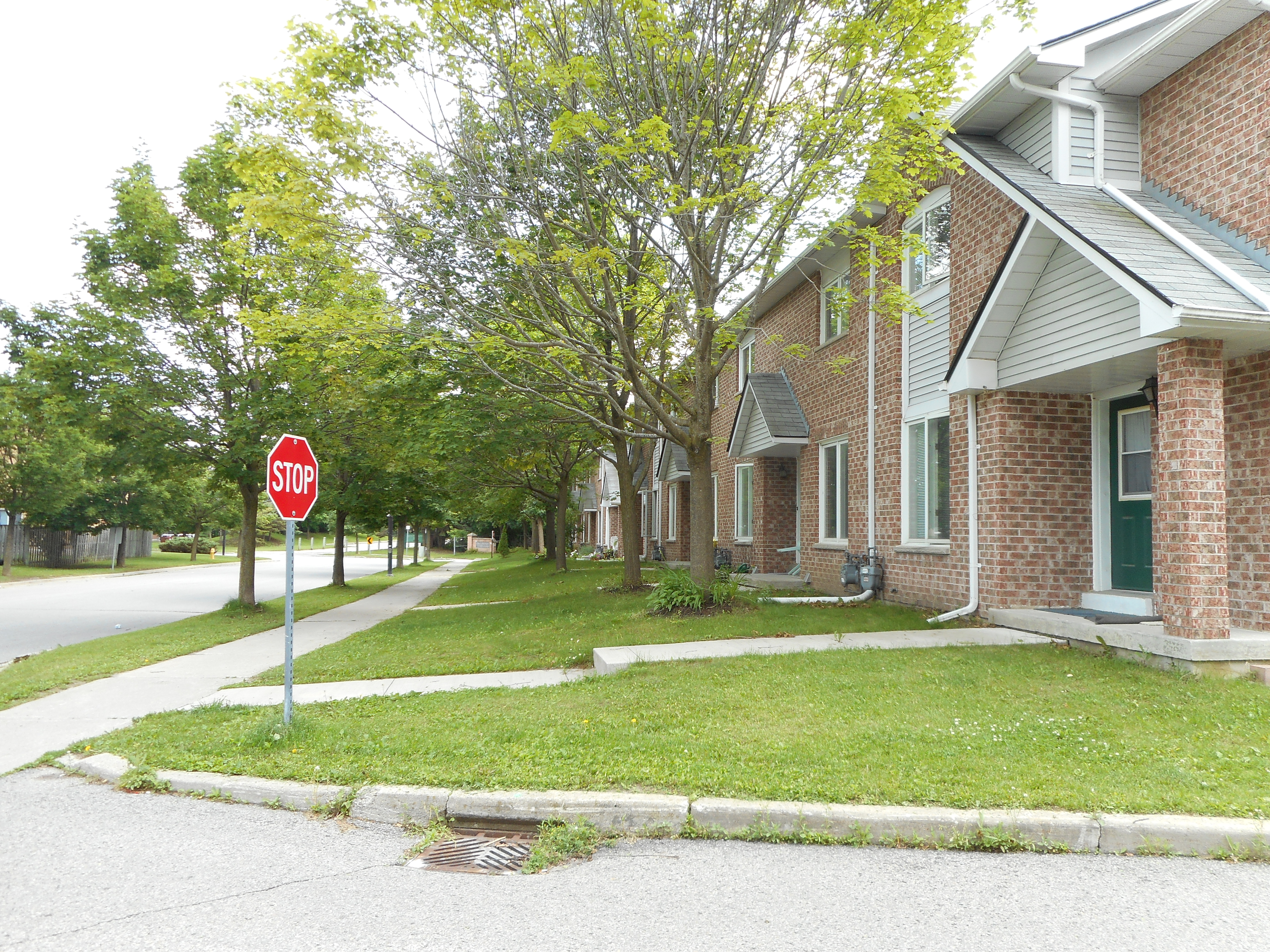
- Ashton Meadows in Cachet, Markham
- Interactive map of Cachet
- Coordinates: 43.8883°N 79.345°W
- Country: Canada
- Province: Ontario
- Regional municipality: York
- City: Markham
- Time zone: UTC-5 (EST)
  - Summer (DST): UTC-4 (EDT)
- Area codes: 905 and 289
- NTS Map: 030M14
- GNBC Code: FEQSW

Cachet (Pronunciation: cash-AY) is a neighbourhood within northwestern Markham, Ontario, Canada. It is bounded by 16th Avenue to the south, Major Mackenzie Drive East to the north, Warden Avenue to the east and Highway 404 to the west.

The area is a residential development that has replaced farmland that once defined the area. The residents of Cachet consist mostly of middle to upper-income families and the housing consists of large single family homes. The Cachet Centre is a small strip mall that services mainly to local residents. There is also an Asian shopping centre at the intersection of Woodbine Avenue and Markland Street, King Square. The population of the community is predominantly Chinese with European and South Asian minorities.

The Rouge River and Berczy Creek flows through the community. This neighbourhood is also home to Ashton Meadows Public School, St. Monica Catholic Elementary School, and St. Augustine Catholic High School. The Ashton Meadows community and the Kin Village disability community consists of government housing. Many students who attended Ashton Meadows Public School go on to Pierre Elliott Trudeau High School, located at Berczy Village, on Bur Oak Avenue and Kennedy Road. Many students who attended St. Monica Catholic Elementary School go on to the nearby St. Augustine Catholic High School.

== Transportation ==
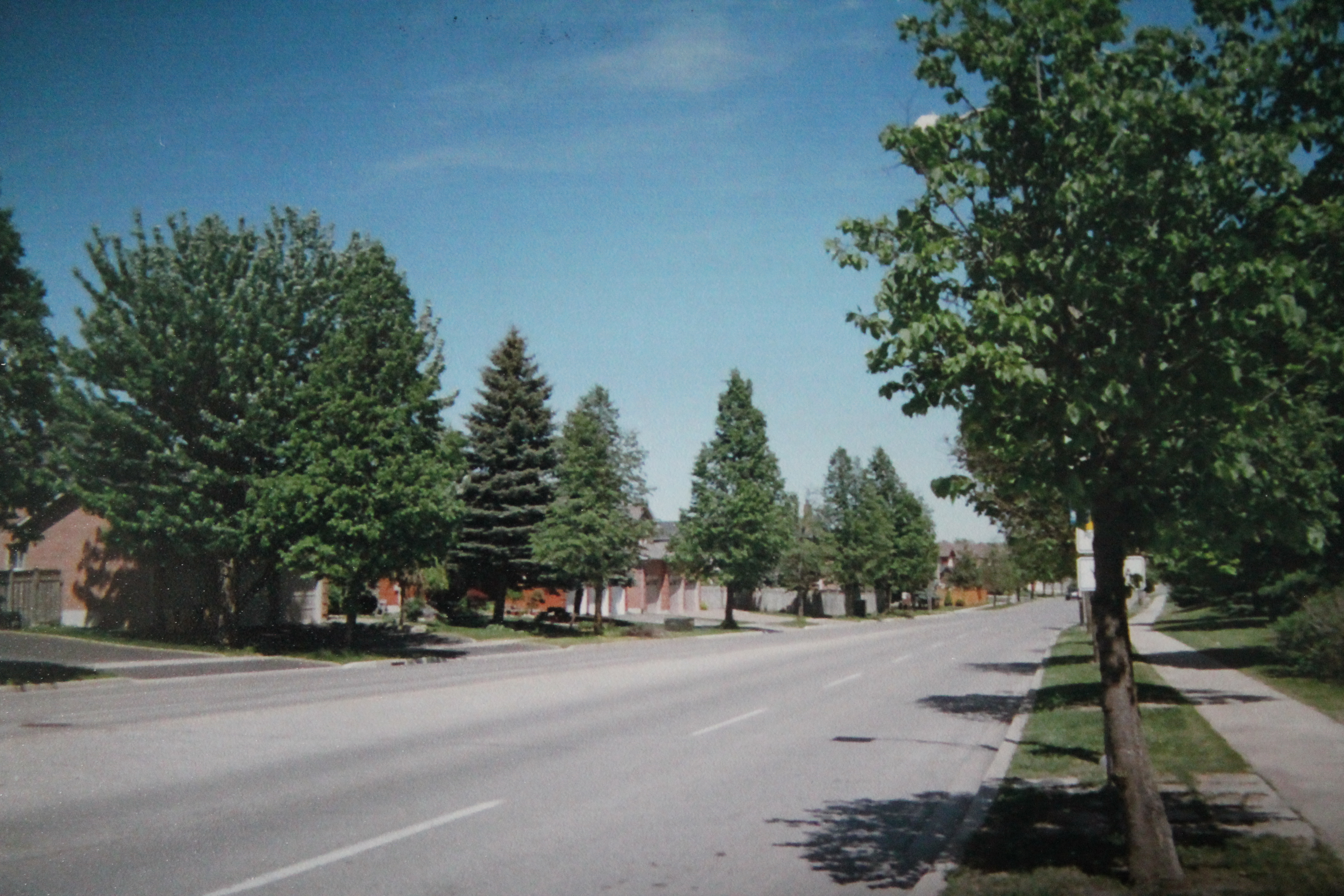
Rodick Road at Woodbine Avenue

Cachet is a short distance from Highway 404 via the interchange at 16th Avenue. It is also a short distance from the Buttonville Airport, which is slated to be closed and redeveloped.

== Parks ==
- Ashton Meadows Park
- Calvert Park
- Personna Park

=== Trail Parks ===
- Macrill Crescent Pond
- Thomas Frisby Woods

== Development ==
=== Construction Phase ===
Year of Construction	Number of Housing Units	% of Development
~1946	0	0%
1947 - 1960	10	1%
1961 -1970	40	2%
1971 - 1980	50	3%
1981 - 1990	220	11%
1991 - 1995	915	47%
1996 - 2001	710	37%

=== Housing Type Mix ===
Type	Number of Housing Units	%
Rowhouses	265	14%
Semi-Detached	0	0%
Detached	1610	83%
Large buildings (Under 5 Storeys)	65	3%
