= Bill Hogarth Secondary School =

Location
- 100 Donald Sim Avenue; Cornell, Ontario, L6B 0R4; Canada; 43.8928°N 79.2306°W

Information
- School type: Public, secondary school
- Motto: Character Education, Citizenship, Critical Thinking & Problem Solving, Creativity & Imagination, Communication and Collaboration
- Opened: September 2017
- Superintendent: Peter Tse
- Area trustee: Michael Chen
- School number: 890202
- Principal: Robert Cotey
- Grades: 9-12
- Enrollment: 2093 (2025)
- Colours: Red; Black; Gold
- Team name: Hornets
- Website: www.yrdsb.ca/schools/billhogarth.ss/

Bill Hogarth Secondary School is a public high school in Markham, Ontario, Canada operated by the York Region District School Board. It opened in November 2017 for students in grades 9 and 10, some of whom were transferred from Pierre Elliott Trudeau High School. It offers a French immersion track in addition to the English curriculum. It is located at the intersection of Bur Oak Avenue and Almira Avenue.

The school is named after Bill Hogarth, a former teacher and director of the York Region District School Board.

Construction of the school was delayed by rain from April to July 2017, necessitating the school's opening being delayed from September to November 2017. During those months, students attended the nearby Bur Oak Secondary School.

== Feeder schools ==
The following elementary schools are part of the Bill Hogarth S.S feeder schools (transferred from Bur Oak SS and Pierre Elliott Trudeau HS):

- Black Walnut Public School
- Rouge Park Public School
- Cornell Village Public School
- Little Rouge Public School
- Sam Chapman Public School (FI)
- Franklin Street Public School (FI)
- Glad Park Public School (FI)
- Milliken Mills Public School (FI)

== See also ==
- Education in Ontario
- List of secondary schools in Ontario
