= King City Secondary School =

Location
- 2001 King Road; King City, Ontario, L7B 1K2; Canada; 43°55′51″N 79°31′7″W

Information
- School type: High school
- Motto: Semper progrediens (Always progressing)
- Religious affiliation: Secular
- Founded: 1961
- School board: York Region District School Board
- Superintendent: Neil Gunathunge
- Area trustee: Bob McRoberts
- School number: 919586
- Principal: Raymond Fung
- Grades: 9-12
- Enrolment: 963 (October 2013)
- Language: English
- Colours: Green and gold
- Mascot: Lion
- Team name: Lions
- Vice-principals: Tim Wesson
- Website: www.yrdsb.ca/schools/kingcity.ss/Pages/default.aspx
- Last updated: November 2021

King City Secondary School (KCSS) is a secondary education facility in King City, Ontario, Canada. It is a secular public school administered by the York Region District School Board. The school is located at 2001 King Road, and the current principal is Helga Curry. The school day runs from 08:20 to 14:30.

A French immersion program was established at the school beginning in September 2019.

== Campus ==
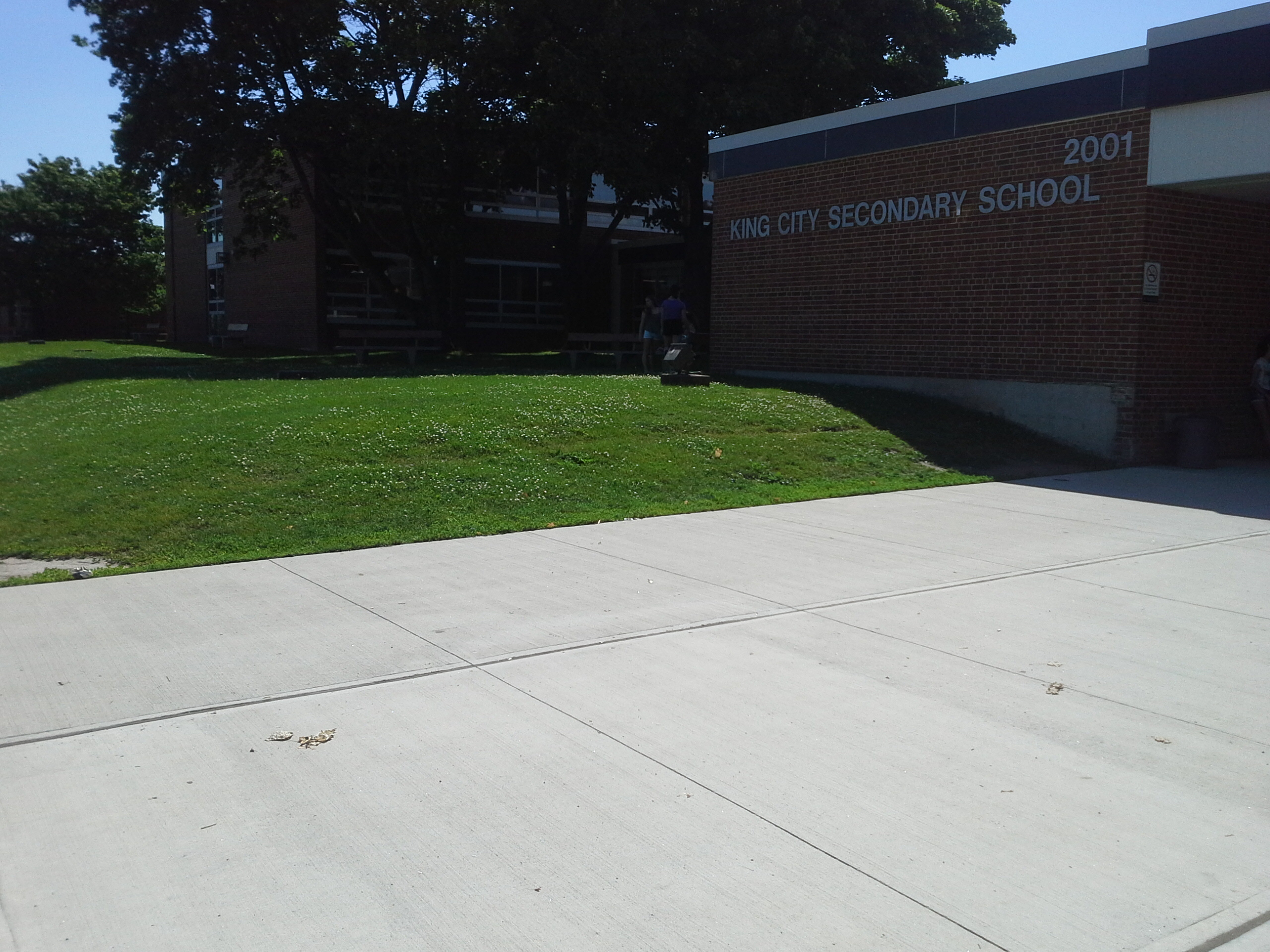
Main entrance of King City Secondary School

KCSS is located on a campus of about 18 acres across the street from the King City branch of King Township Public Library. Twelve acres of the property were owned by James Gillies as early as 1917, and sold by Ralph and Alma Gillies on 3 March 1960 to the Aurora District High School Board for CA$36,000. The six acres on the eastern part of the campus were purchased from the Albon family of Clearwater, Florida for CA$20,000 on 28 August 1962.

Designs for the building were created by the company Boigon and Associates, and the Toronto-based company Cullen Construction Company undertook construction of the main building, which began in 1960 and was completed for the September 1961 opening of the King City Composite School. Before it opened, students resident in King attended Aurora High School, which was renamed Dr. G.W. Williams Secondary School the year KCSS opened.

The school was not officially opened until a ceremony on 6 April 1962 at which M.A. Cullen presented the school's vice-principal John Turchin with an engraved key and school board representative Marvin Hunter donated a bible to the school. Major renovations to the building were implemented that year, funded with a CA$668,190 grant from the Government of Canada and CA$890,000 from the Government of Ontario. This resulted in the addition of a teacher's cafeteria in 1962 and a technical studies area in 1963, often referred to as the Tech Wing, on the southwestern part of the school. In 1966, a third gymnasium and a library were added as an eastern wing to the main building. In 1983, the school's heating system was converted to use natural gas instead of oil, partly spurred by concerns of the expected cost of heating the large structure after the 1970s energy crisis. In 1991, a new library facility was constructed adjacent to the Tech Wing, which also resulted in the creation of an inner courtyard. The north courtyard was converted to a student memorial. In 2007, construction of a new science department was completed.

The school has an outdoor 400 m track, which encircles a Canadian football field, on the western part of its campus, and a soccer pitch on the eastern part of its campus. Both fields serve multiple functions, including lacrosse, track and field, rugby union and field hockey. During the summer, they are used by youth sports leagues in King City. From the summer of 2011 to the end of the 2011-2012 school year, the west field was redeveloped. New grass was added, the track was repaved, a fence installed around it, and multi-use goal posts suitable for football, soccer, and field hockey were installed.

== Boundaries and demographics ==
KCSS serves a geographically large area, since there are many sparsely populated communities in that area. Student enrolment has ranged from 750 to 1600. The primary boundary is similar to the township boundaries for King, though a small area in the northeast of King is served by schools in Aurora. Additionally, the eastern part of Oak Ridges, west of Yonge Street to the King town line, and parts of northern Vaughan, including Maple and Kleinburg and nearby communities, are served by KCSS.

In 2006, the student body comprised residents from the following communities:

- Maple (30%)
- King City (17%)
- Nobleton (15%)
- Woodbridge (11%)
- Kettleby (9%)
- Schomberg (7%)
- Kleinburg (6%)
- Other (5%)

Its current boundaries are all King township, and a portion of Oak Ridges west of Yonge Street south of 15th Sideroad.

== Curriculum ==
King City Secondary School follows the curriculum standards set by the Ontario Ministry of Education. Additionally, the school offers:

- the English as a Second Language Program
- the Alternative Education Program
- the Music Program
- the High Performance Athlete Program
- the Leadership Program
- a variety of Special Education Programs

King City Secondary School is a semestered school; for each of the fall and winter semesters, students register for up to four courses. Each day has four 75-minute periods, with a lunch period between the second and third academic periods.

On the Education Quality and Accountability Office mathematics evaluation, 88% of the school's grade 9 students in the academic track (that is, those intending to pursue tertiary education) and 49% of those in the applied track met the standard.

== Extra-curricular activities ==
King City Secondary School had an annual Marine Biology Science Trip to the Florida Keys. Established in 1990, the goal of the field trip is to demonstrate to students the relationship between ecosystems and human activity. The trip is part of the Independent Studies Program (ISP) for some senior science students, and every student is required to take daily tests and complete assignments throughout the trip.

The school has installed solar panels which connect with the school's primary power distribution system as part of a grade 10 project. This project was conducted as part of the University of Toronto Sustainable Toronto program, in conjunction with Ontario Power Generation. The solar panels also operate a pump connected to a man-made pond on the school grounds.

King City has an active drama program. In November of each year the school holds the Arthur B. Toast festival, a student-directed one-act play, often referred to as "Toast". Between 8 and 15 modern plays are performed, from comedy to drama to a little bizarre, involving around 70 students. Some of the plays are written by students.

In the spring, a more traditional play is performed to offer students the experience. Again, a large number of students are involved as actors, tech crew, stage crew, set design, makeup and costuming, and publicists. Matinees are held for the local feeder schools.

Both of these are open to the public and members of the community are encouraged to come and support a group of incredible kids. Information about these events is available by calling the school and performances are covered by 'The King Weekly'. Performances can be arranged at other settings such as retirement homes, shelters and other community homes.

== Sports ==
Sports teams from KCSS are part of the York Region Athletics Association, which coordinates all competitive sports activities in York Region.

KCSS competes and has competed in various sports including:

- Football
- Baseball
- Hockey
- Basketball
- Volleyball
- Soccer
- Ultimate Frisbee
- Golf
- Curling
- Cheerleading
- Track and Field
- Skiing

Non-competitive school intramural sports leagues, organized and scheduled by the Athletic Council and senior physical and health education students, have active participation. Most events occur during the lunch period.

The school's football teams are known as the "Lions". The junior team won the York Region championship in the 2007-2008, 2008-2009, 2009–2010 and 2014-2015.

In 1988, the school established a Talented Athlete Program, which enabled student athletes at high levels of competition to arrange a flexible study program. Initially, fifteen athletes were identified for selection to the program, primarily those with intention to succeed to national competition. It was one of several schools in the region to establish such a program; that same year, Birchmount Park Collegiate Institute in Scarborough had established the Scarborough Centre for Exceptional Athletes. By 1992, other schools in the YRDSB operating a talented athlete program were Markham District High School, Thornhill Secondary School, and Thornlea Secondary School.

== Clubs ==
King City Secondary School has a number of clubs for its students to join. Each club is formed by teachers who take their own time to give to the students, usually at lunch and sometimes after school, or even out of school.

- Green Team
- Yearbook Club
- The LA Page Turners (Book club)
- ESP
- Gay–straight alliance
- Science Olympics
- Chess Club
- Model UN
- Slam Poetry
- Band
- Student Council
- ROC-King
- Robotics
- Computer Science
- Astronomy
- Dungeons and Dragons Association

== Alumni ==
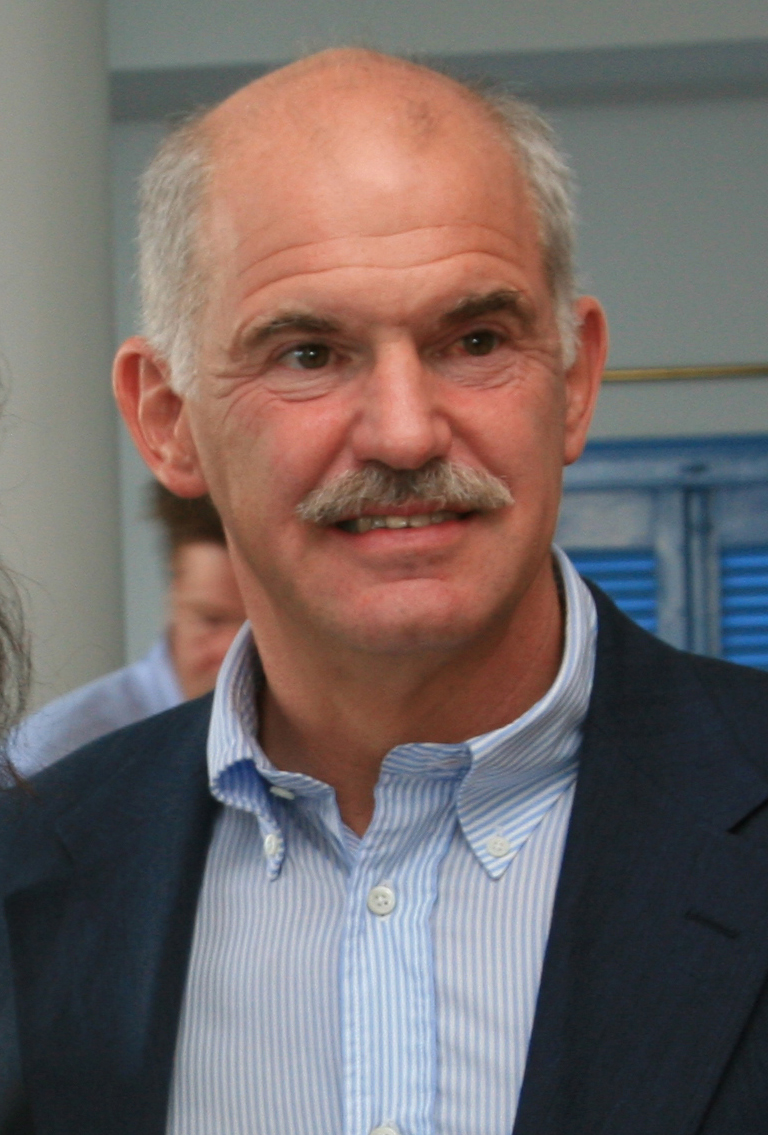
George Papandreou, 1970 graduate of King City Secondary School.

- George Papandreou graduated from King City Secondary School in 1970, which he attended only in his final year of secondary education. He served as Prime Minister of Greece, is the son and grandson of former Greek prime ministers, and was the Foreign Minister of Greece from 1999 to 2004. He was the leader of the Panhellenic Socialist Movement (PASOK) from 2004 to 2012.
- Chris Ballard is a journalist and politician who graduated from King City Secondary School. He served on the Aurora town council and was later elected the representative for the provincial electoral district of Newmarket—Aurora in the 2014 Ontario general election.
- Rasmus Lerdorf, original author of the PHP programming language, graduated from KCSS in 1988 and was an Ontario Scholar.
- Rick Hampton, a retired NHL hockey player, graduated from KCSS in 1975.
- Keith Glass, founded the country and bluegrass band Prairie Oyster in 1974, graduated from KCSS in 1972.
- Jeff O'Neill, a retired NHL hockey player, graduated from KCSS in the mid-1990s.
- Marc Costanzo, a record producer, artist, musician and songwriter graduated from KCSS in the early 1990s.
- Rosie MacLennan, Canadian trampoline gymnast and Olympic gold medalist for Canada at the 2012 Summer Olympics in London, England where she won in the individual event. Graduated from KCSS in 2006.
- Nick Shortill CFL Linebacker and McMaster University Alumni, attended and graduated from KCSS in 2010

The KCSS Alumni Association has organized school reunions quinquennially (every five years) since 1986, and has presented a student from each graduating class with a bursary of $300 since 1988. In 2002, it established a "Case of Distinction" to honour former students who have made outstanding contributions or achievements locally, nationally, or internationally.

== Film ==
The 1995 movie To Die For had a number of scenes shot at King City Secondary School. KCSS appeared as Little Hope High School in the movie. One scene featured what is now a French classroom (southeast corner of 2nd floor) as the set for the Nicole Kidman classroom scene in the movie. Joaquin Phoenix also starred in the movie and played a student who was attending classes at the school. A lottery was held for $2 per ticket to determine which attending students would be cast as extras in the scenes filmed at the school.

Walt Disney's Confessions of a Teenage Drama Queen, which debuted in 2004, also had some scenes filmed during a three-day period in July 2003 at King City Secondary School. The revenue generated from the filming rights of this movie assured sufficient capital for the construction of a new music room.

== See also ==
- Education in Ontario
- List of secondary schools in Ontario
