= Copper Sunrise =

1972 novel by Bryan Buchan

- First edition cover
- Author: Bryan Buchan
- Publisher: Scholastic
- Publication date: January 1, 1972

Copper Sunrise is a 1972 historical fiction children's novel by Canadian author Bryan Buchan. It explores issues that surrounded interactions between Europeans and Native North Americans.

== Plot ==
Jamie, a young boy from Scotland, comes to Canada in the early days of its colonization. He encounters the last of the Beothuk native people, and despite his father's warnings, befriends a native boy named Tethani. However, the settlers detest the natives and call them savages. They say that the natives are cannibals that eat each other and have permanently red skin, but Jamie learns better.

The arrival of George Wilfred Craven changes everything. He drives even more hate into the settlers and convinces them to take part in the mass murder of the natives. Jamie and Tethani work hard to trip as many traps as they can to help protect the natives but then Tethani and his family are shot and killed. At the end of the story, Jamie sees a copper sunrise and recognises this as a symbol that Tethani and his family have made it to the spirit world.
