= Bryan Buchan =

Canadian-Scottish author

- Born: 1945 (age 80–81); Aberdeen, Scotland
- Occupations: High school teacher, Retired
- Writing career
- Genres: Short Stories, Children's Stories

Bryan Buchan (born 1945) is a Canadian-Scottish author of children's stories.

Born in Aberdeen, Scotland, Buchan studied at the University of Toronto. From 1968 until 2011, Buchan taught in Richmond Hill, Ontario at Bayview Secondary School. He retired from professional teaching prior to the start of the 2011–2012 school year.

In Bayview Secondary School, he speaks English, French, and German fluently as well as a little Vietnamese which he picked up from his children. He has adopted seven children from Vietnam. One of his grandchildren is Mr. Tran, who also taught at Bayview Secondary School.

Buchan's three novels were written to interest his students in reading. Despite the fact that his stories are usually written with a young audience in mind, his plots and themes are usually concern serious social issues, such as treatment of indigenous populations, interracial friendships, and environmentalism. Buchan uses aspects of the fantastic such as fairyfolk, nature spirits and hidden magic to attract children to explore both serious and mundane real-world issues.

Buchan was also a member of Bayview's first yearbook committee.

== Bibliography ==
- The Forgotten World of Uloc (1970)
- Copper Sunrise (1972)
- The Dragon Children (1975)
