= Emily Carr Secondary School =

Location
- 4901 Rutherford Road; Vaughan, Ontario, L4H 3C2; Canada; 43°49′5″N 79°35′42″W

Information
- School type: Public school
- Motto: "Excellence with Character, Success with Support"
- Religious affiliation: Secular
- Founded: September 2003
- School board: York Region District School Board
- Superintendent: Otilia Olteanu
- Area trustee: Dr. Elizabeth Sinclair
- School number: 908819
- Principal: Tanya-Lynn Paul
- Vice Principals: Paula Borges, Nadira Lawrence-Selan
- Grades: 9-12
- Enrolment: 1317 (October 2020)
- Colours: Blue, Orange, Black, White
- Team name: Coyotes
- Website: www.emilycarr.ss.yrdsb.edu.on.ca/site.html
- Last updated: October 2021

Emily Carr Secondary School (E.C.S.S or Emily Carr) is a high school in Vaughan, Ontario, Canada, in the city's Woodbridge district. It was established on September 1, 2002, and celebrated its first graduating class in 2006. The school is administered by the York Region District School Board. Most students from this high school come from the schools near the area. For example, Fossil Hill Public School, Elders Mills Public School, Vellore Woods Public School, Lorna Jackson Public School, Pierre Berton Public School, Saint Stephen's Catholic Elementary School and a few more.

The school is named for Canadian artist and writer Emily Carr.

== Courses ==
Emily Carr Secondary School features classes in The Arts, Business, Law, Geography, History, English, French, Italian, English as a Second Language, Physical Education, Mathematics, Science, Social Sciences and Humanities, Special Education, Technologies, and Alternate Education.

== Sports ==
ECSS offers a number of sport programs to its students.

=== Fall ===
- Girls Basketball
- Boys Volleyball
- Boys Soccer
- Co-ed Tennis
- Co-ed Golf
- Co-ed Swimming

=== Winter ===
- Boys Basketball
- Girls Volleyball
- Boys Hockey
- Boys Rugby
- Co-Ed Track and field
- Boys Baseball
- Girls Softball
- Co-Ed Badminton
- Girls Soccer
- Co-Ed Ultimate Frisbee

== Clubs and activities ==
ECSS has a selection of clubs and activities (lunch and after-school) for its students.

- Gaming Club
- Student council
- Yearbook
- ECSS Music
  - Music Council
  - Stage Band (Totem)
  - Junior & Senior Concert Band
  - Jazz Choir (Rezonance)
- DECA
- PA announcement team
- Athletic council
- Math contest
- Spirit squad
- Origami club
- "Chess" club
- Drama council
- Competitive Improvisation Team: Drama Ninjas
- Web page club
- Helping Hands (Community charity)
- Career guests
- Student vs. teacher activities
- Weight room
- Art studio
- Halloween costume contest
- Student Ambassadors
- Model United Nations
- Eco Action
- Beat Club

== See also ==
- Education in Ontario
- Tommy Douglas Secondary School
- Woodbridge College
- York Region District School Board
- List of secondary schools in Ontario
