= Tommy Douglas Secondary School =

Location
- 4020 Major Mackenzie Drive; Woodbridge, Ontario, L4L 1A6; Canada; 43°50′39″N 79°34′05″W

Information
- School type: High school
- Religious affiliation: Secular
- Founded: 2015; 11 years ago
- School board: York Region District School Board
- Superintendent: Otilia Olteanu
- Area trustee: Dr. Elizabeth Sinclair
- School number: 898285
- Principal: Meshell Lynch-James
- Grades: 9–12
- Enrolment: 1,732 (31 October 2023)
- Capacity: 1,480
- Language: English
- Colours: red, grey, and white
- Mascot: Titans
- Website: www.yrdsb.ca/schools/tommydouglas.ss
- Last updated: October 2024

Tommy Douglas Secondary School (TDSS) is a secondary education facility in Woodbridge, Ontario, Canada that opened on 3 February 2015. It is named after Tommy Douglas, the seventh Premier of Saskatchewan whose government implemented North America's first single-payer, universal health care program. It is a secular public school administered by the York Region District School Board. The school is located at 4020 Major Mackenzie Drive, and its first principal was Ann Pace from 2015-2020. As of now the current principal is Sandra Sardone from 2020–present.

Before the school's opening, students attended Emily Carr Secondary School and Woodbridge College. At Woodbridge College, it operates as a "parallel, but separate" school, during which time the building at Woodbridge College was shared by two schools with separate staff and student body. It had previously maintained an office at Maple High School.

The school's boundary was approved by the YRDSB executive in January 2002, during which boundary changes for the opening of Emily Carr Secondary School and Maple High School were also approved. Because of unanticipated demographic changes in Vaughan, the school had one fewer feeder school than originally forecast by YRDSB planners. The school's boundaries are Highway 400 to the east, Rutherford Road to the south, Pine Valley Drive to the west, and the King-Vaughan town line in the north. Before opening, students residing south of Teston Road and north of Major Mackenzie Drive attended Woodbridge College, except those southwest of the area delimited by Millwood Parkway.

== See also ==
- Education in Ontario
- Emily Carr Secondary School
- Woodbridge College
- York Region District School Board
- List of secondary schools in Ontario
