= Woodbridge College =

- Woodbridge College Wyverns logo.

Location
- 71 Bruce Street; Vaughan, Ontario, L4L 1J3; Canada; 43°46′46.976″N 79°34′52.868″W

Information
- Type: Public
- Motto: Excellentia per dedicationem (Excellence through commitment)
- Religious affiliation: Secular
- Founded: 1958, as Woodbridge High School
- Status: Open
- Locale: Woodbridge, Vaughan, Ontario
- School board: York Region District School Board
- Principal: Michelle Randall
- Grades: 9 to 12
- Enrolment: 523 (October 31, 2016)
  - Grade 9: 107
  - Grade 10: 102
  - Grade 11: 114
  - Grade 12: 169
  - Other: 31
- Language: English and French
- Schedule type: Semester
- Hours in school day: 6 hours and 20 minutes (8:55 to 15:15)
- Mascot: Wyvern
- Nickname: Woodbridge College Wyverns
- Website: www.yrdsb.ca/schools/woodbridgecollege/Pages/default.aspx
- Last updated: April 18, 2017

Woodbridge College is a secondary school in Vaughan, Ontario, Canada. It is located in the Woodbridge district, from where it gets its name; and opened its doors in 1958 as Woodbridge High School when Woodbridge was still an independent village, and remained a public secondary school until 1991, when it became an alternative school, changing its name to Woodbridge College, with students in grades 7-OAC. In 2000, Woodbridge College's alternative school status ended and it returned to being a public secondary school with grades 9 to 12. The school's name as "Woodbridge College" remains unchanged to present day. The school's current enrolment is approximately 523 students. During the 2015 to 2016 school year, Fraser Institute ranked the school at 279 out of 740 in Ontario.

== Holding School Designation (2014-2015) ==
During the first semester of the 2014 to 2015 school year, the school was designated as a holding school for students planning on attending Tommy Douglas Secondary School. This was due to the planned opening of the school in February 2015 to coincide with the start of semester two (both Woodbridge College and Tommy Douglas Secondary School operate through a two-semester timetable). To accommodate both schools, the capacity of Woodbridge College was increased from 828 to 1106 through the installation of twelve portables on the school grounds. The students that were enrolled at Tommy Douglas Secondary School were eventually relocated to the new facilities at the start of semester two. Students in grades 11 and 12 as of September 2014, that were located in Tommy Douglas Secondary School holding area, continued to attend Woodbridge College until graduation.

== French Immersion Program ==
In September 2015, the York Region District School Board introduced a French Immersion Program at Woodbridge College in addition to its current "English-speaking" courses. This designated the school as an official "Dual Track School." In the lead-up to the program's introduction at the school, the French Immersion boundary for Hodan Nalayeh Secondary School was adjusted to allow for a new French Immersion boundary that would be served by Woodbridge College. The French Immersion Program was introduced with only grade 9 courses available during the first year. The board expanded the program by having it "grow a grade" each year after its introduction at the school. The aim of the French immersion program is students to achieve fluency in French. The 4-year French Immersion program will allow participating students to apply for courses at a college or university where the language of instruction is in French.

== FIRST Robotics Team ==
Woodbridge College features a FIRST Robotics Competition team under the name Team 6513: Wyvern Robotics. The team first participated during the 2017 game: FIRST Steamworks. Wyvern Robotics ranked 45th out of a total of 60 teams at the 2017 FRC Ontario District Championship Event held at the Hershey Centre from April 12 to April 15.

== Uniform ==
Woodbridge College is the only public secondary school in York Region where students wear uniforms, a policy which originated during its alternative school days. The uniform consists of either a white or navy blue polo shirt, grey pants, and plain black shoes. Both the pants and the polo shirts are crested with the school's Wyvern mascot. All articles of the uniform must be purchased directly from the school's designated uniform supplier. However, as of May 2023 there is no longer a uniform policy at Woodbridge College.

== See also ==
- Education in Ontario
- Emily Carr Secondary School
- Tommy Douglas Secondary School
- York Region District School Board
- List of secondary schools in Ontario
