= Huron Heights Secondary School (Newmarket) =

Location
- 40 Huron Heights Dr. Newmarket, Ontario, L3Y 3J9; Canada; 44°3′51″N 79°26′43″W

Information
- School type: High School
- Motto: Reach for the Heights
- Religious affiliation: Secular
- Established: 1962
- School board: York Region District School Board
- Superintendent: Drew McNaughton
- Area trustee: Loralea Carruthers; Martin Van Beek
- Principal: Erik Gordon
- Enrolment: 1513 (October 2013)
- Team name: Warriors
- Website: www.huronheights.ss.yrdsb.edu.on.ca
- Last updated: September 2014

Huron Heights Secondary School is a public high school in the York Region District School Board which opened in 1962. Additions were added in 1965 and 1969. It is located in Newmarket, Ontario, Canada and serves students from the Newmarket and East Gwillimbury area.

The name comes from the First Nation that inhabited the area and the height of land on which the school is located in the northwest part of the town. It also began to share the Newmarket-area enrichment program with Newmarket High School in 2000.

The 2005 student population was approximately 1,850, in grades 9-12. The floor area is approximately 20 900 m².

== Feeder schools ==
- Glen Cedar Public School
- Meadowbrook Public School
- Prince Charles Public School
- Mount Albert Public School
- Sharon Public School

(Among Others)

== Notable alumni ==
- Jeff Beukeboom, former Stanley Cup winning NHL defenseman attended Huron Heights while playing for the Newmarket Flyers of the Ontario Provincial Junior "A" league
- Veronica Brenner, a graduate, won a silver medal in freestyle skiing at the 2002 Winter Olympics
- Jim Brennan, professional Football (soccer) player, member of the Canada national team, first player of the Toronto FC franchise, and played in the FA Premier League
- Curtis Joseph, long-time NHL goalie
- Sam Reid, songwriter producer was the keyboard player for Glass Tiger
- Dhane Smith, professional lacrosse player for the Buffalo Bandits of the NLL
- Tyler Stewart of the band Barenaked Ladies attended Huron Heights between 1980 and 1986, and was Head Boy and active in various school bands and the music program.
- Matt Sweeney and Travis Stokl, founding members of indie pop band, The Elwins
- Corey Watman, professional CFL football player, 2-time Grey Cup champion.
- Greg Alsop, professional drummer and member of the band Tokyo Police Club
- Peter McGillivray, Operatic Baritone and winner of the 2003 CBC/Radio-Canada Young Performers Award

== See also ==
- Education in Ontario
- List of secondary schools in Ontario
- St. Elizabeth Catholic High School
- Westmount Collegiate Institute
- Unionville High School
- York Region District School Board
