= Maple High School (Maple, Ontario) =

Location
- 50 Springside Road; Maple, Ontario, L6A 2W5; Canada; 43°50′25″N 79°31′51″W

Information
- School type: High school
- Motto: Working Together Toward Student Success
- Religious affiliation: Secular
- Opened: September 2001; 25 years ago
- School board: York Region District School Board
- Superintendent: Grant Fawthrop
- Area trustee: Nadeem Mahmood
- School number: 951714
- Principal: Patrick McQuade
- Grades: 9–12
- Enrolment: 1,592 (31 October 2024)
- Capacity: 1,264
- Language: English
- Campus size: 17 acres (6.9 ha)
- Campus type: Suburban
- Colours: Sky Blue; Ultramarine
- Mascot: Timberwolf
- Team name: Timberwolves
- Website: www.yrdsb.ca/schools/maple.hs
- Last updated: October 2024

Maple High School (MHS) is a high school in Maple, Ontario, Canada. The current principal of Maple High School is Patrick McQuade. In 2017, it became an International Baccalaureate World School along with Milliken Mills High School, Dr. G.W. Williams Secondary School and Alexander Mackenzie High School.

== Sports teams ==
As of 2017 Maple High School has offered the following sports teams:

- Senior and Junior Girls Basketball
- Senior and Junior Boys Basketball
- Varsity Boys Soccer
- Senior and Junior Girls Volleyball
- Senior and Junior Boys Volleyball
- Co-Ed Volleyball
- Varsity Girls Flag football
- Varsity Boys Baseball
- Cricket
- Badminton
- Tennis
- Golf
- Cross country
- Track and field
- Alpine skiing and Snowboarding
- Rock climbing
- Ultimate Frisbee
- Ice hockey
- Swimming

== Notable alumni ==
- Adam Mascherin - ice hockey player

== See also ==
- Education in Ontario
- List of secondary schools in Ontario
