= Middlefield Collegiate Institute =

Coordinates: 43°50′51″N 79°15′59″W

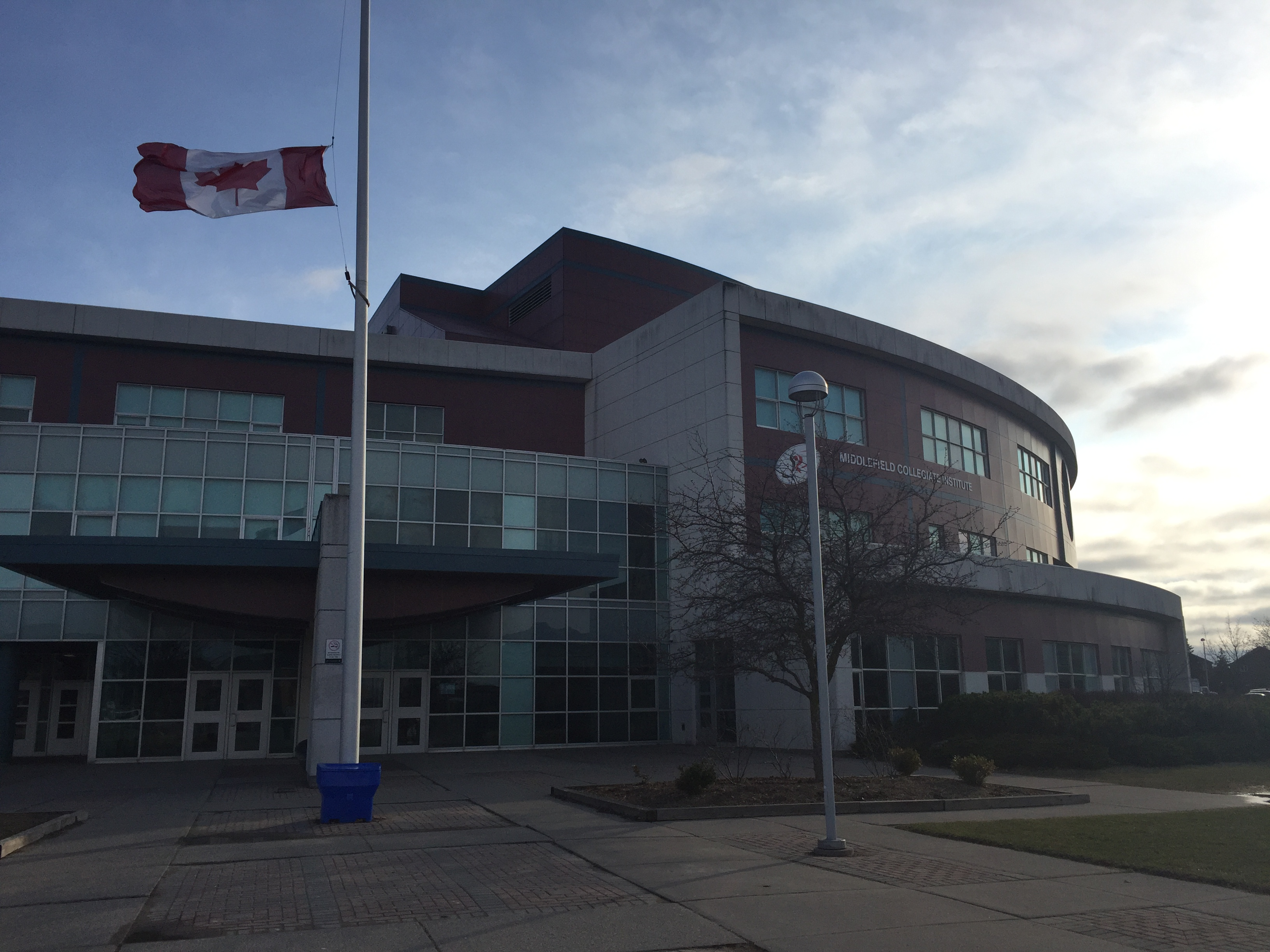

Location
- 525 Highglen Avenue; Markham, Ontario, L3S 3L5; Canada

Information
- School type: High school
- Motto: "High Expectations, High Achievement"
- Religious affiliation: Secular
- Founded: 1992
- School board: York Region District School Board
- Superintendent: Rashmi Swarup
- Area trustee: Michael Chen
- Principal: Arlene Higgins-Wright
- Grades: 9-12
- Enrolment: 1287 (October 2021)
- Language: English
- Colour
- Mascot: Silver Hawk
- Team name: Middlefield Silver Hawks
- Feeder schools: Markham Gateway PS, Coppard PS, Parkland PS, Armadale PS, Ellen Fairclough PS, Cedarwood PS
- Website: middlefield.ci.yrdsb.edu.on.ca Alumni
- Last updated: September 2014

Middlefield Collegiate Institute (MCI) is a semestered, public high school in the neighbourhood of Armadale in the city of Markham, Ontario, Canada. It is part of the York Region District School Board. It is located in southeast Markham, bordered by the major arteries McCowan Road to the west, Steeles Avenue to the south, Markham Road to the east and 14th Avenue to the North.

== History ==
Middlefield Collegiate Institute was built in 1992 to feed the ever growing East Milliken community which is a suburban area. Initially as the community was growing, the enrolment was low but as the suburbs bloomed, more and more students began to enrol.

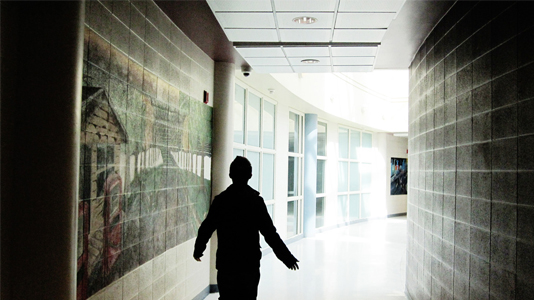
One of MCI's several art filled hallways

In 2009, Middlefield had its first major expansion, building a tech wing with six new classrooms in the Southern Wing. It houses the Auto, Construction, Hairstyling tech classes, and some Applied English classes and Communication Tech classes.

In 2013, factors such as a large exiting class and small entering class caused a surplus in teachers, resulting in 17 of them being moved across the board to other schools.

In 2017, the new Aaniin Community Centre and Library was opened nearby and is frequented by students as a learning space and for social activities.

== Programs ==
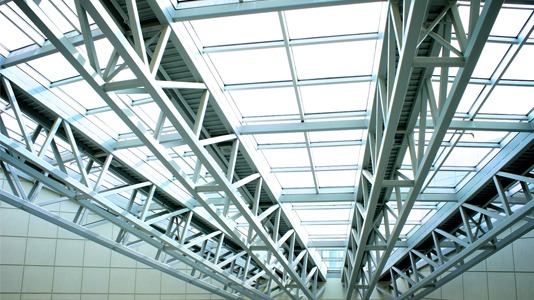
The MCI Rotunda

MCI has the widest array of Tech courses in South-east York Region. MCI offers Automotive Technology, Transportation Technology, Construction Technology, Design Technology, Computer Technology, Hairstyling and Aesthetic Technology, Communication Technology, Information Technology, Business Technology and Wood Shop. Other than that, the school also provides;

- Alternative Education Program
- English as a Second Language Program
- Specialist High Skills Major in Transportation Technology and Health and Wellness
- Special Education Programs
- Co-op Education Program

MCI stopped offering Advanced Placement courses in 2016, which had been offered in Science, Math and Technology.

== Athletics ==
=== Athletic Council ===
Middlefield Athletic Council (MAC) coordinates and funds athletic events such as the athletic banquet. This club allows the students to realize the importance of physical education by promoting healthy living through school events, with the help of the student council.

=== Teams and sports clubs ===
- Badminton - Junior/Senior
- Baseball - Varsity Boys
- Basketball - Junior/Senior Boys & Junior/Senior Girls
- Cross Country - Varsity
- Cricket - Varsity Boys
- Field Hockey - Varsity Girls
- Rock Climbing - Varsity
- Soccer - Junior/Senior Boys & Junior/Senior Girls
- Slo-pitch - Varsity Girls
- Track and Field - Varsity
- Ultimate Frisbee - Varsity Coed
- Volleyball - Junior/Senior Boys & Junior/Senior Girls

Middlefield was the only York Region school to win the soccer championship two years in a row, which started with the junior boys of 2003-2004.

Middlefield's Senior and Junior Boys Basketball teams both won the 2015 York Region Athletic Association Tier 2 Basketball championship.

=== Intramural sports ===
In addition to competitive sports teams, Middlefield students have the opportunity to participate in in-school sporting events such as:

- Middlefield Intramural Hockey Association (MIHA)
- Middlefield's Basketball Association (MBA)
- Middlefield's Iron Person

=== Mock Trial Team ===
The Middlefield Mock Trial Team, led by Law teachers Mr. Glass and Ms. Mobilos and Mr. Draycott, have been the most successful team from this school. Over the past twelve years, it has made the Elite 8 in Ontario each time, including four silver medals, the last coming in the 2010-2011 year. Middlefield Collegiate Institute is one of the few public high schools which have made it this far in the championship and is the most successful mock trial team from a public high school in Ontario. Middlefield again made the Elite 8 in 2013, winning the GTA South Regionals. Middlefield followed this up by winning the Ontario Bar Association Mock Trial Tournament and becoming Provincial Champions for the first time, defeating Cawthra Park Secondary School.

== Facilities ==
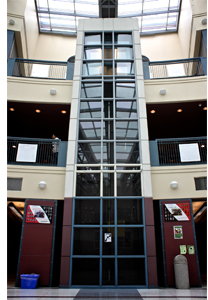
The elevator at MCI

MCI has a large glass ceiling in the rotunda, which is renovated biennially, to check for possible hazards and risks, and to replace any cracked or possible dangerous glass. This glass ceiling can be seen from almost anywhere in the central section of the school, and is a staple of Middlefield culture. The ceiling also gives in light and provides it for the central wing as well, thus helping reduce MCI's environmental impact, and is one of the reasons MCI was certified a Silver Eco School.

MCI is atrium shaped, and from the first floor of the rotunda, can look up and see the third floor. There is also a glass elevator which provides travel between the three floors, but can only be used by staff or students who have disabilities.

As the local community continued to grow, MCI required an extension of the building to accommodate for the growing student body. In June 2008, construction began to create an extended west wing to the school. The wing is only one storey high, and consists of a hairstyling classroom, construction classroom, garage, two washrooms, and an emergency exit.

- Anime club
- Art Labs
- Wood Shop
- Cafeteria
- Communication Technological Labs
- Family Studies Labs
- SAC Office
- Drama Stage
- Gymnasiums
- Food Lab
- Guidance Office
- Outdoor - Baseball Diamond, Soccer Fields, Running Track
- Music Room
- Weight Room
- Photography Dark Room
- Library
- Hairstyling
- Auto Shop
- Rock Climbing Wall

== Academics ==
Middlefield Collegiate is ranked 102 of 689 Ontario high schools on the 2022 Fraser Institute school report, with an overall rating of 7.7 out of 10. The percentage of eligible students who passed their Ontario Secondary School Literacy Test on the first attempt was 87.4%.

== Principals ==
1. Ken Cluely 1992-1995
2. Jim Gilliland 1995-1998
3. Cecil Roach 1998-2002
4. Gary Micheal 2002-2004
5. Tony Lewis 2005-2008
6. Annette Oliver 2008-2012
7. Peter Tse 2012-2014
8. Janani Pathy 2014-2017
9. Aline Daniel 2017-2022
10. Arlene Higgins-Wright 2022–Present

== Feeder schools ==
The following elementary schools are part of the Middlefield Collegiate Institute family of schools. Every year, the Guidance Department visits each of these schools to talk to eight graders about courses and enrolment:

- Markham Gateway Public School
- Armadale Public School
- Ellen Fairclough Public School
- Coppard Glen Public School
- Parkland Public School
- Cedarwood Public School

== Notable staff ==
- Michael Morin (2000-2025), winner of the Ontario Association for Mathematics Education Exceptional and Creative Teaching Award (Retired Mathematics Teacher)
- Julia Munro (1992-1994), Member of Provincial Parliament for York-Simcoe and former Cabinet Minister. (Former History Teacher)

== Notable alumni ==
- Justyn Warner, Canadian Olympian and Canadian 100m Record Holder, 3rd place 2012 Summer Olympics, earned Bronze at World Championships in Athletics
- Stephen Weiss, Hockey player with the Florida Panthers and Detroit Red Wings

== See also ==
- Education in Ontario
- List of secondary schools in Ontario
