= Aurora High School (Ontario) =

Location
- 155 Wellington Street West; Aurora, Ontario, L4G 2P4; Canada; 43°59′49″N 79°28′47″W

Information
- School type: High school
- Motto: Fly High
- Religious affiliation: Secular
- Founded: 1972
- School board: York Region District School Board
- Superintendent: Neil Gunathunge
- Area trustee: Peter Adams-Luchowski
- School number: 892998
- Principal: Debbie Linkewich
- Grades: 9-12
- Enrolment: 1445 (October 2018)
- Language: English and French immersion
- Colours: Red and gold
- Mascot: The Eagle
- Website: www.yrdsb.ca/schools/aurora.hs/Pages/default.aspx
- Last updated: June 2015

Aurora High School is one of five high schools in Aurora, Ontario, and is one of two under the jurisdiction of the York Region District School Board. It serves students from Grades 9 to 12. Aurora High School has a strong French immersion program, and used to serve as the feeder school for many local French immersion public schools, however as of the 2019–2020 school year, the only French immersion elementary school is Lester B. Pearson PS in Aurora. This includes Aurora, Whitchurch-Stouffville, Oak Ridges, and King City

According to the 2025 Fraser Institute, Aurora ranks 46th in Ontario and is ranked 8.4/10.

== History ==
The original Aurora High School was built in 1888 on Wells Street. This building was rebuilt in 1923. Parts of this school building are incorporated into the Wells Street Lofts residential complex. The high school student population eventually outgrew the Wells Street building and a new high school was built on Dunning Avenue. This high school, which opened in 1961 and was in operation until the 2025-2026 school year, rebuilt on Spring Farm Road (Active 2025-Present). It is called the Dr. G.W. Williams Secondary School. From 1961 to 1972 Dr. G. W. Williams Secondary School was the only high school in Aurora, Ontario. In 1972, the new Aurora High School opened at 155 Wellington Street West. It can accommodate a student population of approximately 1500 students. As of the 2017/2018 school year Aurora High School has required 4 portable classrooms to accommodate the influx of new students.

== Robotics ==
In 2012, the Robotics club won second place in the 2012 Robofest World championship in the Senior Exhibition division.

== Music department ==
The school has a strong arts program, though most of the focus is on its music program. The music department has several ensembles. These include:

- Student-led A Cappella
- Grade Nine Concert Band
- Grade Nine Jazz Band
- Grade Ten Symphonic Band
- Grade Ten Jazz Band
- Grade Eleven Wind Ensemble
- Grade Twelve Wind Symphony
- Senior Winds
- Senior Jazz Band
- Sound and Stage Crew

In addition to these ensembles, the music department also has a Music Council, in which students and teachers plan for music-related events that the department has to offer, such as:

- Halloween Social
- Santa Under the Stars Parade
- Winter Concerts
- Movie/Game Night
- Tie-Dye Night
- Coffee House
- Spring Concerts
- Music Banquet

Along with competitions, the music department travels with their students around the world to places like Washington, Cleveland, New York City, Rome, Florence, Venice, Salzburg, and Vienna every year.

== Important Alumni ==
- Alistair Johnston

== See also ==
- Education in Ontario
- List of secondary schools in Ontario
