= Pierre Elliott Trudeau High School =

Pierre Elliott Trudeau High School École secondaire Pierre-Elliott-Trudeau

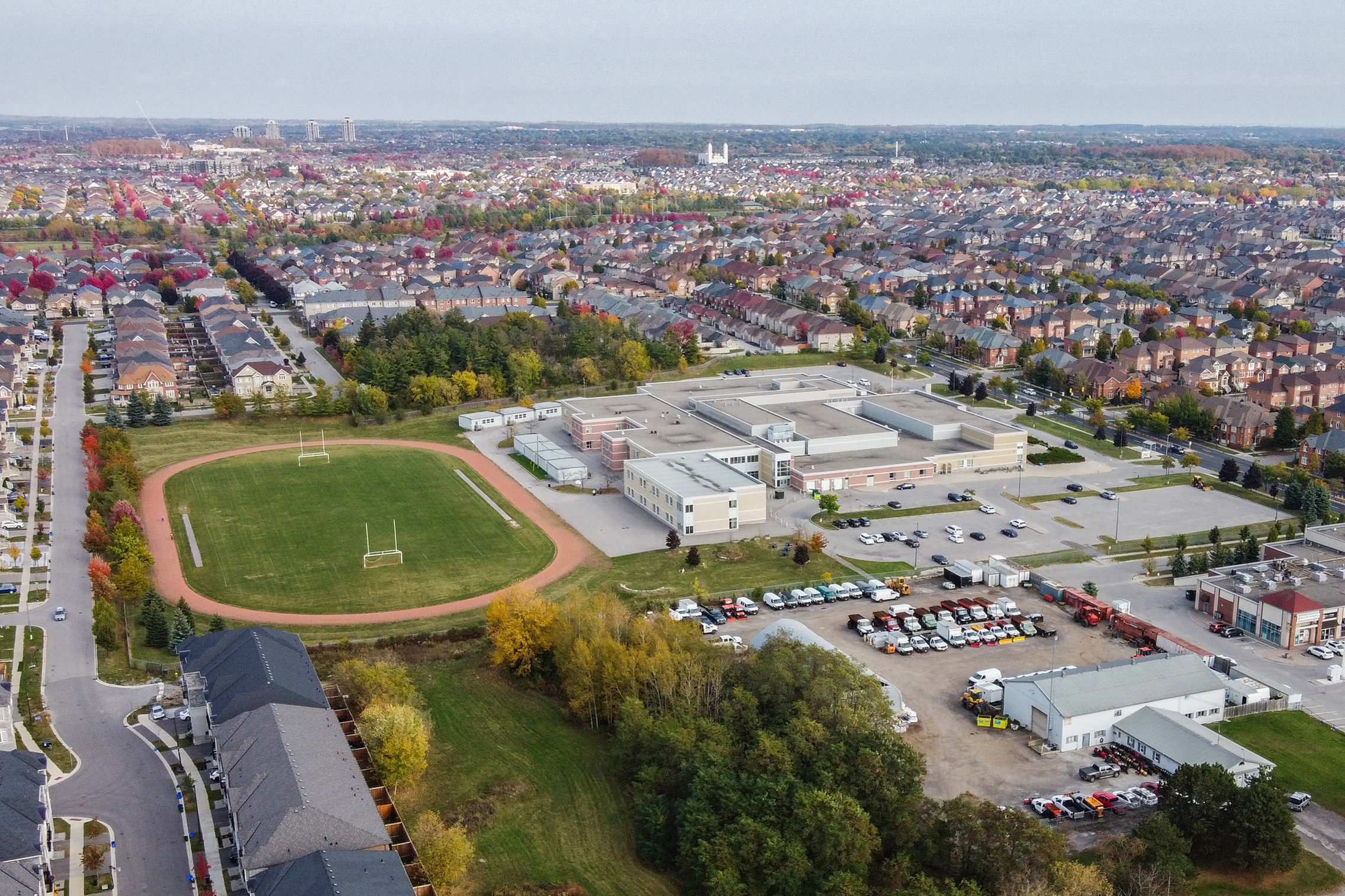

Location
- 90 Bur Oak Avenue; Markham, Ontario, L6C 2E6; Canada; 43°53′21″N 79°18′46″W

Information
- School type: Public
- Motto: Strive Higher, Soar Further
- Religious affiliation: Secular
- Founded: 2002
- School board: York Region District School Board
- Superintendent: Kandeephan Ganeshalingam
- Area trustee: Ron Lynn
- Principal: Dawn Imada-Chan
- Grades: 9–12
- Enrolment: 1745 (2023-2024)
- Colours: Yellow, white, red, and black
- Mascot: The Trailblazer
- Team name: Trudeau Trailblazers
- Website: trudeau.hs.yrdsb.ca
- Last updated: April 2024

Pierre Elliott Trudeau High School (French: École secondaire Pierre-Elliott-Trudeau, commonly known as PETHS, PET, or Trudeau) is a public, bilingual English and French-immersion secondary school in Markham, Ontario. It was named in honour of the 15th prime minister of Canada, Pierre Elliott Trudeau.

== History ==
Construction of Pierre Elliott Trudeau HS commenced in June 2001. The school opened on September 3, 2002 with 500 students in grade 7, 8, 9 and 10. The grade 7 and 8 students were from Castlemore Public School, a designated feeder school, and were segregated from the high school students. The Class of 2005 was the first graduating class.

== Location and feeder schools ==
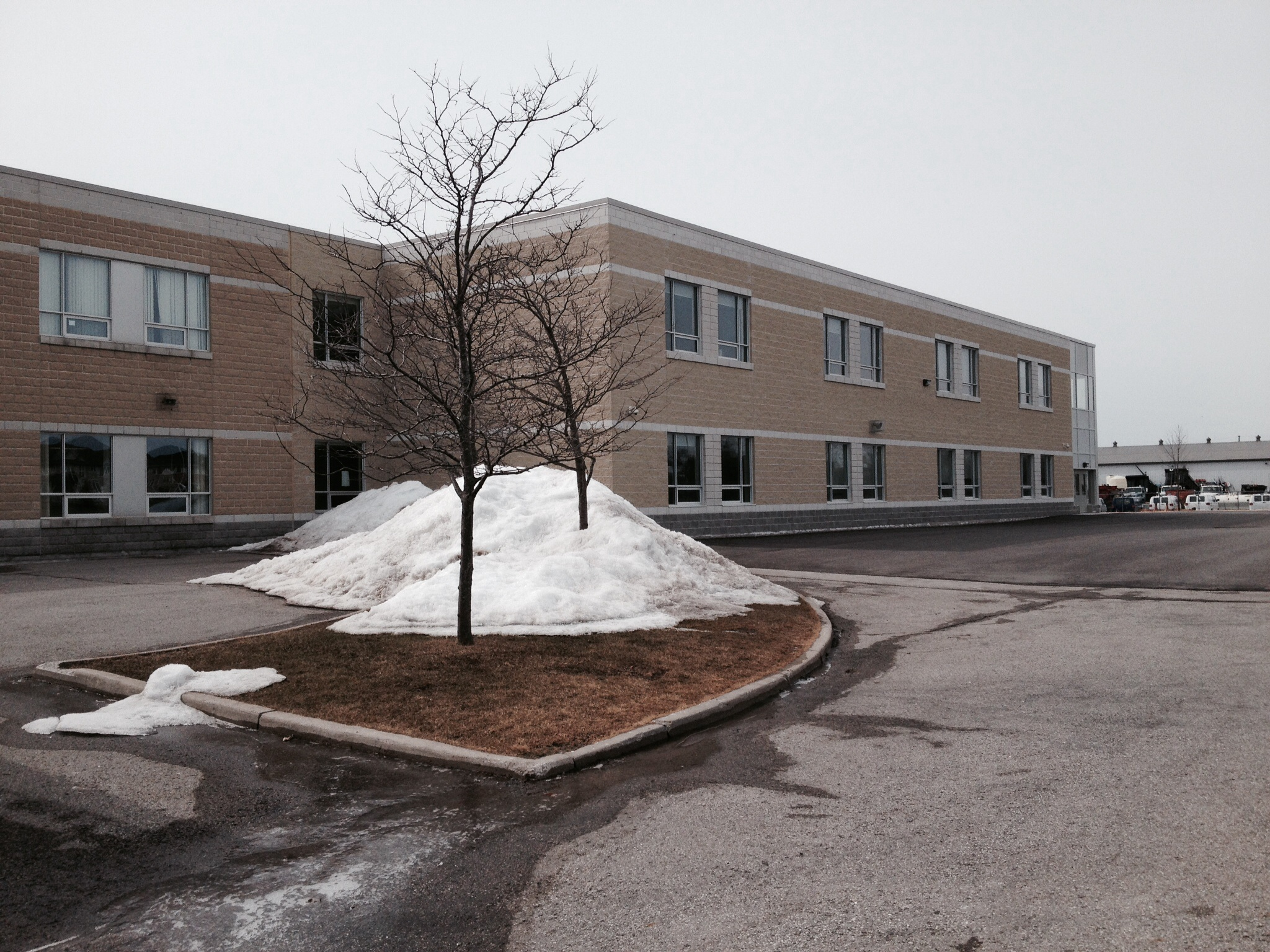
The extension of the school, completed in September 2013

Located in northern Markham between Major Mackenzie Dr. and 16th Avenue on Kennedy and Bur Oak Avenue, Trudeau is a part of the York Region District School Board, Trudeau primarily serves students who reside in northern Unionville, which include the communities of Cachet, Angus Glen, and Berczy Village. Trudeau also serves students in the French-immersion program who live in the communities of Stouffville, and most of the City of Markham. During the school year of 2017–2018, the opening of Bill Hogarth Secondary School resulted in mandatory transfers from approximately half of the French immersion students at Trudeau.

PETHS's feeder schools include:

- Ashton Meadows P.S.
- Beckett Farm P.S.
- Castlemore P.S.
- Stonebridge P.S.
- Milliken Mills P.S. (French immersion)
- Sir Wilfrid Laurier P.S. (French immersion)

== Academics ==
Trudeau offers Specialist High Skills majors in business, health & wellness, and arts & culture.

As of 2024 the Fraser Institute Report Card on Secondary Schools gave PET an overall rating of 9.5, ranking it 6th out of 747 schools in Ontario.

== School events ==
=== Academic ===
The side of the school

PETHS has historically participated in and excelled at the McMaster University Engineering Olympics, winning in multiple events. Since 2005, they have participated in the York Region Science Olympics and have ranked in the top 7. Since 2004, its students have entered the University of Toronto Biology Contest and have placed in the top third of all international schools to participate. The school also regularly participates in the Sir Isaac Newton Physics Contest and University of Waterloo Canadian Mathematics Competition. Trudeau's music department has advanced to the Gold Level at the OBA competitions. PETHS's Computer Science Club won the YRDSB ECOO Programming Competition in 2016 and 2017.

== See also ==
- Education in Ontario
- List of secondary schools in Ontario
