= Signature line of credit =

A signature line of credit is a revolving line of credit that is not backed by collateral; i.e., the sole criterion for the decision to grant the loan and establish the terms thereof is an assessment of the customer's credit rating. Also known as an unsecured line of credit.

== See also ==
- Home equity line of credit
- Line of credit
