= The Forgotten World of Uloc =

Canadian children's book

- First edition
- Author: Bryan Buchan
- Language: English
- Publisher: Scholastic-Tab Publications
- Publication date: 1970

The Forgotten World of Uloc is a short children's fantasy novel by Canadian author Bryan Buchan. First published in 1970 by Scholastic-Tab Publications, it features black-and-white line drawings of key scenes by Canadian artist Kathryn Cole.

The Forgotten World of Uloc is a tale of a young boy's discovery of a world of magic and nature spirits that are currently threatened by pollution.
