= Stouffville District Secondary School =

Location
- 801 Hoover Park Drive; Stouffville, Ontario, L4A 0A4; Canada; 43°57′44″N 79°15′36″W

Information
- School type: Secondary school
- Religious affiliation: Secular
- Founded: 1954
- School board: York Region District School Board
- Superintendent: Liz Davis
- Area trustee: Elizabeth Terrel
- Principal: Melissa Schmidt
- Grades: 9 to 12
- Enrolment: 1,191 (October 2019)
- Language: English
- Colours: Maroon and White
- Mascot: Spartans
- Website: www.yrdsb.ca/schools/stouffvilledistrict.ss/Pages/default.aspx
- Last updated: February 2021

Stouffville District Secondary School (SDSS) is a public secondary school, and is the only secondary school located in the Town of Whitchurch–Stouffville that is administered by the York Region District School Board.

== History ==
Stouffville District Secondary School officially opened in 1954. It had additions built onto the original school four times in the 1960s because its capacity was not able to maintain the pace of the population growth in the Stouffville area. The school opened its new location at Hoover Park Drive and Weldon Road in September 2007. The new location features a double gymnasium and an environmentally sustainable design. S.D.S.S is a gold certified eco-school, which includes a 24-hour control system that is used to turn down temperature and ventilation requirements during unoccupied hours. The school also has non-toxic, low-odour paints and carpeting, Energy Star-rated electrical equipment, roof and insulation materials, and an outdoor classroom.

== See also ==
- Education in Ontario
- List of secondary schools in Ontario
