= Bur Oak Secondary School =

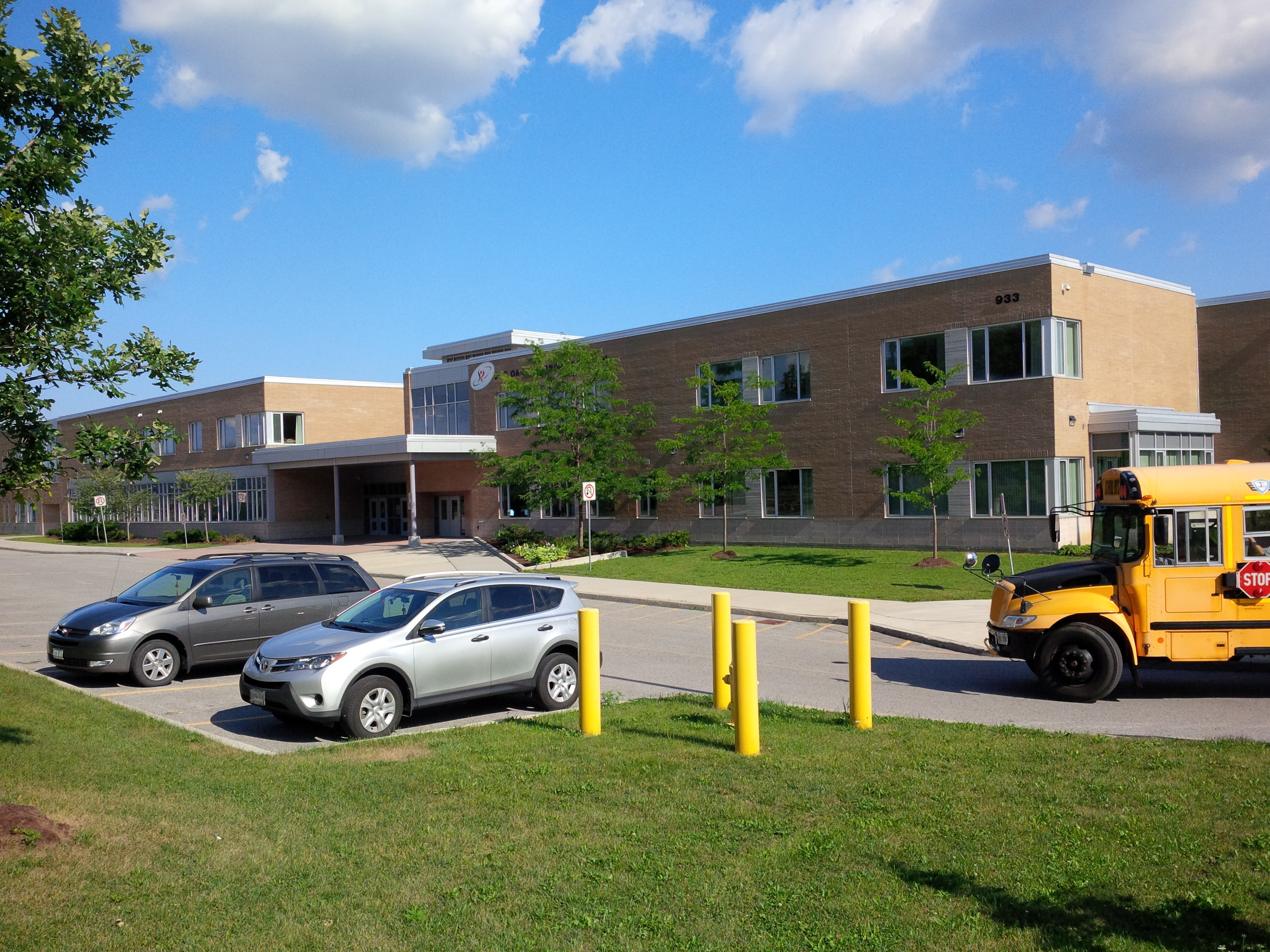

Location
- 933 Bur Oak Avenue; Markham, Ontario, L6E 1G4; Canada; 43°53′50″N 79°16′43″W

Information
- School type: Public, high school
- Founded: 2007
- School board: York Region District School Board
- Superintendent: Elizabeth Lau
- Area trustee: Allan Tam
- School number: 933346
- Principal: Louis Lim
- Grades: 9–12
- Enrolment: 1580 (October 2018)
- Language: English
- Colours: Royal blue, gold, white, black
- Mascot: Biggie the Bulldog
- Team name: Bur Oak Bulldogs
- Website: www.yrdsb.ca/schools/buroak.ss/
- Last updated: September 2022

Bur Oak Secondary School (BOSS) is a public secondary school in Markham, Ontario, Canada established in 2007, and is part of the York Region District School Board. The school was named after the road which it is built on, which in turn is named for the city of Markham's official tree, the Bur oak. As of 2018, the school has a student population of approximately 1900.

== History ==
Bur Oak Secondary School opened in September 2007 with only two grades (9 & 10). Bur Oak held its 'official' opening ceremony on May 1, 2008 followed by an open house. The school now has a total student population of over 1,900, the most in the school's history. The school's official colours consist of royal blue, gold, white, and black.

== Academics ==
Bur Oak Secondary School is noted for its strong academic performance. According to the 2024 ranking of Ontario secondary schools, Bur Oak ranks 11th out of 746 high schools in the province. Bur Oak Secondary School ranks 2nd academically in Markham.

Bur Oak Secondary School's academic excellence is also reflected in their "[The University of] Waterloo Adjustment Factor" rating, valued at a -9.8 in 2023 and -11.3 in 2024.

The school offers a unique four-year core French program with intensive focus is placed on global French culture, music and history, in addition to grammar and structure.

The school also offers a Specialist High Skills Major (SHSM) program. As of the 2025–2026 school year, the program is offered in five specializations:

- Arts & Culture
- Business
- Energy
- Health & Wellness
- Non-Profit

The program provides students with valuable skills and certifications related to their specialization and career path, and is completed in the final two years of high school.

In addition, Bur Oak offers a number of AP courses as of the 2025–2026 school year:

- Grade 11 Functions (University)
- Grade 12 Calculus and Vectors (University)
- Grade 12 Advanced Functions (University)

== Awards ceremony ==
At its annual awards ceremony in September, the school recognizes the academic achievement of students with the following awards:

1. Honour Roll: These recipients have earned an overall average of at least 80%.
2. Subject Award: These recipients have shown initiative in a specific course. However, unlike the vast majority of schools that give the award to the student earning the highest mark and the strongest performance, BOSS requires a mark of at least 75%.
3. Principal's Award: This award is given to the three students earning the highest academic average in each grade.

As of the 2011–12 school year, only subject awards are given each semester; the Honour Roll and Principal's Award recipients are currently determined based on their marks from throughout the whole school year instead of the previously established semester marking.

== Extracurricular activities ==
Bur Oak Secondary School boasts a variety of student-led organizations and clubs and holds several student events throughout the year. Notably, it holds an annual back-to-school barbeque, Bossilicious in September, and a Summer Carnival in late May. In addition, the school also hosts dances, movie nights, and coffeehouses that are organized by Student Activity Council, satellite councils, academic departments, or student clubs.

As of the 2025–2026 school year, Grade 12 students enrolled in the Hospitality and Tourism course (TFJ4C1) plan and create their own restaurant on school grounds nearing the end of the respective semester. Other students are welcome to make reservations and have dinner when available.

=== Student Activity Council ===
Many student events are coordinated by Student Activity Council (SAC). Student Activity Council is an umbrella organization that derives its membership from the Co-Directors of the seven satellite councils:

- Student Events Council
- Athletic Council
- Business Council
- Equity Council
- Music Council
- Community Council
- Global Action Council
- International Student Association

Student Activity Council is led by two Co-Presidents that are elected by the students via direct popular vote in the preceding school year.

Satellite councils are led by two Co-Directors and an Executive team selected at the end of the preceding school year. Each of the satellite councils different interests within the school, some, like Music and Business Councils, organize extracurricular activities related to specific academic departments, while others, such as Community and Global Action are more focused on student engagement in community service and social justice.

== Transportation ==
=== School bus ===
As per the criteria of Student Transportation Service (joint school bus service for YRDSB and YCDSB), students from grade 9–12 in the YRDSB are eligible for school bus transportation if they are:

1. Living more than 3.2 km from the school (measured along safe walkways); and
2. Living in a non-transit served area. (A transit served area means that a person can get to and from school using the YRT/Viva in less than an hour, needs to walk no more than 1 km to/from the stop, and needs to take a maximum of 3 buses each way).

Students in a special education program (excluding gifted), are exempt from the policy and receive it based on a separate criteria.

=== Public transit ===
The YRT routes which stop at or near the school are:

- 18 - Bur Oak. Westbound to Angus Glen Community Centre and Library. Eastbound to Markham-Stouffville Hospital
- 402 - Bur Oak/Pierre Elliot Trudeau High School Special. Westbound to Angus Glen Community Centre and Library. Eastbound to Markham-Stouffville Hospital. Operates only during the morning and afternoon on school days.
- 45 - Mingay. Northbound to Major Mackenzie Drive East. Southbound to Markville Mall.
- 102D - Markham Road (Operated by the TTC). Northbound to Major Mackenzie Drive East then Southbound to Warden Station (Subway), an extra TTC fare is required when travelling south of Steeles.
- 129A - McCowan North (Operated by the TTC). Northbound to Major Mackenzie Drive East. Southbound to Scarborough Centre Station (Mall connecting to LRT), an extra TTC fare is required when travelling south of Steeles.

YRT fares are $4.50 in cash or debit/credit for a two-hour pass, Youth tickets (13–19) are $3.19 and are purchased through Presto (via app or mobile wallet).

== Film ==
In May 2016, the location was used in the filming of a scene in the 2017 movie Downsizing.

== See also ==
- Education in Ontario
- List of secondary schools in Ontario
