= Bayview Secondary School =

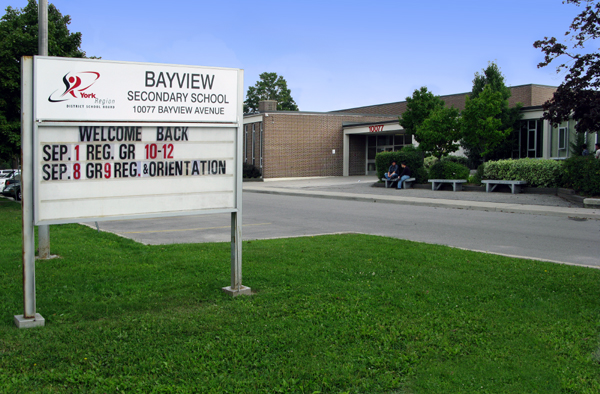

Location
- 10077 Bayview Ave; Richmond Hill, Ontario, L4C 2L4; Canada; 43°52′43″N 79°24′50″W

Information
- Former name: Bayview High School
- School type: High school International Baccalaureate World School
- Motto: A Diverse Community Learning Together
- Religious affiliation: Secular
- Founded: 1960
- School board: York Region District School Board
- Superintendent: Liz Davis
- Area trustee: Cindy Liang
- School number: 893978
- Principal: Aldrin Fernando
- Grades: 9–12
- Enrolment: 1673 (October 2019)
- Colours: Red, white and black
- Mascot: Bengal
- Team name: Bayview Bengals
- Website: www.yrdsb.ca/schools/bayview.ss/Pages/default.aspx

Bayview Secondary School, initially known as Bayview High School is a grade 9–12, 2-semester secondary school operated by the York Region District School Board. It is located just north of the northeast corner of Bayview Avenue and Major Mackenzie Drive in Richmond Hill, Ontario, Canada. Bayview S.S. was officially opened on March 19, 1961.

Bayview S.S. is named after the street on which it is located. Its 15-acre (61,000 m^{2}) area used to be part of the Elliot farm.

According to the Fraser Institute, the school ranked 9th in Ontario in a Fraser Institute ranking of all Ontario Secondary Schools in 2016-17. The school does not offer an AP program, though it does have a renowned IB program, only open to students who live in the school area. Bayview S.S. ranked second nationally in the 2011 Euclid mathematics contest for grade 12 students held by the University of Waterloo. Bayview also consistently ranks well in Computer Programming competitions such as the CCC or ECOO.

Students of Bayview S.S. come from a variety of linguistic and cultural backgrounds. In 2005, in the neighbourhood around Bayview Secondary School, about 40% of residents were of Chinese ethnic origin, 8.1% were of East Indian origin, and 5.9% were of Iranian origin.

== Enrolment ==
Bayview S.S. had over 2000 students in September 2016. The York Region District School Board had not projected such a large enrolment at the beginning of the school year. The high enrolment was attributed to the 150 walk-in students at the beginning of the school year. Moreover, it was predicted that the student population would decrease that year because a new Catholic school was opened nearby, but enrolment went up instead of down.

Many parents were concerned that Bayview's enrolment would keep rising in the near future because new condominium buildings would be completed at the Bayview and Major Mackenzie area in 2011.

Prior to 2017, Bayview S.S. was the only secondary school in the York Region District School Board offering the International Baccalaureate (IB) Programme, resulting in the high enrolment of students. Since 2017, other schools in the school board have opened their own IB programmes, allowing the school to restrict enrolment to only schools within the school boundary. Since then, enrolment has dropped significantly as students are not allowed to attend the school if they live outside of the school boundary.

== IB Programme ==
The International Baccalaureate (IB) Programme at Bayview is a competitive entry program founded 30 years ago that consists of approximately 110 students per grade living in York Region, who are selected based on their performance in a three-part entrance exam (testing mathematics, English, and French, which was replaced by a collaborative intake activity in 2019), their grade 7 final report card and a letter of teacher reference (no longer required after 2014, required again in 2016 and on). This programme targets students who are well-rounded and high achievers in all aspects of school. The entrance exam is written in the November of the students' grade 8 year, and the candidates are picked by the IB coordinators and school administration by January.

Students would first enter pre-IB and if they so choose, may take the IB Diploma Programme in their Grade 11 and 12 years.

The IB Diploma Programme at Bayview S.S. includes the following: HL (Higher Level) English A Literature, SL (Standard Level) French B, HL History, HL Economics, SL Geography (no longer offered), HL Biology, HL Chemistry, SL Biology, SL Chemistry, SL Physics, SL Mathematics, SL Theatre, SL Visual Arts, CAS (Creativity, Action, Service), and the Extended Essay, which students begin writing in their Grade 11 year and finish in their Grade 12 year. The IB Diploma Programme also includes a TOK or Theory of Knowledge course. In order to convert their 7-point IB scale marks into the percentile system in the Ontario education system, IB students are offered a mathematical conversion system. The first two years in this programme are free, but the last two years require a $3000 non-refundable fee, not eligible for a tax receipt. The school does not provide transportation for students who do not live near the school.

As of 2018, the school no longer accepts students into the IB Diploma Programme if they do not live within the school boundary. This is due to the increase of the IB Diploma Programme in nearby schools.

Virtually 100% of graduating students from the IB programme follow on with a university education. University of Toronto, University of Waterloo, Queen's University and University of Western Ontario have been some of the most popular destinations, though some graduates choose to continue their education in elite American universities, such as the Ivy League schools.

== Sports ==
Athletic teams at Bayview S.S. include volleyball, swimming, soccer, basketball, ultimate frisbee, table tennis, dragon boat, badminton, and tennis. The structure of the sports teams are that grade 9/10 students are in the "junior" team, whereas grade 11/12 students are in the "senior" team.

== Extracurricular activities ==
Bayview's DECA Club was recognized by York Region as one of the top chapters in Canada, and the club broke provincial records in terms of qualifiers for the International Conference for Developing Careers (ICDC). In 2016, DECA Ontario recognized the International trophy winners. In 2017, DECA Ontario recognized the international trophy winners at ICDC, with Bayview winning a fourth of the total number of trophies the province had won with 9 trophies.

== Surrounding area ==
Bayview S.S. is located in Ward 3 of the city of Richmond Hill. In 2005, Ward 3 had a population of 28,315. Single detached houses are the most common dwelling, comprising 79.93% of total housing in the area. Most common ethnic origins are Chinese (39.85%), East Indian (8.10%), Iranian (5.90%). Most common mother tongues are English (28.48%), Cantonese (21.47%). In 2006, 47.04% of residents of Ward 3 that were 15 years and older had some amount of university education. Most of the residents in this area are middle-class families. In 2005, 42.62% of Richmond Hill households earned $100,000 and above.

Bayview S.S. has a York Region Transit bus stop directly in front of the school that takes students south to Finch Station (TTC) in Toronto in approximately 30 minutes. There is also a bus stop within a nearby plaza that takes students west to Vaughan Mills in roughly 40 minutes.

== Notable alumni ==
- Bryan Buchan
- Kelly Ng, Miss Hong Kong 2017 top 5. TVB actress.
- Ammaar Ghadiyali, Olympian
- Trish Stratus, Wrestler
- Craig Walker
- Taylor Pendrith Professional Golfer

== Notable faculty ==
- Bryan Buchan (retired after 2010–2011 school year)
- Glenn Clark – former National Lacrosse League player and coach

== Feeder schools ==
- Bayview Hill Elementary School
- Crosby Heights Public School
- Richmond Rose Public School
- Silver Stream Public School
- Walter Scott Public School
- Sixteenth Avenue Public School
- Beverley Acres Public School

== See also ==
- Education in Ontario
- List of secondary schools in Ontario
