= York Region District School Board =

School board in Ontario, Canada

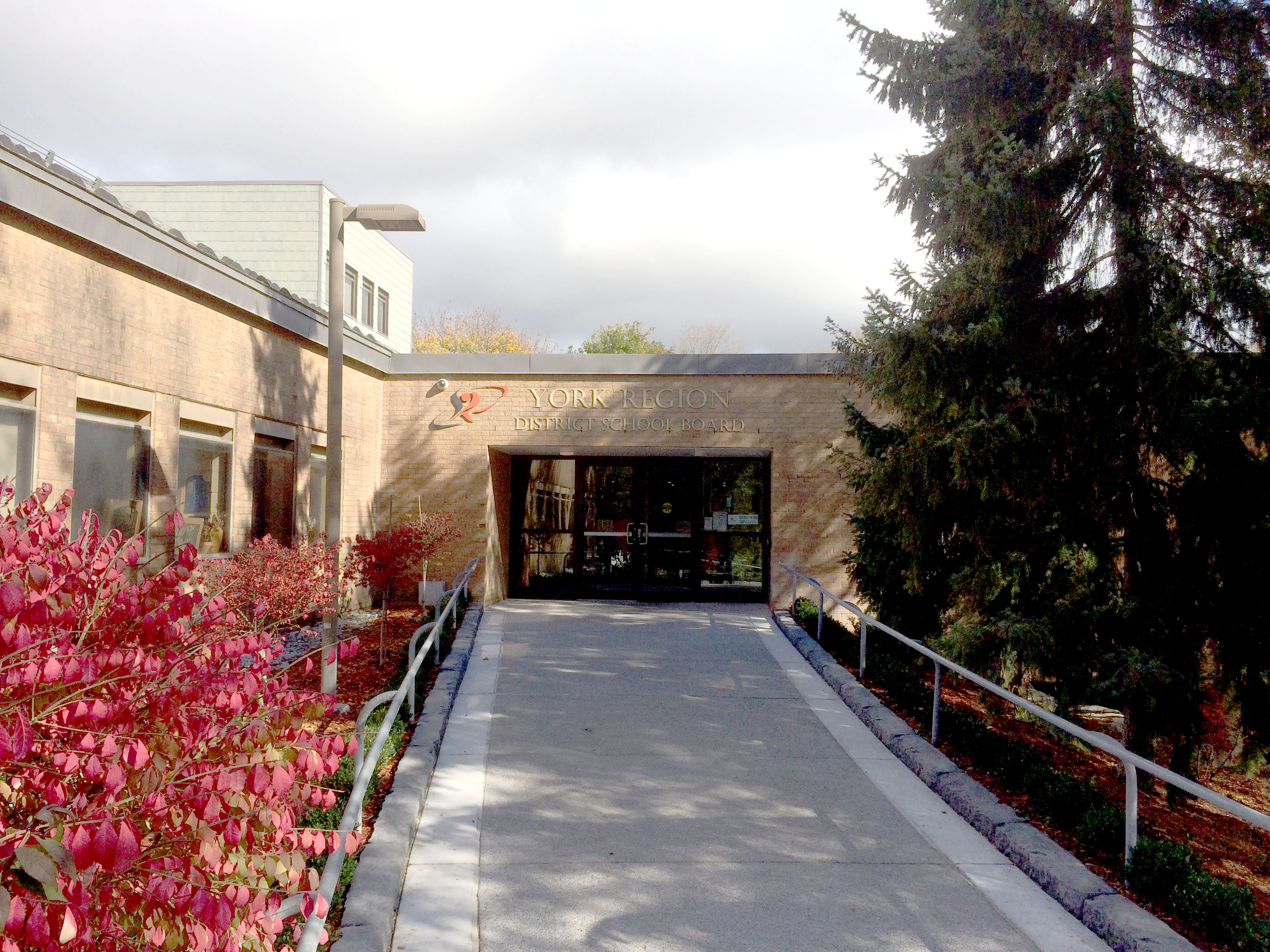
- Entrance to York Region District School Board headquarters in Aurora

Address
- 60 Wellington Street West Aurora, Ontario Regional Municipality of York Canada
- Coordinates: 43°59′58″N 79°28′16″W

District information
- Chief executive officer: Bill Cober
- Chair of the board: Ron Lynn
- Schools: 216 Total; (33 Secondary, 183 Elementary)
- Budget: CA$1,771,232,000 (2025–26)
- District ID: B66095

Other information
- Elected trustees: Melanie Wright (Aurora and Whitchurch-Stouffville); Carolyn Butterworth (East Gwillimbury and Georgina); Jenny Chen (Markham, 1 & 8); Ron Lynn (Markham, 2 & 6); Ed Law (Markham, 3 & 4); Michael Chen (Markham, 5 & 7); Pamela McCarthy (Newmarket); Robert Kolosowski (Richmond Hill, 1, 2 & 4); Cindy Liang (Richmond Hill, 3, 5 & 6); Estelle Cohen (Vaughan, 4 & 5); Nadeem Mahmood (Vaughan, 1 and King); Elizabeth Sinclair (Vaughan, 2 & 3)
- Website: https://www.yrdsb.ca/

The York Region District School Board (YRDSB), briefly the English-language Public District School Board No. 16 in 1999, is the English-language public school board for the Regional Municipality of York in Ontario, Canada. The York Region District School Board is the province's third-largest school board after Toronto's TDSB and Peel's PDSB, with an enrolment of 126,879 students. It is in the fastest-growing census division in Ontario and the third-fastest growing in Canada.

The public francophone (Conseil scolaire Viamonde), English Catholic (York Catholic District School Board), and French Catholic (Conseil scolaire catholique MonAvenir) communities of York Region also have their own publicly funded school boards and schools that operate in the same area.

== History ==
The school board was officially known as the York Region Board of Education until it changed its name in 1998 to York Region District School Board. Prior to 1971 it was called York County School Board (evolved from 1871 School Act which replacing earlier school acts in merging elementary schools (known as public schools) with higher education (collegiate Institutes and high schools that formed from Grammar School Act of 1807 and Common School Act of 1850). It was later renamed to York Region Board of Education and renamed to English-language Public District School Board No. 16 in 1998 before adopting the current York Region District School Board name in 1999.

== Governance ==
The YRDSB is governed by an elected board of trustees, whose election coincides with the municipal elections in Ontario held throughout the province every four years. The Board consists of 12 trustees, divided amongst the constituent municipalities based on population. Three student trustees are elected by students of the board. The student trustees facilitate communication between students and the school board by attending meetings in a non-voting capacity. The Chair and Vice-Chair of the Board are chosen by secret ballot of the trustees at the inaugural meeting in November.

For day-to-day corporate and financial operations the most senior staff member of the board is the Chief Executive Officer (CEO), to whom the Associate Directors and all of the Superintendents report. The CEO is appointed by the trustees; they can only be dismissed with the consent of the Minister of Education. If the CEO does not have educational qualifications, then they must appoint a Chief Education Officer (CEdO) to oversee matters related to student achievement. The current CEO is Bill Cober.

== Programs ==
Besides the curriculum established by the Government of Ontario, the York Region District School Board places heavy emphasis on its Character Matters program. As well, due to the multicultural nature, and large immigrant population of students under the YRDSB, the Board established the Race Relations Advisory Committee, a standing committee of the board to advise the trustees on issues related to ethnocultural relations. The committee is made up of trustees, staff, community members and students.

== Divisions ==
The school board is divided into four Community Education Centres (North, Central, East and West). The centres represent communities as follows:

- North: Georgina; Whitchurch-Stouffville and East Gwillimbury; Newmarket;
- Central: Aurora and King; Richmond Hill (2 trustees); and Vaughan;
- East: East Gwillimbury and Whitchurch-Stouffville; Markham (3 trustees)
- West: Vaughan (2 trustees).

The school board teaches approximately 80,000 elementary and 40,000 secondary school students.

== Lists of schools ==
=== Secondary schools ===
The school board currently manages 33 facilities that provide secondary education.

Name	Location	Founded	Enrolment	Notes
ACCESS Program Jefferson Community Learning Centre	Richmond Hill		29	Alternative school, provides learning for students with special needs
Alexander Mackenzie High School	Richmond Hill	1969	1,397	Arts specialized school, International Baccalaureate school (as of 2017)
Aurora High School	Aurora	1972	1,050	French Immersion school
Bayview Secondary School	Richmond Hill	1960	1,726	Offers gifted education,International Baccalaureate school
Bill Crothers Secondary School	Markham	2008	1,522	Athletics focused
Bill Hogarth Secondary School	Markham	2017	2,001	French Immersion school
Bur Oak Secondary School	Markham	2007	1,909	Offers various SHSM programs
Dr. G.W. Williams Secondary School	Aurora	1888	1,505	International Baccalaureate school, Relocated to Bayview Ave. in Sept. 2025
Dr. John M. Denison Secondary School	Newmarket	1989	935	
Emily Carr Secondary School	Vaughan	2003	797	
Hodan Nalayeh Secondary School	Vaughan	1989	1,056	French Immersion school
Huron Heights Secondary School	Newmarket	1962	1,322	French Immersion school, Arts specialized school
Keswick High School	Georgina	2000	942	
King City Secondary School	King Township	1961	936	French immersion school (as of September 2019)
Langstaff Secondary School	Richmond Hill	1964	563	French Immersion school
Maple High School	Maple	2002	1,583	Offers gifted education, International Baccalaureate school (as of 2017)
Markham District High School	Markham	1953	1,522	Offers gifted education, Advanced Placement Program Semestered as of September 2016
Markville Secondary School	Markham	1990	1,429	Advanced Placement Program, SHSM
Middlefield Collegiate Institute	Markham	1992	1,447	
Milliken Mills High School	Markham	1988	1,718	International Baccalaureate school (as of 2017)
Newmarket High School	Newmarket	1843	1,437	Offers gifted education, French immersion, and SHSM
Pierre Elliott Trudeau High School	Markham	2002	1,870	French immersion school
Richmond Green Secondary School	Richmond Hill	2005	1,056	
Richmond Hill High School	Richmond Hill	1851	1,552	Offers gifted education, Advanced Placement Program, and SHSM
Sir William Mulock Secondary School	Newmarket	2001	1,129	Offers blended learning and SHSM
Stephen Lewis Secondary School	Vaughan	2006	1,647	
Stouffville District Secondary School	Whitchurch-Stouffville	1954	1,356	
Sutton District High School	Georgina	1956	476	
Thornhill Secondary School	Thornhill	1955	849	Offers gifted education, Advanced Placement Program, and SHSM
Thornlea Secondary School	Thornhill	1968	1,241	Offers French Immersion, Advanced Placement Program, ACAM program, and SHSM.
Tommy Douglas Secondary School	Vaughan	2015	1,515	
Unionville High School	Markham	1985	1,638	Offers an Arts specialized program and SHSM in arts & culture or business.
Westmount Collegiate Institute	Vaughan	1995	1,080	Arts specialized school
Woodbridge College	Vaughan	1958	691	Offers French Immersion

=== Elementary and intermediate schools ===
The school board currently manages 183 facilities which provides elementary education.

Aurora

- Aurora Grove PS
- Aurora Heights PS
- Aurora Senior PS (now Wellington PS)
- Devins Drive PS
- George Street PS (now Wellington PS)
- Hartman PS
- Highview PS
- Lester B. Pearson PS
- Northern Lights PS
- Regency Acres PS
- Rick Hansen PS
- Wells Street PS
- Wellington PS (Formerly Aurora Senior PS)
- Unnamed ES (Hartwell Way)

East Gwillimbury

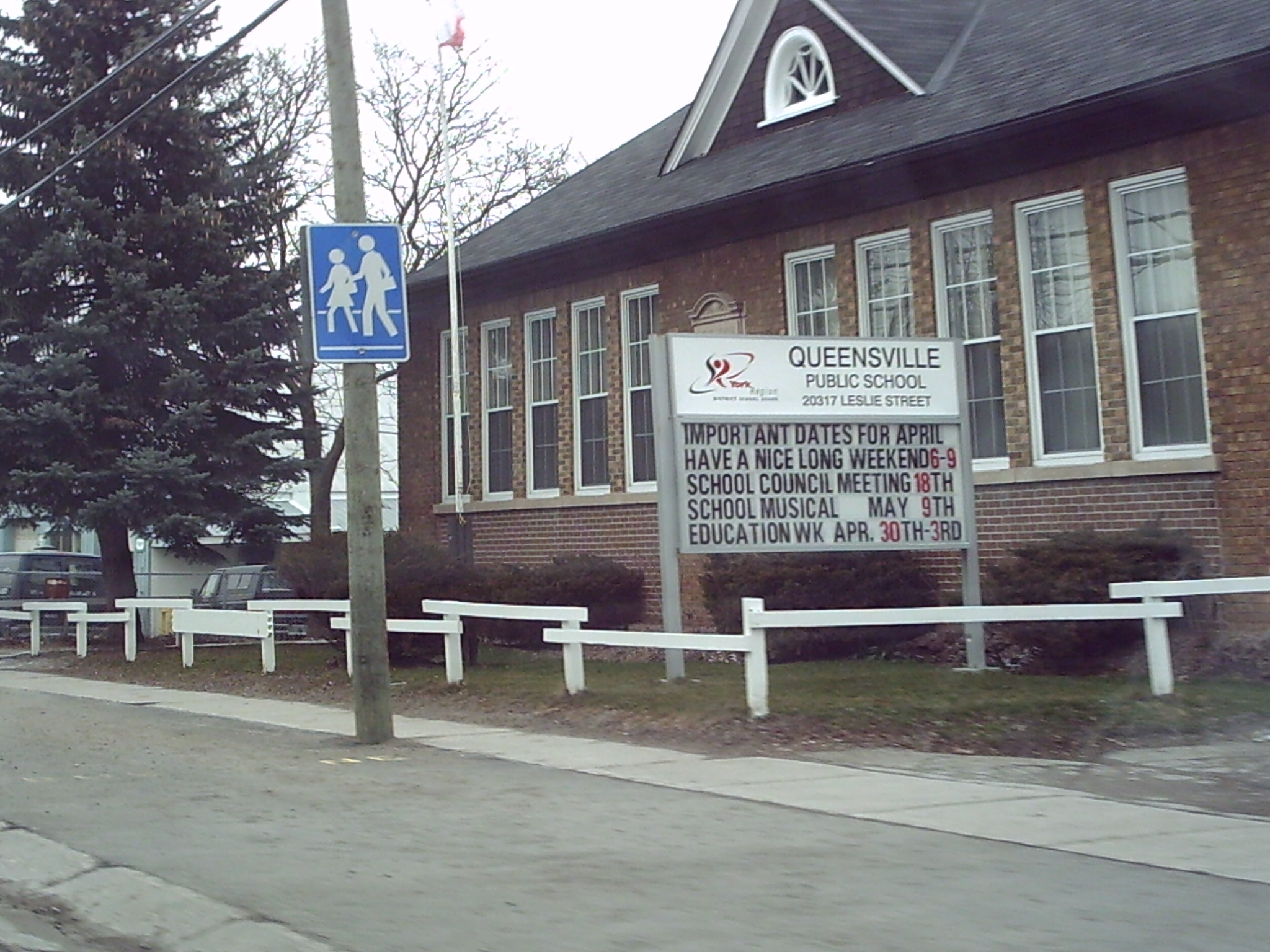
Queensville Public School

- Holland Landing PS
- Mount Albert PS
- Park Avenue PS
- Queensville PS
- Robert Munsch PS (in Mount Albert)
- Sharon Public School
- Phoebe Gilman Public School

Georgina

- Black River PS
- Deer Park PS
- Fairwood PS
- Georgina Island Building
- Jersey PS (JK–8)
- Keswick PS
- Lake Simcoe PS
- Lakeside PS
- Morning Glory PS - serves grades 6-8 students from Chippewas of Georgina Island First Nation
- R.L. Graham PS
- Sutton PS
- W.J. Watson PS

King

- Kettleby PS
- King City PS
- Nobleton Junior PS
- Nobleton Senior PS
- Schomberg PS

Markham

- Aldergrove PS
- Armadale PS
- Ashton Meadows PS
- Baythorn PS
- Bayview Fairways PS
- Bayview Glen PS
- Beckett Farm PS
- Black Walnut PS
- Boxwood PS
- Buttonville PS
- Castlemore PS
- Cedarwood PS
- Central Park PS
- Coledale PS
- Coppard Glen PS
- Cornell Village PS
- David Suzuki PS
- Donald Cousens PS
- E.J. Sand PS
- Edward T. Crowle PS
- Ellen Fairclough PS
- Franklin Street PS (originally Markham Village PS or Markham PS, c. 1886)
- German Mills PS
- Greensborough PS
- Henderson Avenue PS
- Highgate PS
- James Robinson PS
- John McCrae PS
- Johnsview Village PS
- Legacy PS
- Lincoln Alexander PS
- Little Rouge PS
- Markham Gateway PS
- Milliken Mills PS
- Mount Joy PS
- Nokiidaa PS
- Parkland PS
- Parkview PS
- Ramer Wood PS
- Randall PS
- Reesor Park PS
- Roy H. Crosby PS
- Sam Chapman PS
- Sir Wilfrid Laurier PS
- Stonebridge PS
- Stornoway Crescent PS
- Unionville Meadows PS
- Unnamed ES (Angus Glen)
- Unnamed ES (Greensborough No. 3)
- Unnamed ES (Wismer No. 4 Southwest)
- Wilclay PS
- William Armstrong PS
- William Berczy PS
- Willowbrook PS
- Wismer PS
- Woodland PS
- Victoria Square PS

Newmarket

- Alexander Muir PS
- Armitage Village PS
- Bogart PS
- Clearmeadow PS
- Crossland PS
- Denne PS
- Glen Cedar PS
- J.L.R. Bell PS
- Maple Leaf PS
- Mazo de la Roche PS
- Meadowbrook PS
- Poplar Bank PS
- Prince Charles PS
- Rogers PS
- Stonehaven ES
- Stuart Scott PS
- Terry Fox PS
- Unnamed ES (Newmarket Southeast)

Richmond Hill

- Adrienne Clarkson PS
- Bayview Hill ES
- Beverley Acres PS
- Beynon Fields PS
- Charles Howitt PS
- Crosby Heights PS
- Doncrest PS
- Frank Puskas PS
- H.G. Bernard PS
- Kettle Lakes PS
- Lake Wilcox PS
- MacLeod's Landing PS
- Michaëlle Jean PS
- Moraine Hills PS
- O.M. MacKillop PS
- Oak Ridges PS
- Pleasantville PS
- Red Maple PS
- Redstone PS
- Richmond Rose PS
- Roselawn PS
- Ross Doan PS
- Silver Pines PS
- Silver Stream PS
- Sixteenth Avenue PS
- Tom Needham PS
- Trillium Woods PS
- Unnamed ES (Oak Ridges East No. 1)
- Unnamed ES (Oak Ridges East No. 3)
- Unnamed ES (Oak Ridges West No. 2)
- Walter Scott PS
- Windham Ridge PS
- Victoria Square PS

Vaughan

- Anne frank PS
- Bakersfield PS
- Blue Willow PS
- Brownridge PS
- Carrville Mills PS
- Charlton PS
- Discovery PS
- Dr. Roberta Bondar PS
- Elder's Mills PS
- Forest Run PS
- Fossil Hill PS
- Glen Shields PS
- Glen Gould PS
- Joseph A. Gibson PS
- Julliard PS
- Kleinburg PS
- Lorna Jackson PS
- Louis-Honore Frechette PS
- Mackenzie Glen PS
- Maple Creek PS
- Michael Cranny ES
- Pierre Berton PS
- Pine Grove PS
- Roméo Dallaire PS
- Rosedale Heights PS
- Teston Village PS
- Thornhill PS
- Thornhill Woods PS
- Unnamed ES (Block 11 North)
- Unnamed ES (Block 11 South)
- Unnamed ES (Block 11 No. 3)
- Unnamed ES (Block 12 South)
- Unnamed ES (Block 18 North)
- Unnamed ES (Block 39 West)
- Unnamed ES (Block 40)
- Vellore Woods Public School
- Ventura Park PS
- Westminster PS
- Wilshire ES
- Woodbridge PS
- Yorkhill ES

Whitchurch-Stouffville

- Ballantrae PS
- Barbara Reid PS
- Glad Park PS (Accepted students from Dickson Hill PS in Markham in September 2002)
- Harry Bowes PS
- Oscar Peterson PS
- Summitview PS
- Wendat Village PS
- Whitchurch Highlands PS
- Spring Lakes PS

=== Georgina Island ===
YRDSB provides assistance to Chippewas of Georgina Island First Nation to their school Waabgon Gamig and serves the schooling needs for students in off the reserve at Morning Glory PS (grades 6-8) and Sutton District High School (grades 9-12).

== See also ==
- York Catholic District School Board (English Catholic)
- Conseil scolaire catholique MonAvenir (French Catholic)
- Conseil scolaire Viamonde (French secular)
- List of school districts in Ontario
- List of high schools in Ontario
