= Aurora Alternative High School (Indiana) =

High school in Indiana, United States

Location
- Bloomington, Indiana; United States; 39°10′15″N 86°32′26″W

Information
- Type: Alternative school
- Motto: A Positive Alternative
- Established: 1995
- Closed: 2010
- Locale: Mid-size city
- Principal: Chuck Holloway
- Grades: 9-12
- Enrollment: ~75 (As of 2nd trimester)
- Colors: Navy Blue, Forest Green and White
- Mascot: none
- Snapshot: AUR
- Website: Homepage

Aurora Alternative High School was a high school in Bloomington, Indiana, United States.

The Bloomington Graduation School replaced the Aurora Alternative School shortly after it closed. The overlap in services and population essentially amounted to the closing of Aurora and opening of the Graduation School as a rebranding of Aurora, yet with large changes and relocation to a different building.

Aurora Alternative High School was for kids who were not successful in traditional schools or just wanted a fresh start in school life. It was also a school of choice, so a student did not have to go there, and students could choose to drop out of the school if it did not suit their needs. It only accepted students at the end of every trimester (in November, February and May).

On September 7, 2009, the enrollment to the start of the 2009–10 school year was 80.
