= Newmarket High School =

Location
- 505 Pickering Crescent; Newmarket, Ontario, L3Y 8H1; Canada; 44°2′46″N 79°25′59″W

Information
- School type: Public
- Motto: Labor Omnia Vincit (Work Conquers All)
- Founded: 1843; 183 years ago
- School board: York Region District School Board
- Superintendent: Farooq Shabbar
- Area trustee: Linda Gilbert
- Principal: Susan Maharaj
- Grades: 9 through 12 (OAC)
- Enrolment: 1295 (October 2013)
- Language: English, French
- Colours: Purple and Gold
- Mascot: Phoenix and Viking, Reggie The Raider
- Team name: Raiders
- Website: www.yrdsb.ca/schools/newmarket.hs/
- Last updated: September 2021

Newmarket High School is a secondary school located in Newmarket, Ontario, Canada. It is one of four high schools in Newmarket under the jurisdiction of the York Region District School Board and currently educates approximately 1500 students from Grades 9 to 12. The school's symbols are the phoenix and the Viking and the school's colours are purple and gold.

== History ==
The school was founded in 1843 as a "grammar school", located on Raglan Street and Millard Avenue in Newmarket. As an institution, Newmarket High School is the fourth oldest high school in Ontario (oldest being Kingston Collegiate and Vocational Institute c. 1792 and Cornwall Collegiate and Vocational School c. 1806 and Jarvis Collegiate Institute c. 1807) and oldest in York Region. This original school, which could accommodate 46 students, was built at a cost of $75.

However, by the 1870s, Newmarket's growth had rendered the original school inadequate to the task of educating the town's youth. So, in 1876, at a cost of $6,000, a new building was constructed at the southeast corner of Pearson and Prospect Streets in Newmarket, where the school was located for most of its history.

On March 16, 1893, a temperamental wood-burning furnace put an end to this building and its additions when it set off a fire that burnt the school to the ground.

In 1894, a new building was built on the same site, incorporating the innovation of electricity. This building stood until March 31, 1928, when yet another fire, this one of mysterious origin, once again utterly reduced the school to ashes. The fires led to the adoption of the orange Phoenix bird as the school's official symbol.

The same year, yet another new school was built on the Pearson Street site by George Roper Gouinlock (son of George Wallace Gouinlock), this one hailed as “one of the most modernized educational institutions in the Dominion of Canada.” This building stood for decades and underwent many additions and renovations over the years, most notably a major addition consisting of a classroom block and an additional gymnasium in the late 1950s, and a new school library in the 1960s.

Despite the additions, however, the 1960s saw an increasingly intolerable situation developing at Newmarket District High School, as it was then known. The school was overcrowded to the extent that not only did students have to share lockers, but the school day was also run in two shifts to accommodate everyone. The situation was addressed in 1962, when Huron Heights Secondary School was opened, providing Newmarket with a second high school.

By the 1990s, however, it had become clear that the existing building could no longer cope with local population growth and its facilities were becoming increasingly outdated. Plans were made to move the school to yet another site. This move (to the school's current location) was completed in October 1996, with the previous building briefly housing Newmarket Public School before being torn down in 2000; the site is now occupied by a residential neighbourhood with a parkette.

A significant portion of NHS's graduating classes goes on to pursue post-secondary education at universities across Canada (mostly in Ontario). The most popular destinations include McMaster University, University of Ottawa, Wilfrid Laurier University, Carleton University, University of Western Ontario, and Brock University, University of Waterloo, University of Toronto, and Queen's University.

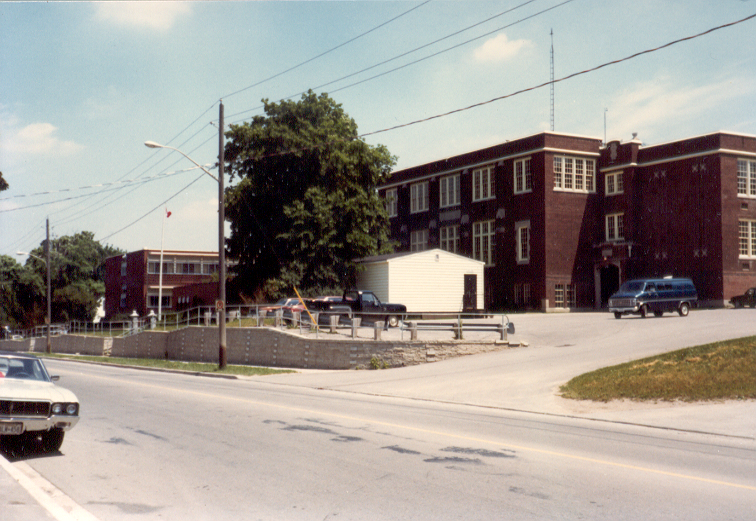
The "fourth incarnation" as it appeared in June 1981

The Current Incarnation of the School

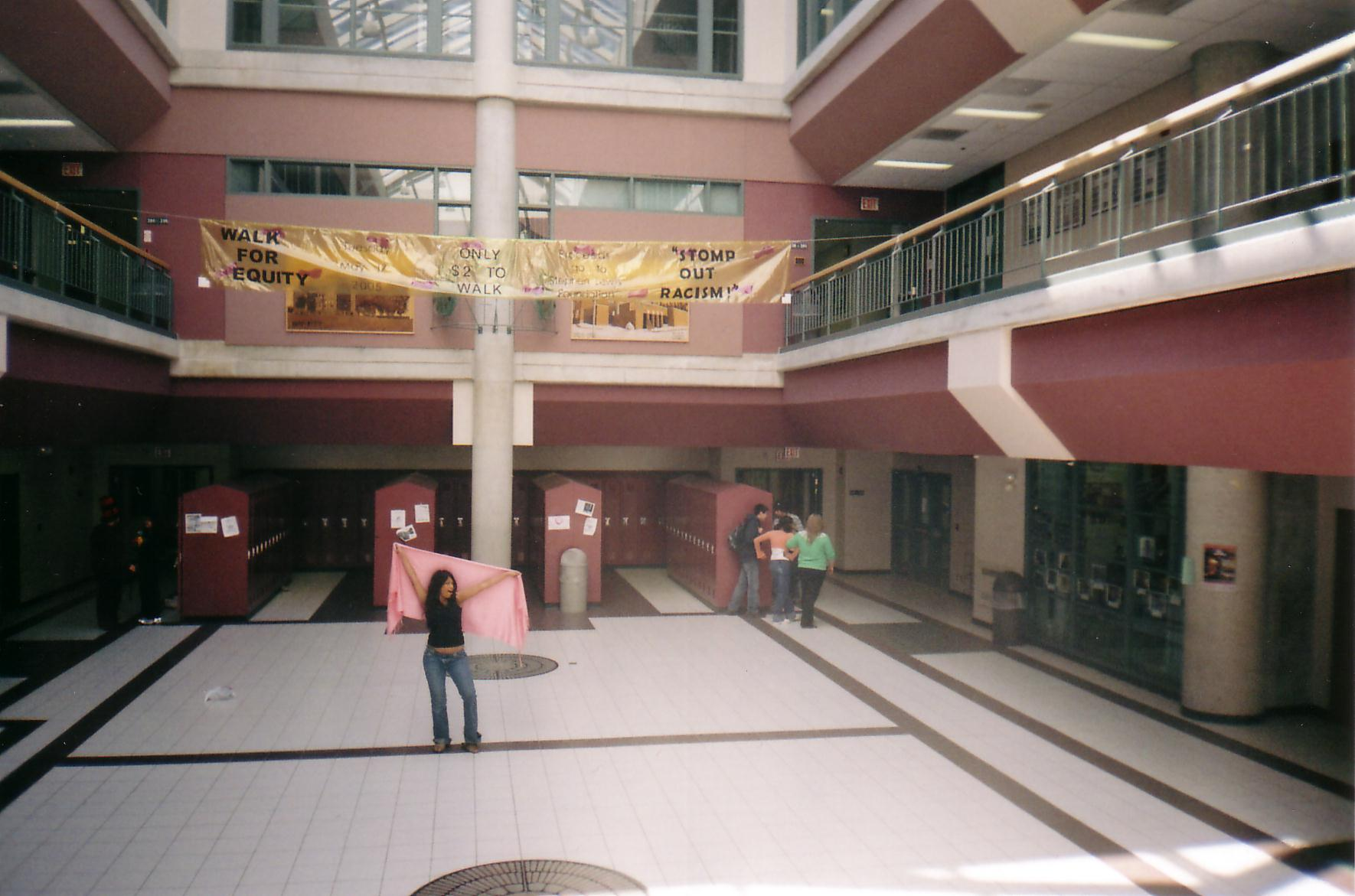
The atrium of the current N.H.S. Student groups often make banners that are attached to the railings of either hallways, as shown in the image.

Current academic programs offered at Newmarket High School include a gifted/enriched program, a French immersion program, and Specialist High Skills Majors (SHSM) program.

== Notable alumni ==
- Emma Sophia Baker, early 20th century psychologist
- Munro Chambers, actor from "The Latest Buzz" and "Degrassi: The Next Generation"
- B.J. Crombeen, former professional ice hockey winger who played in the National Hockey League
- Travis Dermott, ice hockey defenceman for the Utah Hockey Club
- Brian Elliott, free agent professional ice hockey goaltender
- Michelle Long, figure skater
- Hugo Lopez, free agent defensive back
- Robin Mackin, Canadian Olympic softball player, former pitcher for Canada National Softball team, won silver at 2007 Pan American Games
- Jamie Macoun, former two-time Stanley Cup Winner with The Calgary Flames and The Detroit Red Wings, also played with The Toronto Maple Leafs
- Steven Lee Olsen, country music artist
- Pete Orr, former Canadian Olympic baseball player and second-baseman
- The Salads, punk rock band
- Lindsay Seemann, Canadian Olympic Swimmer
- Belinda Stronach, Canadian politician, businesswoman, business magnate, and former MP for the riding of Newmarket-Aurora from 2004 to 2008
- Tokyo Police Club, indie rock band

== See also ==
- Education in Ontario
- List of secondary schools in Ontario
- York Region District School Board
- Newmarket, Ontario

== Sources ==
- Newmarket High School's History
