= Dr. G.W. Williams Secondary School =

Dr. G.W. Williams Secondary School (Dunning Ave)

Location
- 11 Spring Farm Road; Aurora, Ontario, L4G 7W2; Canada; 44°00′53″N 79°26′41″W

Information
- School type: Public
- Motto: Mens sana in corpore sano (A sound mind in a sound body)
- Founded: 1888 (as Aurora High School)
- School board: York Region District School Board
- Superintendent: Deborah Joyce
- Area trustee: Melanie Wright
- Principal: Andrew Gazaneo
- Grades: 9-12
- Enrolment: 1354 (October 2021)
- Language: English
- Colour: Double blue
- Mascot: Wildcat
- Team name: Williams Wildcats
- Website: www.yrdsb.ca/schools/drgwwilliams.ss/
- Last updated: September 2025

Dr. G.W. Williams Secondary School is one of five high schools in Aurora, Ontario and is one of two under the jurisdiction of the York Region District School Board. In 2005, there were approximately 1350 students from Grades 9 to 12. In the 2017–2018 school year, enrolment was approximately 750 students.

== History ==
The school started in 1888 as Aurora High School on the top floor of the Aurora Public School located at 22 Church Street. In 1892 they moved into a new purpose built building on Wells Street that would later become the Wells Street Public School after the High School moved to Dunning Avenue in 1952. Additions were placed on the Dunning Avenue school in 1956, 1967, and 1998. In 1961 the school was renamed The Dr. G. W. Williams Secondary School in honour of Dr. David Garnet Wolsley Williams, a local medical doctor and former trustee of the school board. Dr. G.W. Williams is one of the YRDSB's International Baccalaureate schools.

== Replacement school ==
In 2018, the Ontario Ministry of Education approved funding to replace the current Dr. G.W. Williams school building, and to build the replacement on a site approximately 3 km (1.9 mi) northeast of the current school's location, along Bayview Avenue. The new school opened in September 2025.

== Notable alumni ==
- Brian Stemmle - Canadian Alpine Ski Team
- Garth Gibson - Proposed the redundant array of independent disks (RAID) concept along with David Patterson and Randy Katz
- Matthew Ko - First Mr. Hong Kong winner in 2005 and TVB male artist.
- Lois Brown - Former MP of Newmarket—Aurora

== See also ==
- Education in Ontario
- List of secondary schools in Ontario
