= Unionville High School (Ontario) =

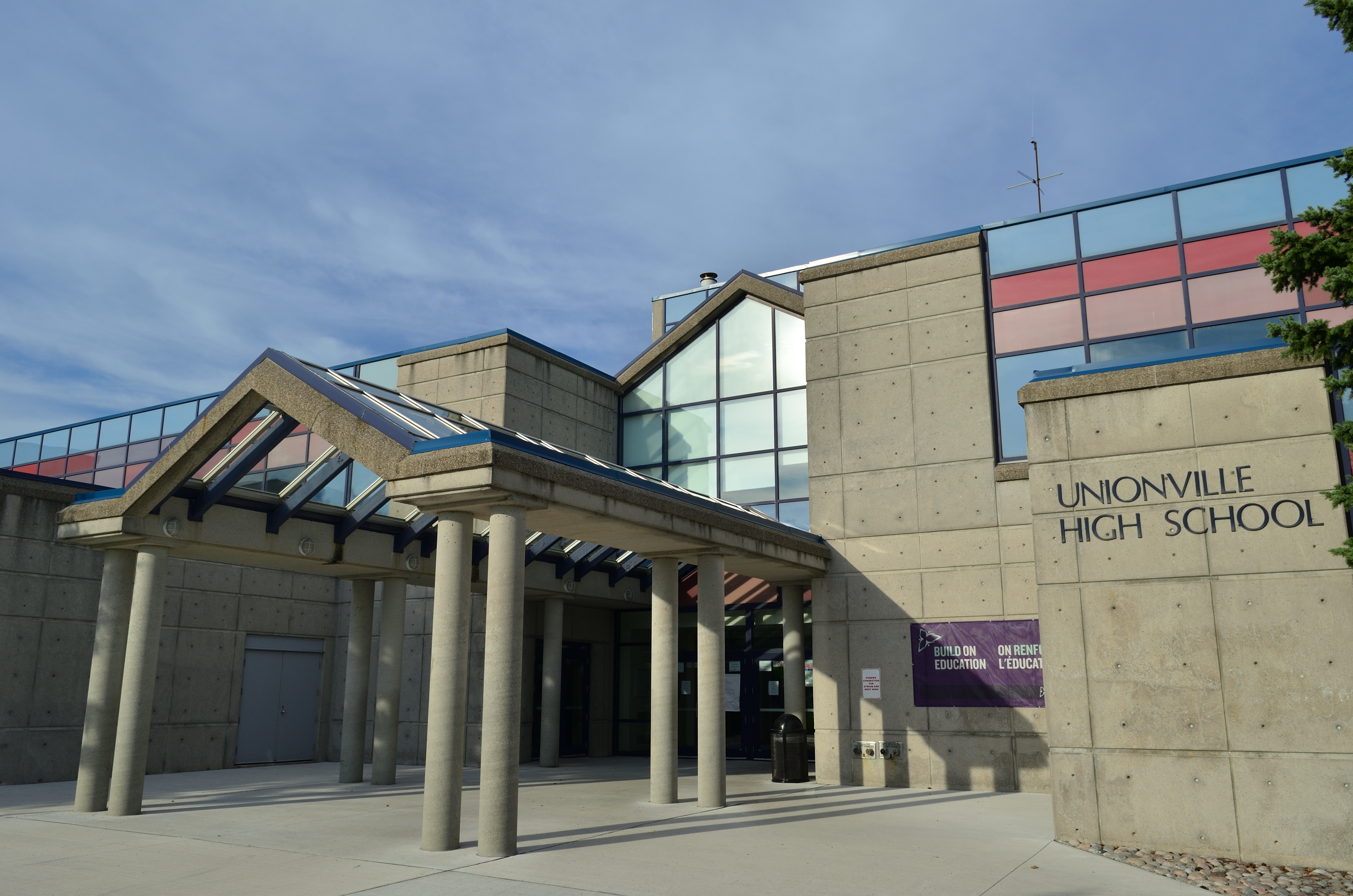
- Entrance

Location
- 201 Town Centre Boulevard; Markham, Ontario, L3R 8G5; Canada; 43°52′N 79°20′W

Information
- School type: Public Secondary School
- Motto: Create and Achieve
- Founded: 1985
- School board: York Region District School Board
- Superintendent: TBD
- Area trustee: Billy Pang
- Principal: Susie Nunes
- Vice-Principals: Patrick Belmonte; Catherine Clarke; Raymond Luong
- Grades: 9-12
- Enrolment: 1649 (October 2015)
- Language: English; French
- Hours in school day: 6
- Area: York Region
- Colours: Maroon and Grey
- Mascot: Sam the Wolf
- Team name: Unionville Wolves
- Website: yrdsb.ca
- Last updated: April 2022

Unionville High School is a public high school of the York Region District School Board in Ontario, Canada. It is located in the Unionville district in the city of Markham. The school is located next to the Markham Civic Centre and the Markham Theatre.

Unionville High School is most well known for its enriched arts program, Arts Unionville (formerly known as Arts York). The school was purpose-built to house this regional arts program, therefore it has enhanced arts facilities. Arts Unionville is divided into 4 categories: visual arts, music, dance, and drama. To determine if they will be a good fit for the program, grade eight to nine students are required to audition and participate in a wide-ranging conversation to determine. It is possible to enter the program in the upper grades, as well, if there is room.

== History ==
In the mid-1970s, Superintendent Stephen Bacsalmsi proposed the idea of an advanced arts program for the region. The Ontario government accepted the idea, but needed to wait for a new high school to be built. When Unionville High School was under construction, the government decided it was a prime opportunity to initiate the program. The school was finished and opened to the public in 1985, with the schools west wing constructed in the Spring of 2002.

Unionville High School also became the first school outside the United States to participate in the Apple Digital Campus Curriculum (ADCC) in 2002.

In 2005, Sheila Hetherington and Jerry Berridge, teachers in the history and tech departments, were recipients of the Governor General's Awards for Excellence in Teaching Canadian History. In 2006, the same two teachers later received the Prime Minister's Awards for Teaching Excellence. For the 2007-08 teaching year, Donna McAdam was a recipient of the Premier's Awards for Teaching Excellence. The two documentaries created during this course, When We Were Young and Never Shall We Forget, were of broadcast standard and aired on TVO.

== Facilities ==
The facilities at Unionville High include a visual arts room, communication/media lab, construction lab, design and technology lab, dance studios, music rooms, music practice rooms, drama rooms, a black box theatre, family studies labs, a photography blackroom, science labs, a resource centre, classrooms, a guidance office, two gymnasiums, two outdoor fields, an outdoor track, a weight room, washrooms and shower facilities, student cafeteria with microwaves and vending machines, a student council office, a yearbook office, student parking facilities, a staff dining room, and staff workrooms.

There are approximately 300 computers in the school, divided between 9 computer labs. Notably, two of the computer labs employ Apple computers, as a part of the Apple Digital Campus.

While officially being two separate properties, the school as well as the Markham Theatre are connected via a tunnel. The theatre occasionally hosts school assemblies as well as interdisciplinary performances from the Arts Unionville program, most notably the annual Showtime music theatre production and the collaborative Alchemy performance.

== Programs ==
=== Arts Unionville program ===
Arts Unionville, formally known as Arts York, is a four-year program that high school students take concurrently with the mainstream academic program. The high school enrols students from all over the Greater Toronto Area. In 2010, due to school board changes, Arts York was forced to change their program name to Arts Unionville and will only take students from the Markham area, except for piano and stringed instruments. Class 2012 was the last year of Arts York. However, in the 2009–10 school year, the program was renamed "Arts Unionville" Shortly after, the York Region District School Board removed funding for busing, thus eliminating transportation means for long-distance students attending the program. As a result, students were forced to drop out. The decision was protested by many parents and students, and after hiring a lawyer, they settled out of court to have funding for bus transportation reinstated for the rest of the 2008–2009 school year. Students living in areas not around Unionville were expected to attend arts schools in their own districts. As a result, the pool of talent for these programs has declined.

==== Musical arts ====
The Musical Arts department is the biggest section of Arts Unionville at Unionville High School. There are four classrooms for music situated in the east wing of the school directly adjacent to the underground link to the Markham Theatre. With its strategic placement, it is often said amongst faculty, staff, and students that the Music department is located in its own east wing.

The Arts Unionville Music program is separated into six categories: piano, winds, strings, vocal, brass, and percussion.

==== Visual arts ====
The Visual Arts program provides opportunities for individual creative and imaginative growth as well as development of technical skills. In this program, students are introduced to both traditional and experimental perspectives in painting and drawing. They will also be specializing in sculpture, photography, digital, printmaking (etching and silkscreen), and video. Students will also study art history and will learn to critically analyze their own work, enabling the students to discover individual strengths and directions. For the purpose of developing the aptitudes of talented students interested in the Visual Arts, programs are offered in all four years.

==== Dramatic arts ====
The Drama Department explores university level dramatic arts. Disciplines such as mask, mime, clown and Shakespeare are presented to the actors and explored through self-discovery.

==== Dance arts ====
Dance arts is another popular program in Arts Unionville. This program focuses on the development of creativity, artistry, and technique needed to improve dance expression. Students in this program are given opportunities to participate in dance programs such as Dance Infusion, Dance Access, and The Nutcracker productions in December staged by the National Ballet of Canada.

== Academic achievement ==
Students at Unionville High School has in recent years performed very well in academics, whether it be in compulsory provincial testing, or in extra-curricular academic competitions. Academically, the Fraser institute 2014 Report Card gave the high school a rating of 9.5/10 and a rank of second out of 740 schools in Ontario, and sixth out of 690 schools in Ontario over the past five years. When the Fraser Institute originally began publishing report on Ontario secondary schools in 2001, Unionville was rated at 8.9/10 and ranked at 36 out of 568 schools and 21 out of 349 in Ontario.

=== Provincial assessment ===
Each year, Grade 9 students across Ontario are issued province-wide standardized tests in Mathematics. The tests themselves are administered by the Ontario Education Quality and Accountability Office (EQAO). The Mathematics assessment is graded under the Ontario rubric, where level 3 is considered the provincial standard, and level 4 is considered above the provincial standard. In the 2012–13 academic year:

- 34% of Unionville students, enrolled in the academic program, scored level 4 in EQAO Math Assessment (only 13% of all students in Ontario achieved this standard).
- 97% of Unionville students, enrolled in the academic program, scored level 3 or above in EQAO Math Assessment (only 84% of Ontario students achieved this standard).

In addition to the Grade 9 mathematics assessment, EQAO also administers the Ontario Secondary School Literacy Test, a standardized test for high school students in Ontario who wish to graduate from an Ontario secondary school and obtain their Ontario Secondary School Diploma. The test is written every year on the last Thursday of March in all public secondary schools including Unionville. In the 2009 testing:

- 96% of Unionville students who were taking the test for the first time passed the Ontario Secondary School Literacy Test, (compared to an 82% success rate for the province as a whole).

=== Extra-curricular competitions ===
The school itself has also formed extra-curricular clubs or teams to compete in academic competitions such as the national Reach for the Top trivia game show and the Distributive Education Clubs of America (DECA). Several students representing the school have been sent to represent the province in international DECA competitions, and in some cases, achieving stellar results during the competition. Students also have the opportunity to compete in the Canadian Open Mathematics Challenge (COMC) each year as individuals and as a part of the school team each year.

== Clubs and extracurricular activities ==
=== Sports ===
Unionville High School is a member of the York Region Athletic Association and OFSAA.

A notable member of the Unionville High School hockey team was Cody Hodgson, who played for the Vancouver Canucks and the Buffalo Sabres in the NHL. An autographed jersey can be found in the school.

=== YRDSB International Languages Program ===
The YRDSB International Languages Program holds Cantonese, Greek, Japanese, and Mandarin classes for Senior Kindergarten to Grade 8 on various days of the week at Unionville High School.

== Notable alumni ==
- Marc Bendavid, actor
- Lani Billard, actress
- Steve Byers, actor
- James Cade, actor
- Christina Cox, actress
- Emmanuelle Chriqui, actress
- Hayden Christensen, actor
- Chad Donella, actor
- Ely Henry, actor
- Justin Hines, singer-songwriter
- Cody Hodgson, ice hockey player
- Alexandre Lyssov, Canadian épée fencer
- Matthew Knight, actor
- Aviva Mongillo, actress
- Connor Price, actor
- Emanuel Sandhu, figure skater and dancer
- Nathan Stephenson, actor
- Tanya Talaga, journalist and author
- Iman Vellani, actress
- Sarah Wells, hurdler
- Shivon Zilis, venture capitalist and engineer
- Stephen Keeho Yoon, k-pop artist

== See also ==
- Education in Ontario
- List of secondary schools in Ontario
