= Ryan Blanchet =

Canadian touring car racer

- Born: June 12, 1990 (age 36) Ajax, Ontario, Canada

Castrol Canadian Touring Car Championship (Touring) career
- Debut season: 2009
- Current team: Blanchet Motorsports
- Years active: 1997-present
- Car number: 84
- Starts: 30
- Best finish: 8th in 2010 and 2011

Previous series
- 2001-2004 2006 2007: Sunoco Ron Fellows Karting Championship; Brian Stewart Racing Karting Championship; Ontario GT Sprints Championship

Awards
- 2008 2008 2009: Bob Attrell Award - BARC's Best New Driver; BARC Rookie of the Year Award; CTCC Touring Rookie of the Year Award

Ryan Blanchet (born June 12, 1990 in Ajax, Ontario, Canada) is a Canadian touring car racer who competes in Canada's only professional Touring Car Championship, the Castrol Canadian Touring Car Championship. He also goes by his nickname "BL".

== Racing career ==
=== Karting Years ===
Growing up in a family who loved racing, along with an uncle who raced in the Esso Protec Formula Ford 1600 Championship, it was only a matter of time before Ryan would get behind the wheel. Ryan started racing go-karts in 1997 at the age of 6, at Mosport International Raceway Development track with Mosport Kart Club in Bowmanville, Ontario, Canada; he won 1 race and finished 3rd in the Novice Championship.

Starting in the 1998 season Ryan raced at the Simcoe Kart Club in Sutton, Ontario, Canada till 2003. While racing at Simcoe Ryan dominated the Novice/Cadet class with 23 wins in 36 races in a 3-year period. In 2004 Ryan started racing with the Toronto Kart Club at Goodwood Kartways just outside his hometown of Uxbridge, Ontario, Canada. Ryan's karting career came to an end in 2006 at the age of 16 with 10 full seasons of club racing and 4 full seasons of provincial championships.

=== 2007 ===
During 2007 Ryan became his brother, Greg's driver coach. Greg started racing in 1999. 2007 was Greg's most successful season as he competed in the Senior Rotax class. Greg sat on his first pole that year at the Hersey Centre Grand Prix. That would be Greg's last season racing. has he was losing interest growing up.

=== 2008 ===
2008 saw the return of Ryan to the track. He would race a Nissan Sentra in the GT-D class in the Ontario Sprints Championship. Ryan finished 3rd in the championship just 10 points out of 1st, with a best finish of 2nd at Mosport in the rain.

Ryan also won the Bob Attrell Best New Driver Award, Barc Rookie of the Year Award, and finished 2nd in the Toyo Tires Championship.

=== Canadian Touring Car Championship ===
In 2009, Blanchet joined his father in the Castrol Canadian Touring Car Championship. Ryan raced very clean all season and had an average finishing place of 9th in the 2009 season, with a best finish 8th at the last race at Circuit ICAR. Ryan finished 7th in the championship in his rookie year which led to the CTCC Touring Rookie of the Year Award.

In 2010, Ryan started the season weak finishing outside the top 10 in the first three races. After the race the first few races, Ryan began to pick up momentum, finishing 7th in Toronto. At the last race at Circuit ICAR, Ryan started at the back on Sunday and rose through the field to finish 5th, becoming his best finish in Touring. Ryan finished 8th in points, in the 2010 season. In the 2011 season Blanchet again finished eighth in points.
