= Stouffville GO Station =

Railway station in Stouffville, Ontario, Canada

Stouffville
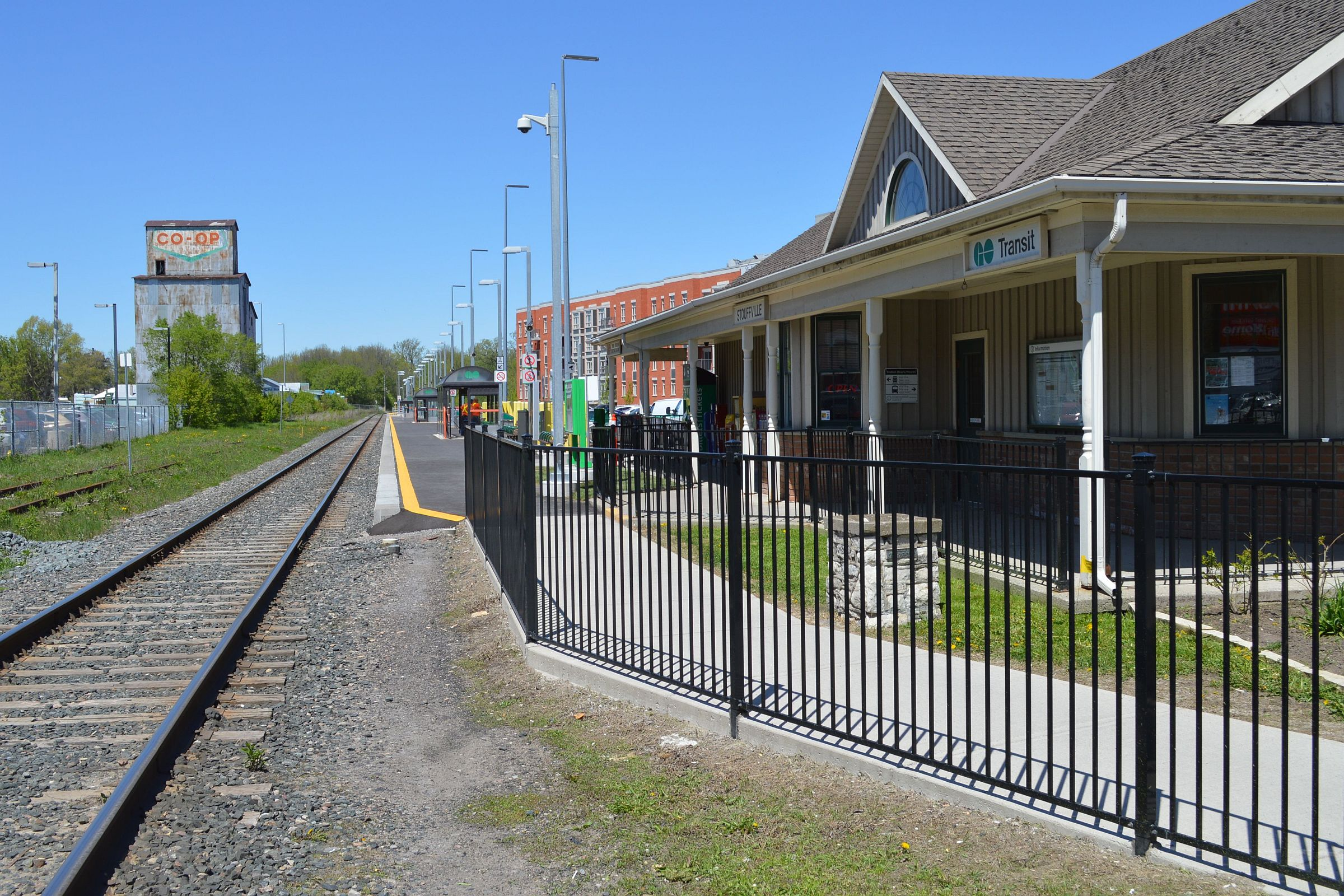
- Stouffville GO Station in 2013

General information
- Location: 6176 Main Street West; Stouffville, Ontario; Canada
- Coordinates: 43°58′15″N 79°15′00″W
- Owner: Metrolinx
- Platforms: Side platform
- Tracks: 1
- Bus routes: 70 71
- Connections: York Region Transit

Construction
- Structure type: Historic station building
- Parking: 243 spaces
- Cycle facilities: Yes
- Accessible: Yes

Other information
- Station code: GO Transit: ST
- Fare zone: 74

History
- Opened: 1869 (T&NR); September 7, 1982 (GO Transit)

Passengers
- 2018: 110,000

Services
Preceding station	GO Transit	Following station
Mount Joy towards Union	Stouffville	Old Elm Terminus
Former services
Preceding station	York–Durham Heritage Railway	Following station
Terminus	Stouffville–Uxbridge	Uxbridge Terminus
Preceding station	Canadian National Railway	Following station
Markham toward Toronto	Toronto – Belleville via Peterboro	Goodwood toward Belleville
Markham toward Toronto	Toronto – Port Hope via Peterboro	Goodwood toward Port Hope
Location

Stouffville GO Station is a railway station in the GO Transit network located in Stouffville, Ontario, Canada. It was the northern terminus of the Stouffville line train service until the line was extended to Lincolnville (now Old Elm) on September 2, 2008. Buses serve the station from stops on the street due to space limitations.

The now defunct York–Durham Heritage Railway at one time ran historical trains between the station and Uxbridge on summer weekends.

== History ==
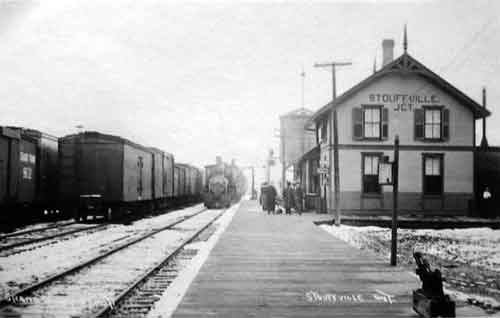
Stouffville station was a two-storey building as befitting its status as a junction

The Toronto and Nipissing Railway was completed in 1871, connecting Stouffville and Uxbridge with Toronto. The line's northeastern terminus at Coboconk, Ontario, on Balsam Lake in the Kawarthas was completed in 1872. In 1877, a second track was built from Stouffville north to Jackson's Point on Lake Simcoe. These connections were created in large part to provide a reliable and efficient means of transporting timber harvested and milled in these regions. Soon Stouffville Junction serviced thirty trains per day. The railway became the Grand Trunk Railway in 1884, and Canadian National Railways took over the line in 1914.

The original station, a converted Victorian home with annex, was demolished in the 1980s and not replaced until the current station was built for GO Transit in the 1990s. The water tower had been removed earlier but discussions continued about the fate of the 1916 Stouffville Co-op grain elevator, which needs to be relocated for GO Transit expansion. In May 2015, the grain elevator was demolished and replaced with 20 parking spaces after Metrolinx determined it was a fire hazard due to its deteriorated condition. Local preservationists were upset over the bulldozing of the 100-year-old structure.

In July 2005, the station site was expanded to include more parking in the west lot. An additional 60 surface parking spaces was added to the station in June 2016.

== Connecting transit ==
=== York Region Transit ===
- Route 9 Eastbound to 14th Avenue and Westbound to Stouffville Walmart

== See also ==
- Nineteen on the Park (c 1896)
