= Lake Simcoe Junction Railway =

Overview
- Headquarters: Toronto, Ontario
- Locale: Ontario, Canada
- Dates of operation: 1877–1981

Technical
- Track gauge: 4 ft 8 1/2 in (1,435 mm) standard gauge from 1881
- Previous gauge: 3 ft 6 in (1,067 mm) narrow gauge before 1881

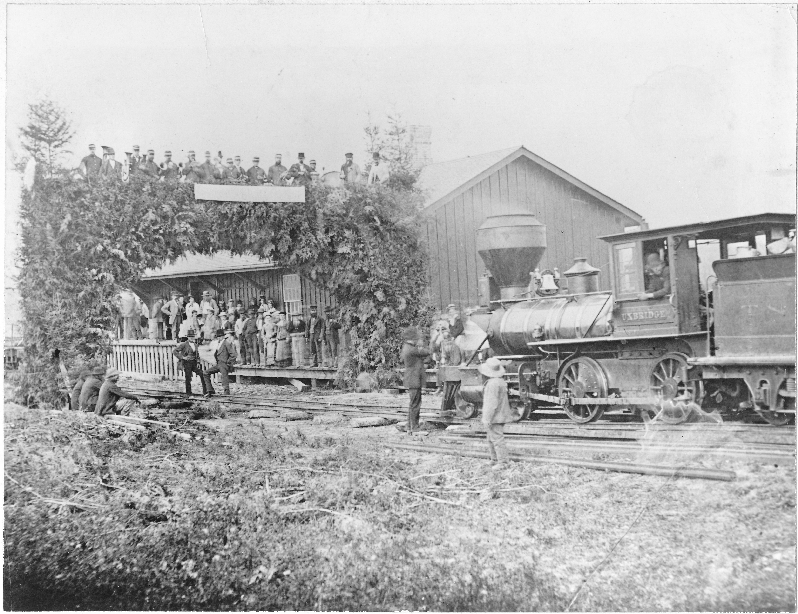
The first train arrives in Sutton in 1877.

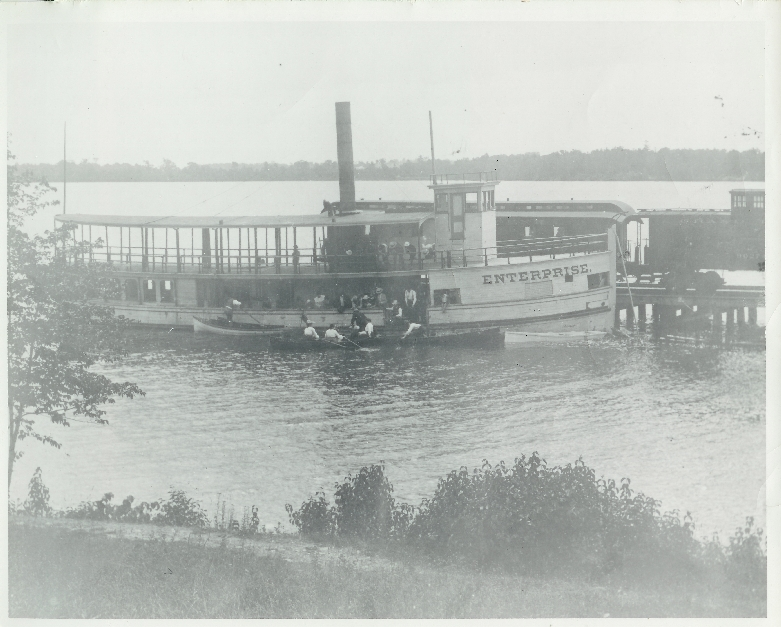
Steamer Enterprise loads cargo onto a Grand Trunk train on the wharf at Jackson's Point.

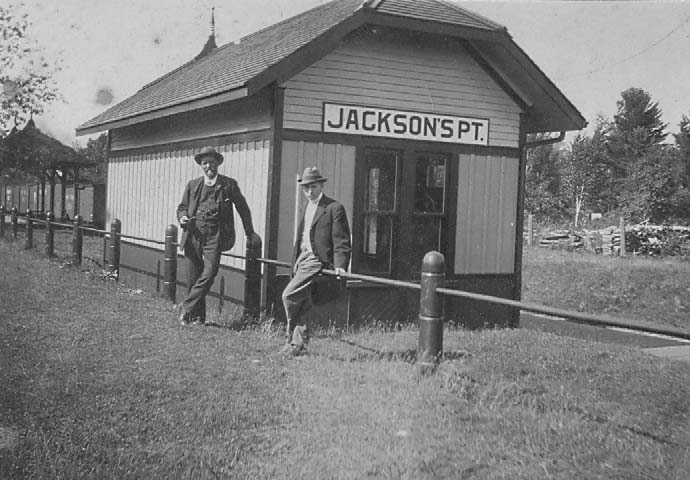
The passenger station at Jackson's Point was a simple affair.

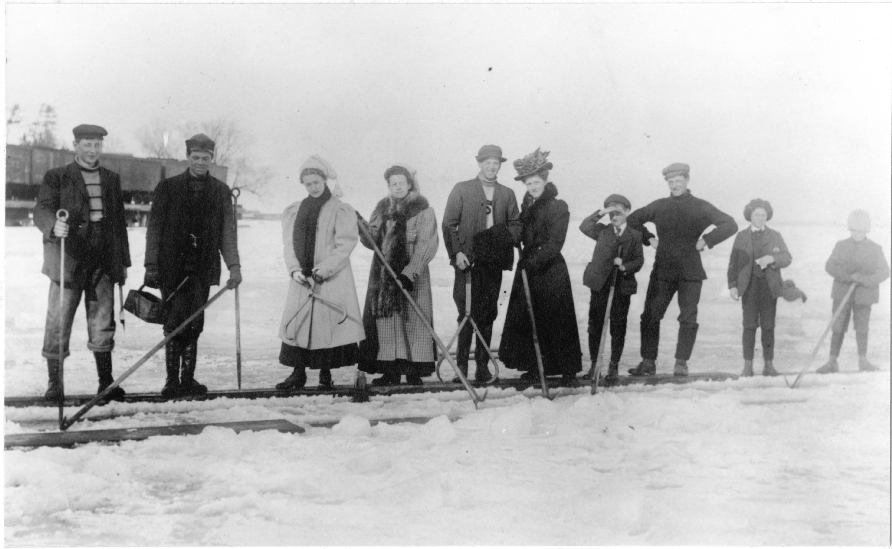
Workers and their families pose for a photo while ice cutting at Jackson's Point in 1895. A Grand Trunk train waits in the background.

The Lake Simcoe Junction Railway (LSJR) was a short-line narrow gauge railway in Ontario just north of Toronto. It branched off the Toronto and Nipissing Railway at Stouffville and ran 42 kilometres (26 miles) north to the town of Sutton and then continued on to the shore of Lake Simcoe where a large wharf was built. The presence of the railway helped the town of Jackson's Point form on the lakeside. The line serviced timber and agricultural shipping, but was more widely used for shipping ice cut from the lake in the winter, and allowing weekend day trips to the lake in the summer.

The arrival of the Toronto and York Radial Railway at Sutton in 1908 took most of the summertime passenger business away, and the introduction of refrigeration did the same for the wintertime ice business. Service ended to the Point in September 1927 and the rails were lifted. Service below Sutton continued through a connection to the standard gauge Canadian Northern Railway (CNoR), 4 km (2 1/2 mi) west of the town of Zephyr. It saw some use during the construction of Maple Leaf Gardens three years later, when a spur line was built to a gravel pit a short distance south of Sutton. The entire line closed in 1979 and the rails were lifted in 1981.

A portion of the original route was converted, circa 2000, into the Sutton-Zephyr Rail Trail.

== History ==
=== Planning ===
The late 1800s saw widespread development of railways in southern Ontario as various markets were opened both by the Grand Trunk Railway along Lake Ontario as well as the Trent Canal along the lakes some 150 kilometres (95 mi) north of Toronto. A variety of lines linking points on between the two sprung up, looking to cut the route to Toronto as short as possible. None of the lines ran directly to Lake Simcoe, some 65 kilometres (40 mi) directly north, and the closest approach so far was made by the Port Whitby and Port Perry Railway, only 60 kilometres (35 mi) from Toronto but further along the Canal and a much longer route overall.

Plans to reach Lake Simcoe were greatly aided by the construction of the Toronto and Nipissing Railway (T&N) that was aiming ultimately to run around the eastern side of the lake towards the interprovincial lines outside of North Bay, far to the north. The T&N reached Stouffville in 1871 and pushed on a few more miles to Uxbridge by the end of the year. In the early 1870s, businessmen in the Sutton area, about 85 kilometres (55 mi) north of Toronto, began talks with the T&N about a branch line. The Lake Simcoe Junction Railway was chartered on 29 March 1873, with plans to branch off the T&N on the north side of Stouffville and run north for Sutton while the original T&N continued north-east.

The T&N was built by Francis Shanly, a strong supporter of 3 ft 6 in (1,067 mm) gauge railways. Most Ontario railways of that era were built at Provincial gauge, 5 ft 6 in (1,676 mm), because such lines were backed by provincial grants. However, the narrow gauge was far less expensive to build and Shanly had been using it on a growing network of lines in the Toronto area. He agreed to design and build the LSJR for $290,000 (equivalent to $9,500,000 in 2025), and an initial agreement with T&N was signed on 1 December 1874 to provide rolling stock and operate the line for 25 years in exchange for 25% of the receipts, although this was not finally ratified until 19 October 1876. The LSJR would later receive $2,000 per mile from the provincial government in spite of using narrow gauge, about one-fifth of the total construction costs.

=== Construction and early operations ===
Shanly surveyed the line in 1875, but construction was delayed by the lack of a final agreement with the T&N. Construction began in early 1877 with grading all the way to Sutton, and the first rail was laid at Stouffville on 18 June 1877. The line was built from 40-pound rail imported from England. The bush cut for the line was stacked and burned, heating nearby rails to the point that the crews would roast crows on them for food. The line was completed and opened for business on 1 October 1877.

The line was mostly served by whistle stops consisting of lean-tos with green flags that would be displayed to call for a stop. A large wharf was built on the lakeshore in 1879, giving rise to the village of Jackson's Point. The main services for the LSJR were summertime passengers visiting the beaches to the west, and a major wintertime service shipping cut ice to Toronto. Early service was often disrupted by livestock wandering onto the lines, and upset farmers would retaliate by spreading lard on the rails on uphill sections.

By the 1880s there were a large number of lines east of Toronto competing for the same trade. Most of the lines were unprofitable, and the widespread adoption of standard gauge at 4 ft 8 1/2 in (1,435 mm) required expenses the T&N could not afford. The T&N sold itself, along with the LSJR, to the Midland Railway of Canada in 1881, who agreed to re-gauge the lines as part of the purchase.

=== Competition, realignment ===
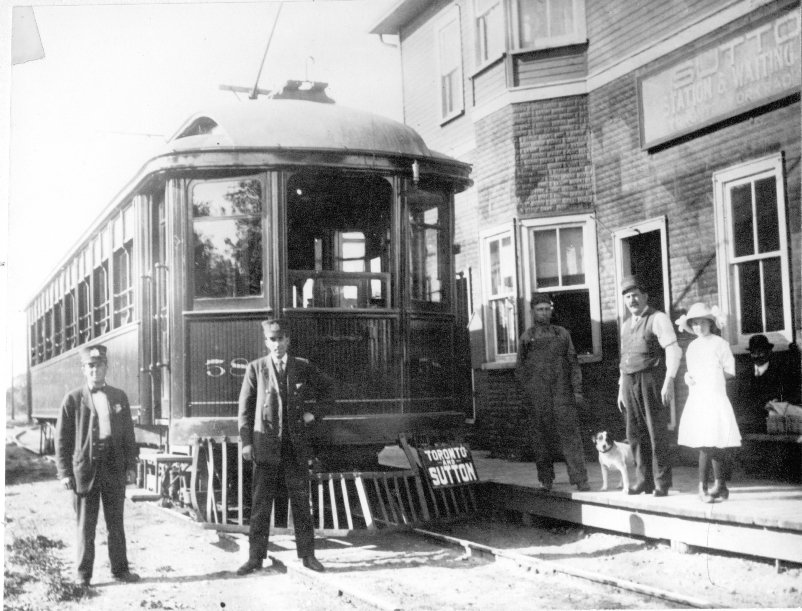
The LSJR could not compete with the high-speed service provided by the Radial Railway's electric cars.

The Toronto and York Radial Railway (Metropolitan line) ran a radial tram service along Yonge Street from Toronto reaching Sutton in 1906. This provided service to Toronto in about 2 1/2 hours, far faster than the T&N, causing the LSJR's passenger service to disappear overnight. The arrival of the Canadian Northern Railway (CNoR) at Pefferlaw only a short distance to the east the same year did the same to much of the secondary agricultural shipping business. The introduction of home refrigeration eliminated the ice shipping business over time. Local service continued, but the wharf on the lake was abandoned on 24 September 1927, and the lines between there and Sutton were lifted in 1929. Mixed passenger/freight service ended on 19 May 1928. (Note: None of the sources state what service was left after the ending of mixed trains. It appears this means passenger service ended and freight remained, but they do not state this explicitly. It may be that separate freight and passenger services were offered, but this appears unlikely.)

The new CNoR line ran across the LSJR almost exactly at its midpoint, where the two lines paralleled each other for some distance near the town of Mount Albert. In 1928 the LSJR was connected to the CNoR about 3 miles (5 km) west of the town of Zephyr, just north of Mount Albert. A short connection running east off the original LSJR alignment connected to the CNoR in a large wye known as Zephyr Junction. Toronto access was now provided by the CNoR line. The section south from Zephyr Junction to Ballantrae was lifted between the 12th and 25 October 1928, the rest of the original alignment from Ballantrae to Stouffville operated as a spur until it was lifted in 1930.

A spur off the remaining northern section of the line was opened to a gravel yard near Sutton, which saw significant use during the construction of Maple Leaf Gardens, starting in 1931.

=== Abandonment ===
On 1 January 1884, the entire Midland was leased to the Grand Trunk Railway. They operated the LSJR with Grand Trunk rolling stock. Their bankruptcy in 1919 and following nationalization into the Canadian National Railway (CN) crown corporation in 1923 began a process that led to the CNoR's line becoming the north-south CN mainline. The mainline was reorganized and renamed several times before eventually becoming the Bala Subdivision, while the LSJR was known as the Sutton Subdivision throughout. The LSJR was downgraded from a Subdivision to a Spur with the 30 October 1960 CN timetable updates.

With the ending of tight regulation of the railways, many smaller lines were abandoned. This included the 13 August 1979 abandonment of the remaining 14 kilometres (10 mi) of the LSJR. The rails were lifted starting on 14 July 1981. The later abandonment of this section left it in a state of good repair for conversion to rail trail use. This is now known as the Sutton-Zephyr Rail Trail, ending just off the T&N lines at Zephyr Junction.

== Route ==
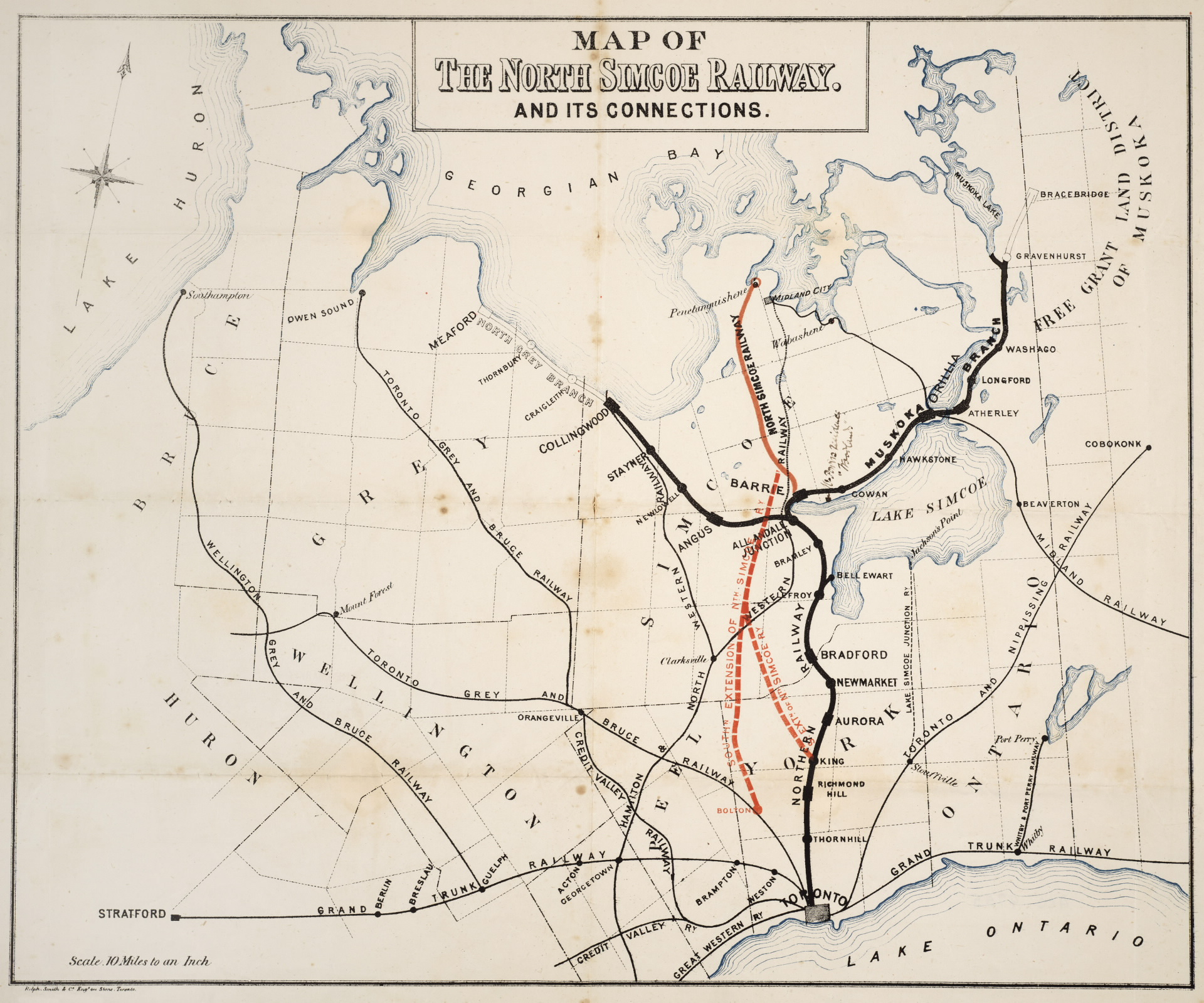
The LSJR can be seen, dashed right of center, on this map of the North Simcoe Railway.

The LSJR split off of the T&N just north of the station in Stouffville, used today for GO Transit service to Toronto. It ran north-west for about 5 kilometres (0 mi) to a point just south of the Vandorf Sideroad, before turning northward to pass through the western side of Ballantrae. From there it ran north, paralleling the modern Ontario Highway 48, passing on the west side of Mount Albert, Baldwin and then into Sutton and Jackson's Point on the lakeshore. A large wye was constructed on the south west side of Sutton for turning the trains around. The connection to the CNoR lines was a somewhat smaller wye at Zephyr Junction, at the corner of Zephyr Road and York-Durham Line.

== See also ==
- List of Ontario railways
