= Toronto and Nipissing Railway =

First public narrow-gauge railway in North America

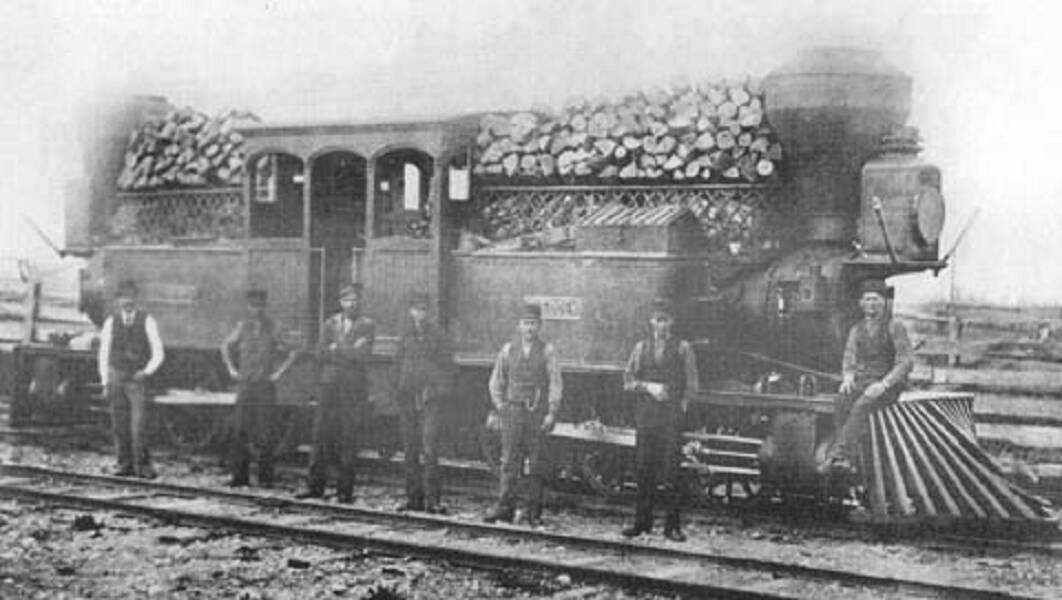
- Fairlie-patent double-boilered locomotive

Overview
- Headquarters: Toronto
- Locale: Ontario, Canada
- Dates of operation: 1868–1882; merged into Midland Railway of Canada in 1882; Grand Trunk Railway; and finally Canadian National, most abandoned in 1980s but GO Transit service survives from Toronto to Stouffville, and York Durham Heritage Railway from Stouffville to Uxbridge

Technical
- Track gauge: 4 ft 8 1/2 in (1,435 mm) standard gauge from 1881
- Previous gauge: 3 ft 6 in (1,067 mm) until 1881

The Toronto and Nipissing Railway (T&N) was the first public narrow-gauge railway in North America. It chartered in 1868 to build from Toronto to Lake Nipissing in Ontario, Canada, via York, Ontario, and Victoria counties. At Nipissing it would meet the transcontinental lines of the Canadian Pacific, providing a valuable link to Toronto. It opened in 1871, with service between Scarborough and Uxbridge. By December 1872 it was extended to Coboconk, but financial difficulties led to plans of the line being built further abandoned at this point. The railway merged with the Midland Railway of Canada in 1882.

A series of mergers, bankruptcies and ownership changes eventually turned this right of way into the CN Uxbridge Subdivision, at least the portions north of the CN Kingston Subdivision at Scarborough Junction. Passenger service was offered to Markham and then Stouffville, before the service passed to Via Rail, and then to GO Transit in 1982. The lines are currently used both by CN in the southern reaches for freight, as well by GO for interurban rail service as their Stouffville line. The lines are still in place as far as Uxbridge, and the section between Stouffville and Uxbridge is used by the York-Durham Heritage Railway for tourist runs.

== Early history ==
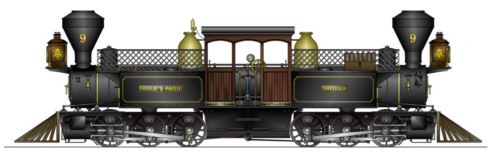
Toronto and Nipissing Fairlie 0-6-6-0 No. 9 Shedden built by the Avonside Engine Company, Bristol, England, 1871

Early development of railways in the Province of Canada, which consisted of Canada East (Quebec) and Canada West (Ontario), was delayed by lack of capital and industrial infrastructure. The first major national railway development was the construction of the Grand Trunk Railway of Canada on a gauge of 5 ft 6 in (1,676 mm) from Portland, Maine to Sarnia, Canada West via Montreal and Toronto, with a branch from Richmond to Levis near Quebec City. Investment funds for railways were scarce in the Province of Canada because the economy was mainly agricultural, and most capital was tied up in land. The line was constructed by the English contractors Peto, Brassey and Betts, who undertook to raise the capital required in London if they obtained the contract. As a result of the exorbitant cost of land and charters, overbuilding stone bridges and stations to English standards, and initial lack of traffic to support the capital cost, the line was soon insolvent. This failure, together with a severe recession and the American Civil War, meant that no more capital could be raised and almost no railways were built in Canada during the 1860s.

There was a return of confidence with the Confederation of the British North American colonies into Canada in 1867, and the political promise of a transcontinental railway to the Pacific. Merchants, industrialists, and politicians of Toronto, Ontario and surrounding counties began to look for ways of opening up the back country 'bush' north of the city to settlement and trade. Lakes and rivers had been the principal means of transportation, but they were frozen and unusable for 4–5 months of the year. Road construction was primitive; trees were cut down and laid side by side in swamps to form 'corduroy' roads. Most roads were passable in winter (hard frozen) and summer (hard baked), but impassable mud troughs in spring and fall. Railways were essential, but had to be built cheaply enough to serve a wild and unsettled region.

== Choice of narrow gauge, promotion and financing ==
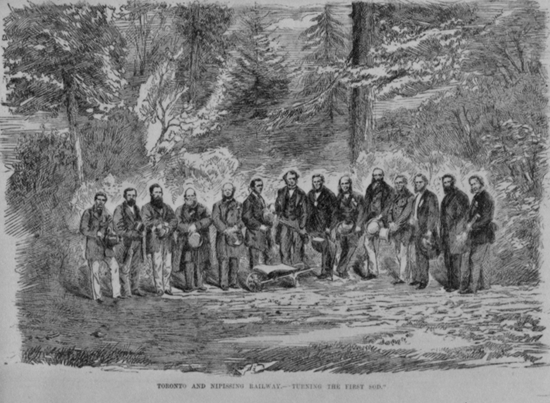
Turning the sod on the T&N.

A charismatic Scots-born Toronto wharfinger and trader, George Laidlaw, took up the challenge. He was a business associate of the powerful Gooderham and Worts Distillery interests, and other Toronto bankers and merchants. Laidlaw advertised in newspapers in London, England for suggestions as to how railways might be built more cheaply in Canada. He received a reply from Carl Abraham Pihl, first managing engineer of Norway's Railway Construction Bureau. Pihl had worked on the construction, under Robert Stephenson, of the first Norwegian trunk railway – the Hovedbanen from Christiania (today Oslo) to Eidsvoll – which opened in 1854, where the same issues of overbuilding a line in a small farming and fishing economy had led to an unaffordable railway. He now advocated the use of the narrow gauge of 3 ft 6 in (1,067 mm) with all major construction in wood, which system he had developed since the early 1860s. Pihl's ideas had been noticed in Britain where the smaller Ffestiniog Railway was also proving a success. After a visit to Norway, the 3 ft 6 in gauge was taken up by Sir Charles Fox and Sons, the firm founded by the eminent engineer and constructor of the Crystal Palace at the Great Exhibition of 1851. Fox had a very influential consulting practice throughout the former British Empire and Colonies and was instrumental in gaining acceptance for the 3 ft 6 in (1,067 mm) gauge in Canada, New Zealand, Australia and South Africa.

The choice of the narrow gauge led to vigorous challenges in London, England and Canada. Zerah Colburn, the editor of the London technical journal Engineering, used its columns to violently criticise the advice of Douglas Fox, the elder son of Sir Charles Fox, to the promoters, and this was taken up by the Hamilton Spectator, which supported that town's claim to be the hub (rather than Toronto) of railway traffic for western Ontario. Abraham Fitzgibbon, the chief engineer of the Queensland Railways, came to the aid of the promoters with a speech in Toronto. The main opposition to the narrow gauge came from the Wellington, Grey and Bruce Railway in the west and the Port Whitby and Port Perry Railway in the east. Both lines were proposing to build competing lines on the 5 ft 6 in (1,676 mm) "Provincial gauge", and claimed that the choice of the narrow gauge was a ruse to ensure that all the traffic of the districts would be exclusively trans-shipped at Toronto, rather than Hamilton and Whitby. The opposition narrowly failed to defeat the narrow gauge, and provincial charters were granted to the Toronto and Nipissing Railway and the Toronto, Grey and Bruce Railway on March 4, 1868.

George Laidlaw sought to raise money to finance the construction of the narrow-gauge railways by the following means, in order of preference:

- Bonuses approved by vote of taxpayers from each township and county on the route of the line
- Provincial government grants per mile of track built, under the "Aid to Railways Act"
- Sale of stock
- Sale of bonds
- Loans

Laidlaw and other directors fanned out through the townships, speaking at taxpayer meetings in support of bonuses for the railways. His messianic style at these meetings often generated so much enthusiasm that motions were immediately approved to grant large sums in support of the lines. On the morrow, the local politicians often had second and more sober thoughts and sought to control the process themselves, trying to dictate where and when the money would be spent, and on what. Long, drawn-out campaigns ensued, with businessmen and progressive farmers whose lots would be near the line advocating large unconditional grants, and those in more distant locations opposing the free bonuses of tax money. Generally, the response of the settlers, anxious to expand opportunities for trade and travel, was generous. But, when strongly opposed, Laidlaw's combative and insulting responses could generate such opposition that townships delayed contributing money for years, or refused entirely.

Contrary to the hopes of the promoters, the proceeds from bonuses, grants, and stock sales fell short of paying for construction of the roadbed and structures. This deficit, and the cost of purchasing iron and equipment, had to be made up by issuing bonds whose guaranteed interest payments were a heavy burden on the income of the T&NR, and ultimately were to prove fatal to its prospects. Gooderham and Worts had a vital interest in maintaining supplies of firewood for fuel and grain for its production processes, and for several years it was loans and other support from the distillery company which kept the T&NR afloat.

The Nipissing Act of Parliament was vague, and even the promoters were uncertain for some time as to the exact scope of the proposed railway. The T&NR Prospectus of April 1869 speaks of an 85-mile (137 km) ‘first section’ to Coboconk, with a branch of 10 miles (16 km) to the town of Lindsay. Such a branch was never built by the T&NR, although the connection was eventually made by the Whitby, Port Perry, and Lindsay Railway via a junction at Blackwater. The first objectives were the towns of Markham and Stouffville in York County, and Uxbridge in Ontario County. These could be reached on a direct line through the well-established villages of Scarborough Township. Once at Uxbridge (55 km or 34 mi), Laidlaw's next objective was Lake Nipissing (300 km or 190 mi) and a junction with the future Pacific Railway. The provisional mainline terminus of the T&NR, on the way to Lake Nipissing, was to be Coboconk.

On the lower and longer settled part of the line, as far as Uxbridge, municipal bonuses were generally given freely and generously, but beyond that place townships were sometimes less enthusiastic. Whitchurch, Reach, and Mariposa accounted for 11 miles (18 km) of line, but gave nothing. Further north, some remote townships such as Bexley responded handsomely. The T&NR's main opponents were the Northern Railway of Canada in the west and the Port Whitby and Port Perry Railway in the east. Neither seriously blocked its territorial advance but were instrumental in persuading some townships not to vote bonuses.

Surveys of a line beyond Coboconk, and as far as Minden, Ontario, were made, but it was never found economic to blast a way through such rough uninhabited territory, and the line never did go to Lake Nipissing.

The lack of communications in that part of east York County lying between the line of the Northern Railway of Canada through Newmarket, and the Toronto and Nipissing Railway through Uxbridge convinced local politicians that a cheap narrow-gauge line connecting with the T&NR at Stouffville and running north to Lake Simcoe near Sutton would enhance the agricultural and forest trade in the area and tap the Lake Simcoe steamer traffic. The 26 mile, 3 ft 6 in gauge line was promoted as the Lake Simcoe Junction Railway.

== Engineering ==
The Toronto and Nipissing Railway and the Toronto, Grey and Bruce Railways were promoted at the same time, and with similar objectives, by an interlocking group of Ontario businessmen and politicians. It is not surprising that the group should decide to economise by employing one chief engineer who would apply the same design principles and choices on both lines. The first consulting engineer in Canada was John Edward Boyd of New Brunswick, who conducted the preliminary surveys over the ground to Uxbridge and Orangeville. Douglas Fox came to Canada several times in 1868 and 1869 to support the parliamentary campaign and verify the surveys. On his return to England in the summer of 1869, he made arrangements for an associate, Edmund Wragge, to come to Canada at once to take up the engineering of both lines. In August, Wragge visited Pihl in Norway to see his narrow-gauge lines, and arrived in Toronto in September 1869. The tenders for the first sections of line were immediately put out.

The engineering of the T&NR and the LSJR was of a much less substantial nature than on the TG&BR, with only one significant trestle over the Rouge River between Unionville and Markham. The ruling gradient was 2% or 1:50 between Goodwood and Uxbridge, and the minimum curvature was 600 ft (183 m). Wragge appointed John Charles Bailey as his first resident engineer on the T&NR. When Wragge became general manager of the TG&BR in 1874, Bailey became chief engineer of the Toronto and Nipissing Railway. Bailey was also the chief engineer for the construction of the Lake Simcoe Junction Railway.

== Construction ==
The successful contract bidder on the first section of the Toronto and Nipissing Railway as far as Uxbridge was John Ginty of Toronto. The first 9 miles (14 kilometres) used a third rail on the 5 ft 6 in (1,676 mm)-gauge Grand Trunk Railway easterly from Toronto's Berkeley Street Station to Scarborough Junction. The line became the first Canadian narrow-gauge common carrier when opened to Uxbridge on 12 July 1871. Much of the contract beyond Uxbridge was undertaken by Edward Wheler, a miller and businessman of Stouffville, and 87 miles (140 kilometres) of rail line was opened to Coboconk on 26 November 1872. The panic of 1873 halted further construction toward Lake Nipissing. In 1876, the Lake Simcoe Junction Railway Company, formed by citizens of York County, awarded a contract to John Naismith and Co. (in association with Frank Shanly) to build a 25-mile (40-kilometre) line from Stouffville Junction to Sutton and a Lake Simcoe steamer dock at Jackson's Point. This branch line was opened in December 1877.

== Stations ==
=== Coboconk ===
The historic building was relocated to its present location off Portage Road west of Highway 35 (Laidlaw Heritage Village) in 1995 and is now used by 314 Hood Royal Canadian Sea Cadets. Formerly, it was near the RONA Tri-county Building Supplies store at 44°39′39.0″N 78°48′02.8″W.

=== Kirkfield ===
The station was located in the village of Kirkfield in the Kawartha Lakes, near 1834 Victoria Road on the east side. 44°34′12″N 78°00′50″W. The 1892 stationed burned down in 2001.

=== Eldon ===
In Eldon, Ontario on southside of Eldon Station Road west of Prospect Road. 44°30′33″N 79°58′58″W. Station burned down or demolished in 1962.

=== Lorneville ===
Junction with the Midland Railway of Canada. 44°25′14″N 79°00′25″W. Station moved over.

=== Cannington ===
Stationed burned down in fire in 1968, Mount Albert Station is relocated to Cannington Community Centre off of Elliot Street.

=== Sunderland ===
Station demolished 1969.

=== Blackwater ===
Junction with a connecting spur to Coboconk. One storey wood station demolished in the 1960s and station area now part of conservation area. Tracks removed but now used as trail. Bridge on west side of Highway 7/12 used for users on trail.

=== Uxbridge ===
Station still exists and used by York-Durham Heritage Railway. See Uxbridge railway station (Ontario).

=== Goodwood ===
Demolished in 1960 and only a siding remains. 44°02′10″N 79°11′51″W Flag stop shelter replaced station and removed in 1980s when passenger service by CN ended in 1978.

=== Stouffville ===
See Stouffville GO Station. 1886 station burned down and last station demolished in 1982 was converted house and annex added.

=== Markham ===
Restored and in use as station. See Markham GO Station

=== Unionville ===
Used as station until 1991 and now a community centre. See Unionville Station

=== Scarborough ===
Formerly near Scarborough GO Station the 1871 station burned down in 1960. Now site vacant land between tracks.

=== Toronto ===
Berkeley Street Station west of the Gooderham and Worts Distillery. Now parking lot north of Parliament Square Park.

== Locomotives ==
The first locomotive on the T&NR was a small 4-4-0 ordered from the Avonside Engine Company by George Laidlaw, and John Shedden during a visit to England in the Spring of 1869. This was before the appointment of Edmund Wragge as Chief Engineer, and it is likely that they were advised to order it by Douglas Fox based on his similar recommendations for the Queensland Railways. The largest order placed by the T&NR was for six small 4-4-0s from the Canadian Engine & Machinery Company of Kingston, Ontario delivered in 1870–71. It is significant that John Shedden, President of the T&NR, was also a Director of CE&MC. In 1872 a Fairlie 0-6-6-0T was received from Avonside together with another, larger, 4-6-0. Then followed two small 4-6-0s and one large 4-6-0 from Avonside. The most successful of all these locomotives, judged by their utilisation, were the Avonside 4-6-0s. Four of the locomotives were damaged beyond repair during a January 1883, fire at Uxbridge, Ontario and the remainder were sold following gauge standardisation and amalgamation with the Midland Railway of Canada.

The numbers and names of these T&NR locomotives have long been confused in early historical reviews, and the errors repeated in subsequent publications. Reference to the original company records held by Library and Archives Canada, the published Annual Reports of the company, and the Avonside Engine Company records held at the Leeds Industrial Museum (UK) have established the correct numbering and naming, cited below.

Number	Builder	Type	Date	Works number	Notes
1	Avonside Engine Company	4-4-0	September 1870	808	named Gooderham & Worts. Sold by Midland Railway, 1883–84
2	Canadian Engine & Machinery Company	4-4-0	November 1870	83	named M C Cameron. Damaged beyond repair by fire, at Uxbridge, January 14, 1883
3	Canadian Engine & Machinery Company	4-4-0	December 1870	84	named R Walker & Son. Sold by Midland Railway, 1883–84
4	Canadian Engine & Machinery Company	4-4-0	early 1871	85	named Rice Lewis & Son. Damaged beyond repair by fire, at Uxbridge, January 14, 1883
5	Canadian Engine & Machinery Company	4-4-0	March 1871	86	named Joseph Gould. Damaged beyond repair by fire, at Uxbridge, January 14, 1883
6	Canadian Engine & Machinery Company	4-4-0	May 1871	87	named Uxbridge. Sold by Midland Railway, 1883–84
7	Canadian Engine & Machinery Company	4-4-0	May 1871	88	named Eldon. Sold by Midland Railway, 1883–84
8	Avonside Engine Company	4-6-0	December 1871	867	named Toronto. Sold by Midland Railway, 1883–84
9	Avonside Engine Company	0-6-6-0T Fairlie	December 1871	864 & 865	named Shedden. Damaged beyond repair by fire, at Uxbridge, January 14, 1883
10	Avonside Engine Company	4-6-0	early 1873	Uncertain but probably one of 931-934	named Coboconk. Sold by Midland Railway, 1883–84
11	Avonside Engine Company	4-6-0	1872	Uncertain but probably one of 935-939	named Bexley. Sold by Midland Railway, 1883–84
12	Avonside Engine Company	4-6-0	early 1873?	Uncertain but probably one of 935-939	named Brock. Sold by Midland Railway, 1883–84

== Rolling stock ==
Based partly on contemporary British railway practice, the experience of Sir Charles Fox and Sons on the Queensland Railways, and Carl Abraham Pihl's work in Norway, the early rolling stock was intended to consist of short four-wheel boxcars, and longer six-wheel flat and passenger cars using Clark's radial axle arrangement. The four-wheel boxcars were reliable and suited the traffic at first, but became too small for the increasing traffic, and were not added to after 1874. Many became wayside grounded tool vans after gauge standardisation. The first longer flatcars were built using imported sets of Clark's radial gear and put into service with the construction contractors. The intention was that they would go more easily around tight curves. Whether through bad design, poor assembly, or abuse and heavy uneven loading by the construction gangs, the six-wheel cars proved disastrously prone to derailment and were soon put aside in favour of cars re-equipped with two standard North American four-wheel trucks (bogies). The passenger cars were never used in six-wheel form due to safety concerns.

Most of the T&NR freight and passenger cars were built by the St. Lawrence Foundry, on Parliament Street, Toronto; the foundry was just a short distance from the main T&NR locomotive and car depot at Berkeley Street. William Hamilton, the owner of the foundry, was a substantial investor in the T&NR. Based on contemporary sources the passenger cars were painted a 'straw' colour.

== Operation ==
Passenger and freight traffic on the Toronto and Nipissing Railway grew strongly at first, challenging the ability of the line to carry all that was offered. Lumber and firewood traffic always remained strong. The T&NR directors reacted promptly by buying substantial numbers of new locomotives and freight cars, but then the effects of poor grain harvests and the business recession of the mid-late 1870s weighed heavily on the line's ability to pay a return on the capital invested. Operating ratios (costs/receipts) were no worse than other small Ontario railways of the period, but substantially worse than those of large railways such as the GTR and CPR. The gross profit was barely equivalent to 5-6% on its outstanding bonds, which had been sold with a guaranteed return of 7-8%. This left nothing for the stockholders, or for renewals of equipment and trackage. The LSJR branch to Sutton and Lake Simcoe did not add an amount of traffic proportional to the cost of construction.

The typical passenger service consisted of two trains per day each way between Midland Junction (Lorneville) and Toronto; one of these trains extended to Coboconk; there was only one return trip each day from Sutton to Stouffville. The small narrow-gauge engines were able to cope with normal winter weather, but there was no money for snow clearing after severe storms and Gooderham and Worts sometimes paid for this work in order to maintain their distillery fuel supplies. Sometimes it took a month to clear the line with manual labour. There were few public accidents, but a severe toll of industrial fatalities to the operating staff. The most dangerous job was brakeman, with many young men being crippled or killed when walking along the tops of vehicles to manually screw down brakes, and when manually coupling cars using the highly dangerous link and pin couplers. The worst accident occurred when the boiler of the Fairlie engine Shedden (see illustration above) exploded at Stouffville on January 31, 1874, due to the safety valves being tied down to increase haulage power, killing three enginemen.

== Change of gauge and absorption by the Midland Railway of Canada ==
The poor financial returns on investment of all small Ontario railways in the late 1870s caused severe discontent among the bondholders. Many charged that the T&NR's troubles were due to the narrow gauge which made freight haulage uneconomic, but in fact the line's financial performance was better than most of its neighbours, and there was no lack of capacity. The real issue was overcapacity during a protracted traffic slump. The T&NR along with several other bankrupt lines was amalgamated in early 1882 into the Midland Railway of Canada. The MRC by this time was a proxy for the Grand Trunk Railway in its fight with the CPR for control of Ontario rail traffic. The Midland quickly laid a third rail in the track from Midland Junction (Lorneville) to Scarborough Junction and thus gained prized standard-gauge access to Toronto. The narrow-gauge third rail was removed by 1883, and the whole Midland Railway of Canada was leased by the Grand Trunk Railway on January 1, 1884.

== Heritage railway ==
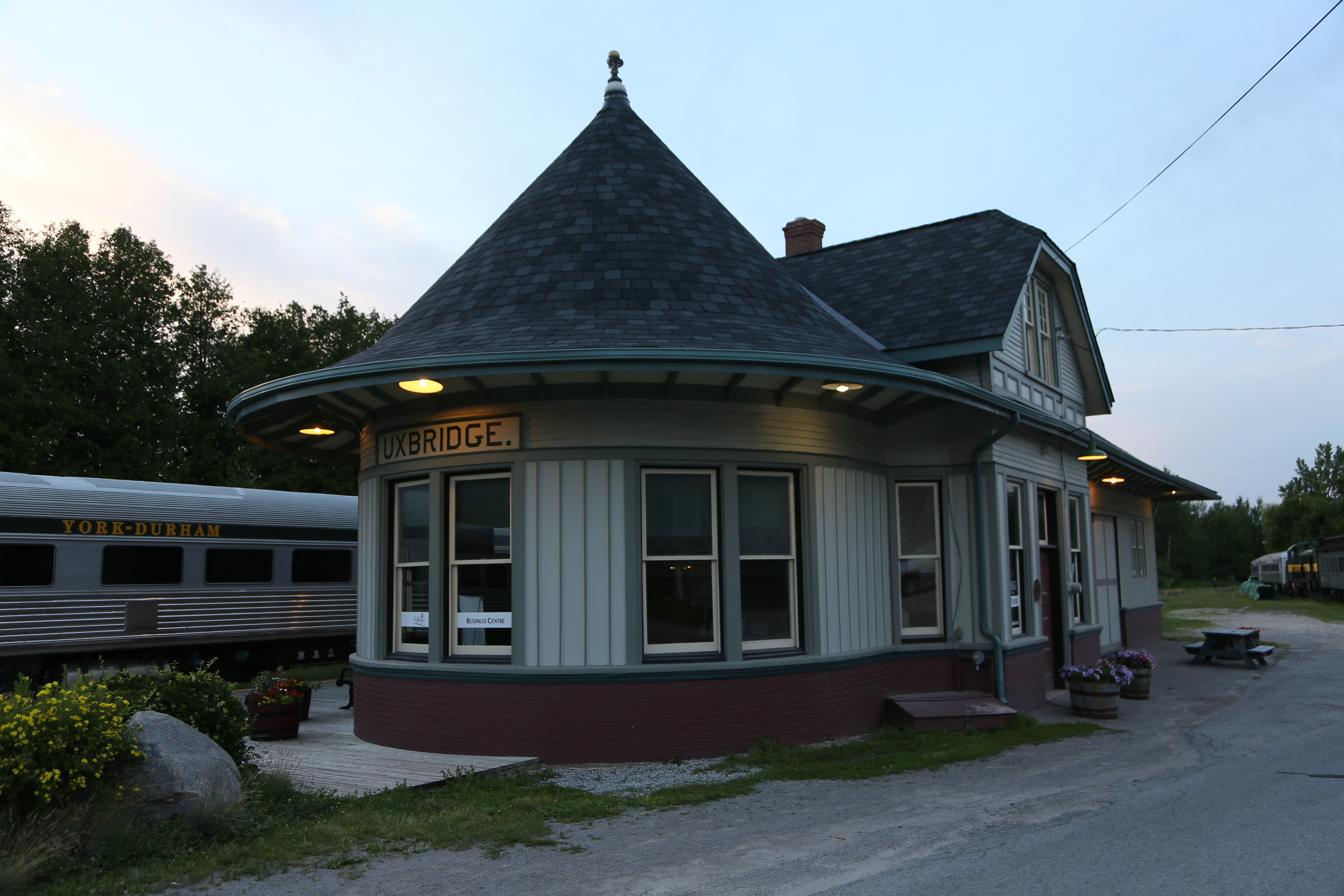
Heritage railway carriage at Uxbridge station

The York-Durham Heritage Railway operates since 1996 on weekends from June through mid-October with Santa Runs in late November to mid December over 4 weekends, between the Uxbridge Station on the Metrolinx Uxbridge Subdivision and the Stouffville GO Station. YDHR declared bankruptcy in January 2024. All assets of the YDHR have been sold as of August 2024.

== See also ==
- Toronto, Grey and Bruce Railway
- Narrow-gauge railways in Canada
- List of gauge conversions
- List of Ontario railways
- Rail transport in Ontario
- History of rail transport in Canada
