= York–Durham Heritage Railway =

Former heritage railway in Ontario, Canada

Coordinates: 44°06′37″N 79°07′29″W

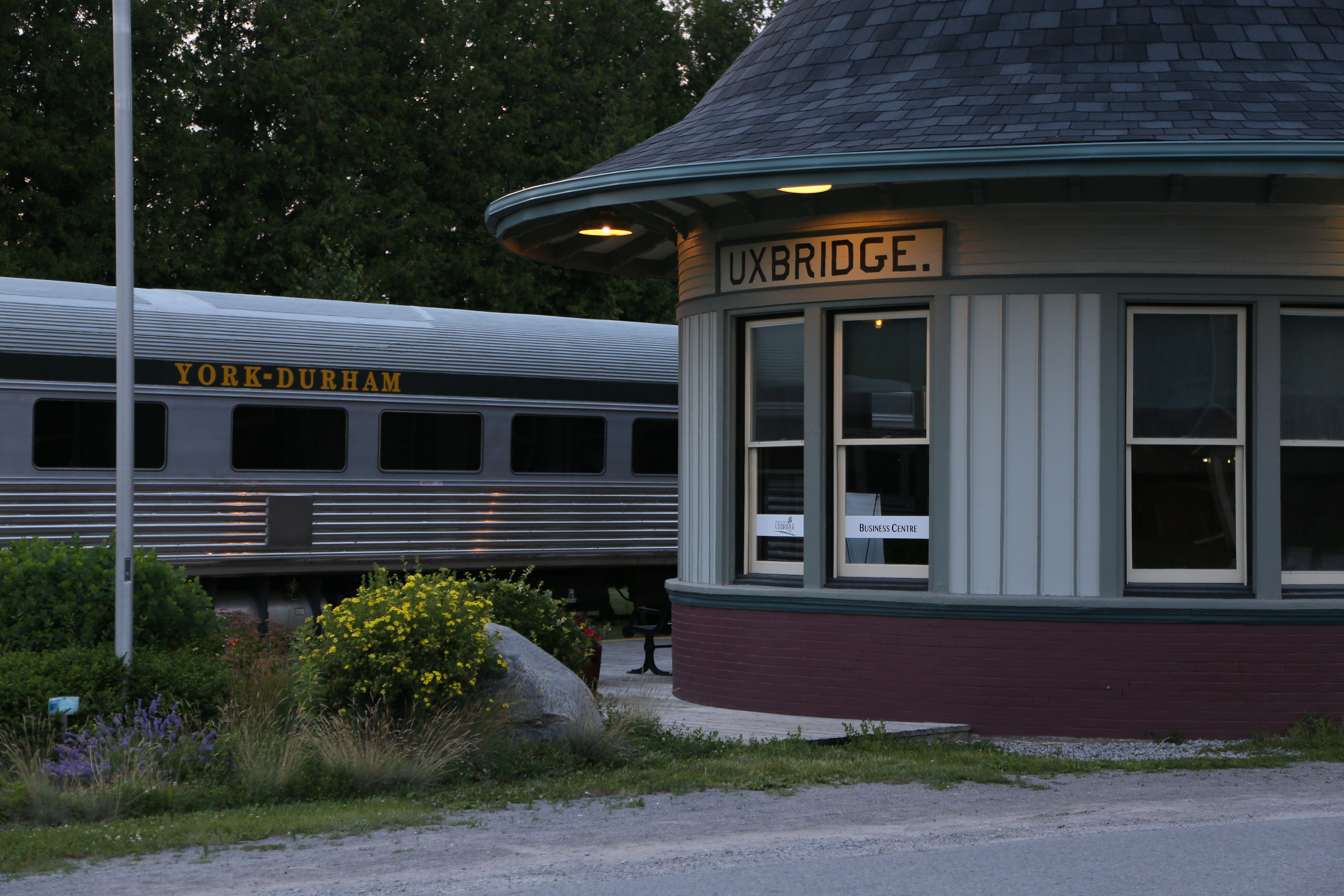
- York–Durham railway coach at Uxbridge station
- Locale: Ontario
- Terminus: Stouffville GO Station; Uxbridge station

Commercial operations
- Built by: William Gooderham; T&NR(?)
- Original gauge: 3 ft 6 in (1,067 mm) (until 1883); 1,435 mm (4 ft 8 1/2 in) (since 1882)

Preserved operations
- Reporting mark: YDHR
- Stations: 2
- Length: 20 km (12 mi)
- Preserved gauge: 1,435 mm (4 ft 8 1/2 in) standard gauge

Commercial history
- Opened: 1868 as Toronto and Nipissing Railway

Preservation history
- 1996: Opened
- 2024: Permanently Closed
- Headquarters: Uxbridge

Website
- York-Durham Heritage Railway

The York–Durham Heritage Railway was a heritage railway in both the York Region and the Durham Region of Ontario, Canada, north of Toronto.

The railway formerly operated excursion trains from Uxbridge. Trips had various travel times depending on the event or festival.

The railway ran on the tracks of the former Toronto and Nipissing Railway. Metrolinx owns the tracks to Uxbridge, but operated GO Transit commuter trains no further than Old Elm GO Station, the northern terminal of the Stouffville line.

YDHR began operations in 1996 as an all-volunteer run Heritage Association. During the late 2010s the organization changed business models to become a mix of volunteer and paid staff, led by CEO John Perks. In 2022 the railway reported financial difficulties, and as of January 2024 has ceased all operations and filed for bankruptcy protection.

== Operations ==
The Township of Uxbridge owns Uxbridge's heritage railway station but leases the tracks and Uxbridge's railyard from the province through Metrolinx, a provincial agency. The York–Durham Heritage Railway was an incorporated registered charity. The township was the railway's landlord.

The York–Durham Heritage Railway operated non-stop from the Uxbridge Station on the Metrolinx Uxbridge Subdivision.

Trains were usually scheduled on weekends from June through mid-October, and were pulled by an Alco RS-11 diesel locomotive, #3612, which was built for the Duluth, Winnipeg & Pacific Railway in 1956. Coaches included both vintage heavyweights built in the 1910s and 1920s, and lightweight cars from 1954.

The railway cars were stored at an open rail yard on Railway Street/King Street West in Uxbridge, Ontario. Several railway sheds are on the yard. The most significant is the Uxbridge Station, built in 1904.

Initially, YDHR staff consisted entirely of volunteers. In later years, as ridership increased, paid staff increasingly supplemented the volunteers. At the same time, the YDHR board of directors had a decreasing number of members from the local community. As of 2022, the YDHR was operated by nine full-time staff supplemented by 88 part-time and seasonal workers and volunteers of the York–Durham Heritage Railway Association.

By 2023, the township identified code and safety problems in YDHR's operations that the township wanted rectified. On January 21, 2024, the YDHR announced that all operations had ceased and the railway had filed for bankruptcy protection. The YDHR's chairperson admitted its business model had not been successful.

Later in 2024, the township started to prepare an RFP for a rail operator to restart a heritage train service. However, Metrolinx, as owner of the rail line, convinced the township to abandon the idea due to potential new obligations related to oversight, insurance, and liability as well as the prospect of new fleet acceptance requirements.

As of April 1st, 2026, all of the remaining YDHR rolling stock has been removed from the property.

== Railway History ==
The Uxbridge Subdivision was built in 1871 as the Toronto and Nipissing Railway, a 3 ft 6 in (1,067 mm) narrow-gauge line. The line was converted to 4 ft 8 1/2 in (1,435 mm) standard gauge shortly after being acquired by the Midland Railway in 1882. Following a series of mergers and acquisitions, the line became part of the Canadian National Railway (CN) in 1923.

In the 1980s, CN began to abandon the line. Tracks north of Uxbridge were lifted, but the line south of Uxbridge was purchased by GO Transit (now Metrolinx) to preserve it for possible Uxbridge - Toronto commuter rail service. Pending the introduction of such a service, the York-Durham Railway was the sole operator north of Old Elm station.

== Rolling stock ==
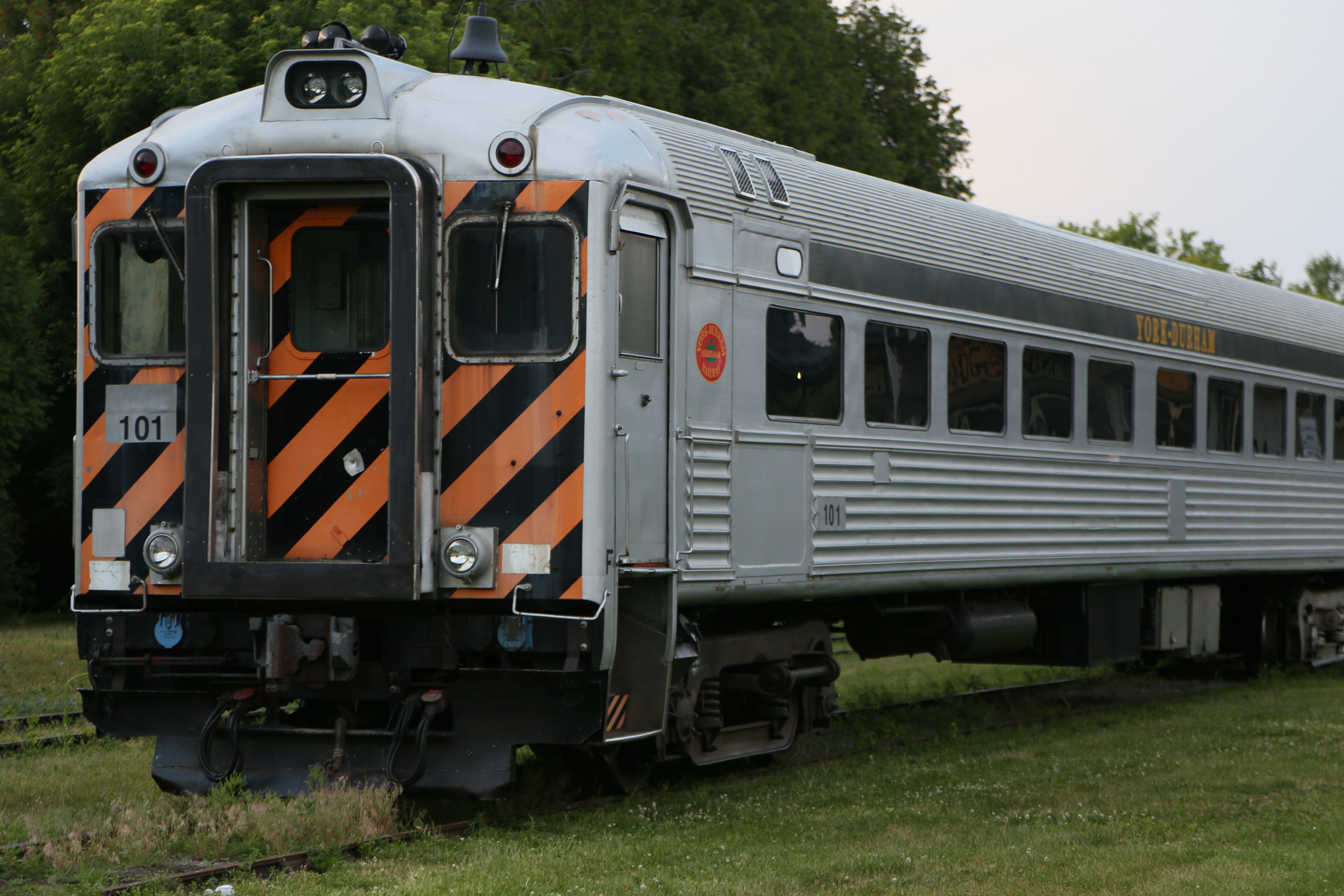
The Budd cars were converted from Rail Diesel Cars to coaches in 1982, while they were used by MBTA Commuter Rail. They were later used on the Champlain Flyer before eventually being acquired by YDHR in 2012.

=== Locomotives ===
- 1951 MLW RS-3 #1310; now at Prairie Sky Heritage Railway
- 1955 MLW RS-3 #22; now at Prairie Sky Heritage Railway
- 1956 ALCO RS-11 #3612; now at Prairie Sky Heritage Railway
- ONR 1603: GMD GP9 #1603 on lease to the YDHR 2023-2024

=== Passenger Cars ===
- 1919 Pullman Company Colonist sleeper #4960; scrapped onsite
- 1930 CCF Solarium/Lounge car #15041, (ex-CNR)
- 1949 ONR Pullman Coach 842; now at Prairie Sky Heritage Railway
- ONR cafe-bar coach 1408 and baggage car 9636; now with VIA Historical Association
- 1950s Coaches # 3233, 3209 (ex-CNR); later car scrapped
- 1954 ONR Pullman Diner car 1409 and Canadian Car and Foundry Entertainment coach 1410; now at Prairie Sky Heritage Railway
- 1955 "Boise Budd" coaches #101 - #106, built by Budd as Boston and Maine Railroad Budd Rail Diesel Cars, converted to unpowered coaches by M-K for the MBTA in 1982, later sold to Vermont Agency of Transportation, then to the Guelph Junction Express in 2008.

=== Non-passenger cars ===
- 1919 National Steel Car boxcar #406308 (ex-CNR)
- 1950 CCF flatcar #662339 (ex-CNR)
- 1953 caboose #434908 (ex-CPR)
- 1957 National Steel Car Baggage car #9636
- hopper car #165 (ex-Green Bay and Western Railway)
- 3 track inspection cars

== See also ==
- List of heritage railways in Canada
- Narrow gauge railways in Ontario
- List of Ontario railways
- Rail transport in Ontario
