= John Mills Jackson =

John Mills Jackson (c. 1764 – 1836) was a Canadian author, merchant, and justice of the peace.

Born on Saint Christopher Island, Jackson arrived in Canada in 1805. He inherited land in Lower Canada and bought additional land in Upper Canada. Jackson was a fierce critic of the executive of Upper Canada at the time, particularly Lieutenant Governor Francis Gore. In 1809 he published a pamphlet in London entitled A view of the political situation of the province of Upper Canada. In 1810 the assembly of Upper Canada passed a motion condemning Jackson's pamphlet, but no further action was taken.

In 1816 Jackson campaigned to represent York East in the Legislative Assembly of Upper Canada but was defeated by incumbent Thomas Ridout. He died while visiting England in 1836. He was survived by his children including daughter Augusta Mary Melissa Jackson (1795-1870), who was later the wife of Augustus Warren Baldwin.

Jackson's Point is named after Jackson and the land he acquired in 1819.
