= Nineteen on the Park =

Lebovic Centre for Arts & Entertainment – Nineteen on the Park
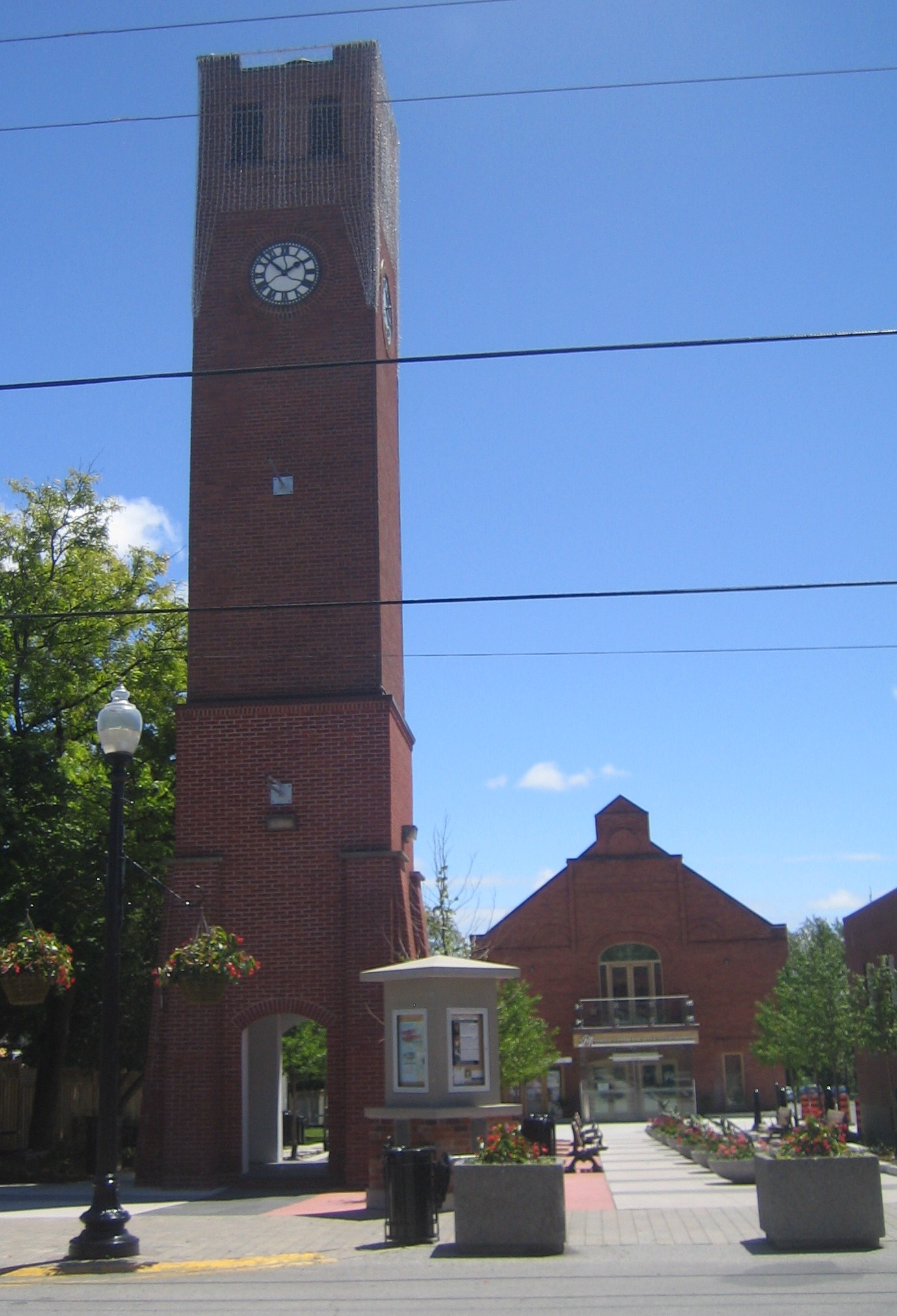
- Clock tower and Lebovic Centre
- Interactive map of the Lebovic Centre for Arts & Entertainment – Nineteen on the Park area
- Former names: Stouffville Town Hall

General information
- Status: Completed
- Type: Mixed-use
- Location: 19 Civic Avenue, Stouffville, Ontario, Canada
- Coordinates: 43.970936°N 79.245527°W
- Completed: 1896

Technical details
- Floor count: 2 floors

Lebovic Centre for Arts & Entertainment – Nineteen on the Park is an arts and entertainment venue in Stouffville, Ontario and one of the few historic buildings remaining in the town.

== Civic Use ==
Built in 1896, the two storey brick buildings features Romanesque Revival elements.

Originally a market/concert hall, it was later used as a movie theatre, bowling alley and billiard hall, garage before becoming Stouffville Town Hall and remained in use until the late 1990s (relocated to 37 Sandiford Drive and now at 111 Sandiford Drive) and used by artists until the mid 2000s.

== Arts Centre ==
The building was full renovated and converted as a multi-use venue (152 seat Great Hall theatre and community room) that opened in 2009. The building's naming rights is named for local home builder Lebovic Homes.

== See also ==
- Stouffville GO Station (C. 1869)
