= Uxbridge Urban Provincial Park =

Provincial urban park in Ontario, Canada

- IUCN category II (national park)
- Location within Southern Ontario
- Location: Southern Ontario, Canada
- Nearest city: Pickering
- Coordinates: 44°4′N 79°8′W
- Area: 532 ha (1,310 acres)
- Established: 2024
- Governing body: Ontario Parks

Uxbridge Urban Provincial Park is a provincial urban park located in Uxbridge, Ontario, Canada. The 532-hectare (1,310-acre) park was established on July 1, 2024, and operates year-round. Birdwatching and hiking are among the activities available in the park.

== History ==
On July 1, 2024, the Ontario government opened the Uxbridge Urban Provincial Park in the Township of Uxbridge. The park is the province's first urban provincial park. The park was first announced in the 2023 provincial budget, and the proposed urban park may include up to 532 hectares (1,315 acres) of provincially-owned lands.

== Description ==
Instead of a single connected block, the park is made up of individual parcels of lands within the Uxbridge area. And while they are not all currently connected, it is possible they might be linked by other lands, recreational areas, and trail systems in the future. These lands are located within rapidly growing urban areas, and also within the Oak Ridges Moraine.
