= Goodwood Kartways =

- Location: Uxbridge, Ontario, Canada
- Coordinates: 44.04735°N 79.22804°W
- Owner: Frank Di Leo
- Operator: Daniel Di Leo
- Major events: TRAK Championship; KartStars Canada Karting Championship; CKNA - Cup Karts Canada Division; 2009 Canadian National Karting Championship; 2013 Canadian National Karting Championship

Counter-clockwise road course
- Length: 0.8 km (0.50 mi)
- Turns: 10

Goodwood Kartways is a multiple configuration karting centre located in Uxbridge, Ontario, Canada. The facility spans 20 acres of land and features just shy of one kilometre of racing surface with a 10-turn road course. Since 1994 the facility has been owned and operated by the Di Leo family, brothers Marco and Daniel, father Frank and sister Stefanie.

== History ==
The circuit is one of the oldest operating kart racing facilities in North America. It has been operational for over 60 years. The race track has groomed Canadian race heroes such as Ron Fellows, Paul Tracy, and Daniel Morad

Goodwood Kartways has been operated by several different groups but owned by Frank Di Leo. Currently Daniel and Marco Di Leo run operations. Daniel and Marco are accomplished kart racers.

In 2003 The Sunoco Ron Fellows Championship Presented by Toronto Wheels was held at Goodwood Kartways where Daniel Di Leo competed in the senior competition. In 2005 and again in 2007 the facility hosted the fourth season opener of the series.

In 2009 the facility hosted the Canadian National Karting Championship. A multiple month expansion was performed to improve the quality of the facility to accommodate the karting community. The paddock area was expanded and increased by 50%, 1,200 square foot timing and scoring hut was built adjacent to the track and the track surface underwent reconditioning for a safety upgrade.

In 2011 Goodwood Kartways hosted the season opener of the 2011 Eastern Canadian Karting Championship.

In 2012 the facility underwent a major renovation. The track surface was completely repaved adding significant run off and a modern safety barrier for the first corner and extra run off as well as new curbing in several corners.

In 2013 the facility again hosted the Canadian National Karting Championship.

Goodwood Kartways is the home of the non-profit organization Toronto Racing Association of Karters

== Race Team ==
The Goodwood Kartways/Intrepid Canada race team represents the facility at both National and International Championships like the Florida Winter Tour, Champion Ron Fellows Karting Challenge, Pfaff Kartsport Cup and Canadian National Championships. The Di Leo family has also recently expanded their affiliation with Intrepid Canada to form Intrepid America.
