= Uxbridge station (Ontario) =

Railway station in Ontario, Canada

Uxbridge
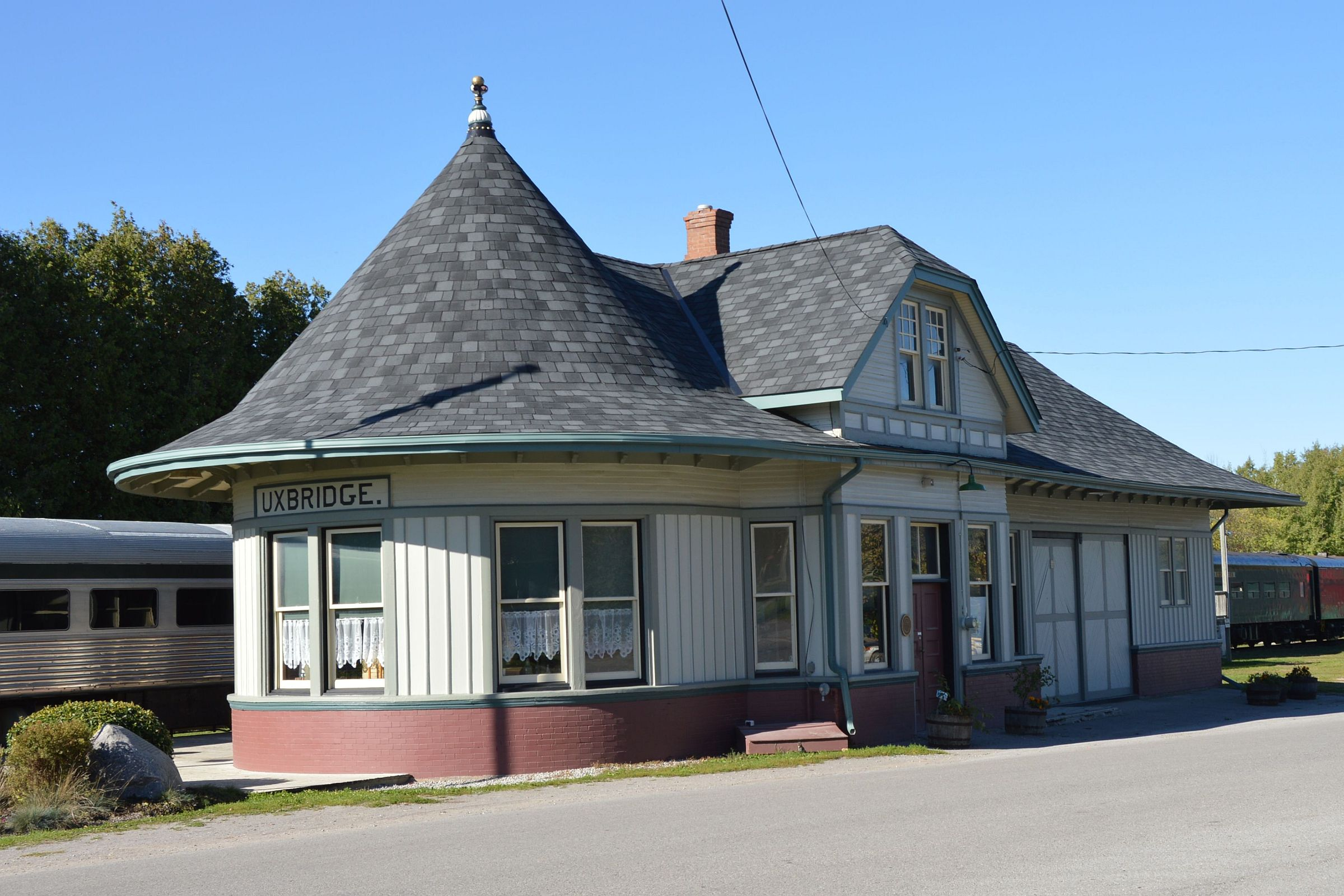
- Station in 2013, showing the witch's hat style roof

General information
- Location: 19 Railway Street, Uxbridge; Ontario, Canada
- Coordinates: 44°06′37″N 79°07′29″W
- Owner: Township of Uxbridge
- Connections: GO Transit (71); Durham Region Transit (605 and 905c)

Other information
- Status: Inactive as of 2024
- Station code: GO Transit: UXBA

History
- Original company: Toronto and Nipissing Railway; Midland Railway; Grand Trunk Railway; Canadian National Railway; York–Durham Heritage Railway

Proposed services
Preceding station	GO Transit	Following station
Old Elm towards Union	Stouffville	Terminus
Former services
Preceding station	York–Durham Heritage Railway	Following station
Stouffville Terminus	Stouffville–Uxbridge	Terminus
Preceding station	Canadian National Railway	Following station
Goodwood toward Toronto	Toronto – Belleville via Peterboro	Blackwater toward Belleville
Goodwood toward Toronto	Toronto – Port Hope via Peterboro	Blackwater toward Port Hope
Location

Uxbridge is a former railway station in Uxbridge, Ontario, that was part of the now defunct York–Durham Heritage Railway. The station building, constructed by the Grand Trunk Railway in 1904, is owned and maintained by the Township of Uxbridge and has been designated under Part IV of the Ontario Heritage Act.

== History ==
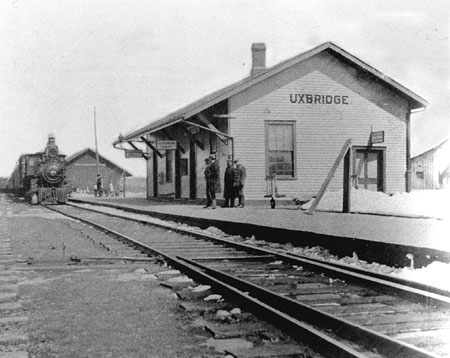
Original T&NR station of 1871

The Toronto and Nipissing Railway originally built a 3 ft 6 in (1,067 mm) narrow gauge line in the late 1860s, with service between Toronto and Uxbridge commencing in 1871. In late 1880 the line was converted to standard gauge and soon after this, due to financial reasons, was sold to the Midland Railway in 1881. The line was then firstly leased to the Grand Trunk Railway in 1884; eventually purchased by them in 1894; and finally transferred to Canadian National Railways in 1923.

Grand Trunk constructed the current station building in 1904, with its distinctive "witch's hat" roof, to replace the more basic shed structure that had previously been used.

The Township of Uxbridge bought the railway station from CN in 1988 for $1.00.

Due to the poor state of repair of the roof and the cost of renewal, closure of the heritage train station was discussed by the Township of Uxbridge Council in 2013. It was noted that the structure is important to the community and it is the only train station in Ontario with a witch's hat style roof that is being maintained in relatively good shape.

North of Uxbridge to Lindsay the line was abandoned in the early 1990s becoming part of Trans Canada Trail. That southerly section of trackbed was purchased by GO Transit to prevent abandonment and disposal, because Metrolinx has long term plans to expand service on the Stouffville line to Uxbridge.

The York–Durham Heritage Railway reopened the line to the south between Uxbridge and Stouffville in 1996, but ceased operations in 2024.

== Current status ==
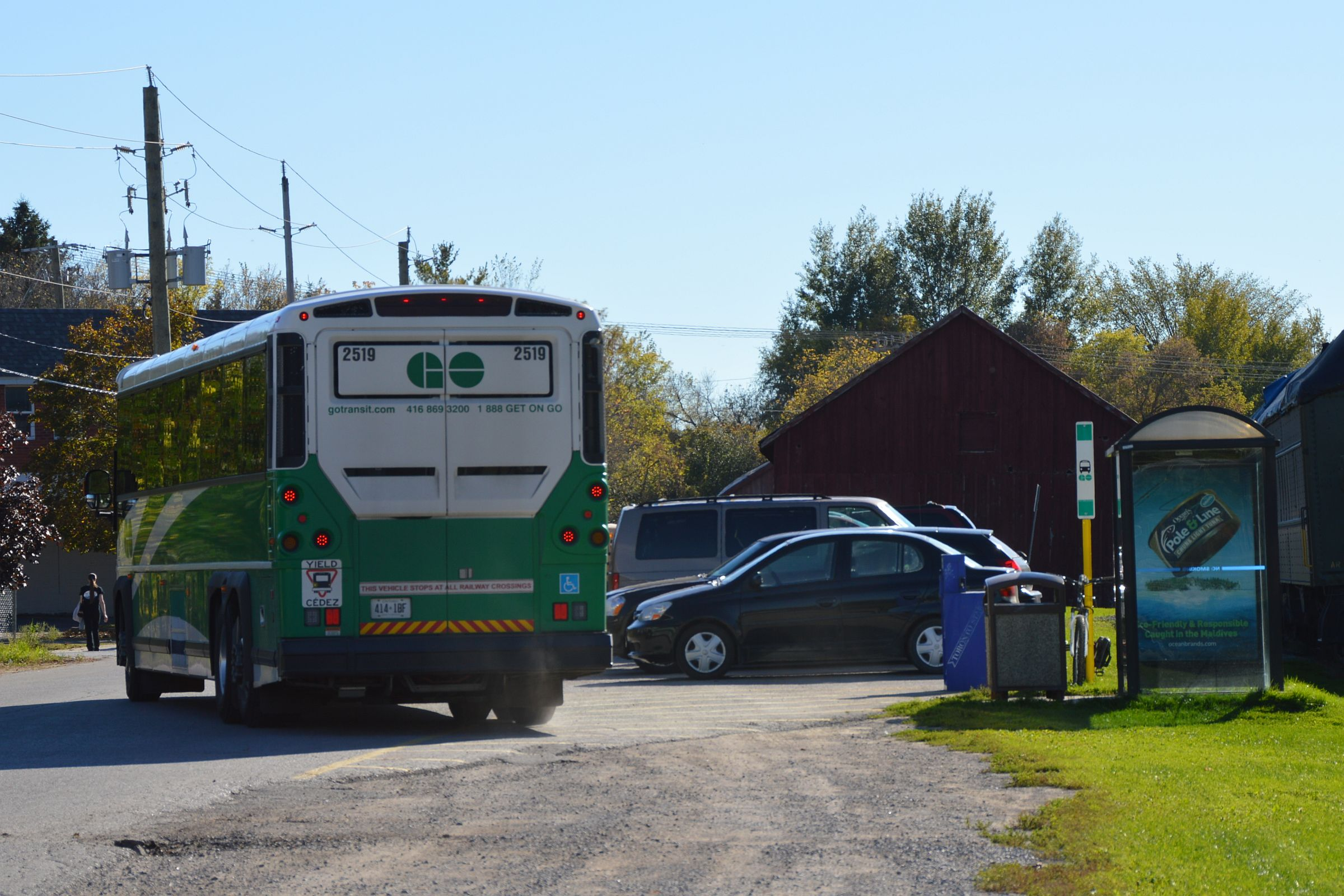
GO Bus terminus

The GO Transit Uxbridge Terminal for GO Transit buses (Route 71) is located along Railway Street near the station building. Durham Region Transit 605 (local) and 905C (connection to Port Perry with Uxbridge) buses also stop here.

The Township of Uxbridge makes the former the train station "available for short-term rental opportunities and supporting tourism initiatives". The township wants to include the train station and rail yard in its Downtown Revitalization Plans. Metrolinx, the owner of the rail line, convinced the township not to revive heritage rail operations due to potential liability and oligations.
