= Jackson's Point =

Coordinates: 44.3186°N 79.3926°W

- Unincorporated community
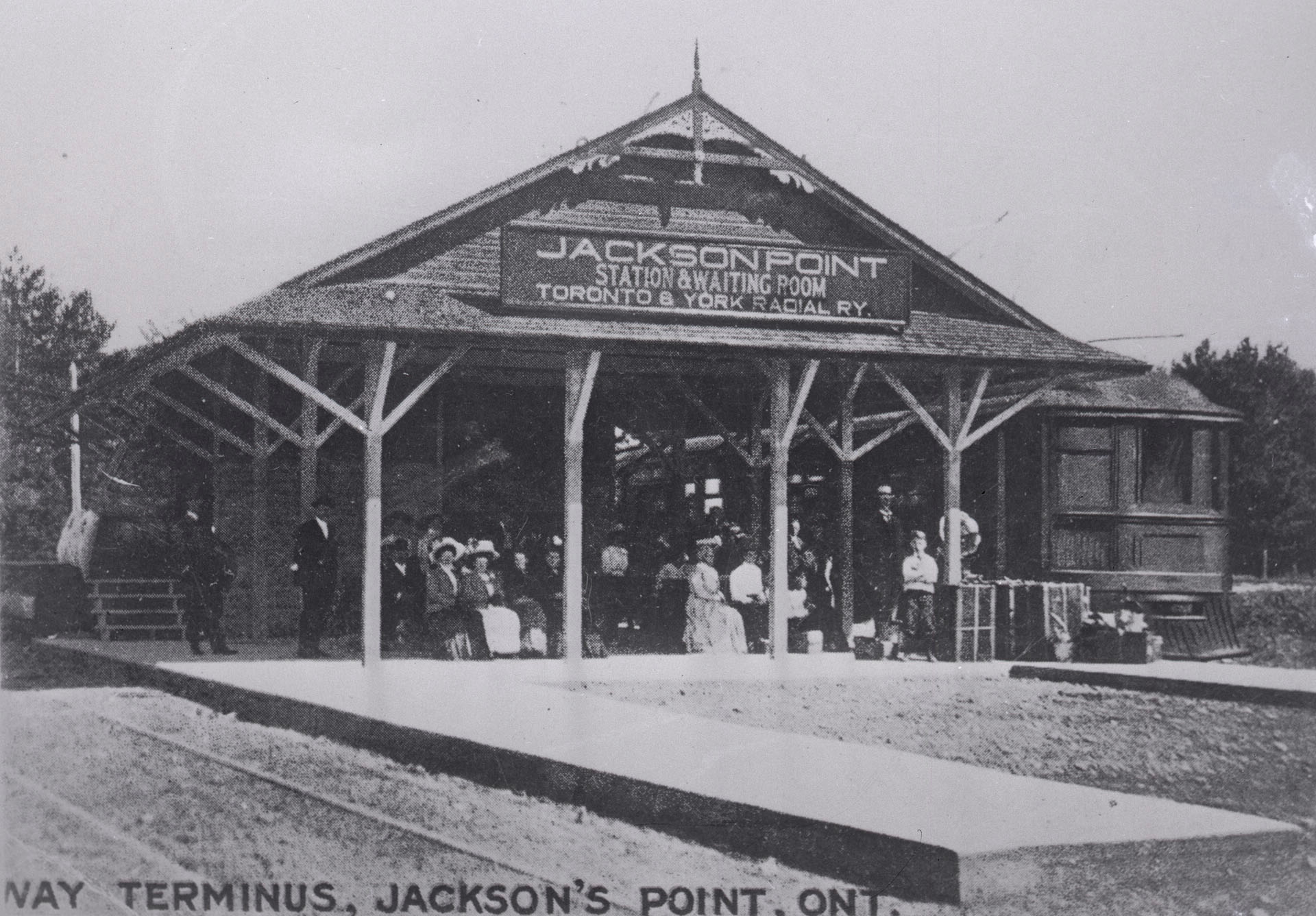
- Postcard of Jackson's Point Station, terminus for the Toronto and York Radial Railway, from the 1910s
- Interactive map of Jackson's Point
- Country: Canada
- Province: Ontario
- Regional Municipality: York Region
- Town: Georgina

Government
  - Township mayor: Margaret Quirk
  - Councillor: Dale Kerr Genge (ward 4)
- Time zone: UTC−5 (EST)
  - Summer (DST): UTC−4 (EDT)
- Forward sortation area: 1L0
- Area codes: 905 and 289

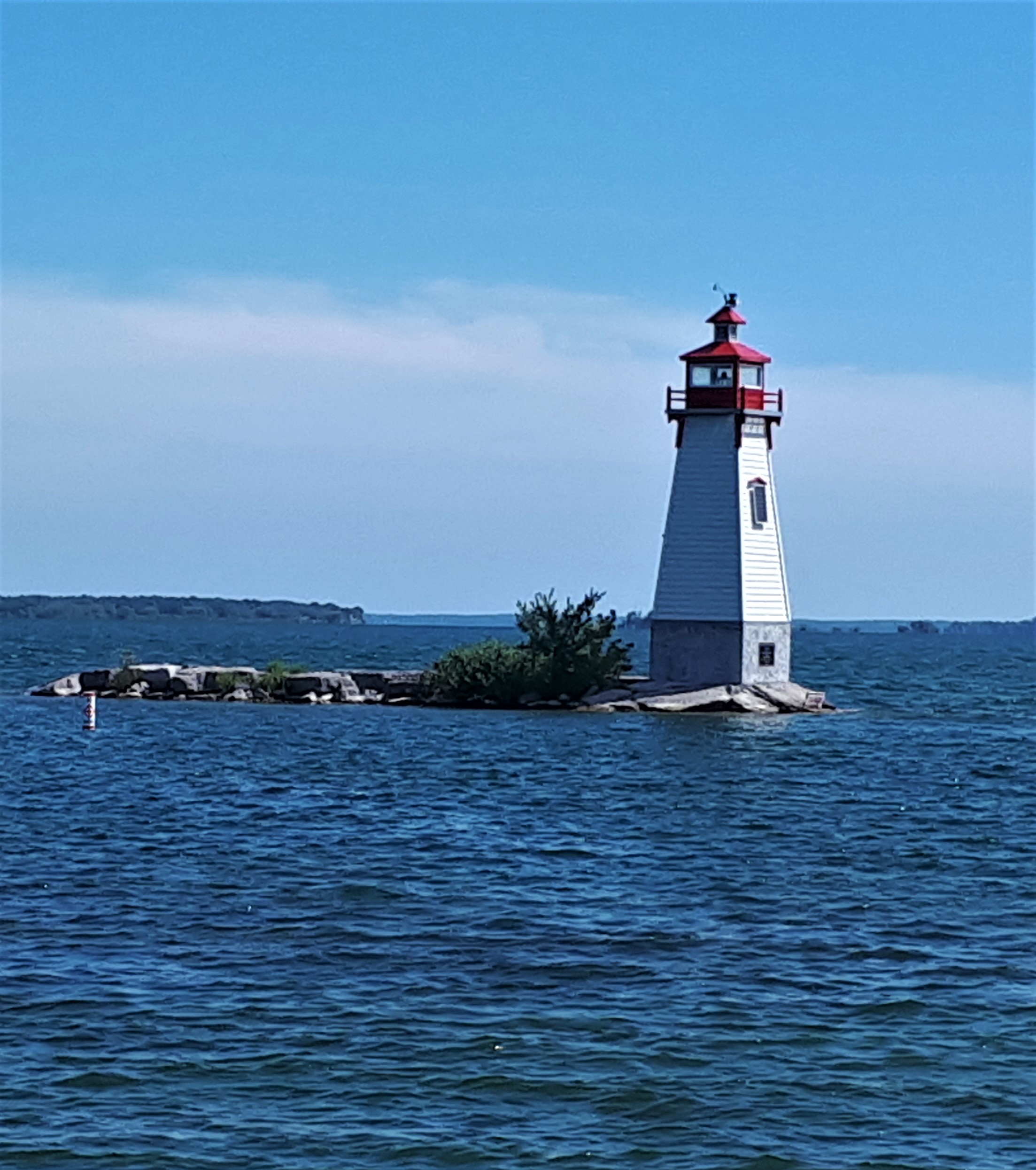
Jackson's Point Lighthouse

Jackson's Point is a summer resort harbour located in the township of Georgina, on Lake Simcoe in Ontario, Canada. It was originally part of a naval land grant made to Captain William Bourchier (December 9, 1791 – January 22, 1844) in 1819 (Bourchier was commander of the Provincial Marine's Lake Huron establishment out of Penetanguishene Naval Yard. John Mills Jackson settled the land, which was first used as a wharf facility for schooners travelling Lake Simcoe. Jackson acquired the land from James O'Brien Bourchier, brother of William and was father of William's wife Amelia Jackson. As transportation improved by steamers, and the arrival of railroads by 1877, seasonal residents began to settle in the area. Today, Jackson's Point harbour still caters to recreational boaters and campers, with the addition of small boutiques, street vendors, and live music.

Before roads and trucks began to provide means of transport of goods and people to the village, the railway was the best means to get to Jackson's Point.

From 1907 to 1930 Metropolitan Street Railway Lake Simcoe Line provided radial passenger rail service to Toronto from a station near today's Metro Road and Dalton Road. A second freight rail service from 1877 to 1929 rail under the Lake Simcoe Junction Railway and terminated at a shed near the northern end of Lorne Park.

The Salvation Army Conference Centre & Children's Camp is also located here. The campgrounds were first purchased by The Salvation Army in 1917, but the Army ran summer camps on the grounds for nearly a decade before that.

== Notable residents ==
- Jim Carrey resided in the village in the late 1970s (around 1979) to early 1980s
- Neil Young resided here for a brief period around the late 1940s to 1951
