= Kasador =

Canadian indie rock/pop band

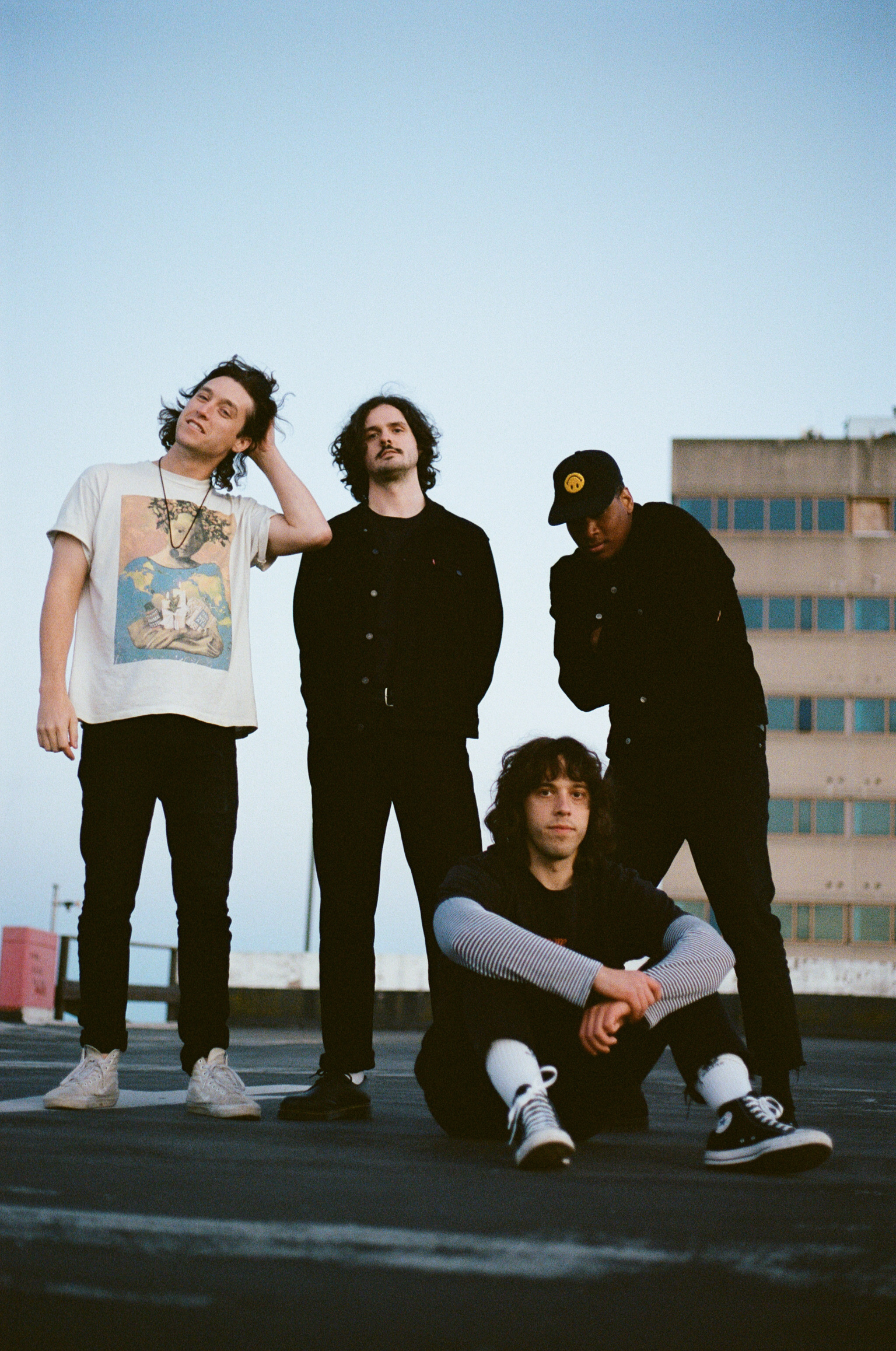
- Kasador in St. Catharines, ON 2024

Background information
- Origin: Kingston, Ontario, Canada
- Genres: Indie Rock
- Years active: 2015–present
- Members: Cam Wyatt; Boris Baker; Stephen Adubofuor; Thomas Draper
- Past members: Don Pineapple; Colin Simonds; Angus Fay; Julien Laferrière; Nick Babcock; Will Hunter; Jonas Lewis-Anthony
- Website: kasadorband.com

Kasador is a Canadian indie rock band originating from Kingston, Ontario. The four-piece band was formed in 2012, and was known as the Will Hunter Band until changing the group's name in early 2015. Members as of January 2024 are Cam Wyatt, Thomas Draper, Boris Baker, and Stephen Adubofuor.

== History ==
Lead vocalist and guitarist Will Hunter started his musical career playing solo acoustic sets in the Kingston area while he was a student at Queen's University. He sought out other musicians and founded the band in 2012 with original drummer and bassist Don Pineapple and Colin Simonds. Fellow Queen's students Boris Baker (bass) and Cam Wyatt (lead guitar) joined what was then known as the Will Hunter Band; other musicians also performed. The group initially performed at venues in and around Queen's University.

In August 2014, they released a five-song EP titled Last Summer, recorded at Bathouse Recording Studio. The band started touring through Southern and Eastern Ontario, and was slotted as the opening act for headliners such as The Stringers.

In 2015, the band announced they were now performing as "Kasador". Lead vocalist Will Hunter said that the change in name was to reflect that this was a band rather than a group of musicians supporting a lead singer. The new band name was chosen because it is a variant of the Spanish word cazador, which means "hunter", and is a nod to the former name of the band.

Shortly after the name change, Nick Babcock joined the band on keyboards. Pineapple left the band in early 2016, and was replaced on drums by Angus Fay. Despite the changes in personnel, Kasador continued to tour as both support and headlining performers in Ontario, Quebec, and the U.S. through 2015 until the summer of 2016. The band then returned to Bathouse Studio to record an eponymous six-song EP, which was produced by Nyles Spencer.

The Kasador EP was released in September 2016. Alan Cross included "Neighbourhood", in his "Top 11" playlist for the week of September 16, 2016; the song had been released as a single with accompanying video in January 2016. A second video accompanied the release of "Talk About It". The band donated the proceeds from one month's downloads of the song "Never Alone", as well as a portion of ticket sales, to jack.org, a chapter-based organization providing mental health support to students. The release was supported by tours in Canada and the U.S.

On January 1, 2017, The Strombo Show presented a four-hour special edition celebrating the 30th anniversary of The Tragically Hip's first release. Kasador was one of the groups selected to cover a Tragically Hip song, performing "So Hard Done By" on the program, which was broadcast nationally on CBC Radio 2. George Strombolopoulos, the host of the show, noted the familial relationship between The Tragically Hip and Kasador: Boris Baker is the son of Hip lead guitarist Rob Baker, and Angus Fay is the nephew of Hip drummer Johnny Fay.

In the spring of 2017, the band saw another change in their line-up, with Angus Fay leaving and Julien Laferrière taking over the drums. Following a year of touring in Canada and the U.S. supporting their EP, the band released two new songs in October 2017. "Come Get Yer Money", which is a reflection on the political frustration observed by the band, was released in tandem with the announcement of their fall 2017 tour of Ontario and the northeast U.S. "Skeleton Park" was selected as "Song of the Day" by Toronto-based Live in Limbo. In a review of Kasador's live performance at Mills Hardware, Soundzine described ''Skeleton Park" as "beautifully haunting".

There were further personnel changes in 2018, with Stephen Adubofuor assuming responsibility for the drums, and Nick Babcock leaving the group. In early 2019, the band announced that it had completed its first full-length album, Brood & Bloom, scheduled for release in the fall of 2019. The plan was for the album to include the two songs released in October 2017; it is produced by Graham Walsh, Rob Baker and Gord Sinclair.

Kasador toured to promote Brood & Bloom in late 2019 and early 2020. Will Hunter informed the band that he would stop performing at the end of the tour, although he would support the band behind the scenes. Their planned North American tour was cut short by the COVID-19 pandemic in March 2020, and Hunter left shortly thereafter. Wyatt, Baker and Adubofuor continued to write and rehearse together through the pandemic. In March 2021, Jonas Lewis-Anthony joined them in writing; Lewis-Anthony is the lead singer of Kingston indie band The Wilderness. In July 2021, the group returned to the recording studio with Lewis-Anthony, and he was invited to become a full member. Kasador announced the change in personnel in September 2021. By January 2023, Lewis-Anthony was no longer part of the band, but would continue to perform with them occasionally. As of 2024, the band consists of Wyatt, Baker, Adubofuor and guitarist Thomas Draper.

=== Brood & Bloom ===
On October 4, 2019, Kasador released their first full album, entitled Brood & Bloom. The 12-track album was recorded during 2017 and 2018 at Bathouse Recording Studio, during which time the band's composition underwent several changes, with Babcock and Laferrière leaving the band, and new drummer Adubofuor joining. The band also went from five to four members. The album tracks include performances by both Laferrière and Babcock, including a track (Pinched Nerve) where Babcock sings lead vocals. Lead vocals were shared between Will Hunter and Cameron Wyatt. The writing credits for all songs are attributed to "Kasador" rather than to individuals. Production was by Graham Walsh (who also played keyboards on five songs), Rob Baker and Gordon Sinclair; Nyles Spencer also produced three songs, and engineered the album.

The title single was released prior to the album, and reached #27 on the Canadian alternative radio chart and #37 on the Canadian rock radio chart. According to the Kingston Herald, this meant "Kasador [was] the only independent band in the top 40 at the time."

A Journal of Musical Things published an extensive review of the album, saying, "This album has substance. It has weight. And it's incredible." The review went on to discuss each track in the album, and stated that the band "is standing firmly on the edge of something massive".

==== Track listing ====
No.	Title	Length
1.	"Brood & Bloom"	3:31
2.	"Come Get Yer Money"	3:20
3.	"High Rise"	3:19
4.	"Waiting"	3:08
5.	"Guns Love & Money"	4:15
6.	"Vacant Sign"	0:55
7.	"Givin' it Up"	3:17
8.	"Again for Me"	2:33
9.	"Pinched Nerve"	3:46
10.	"I Believe Terribly"	3:03
11.	"Could've Loved You"	3:48
12.	"Undone"	3:31

=== Youth ===
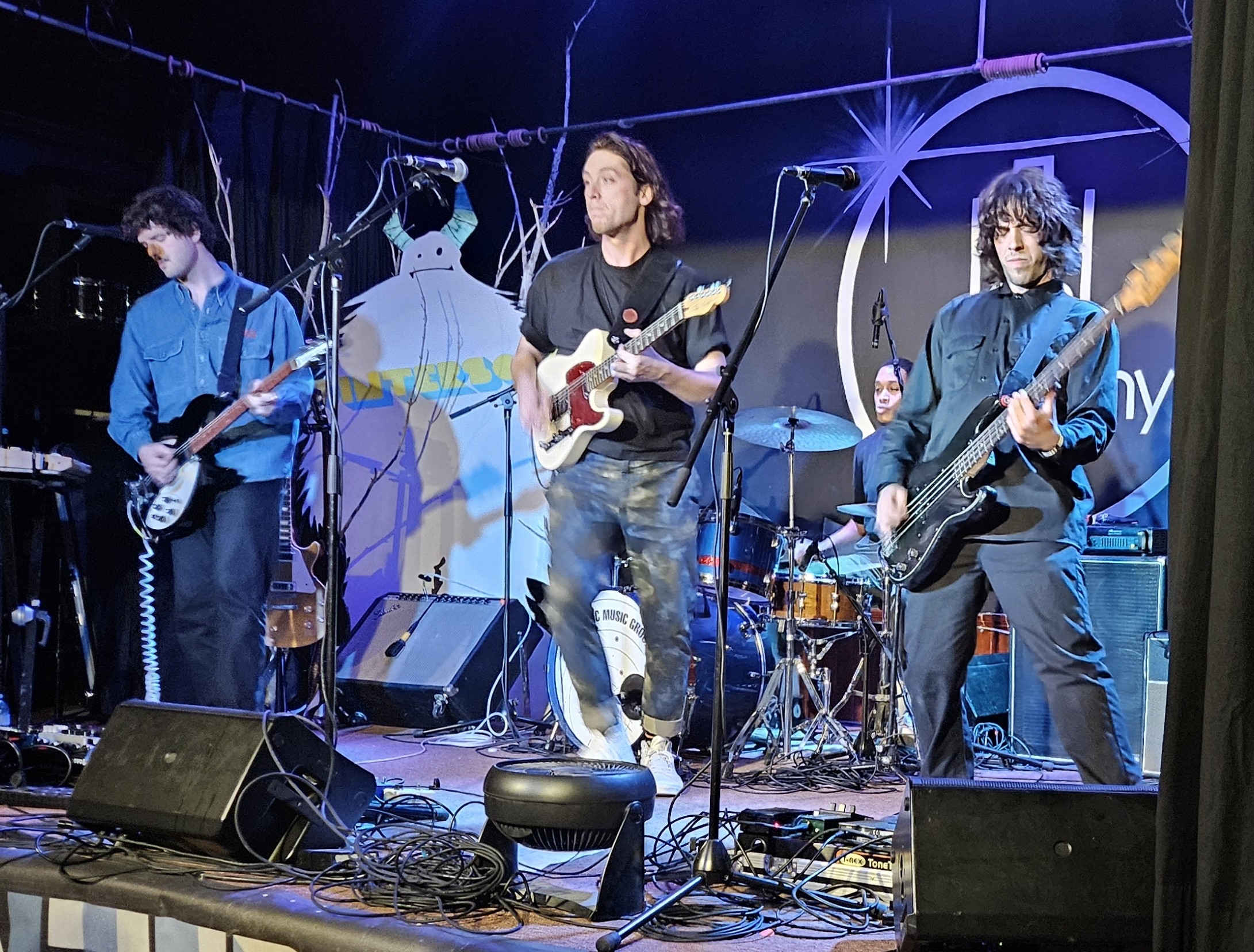
Live performance of Kasador at Winterfest, January 2025

In January 2023, Kasador announced the coming release of their new EP, Youth. The songs were developed from writing sessions that took place during the early part of the COVID-19 pandemic. They began to work with Brett Emmons, fellow Kingston musician and lead singer of The Glorious Sons. The first single, also named Youth, was released in January 2023, and the full EP was released later in 2023.

=== Kasador I ===
Kasador released their self-titled EP on April 4, 2025. The EP was favourably reviewed by Amber Healy in A Journal of Musical Things. Healy specifically pointed to the song "Butterflies" as one that had undergone considerable development since it was initially incorporated into the band's live sets in 2021; Wyatt's voice was more powerful thanks to vocal coaching, and the instrumentation reflected the creative influences of new member Draper.
