= Uxbridge, Ontario =

Uxbridge
- Township (lower-tier)
- Township of Uxbridge
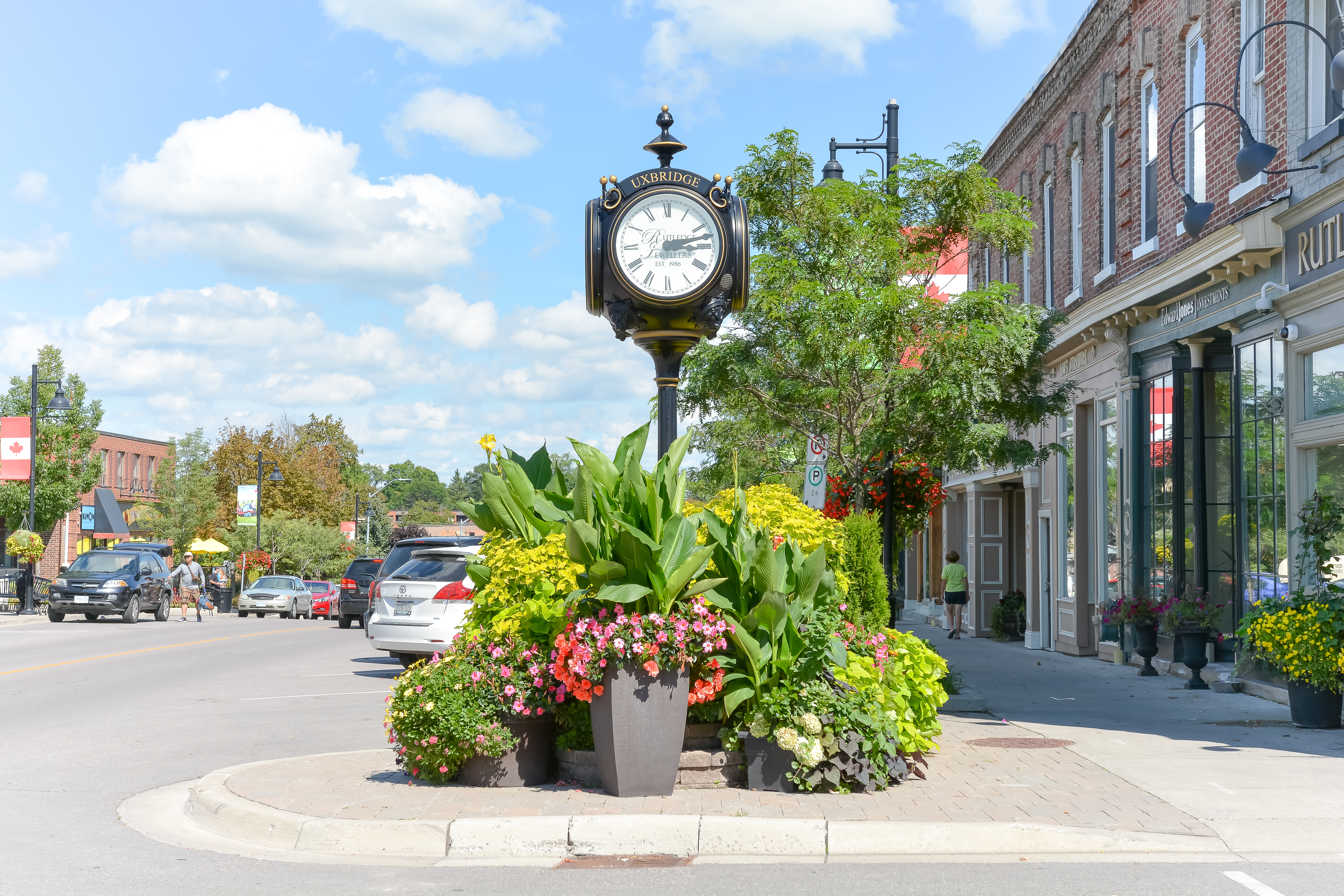
- Brock Street in Downtown Uxbridge

- Coat of arms

- Location within Regional Municipality of Durham Location within Southern Ontario
- Coordinates: 44°07′N 79°08′W
- Country: Canada
- Province: Ontario
- Region: Durham Region
- Established: 1850 (under York County in 1850 and new Ontario County in 1852) and 1974 (under Durham Region)

Government
  - Mayor: Dave Barton
  - Regional Councillor: Bruce Garrod
  - Councillors: List: Pamela Beach; Gary Ruona; Bruce Garrod; Willie Popp; Todd Snooks
  - Governing body: Uxbridge Township Council

Area
  - Land: 420.52 km^{2} (162.36 sq mi)
  - Urban: 15.46 km^{2} (5.97 sq mi)
- Elevation: 273 m (896 ft)

Population (2021)
  - Total: 21,556
  - Density: 51.3/km^{2} (133/sq mi)
  - Urban: 11,794
  - Urban density: 762.7/km^{2} (1,975/sq mi)
- Time zone: UTC−5 (Eastern (EST))
  - Summer (DST): UTC−4 (Eastern (EDT))
- Forward sortation area: L9P
- Website: www.town.uxbridge.on.ca

Uxbridge is a township in the Regional Municipality of Durham in south-central Ontario, Canada.

Uxbridge is twinned with Catawissa, Pennsylvania, in the United States, from which many of its settlers originated.

== Communities ==
The main centre in the township is the namesake community of Uxbridge. Other settlements within the township include the following:

- Uxbridge Township (former, 1850–1974): Altona, Coppin's Corners, Forsythe Glenn, Glasgow, Glen Major, Goodwood, Quaker Village, Roseville, Siloam
- Scott Township (former, 1850–1974): Leaskdale, Sandford, Udora, Zephyr

== History ==
It was named for Uxbridge, England, a name which was derived from "Wixan's Bridge".

The first settlers in the area were Quakers who started arriving in 1806 from the Catawissa area of Pennsylvania. The community's oldest building, the Uxbridge Friends Meeting House, was built in 1820 and overlooks the town from Quaker Hill, a kilometre to the west.

The township was incorporated as a municipality under York County in 1850 and became part of the newly formed Ontario County two years later.

The first passenger-carrying narrow-gauge railway in North America, the Toronto and Nipissing Railway arrived in Uxbridge in June 1871, and for over a decade Uxbridge was the headquarters of the railway. In 1872, the Village of Uxbridge was separated from the Township and incorporated as a separate entity.

With the creation of the Regional Municipality of Durham in 1974, Uxbridge Township was amalgamated with the Town of Uxbridge and Scott Township to create an expanded Township of Uxbridge.

=== Contemporary history ===
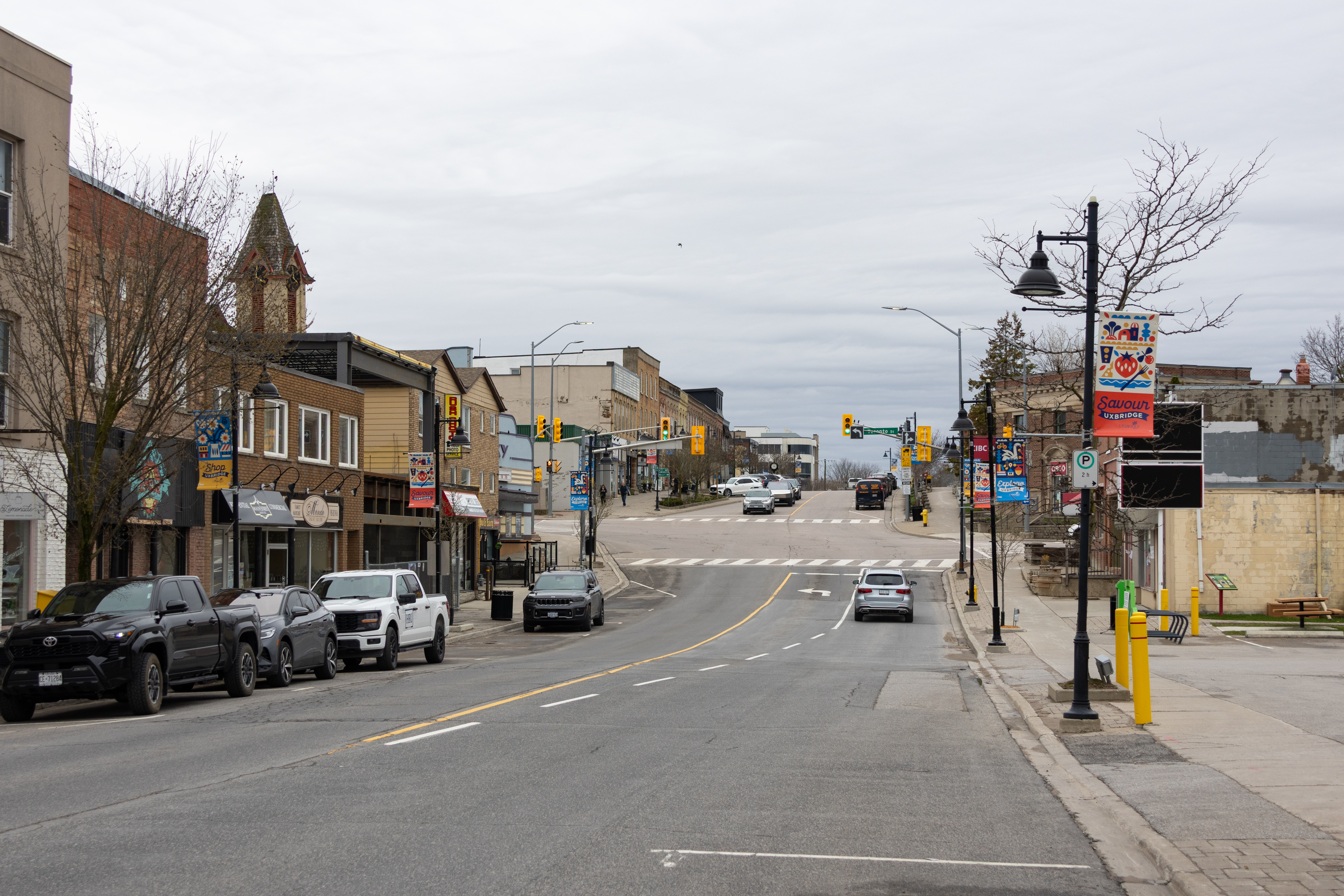
Brock Street, downtown Uxbridge

Today, Uxbridge is as a mostly suburban community in northern Durham Region. Major manufacturing employers include Pine Valley Packaging (packaging, containers and portable shelters), Koch-Glitsch Canada (mass transfer systems) and Hela Canada (spice and ingredient manufacture). Uxbridge area is also home to many small industrial businesses such as the movie theatre 'The Roxy' as well as many restaurants, cultivation farms and beekeeping organizations. Many residents commute to other centres in Durham and York Regions and beyond.

The 30-bed Uxbridge Cottage Hospital opened in 1958 is a site associated with the Markham Stouffville Hospital Corporation. A new ward of the hospital was added in 2022.

== Demographics ==
In the 2021 Census of Population conducted by Statistics Canada, Uxbridge had a population of 21,556 living in 8,008 of its 8,310 total private dwellings, a change of 1.8% from its 2016 population of 21,176. With a land area of 420.52 km^{2} (162.36 sq mi), it had a population density of 51.3/km^{2} (132.8/sq mi) in 2021.

Historical census populations – Uxbridge, Ontario

Year	Pop.	±%
1976	10,977	—
1981	11,207	+2.1%
1986	11,895	+6.1%
1991	14,092	+18.5%
1996	15,882	+12.7%

Year	Pop.	±%
2001	17,377	+9.4%
2006	19,169	+10.3%
2011	20,623	+7.6%
2016	21,176	+2.7%
2021	21,556	+1.8%

Source: Statistics Canada

=== Ethnicity ===
Panethnic groups in the Township of Uxbridge (2001−2021)
Panethnic group	2021		2016		2011		2006		2001	
Panethnic group	Pop.	%	Pop.	%	Pop.	%	Pop.	%	Pop.	%
European (Note: Statistic includes all persons that did not make up part of a visible minority or an indigenous identity.)	19,340	90.33%	19,390	92.44%	19,405	95.03%	18,515	97.06%	16,655	96.44%
East Asian (Note: Statistic includes total responses of "Chinese", "Korean", and "Japanese" under visible minority section on census.)	555	2.59%	305	1.45%	175	0.86%	140	0.73%	225	1.3%
Indigenous	345	1.61%	375	1.79%	230	1.13%	120	0.63%	115	0.67%
South Asian	335	1.56%	170	0.81%	120	0.59%	110	0.58%	25	0.14%
African	220	1.03%	255	1.22%	250	1.22%	75	0.39%	80	0.46%
Southeast Asian (Note: Statistic includes total responses of "Filipino" and "Southeast Asian" under visible minority section on census.)	220	1.03%	115	0.55%	95	0.47%	20	0.1%	45	0.26%
Middle Eastern (Note: Statistic includes total responses of "West Asian" and "Arab" under visible minority section on census.)	110	0.51%	130	0.62%	0	0%	20	0.1%	80	0.46%
Latin American	75	0.35%	95	0.45%	80	0.39%	40	0.21%	45	0.26%
Other/multiracial (Note: Statistic includes total responses of "Visible minority, n.i.e." and "Multiple visible minorities" under visible minority section on census.)	215	1%	160	0.76%	35	0.17%	40	0.21%	20	0.12%
Total responses	21,410	99.32%	20,975	99.05%	20,420	99.02%	19,075	99.51%	17,270	99.38%
Total population	21,556	100%	21,176	100%	20,623	100%	19,169	100%	17,377	100%
Note: Totals greater than 100% due to multiple origin responses

=== Language ===
As of the 2021 census, English is the mother tongue of 88.9% of the population, whereas French, the other official language, of 0.9%. Non-official languages are spoken by 8.7%, of which German is the mother tongue of 1.1% of the residents of Uxbridge, and native speakers of Italian make up 1.0% of the population.

== Attractions ==
In 2009 Uxbridge Township received federal designation by Industry Canada as the "Trail Capital of Canada", resulting from the over 220 kilometres of managed trails on over 3,200 hectares (8,000 acres) of protected greenspace within its borders. Uxbridge trails run through and alongside historic villages, mixed forests, meadows, ponds, streams, and wetlands. A number of major trail systems run through the Township, including the Oak Ridges Trail and the Trans-Canada Trail.

The Uxbridge Historical Centre (formerly Uxbridge-Scott Museum and Archives) possesses a number of artifacts, mostly related to the township's agricultural heritage and of the town's Quaker heritage. The museum also includes ten heritage buildings as well as heritage herb and flower gardens. It offers seasonal events, workshops, and specialty programs. It was formed in 1972 by the Uxbridge-Scott Historical Society, who holds an annual Heritage Day festival to supports the museum.

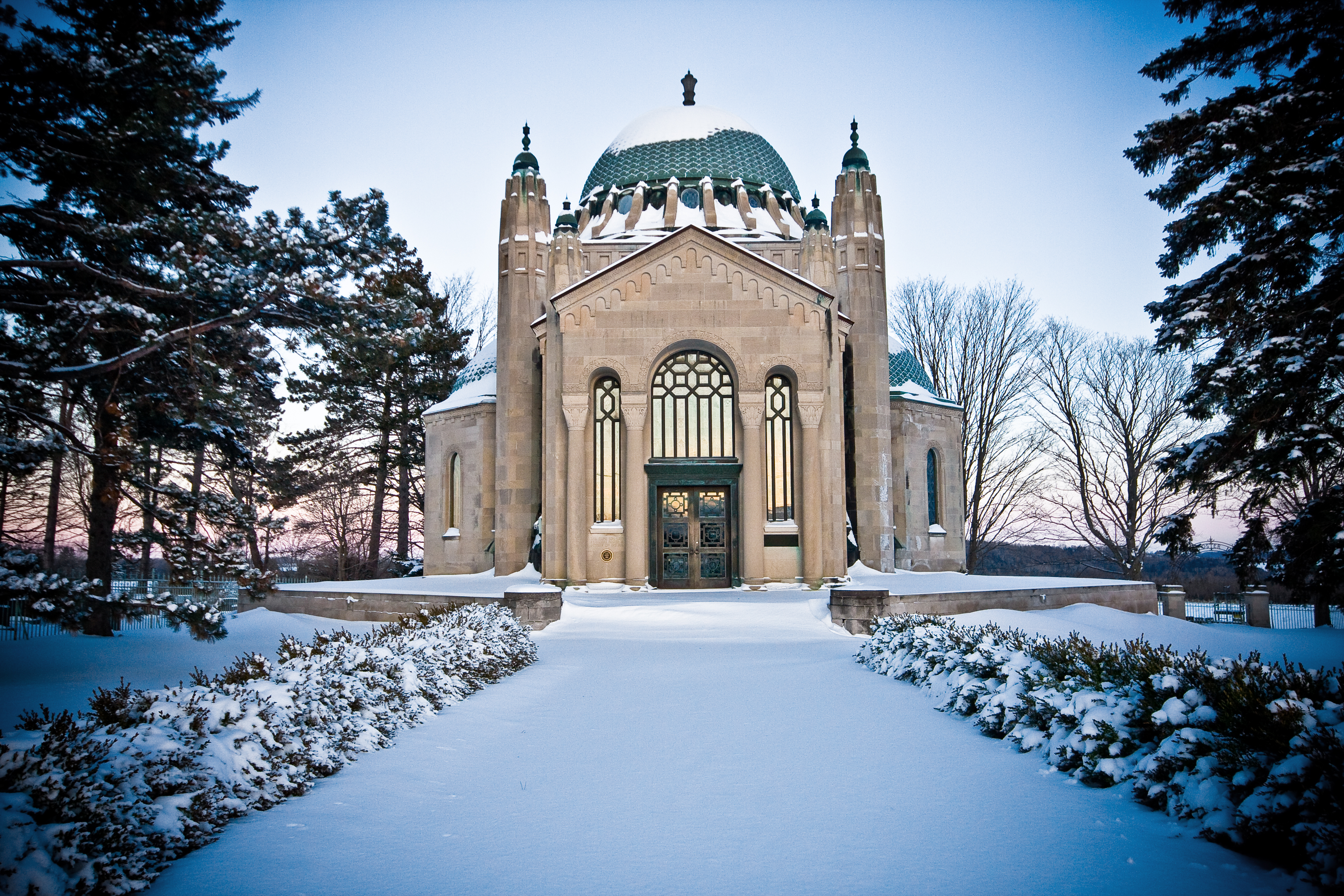
Thomas Foster Memorial

There are also a number of attractions related to the history of the area. Uxbridge's Elgin Park, named after Lord Elgin, was the site of a picnic held by 19th century Prime Minister John A. Macdonald in a re-election bid. In addition, the Thomas Foster Memorial Temple, erected in 1935–36 by the former mayor of Toronto, is situated a short distance north of town. Inspired by Foster's visit to India, the Temple was designed by architects J. H. Craig (1889–1954) and H. H. Madrill (1889–1998). Finally, the former home of famed author Lucy Maud Montgomery of Anne of Green Gables fame is situated in Leaskdale. Montgomery lived in the area from 1911 to 1926, and wrote half of her books at what is now the site of the Leaskdale Manse Museum.

Since 1995, the Lions Club has hosted Art in the Park, held the second week in August. Also known as Summerfest, this juried art show attracts artists from across the province.

On July 1, 2024, the Ontario government opened the Uxbridge Urban Provincial Park in the Township of Uxbridge. The park is the province's first urban provincial park. The park was first announced in the 2023 provincial budget, and the proposed urban park may include up to 532 hectares (1,315 acres) of provincially-owned lands. Instead of a single connected block, the park is made up of individual parcels of lands within the Uxbridge area. And while they are not all currently connected, it is possible they might be linked by other lands, recreational areas, and trail systems in the future.

=== Uxbridge Arena and Recreation Centre ===
The Uxbridge Arena and Community Centre contains two ice pads and was built in 1978, with a second pad constructed in 1997. During the winter months, this facility is home to a variety of hockey and skating clubs and programs. During the summer it is used for lacrosse and pickleball. Over the years more recreation facilities have been added to the area surrounding the arena. The area now features the Uxbridge Lawn Bowling Club, The Bonner Boys Splash Pad, tennis courts and a baseball diamond.

The arena is home to North Durham Minor Hockey and the Uxbridge Bruins.

=== Ski Resorts ===
Skiing in Uxbridge area began in 1938 by the Toronto Ski Club when it rented 160 hectares (400 acres) of the Pugh family farm until 1948 and then operated by the Pughs until it was abandoned.

Today there are two ski resorts, all located within a short distance of one another:

- Dagmar Ski Resort – largest of the three resorts; established by the Toronto Ski Club
- Lakeridge Ski Resort – located north of Dagmar; opened in 1989 following Toronto Ski Club acquisition of part of the former Pugh family farm in 1983

=== Uxbridge Fall Fair ===
The Uxbridge Fall Fair has been held annually since 1886. Attractions include home craft, vegetable and flower exhibits, cattle, goat, sheep, poultry and rabbit shows, the midway, tractor pull, demolition derby, heavy horse pull and barnyard rodeo.

=== Other attractions ===
The Uxbridge Studio Tour and Sale is also held in September, giving visitors an opportunity to meet with local artists in their studios and explore the creative process.

Since 1988, Uxbridge has hosted an annual Heritage Christmas Craft Show, held the second Saturday in November. A Santa Claus Parade is also held annually in late November.

Since 2018, Uxbridge has been the home of Springtide Music Festival, a non-profit music festival. The festival runs annually on the second weekend of June. In 2026, the festival lineup included artists like Dan Mangan, Kasador, and Yukon Blonde.

Since 2008 there has been an annual Uxbridge Ribfest, usually during a middle weekend of July. It was run by the town branch of the Royal Canadian Legion (Branch 170) But since 2015, has been organized by the Bonner Boys, a local community group.

The Township of Uxbridge owns the former Uxbridge railway station, and makes it available for community functions. It was last used by the York Durham Heritage Railway until it ceased operations in 2024.

Throughout the year, a number of theatrical and musical productions are held at the Music Hall. Movies are shown at a local unique movie theatre, named The Roxy.

The Highlands of Durham Games are held in Elgin Park near the end of July. These games focus on Celtic traditions and offer a variety of entertainments.

From December 4 to January 2 the Uxbridge Optimists host the Fantasy of Lights, a drive-through light show through Elgin Park featuring a variety of different displays.

== Public transit ==
GO Transit operates regional buses to Uxbridge from Mount Joy GO Station, or Old Elm GO Station during rush hours.In 2001, there was a proposal to extend GO Transit train service on its Stouffville line to Uxbridge (As part of MoveOntario 2020 plan) The expansion is currently unfunded, and could cost as much as $350 million.

Durham Region Transit also runs buses in Uxbridge. DRT route 905 connects Uxbridge to Port Perry and Whitby. DRT route 605 circulates within Uxbridge.

== Local government ==
Interactive map of Uxbridge electoral wards

The Township of Uxbridge has five wards, each represented by an elected council member. As of 2022, the mayor is Dave Barton and the Regional Councillor is Bruce Garrod.

=== Coat of arms ===
Coat of arms of Uxbridge, Ontario
Notes Granted 15 February 2001 Crest Out of a mural crown Or, a demi lion Gules holding in the paws a cogwheel proper; Escutcheon Or issuant from two flaunches Vert, each charged with a garb of rye Or, a fess enarched raguly counter raguly Vert charged with a maple leaf Or, in chief an ox's head caboshed Gules armed Or and in base barry wavy Azure and Argent; Motto 'On't Uxbridge'

The motto is an abbreviation of “On to it Uxbridge,” meaning “Let’s go Uxbridge.” It refers to Ontario through the abbreviation “Ont.,” while being a rallying call for the township and its residents to move forward into the future with confidence.

== Education ==
=== Public elementary schools ===
- Joseph Gould Public School
- Quaker Village Public School
- Scott Central Public School
- Uxbridge Public School
- Goodwood Public School

=== Separate elementary schools ===
- St. Joseph's Catholic School

=== Independent schools ===
- Uxbridge Montessori School

=== High schools ===
- Uxbridge Secondary School

=== Colleges ===
- Durham College (North Campus Uxbridge on 2 Campbell Drive, an office building next to Uxbridge Cottage Hospital) plus Ontario Employment Services Centre on Brock Street.

== Media ==
Uxbridge has two community newspapers: the Standard and the Cosmos. Uxbridge is also served by a monthly community zine and events guide, UFOREA, which is an acronym for "Uxbridge For Everyone Always".

== Notable people ==
- Tyson Beukeboom, Rugby Canada player, lock Rugby Canada
- Ted Barris, author and CBC Radio host
- Mary J. L. Black, librarian and suffragist
- Chris Begg, pitched for Canada's baseball team at the 2004 and 2008 Olympic games
- Christopher Chapman, film writer, director, editor and cinematographer
- Hayden Christensen, actor
- Leah Daniels, country singer/songwriter
- Jeff Keeping, former professional Canadian football defensive tackle and offensive lineman for the Toronto Argonauts of the Canadian Football League
- Bryan Marchment, former NHL player with nine different teams, now a scout for the San Jose Sharks
- Mason Marchment, NHL player with the Columbus Blue Jackets
- Robyn Ottolini, country singer and songwriter
- Jessica Phoenix, equestrian, competed in the 2012 London Summer Olympics
- Dan Pollard, broadcaster for NHL network and CBC Radio, and commentator for the Peterborough Petes
- Gary Roberts, former NHL player with the Calgary Flames and the Toronto Maple Leafs
- Jim Zoet, professional basketball player

=== Historical figures ===
- Joseph Gould, farmer, businessman and political figure in Ontario (member of the Legislative Council of the Province of Canada 1854-1861 and Warden of Ontario County.
- Isaac James Gould, son of Joseph Gould, Ontario MPP and federal MP.
- Lucy Maud Montgomery, Canadian author, best known for a series of novels beginning with Anne of Green Gables, published in 1908, lived in Uxbridge from around 1911 to 1926.
- Laura Secord, Canadian hero during the War of 1812, was granted 172 acres (0.70 km^{2}) of land in Uxbridge but never resided there.

== In film ==
- The 1972 film The House Without a Christmas Tree starring Jason Robards was filmed in Uxbridge at Peel and Victoria. The house and school are located here. The 2nd film in the series, entitled The Thanksgiving Treasure, also used the same house.
- The 1975 film Sudden Fury used the old gas station/store in Siloam for a major segment of filming.
- The show 'The Littlest Hobo' (a show about a lone dog's travails) was one of the first shows to use Uxbridge for on location shooting in the 1980s.
- The CBC's series Road to Avonlea was shot on location at an exterior village set located in Uxbridge.
- The 1995 TV series Once Upon a Hamster (65 episodes) broadcast on Canada's YTV and UK's Channel 4 was filmed on location in Uxbridge.
- The 1996 film Christmas in My Hometown, starring Tim Matheson and Melissa Gilbert, was partially filmed in Uxbridge.
- The 1996 film The Long Kiss Goodnight starring Geena Davis and Samuel L. Jackson was partially filmed in Uxbridge.
- The 1996 film The Stupids starring Tom Arnold was partially filmed in Uxbridge.
- The 1998 film Jerry and Tom starring Joe Mantegna and Sam Rockwell was partially filmed in Uxbridge.
- The 1999 film A Map of the World starring Sigourney Weaver and Julianne Moore was partially filmed in Uxbridge.
- The 2001 film Driven starring Sylvester Stallone and Burt Reynolds was partially filmed in Uxbridge.
- The 2001 film Serendipity starring John Cusack, Kate Beckinsale, and Jeremy Piven was partially filmed in Uxbridge.
- The 2001 film Prancer Returns starring John Corbett, Stacy Edwards, Michael O'Keefe, Jack Palance, and Gavin Fink was partially filmed in Uxbridge.
- The 2002 film Undercover Brother starring Eddie Griffin, Denise Richards, and Dave Chappelle was partially filmed in Uxbridge.
- The 2002 film Men With Brooms with Paul Gross, Leslie Nielsen, and Connor Price was partially filmed in Uxbridge
- The 2004 film The Prince & Me starring Julia Stiles was partially filmed in Uxbridge.
- The 2005 film A History of Violence starring Viggo Mortensen was partially filmed in Uxbridge.
- The 2006 film Cow Belles starring Aly Michalka, AJ Michalka was filmed in Uxbridge.
- The 2007 film Lars and the Real Girl starring Ryan Gosling was partially filmed in Uxbridge.
- The 2009 film Grey Gardens starring Drew Barrymore and Jessica Lange was partially filmed in Uxbridge.
- The 2015 TV series Schitt's Creek was filmed on location in Goodwood.
- The 2021 film Awake, starring Gina Rodriguez was partially filmed in Uxbridge.

== See also ==
- List of townships in Ontario
