= Urban parks in Canada =

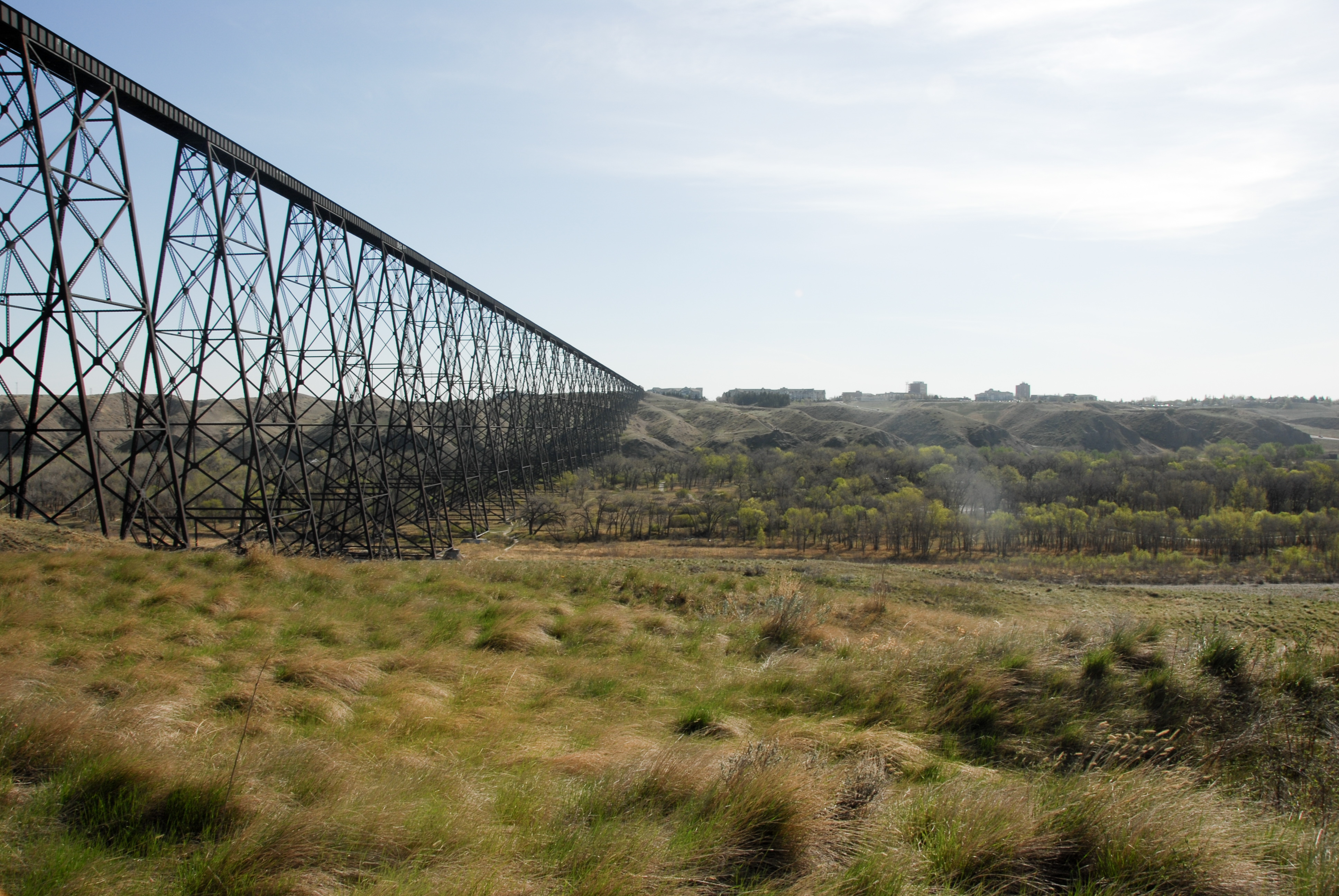
Indian Battle Park, a municipal park in Lethbridge, with the Lethbridge Viaduct visible in the left-background

Urban parks in Canada are areas that offer recreation and green spaces to residents of a municipality. An urban park is often owned or maintained by a municipal government. However, several parks and green spaces may also be maintained or owned by a conservation authority (such as the conservation authorities of Ontario), regional government, provincial government, or the federal government. Canada's national parks system, managed by Parks Canada, includes one urban park, although the agency has plans to create additional national urban parks.

The amenities offered at these urban parks vary substantially, with some parks encompassing athletic facilities, community gardens and urban farms, dog parks, hiking trails, playgrounds, and public washrooms. Some urban parks in Canada may be actively maintained and appear as neatly tended gardens or greenspaces. However, many of the country's largest urban parks are completely undeveloped open spaces.

== Parks in British Columbia ==
=== Kelowna ===
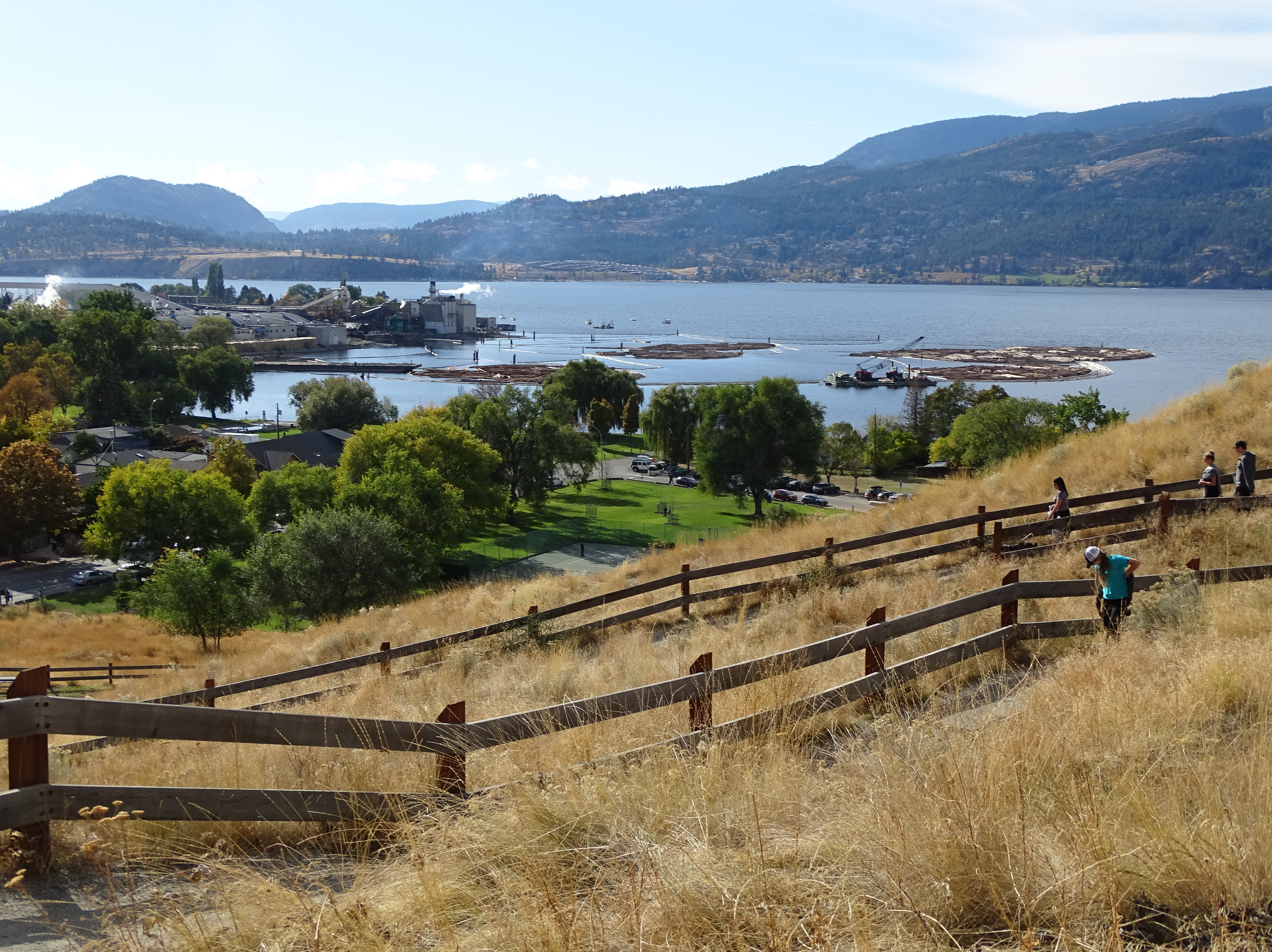
Knox Mountain Park, a nature park in Kelowna.

In 2022, there was 1,268 hectares (3,130 acres) of parkland in Kelowna, comprising 6 per cent of the city's total area. About 75 per cent of the total parkland is made up of natural area, with 25 per cent of Kelowna's parkland being actively managed. In 2021, 11 per cent of the city's total parkland was considered environmentally significant. There is approximately 8.8 hectares (22 acres) of municipal parkland for every 1,000 people living in Kelowna. In 2021, the city's capital park expenditure was over $13.1 million. In addition to municipal parkland, the city also contains a 974 hectares (2,410 acres) parkland that is maintained by a conservation authority, the provincial government, or the federal government.

There are 200 beaches and parks in Kelowna. There are 13 dog parks, 10 community gardens and urban farms, 80 playgrounds, and 23 public washrooms in Kelowna's parklands.

=== Greater Victoria ===
==== Saanich ====
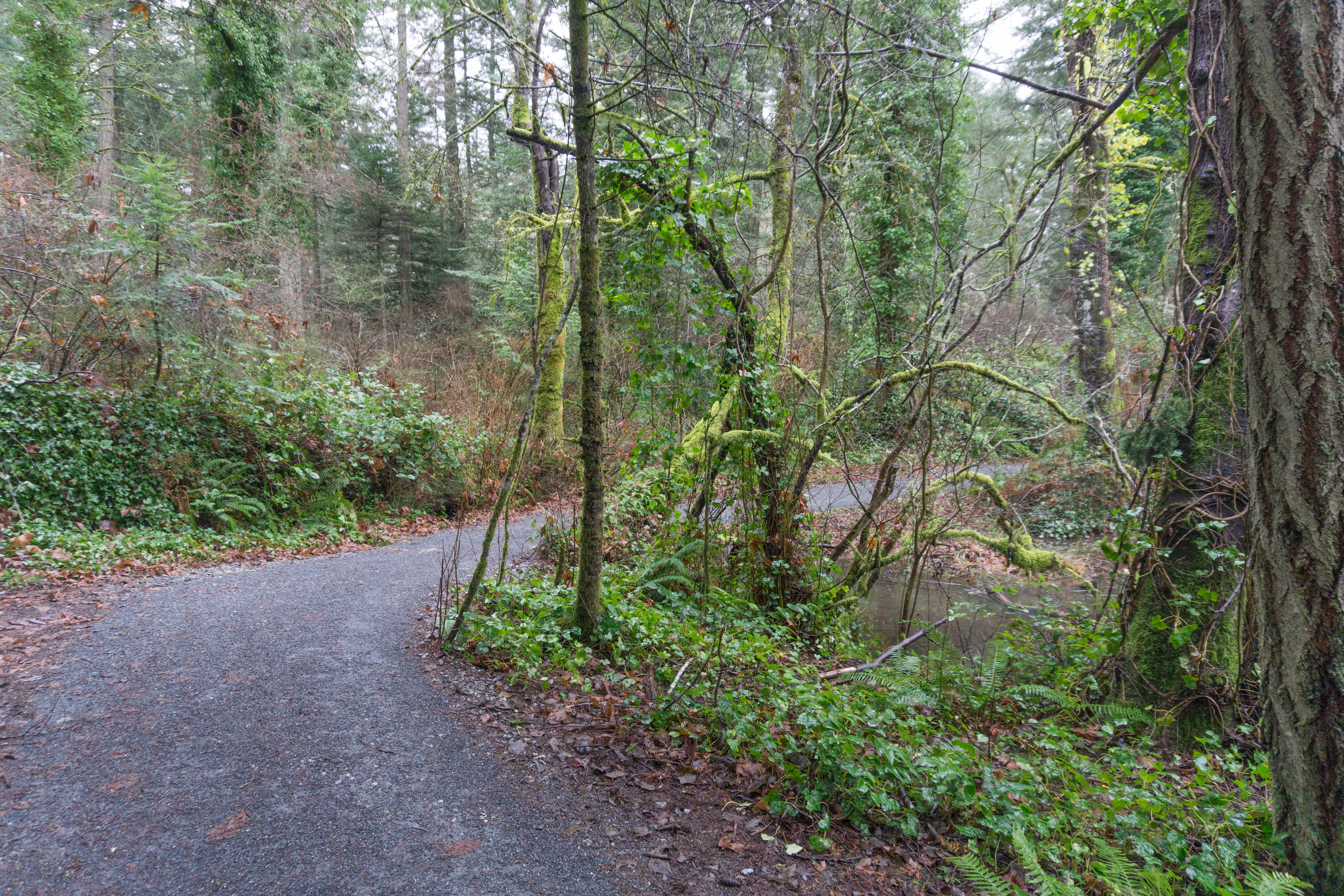
A trail at Elk/Beaver Lake Regional Park in Saanich

In 2022, there was 867 hectares (2,140 acres) of parkland in Saanich, comprising 8 per cent of the district's total area. About 65 per cent of the total parkland is made up of natural area, with 35 per cent of Saanich parkland being actively managed. There is approximately 7.4 hectares (18 acres) of municipal parkland for every 1,000 people living in Victoria. In 2021, the district's capital park expenditure was over $2.9 million. In addition to municipal parkland, the district also contains 906 hectares (2,240 acres) parkland that is maintained by a conservation authority, the provincial government, or the federal government.

There are more than 170 beaches and parks in Kelowna. There are 165 dog parks, 5 community gardens and urban farms, 56 playgrounds, and 16 public washrooms in Kelowna's parklands. (Note: Nearly all parks in Saanich have provisions permitting "off-leash" dogs.)

==== Victoria ====
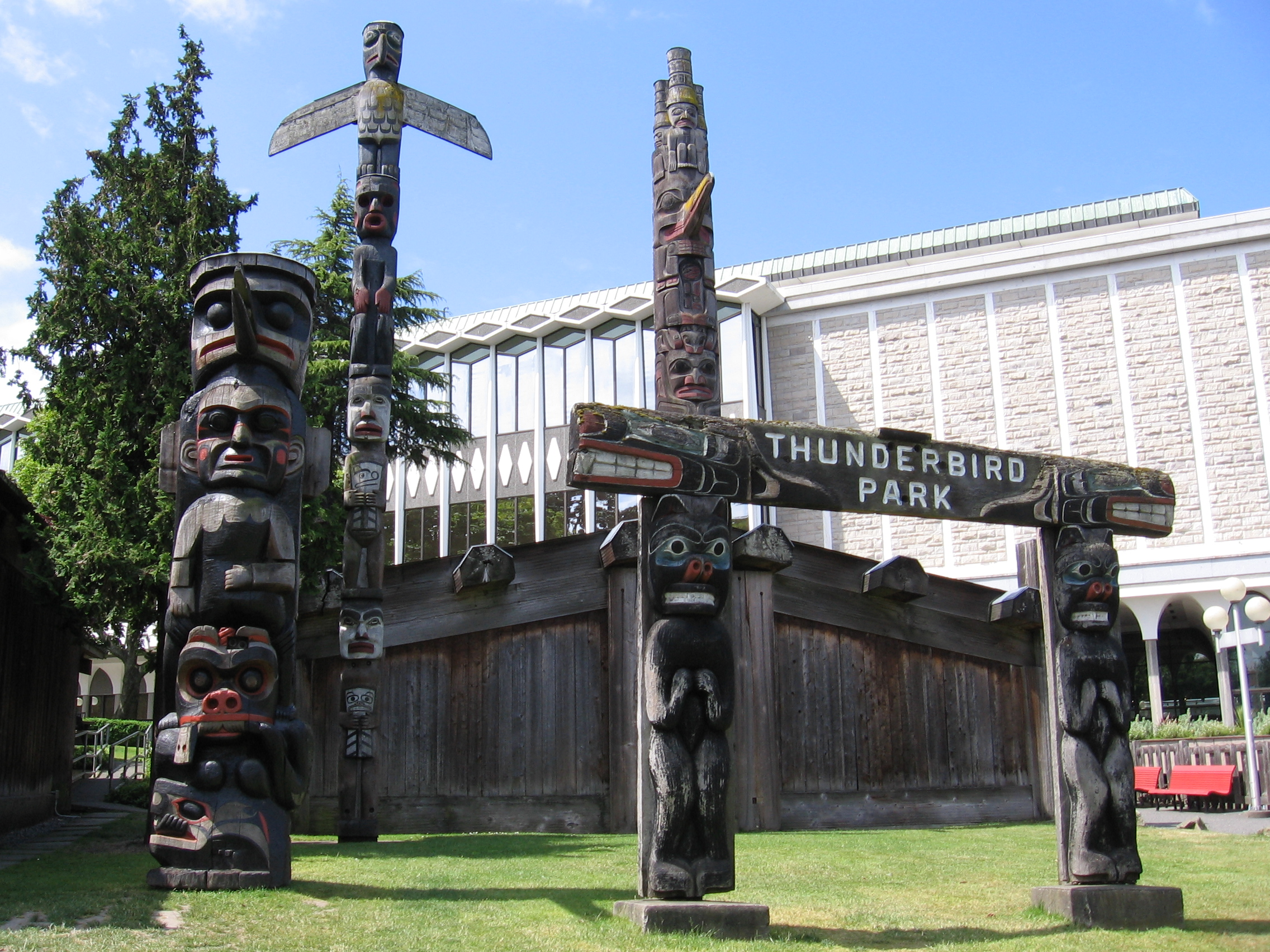
Totem poles at Thunderbird Park in Victoria.

In 2021, there was 254 hectares (630 acres) of parkland in Victoria, comprising 13 per cent of the city's total area. Approximately 36 per cent of the total parkland is made up of natural area. About 36 per cent of Victoria's parkland is considered environmentally significant. There is approximately 2.7 hectares (6.7 acres) of municipal parkland for every 1,000 people living in Victoria. In 2020, the city's capital park expenditure was over $5.7 million.

There are 138 beaches and parks in Victoria. There are 13 dog parks as well as 14 community gardens and urban farms.

=== Metro Vancouver ===
==== Langley (township) ====
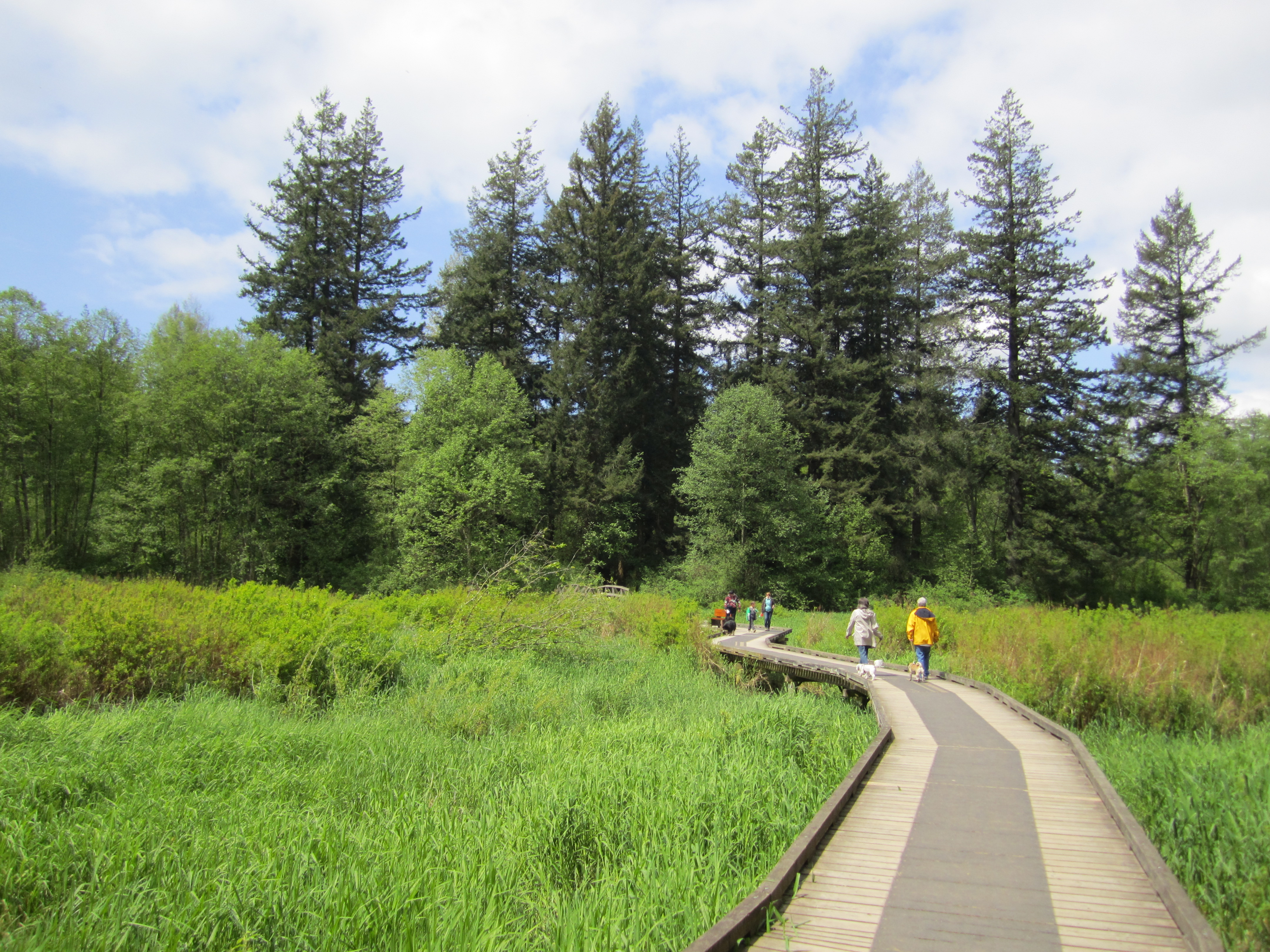
A footbridge at Campbell Valley Regional Park in the Township of Langley

In 2022, there was 811 hectares (2,000 acres) of parkland in the Township of Langley, comprising 3 per cent of the township's total area. About 16 per cent of the total parkland is made up of natural area, with 74 per cent of Langley's parkland being actively managed. There is approximately 6.1 hectares (15 acres) of municipal parkland for every 1,000 people living in Langley. In 2021, the township's capital park expenditure was over $4.4 million. In addition to municipal parkland, the township also contains 1,223 hectares (3,020 acres) parkland that is maintained by a conservation authority, the provincial government, or the federal government.

There are 6 dog parks, 9 community gardens and urban farms, 84 playgrounds, and 43 public washrooms in Langley parklands.

==== North Vancouver ====
In 2022, there was 131 hectares (320 acres) of parkland in North Vancouver, comprising 11 per cent of the city's total area. About 66 per cent of the total parkland is made up of natural area, with 34 per cent of North Vancouver parkland being actively managed. There is approximately 2.3 hectares (5.7 acres) of municipal parkland for every 1,000 people living in North Vancouver. In 2021, the city's capital park expenditure was over $1 million. In addition to municipal parkland, the city also contains 17 hectares (42 acres) parkland that is maintained by a conservation authority, the provincial government, or the federal government.

There are 6 dog parks, 12 community gardens and urban farms, 18 playgrounds, and 8 public washrooms in North Vancouver's parklands.

==== Richmond ====
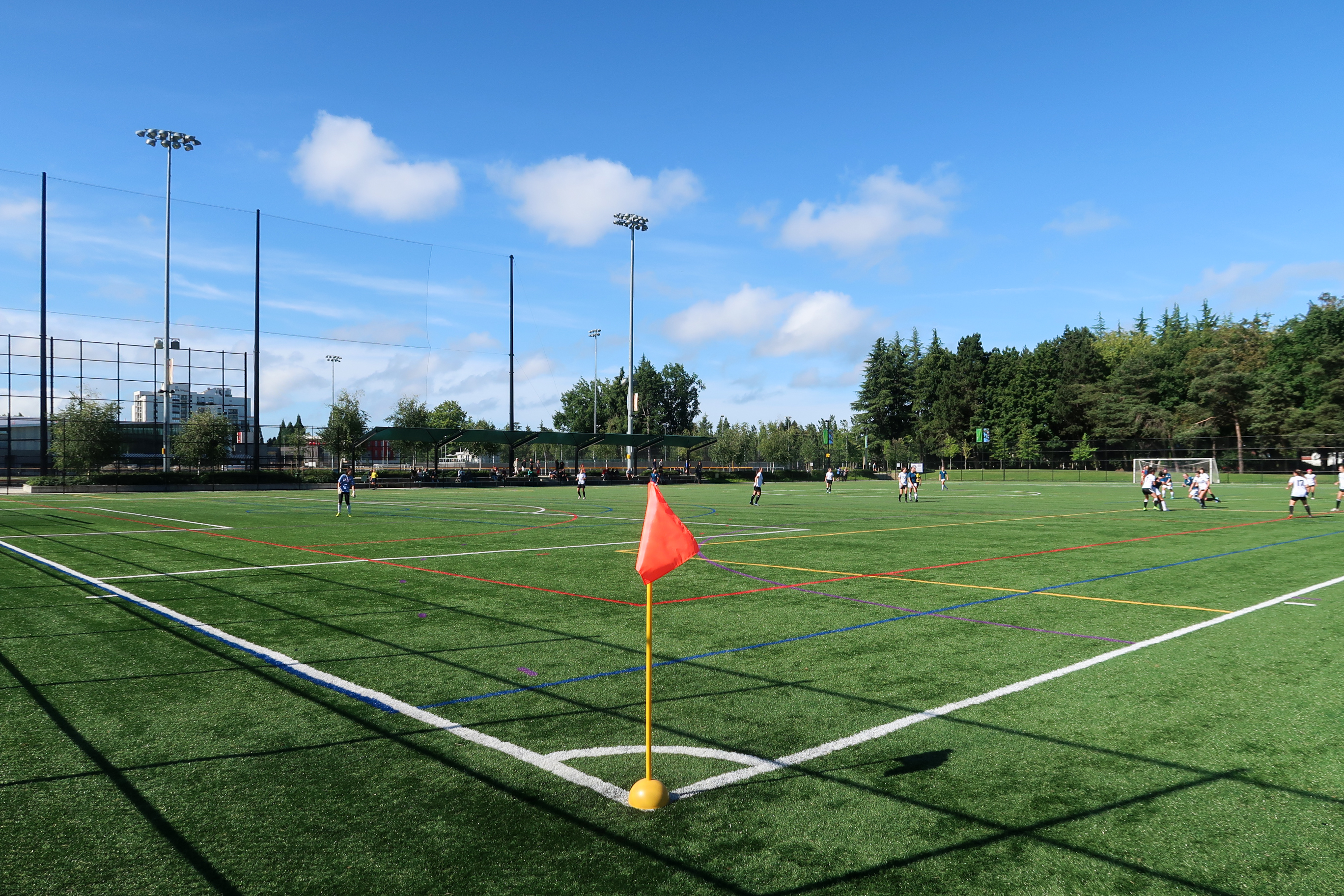
An athletics field at Minoru Park in Richmond

In 2022, there was 1,004 hectares (2,480 acres) of parkland in Richmond, comprising 8 per cent of the city's total area. About 37 per cent of the total parkland is made up of natural area, with 63 per cent of Richmond parkland being actively managed. There is approximately 4.8 hectares (12 acres) of municipal parkland for every 1,000 people living in Richmond. In 2021, the city's capital park expenditure was over $2.9 million. In addition to municipal parkland, the city also contains 83 hectares (210 acres) parkland that is maintained by a conservation authority, the provincial government, or the federal government.

There are 140 parks in Richmond. There are 14 dog parks, 12 community gardens and urban farms, 76 playgrounds, and 40 public washrooms in Richmond's parklands. (Note: Includes playgrounds on school district's property.)

==== Surrey ====
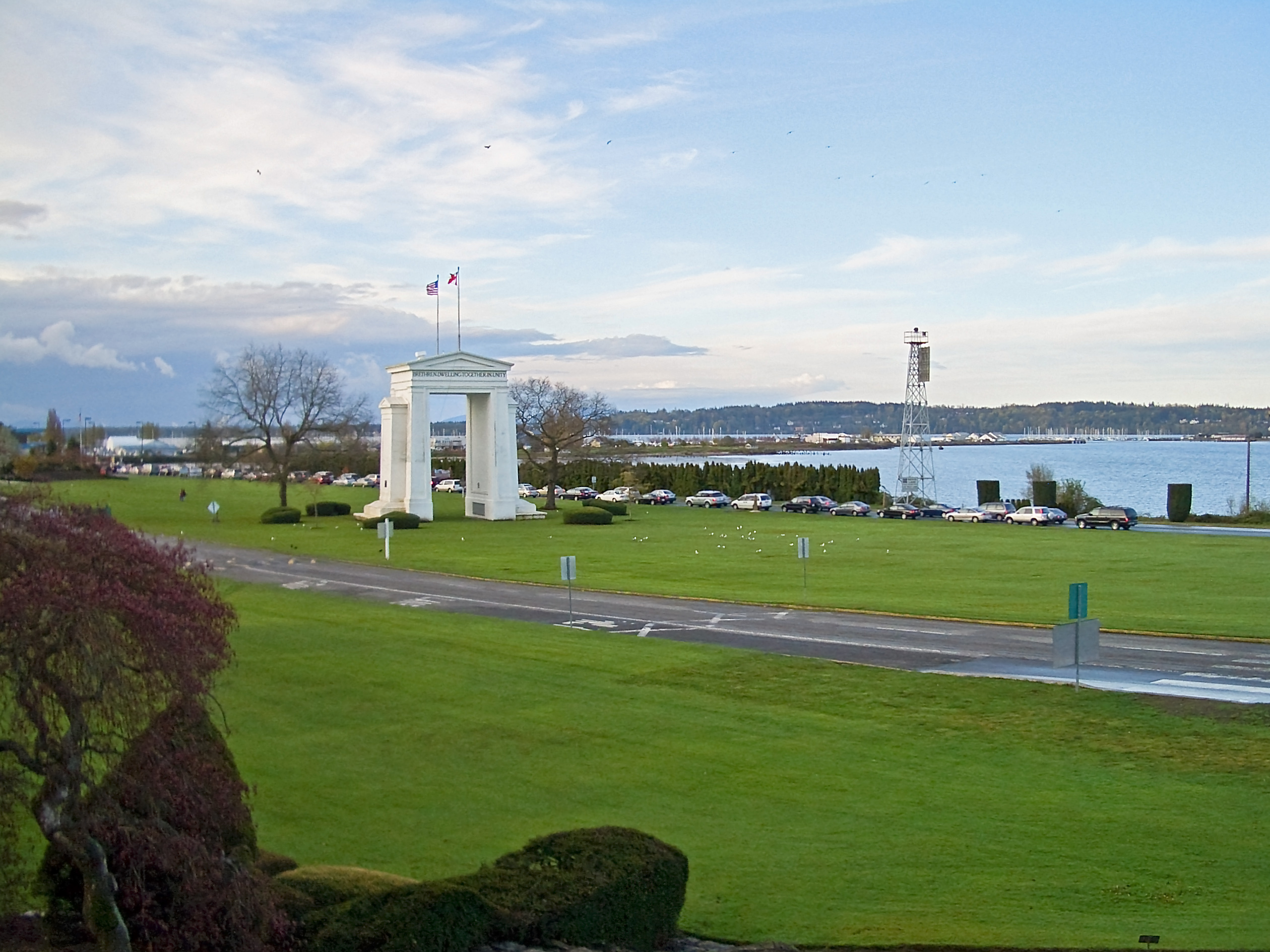
Peace Arch Provincial Park in Surrey, which forms part of Peace Arch Park, an international park that straddles the Canada–United States border

In 2022, there was 2,939 hectares (7,260 acres) of parkland in Surrey, comprising 9 per cent of the city's total area. About 41 per cent of the total parkland is made up of natural area, with 59 per cent of Surrey parkland being actively managed. There is approximately 5.2 hectares (13 acres) of municipal parkland for every 1,000 people living in Surrey. In 2021, the city's capital park expenditure was over $16.6 million. In addition to municipal parkland, the city also contains 571 hectares (1,410 acres) parkland that is maintained by a conservation authority, the provincial government, or the federal government.

There are more than 800 parks in Surrey, containing more than 650 kilometres (400 mi) of trails. There are 17 dog parks, 10 community gardens and urban farms, 187 playgrounds, and 93 public washrooms in Surrey's parklands.

==== Vancouver ====
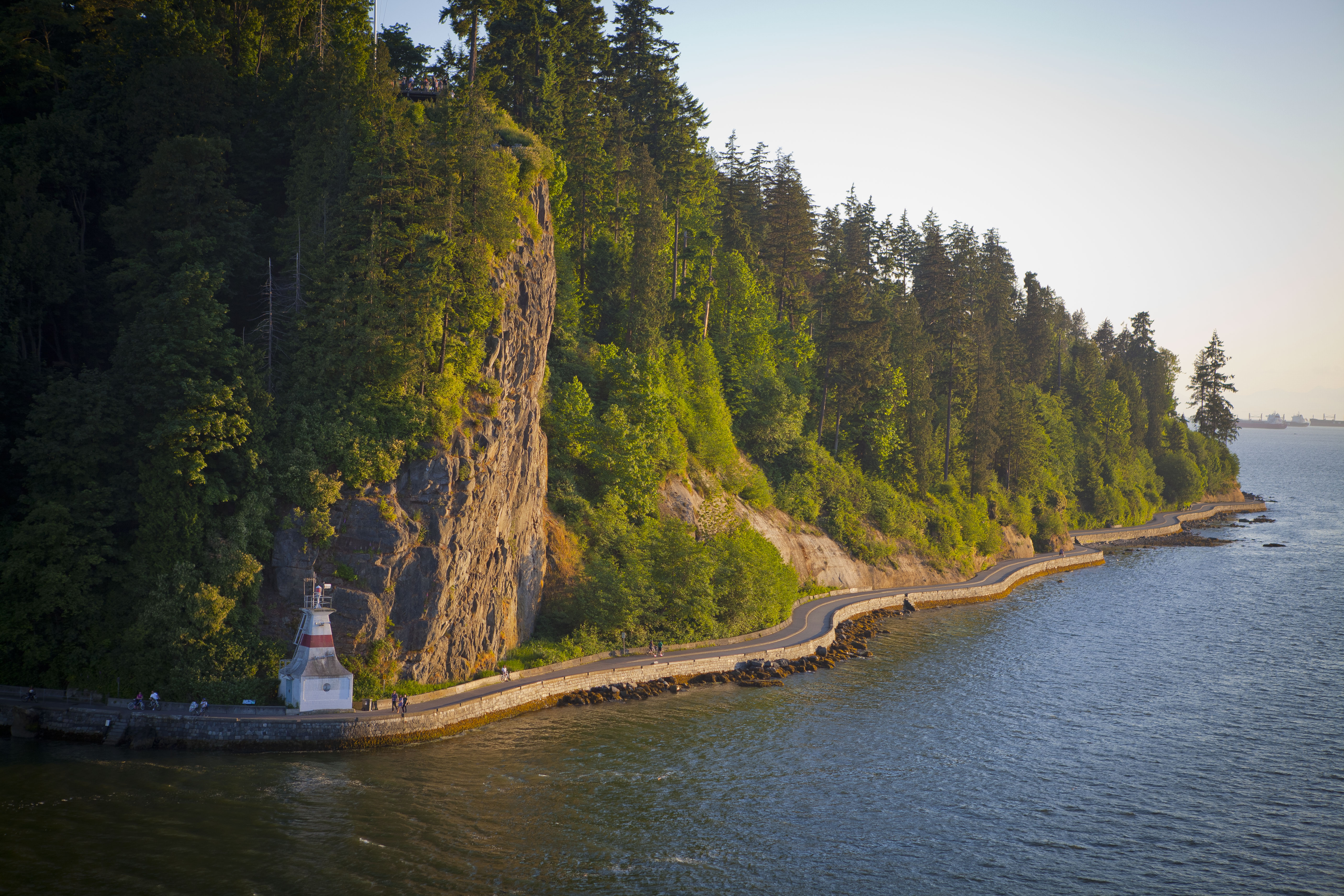
Stanley Park and the Vancouver Seawall.

In 2022, there was 1,164 hectares (2,880 acres) of parkland in Vancouver, comprising 10 per cent of the city's total area. About 47 per cent of the total parkland is made up of natural area, with 50 per cent of Vancouver's parkland being actively managed. There is approximately 1.8 hectares (4.4 acres) of municipal parkland for every 1,000 people living in Vancouver.

The Vancouver Park Board maintains nearly 300 parks in the city, whose capital parks expenditure was $70.4 million in 2021. There are 44 dog parks, 41 community gardens and urban farms, 159 playgrounds, and 97 public washrooms in Vancouver's parklands.

== Parks in the Maritimes ==
=== Charlottetown ===
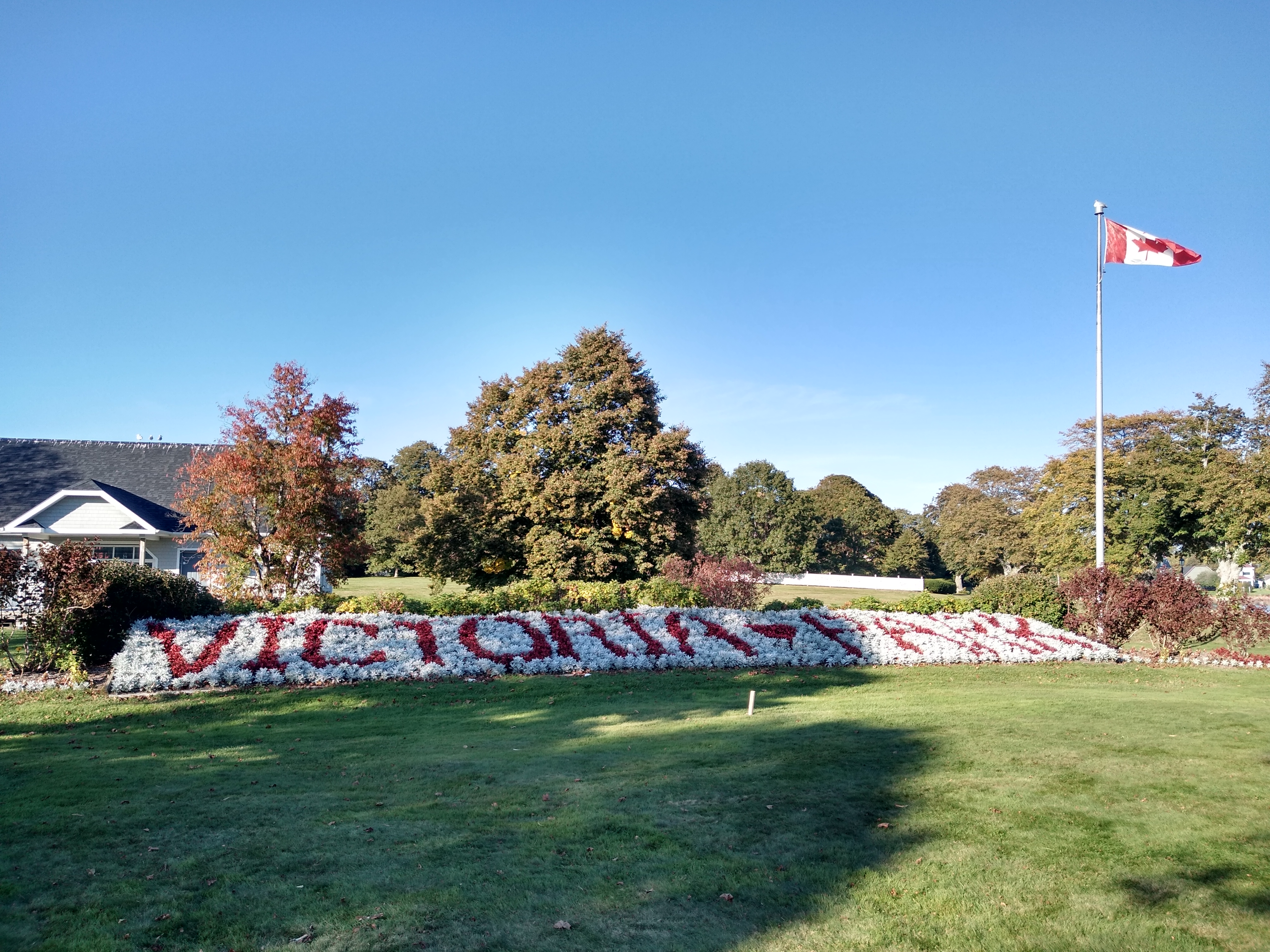
A flowerbed at Victoria Park in Charlottetown

In 2022, there was 166 hectares (410 acres) of parkland in Charlottetown, comprising 4 per cent of the city's total area is made up of parkland. About 33 per cent of the total parkland is made up of natural area, with 55 per cent of Charlottetown's parkland being actively managed. There is approximately 4.3 hectares (11 acres) of municipal parkland for every 1,000 people living in Charlottetown. In 2022, the city's capital park expenditure was over $2.1 million. In addition to municipal parkland, the city also contains 102 hectares (250 acres) parkland that is maintained by a conservation authority, the provincial government, or the federal government.

There are 158 parks in Charlottetown. There are 3 dog parks, 6 community gardens and urban farms, 67 playgrounds, and 10 public washrooms in Charlottetown's parklands.

=== Halifax ===
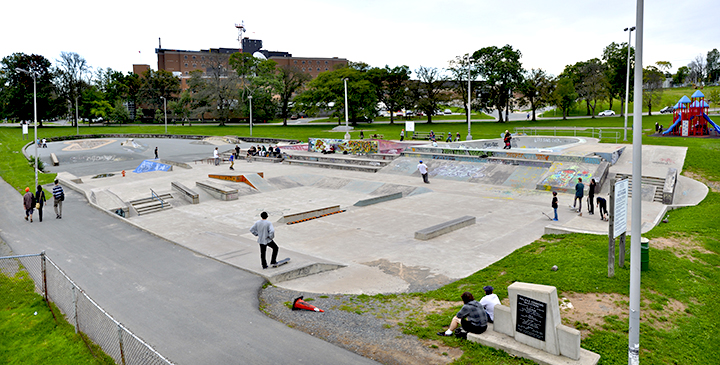
A skatepark situated in Halifax Commons. Opened in 1749, Halifax Commons is Canada's oldest municipal park.

In 2022, there was 5,721 hectares (14,140 acres) of parkland in Halifax, comprising 1 per cent of the city's total area. About 73 per cent of the total parkland is made up of natural area. There is approximately 13 hectares (32 acres) of municipal parkland for every 1,000 people living in Fredericton. In 2021, the city's capital park expenditure was over $10 million.

There are 900 parks in Halifax. This includes the country's oldest urban park, Halifax Commons, a 19 hectares (48 acres) park that was established in 1749 by Governor Edward Cornwallis. There are 39 dog parks, 27 community gardens and urban farms, 407 playgrounds, and 21 public washrooms in Fredericton's parklands.

=== Fredericton ===
In 2022, there was 1,362 hectares (3,370 acres) of parkland in Fredericton, comprising 10 per cent of the city's total area. About 45 per cent of the total parkland is made up of natural area, with 55 per cent of Fredericton's parkland being actively managed. There is approximately 13 hectares (32 acres) of municipal parkland for every 1,000 people living in Fredericton. In 2021, the city's capital park expenditure was over $2.5 million.

There are 138 parkland sites in Fredericton. There are 2 dog parks, 6 community gardens and urban farms, 52 playgrounds, and 5 public washrooms in Fredericton's parklands.

== Parks in Ontario ==
=== Guelph ===
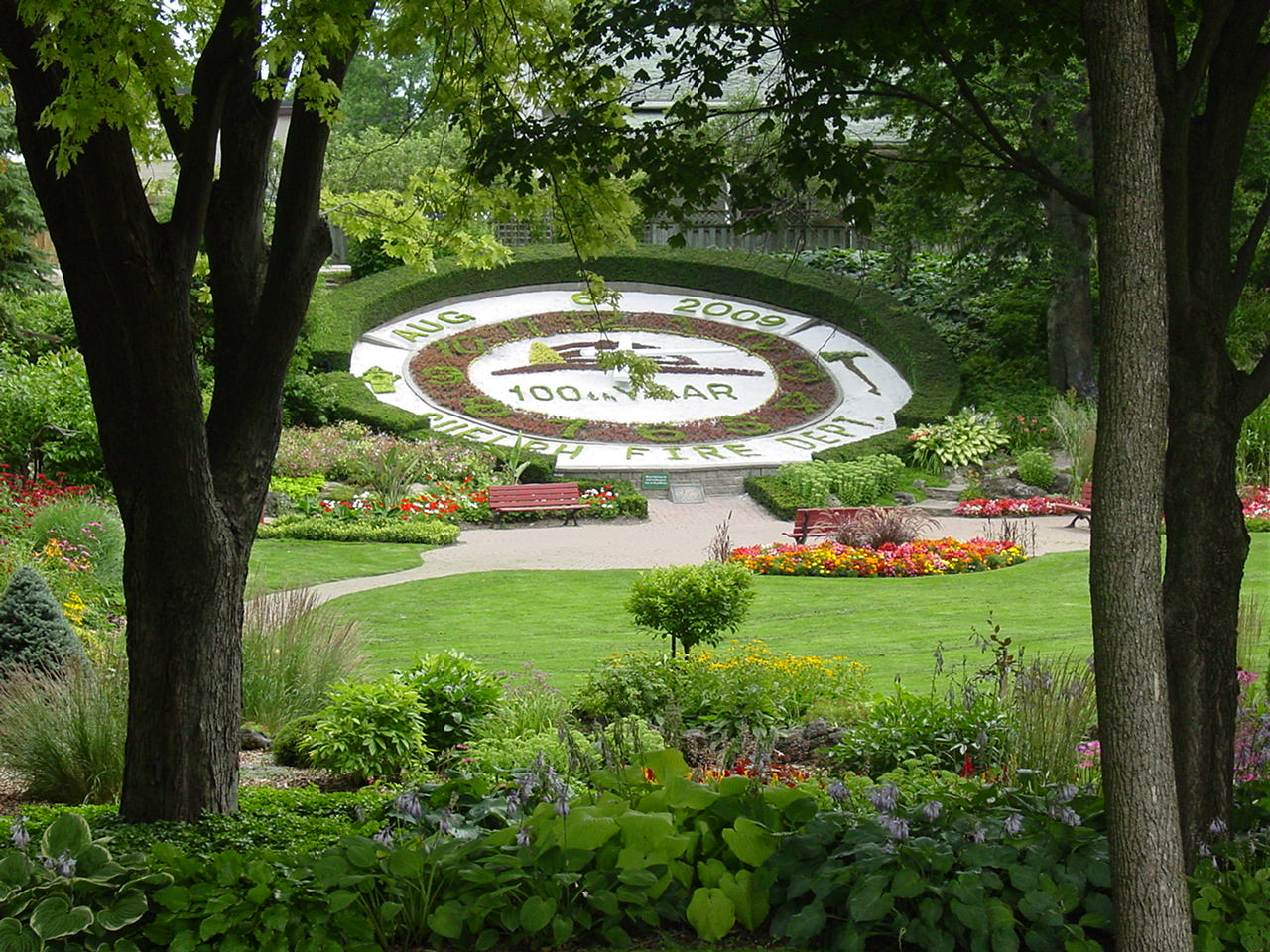
A floral clock bed in Riverside Park in Guelph

In 2022, there was 989 hectares (2,440 acres) of parkland in Guelph, comprising 11 per cent of the city's total area is made up of parkland. About 58 per cent of the total parkland is made up of natural area, with 42 per cent of Guelph's parkland being actively managed. In 2021, 69 per cent of the city's total parkland was considered environmentally significant. There is approximately 6.9 hectares (17 acres) of municipal parkland for every 1,000 people living in Guelph. In 2021, the city's capital park expenditure was over $4.2 million. In addition to municipal parkland, the city also contains 648 hectares (1,600 acres) of parkland that is maintained by a conservation authority, the provincial government, or the federal government.

There are 51 dog parks, 14 community gardens and urban farms, 116 playgrounds, and 13 public washrooms in Guelph's parklands.

=== Hamilton ===
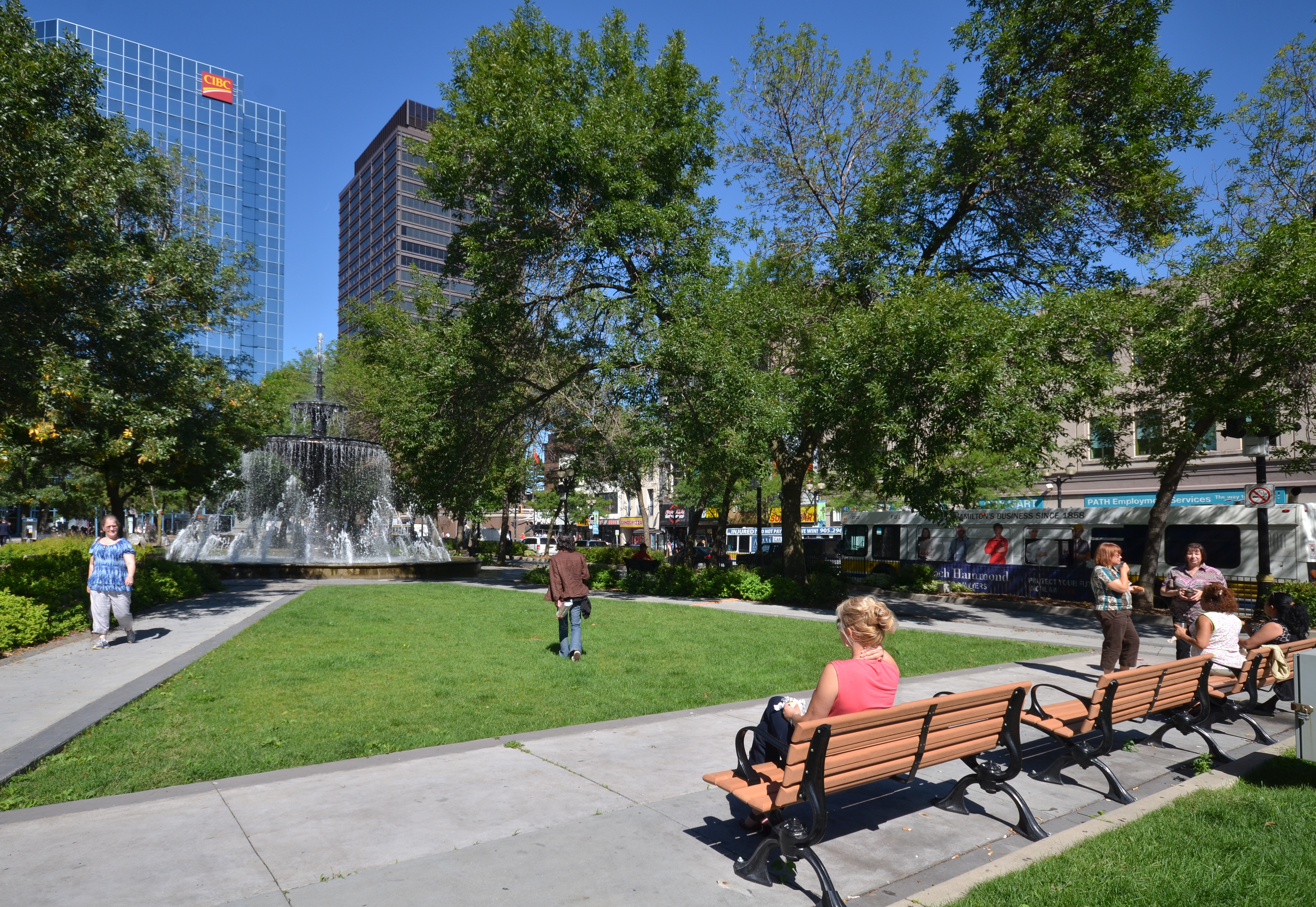
Gore Park is a town square in Hamilton.

In 2022, there was 2,617 hectares (6,470 acres) of parkland in Hamilton, comprising 2 per cent of the city's total area. About 45 per cent of the total parkland is made up of natural area, with 55 per cent of Hamilton's parkland being actively managed. In 2021, 39 per cent of the city's total parkland was considered environmentally significant. There is approximately 4.6 hectares (11 acres) of municipal parkland for every 1,000 people living in Hamilton. In 2021, the city's capital park expenditure was over $7.9 million.

Municipally owned parks in Hamilton are located at 394 locations, as well as 50 shared parks with local school boards. There are 12 dog parks, 65 community gardens and urban farms, 288 playgrounds, and 77 public washrooms in Hamilton's parklands.

=== Ottawa ===
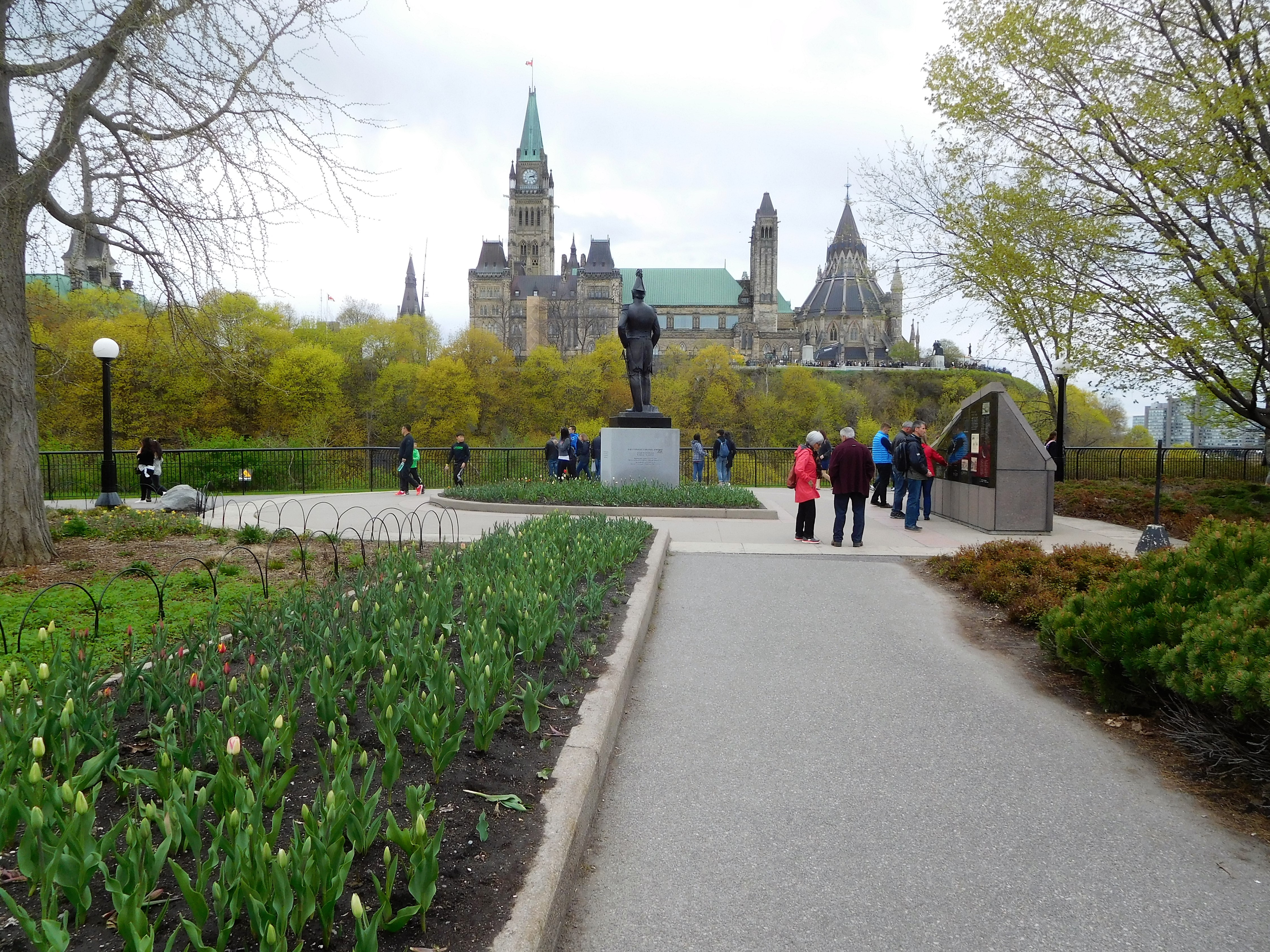
Major's Hill Park in an example of a park in Ottawa maintained by the National Capital Commission instead of the municipal government.

In 2022, Ottawa had 6,210 hectares (15,300 acres) of urban parkland, with approximately 4,489 hectares (11,090 acres) managed by the municipal government, which accounts for about 2 per cent of the city's total area. (Note: Parking lots are included in the total parkland figures for Ottawa.) The remaining parkland is maintained by a conservation authority, the provincial government, or the federal government through institutions like the National Capital Commission. About 34 per cent of the total parkland is made up of natural areas, with 66 per cent of Ottawa's parkland being actively managed. There is approximately 4.4 hectares (11 acres) of municipal parkland for every 1,000 people living in Ottawa. In 2021, the city park capital expenditure was over $9.4 million.

Municipally operated parkland is located at over 1,300 sites, and includes over 2,000 play structure components. There are 236 dog parks, over 148 community gardens and urban farms, and 774 playgrounds contained in Ottawa's parklands.

=== Thunder Bay ===
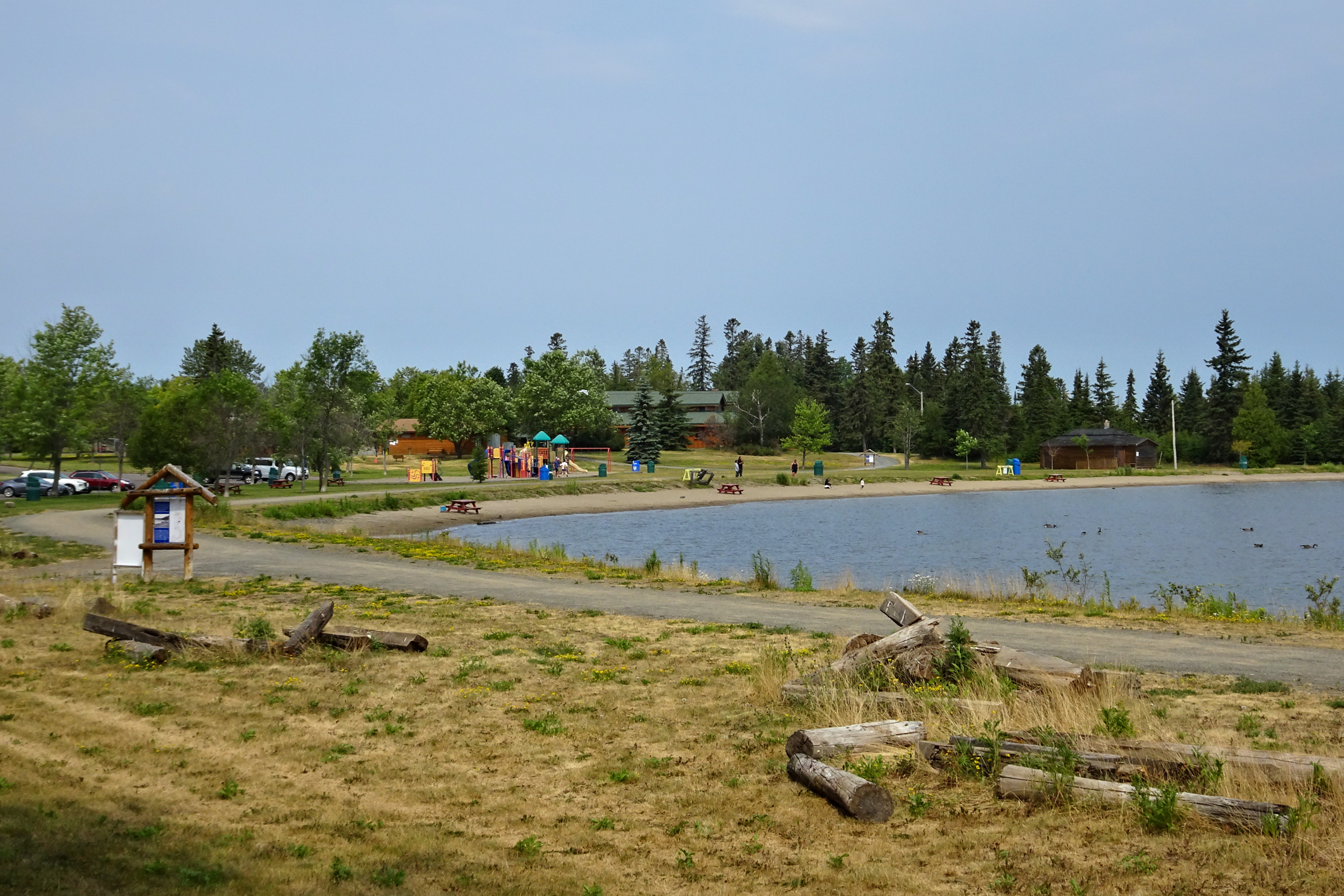
Chippewa Park in Thunder Bay

In 2022, there was 2,070 hectares (5,100 acres) of parkland in Thunder Bay, comprising 6 per cent of the city's total area. About 85 per cent of the total parkland is made up of natural area, with 15 per cent of Thunder Bay's parkland being actively managed. In 2021, 20 per cent of the city's total parkland was considered environmentally significant. There is approximately 19 hectares (47 acres) of municipal parkland for every 1,000 people living in Thunder Bay. In 2021, the city's capital park expenditure was over $4.9 million.

There are 129 parks in Thunder Bay that contain over 55 kilometres (34 mi) of trails. There are 4 dog parks, 10 community gardens and urban farms, 73 playgrounds, and 12 public washrooms in Thunder Bay's parklands.

=== Greater Toronto ===
The Greater Toronto Area is home to Rouge Park, a 7,500-hectare (19,000-acre) national urban park created in 2015 and managed by Parks Canada, an agency of the Government of Canada. Centred around the Rouge River and valley, the urban park is the largest urban park in Canada, and occupies parts of Toronto Markham, Pickering and Uxbridge. (Note: Rouge National Urban Park is the largest urban park in Canada. The North Saskatchewan River Valley park system is the largest single expanse of urban parkland in Canada, although it is a park system made up of multiple urban parks. Gatineau Park is the largest piece of parkland situated within a metropolitan area, although it is not classified as an urban park by the park's managing authority.)

==== Brampton ====
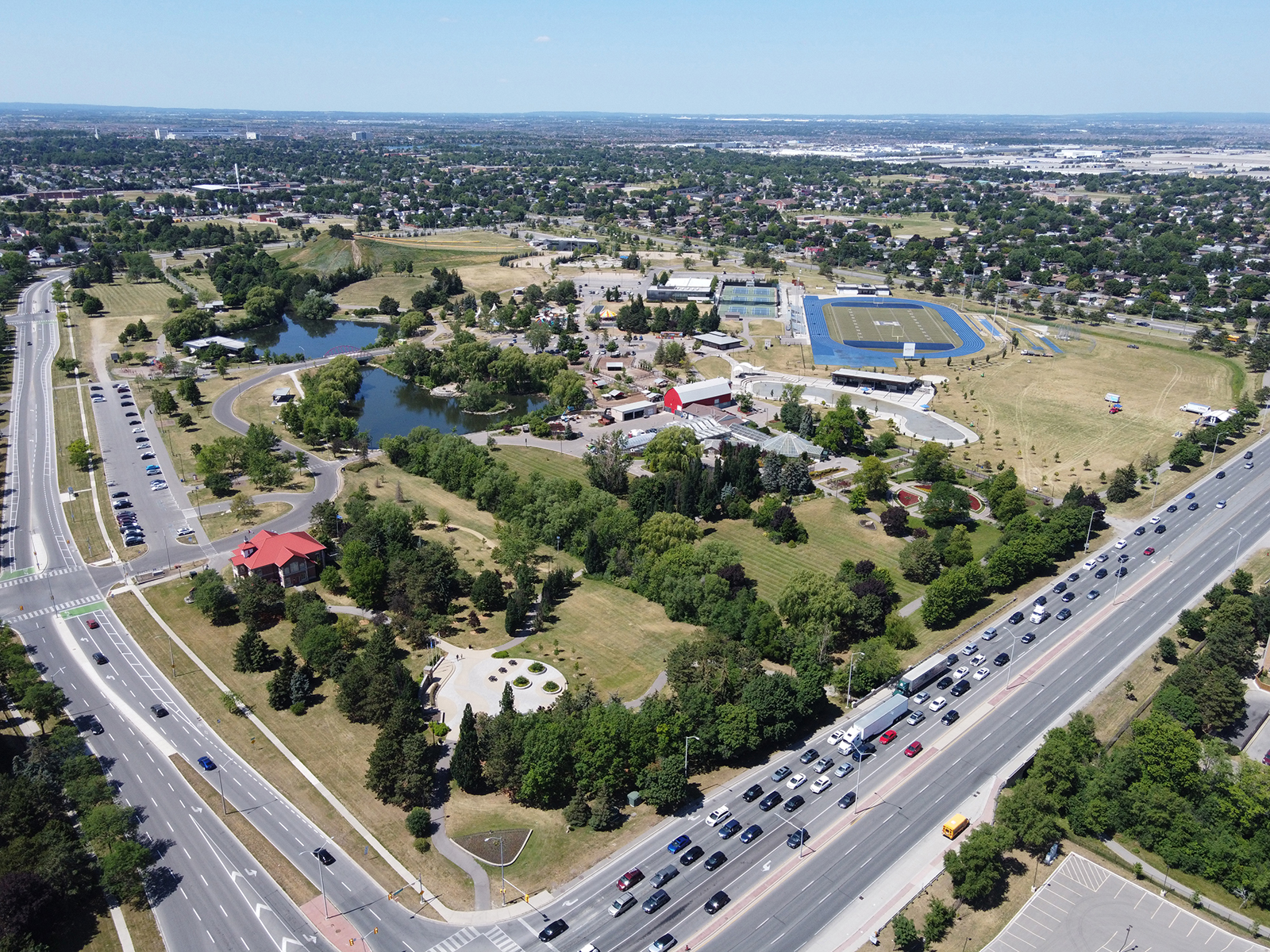
Donald M. Gordon Chinguacousy Park and its facilities in Brampton.

In 2022, there was 2,003 hectares (4,950 acres) of parkland in Brampton, comprising 14 per cent of the city's total area. About 47 per cent of the total parkland is made up of natural area, with 53 per cent of Brampton's parkland being actively managed. There is approximately 5.7 hectares (14 acres) of municipal parkland for every 1,000 people living in Brampton. In addition to municipal parkland, the city also contains 1,007 hectares (2,490 acres) parkland that is maintained by a conservation authority.

There are 4 dog parks, 7 community gardens and urban farms, 344 playgrounds, and 9 public washrooms in Brampton's parklands.

==== Mississauga ====
In 2022, there was 2,950 hectares (7,300 acres) of parkland in Mississauga, comprising 10 per cent of the city's total area. About 39 per cent of the total parkland is made up of natural area, with 61 per cent of Mississauga parkland being actively managed. There is approximately 4.1 hectares (10 acres) of municipal parkland for every 1,000 people living in Mississauga. In 2021, the city's capital park expenditure was over $60.8 million.

There are more than 500 parks in Mississauga. There are 8 dog parks, 10 community gardens and urban farms, 267 playgrounds, and 36 public washrooms in Mississauga's parklands.

==== Richmond Hill ====
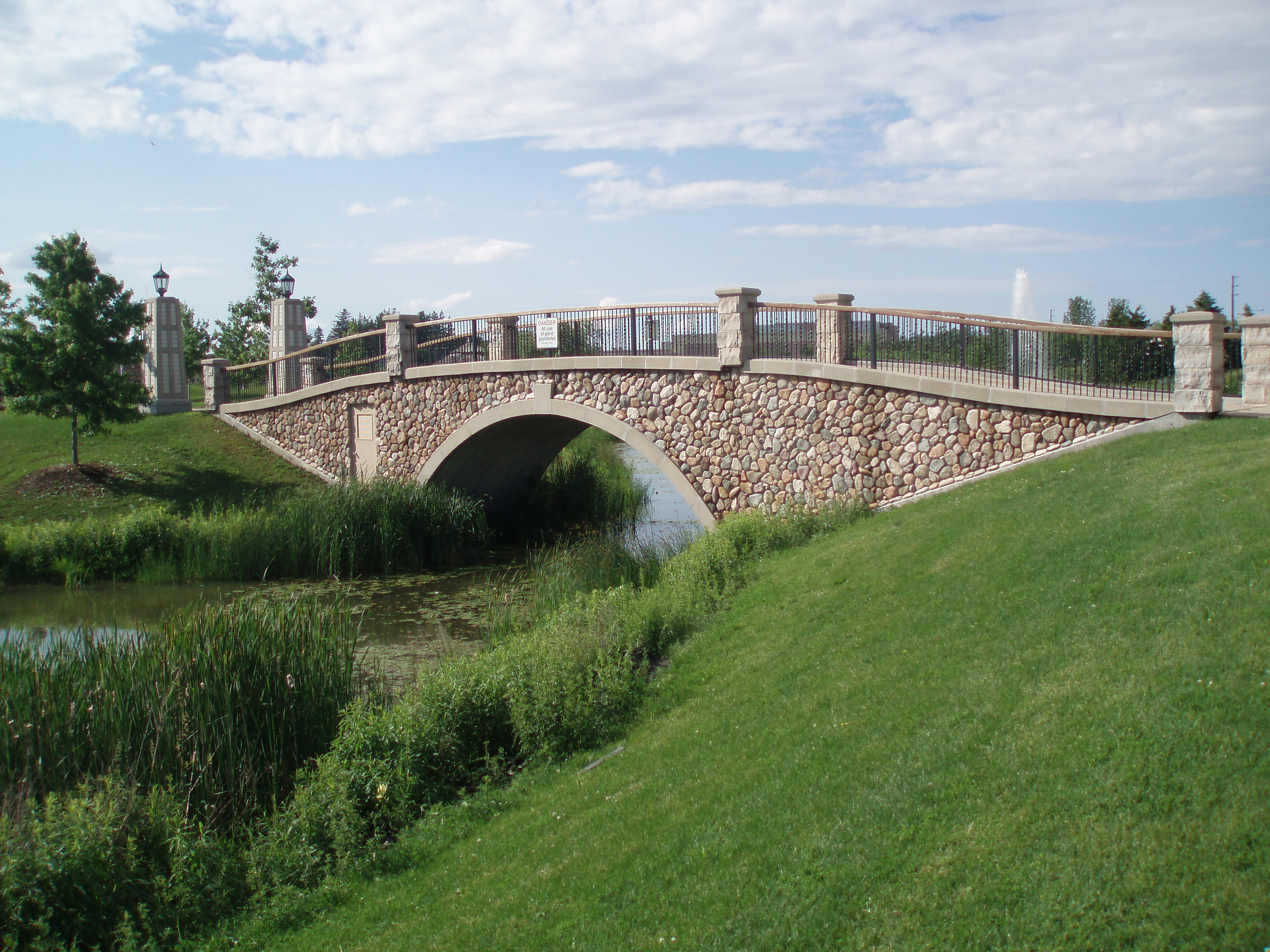
A pedestrian bridge at Richmond Green in Richmond Hill.

In 2022, there was 1,059 hectares (2,620 acres) of parkland in Richmond Hill, comprising 10 per cent of the city's total area. Parkland makes up 10 per cent of the city's total area. About 66 per cent of the total parkland is made up of natural area, with 34 per cent of Richmond Hill's parkland being actively managed. There is approximately 5.2 hectares (13 acres) of municipal parkland for every 1,000 people living in Richmond Hill. In 2021, the city's capital park expenditure was over $4.6 million. In addition to municipal parkland, the city also contains 940 hectares (2,300 acres) parkland that is maintained by a conservation authority, the provincial government, or the federal government.

There are 167 parks in Richmond Hill. There are 2 dog parks, 8 community gardens and urban farms, 226 playgrounds, and 8 public washrooms in Richmond Hill's parklands.

==== Uxbridge ====
On July 1, 2024, the Ontario government opened the Uxbridge Urban Provincial Park in the Township of Uxbridge. The park is the province's first urban provincial park. The park was first announced in the 2023 provincial budget, and the proposed urban park may include up to 532 hectares (1,315 acres) of provincially owned lands. Instead of a single connected block, the park is made up of individual parcels of lands within the Uxbridge area. And while they are not all currently connected, it is possible they might be linked by other lands, recreational areas, and trail systems in the future.

==== Toronto ====
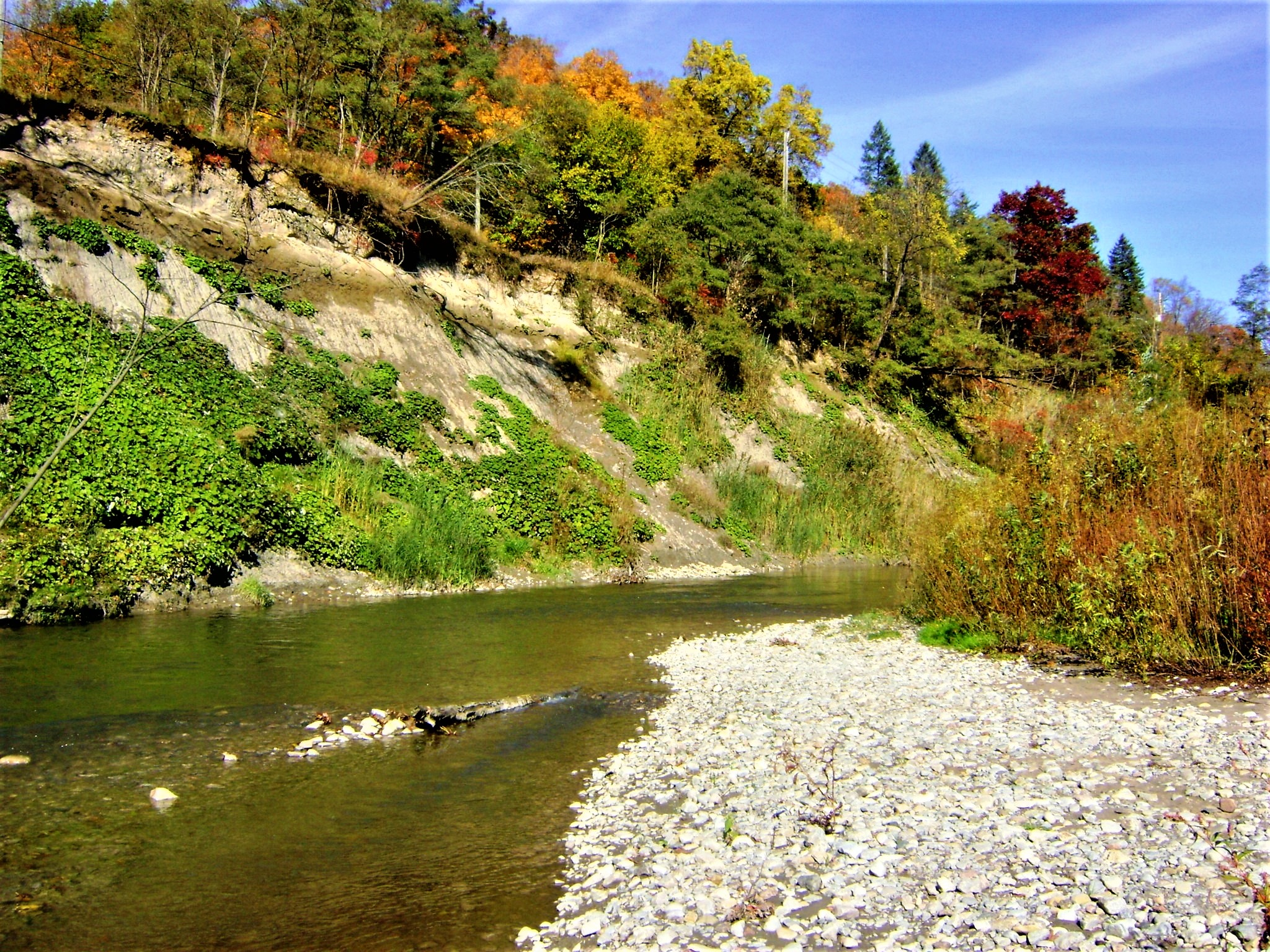
The Rouge National Urban Park is an urban park built around the Rouge River ravine, one of many ravines in the Toronto ravine system.

In 2022, there was 8,086 hectares (19,980 acres) of parkland in Toronto, comprising 13 per cent of the city's total area. About 46 per cent of the total parkland is made up of natural area, with 54 per cent of Toronto's parkland being actively managed. In 2021, 23 per cent of the city's total parkland was considered environmentally significant. There is approximately 2.9 hectares (7.2 acres) of municipal parkland for every 1,000 people living in Toronto.

In total, there are 1,600 parks maintained by the Toronto Parks, Forestry and Recreation Division, whose capital parks expenditure was over $75.1 million in 2021. There are 74 dog parks, 70 community gardens and urban farms, 876 playgrounds, and 178 public washrooms in Toronto's parklands. Several urban parks in the city are connected to or form a part of the Toronto ravine system.

=== Tri-Cities ===
==== Kitchener ====
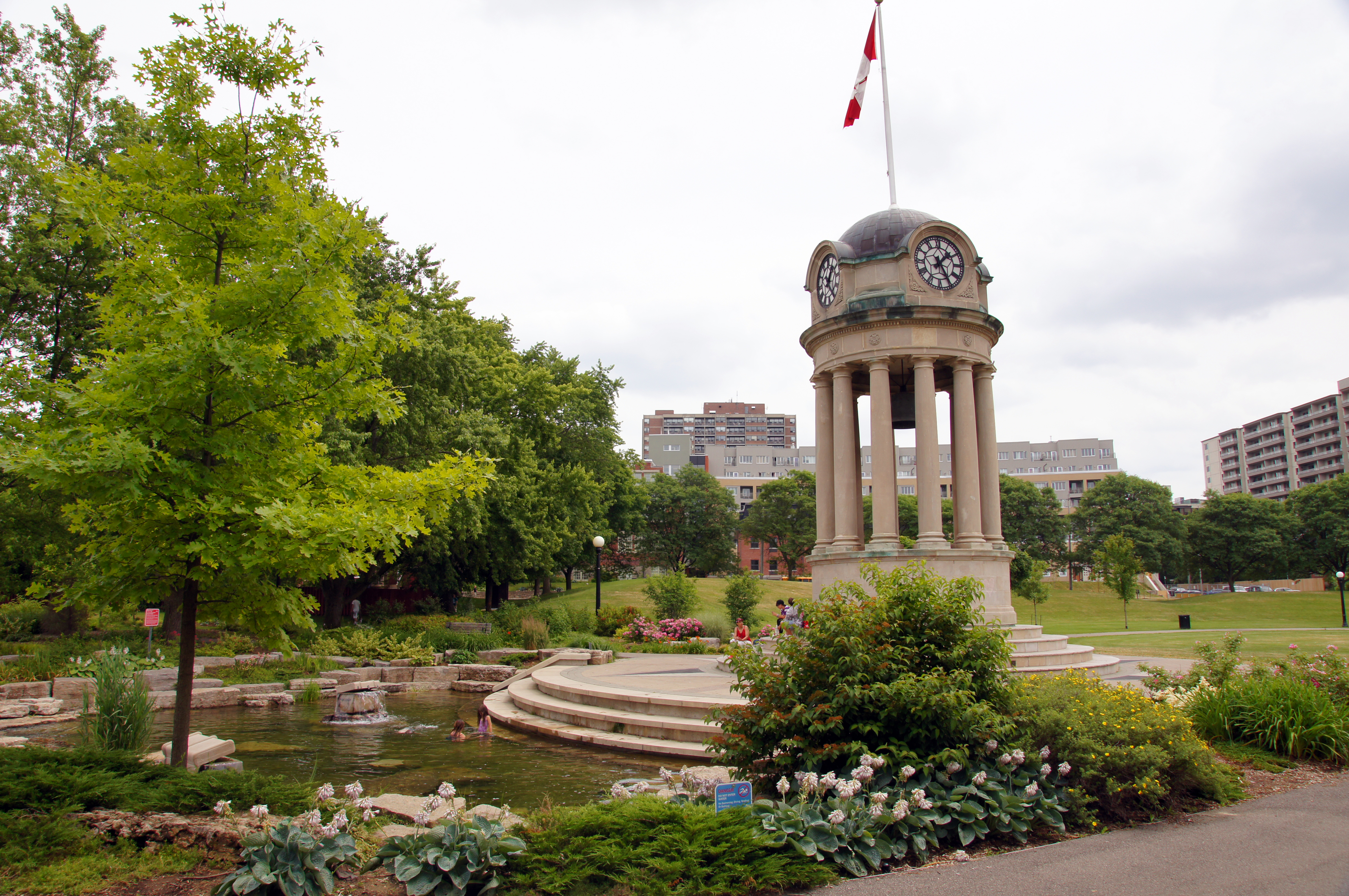
A clock tower at Victoria Park in Kitchener.

In 2022, there was 1,722 hectares (4,260 acres) of parkland in Kitchener, comprising 12 per cent of the city's total area. About 52 per cent of the total parkland is made up of natural area, with 48 per cent of Kitchener's parkland being actively managed. In 2021, 67 per cent of the city's total parkland was considered environmentally significant. There is approximately 6.7 hectares (17 acres) of municipal parkland for every 1,000 people living in Kitchener. In 2021, the city's capital park expenditure was over $4.6 million.

There are 4 dog parks, 21 community gardens and urban farms, 148 playgrounds, and 7 public washrooms in Kitchener's parklands.

==== Waterloo ====
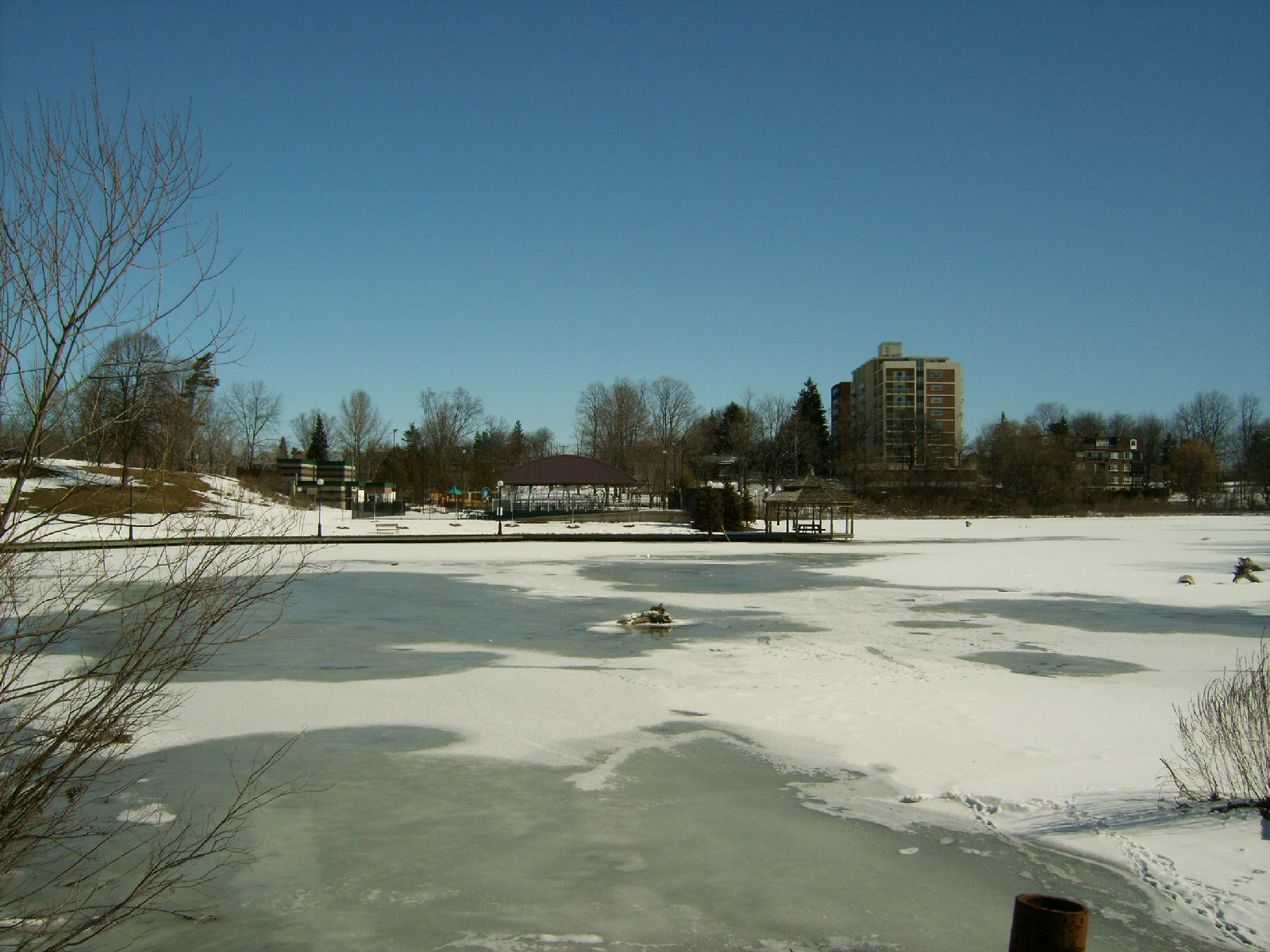
A frozen lake at Waterloo Park in Waterloo

In 2022, there was 946 hectares (2,340 acres) of parkland in Waterloo, comprising 15 per cent of the city's total area. About 56 per cent of the total parkland is made up of natural area, with 44 per cent of Waterloo's parkland being actively managed. There is approximately 5.7 hectares (14 acres) of municipal parkland for every 1,000 people living in Waterloo. In 2021, the city's capital park expenditure was $12 million. In addition to municipal parkland, the city also contains 722 hectares (1,780 acres) parkland that is maintained by a conservation authority, the provincial government, or the federal government.

There are 1 dog parks, 8 community gardens and urban farms, 88 playgrounds, and 87 public washrooms in Waterloo's parklands.

== Parks in Quebec ==
=== Greater Montreal ===
==== Longueuil ====
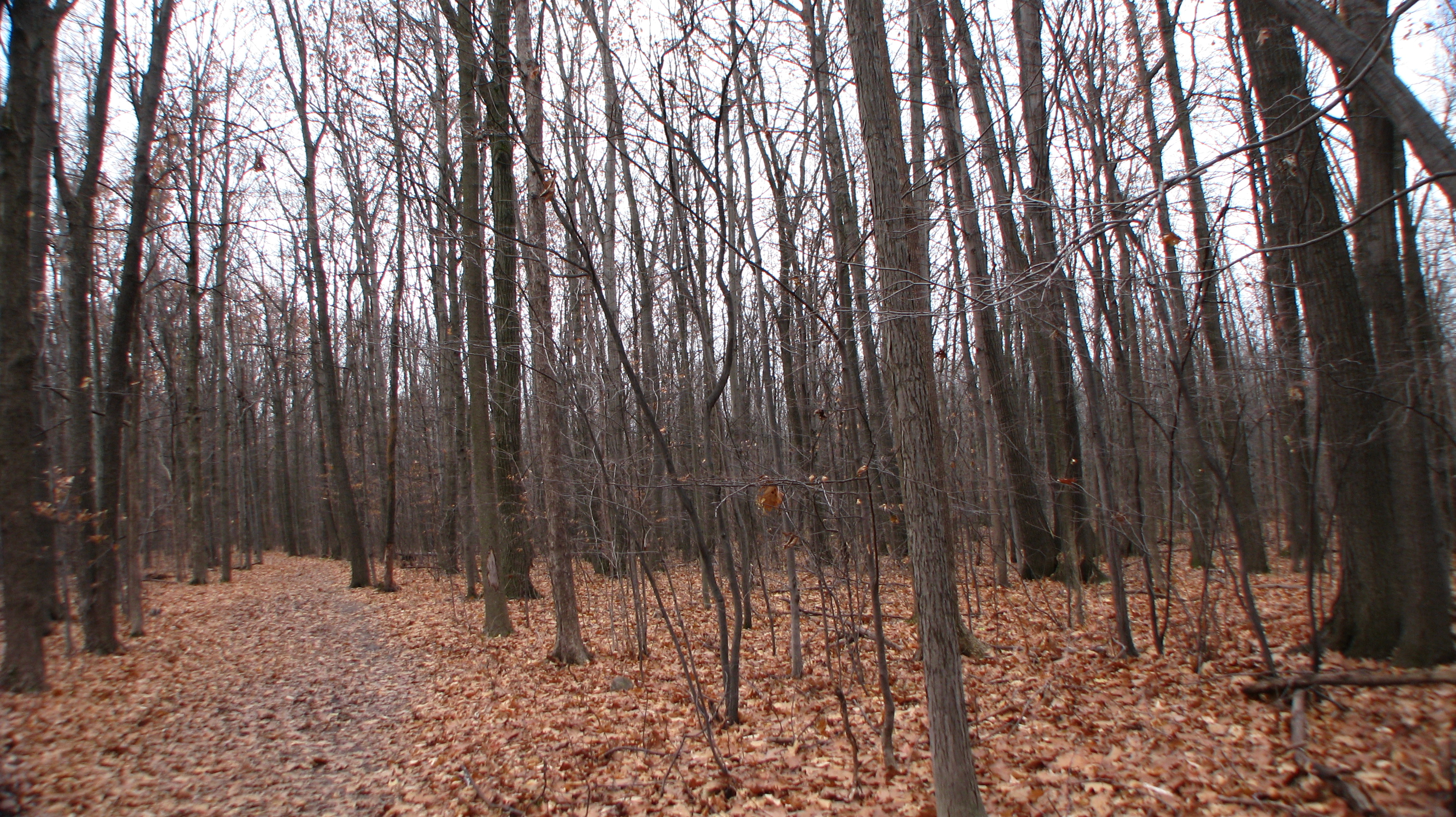
A trail at Parc Michel-Chartrand in Longueuil.

In 2022, there was 1,081 hectares (2,670 acres) of parkland in Longueuil, comprising 9 per cent of the city's total area. About 66 per cent of the total parkland is made up of natural area, with 34 per cent of Longueuil's parkland being actively managed. There is approximately 4.2 hectares (10 acres) of municipal parkland for every 1,000 people living in Longueuil. In 2021, the city's capital park expenditure was $22 million. In addition to municipal parkland, the city also contains 137 hectares (340 acres) parkland that is maintained by a conservation authority, the provincial government, or the federal government.

There are 4 dog parks, 13 community gardens and urban farms, 136 playgrounds, and 75 public washrooms in Longueuil's parklands.

==== Montreal ====
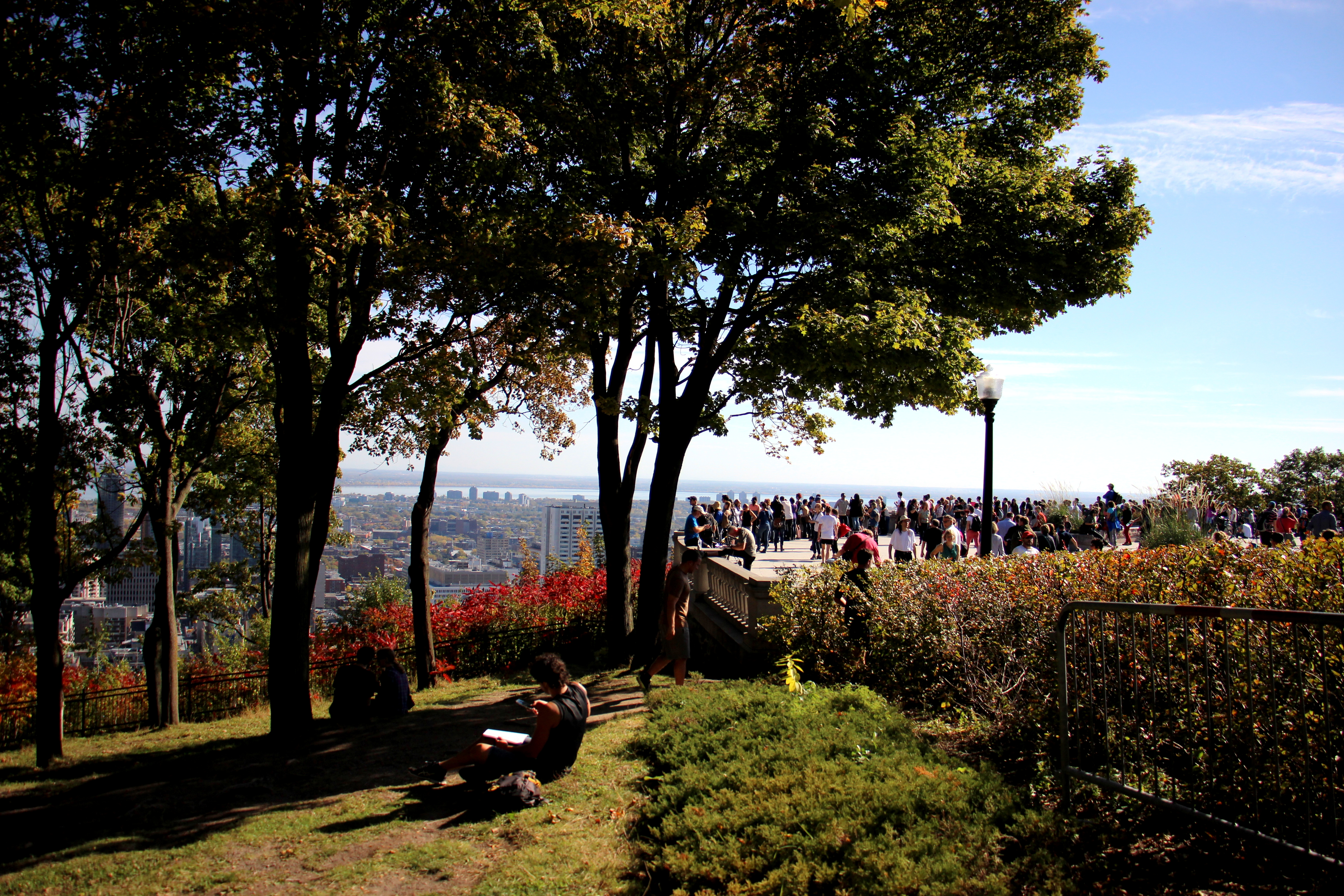
A lookout point at Mount Royal Park in Montreal

In 2022, there was 6,446 hectares (15,930 acres) of municipal parkland in Montreal, comprising 2 per cent of the city's total area. About 30 per cent of the total parkland is made up of natural area, with 52 per cent of Montreal's parkland being actively managed. There is approximately 3.7 hectares (9.1 acres) of municipal parkland for every 1,000 people living in Montreal. In 2021, the city's capital parks expenditure was $125 million. In addition to municipal parkland, the city also contains 1,819 hectares (4,490 acres) of parkland that is maintained by a conservation authority, the provincial government, or the federal government.

There are more than 1,495 parks in the city. There are 62 dog parks, 98 community gardens and urban farms, 969 playgrounds, and 20 public washrooms in Montreal's parklands. (Note: The following washroom figure do not include facilities located at La Fontaine Park and Jeanne Mance Park.)

=== Quebec City ===
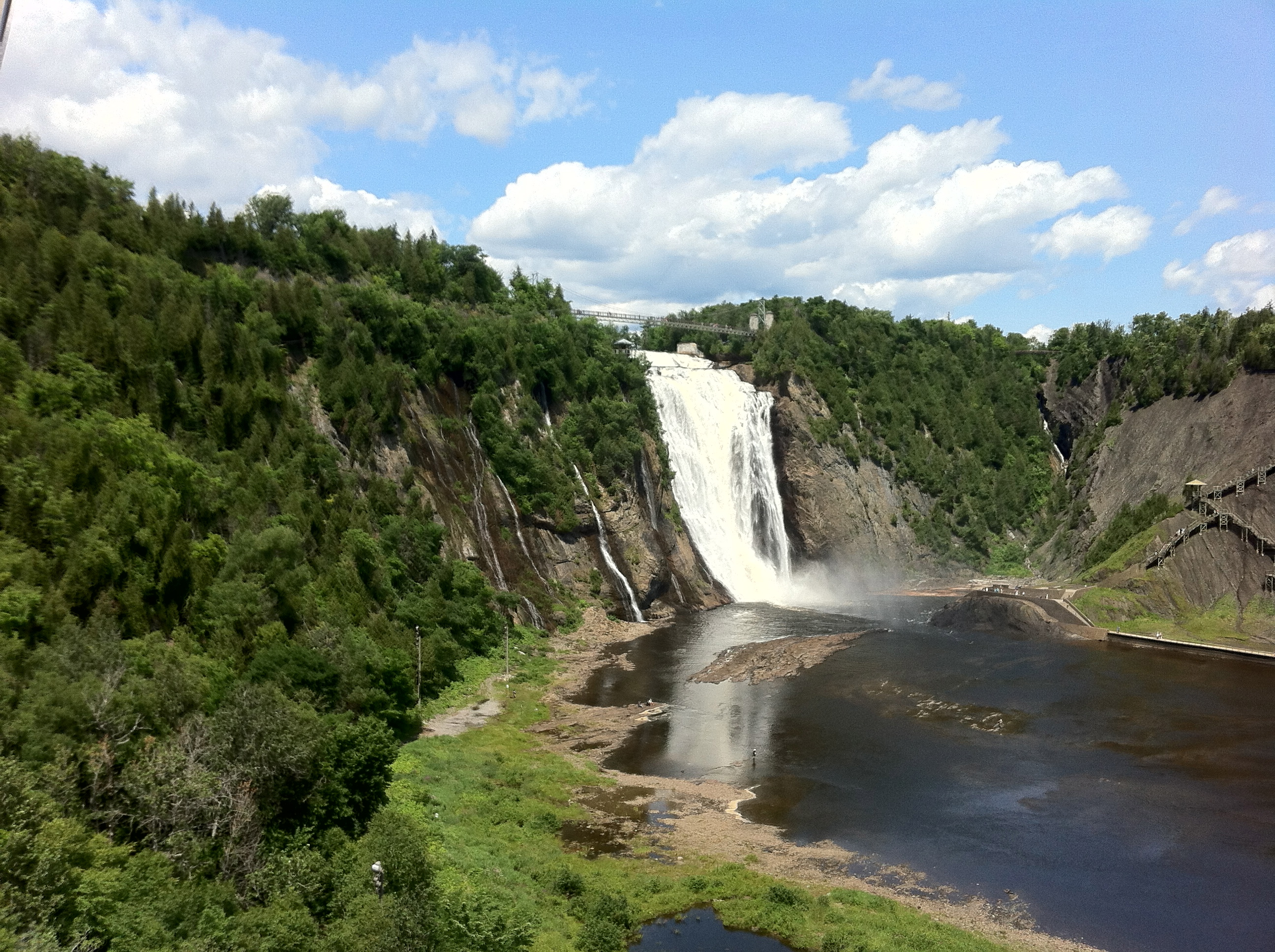
Montmorency Falls at Montmorency Falls Park in Quebec City.

In 2022, there was 4,208 hectares (10,400 acres) of parkland in Quebec City, comprising 9 per cent of the city's total area. About 66 per cent of the total parkland is made up of natural area, with 34 per cent of Quebec City's parkland being actively managed. There is approximately 7.7 hectares (19 acres) of municipal parkland for every 1,000 people living in Quebec City. In 2021, the city's capital parks expenditure was over $19.3 million. In addition to municipal parkland, the city also contains 390 hectares (960 acres) of parkland that is maintained by a conservation authority, the provincial government, or the federal government.

There are 5 dog parks, 36 community gardens and urban farms, 460 playgrounds, and 65 public washrooms in Quebec City's parklands.

== Parks in the Prairies ==
=== Calgary ===
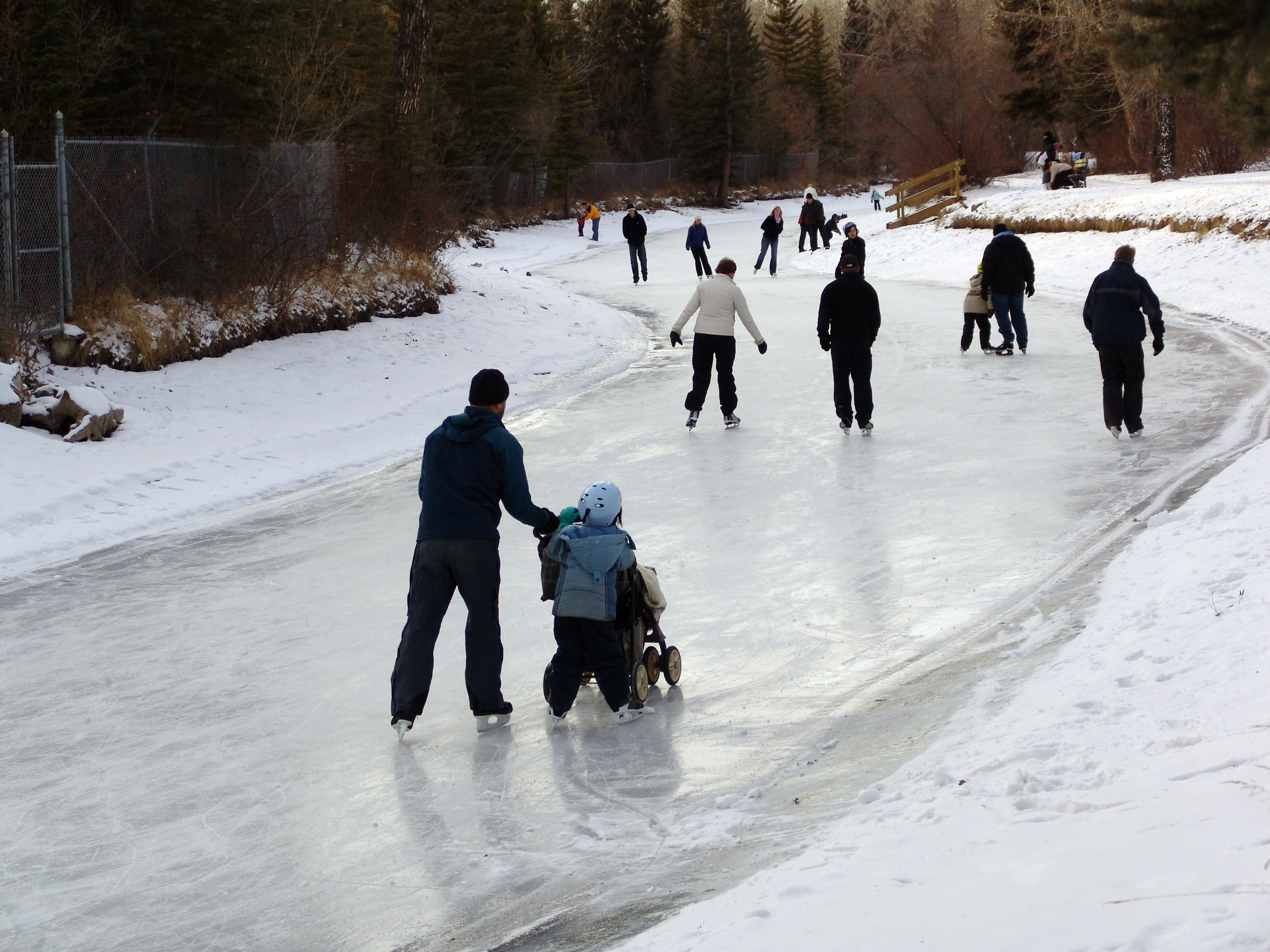
A skate trail at Bowness Park in Calgary.

In 2022, there was 8,695 hectares (21,490 acres) of parkland in Calgary, comprising 10 per cent of the city's total area. About 56 per cent of the total parkland is made up of natural area, with 44 per cent of Calgary's parkland being actively managed. In 2021, 25 per cent of the city's total parkland considered environmentally significant. There is approximately 6.7 hectares (17 acres) of municipal parkland for every 1,000 people living in Calgary. In 2021, the city's capital park expenditure was over $59.2 million.

The city maintains over 475 soccer fields, 430 baseball diamonds, and 1,000 kilometres (620 mi) of pathways in its parklands. There are 159 dog parks, 59 community gardens and urban farms, 1,137 playgrounds, and 5 public washrooms in Calgary's parklands.

=== Edmonton ===
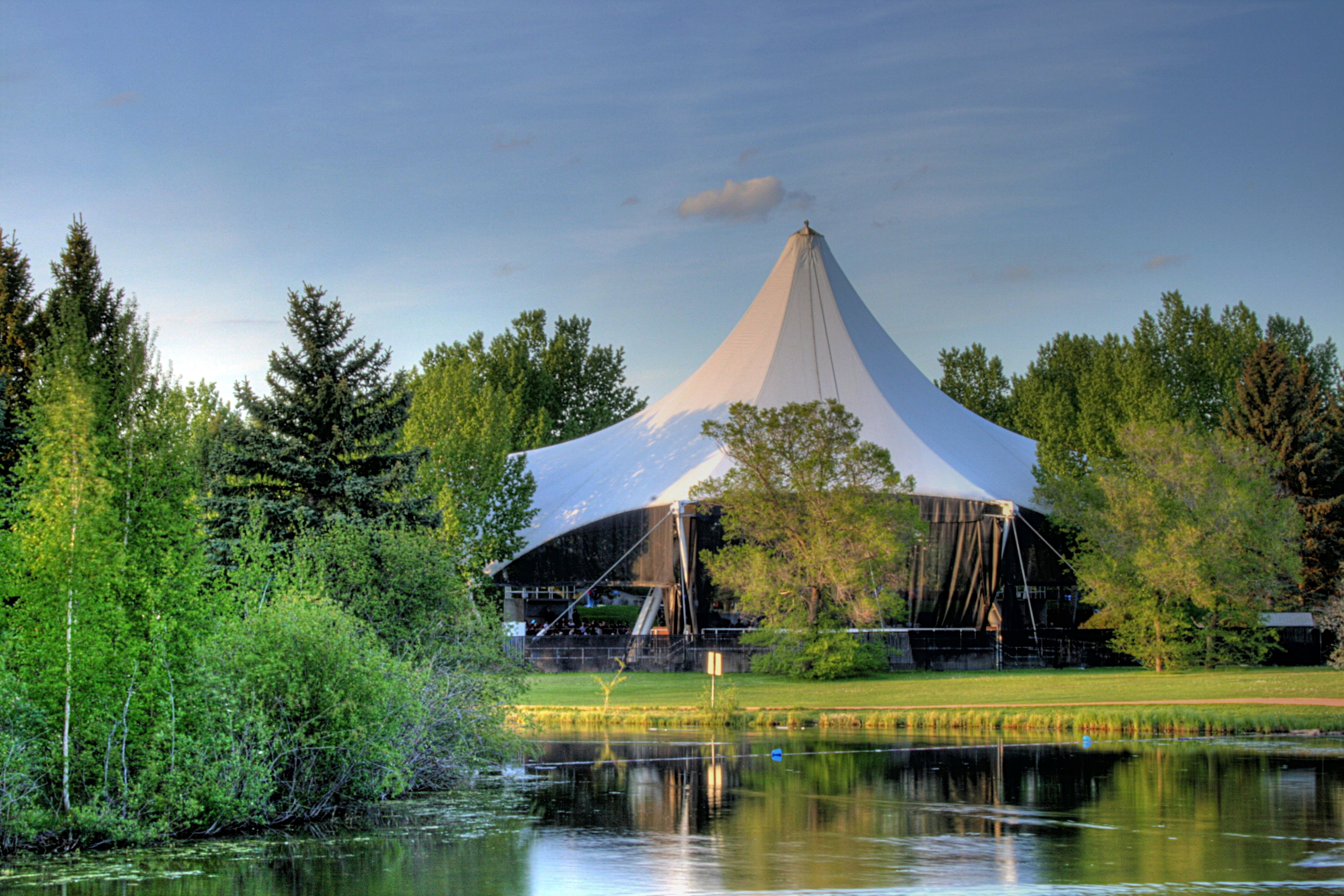
The Heritage Amphitheatre at William Hawrelak Park. The park forms part of the North Saskatchewan River valley parks system.

In 2022, there was 6,106 hectares (15,090 acres) of parkland in Edmonton, comprising 8 per cent of the city's total area. About 42 per cent of the total parkland is made up of natural area, with 58 per cent of Edmonton's parkland being actively managed. In 2021, 2 per cent of the city's total parkland was considered environmentally significant. There is approximately 6 hectares (15 acres) of municipal parkland for every 1,000 people living in Edmonton. In 2021, the city's capital park expenditure was over $61.9 million.

There are over 875 parks located in Edmonton. There are 56 dog parks, 107 community gardens and urban farms, 426 playgrounds, and 41 public washrooms in Edmonton's parklands. Approximately 4,600 hectares (11,000 acres) of grassland is maintained by the city for sports and leisure. Several of these parks form a part of the North Saskatchewan River valley parks system, a 7,284-hectare (18,000-acre) park system that runs through Edmonton and the neighbouring municipalities of Devon and Fort Saskatchewan. In total, there are 20 parks contained in the park system, forming the largest expanse of urban parkland in Canada.

=== Lethbridge ===
In 2022, there was 2,964 hectares (7,320 acres) of parkland in Lethbridge, comprising 23 per cent of the city's total area. About 69 per cent of the total parkland is made up of natural area, with 31 per cent of Lethbridge's parkland being actively managed. There is approximately 30.1 hectares (74 acres) of municipal parkland for every 1,000 people living in Lethbridge. In 2021, the city's capital park expenditure was over $2.2 million.

There are over 130 parks in Lethbridge. There are 4 dog parks, 6 community gardens and urban farms, 124 playgrounds, and 16 public washrooms in Lethbridge's parklands.

=== Regina ===
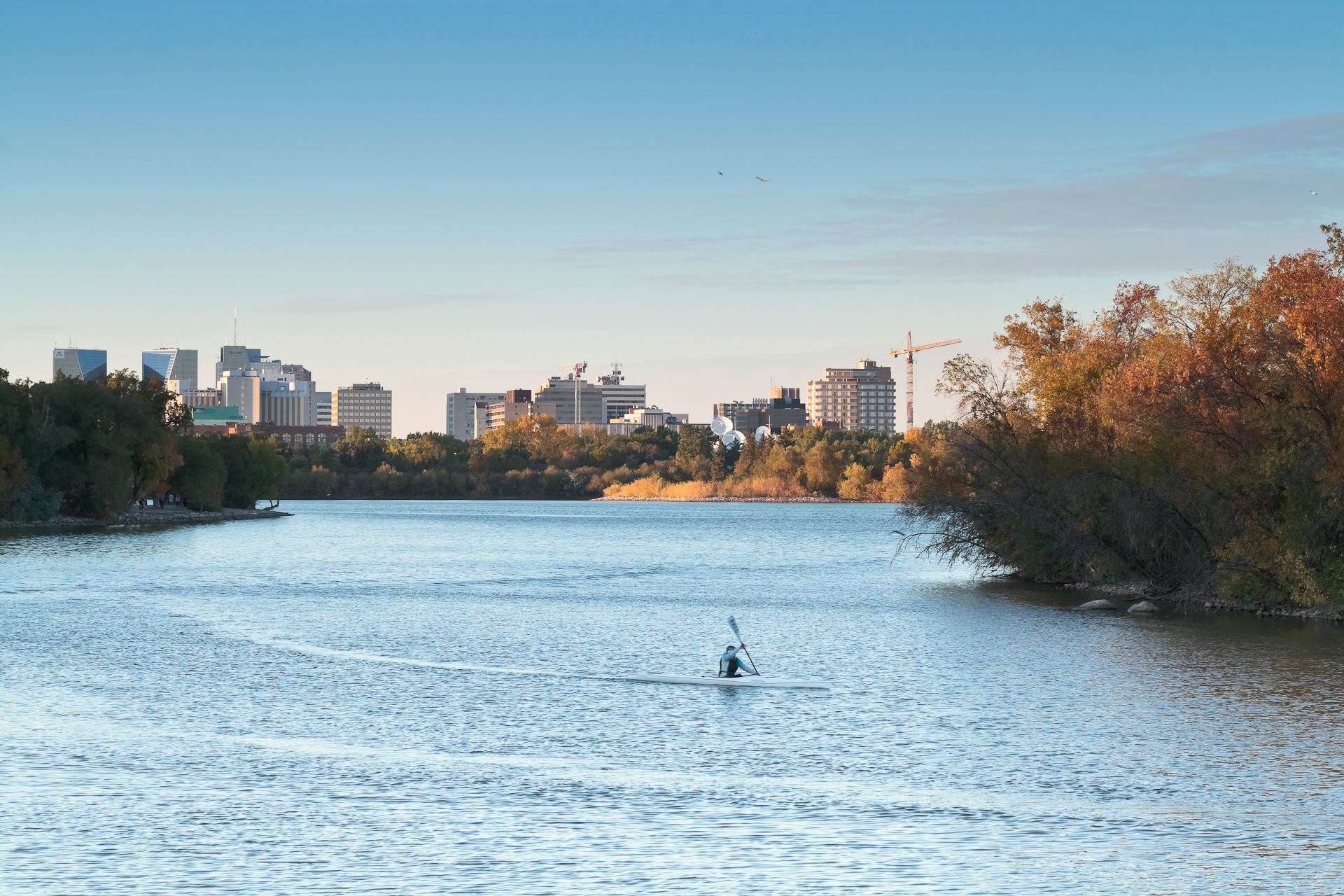
A person kayaking at the lake in Regina's Wascana Park.

In 2022, there was 1,333 hectares (3,290 acres) of parkland in Regina, comprising 7 per cent of the city's total area. About 12 per cent of the total parkland is made up of natural area, with 88 per cent of Regina's parkland being actively managed. There is approximately 5.9 hectares (15 acres) of municipal parkland for every 1,000 people living in Regina. In 2021, the city's capital park expenditure was over $1 million. In addition to municipal parkland, the city also contains 930 hectares (2,300 acres) of parkland that is maintained by a conservation authority, the provincial government, or the federal government.

There are 3 dog parks, 9 community gardens and urban farms, 153 playgrounds, and 3 public washrooms in Regina's parklands.

=== Saskatoon ===
In 2022, there was 1,047 hectares (2,590 acres) of parkland in Saskatoon, comprising 4 per cent of the city's total area. About 11 per cent of the total parkland is made up of natural area, with 89 per cent of Saskatoon's parkland being actively managed. There is approximately 3.9 hectares (9.6 acres) of municipal parkland for every 1,000 people living in Saskatoon. In 2021, the city's capital park expenditure was over $5.5 million.

There are over 200 parks in Saskatoon. There are 11 dog parks, 55 community gardens and urban farms, 178 playgrounds, and 13 public washrooms in Regina's parklands.

=== Winnipeg ===
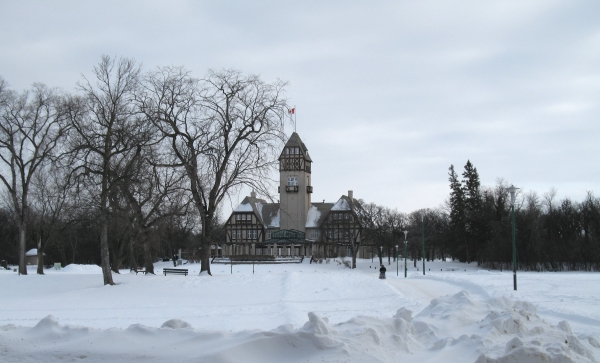
Assiniboine Park in Winnipeg, with the Assiniboine Park Pavilion in the background

In 2022, there was 3,517 hectares (8,690 acres) of parkland in Winnipeg, comprising 7 per cent of the city's total area. About 34 per cent of the total parkland is made up of natural area, with 66 per cent of Winnipeg's parkland being actively managed. In 2021, 36 per cent of the city's total parkland considered environmentally significant. There is approximately 4.7 hectares (12 acres) of municipal parkland for every 1,000 people living in Winnipeg. In 2021, the city's capital park expenditure was over $3.3 million.

There are more than 1,000 parks in the city. There are 17 dog parks, 50 community gardens and urban farms, 546 playgrounds, and 64 public washrooms in Winnipeg's parklands.

== See also ==
- List of Canadian protected areas (including provincial parks)
- List of National Parks of Canada
- List of urban parks by size
