= Boisé du Tremblay =

Woodland in Longueuil, Quebec, Canada

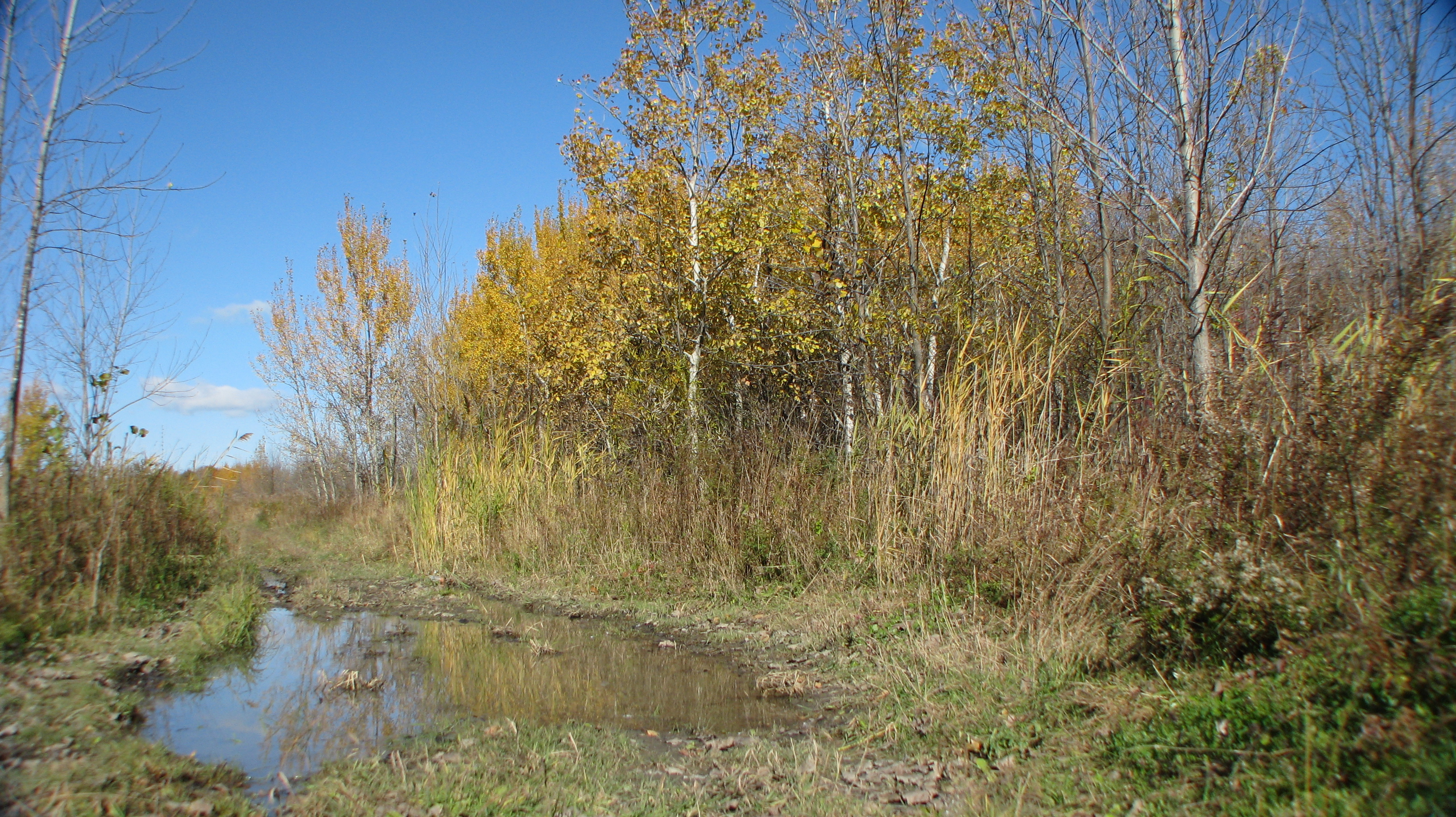
- The Boisé du Tremblay in October 2010

- Location within Greater Montreal
- Location: Le Vieux-Longueuil and Boucherville
- Nearest city: Longueuil, Quebec, Canada
- Coordinates: 45°32′N 73°26′W
- Area: 267 hectares (660 acres)

The Boisé du Tremblay is a wooded area in Longueuil, Quebec, Canada. The wooded area is located partially in the borough of Le Vieux-Longueuil and partially within the city of Boucherville.

The territory of the woods is 267 hectares (660 acres), of which 174 hectares (430 acres) belongs to the City of Longueuil.

== Species ==
The Boisé du Tremblay's biodiversity is considered to be unique within the Montérégie region. It is part of the blue-green infrastructure of Greater Montreal as well as the Mont Saint-Bruno Forest Corridor. It is home to numerous species of flora and fauna, notably the Western chorus frog.

== History ==
In January 2012, the City of Longueuil requested that the Boisé du Tremblay be recognized as a Wildlife Reserve by the Quebec Ministry of Natural Resources and Wildlife.

== See also ==
- Parc Michel-Chartrand
