= Parc Michel-Chartrand =

Park in Quebec, Canada

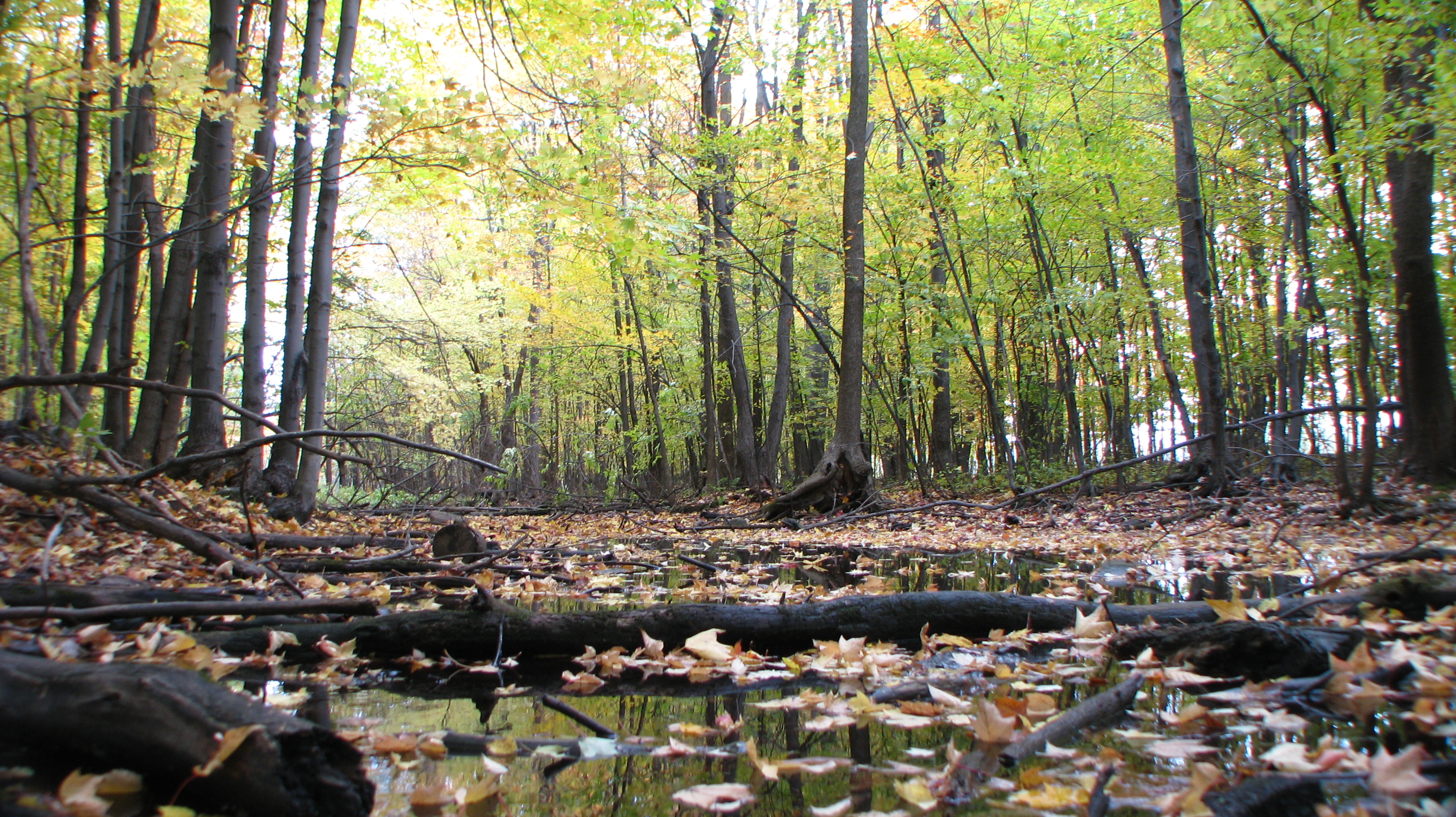
- Parc Michel-Chartrand in October 2010

- Location within Greater Montreal
- Location: Le Vieux-Longueuil, Longueuil, Quebec, Canada
- Coordinates: 45°32′49″N 73°28′08″W
- Area: 185 hectares (460 acres)
- Operator: City of Longueuil

Parc Michel-Chartrand, formerly known as the Parc régional de Longueuil, is a large park located in Longueuil, Quebec, Canada. It is located at 1895 Rue Adoncour in the borough of Le Vieux-Longueuil.

It is 1,850,000 square metres (19,900,000 sq ft) in area. It offers 12.5 kilometres (7.8 mi) of Cross-country skiing trails and 10 kilometres (6.2 mi) of hiking trails.

Its features include a marsh, three artificial lakes, a sundial, a playground, two pétanque terrains, a rest area with picnic tables, a slope for sledding, an ice rink and community gardens.

Originally known as the Base de plein air de Longueuil (opened in 1975), it was renamed as the Parc régional de Longueuil, and renamed again as Parc Michel-Chartrand by the city of Longueuil in June 2010, after Quebec union activist Michel Chartrand.

Until the mid 1980s, prior to the extension of the Boulevard Fernand-Lafontaine, the Chemin du Lac was open to through traffic between Longueuil and Boucherville.

== See also ==
- Boisé du Tremblay
