= Stauffer =

Stauffer (also commonly spelled "Stouffer" and "Stover" in North America) is a German surname, the origin of which derives from the Proto-German word staupa, meaning "steep." Staupa and its Middle High German descendant, stouf, evolved to mean, among other things, a steep hill or mountain. Many of these hills and mountains serve as the basis for the names of such places as Donaustauf, Hohenstaufen, Staufenberg, Regenstauf, Staufen im Breisgau, and the Staufens of Switzerland and Austria. Stauffer surnames derive from these hills. The Swiss Mennonite Stauffers common in the U.S. and Canada derive their name from a hill called Stouffe or Stauffenalp just southwest of the town of Röthenbach im Emmental in Switzerland.

Notable people with the surname include:

- Alan Stauffer (born 1945), American politician
- Brenda Stauffer (born 1961), American former field hockey player
- Brian Stauffer (born 1966), American artist and illustrator
- Clara Stauffer (1904–1984), Spanish Falangist and Nazi ratline operator
- Christian Stauffer (1579–16??), Swiss Anabaptist leader
- Christian M. Stauffer (1896–1963), American politician
- Devin Stauffer (born 1970), American philosopher and political scientist
- Dietrich Stauffer (1943–2019), German theoretical physicist
- Donald Alfred Stauffer (1902–1952), American literary critic, novelist and professor of English
- Ethelbert Stauffer (1902–1979), German Protestant theologian and numismatist
- Gordon C. Stauffer (1930–2019), American college basketball player and coach
- Grant Stauffer (1888–1949), American coal and railroad executive
- Jack Stauffer (born 1945), American actor
- Jay Richard Stauffer Jr., American ichthyologist
- Johann Georg Stauffer (1778–1853), Austrian luthier
- John Stauffer (politician) (1925–2019), American politician and businessman
- John Stauffer (professor), American academic
- Joseph Stauffer (1874–1917), Canadian politician
- Jürg M. Stauffer (born 1977), Swiss politician
- Leslie Stauffer (1888–1963), American college football player and coach
- Lucas Stauffer (born 1995), American soccer player
- Maurice H. Stauffer (1915-1994), American gastroenterologist who identified the Stauffer syndrome
- Nathan Stauffer (1875–1959), American football player and coach
- Oscar S. Stauffer (1886–1982), American mass media mogul and company founder
- Rudolph Stauffer (1836–1918), Swiss-born American soldier awarded the Medal of Honor
- Serge Stauffer (1929–1989), Swiss artist and art educator
- Suzanne M. Stauffer (born 1957), American librarian and professor emerita
- S. Walter Stauffer (1888–1975), American politician
- Teddy Stauffer (1909–1993), Swiss bandleader, musician, actor, nightclub owner, and restaurateur
- Théodore Stauffer (1901–1971), Swiss boxer
- Tim Stauffer (born 1982), American Major League Baseball pitcher
- Todd Stauffer, 21st century co-founder and publisher of the Jackson Free Press
