= Stauffer (disambiguation) =

Stauffer is a surname. It may also refer to:

- Stauffer, Alberta, Canada, an unincorporated community
- Stauffer Creek, Alberta, Canada
- Stauffer Chemical, chemical company of the United States which manufactured herbicides
- Stauffer Communications, media company of the United States

== See also ==
- Stauffer syndrome, constellation of signs and symptoms of liver dysfunction
- Stauffer Mennonite
