= Stouffville =

Urban area in Whitchurch-Stouffville, Ontario, Canada

- Unincorporated town
- Motto: Country close to the City
- Location within York
- Coordinates: 43°58′24″N 79°14′50″W
- Country: Canada
- Province: Ontario
- Regional municipality: York Region
- Town: Whitchurch-Stouffville
- Incorporated: Village of Stouffville 1877
- Amalgamation (with Whitchurch Township): January 1, 1971

Government
  - MPP: Paul Calandra
  - MP: Helena Jaczek

Area
  - Land: 14.17 km^{2} (5.47 sq mi)
- Elevation: 266 m (873 ft)

Population (2021)
  - Total: 36,753
  - Density: 2,593.6/km^{2} (6,717/sq mi)
- Time zone: UTC−05:00 (EST)
  - Summer (DST): UTC−04:00 (EDT)
- Forward sortation area: L4A
- Area codes: 905, 289, 365, and 742
- Website: www.town.whitchurch-stouffville.on.ca

Stouffville (/ˈstoʊvɪl/) is the primary urban area within the town of Whitchurch-Stouffville in York Region, Ontario, Canada. It is situated within the Greater Toronto Area and the inner ring of the Golden Horseshoe. The urban area is centred at the intersection of Main Street (York Regional Road 14), Mill Street, and Market Street. Between 2006 and 2011, the population of the Community of Stouffville grew 100.5% from 12,411 to 24,886, or from 51% to 66% of the total population of the larger town of Whitchurch-Stouffville. The population of Stouffville from the 2021 census is 36,753.

== History ==
The settlement was founded in 1804 by Abraham Stouffer and was originally named Stoufferville. Stouffer built a sawmill and grist mill on the banks of Duffin's Creek in the 1820s. The name of the community was shortened to Stouffville when its first post office opened in 1832.

In 1877, Stouffville became an incorporated village. On January 1, 1971, the Village of Stouffville was amalgamated with Whitchurch Township and was designated a community within the larger town of Whitchurch-Stouffville; with amalgamation, the town boundary was extended four farm lots south of its previous limit near Main Street (the land was formerly a part of Markham Township). The population of urban Stouffville in 1971 was 5,036.

In 2003, a large 16th-century Wendat (Huron-Wendat) village was discovered; approximately 2000 people once inhabited the site, dubbed Mantle Site, which included a palisade and more than 80 longhouses, yielding tens of thousands of artifacts.

== Geography ==
Urban Stouffville is approximately 4.5 km long, stretching from the York-Durham Line to Highway 48, and approximately 2.7 km wide with development north and south of Main Street. Stouffville is bounded by farmland and a golf course. The community is located on the Oak Ridges Moraine and the Rouge River watershed.

== Transportation ==
GO Transit's Stouffville line passes through the community with commuter trains stopping at the Stouffville GO Station in the downtown core and terminating at Old Elm GO Station. Along with GO's Stouffville Line, GO Transit also operates route 71 from Union Station to Mount Joy GO Station or Old Elm GO Station, with limited service to Uxbridge.

York Region Transit's bus 9 (9th Line) travels from the town to Markham Stouffville Hospital and before terminating service at 14th Avenue and Box Grove By-Pass. The YRT also operates YRT On-Request Stouffville; a ride-share service operated with Minivans and Minibuses. Along with YRT On-Request, they also operate a similar service specifically for the disabled; allowing disabled individuals to continue to access and utilize YRT services.

Stouffville Road (Regional Road #14) is the main east–west route that passes through downtown and connects with Highway 404 in the west.

== Demographics ==
In 2006, urban Stouffville had a population of 8,000 to 10,000 people, or about one-third of the population of the larger Town of Whitchurch-Stouffville. The Town of Whitchurch-Stouffville estimates that the population grew more than 58% between 2006 and 2011; most of that growth was limited to the Community of Stouffville or the Community of Ballantrae. Based on the 2021 census the town's total population is 36,753, growth of 8.8% from the 2016 population of 32,634.

== Growth ==
With connection to a massive new sewage system (also known as the Big Pipe) and a water pipe from Lake Ontario, urban Stouffville began to grow rapidly after 2005. The first of the new subdivisions were south of Main Street along Hoover Park Drive (Wheler's Mill and Wheler's on Main subdivisions), and north of Main Street along Millard Street west of Ninth Line.

In 2008, construction began to widen Stouffville Road / Main Street from two lanes to four lanes, from Ninth Line to the edge of urban Stouffville at Highway 48 (the community of Ringwood), and further to McCowan Road. Construction was completed in June 2010. Stouffville Road has since been widened up to Highway 404.

== Notable residents ==
- Keith Acton, National Hockey League player and coach
- Capt. Arthur Roy Brown DSC and Bar, RNAS (23 December 1893 – 9 March 1944), World War I flying ace who spent the latter years of his life running a farm in Stouffville.
- Michael Del Zotto, National Hockey League player
- Nicole Dollanganger, musician
- Peter Gibbons, racing driver
- Dalton Kellett, racing driver
- Liz Knox, Canadian Women's Hockey League player; Professional Women's Hockey Players Association founding board member and player
- Jeff Marek, NHL and CHL analyst for Sportsnet
- Brad May, National Hockey League player; Stanley Cup winner with the Anaheim Ducks
- Jane Philpott, former President of the Treasury Board and MP of the Liberal Party of Canada
- K.A. Tucker, novelist
- Dean Michael Wiwchar, hitman.
- (See also Notable residents, Whitchurch-Stouffville)

== Nearest communities ==
Urban Stouffville is situated in the southeast corner of the town of Whitchurch-Stouffville. Neighbouring communities within the town include Ringwood and Gormley to the east, and Bloomington to the north. Claremont, Uxbridge, and the ghost town of Altona (part of Pickering) lie to the east. Stouffville is bordered on the south by the city of Markham.

== Heritage and culture ==
=== List of historic buildings ===
- Bloomington Gospel Church - 13660 9th Line 1874
- Bogarttown Public School 1857 - now part of Whitchurch-Stouffville Museum
- Co-Op Grain Elevator c. 1916 – demolished 2015
- James Brown Homestead 1850s - last lived in 1950s and transferred to Whitchurch-Stouffville Museum in 1984
- Lebovic Centre for Arts & Entertainment – Nineteen on the Park 1896 - Romanesque Revival market/concert hall
- St James Presbyterian Church 6432 Main Street 1894
- Stouffville Memorial Christian Church - 6528 Main Street 1892
- Stouffville Station 1871 - built by Toronto and Nipissing Railway, then as Grant Trunk Stouffville Junction and demolished in 1980s and replaced by current GO station
- Stouffville Wesley Church 15296 Woodbine Avenue 1881
- Vandorf Public School 1871 - now moved to Whitchurch-Stouffville Museum (14732 Woodbine Avenue)

=== Stouffville Farmer's Country Market / Downtown Farmer's Market ===
The town was home to the Farmers Country Market, founded 1952, which sold a variety of produce, prepared foods, live animals, and household items. While once a popular town attraction, the market closed in 2016 after years of decline. The land was sold in 2001 and was slated for re-development during the decade after the sale. Current barn, silo and stalls were demolished following the closure of the site in late 2016. The Liquidation Centre was moved online with pick-up location/cash and carry in Uxbridge, Ontario. Vendors either closed or relocated across the GTA.

Nearby was a downtown farmer's street market hosted by the town and ran from 2009 to 2016. It too has closed and unsure if it will be opened again.

== Education ==
=== Primary and secondary schools ===
- York Region District School Board
  - Spring Lakes Public School
  - Harry Bowes Public School
  - Wendat Village Public School
  - Barbara Reid Public School
  - Summit View Public School
  - Oscar Peterson Public School
  - Glad Park Public School
  - Stouffville District Secondary School
- York Catholic District School Board
  - St. Brigid Catholic Elementary School
  - St. Brendan Catholic Elementary School
  - St. Marks Catholic Elementary School
  - St. Katherine Drexel Catholic Secondary School

== General references ==
- "Stouffville (Code 1020) Census Profile". 2011 census. Government of Canada - Statistics Canada.
