= Stouffer =

Stouffer is an Americanized spelling of the German surname Stauffer, an occupational name for a maker or seller of beakers or mugs. Notable people with the surname include:

- Abraham Stouffer (1781–1851), founder of Stouffville, Ontario
- Abraham E. Stouffer (1875–1936), founder of Stouffer's
- Bill Stouffer (born 1947), American farmer and small business owner
- Ellis Stouffer (1884–1965), American mathematician
- Hannah Stouffer (born 1981), American artist
- Kelly Stouffer (born 1964), NFL Quarterback
- Marty Stouffer (born 1948), narrator and producer of the animal documentary show Wild America
- Nancy Stouffer (fl. 1984–2006), also known as N. K. Stouffer, American children's book author
- Samuel A. Stouffer (1900–1960), American sociologist
- Vernon Stouffer (1901–1972), founder of Stouffer's
- Stouffer, pseudonym of Calvin Harris (born 1984), Scottish musician

== Fictional characters ==
- Stouffer the Cat, puppet of British comedian Harry Hill

== See also ==
- Stouffer's
