= Peter Reesor =

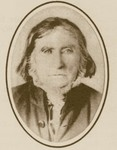
Peter Reesor

Peter Reesor (December 25, 1775 – November 16, 1854) was one of the original settlers of Markham, Ontario.

He was born on December 25, 1775, in Lancaster County, Pennsylvania, to Christian Reesor (1747–1806) and Veronica (Fanny) Reiff (1751–1818). Reesor's grandparents Peter Rieser (1713-1804) and Elizabeth Hershey had moved from Switzerland to Bavaria and then to America in 1739.

== First visit to Canada ==
At the close of the American Revolution, many pacifist Mennonites left the newly formed United States in loyalty to the British Crown which guaranteed them exemption from military service. In 1798, Peter Reesor was appointed by his family and community to travel to Upper Canada and explore newly opened lands for settlement. He saddled up a horse and packed a few things for his seven-week, 500 mile journey to York (Toronto). Upon arrival Peter was directed to travel up the Rouge River trail to an area which later became known as Cedar Grove. There was ample amount of good timberland. On his short stay here he met a mercenary German army officer, Frederic Baron de Hoen. The officer apparently offered Peter roughly 500 acres of land around a kettle lake in Whitchurch Township (Reesor Lake, later Preston Lake) in exchange for his horse and saddle. Reesor took the offer. However, when the officer wanted the bridle as well, Reesor—always a shrewd business man—stated it was not part of the original deal. According to family tradition, Peter Reesor walked back to Pennsylvania carrying the bridle on his shoulder.

== Reesor family emigration ==
In 1804, Peter Reesor led a larger group of Pennsylvania Dutch Mennonite families on the long journey to Upper Canada for settlement along the Rouge River. Peter had chosen Lot 4, on Concession 9 (five acres of land) on the Little Rouge River for his own homestead. His brother-in-law and cousin Abraham Stouffer settled further north and founded the community of Stouffville. The first task of the pioneer families was to clear large numbers of trees in preparation for farming. At the time, pioneers only had axes and hand saws to cut down the three to four foot diameter maple and pine trees. This was very dangerous work. In 1806, shortly after arriving in Canada, Christian Reesor (Peter's father) was killed by a falling tree. After a few years of tree clearing there was enough land to start farming wheat. Initially they would take their wheat and travel miles to a grist mill to be turned into flour. But Peter Reesor, like his brother-in-law Abraham Stouffer, was both a farmer and miller. Soon Reesor had built a saw mill and a grist mill on the Little Rouge River, and by 1850 he and his son Peter Jr. had acquired a third mill as well. Another son, Abraham Reesor, became a co-founder of the hamlet of Altona, where he constructed two mills in 1850. A third son, Samuel, is considered the founding minister of the Cedar Grove Mennonite Church. Daughter Esther married Captain William Armstrong, joined the Anglican Church, and together they operated a distillery and hotel in the Village of Markham and established the Markham Fair. A nephew, David Reesor, became well known as a Lieutenant-Colonel of the Reserve Militia in York (against his pacifist Mennonite tradition—he became a Methodist) and was appointed to the Senate of Canada.

== Founding a town ==
The settlement between Peter Reesor's farm and mill and his brother's farms became known as Reesorville. In 1825, Reesorville was renamed the Village of Markham to coincide with the Township of Markham.

== Death ==
Peter Reesor died November 16, 1854, at his home in Markham (11 Reesor Road), Ontario at the age of 78. Peter Reesor is buried in Cedar Grove, Ontario.
