= David Reesor =

Upper Canadian businessman

The Honourable David Reesor
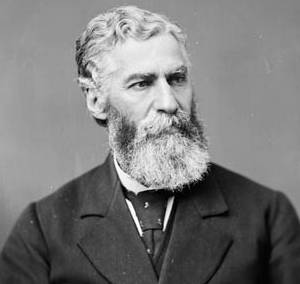

Canadian Senator from Ontario
- In office October 23, 1867 – January 1901
- Appointed by: Royal proclamation

Personal details
- Born: January 18, 1823 Markham, Upper Canada
- Died: April 27, 1902 (aged 79) Rosedale, Ontario, Canada
- Party: Liberal
- Spouse: Emily McDougall (m. 1847)
- Children: 5
- Occupation: Politician; businessman

David Reesor (January 18, 1823 – April 28, 1902) was a Canadian businessman and politician. He was a Liberal member of the Senate of Canada for King's division from 1867 to 1901.

== Background ==
He was born in Reesorville (later the Village of Markham), Upper Canada in 1823 to parents Abraham Reesor (1790–1831) and Anna Dettwiler (1787–1854), descended from Pennsylvania Dutch Mennonite immigrants who first settled in Lancaster County, Pennsylvania. David was the nephew of Abraham Stouffer, founder of Stouffville, and of Peter Reesor, co-founder of Reesorville (later Markham) and Cedar Valley.

In 1848, he married Emily McDougall, the sister of politician William McDougall.

Reesor was editor of the Markham Economist. He was also a magistrate and notary public, reeve of Markham, Ontario (1851, 1856–57 and 1859–1860) and served as warden for York and Peel counties. Though Reesor came from a pacifist Mennonite background, he became a lieutenant-colonel in the local militia. He was elected to the Legislative Council of the Province of Canada for King's division in 1860 and served until Confederation, when he was named to the Senate. During the debates preceding Confederation, Reesor supported an elected Senate. He resigned in 1901.

He died at Rosedale in north Toronto in 1902, and was buried with his wife at Mount Pleasant Cemetery, Toronto. His home at 166 Main Street North in Markham (built 1876) still stands. Senator Reesor's Drive in Markham is named in his honour.

Reesor married Emily McDougall in 1847, who was the sister to Father of Confederation William McDougall.
