= Beaver Creek (York Region) =

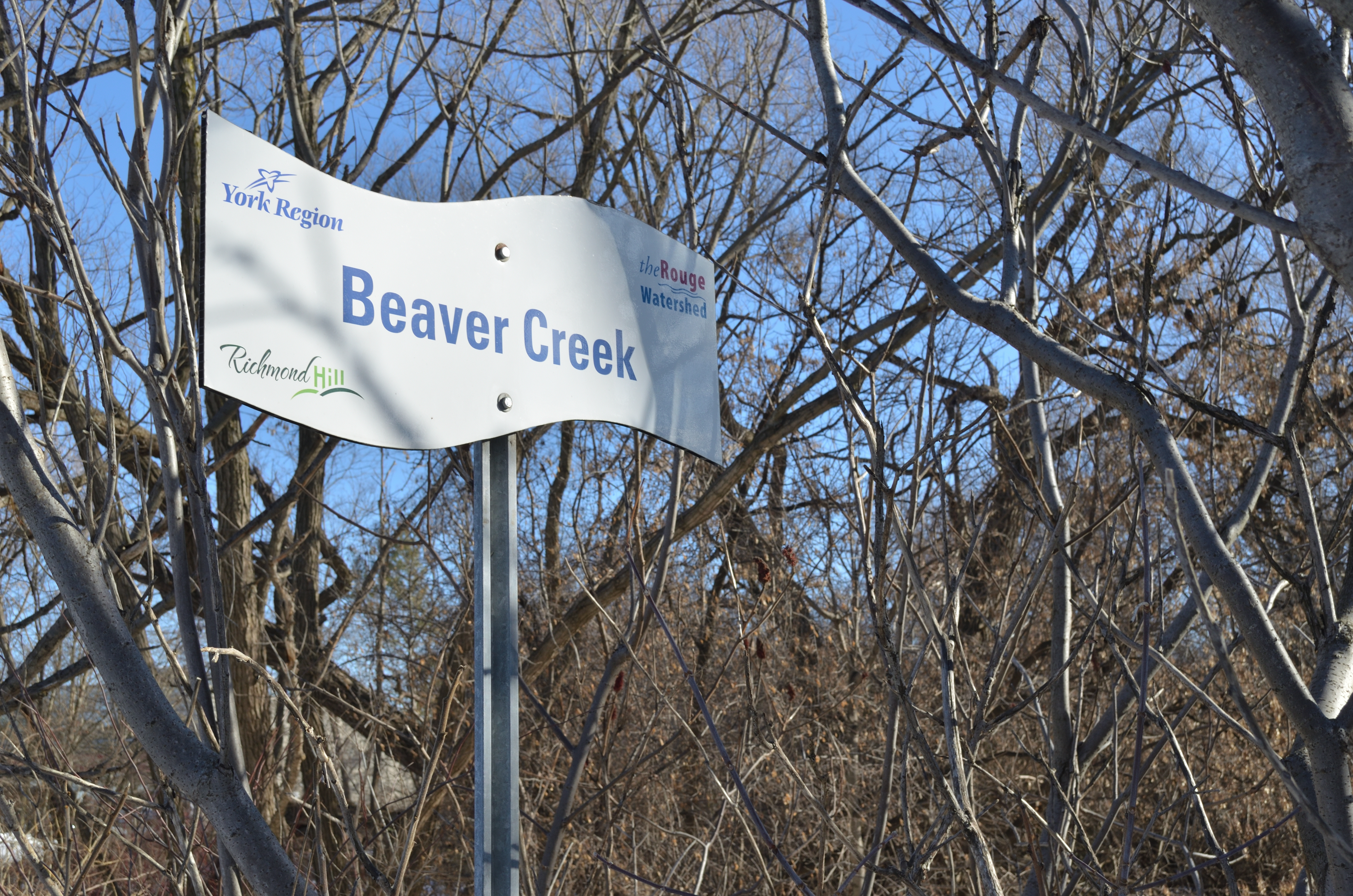
- Beaver Creek in Richmond Hill

- Location of the mouth of Beaver Creek in Southern Ontario

Location
- Country: Canada
- Province: Ontario
- Region: Greater Toronto Area
- Regional municipality: York
- Municipalities: Markham; Richmond Hill

Physical characteristics
- Source
  - location: Richmond Hill
  - coordinates: 43°52′45″N 79°24′31″W
  - elevation: 219 m (719 ft)
- Mouth: Rouge River
  - coordinates: 43°50′50″N 79°20′05″W
  - elevation: 175 m (574 ft)

Basin features
- River system: Great Lakes Basin

Beaver Creek is a river in the municipalities of Markham and Richmond Hill in the Regional Municipality of York, part of the Greater Toronto Area of Ontario, Canada. It is part of the Great Lakes Basin and is a right tributary of the Rouge River

== Hydrology ==
The source of the creek is a basin formed at the outflow of a drainage culvert in Richmond Hill. The creek flows southeast through a residential area before crossing almost directly under the intersection of Leslie Street and 16th Avenue into the eponymous Beaver Creek industrial area. The creek continues southeast into Markham, under Highway 404 and southwest of the intersection of Woodbine Avenue and Highway 7 at the community of Brown's Corners. It continues southeast to a point just north of Highway 407, before turning northeast to join the Rouge River, just southeast of the IBM Toronto Software Lab. The Rouge River flows to Lake Ontario.

== See also ==
- List of rivers of Ontario
