= Stover (disambiguation) =

Stover is the leaves and stalks of field crops.

Stover may also refer to:

== Places ==
- Stover, Missouri
- Stover, West Virginia
- Stover, Teigngrace, an historic estate in Devon, England
- Stover Canal, a canal in Devon, England
- Ralph Stover State Park, Bucks County, Pennsylvania State Park

== People ==
- Stover (surname)

== Other uses ==
- Stover at Yale, a 1912 novel by Owen Johnson
- Russell Stover Candies, a U.S. supplier of boxed candy
