= Christian Stauffer =

Christian Stauffer, born 1579 in the village of Eggiwil, Switzerland, was a leader in the Anabaptist movement during the 17th century.

== Personal life ==
Christian Stauffer was the eldest of eleven children of Niclaus Stauffer (b. abt. 1555) and Cathrinia Lehman. He was born and raised at Luchsmatt Farm in the village of Eggiwil.

Christian first married Adelheid Opplinger (born 1588) June 18, 1610 in Rothenbach, Bern, Switzerland. They had 11 children from 1611 to 1629.

== Prison and exile ==
In 1644, Christian who was an Anabaptist preacher may have been potential prey during a great "Täufer-Jagen" (Baptist Hunt) along with Uli Zaugg and Uli Neuhaus. They were all captured and placed in Thun Castle, where the authorities were warned to keep obstinate preachers out of Emmenthal valley (where Eggiwil is located). The Emmenthal valley was a hub for Anabaptists and their numbers were growing which alarmed the authorities in Bern. Authorities arrested and exiled anyone who was thought to be a follower or supporter of the Anabaptist movement.

Christian and his second wife were exiled from Eggiwil in the fall of 1671 to Dirmstein, Germany.

== Death ==
A few months after his exile, (April 6, 1672) Christian died of old age in Dirmstein, Germany. He was 93 years old.

== Descendants ==
Stauffer is connected to family members that eventually headed to the United States and Canada:

- Abraham Stouffer American born settler founder of what is now Stouffville, Ontario, Canada
