= Staufenberg =

Staufenberg may refer to:

- Staufenberg, Hesse, a town in the district of Gießen, Hesse, Germany
- Staufenberg, Lower Saxony, a municipality in the district of Göttingen, Lower Saxony, Germany
- Staufenberg (Reinhardswald), a mountain in the Reinhardswald in the district of Kassel, Hesse, Germany
- Staufenberg (Vellmar), a mountain near Vellmar in the district of Kassel, Hesse, Germany
- Staufenberg (Gernsbach), a village incorporated into the town of Gernsbach in Baden-Württemberg, Germany

== See also ==
- Stauffenberg family, German noble family
