= Brown's Corners, Markham =

Brown's Corners
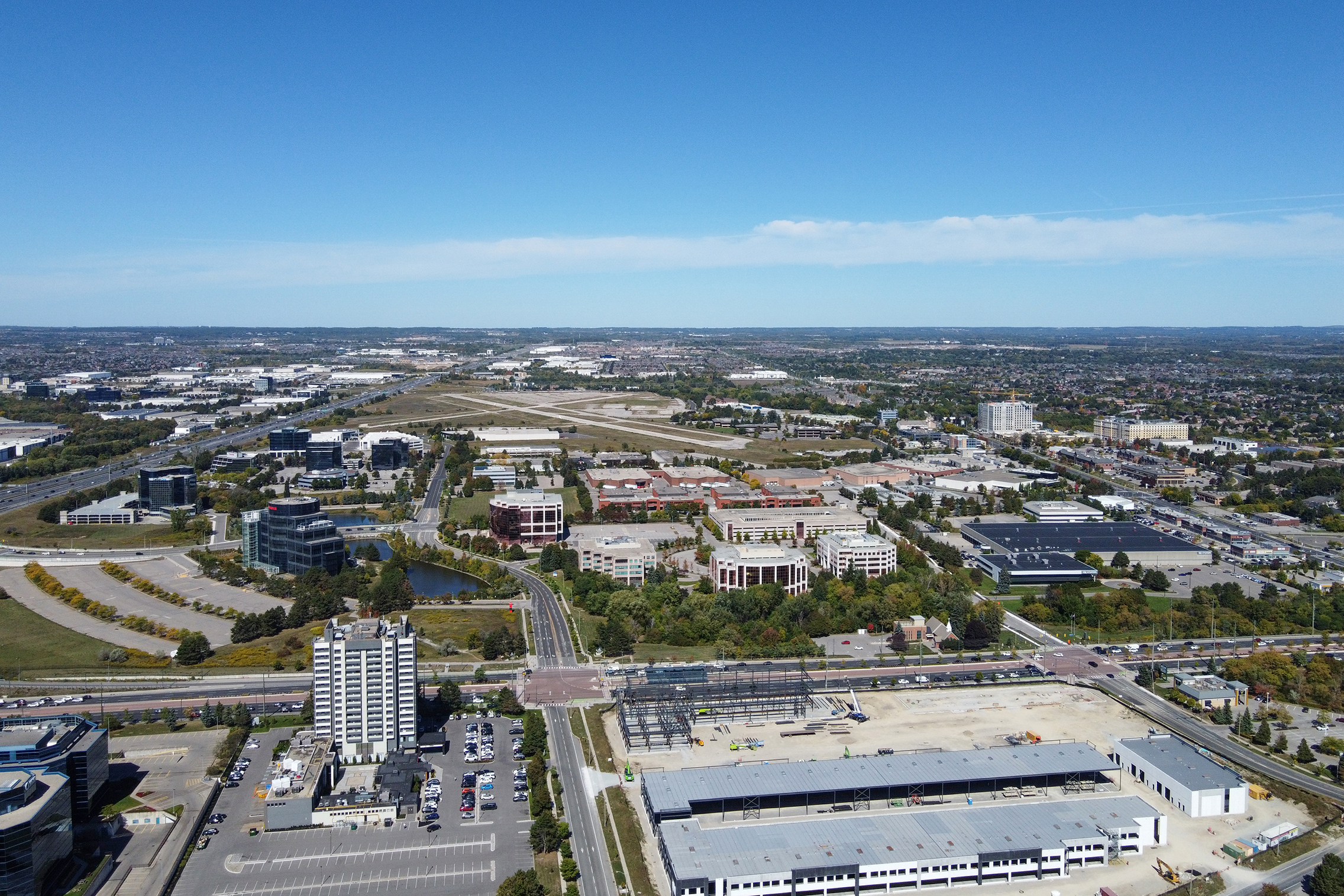
- Aerial view of Brown's Corners, Markham in 2025
- Etymology: Named for local settler Alexander Brown Sr
- Location in York Region
- Coordinates: 43°50′59″N 79°21′31″W
- Country: Canada
- Province: Ontario
- Regional Municipality: York
- Municipality: Markham
- Established: 1842
- Elevation: 181 m (594 ft)
- Time zone: UTC-5 (Eastern Time Zone)
  - Summer (DST): UTC-4 (Eastern Time Zone)
- Area codes: 905, 289, 365
- CGNDB key: FEQSV

Brown's Corners is an unincorporated community in Markham, Regional Municipality of York in the Greater Toronto Area of Ontario, Canada and located near the corner of Woodbine Avenue and Highway 7. The community, founded in 1842, was named for local settler Alexander Brown Sr. (1771–1851) who acquired 100 acres (40 ha) in 1838. Beaver Creek flows through it.

The community is mixed into another unincorporated community of Buttonville, Ontario.

== History ==
Prior to 1838, the land was known as Crown patent to Lot 11, Concession 3 and was owned by King's College, which purchased the land from the British Crown in 1828.

Following the establishment of the farming community, the area became vibrant in the 19th century and into the early 20th century. The hub of the community was Browns Presbyterian Church, with land donated by Brown and located next to his farm. The church included an adjacent cemetery. It became a United Church in 1925. The community also organized an Orange Lodge in the 1830, which continued well into the 1900s.

By the 1960s, farms began to disappear giving way to industrial and retail development in the 1970s and 1980s.

The original Brown homestead was sold in 1968 by Harvey Brown (1938–2004) to developers. The historical community has all but disappeared. A few homes north of Apple Creek Drive and the church at Frontenac Drive are all that remain of the past.

Lost heritage buildings of the community include the Galloway House 1858–1995, and Brown's Corners Inn or The Derry West Hotel c. 1877.

== New Brown's Corner ==
The area once was once farm land and has given way to commercial development. Outlet malls are now found near the former community. All that remains of the old settlement is the Brown's Corner United Church with the small cemetery and Alexander Brown House (built in 1858 by Brown's son) at 8980 Woodbine Avenue.

A list of business located in the area and on the former Brown's farm:

- Hyundai Canada
- Oracle Canada ULC (formerly Sun Microsystems)
- Michael Angelo's - located at the former Knob Hill Farms Markham Food Terminal
- Seneca College - formerly Allstate Insurance
- Toronto/Buttonville Municipal Airport
