= K.A. Tucker =

Canadian writer

- Born: Kathleen Tucker
- Website: www.katuckerbooks.com

Kathleen (K.A.) Tucker is a Canadian writer known for her romance novels.

== Career ==
Tucker worked in sales prior to her writing career. After the birth of her second child, she began writing and self-published her first books. Ten Tiny Breaths, her new adult romance novel, was self-published online in 2012. She signed with Atria Books shortly after Ten Tiny Breaths came out.

== Personal life ==
Tucker lives in Stouffville, Ontario.

== Books ==
- Ten Tiny Breaths series
  - Ten Tiny Breaths (2012)
  - One Tiny Lie (2013)
  - Four Seconds to Lose (2013)
  - Five Ways to Fall (2014)
- Burying Water series
  - Burying Water (Atria, 2014)
  - Becoming Rain (2015)
  - Chasing River (2015)
  - Surviving Ice (2015)
- The Wolf Hotel series
  - Tempt Me (2015)
  - Break Me (2016)
  - Teach Me (2016)
  - Surrender to Me (2017)
  - Own Me (2023)
- He Will Be My Ruin (2016)
- Until It Fades (Atria, 2017)
- Keep Her Safe (2018)
- The Simple Wild series
  - The Simple Wild (2018)
  - Wild at Heart (2020)
  - Forever Wild (2020)
  - Running Wild (2022)
- Say You Still Love Me (2019)
- Polson Falls series
  - The Player Next Door (2020)
  - The Hustler Next Door (2023)
- Fate & Flame series
  - A Fate of Wrath & Flame (2021)
  - A Curse of Blood & Stone (2022)
  - A Queen of Thieves & Chaos (2023)
  - A Dawn of Gods & Fury (2024)
