= Markham Economist & Sun =

Canadian newspaper

- Front page of the February 20, 2020 edition
- Type: Weekly Online newspaper (since September 15, 2023), previously Weekly printed Newspaper with Digital newspaper
- City: Markham, Ontario
- Country: Canada
- Website: www.yorkregion.com

The Markham Economist & Sun is a weekly online newspaper published Thursday, serving the city of Markham, Ontario, Canada. The Economist & Sun is one of several York Region Media Group newspapers, a division of Metroland Media Group.

== Coverage ==
The Economist & Sun is a local newspaper: it covers local news and sports, and carried real estate and classified advertising.

== History ==
In 1856, David Reesor founded the Markham Economist. Reesor sold the paper to his brother-in-law Henry Ryan Corson, who became the paper's second publisher in 1860.

The Economist's rival was the Markham Sun. The Sun was founded (or taken over) by George James Chauncey (1849-1895). Chauncey was originally from St. John's, Newfoundland, whose sister Elizabeth Emma Chancey Smallwood was married to the uncle of former Newfoundland Premier Joey Smallwood. In 1881 the Sun became the rival to Reesor's paper. The Sun was bought by the Economist in 1915, creating the Economist & Sun. Corson's son Robert J. Corson was publisher of the new paper until his death in 1930. Metroland Media Group now owns the company.

Parent company Metroland Media Group filed for protection on September 15, 2023 and will cease printing of community papers like the Economist and Sun and continue only online as part of the York Region Media.

== Operations ==
- Publisher: Dana Robbins
- Editor: Lee Ann Waterman

The paper once had offices in Markham including on Main Street in Markham Village and lastly in Buttonville (Twitter handle address at McIntosh Drive is no longer valid). The paper is based out of Metroland York Region offices in Newmarket, Ontario but editorial staff are based out of Toronto.

== See also ==
- Metroland Media Group
- List of newspapers in Canada
