= Wheler's on Main, Ontario =

Wheler's on Main
- Subcommunity within Whitchurch–Stouffville
- Location within York
- Coordinates: 43°57′56″N 79°14′18″W
- Country: Canada
- Province: Ontario
- Regional Municipality: York
- Town: Whitchurch–Stouffville
- Time zone: UTC-5 (Eastern Standard Time (EST))
  - Summer (DST): UTC-4 (Eastern Daylight Time (EDT))
- Postal Code span: L4A
- Area codes: 905, 289

Wheler's on Main is a residential development (subdivision) in the community of Stouffville and in the town of Whitchurch–Stouffville, in York Region, Ontario, Canada. It is located north of 19th Avenue, south of Stouffville Road (Main Street), west of York-Durham Line and east of Ninth Line.

The name Wheler's on Main can be found on stone plaques erected on the side and on the stone median of the road at main arterial road entrances of developed regions of the community, such as the intersection of Ninth Line and Hoover Park Drive. Between 1817 and 1824 a sawmill and gristmill were built on Duffin's Creek. These were destroyed by fire, but were rebuilt. Around the time of Abraham Stouffer's death, the mills were sold to Edward Wheler. Hence, Wheler's on Main is named after Edward Wheler, the post-owner of the two main mills of Stouffville (Formerly known as Stoufferville, named after the founder, Abraham's, family name Stouffer).

Demographically, the Wheler's on Main subdivision is the most ethnically diverse community in Whitchurch–Stouffville. The Education Quality and Accountability School Reports for 2009 show 28% of the Grade Three students at the Oscar Peterson Public School, located in the middle of this new community, first spoke a language other than English at home.

== Public transit services ==
The Wheler's on Main subdivision is supported by both of Stouffville's York Region Transit bus lines: the YRT Route#15 (Stouffville Local), and the YRT Route#9 (9th Line).
