= 10,000 Trees for the Rouge Valley =

10,000 Trees for the Rouge Valley is a 100% volunteer-run environmental tree-planting organization that has held many Toronto-area tree plantings. It is a volunteer group that is dedicated to helping the environment, as it has restored more than 100 acres (0.40 km^{2}) of fragile land in the Rouge Watershed with the assistance of individuals, families, governments and community groups, since 1990. The species of trees are carefully chosen to attract and support wildlife, stabilize the soil, and improve the air and water quality. In addition, the organisation tries to protect creeks and streams from soil erosion, and it has been able to link areas of forest and extend wildlife corridors.

The tree plantings are intended to restore the Rouge River's watershed to natural cover, protect creeks and streams from soil erosion, help to link existing islands of forest and extend wildlife corridors. It was formed in 1989 as an offshoot of the Save the Rouge Valley group and the Rouge Valley Foundation, which it is still attached to. Some of the volunteers are high school students who are required to accumulate a certain number of volunteering hours before they can graduate.

== A World of Opportunity for Forest and Landscape Restoration ==
The IUCN secretariat has published a map depicting forest and landscape restoration opportunities and recent deforestation. A map of suburban sprawl areas built after 1945 is also available.
