= Ethelbert Stauffer =

German Protestant theologian and numismatist

Ethelbert Stauffer (May 8, 1902 in Friedelsheim – August 1, 1979 in Erlangen) was a German Protestant theologian and numismatist.

== Life ==
Stauffer was the son of a Mennonite preacher born and raised in Worms. After attending the local grammar school, he studied Protestant theology at the universities of Halle, Berlin and Tübingen from 1921 to 1925. He then entered the service of the Mennonite churches in Hamburg and Altona. He converted to the Evangelical Church in 1928, and became assistant pastor of the Provincial-Saxon church. The New Testament scholar Ernst von Dobschütz appointed him the faculty assistant in Halle, where he graduated in 1929. He became a lecturer there in 1930.

In the 1930s Stauffer was appointed professor of New Testament Studies and director of Ancient History Studies at the University of Bonn. Although he never joined the Nazi Party, he was a long-time and leading proponent of the "German Christian" movement, which attempted to align German Protestantism with the Party's antisemitic and Führerprinzip ideological principles, and he has frequently been accused of "Nazi activities." Stauffer argued that it was the duty of the theological faculty to promote a relationship of trust between the church and state and "called on the theological faculties not to engage in politics, but to strengthen, through their theological work, the politische Spannkraft (political vigor) of the German Volk; the unity of the German Volk cannot exist without Jesus Christ, he wrote." He also promoted physical education as part of a theological education. One of Stauffer's early contributions to the movement was his 1933 publication Unser Glaube und unsere Geschichte: Zur Begegnung zwischen Kreuz und Hakenkreuz ("Our Faith and Our History: Towards a Meeting of the Cross and the Swastika"). His relationship with the Nazi state became ambivalent, and he was removed from his post as vice-dean of the faculty of Bonn University in January 1943 for anti-fascist statements in a lecture on "Anthony and Cleopatra."

After the war Stauffer, like many academics with training in Jewish texts but with compromised war-time records, escaped close scrutiny by the Allied authorities on "the naive assumption among Allied authorities… that those who had expertise in rabbinical texts must have been sympathetic to Judaism, or at least uninvolved in Nazi activities." He was elected Dean of the Faculty of Protestant Theology at Bonn University but resigned at the first meeting of the faculty on June 5 1946, prompted by questions about his wartime activities. Although vindicated by a review of his writings, he advised the rector on 8 December 1947 that he would accept an offer from Erlangen University to take up the newly-created chair of New Testament Studies. In 1957 he admitted the anti-semitic ideas of the German Christians by stating: "The primary role of Jesus research is clear: De-Judaizing the Jesus tradition." Stauffer became professor emeritus in 1967.

Stauffer had two daughters and two sons. His third child followed him in his theological career. His son Dietrich became a Professor of Theoretical Physics at the University of Cologne.

== Studies ==
=== Early Christianity ===
He undertook much research into the relationship between the Roman sources and early Christianity. He showed that the Easter liturgy does not follow the Gospel but the funerary ritual of Julius Caesar and that the Clementia Caesaris was the pre-Christian forerunner of Christ's forgiveness.

=== Universalism ===
Stauffer was a Christian universalist, believing that ultimately all people would be saved. He believed that God's irresistible grace and will are destined to overcome even the most obdurate opposition. He also taught that divine punishment after death was real, but that it was not arbitrary or vindictive, but remedial and limited as to duration, essentially Purgatory.

=== Martyrdom in Christian theology ===
In 1933, Stauffer put forth a thesis regarding the role of martyrdom in Christian theology (specifically Anabaptist theology).

According to Stauffer, in the period of post-canonical Judaism (since about 175 B.C.) a new viewpoint impressed itself on the then flourishing apocryphal literature: the idea that suffering and martyrdom for one's faith are the very meaning of the happenings of history, for a double reason: (a) they represent a causal necessity in the great fight between the divine and the satanic order. The great Adversary does not allow a pure realization of God's plan, at least not in this present aeon or world period. (b) Such suffering, however, serves at the same time a very great purpose: it ushers in the new aeon. Death becomes victory, martyrdom is an expiating sacrifice, and Satan will be overcome only by such nonresistant suffering. That was the teaching of Daniel 3 (the three men in the furnace) and of the Second and Third Book of the Maccabees (e.g., the story of the mother and her seven sons). In short, the apocalyptic, pre-Christian literature offers this double justification of martyrdom: causally it is inescapable, and teleologically ("what for") it is absolutely meaningful.

The New Testament continued this apocalyptic trend even further; the Cross becoming the very center not only of salvation but also the vindication of all martyrdom for conscience' sake. In fact the idea of Nachfolge or discipleship would almost be without meaning if it were not connected with such earthly tribulations. The believer's conflict with the "world" is the surest indication that the disciple is true to the master, testifying for another reality and preparing for the coming of the kingdom. Two figures of speech soon became generally accepted: the disciple must become a "soldier" [occasionally also called a "knight"] of Christ who "fights the good fight" to the bitter end, and secondly, baptism is called death just as death is a sort of baptism by blood.

== Bibliography ==
- Christus und die Caesaren, Hamburg 1952
- Christ and the Caesars. Historical sketches (translated by Kaethe Gregor Smith and Ronald Gregor Smith). London: SCM-Press, 1955
- Jerusalem und Rom im Zeitalter Jesu Christi, Bern 1957
- Jesus: Gestalt und Geschichte, 1957
- New Testament Theology, 1963
