= Cedar Grove, Ontario =

Cedar Grove
- Unincorporated community
- Interactive map of Cedar Grove
- Coordinates: 43°51′28″N 79°12′13″W
- Country: Canada
- Province: Ontario
- Regional municipality: York
- City: Markham
- Established: 1832
- Elevation: 177 m (581 ft)
- Time zone: UTC-5 (EST)
  - Summer (DST): UTC-4 (EDT)
- Area codes: 905 and 289
- NTS Map: 030M14
- GNBC Code: FAPKR

Cedar Grove is a community in Markham, Ontario, on the Little Rouge River. It is centred on 14th Avenue and Reesor Road (10th Line) and within the boundaries of the future national Rouge Park.

== History ==
James Osborne of North Carolina, with wife and children, first settled in the Cedar Grove area in the late eighteenth century. In 1804, Mennonite settlers from Pennsylvania (sometimes called the Pennsylvania Dutch) arrived in Cedar Grove, headed by Peter Reesor, who first scouted the area for his community in the 1790s. Reesor bought the Osborne lot (lot 4, conc. 9) and performed the settlement duties for the original grantee in 1804; he then acquired lot 5 in 1805. The stone house on the Reesor homestead was built in 1832.

By 1820, John Eby Reesor helped to construct a log building at the corner of Steeles Ave. and 11th Line to serve as both a school and a church, for Mennonites and Presbyterians. About 1850, a frame school building was constructed on the north side of 14th Ave., east of 10th Line to accommodate the growing community. The old school house is now Cedar Grove Community Centre. In 1869, this building was replaced by a red brick school across the south side of 14th Ave. "Cedar Grove school was unique ... in having a gallery where in winter any adult could come and get a bit of learning by listening to the classes below."

By 1878, the hamlet also had four mills, a post office and general store, tavern and inn, and blacksmith shop (now at the Markham Museum and Historical Village). A Mennonite Meeting House was built on lot 4, conc. 9 in 1867, although the grounds were used as a cemetery (now Rouge Valley Mennonite Church Cemetery) as early as 1824. The Zion Presbyterian Church constructed a frame-building on the 11th Line near Steeles in 1856, which was replaced by a stone building (now Heritage United Church) in 1890.

Today Cedar Grove is best known as the home of Cedarena, an outdoor skating facility built in 1927 on grass area on the south bank of the Rouge River. Once one of the largest rinks in the province (olympic size), the historical rink eas last opened in 2014 and signage since removed.

== Little Rouge Valley Vine ==
The Little Rouge Valley Vine, or "Great Vine", is the largest natural vine in the Ontario mixed forests. Situated next to the Little Rouge River in the heart of the valley, the "Great Vine" is over 30 cm in diameter at the base and is estimated to have runners which, together, stretch over 1 km.

In 2009, botanists from the University of Toronto attempted to locate and study the magnificent specimen. However, they were purposefully misguided by a local native wielding a buck knife in order to protect the longevity and importance of the vine. Due to the local population's efforts to keep the vine secret, very few outsiders have ever witnessed its beauty.

== Rouge National Park ==
While much of the city of Markham immediately west of Cedar Grove has become residential (as part of Box Grove, Ontario), the land immediately around Cedar Grove is still in agricultural use. In 2011 the Canadian Federal Government announced plans to create a national Rouge Park. The park will completely encompass the community of Cedar Grove.

The Little Rouge River which flows through Cedar Grove is a tributary of the Rouge River, with water flowing south from the Oak Ridges Moraine to Lake Ontario.

== Cedar Grove Community Centre ==
Cedar Grove Community Centre is a small city owned facility housed in the former Cedar Grove Schoolhouse (S.S. #20) built in 1869 serving the Mennonite community in the area.
