= Devin Stauffer =

American philosopher (born 1970)

- Born: 1970 (age 55–56)
- Awards: Carl Friedrich von Siemens Foundation fellowship

Education
- Education: Boston College (PhD)
- Doctoral advisor: Christopher Bruell

Philosophical work
- Era: 21st-century philosophy
- Region: Western philosophy
- Institutions: University of Texas at Austin, Kenyon College, St. John's College in Annapolis
- Main interests: ancient Greek philosophy, political philosophy

Devin Stauffer (born 1970) is an American philosopher and Professor of Political Science at the University of Texas at Austin. Previously he taught at Kenyon College and St. John's College in Annapolis. Stauffer is known for his works on classical and early modern political thought.

== Books ==
- Plato's Introduction to the Question of Justice (SUNY, 2001)
- The Unity of Plato's Gorgias (Cambridge, 2006)
- Hobbes's Kingdom of Light (Chicago, 2018)
