= Altona, Ontario =

Coordinates: 43°58′35″N 79°11′48″W

Altona
- Unincorporated community
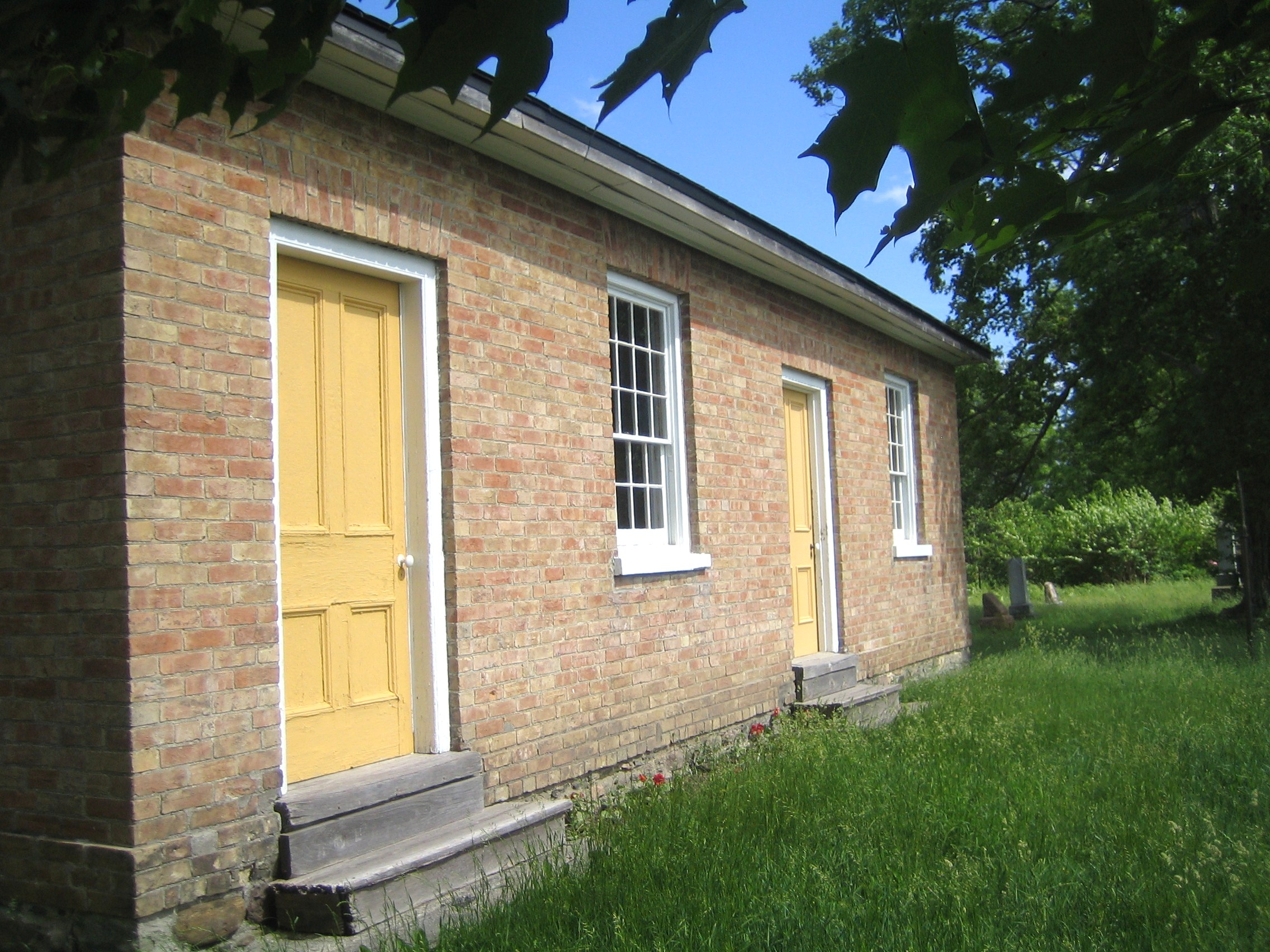
- Altona Mennonite Meeting House, 1852
- Interactive map of Altona
- Country: Canada
- Province: Ontario
- Regional municipality: Durham Region
- Town: Pickering, Ontario
- Elevation: 267 m (876 ft)
- Time zone: UTC−5 (EST)
  - Summer (DST): UTC−4 (EDT)

Altona is a ghost town located in Pickering, Ontario, at Sideline 30 and the Pickering-Uxbridge Town Line. It is just east of Whitchurch-Stouffville, and was named after Altona, now a borough of Hamburg, Germany.

== History ==
Reesor Mills Altona, Ontario

It was founded by ethnic Swiss-German Mennonites who had migrated from Pennsylvania in the United States. The first flour and saw mills in Altona were built by Abraham Reesor, son of Peter Reesor and a nephew to Abraham Stouffer, in 1850, on Lot 30, Concession 9, a short distance south of the Uxbridge-Pickering Townline. In the same year, Joseph Monkhouse built a general store and William Cooper an inn.

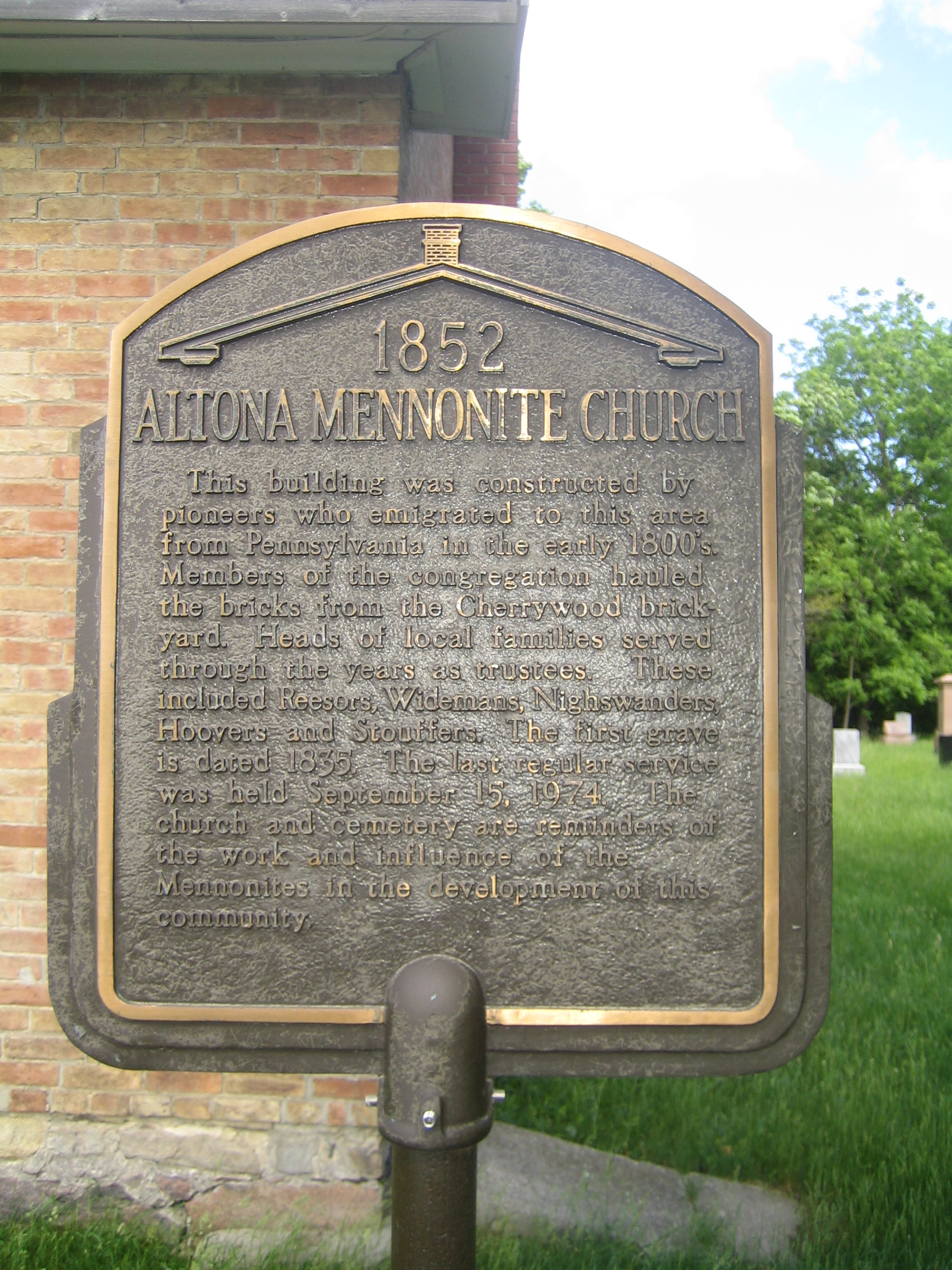
Altona Mennonite Church Plaque

In 1852, the Altona Mennonite Meeting House (5475 Sideline 30, Pickering) was erected, constructed by area Mennonite settlers. The bricks were made at the Cherrywood brick yard. Local families included the Barkeys, Reesors, Widemans, Nighswanders, Hoovers and Stouffers. The first grave is dated 1835. The founder of Stouffville, Abraham Stouffer and his wife Elizabeth Reesor Stouffer, are buried here.

The first schoolhouse was built in 1834; in 1856 there were 256 inhabitants, "unable to read and write, about 30%." By 1869 the hamlet had 200 residents and a regular stage coach to Stouffville and Toronto. In 1910 there was still a daily stage to Stouffville, but Altona's population had fallen to only 100 people.

The churches, school, store (former hotel) and many homes remained into the 21st century, but all have been expropriated and most boarded up by the federal government for a proposed plan to build Pickering airport, a second international airport in the Greater Toronto Area. One of the few remaining houses is the "Old Barkey Home", built in 1856 by the Mennonite farmer and preacher Daniel Barkey. Under the current plan, the approach for one of the three landing strips for the Pickering Airport would be directly over the former hamlet of Altona, with planes descending at an elevation of approximately 300 metres. The plan anticipates 11.9 million passengers per year (or 32,600 per day) by 2032. A "Needs Assessment Study" was completed by the Greater Toronto Airports Authority for the federal government in May 2010. After a "due diligence review," Transport Canada released the report in July 2011.
