= Dietrich Stauffer =

German physicist (1943–2019)

- Born: 6 February 1943; Bonn, Germany
- Died: 6 August 2019 (aged 76)
- Known for: Percolation theory
- Awards: Gay-Lussac–Humboldt Prize (1992)
- Scientific career
- Fields: Physics
- Workplaces: University of Cologne

Dietrich Stauffer (6 February 1943 – 6 August 2019) was a German professor of theoretical physics at the University of Cologne. He is known in particular for his work on percolation theory, cellular automata and computational physics.

== Life and work ==
Stauffer was born in Bonn in 1943, one of the four children of theologian Ethelbert Stauffer. He studied physics in Munich, gaining a PhD in 1970 with a thesis on phase transitions and the superfluidity of helium. He then did post-doctoral work in the United States on phase transitions and nucleation before returning to Germany to work with Kurt Binder at Saarland University. In 1975 he became eligible for a professorship on completion of his habilitation. Two years later he was appointed associate professor of theoretical physics at the University of Cologne, where he remained for the rest of his career.

During the 1970s Stauffer carried out research on percolation theory, publishing a review in Physics Reports in 1979, followed by a book An introduction to percolation theory in 1985, which would become his most-cited work. An expanded version, co-authored with Amnon Aharony, came out in 1992. In 1989 he was one of the founding directors of the supercomputer centre set up at the Forschungszentrum Jülich, where one of his main areas of research was cellular automata. In the 1990s he pioneered econophysics and sociophysics, publishing the book Evolution, Money, War and Computers with Brazilian colleagues.

Stauffer published 620 articles and six books, as well as editing the Annual Reviews of Computational Physics and serving as a member of the editorial board of a number of journals. He was a visiting professor at several universities including St. Francis Xavier University in Canada, and universities in Niterói, Brazil, and Paris and Marseille in France. Awards included the Gay-Lussac–Humboldt Prize (1992) and the Gentner-Kastler prize (1999). Following his retirement in 2008, Stauffer pursued an interest in history, attending lectures at the University of Cologne. He died in August 2019.
