= Staufenberg (Vellmar) =

Mountain in Germany

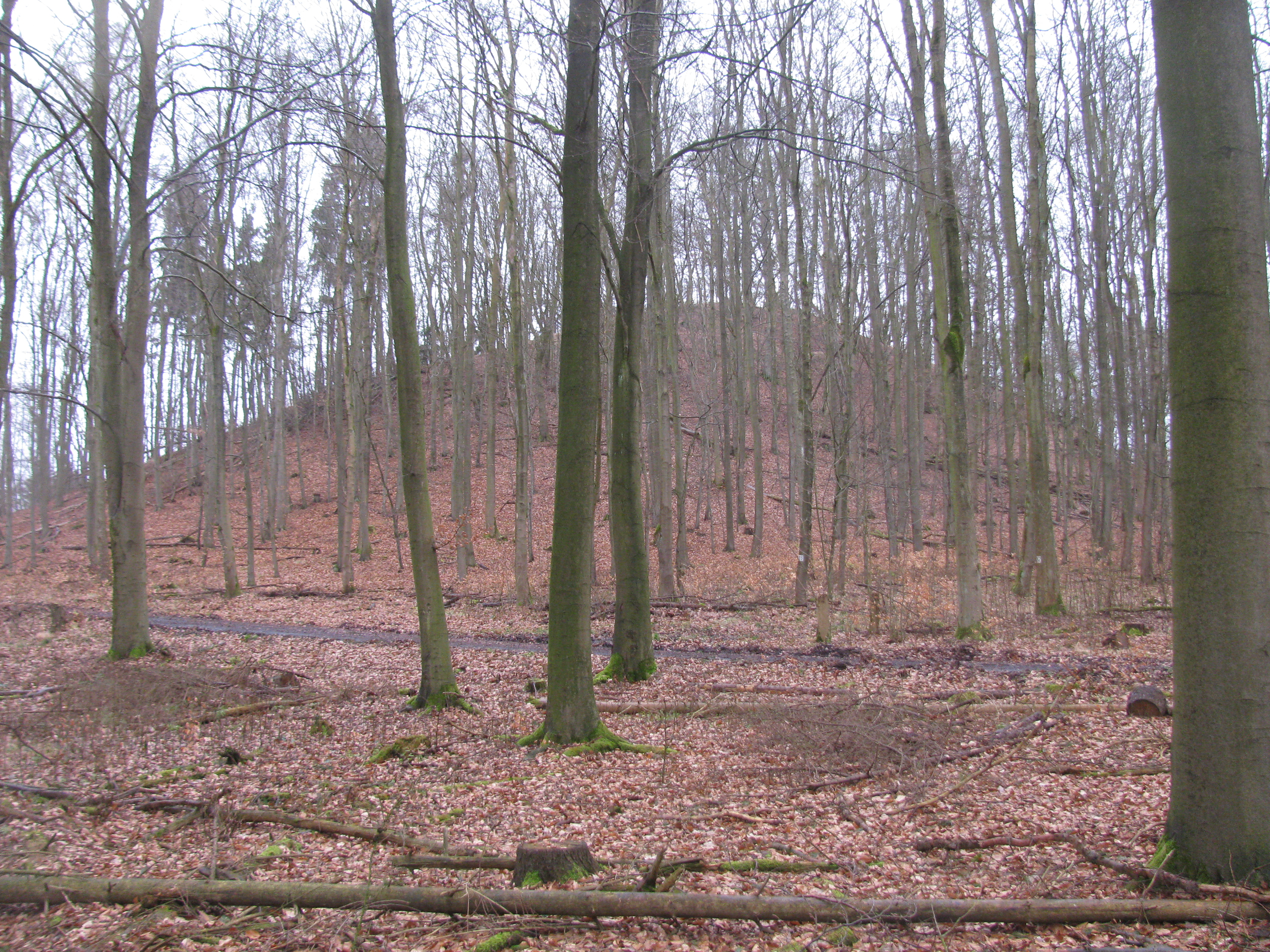
- Staufenberg summit.

Highest point
- Elevation: 361.2 m above sea level (NN) (1,185 ft)
- Coordinates: 51°13′26″N 9°15′20″E

Geography
- Location within Hesse
- Location: Kassel, Hesse, Germany

The Staufenberg (German pronunciation: [ˈʃtaʊfn̩ˌbɛʁk]) is a mountain near Vellmar in Kassel, Hesse, Germany.
