= Stover, West Virginia =

Stover
- Unincorporated community
- Location within the state of West Virginia Stover (the United States)
- Coordinates: 37°48′51″N 81°21′14″W
- Country: United States
- State: West Virginia
- County: Raleigh
- Elevation: 1,736 ft (529 m)
- Time zone: UTC-5 (Eastern (EST))
  - Summer (DST): UTC-4 (EDT)
- GNIS ID: 1547526

Stover is an unincorporated community in Raleigh County, West Virginia, United States.
