= Abraham Stouffer =

Canadian farmer (1781–1851)

Abraham Stouffer

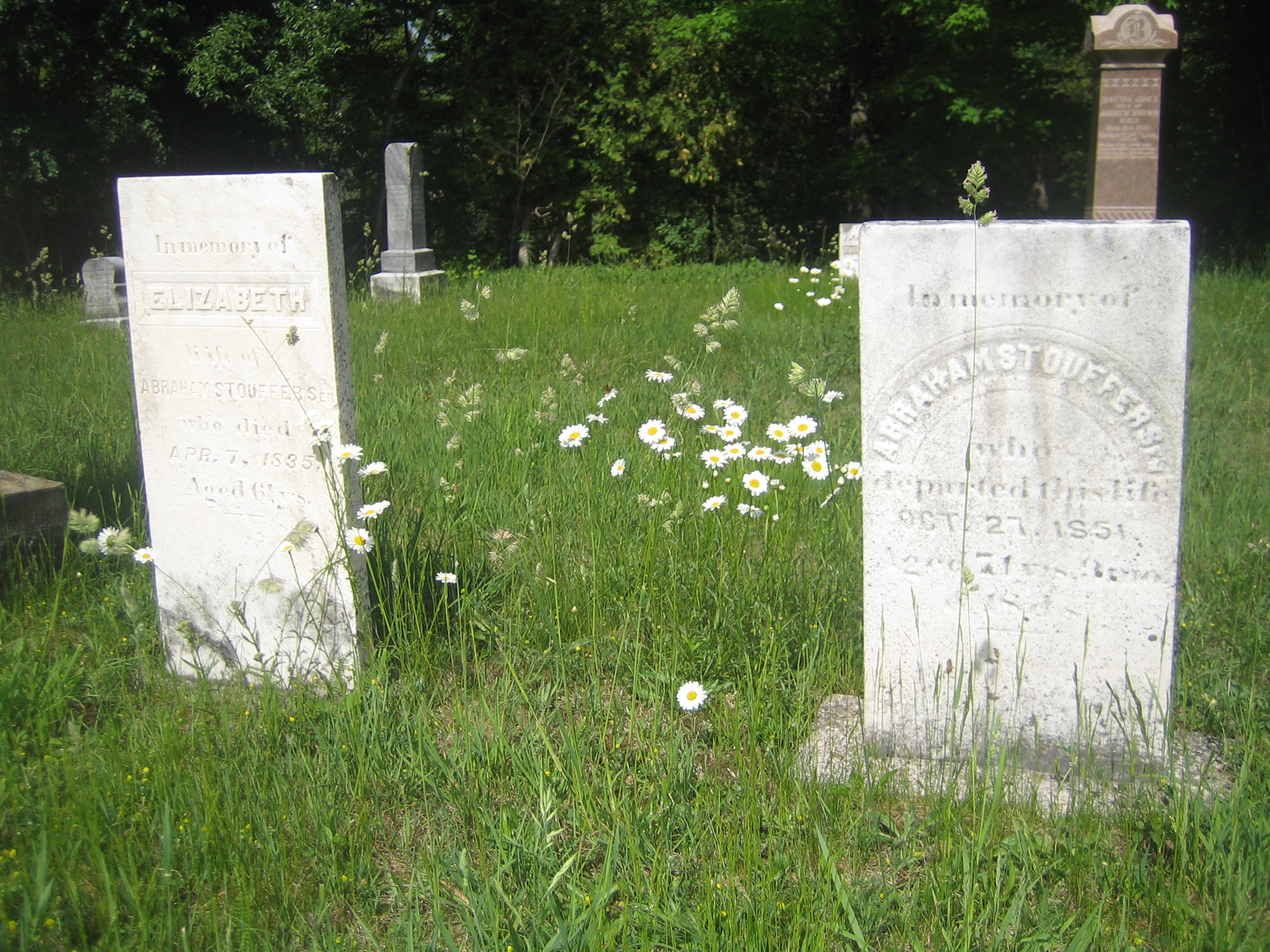
Gravestones for Elizabeth Stouffer and Abraham Stouffer, located in Altona, Ontario

Abraham Stouffer (January 8, 1781 – October 27, 1851) is the founder of the town of Stouffville, Ontario.

== Background and early years in the United States, 1781-1804 ==
Abraham Stouffer was born January 8, 1781, near Chambersburg, Lancaster County, Pennsylvania, to Abraham Stauffer (1747–1809) and Barbara Hershey (1750–1795). Abraham was a descendant of Christian Stauffer (1579–1671), a fugitive "obstinate" Anabaptist (Mennonite) preacher in Switzerland.

== Immigration to Upper Canada, and the founding "Stoufferville", 1803-1805 ==
In October 1804, Abraham Stouffer emigrated to Upper Canada from Pennsylvania with his wife's family, the Reesors. Their entourage of five Conestoga wagons reached Markham Township after a six-week journey. The information on Stouffer's Affirmation of Allegiance states: "farmer, hazel eyes, brown hair, six feet one inch high, born in Pennsylvania, 28 years old, a Menonist." Abraham and his wife Elizabeth initially settled north of Cedar Grove on the Little Rouge River, but soon acquired 400 acres of land on the Markham-Whitchurch Township Line. In 1805, Stouffer purchased Lots 1 and 2, Concession 9, on the Whitchurch side of the township line, and soon after he acquired lot 35 on the Markham side. Stouffer, who had learned milling from his father, built a saw and a grist mills on Duffin's Creek (near what is today Mill and Main Streets), and a village soon developed around the mills. The settlement became known as "Stoufferville".

== Leading figure in Stouffville ==
Abraham Stouffer was a leading figure in the larger community. In 1825, he became a director of the Farmers' Storehouse Company, an enterprise of millers formed to counter the power of the York merchants. In 1832, when a post office was established, the name of the village was shortened from "Stoufferville" to Stouffville. Stouffer was also one of the first trustees of the Altona Mennonite Meeting House.

== Death ==
Abraham Stouffer died October 27, 1851, and is buried at the Altona Mennonite Meeting House

== Stouffer family coat of arms, and the Town of Whitchurch-Stouffville ==
Today, the coat of arms of the Town of Whitchurch–Stouffville includes a star and chalice which come from the Stouffer family (Swiss) coat of arms.
