= Stauffer syndrome =

- Specialty: Hepatology

Stauffer syndrome is a constellation of signs and symptoms of liver dysfunction that arises due to presence of renal cell carcinoma, and, more rarely, in connection with other malignant neoplasms, though the specific pathogenesis is currently unknown. The hepatic abnormalities are not due to tumor infiltration of the liver or intrinsic liver disease; they instead reflect the presence of a paraneoplastic syndrome.

Stauffer syndrome causes abnormal liver function tests, especially those that reflect the presence of cholestasis, i.e. abnormal bile flow. Hepatosplenomegaly may also be observed. The symptoms and signs resolve if the renal cell carcinoma (or another associated tumor) is successfully ablated. It is due to release of IL-6 from cancerous cell.

The syndrome is named for Dr. Maurice H. Stauffer, a gastroenterologist at the Mayo Clinic in Rochester, Minnesota. Stauffer first characterized the syndrome in 1961, with the original name of "nephrogenic hepatomegaly".
