= Rouge River (Ontario) =

River in Ontario, Canada

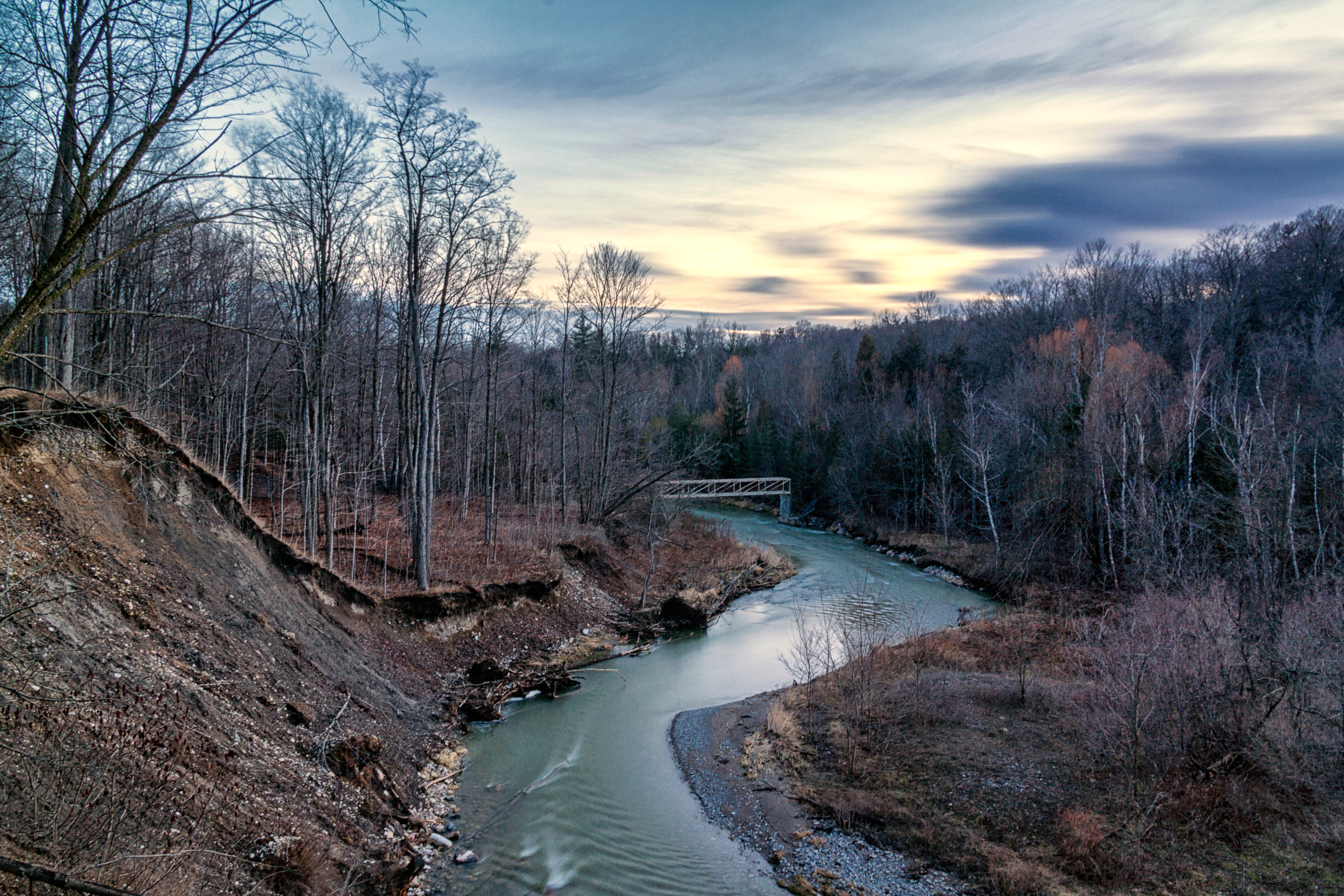
- The Rouge River and Valley viewed from the Finch Meander Trail

- Location of the mouth of the Rouge River in Toronto
- Native name: Gichi-ziibiins (Ojibwe)

Location
- Country: Canada
- Province: Ontario
- Region: Greater Toronto Area
- Municipalities: Toronto; Pickering; Markham; Richmond Hill

Physical characteristics
- Source
  - location: Richmond Hill
  - coordinates: 43°56′33″N 79°25′05″W
  - elevation: 306 m (1,004 ft)
- Mouth: Lake Ontario
  - location: West Rouge, Toronto
  - coordinates: 43°47′41″N 79°06′55″W
  - elevation: 74 m (243 ft)
- Basin size: 336 km^{2} (130 sq mi)
- Discharge
  - average: 1.76 m^{3}/s (62 cu ft/s)
  - minimum: 0.45 m^{3}/s (16 cu ft/s)
  - maximum: 5.98 m^{3}/s (211 cu ft/s)

Basin features
- River system: Great Lakes Basin
- Tributaries
  - left: Little Rouge River
  - right: Little Rouge Creek, Katabokokonk Creek, Bruce Creek, Beaver Creek

The Rouge River is a river in Markham, Pickering, Richmond Hill and Toronto in the Greater Toronto Area of Ontario, Canada. The river flows from the Oak Ridges Moraine to Lake Ontario at the eastern border of Toronto, and is the location of Rouge Park, the only national park in Canada within a municipality. At its southern end, the Rouge River is the boundary between Toronto and southwestern Pickering in the Regional Municipality of Durham.

== History ==
The Rouge River is part of the Carolinian life zone that is found in Southern Ontario. After the eradication of both the Petun and the Wyandot (Huron), Senecas from New York attempted to establish/expand their fur trade activities by establishing a village named Gandechiagaiagon (recorded variously as "Gandatsekiagon", "Ganatsekwyagon", "Gandatchekiagon", or "Katabokokonk"), meaning "sand-cut" at the mouth of Rouge River. According to a 1796 list by English surveyor Augustus Jones, the Mississauga name for the river was Gichi-ziibiins (recorded as "Che-sippi"), meaning "large creek." The river's name likely is French for "red river", based on the mappings by French explorer Louis Jolliet.

In the early 19th century, pioneer settlers could spear large salmon spawning as far north as the upper tributaries of the Rouge in what is today Whitchurch-Stouffville

In the former City of Scarborough, the Rouge was the "third rail" issue of municipal politics, and many minor candidates for mayor often ran on a platform to preserve it. However, since Scarborough was annexed into the City of Toronto, Toronto City Council has voted on occasion to allow development around the river. A plan to build condominiums and townhouses across from the Rouge in Pickering in 2000 was shut down due to threat to native species. For much of the course of the system in Toronto is still parkland or farmland.

As for the York Region sections, the southern watershed runs through residential areas (south of Major Mackenzie Drive and west of Markham Road) and is lined with a few small municipal parks. The source of the system is either natural or farmland.

Currently, there is a degree of abandonment in the area, of former farmlands, and historic houses. There also remain many historic houses which are still lived in, some even farmed. Research on Toronto's website listing its holdings of historic properties reveals over 20 historic buildings in the area, including Hillside Public School, Scarborough's first schoolhouse, which sits across the street from a house built by the Pearse family in 1855.

== Geography ==
=== Watershed ===
The Rouge River begins in the Oak Ridges Moraine in Richmond Hill and flows past: Markham, northwest, central, to the south, including a couple of conservation areas, the eastern edge of Scarborough and Rouge Valley Park. The watershed of the Rouge River is located in the municipalities of Richmond Hill and Markham in the Regional Municipality of York; Pickering in the Regional Municipality of Durham; and Toronto.

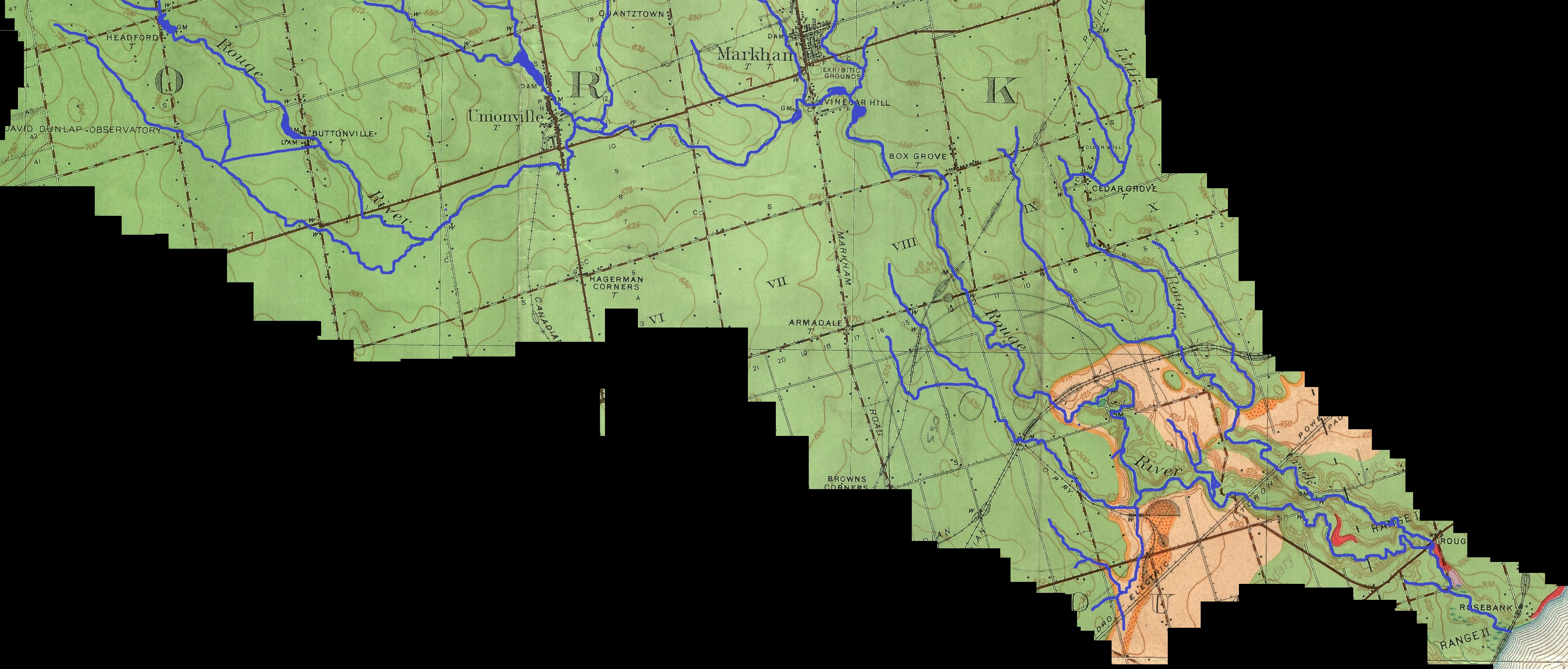
Lower course of the Rouge River, circa 1932

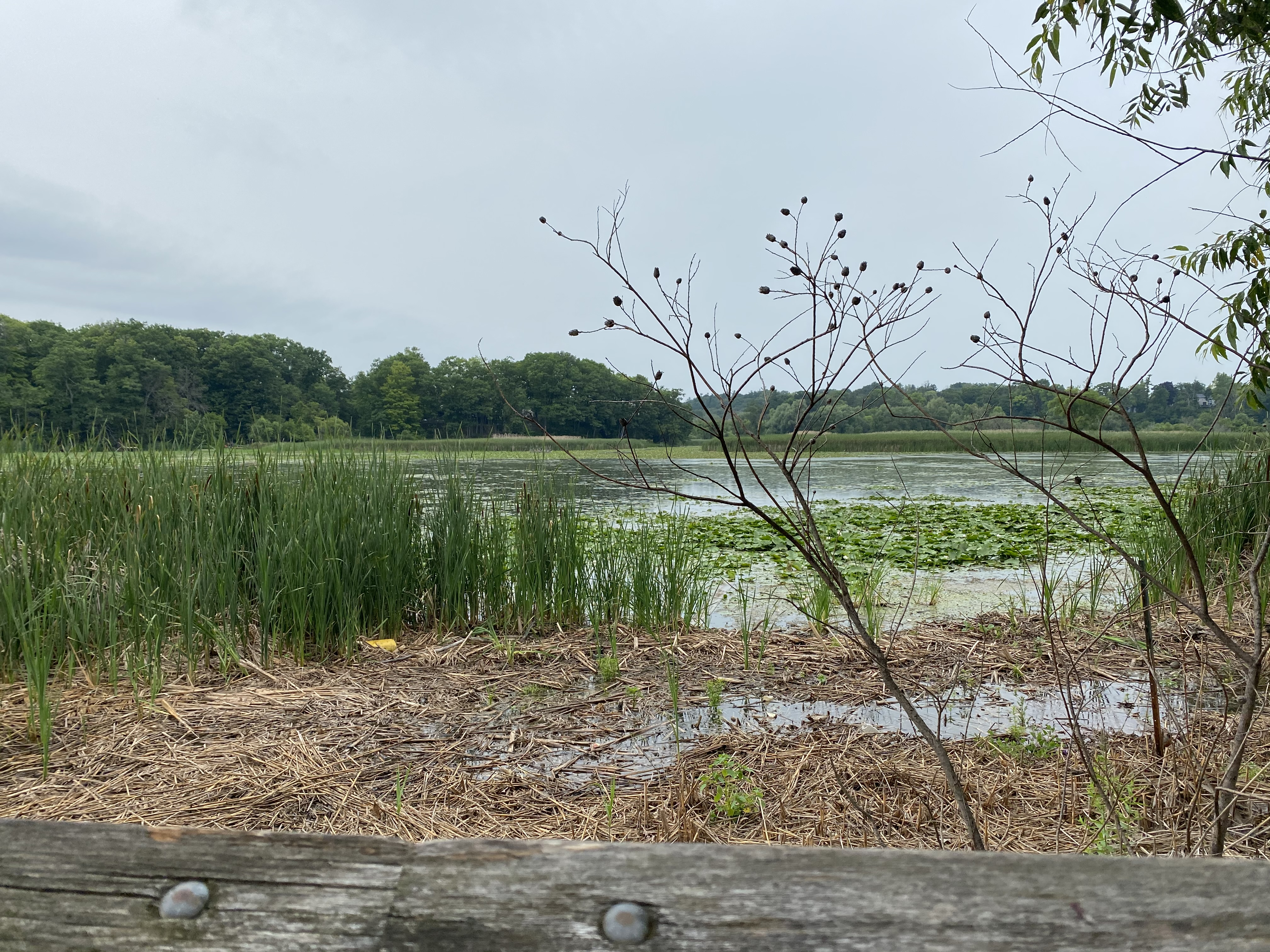
Marshes located near the estuary

Tributaries of the Rouge River also extend into the municipalities of Aurora and Whitchurch-Stouffville in the Regional Municipality of York. The total area of the watershed is 336 square kilometres (130 sq mi), of which 40% is agricultural land, 35% urban, 24% forest/wetland/meadow and 1% watercourses/waterbodies.

The headwaters of the Rouge River and its tributaries are found in the Oak Ridges Moraine. Water flows down from the elevated moraine to Lake Ontario.

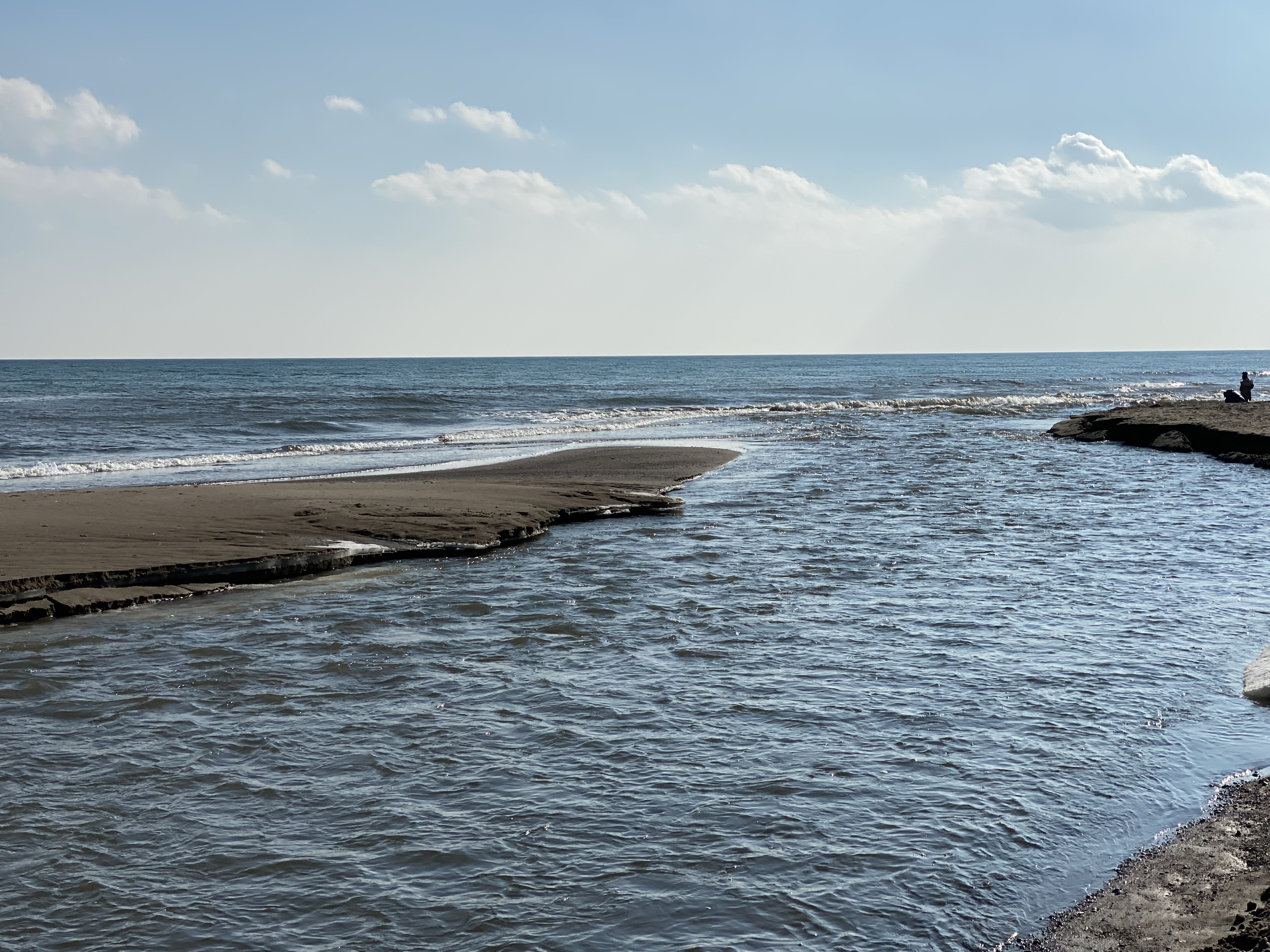
The estuary of the Rouge River

The Rouge River meets Lake Ontario at Rouge Beach. At Rouge Beach, the Rouge Marsh is to the north and Lake Ontario to the south. More than half the remaining wetlands in the Greater Toronto Area are located here in the southern Rouge River.

It is one of a few wilderness areas left in South-Central Ontario and has been virtually untouched by development since the arrival of Europeans. While many exclusive homes and conclaves border this area on the southern tip, it is currently surrounded largely by agricultural land. It is even devoid of recreational development but sports a considerable network of walking or bicycle paths. Unlike other rivers in the Toronto area, it is allowed to fill its entire flood plain on a regular basis rather than being forced through an artificial channel. However, parts of its watershed include the Toronto Zoo and the Beare Road Landfill.

=== Tributaries ===
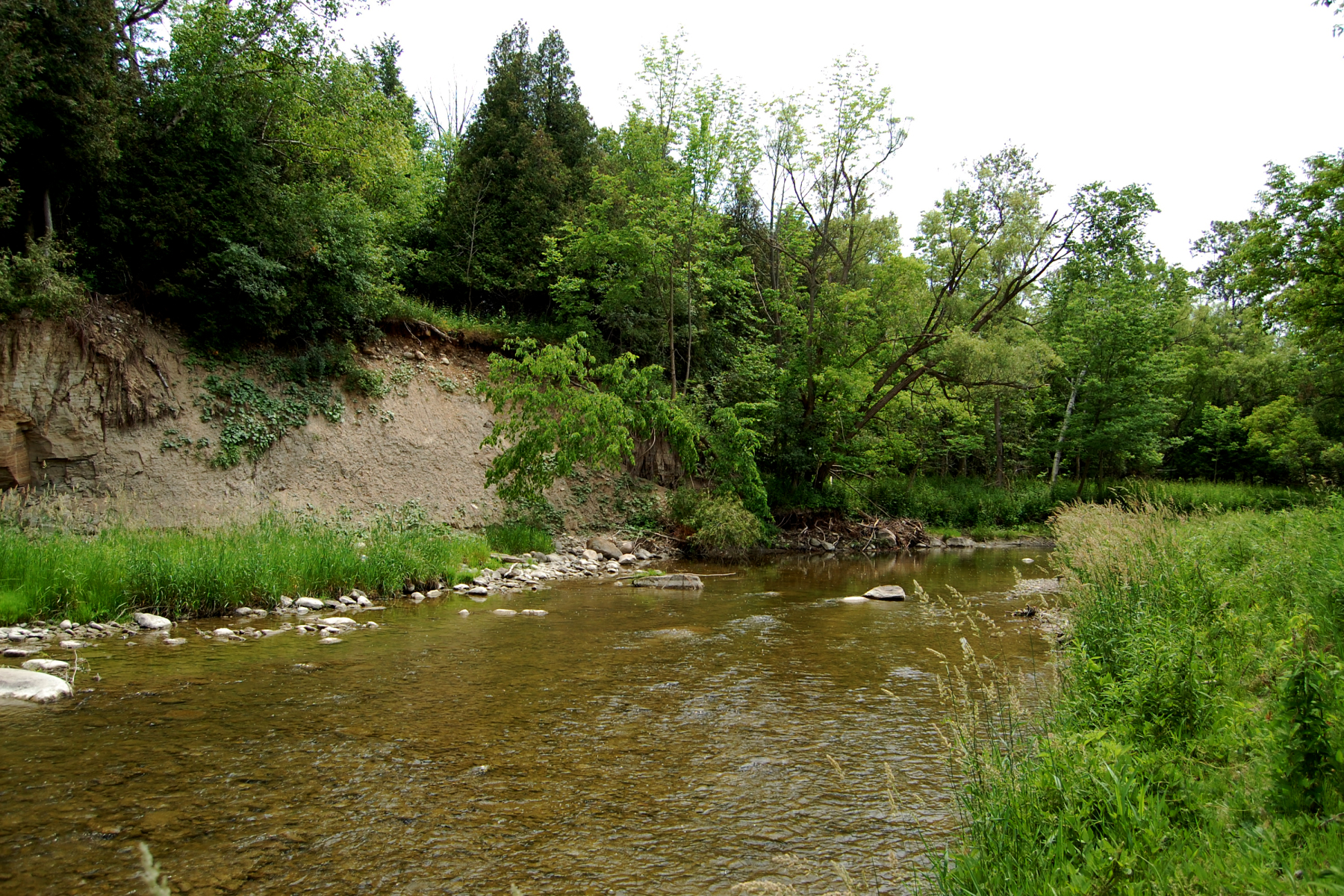
Little Rouge River is a tributary of the Rouge, that runs northeast to Bloomington.

- Little Rouge Creek (left) - runs northeast via Cedar Grove, Locust Hill, Dickson Hill, Ringwood, Lemonville, and Bloomington (Kennedy Road-Bethesda Road to Kingston Road and Altona Road)
  - Katabokokonk Creek - a short creek runs in northeast Markham (west of Reesor Road and Don Cousens Parkway to Major Mackenzie Drive and west of Reesor Road) and bears the original First Nations name of the Rouge
- Morningside Creek (right) - flows from an area near Dennison Avenue and Markham Road to southwest of the Toronto Zoo and east of Morningside Road
- Exhibition Creek - runs from north of 16th Avenue and Highway 48 to Markham and Highway 7
- Robinson Creek (left)- runs from north of Elgin Mills between McCowan Road and Kennedy Road to the east end of Milne Park at 48 and Highway 7
- Eckardt Creek (left) runs from storm management ponds at west of The Bridle Walk and 16th Avenue north to Bur Oak Avenue and east of The Bridle Walk
- Bruce Creek (left) - starts in several ponds in the southeast corner of Aurora, flows briefly through the northeast corner of Richmond Hill, then southeast in the southwest corner of Whitchurch-Stouffville, through Bruce's Mill Conservation Area and into Markham. It flows through Angus Glen Golf Club and into Toogood Pond in Unionville, just before which the tributary Berczy Creek joins. The creek runs several hundred metres more to its mouth just east of Kennedy Road (Kennedy-Highway 7 to Woodbine Avenue north of Bloomington Road)
  - Berczy Creek - runs from north of Stouffville Road and Woodbine Avenue into Bruce Creek just upstream of Toogood Pond
    - Carleton Creek - runs from Woodbine Avenue and Major Mackenzie Drive to Berczy Creek at 16th Avenue and Warden Avenue
- Beaver Creek (right); flows from Richmond Hill to the future Downtown Markham development area; bounded by Major Mackenzie Drive-Bayview Avenue to Warden-Highway 407
- Apple Creek - a small creek near Apple Creek Blvd, Rodick Road and runs between residential developments in a northwest direction to 16th Avenue and Buttonfield Road (just south of Cachet Centre shopping mall)

== Parks ==
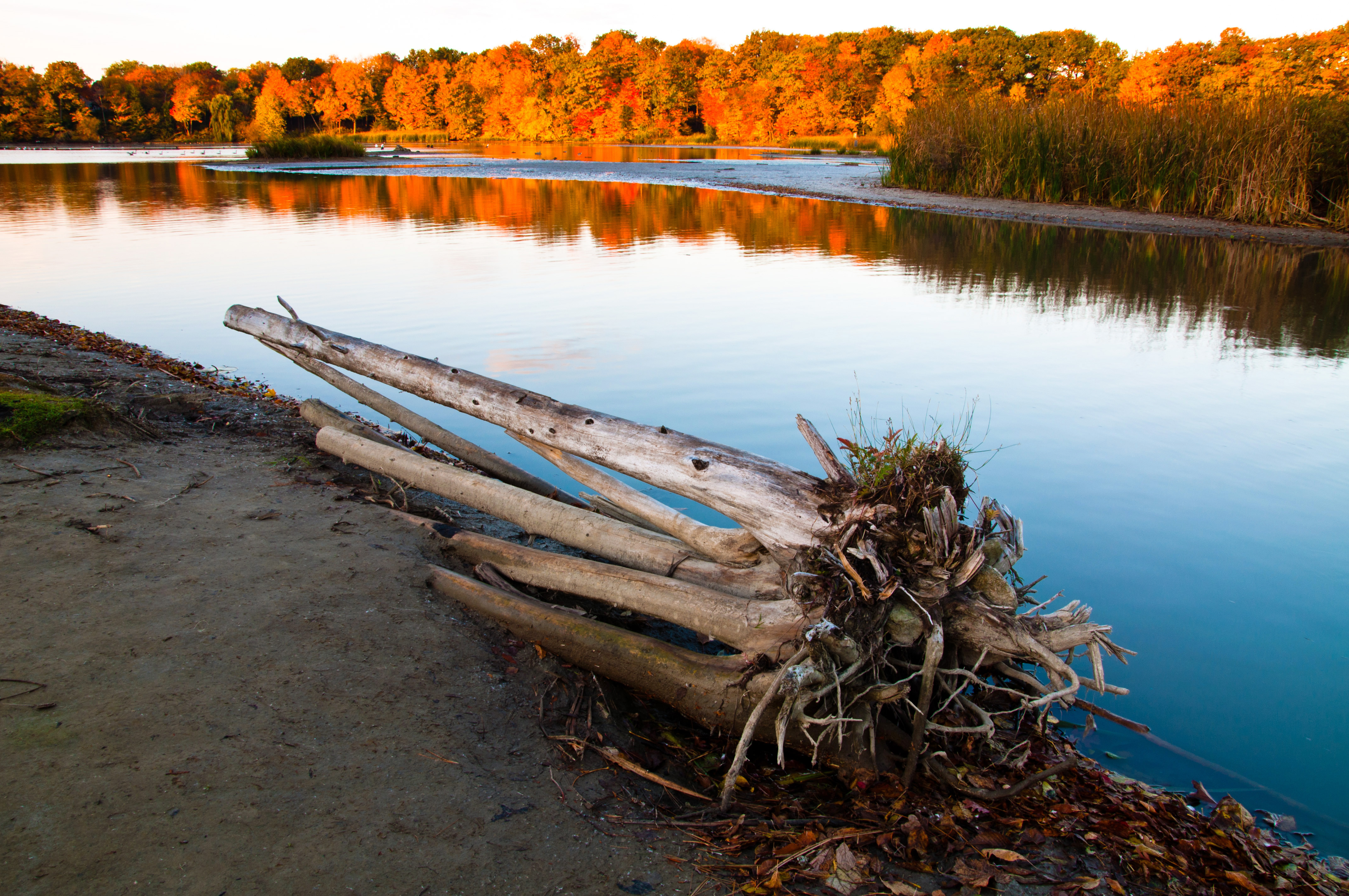
View of Rouge Pond from Rouge National Urban Park. The pond is located at the mouth of the river.

=== National Park ===
Rouge National Urban Park is a national urban park managed by Parks Canada. The Park the largest urban park in North America, comprising a significant portion of the Rouge River. The Park was created after the Ministry of Stephen Harper proposed, in the 41st Canadian Parliament throne speech, the creation of the national park.

=== Municipal parks ===
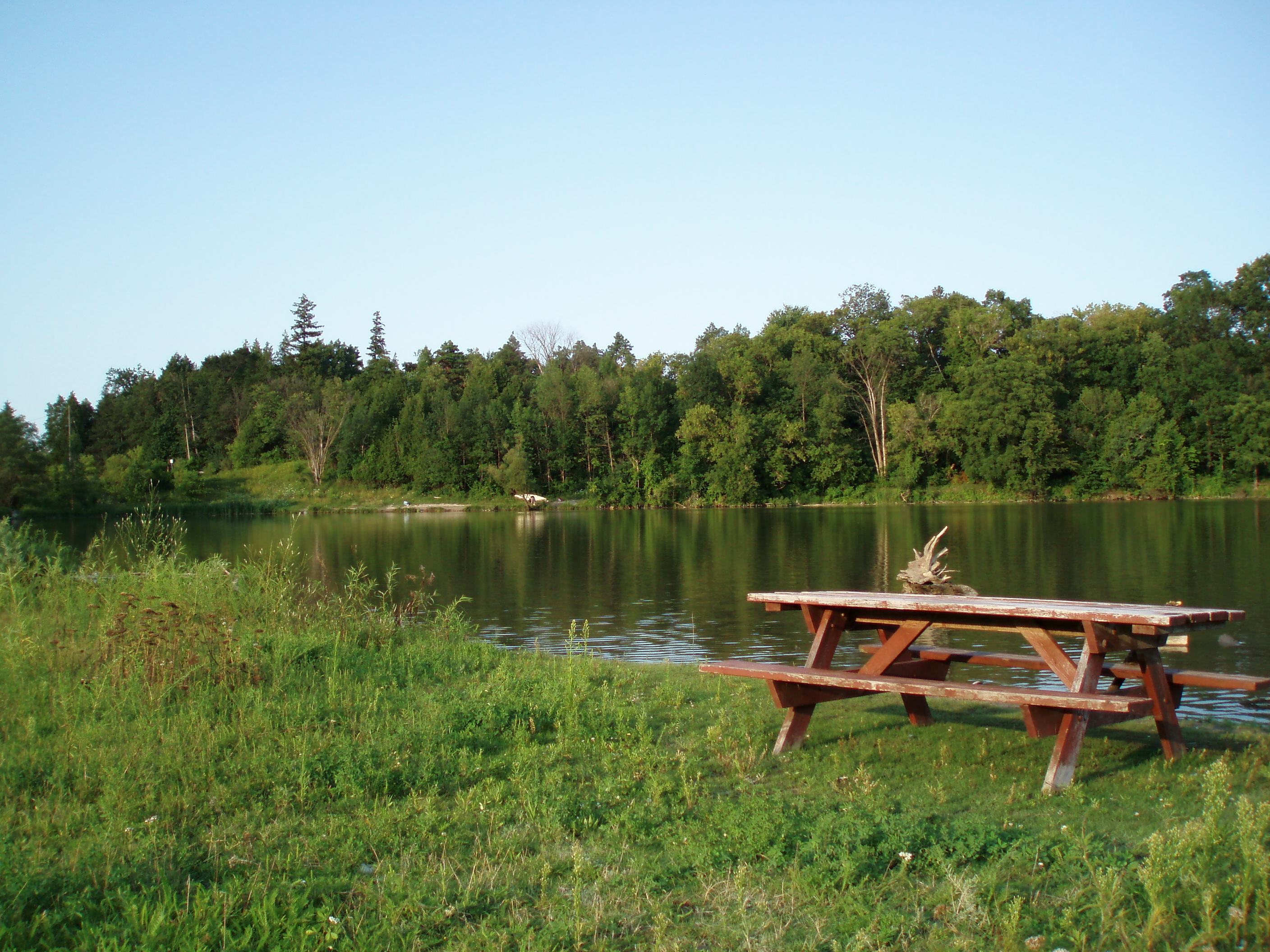
The Milne-Dam Conservation Park is one of several municipal parks that lie within the river's watershed.

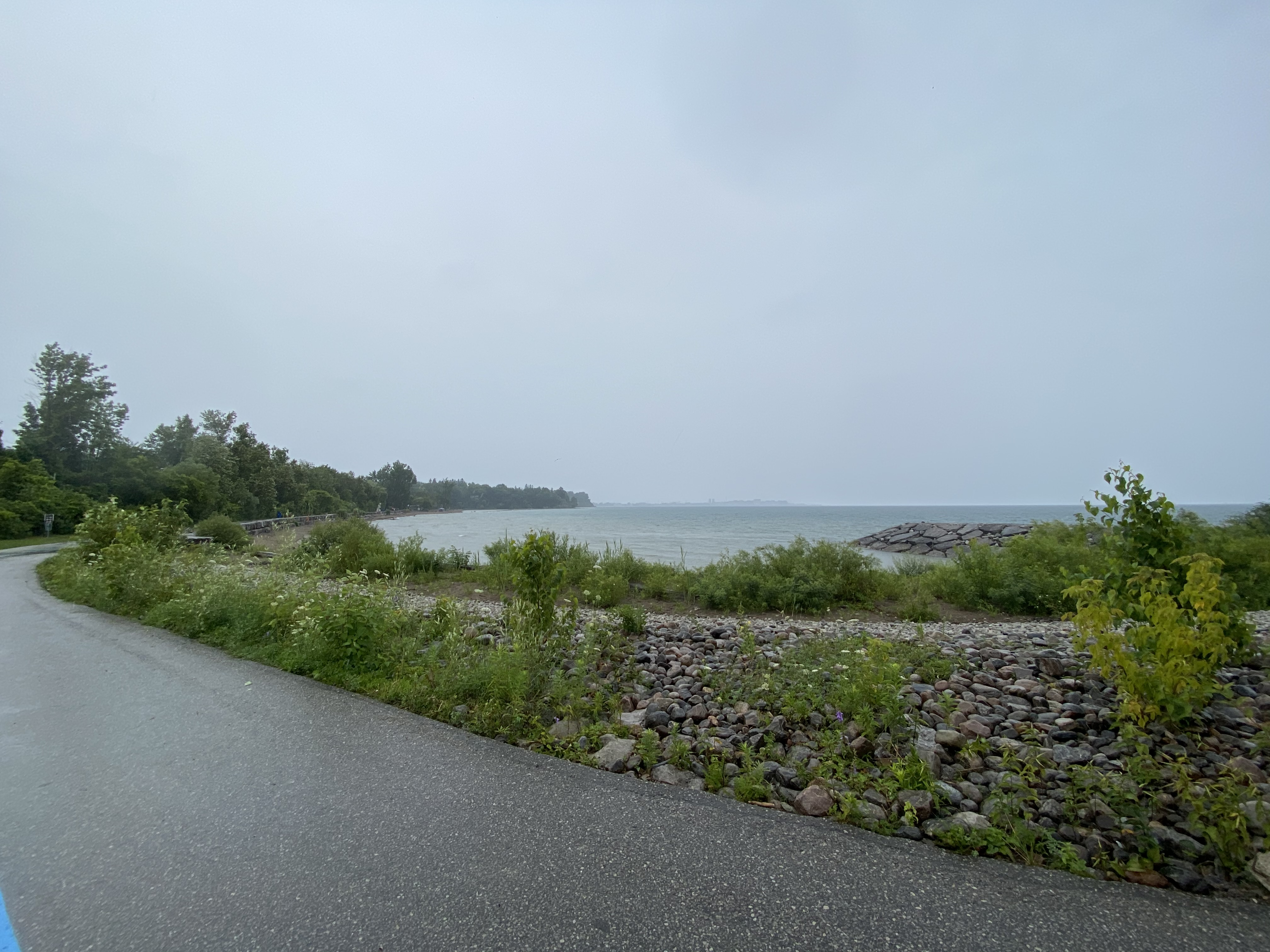
The Rouge Beach park during rain, located at the estuary of the Rouge River

There are a number of local parks around of the Rouge watershed managed by the municipalities of Markham, Pickering, Richmond Hill, and Toronto. In addition, the Toronto and Region Conservation Authority manages a number of parks and conservation areas. These parks include:

- Bob Hunter Memorial Park
- Littles Road Park
- Morningview Ravine Park
- Woodlands Park
- Glen Rouge Park
- Rouge Valley Park, Markham
- Rouge Beach Park
- Milne Park, Markham
- Apple Creek Park
- Cedar Valley Park
- Mount Joy Lake Park
- Springdale Park
- Monarch Park
- Ashton Meadows Park
- Artisan Park - Beaver Creek
- Beaver Greenway - Beaver Creek
- Bruce Creek Park
- Berczy Creek Park
- Boyton Woods Park
- Elgin Mills Cemetery
- Headwaters Park

== Metro East Freeway ==
The Rouge was threatened by the proposed Metro East Freeway which would have run along the river valley like the Don Valley Parkway from north Scarborough through Markham between Ninth Line and York-Durham Town Line terminating in Stouffville. The roadway came into existence following the cancellation of the Spadina Expressway and pause on Scarborough Expressway in 1971. It was removed from planning in 1994. Markham continues to seek an arterial connection to Ontario Highway 401 which led to the construction of Donald Cousens Parkway with planned connection to Highway 401 via extension of Morningside Avenue to Steeles Avenue.

== Golf courses ==
- Parkview Golf Course - created from former IBM Canada Course
- Markham Green Golf Course - created from former IBM Canada Course (c. 1960) and Box Grove Golf Club (c. 1940); part of clubhouse became Rouge River Community Centre in the 1990s (pool added 1999)
- Cedar Brae Golf & Country Club (c. 1922)
- York Downs Golf and Country Club
- Angus Glen Golf Club - opened in 1992 built on the former Angus Glen Farm (c. 1957)
- Markham Golf Club
- Buttonville Fairways Golf Centre

A 18-hole golf course, Unionville Golf Centre, operated from 1961 to 2007 on Main Street Unionville south of Highway 7 along the Rouge River. It is now site of Bill Crothers Secondary School. The golf greens area along the river have now been restored as natural habitat.

== Gallery ==
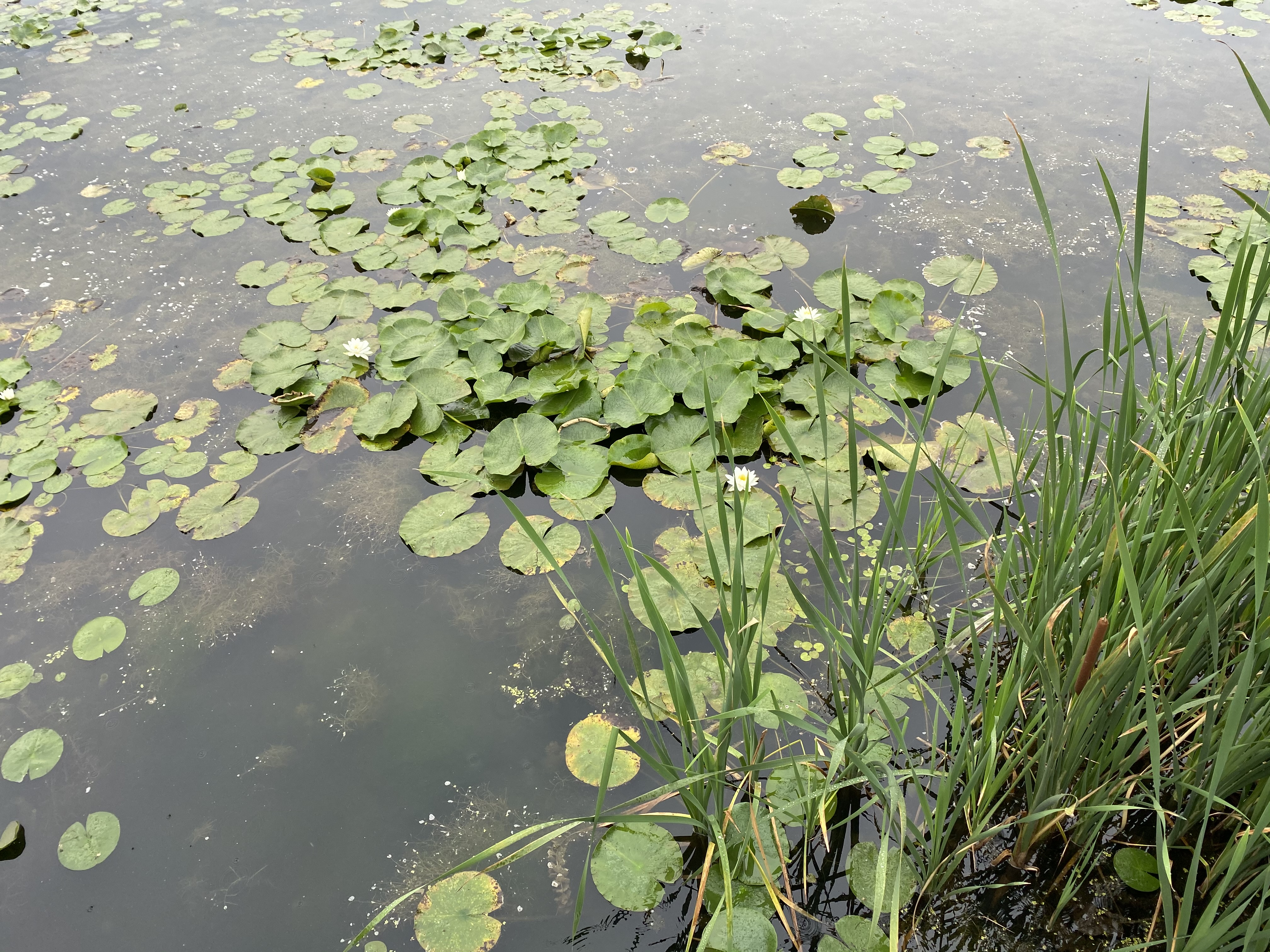
Lilies at the Marshes near Rouge beach park

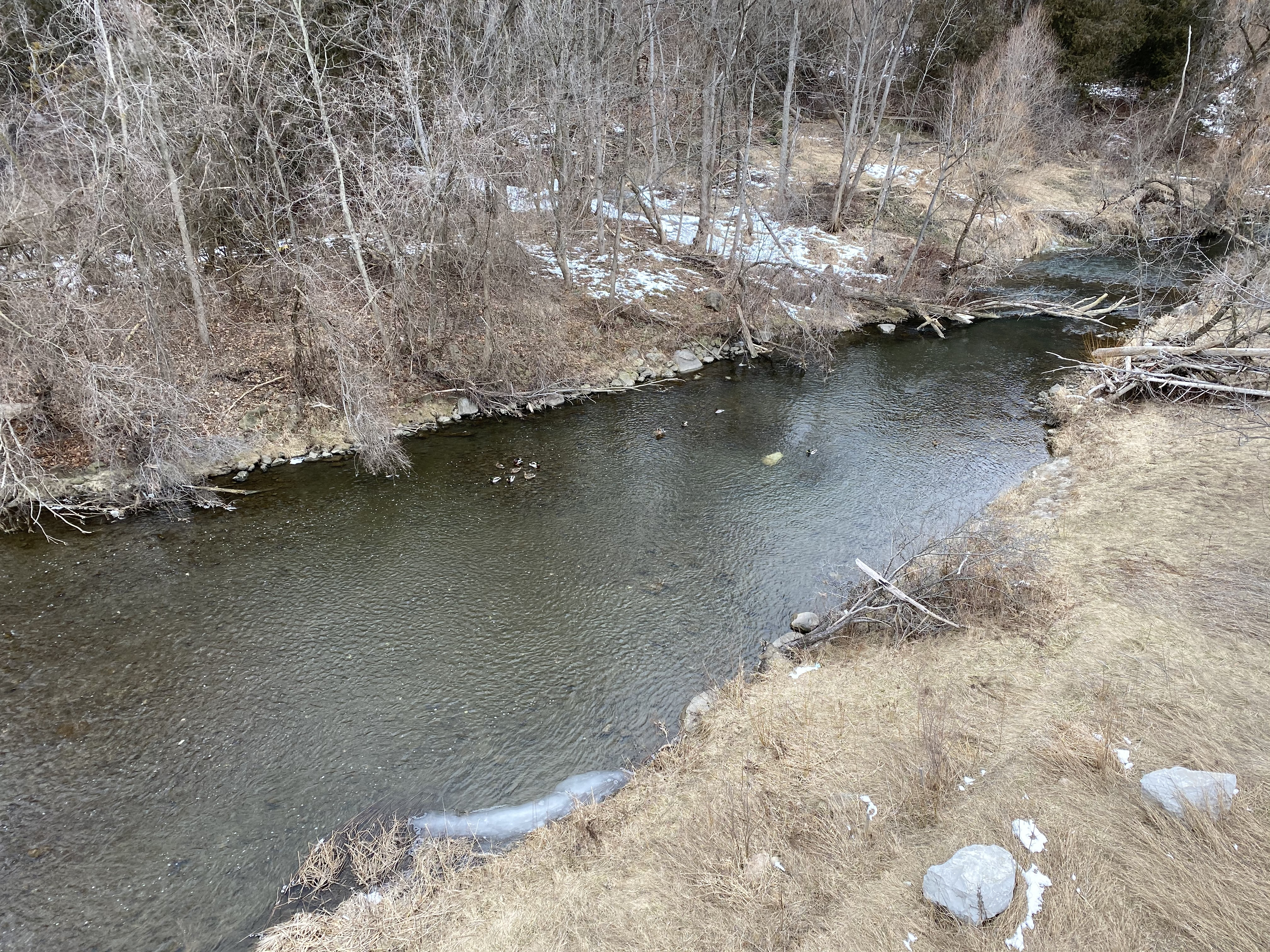
A picture of the Rouge River during winter

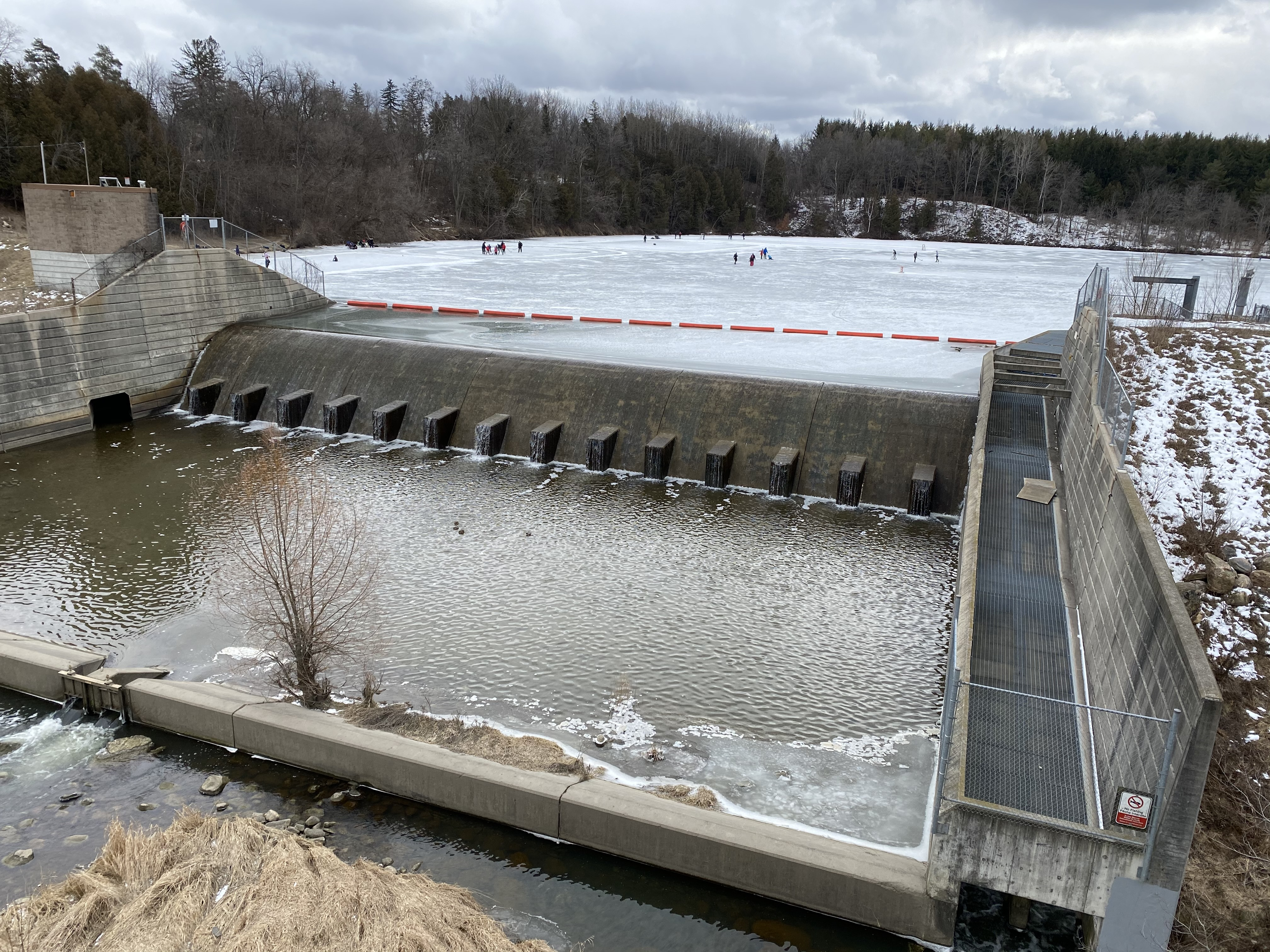
The Milne Dam Conservation Park in Winter

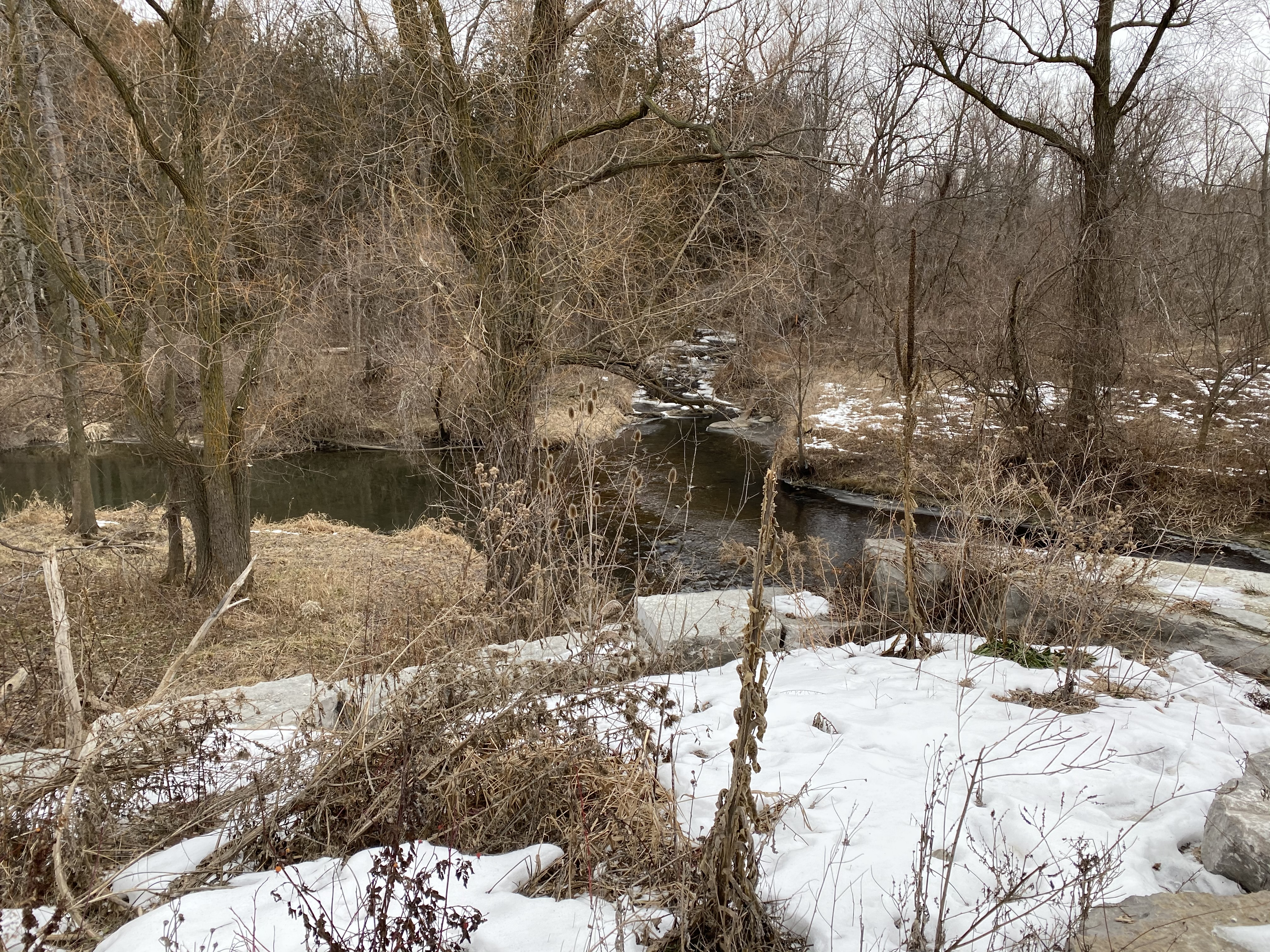
Picture of where the Robinson Creek meets the Rouge River

== See also ==
- List of Ontario rivers
- 10,000 Trees for the Rouge Valley
- Rouge River Bridge
