= Natural areas in King, Ontario =

There are numerous natural areas in King, a township in Ontario, Canada. These areas are zones officially designated by the Government of Ontario that are within the township and exhibit provincially or regionally significant features representative of the region. The list of zones is defined and maintained by the provincial Ministry of Natural Resources Natural Heritage Information Centre.

Site and region surveys have been conducted by various means. Some areas were identified and classified through the International Biological Program between 1964 and 1974. Others may have had a superficial initial classification, and subsequently been re-classified upon closer scrutiny. Fifty areas have been classified in the township.

== Areas of Natural and Scientific Interest ==
There are seven zones classified as Areas of Natural and Scientific Interest, three of which exhibit earth science features, and four of which exhibit life science features. Six are provincially significant for their representative features.

=== Life Science areas ===
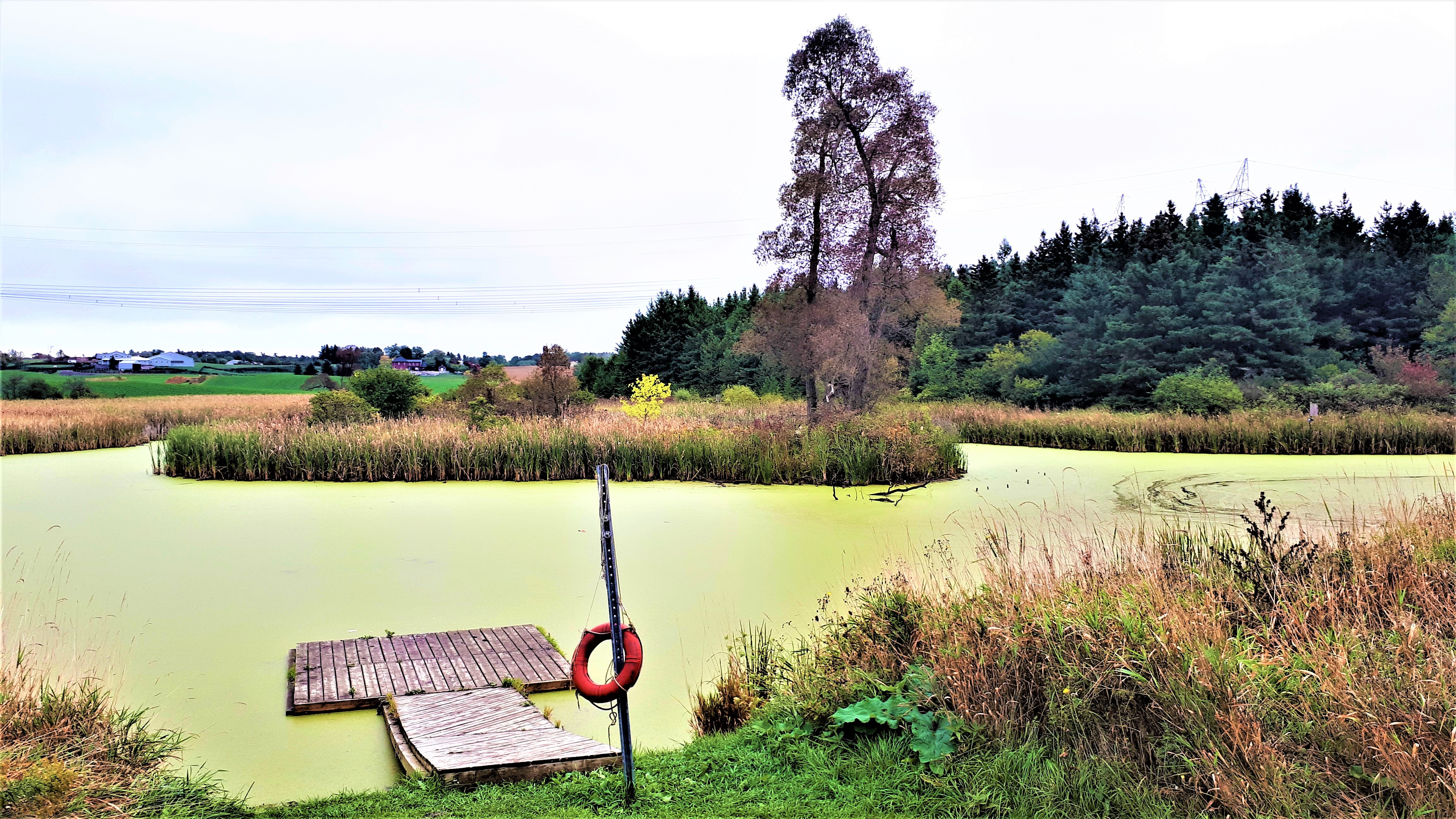
Cold Creek Conservation Area-Wetland Trail

Life science ANSIs are noted for their important biological features.

Happy Valley Forest is a large upland forest on steeply rolling topography with various wooded swamps and minor wetland areas. It is located on Ordovician bedrock over the Oak Ridges Moraine.

Pottageville Swamp, which was originally contiguous with the Holland Marsh, is now isolated from it because of drainage in the 1920s to prepare the land for agricultural use. The Pottageville Southeast Upland, which is contiguous with the swamp, is the only ANSI which is not provincially significant. It is just north of Happy Valley Forest, on the northern slope of the Oak Ridges Moraine.

Cold Creek Conservation Area is a park and reserve on the south slope of the Oak Ridges Moraine, northwest of Nobleton, at the southwestern edge of the township. It consists of mature coniferous swamp in its basin, and cedar swamp at its margin.

=== Earth Science areas ===
Earth Science ANSIs display significant geological features representative of their region.

The Linton-Kelly Lake Channels "marks the junction of the Oak Ridges Moraine and the Palgrave Moraine". It is a 588-hectare (1,450-acre) region at which the two moraines merge. The Glenville Hills Kames are kames in the northeast portion of the township, southwest of central Newmarket, that mark "the southernmost advance of Lake Simcoe sublobe during [the] Port Bruce Stadial". The Kettleby and Newmarket Tills is a small region of sediments deposited by the Lake Simcoe ice lobe, located west of the Glenville Hills Kames.

== Wetlands ==
King has an abundance of large, provincially significant wetland complexes.

The Eaton Hall—Mary—Hackett Lakes Wetland Complex is a 259 hectare area on the Oak Ridges Moraine which represents the amalgamation of three previously defined wetlands: Eaton Hall Wetlands, Mary Lakes Wetlands and Laskay Wetlands. These constituent wetlands are each situated at the headwater area of the East Humber River watershed in King City. "The largest wetlands occur around seven kettle lakes, representing the best concentration of kettle lakes in any wetland complex on the Oak Ridges Moraine" Bounded by Happy Valley Forest to the west, the 225 wetlands in the complex "comprise one of the largest and most diverse wetland complexes on the Oak Ridges Moraine, noteworthy for its high concentration of significant plants, animals and kettle lakes."

The much larger Pottageville Wetland Complex, which is adjacent to Happy Valley Forest on its northern border, also lies on the Oak Ridges Moraine. Approximately 780 hectares, it consists primarily of swamp, with some zones of marsh and fen.

The Nobleton Wetland Complex is a 43.3-hectare (107-acre) wetland that overlaps the Oak Ridges Moraine on its local southern extent in the region. It is similar in composition to the Pottageville Wetland Complex.

Overlapping the northern border of the township is Ansnorveldt Wetland Complex, a 200-hectare (490-acre) zone bounded by the Holland Marsh to the east and northeast. The wetland complex "stretches from Weston Road east to Dufferin Street and from Highway 9 north to South Canal Road".

Other wetlands on the Oak Ridges Moraine include: the New Scotland Wetland Complex, consisting of fifteen wetlands that are 61.2% swamp, 37.1% marsh, and 1.7% bog; the Eaton Hall Lake Wetland, consisting of eight separate wetlands that are 52.7% swamp and 47.3% marsh; the King Creek Marsh, consisting entirely of marsh wetland; the Kennifick Wetland Complex, having 33 wetlands composed of 40% swamp and 60% marsh; and the King–Vaughan Wetland Complex, which has 23 wetlands consisting of 83.4% swamp and 16.6% marsh.
