= Ecology of the Oak Ridges Moraine =

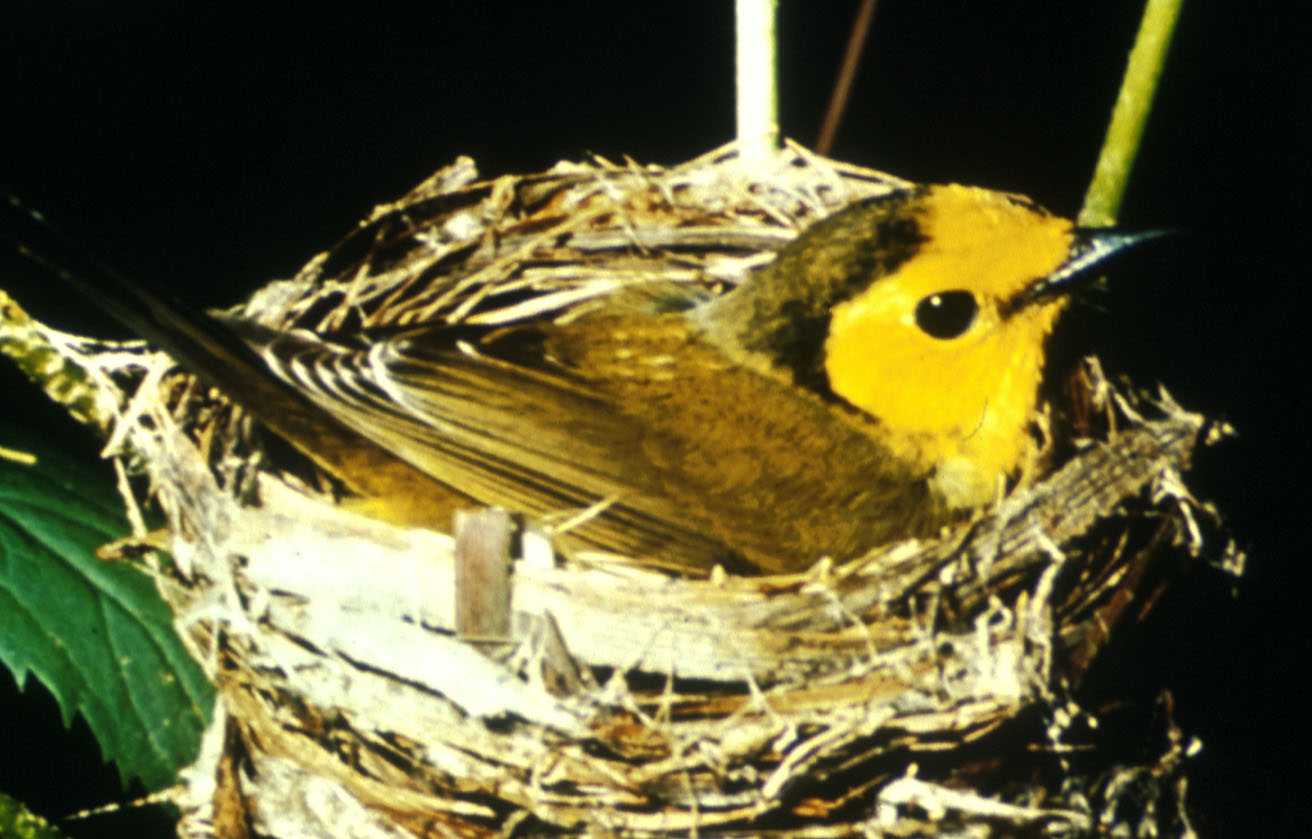
The hooded warbler is a threatened species in Canada. Happy Valley Forests is one of the few remaining Canadian habitats for this species.

The Oak Ridges Moraine lies in Southern Ontario, Canada. It contains the headwaters of sixty-five rivers and streams. It has a wide diversity of woodlands, wetlands, watercourses, kettle lakes, kettle bogs, and significant flora and fauna. It is one of the few remaining continuous green corridors in southern Ontario: it remains thirty percent forested and is one of the last refuges for forest birds in all of southern Ontario.

The moraine provides habitat for a wide variety of plant and animal species, over seventy of which are threatened or endangered in Canada, including the West Virginia white butterfly, Jefferson salamander, red-shouldered hawk, and American ginseng. The moraine's rare wetlands support plants and insects more typical of northern Ontario. The remnants of tallgrass prairie and oak-pine savanna in the eastern portion are globally threatened ecosystems.

== Happy Valley Forests ==
Happy Valley Forests is a 648-hectare upland forest with wooded swamps and minor wetland areas. It supports a diverse wildlife population, including over 100 species of birds, some of which are endangered or threatened in Canada. The forests are characterized by the dominant sugar maple in most areas, and red maple on its eastern edges. It is a provincial ANSI Life Science ecological zone.

== Provincially significant ecological areas ==
A number of provincially significant ecological areas are located in the Oak Ridges Moraine, among them forty-eight wetlands, and twenty-eight earth and life science Areas of Natural and Scientific Interest (ANSI-ES and ANSI-LS).

The table below lists the ecological zones by municipal jurisdiction; for zones that overlap multiple jurisdictions, the zone is listed in the jurisdiction which contains the greatest portion of that zone. Moreover, some of the zones listed may only have some portion of their complex on the Oak Ridges Moraine; for example, a small southern component of the Ansnorveldt Wetland Complex lies on the northern edge of the Oak Ridges Moraine.

Provincially significant ecological areas on the Oak Ridges Moraine; size is in hectares (100 hectares = 1 km^{2})
Caledon
Little Credit River Wetland Complex	43°49′N 79°54′W	270.6	Wetland
Credit Forks Wetland	43°49′N 79°58′W	29.4	Wetland
Gibson Lake Wetland	43°57′N 79°49′W	27.9	Wetland
Centreville Creek Wetland Complex	43°54′N 79°50′W	12.5	Wetland
Bolton Wetland Complex	44°14′N 80°15′W	5.7	Wetland
King Township
Pottageville Swamp	44°0′N 79°37′W	658.0	ANSI Life Science
Happy Valley Forests	43°57′N 79°36′W	648.0	ANSI Life Science
Pottageville Southeast Upland	43°58′N 79°36′W	90.0	ANSI Life Science
Cold Creek Conservation Area	43°54′N 79°42′W	81.7	ANSI Life Science
Glenville Hills Kames	44°2′N 79°31′W	345.0	ANSI Earth Science
Linton—Kelly Lake Channels	43°56′N 79°37′W	588.0	ANSI Earth Science
Kettleby and Newmarket Tills	44°1′N 79°33′W	0.2	ANSI Earth Science
Pottageville Wetland Complex	44°0′N 79°37′W	779.3	Wetland
Eaton Hall—Mary—Hackett Lakes Wetland Complex	43°57′N 79°33′W	259.0	Wetland
Ansnorveldt Wetland Complex	44°3′N 79°33′W	200.6	Wetland
Kennifick Wetland Complex	43°57′N 79°42′W	79.1	Wetland
Eaton Hall Lake Wetland	43°57′N 79°31′W	51.5	Wetland
King—Vaughan Wetland Complex	43°55′N 79°30′W	39.1	Wetland
Nobleton Wetland Complex	43°55′N 79°40′W	43.3	Wetland
New Scotland Wetland Complex	43°56′N 79°38′W	23.7	Wetland
King Creek Marsh	43°53′N 79°37′W	4.2	Wetland
East Gwillimbury
Mount Albert Wetlands	44°10′N 79°19′W	539.3	Wetland
Aurora
Wilcox—St. George Wetland Complex	43°53′N 79°29′W	102.0	Wetland
East Aurora Wetland Complex	44°1′N 79°28′W	28.0	Wetland
Aurora Marsh (McKenzie Marsh)	44°1′N 79°28′W	10.0	Wetland
Richmond Hill
Rouge River Headwater Wetland Complex	43°55′N 79°24′W	175.0	Wetland
Philips—Bond —Thompson Lakes Wetland Complex	43°55′N 79°27′W	61.0	Wetland
Snively Street Wetland Complex	43°57′N 79°26′W	21.5	Wetland
Philips Lake Wetland Complex	43°55′N 79°27′W	24.8	Wetland
Whitchurch-Stouffville
Vivian Infiltration Area (also in Uxbridge)	44°4′N 79°18′W	6346.0	Hydrological ESA
Musselman Lake Kettle Complex	44°2′N 79°15′W	258.0	ANSI Earth Science
White Rose Spillway	43°58′N 79°25′W	25.0	ANSI Earth Science
Musselman Lake Complex	44°0′N 79°17′W	100.0	ANSI Life Science
Vandorf Bog Complex	44°0′N 79°20′W	57.0	ANSI Life Science
Black River Wetland Complex #1	44°11′N 79°21′W	1378.8	Wetland
White Rose—Preston Lake Wetland Complex	43°58′N 79°23′W	137.6	Wetland
Musselman Lake Wetland	44°1′N 79°17′W	49.4	Wetland
East Musselman Wetland Complex	44°2′N 79°15′W	8.8	Wetland
Uxbridge Township
Little Rouge Creek Section	43°48′N 79°9′W	0.8	ANSI Earth Science
Tyrone River Valley	44°2′N 78°43′W	140.0	ANSI Life Science
Uxbridge Pine—Maple Uplands	44°3′N 79°6′W	93.0	ANSI Life Science
Uxbridge Forest Kames	44°0′N 79°5′W	644.0	ANSI Earth Science
Goodwood Formation	44°3′N 79°12′W	0.2	ANSI Earth Science
Uxbridge Brook Headwater Wetland Complex	44°5′N 79°8′W	159.6	Wetland
Goodwood/Glasgow Wetland Complex	44°0′N 79°11′W	70.6	Wetland
North Goodwood Wetland Complex	44°2′N 79°12′W	22.4	Wetland
Scugog Township
Lake Scugog #37 Wetland	44°7′N 78°48′W	192.6	Wetland
City of Pickering
Clarke Summit Swamp	43°56′N 78°31′W	118.0	ANSI Life Science
Northumberland County
Garden Hill Pitted Outwash	44°3′N 78°24′W	1003.0	ANSI Earth Science
Millvalley Hills Forests	44°4′N 78°6′W	320.0	ANSI Life Science
Shelter Valley	44°3′N 78°1′W	312.0	ANSI Life Science
Peter's Woods Provincial Nature Reserve (Settler's Woods)	44°7′N 78°2′W	33.43	ANSI Life Science
East Cross Creek #15 - Wetland	44°15′N 78°43′W	2340.4	Wetland
Kawartha Lakes
Fleetwood Kames	44°7′N 78°36′W	939.0	ANSI Earth Science
Peterborough
Omemee Esker South	44°14′N 78°35′W	366.0	ANSI Earth Science
