= Oak Ridges Trail Association =

Coordinates: 43.92742°N 79.52692°W

The Oak Ridges Trail Association (ORTA) is an incorporated charity whose purpose is to develop, maintain, promote and expand the hiking trail system across the Oak Ridges Moraine in south-central Ontario, Canada. ORTA has ten chapters, each of which maintains a section of the approximately 250 km of trail. The Oak Ridges Trail is connected to the Bruce Trail, Ganaraska Trail, Nokiidaa Trail and Trans Canada Trail. ORTA is governed by a board of directors who have responsibilities for managing the various aspects of the organization. Directors on the board are elected at an annual general meeting. ORTA Mission Statement is "To build and maintain a public hiking trail system on the Oak Ridges moraine, off-road where possible, and To organize and promote hiking on this trail system, and To encourage responsible stewardship of the Moraine's natural environment."

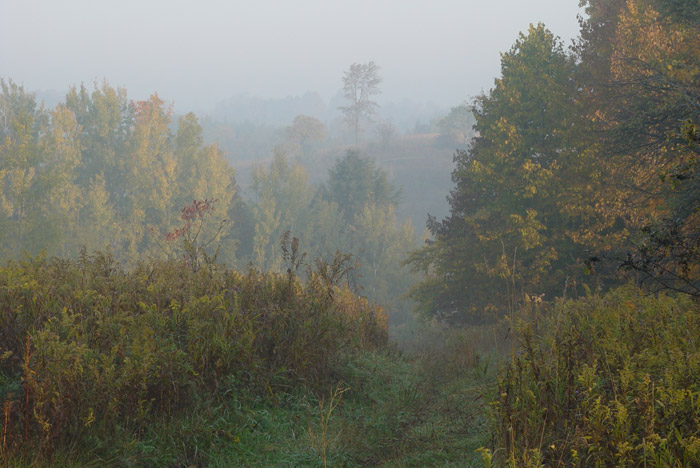
Along the trail

== History ==
Efforts to establish a trail along the Oak Ridges Moraine first began in 1973. The Ontario Trail Riders' Association established the Great Pine Ridge Equestrian Trail located primarily along existing roads and road allowances.

In 1991, a group of volunteers gathered through the cooperation of STORM (Save the Oak Ridges Moraine), the Metro Toronto and Region Conservation Authority and Hike Ontario. These volunteers developed the idea of a system of public recreational trails along the full length of the moraine, from Albion Hills in the west, to the Northumberland Forest in the east.

The volunteers formed an Oak Ridges Trail Steering Committee and following a series of meetings, the Oak Ridges Trail Association (ORTA) was officially inaugurated at a public meeting held at Albion Hills in May 1992. The main objective of the association is to develop and secure the Oak Ridges Trail "...thereby promoting an appreciation and respect for the Moraine's ecological, cultural and scenic integrity, with the aim of retaining a trail corridor in its natural state." [Oak Ridges Trail Guidebook 2004] ORTA now comprises over 700 members and extends across the Oak Ridges Moraine with a main trail and various side trails. From the eastern terminus of Warkworth, Ontario and Cramahe, Ontario past Rice Lake toward Campbellford; to its present western end past Palgrave toward Mono Cliffs Provincial Park and branching south to Caledon, Ontario.

ORTA offers a marked trail and side trails, a detailed guidebook, quarterly newsletter, and a program of group hikes - over 300 hikes, snowshoe or ski outings per year.

== Funding ==
ORTA receives funding from both private and corporate donations. In the past grants were received from the Oak Ridges Moraine Foundation and Ontario Trillium Foundation Ontario's 2005 Greenbelt Act and associated Greenbelt Plan have brought a measure of financial assistance to attempts to preserve the environmental integrity of this natural resource. Funds are also derived from the memberships annual dues and their signature event Moraine Adventure Relay via team entry fees.
