= Pottageville, Ontario =

Pottageville
- Unincorporated community
- Location within Canada Location within Ontario Location within North America
- Coordinates: 43°59′31″N 79°37′23″W
- Country: Canada
- Province: Ontario
- Regional Municipality: York
- Township: King

Government
  - Township mayor: Steve Pellegrini
  - MP: Deb Schulte
  - MPP: Stephen Lecce
  - Councillor: Bill Cober (Ward 4)
- Time zone: UTC-5 (EST)
  - Summer (DST): UTC-4 (EDT)
- Forward sortation area: L0G
- Area codes: 905 and 289
- NTS Map: 030M13
- GNBC Code: FCIDW

Pottageville is an unincorporated community located in northeastern King Township, in Ontario, Canada. It is near Schomberg. It is named for one of its early settlers, Edward Pottage.

== Ecology ==
Parts of Pottageville, particularly the ecological areas outside the village, are located on the northern face of the sensitive Oak Ridges Moraine. Characteristic of other parts of the moraine, the ecological areas of Pottageville exhibit a range of features.

=== Pottageville Wetland Complex ===
The Pottageville Wetland Complex is a provincially significant 7.8 km^{2} wetland complex composed of 43 individual wetlands. The wetland consists of 93.1% swamp, 6.3% marsh and 0.6% fen. A diversity of soil types is present in this complex, including: humic and mesic (63%); clay and loam (16.7%); sand (15.9%); silt or marl (2.6%); and fibric (1.8%). The site is principally palustrine (93.6% with inflow, 3.6% without inflow), with small areas which are of riverine (2.2%) and isolated (0.6%) nature. The vegetation found within the complex is also varied, though primarily deciduous (62.6%). Other constituent vegetation includes coniferous trees (16.5%), tall shrubs (11.1%) and dead trees (3.5%).

=== Pottageville Southeast Upland Forest ===
The Pottageville Southeast Upland Forest, situated north of Happy Valley Forests, is a 0.9 km^{2} forest on the north-facing slope of the Oak Ridges Moraine. It consists primarily of Maple, Beech and Hemlock trees. A number of creek valleys, containing tributaries of the Holland River, are found within the forest. It is classified as a regionally significant Life Sciences Area of Natural and Scientific Interest by the Government of Ontario Ministry of Natural Resources.

=== Pottageville Swamp ===
The Pottageville Swamp is a 6.58 km^{2} provincially significant Life Sciences Area of Natural and Scientific Interest. The swamp complex includes a 2 km^{2} section Pottageville Swamp North, a deciduous swamp which extends north from Highway 9 and consists largely of muck overlaying glaciolacustrine deposits. The southern extent of the swamp is a 5.27 km^{2} area of "poorly drained soils".

The swamp was originally contiguous with the Holland Marsh, but became isolated from it during the 1920s when the land was prepared for agricultural use through drainage projects, which has had a "drying effect" on the bog The swamp and bog were classified via the International Biological Program.

== Climate ==
Pottageville has a continental climate moderated by the Great Lakes and influenced by warm, moist air masses from the south, and cold, dry air from the north. The Oak Ridges Moraine affects levels of precipitation: as an air mass arrives from Lake Ontario and reaches the elevated ground surface of the moraine, it rises causing precipitation.

Climate data for Pottageville
Month	Jan	Feb	Mar	Apr	May	Jun	Jul	Aug	Sep	Oct	Nov	Dec	Year
Record high °C (°F)	13.0 (55.4)	14.5 (58.1)	24.0 (75.2)	30.0 (86.0)	32.5 (90.5)	35.5 (95.9)	36.0 (96.8)	35.6 (96.1)	33.0 (91.4)	27.0 (80.6)	24.0 (75.2)	20.0 (68.0)	36.0 (96.8)
Mean daily maximum °C (°F)	−3.4 (25.9)	−2.3 (27.9)	3.1 (37.6)	11.0 (51.8)	18.5 (65.3)	23.6 (74.5)	26.3 (79.3)	25.1 (77.2)	20.1 (68.2)	13.1 (55.6)	6.0 (42.8)	−0.4 (31.3)	11.7 (53.1)
Mean daily minimum °C (°F)	−11.4 (11.5)	−10.6 (12.9)	−5.5 (22.1)	1.2 (34.2)	6.4 (43.5)	11.3 (52.3)	13.9 (57.0)	13.0 (55.4)	9.0 (48.2)	3.6 (38.5)	−1.0 (30.2)	−7.2 (19.0)	1.9 (35.4)
Record low °C (°F)	−36.0 (−32.8)	−33.0 (−27.4)	−29.0 (−20.2)	−14.0 (6.8)	−4.0 (24.8)	−2.0 (28.4)	2.5 (36.5)	0.5 (32.9)	−6.5 (20.3)	−8.9 (16.0)	−22.0 (−7.6)	−31.5 (−24.7)	−36.0 (−32.8)
Average precipitation mm (inches)	53.9 (2.12)	44.4 (1.75)	55.0 (2.17)	62.8 (2.47)	72.0 (2.83)	75.1 (2.96)	87.8 (3.46)	88.6 (3.49)	83.3 (3.28)	68.3 (2.69)	57.3 (2.26)	25.4 (1.00)	690.9 (27.20)
Source: Environment Canada

== Notable Features ==
From the late 1950s until 2009, Pottageville was the home of the Toronto Gymnosophical Society. The society had become known affectionately as Glen Echo Nudist Park, a nudist resort. It boasted a 10,000 square foot clubhouse, a spring fed pond for swimming, volleyball courts and many acres of wooded recreation where members could camp or construct their own cottages. The camp was owned and operated by Mary & Edward Todorowsky.

Pottageville is home to a closed airport. A narrow gravel strip is what is left over after an attempt to have an airport. A nearby water ditch was dug to allow float-equipped aircraft to land there. The locals got together and forced the closure.
