= Happy Valley Forest =

Forest in Ontario, Canada

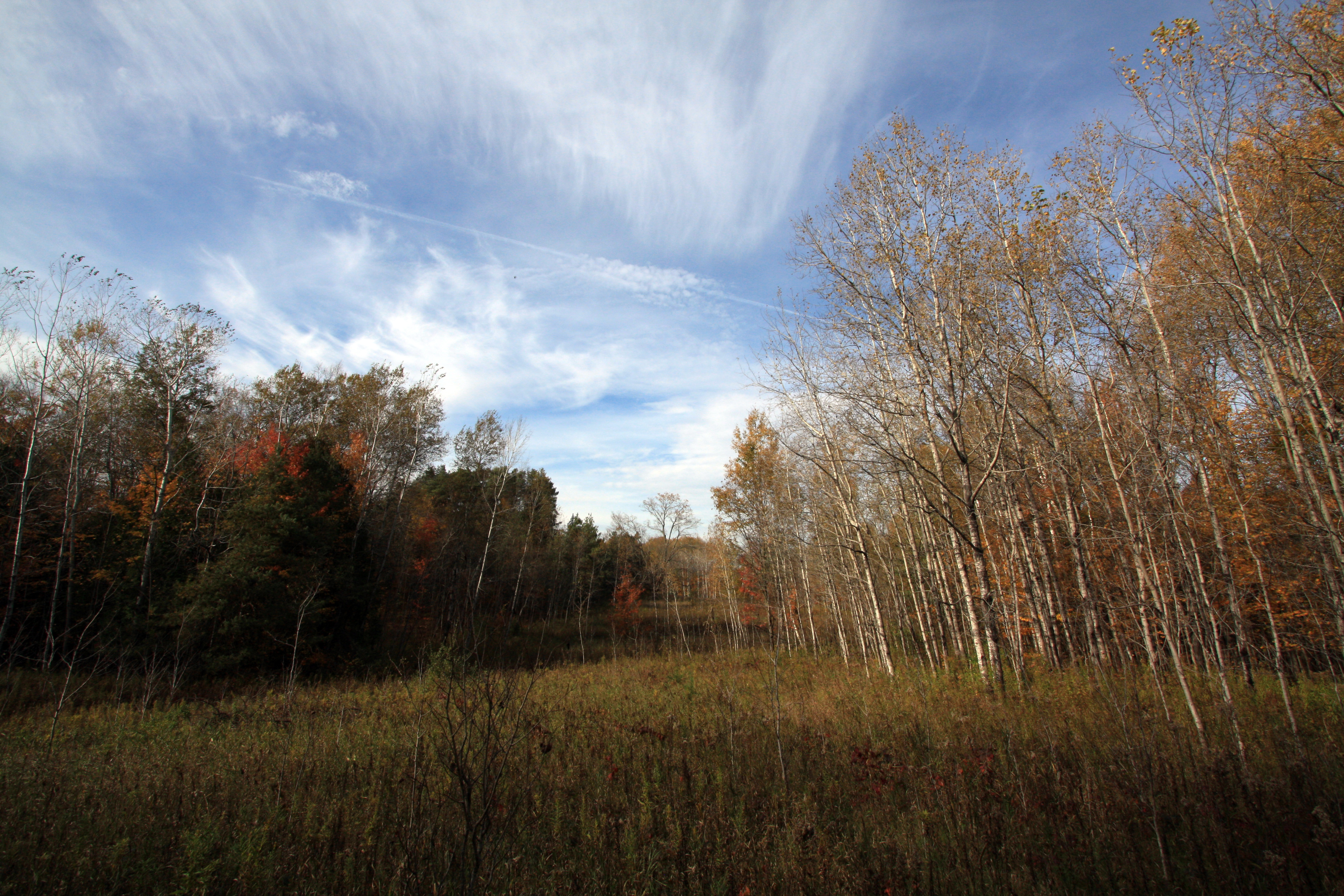
- Interactive map of Happy Valley Forest

Geography
- Location: King, Ontario, Canada
- Coordinates: 43°57′50″N 79°37′15″W
- Area: 6.48 km^{2} (2.50 mi^{2})

Ecology
- Dominant tree species: Sugar maple

Happy Valley Forest is a 6.48 square kilometre provincially significant ecological area, classified as an Area of Natural and Scientific Interest by the Ontario Ministry of Natural Resources. It consists of an upland forest on steeply rolling topography, various wooded swamps, and minor wetland areas (wet meadows, thickets and cattail swamps). A few small kettle ponds are also present.

Located on Ordovician bedrock over the Oak Ridges Moraine, the forest attains elevations between 122 and 152 m, increasing westward. The majority of the area is composed of overburden of ice-contract stratified drift of sand, gravel and silt of varying origin (kame, outwash or collapse). Soil types in the forests are predominantly Pontypool sandy loam; Brighton sandy loam, King clay loam (southern and western steep areas), and bottomland (along stream banks) are present in small areas.

The upland forest is dominated by sugar maple in most areas, and sugar maple and American beech in others, though species such as paper birch, white ash, eastern hemlock, black cherry and red oak are found throughout. The eastern portion is instead dominated by red maple and red oak, interspersed by American beech, paper birch, eastern hemlock and largetooth aspen.

In the valleys of this forest can be found largetooth aspen with white birch, red maple and occasional beech, red oak and trembling aspen. Moreover, several kettle depressions and small kettle ponds are present in the area.

Supporting over 100 bird species, and numerous other wildlife species, the Happy Valley Forest is recognized for its size and the presence of various rare species. Native and rare species include:

- Acadian flycatcher (endangered)
- Hooded warbler (threatened)
- Jefferson salamander
- Cerulean warbler

The red-shouldered hawk was a vulnerable species, but as a result of conservation efforts, was reclassified in 2006 and is no longer at risk. Note that the status of the species listed above is for Canada only. None of these species is currently facing global extinction.

The forest is also home to the northern flying squirrel and the southern flying squirrel, which depend on trees with holes for nesting and food storage. The southern flying squirrel is at the northern extent of its range in Happy Valley Forest.

== Happy Valley Infiltration Area ==
The Happy Valley Infiltration Area is the source for the Happy Valley Tributary, which merges with the Schomberg River. It has an area of 9.45 km².

== Politics ==
In addition to the politics of the Oak Ridges Moraine, Happy Valley Forest faces a number of political and social issues. Since the late 1990s, ATV use throughout the forest became a concern, both because the vehicles create noise, and because they cause damage to various plants; some indigenous plants are in danger of extirpation, while similar, hardier invasive species take over their habitat. To address the issue, in 2007 the township passed a bylaw mandating that all concession roads in the forest be closed, and erected fences around the property to eliminate access to ATVs.

The Nature Conservancy of Canada (NCC) has a long-term goal to protect 500 acres (2 km²) of Happy Valley Forest. Over 630 acres (2.5 km^{2}) of land are currently protected by the NCC and its partners via land purchases, land donations and conservation easements. In May 2013, NCC announced that 90 acres of conservation lands named Love Mountain in the Happy Valley Forest Natural Area were donated by a family that acquired the land in 1930, and funding for its conservation was obtained from private parties, the Government of Canada, and the Regional Municipality of York.
