= Snively =

Snively may refer to:

== People ==
- A. Barr Snively (1899–1964), American football player and coach
- Carlisle Snively, past headmaster for The Wyndcroft School (1948–1980)
- Clarence E. Snively (1874–1964), Chief of the Los Angeles Police Department
- Cornelia Ellis Snively (1939–2009), American civic leader and First Lady of Alabama
- David Snively (born 1960), Canadian diver
- Jacob Snively (1809–1871), Arizona and Texas pioneer
- Joe Snively (born 1996), American ice hockey player
- John A. Snively (1889–1958), citrus fruit magnate in Florida and Georgia
- John H. Snively, chemist and engraver, mid-19th century
- Mary Agnes Snively (1847–1933), first president of the Canadian Society of Superintendents of Training Schools for Nurses
- Robert Snively, former mayor of Essex, Ontario
- Samuel F. Snively (1859–1952), mayor of Duluth, Minnesota, USA
- Susannah Snively (1815–1892), wife of Brigham Young, married 1844
- Suzanne Snively, American company director and economic strategist in New Zealand
- Thomas V. Snively III, singer, musician, and guitar player, Grandson of Thomas V. Snively, citrus fruit magnate in Winter Haven, Florida and Cypress Gardens, Florida, cousin of country musician Gram Parsons

== Fictional characters ==
- Snively, nephew and minion of Dr. Ivo Robotnik and antagonist in the Sonic the Hedgehog cartoons and comics.
- Norman Snively, an alcoholic clown, in the movie Air Bud.
- Snively, Mrs. Throckmorton's prankster nephew in the movie Yogi's First Christmas.

== Places ==
- Snively Arena, a recreation facility adjacent to Whittemore Center on the campus of the University of New Hampshire
- Snively Farm, an historic home and farm located near Eakles Mills, Washington County, Maryland, United States
- Snively Street Wetland Complex, a wetland in Oak Ridges Moraine, Richmond Hill Township, Ontario, Canada
