= Glen Echo Park =

Glen Echo Park can refer to:

- Glen Echo Park, Maryland, a park in Glen Echo, Maryland, USA
- Glen Echo Park, Missouri, a village in Missouri, USA
- Glen Echo Park, Ontario, a naturist club in King, Ontario, Canada
