= Happy Valley, Ontario =

Happy Valley, Ontario can refer to:

- Happy Valley, King, Ontario
- Happy Valley, Greater Sudbury, Ontario
