= Uxbridge Forest Kames =

Coordinates: 44°00′25″N 79°05′50″W

The Uxbridge Forest Kames is a 644-hectare (1,591-acre) provincially significant Earth Science Area of Natural and Scientific Interest in Ontario, Canada. The land is owned and managed by the Toronto and Region Conservation Authority.

It was formed during the Port Huron Stadial of the Late Wisconsinan, during which sedimentary deposits from the Lake Ontario ice lobe of the retreating glacial sheet. On the southern slope of the Oak Ridges Moraine, its southern extent consists of Halton Till, flattened to a till plain. The northernmost advance of Halton Till deposited during the Port Bruce Stadial is demarcated by kettle lakes which occur throughout the Uxbridge Forest Kames.

It acts as a groundwater recharge zone for the Duffins Creek watershed, for which it is one of the primary sources of water.
