= Cold Creek Conservation Area =

Protected area in Ontario, Canada

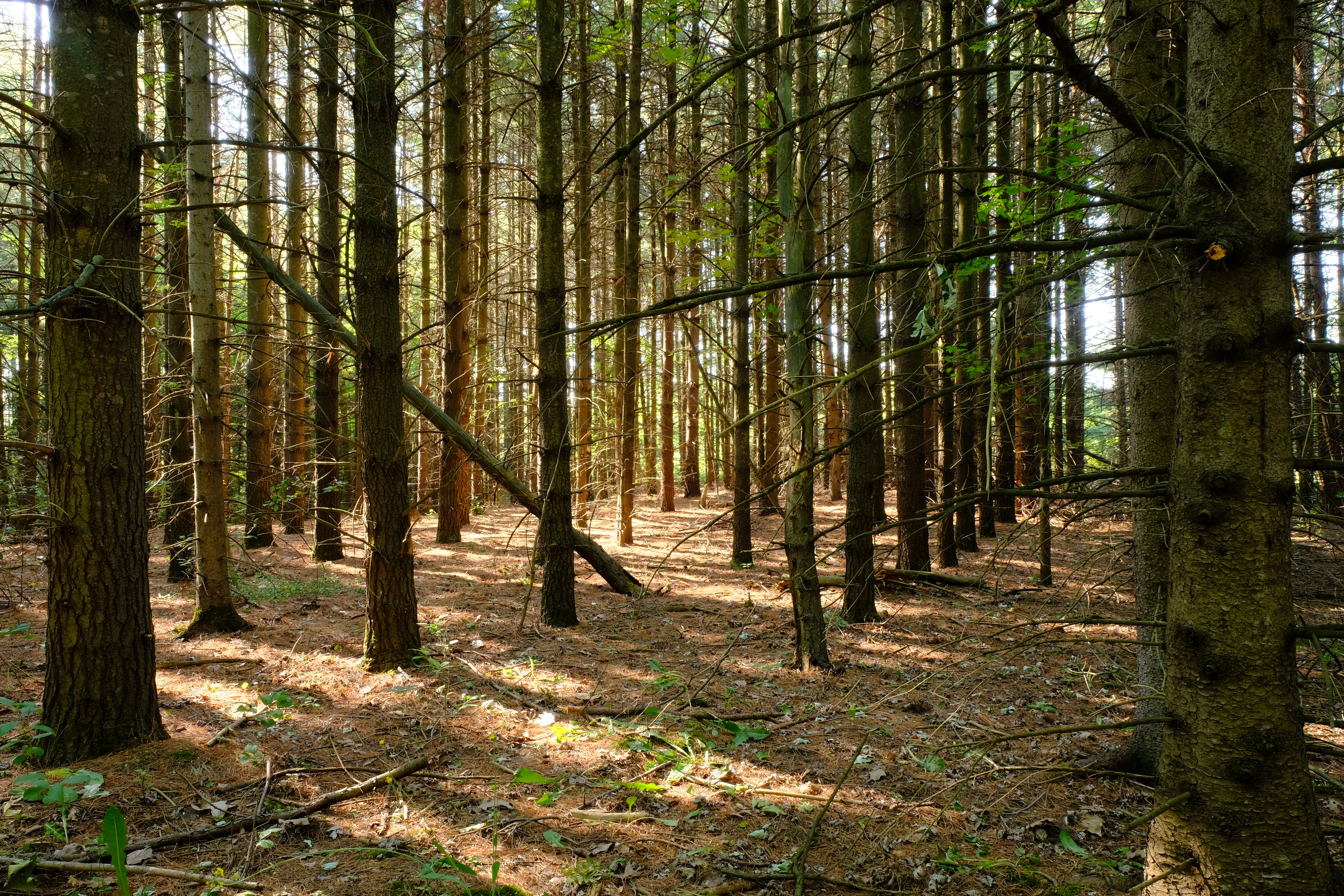

- Location within Ontario
- Location: King Township, Ontario, Canada
- Nearest city: Bolton
- Coordinates: 43.9138°N 79.6995°W
- Area: 190 hectares (470 acres)
- Established: 1962
- Website: coldcreek.ca

Cold Creek Conservation Area, usually referred simply as Cold Creek, is an ecologically diverse protected Area of Natural and Scientific Interest in south-central Ontario, Canada. The 190-hectare (470-acre) conservation area was opened on 20 June 1962 by Wilf Spooner and the Toronto and Region Conservation Authority. It is located on the western end of King Township, overlapping the Oak Ridges Moraine. The Government of Ontario Ministry of Natural Resources classifies the area as a provincially significant Area of Natural and Scientific Interest (Life Science) for its "provincially or regionally significant representative ecological features". The area was also a site classified for the International Biological Program. The Life Science area, known as Cold Creek Swamp, is composed of a swamp and forest.

Cold Creek has hiking trails that cover the Oak Ridges Moraine and a boreal peat bog, among others. At least 110 species of birds have been observed at Cold Creek. Nest boxes are distributed throughout the conservation area to house birds and bats.

== See also ==
- Ecology of the Oak Ridges Moraine
