= Fleetwood Kames =

Coordinates: 44°7′53″N 78°36′44″W

The Fleetwood Kames is a 939 hectare provincially significant Earth Science Area of Natural and Scientific Interest in Ontario, Canada. The topographical feature is located on the north slope of the Oak Ridges Moraine, in the city of Kawartha Lakes. Part of the parcel, known as Fleetwood Creek, is owned by the Ontario Heritage Foundation.

Formed in the Late Wisconsinan period, it consists of a till plain and drumlins from the Port Bruce Stadial, and kettles, eskers and kames from the Port Huron Stadial. To the north, it is adjacent to the Omemee Esker. The drumlin, part of the Peterborough Drumlin Field, is a rarity on the Oak Ridges Moraine.
