= Glenville Hills Kames =

Coordinates: 44°1′57.91″N 79°31′3.15″W

The Glenville Hills Kames is a 345 hectare provincially significant Earth Science Area of Natural and Scientific Interest in Ontario, Canada.

Located in the northeastern part of the township of King, it contains most of the eastern portion of Jokers Hill, the site of the Koffler Scientific Reserve which conducts ecological research in the area. It consists of Late Wisconsinan deposits of Newmarket Till, from the Port Bruce Stadial, and Kettleby Till, from the Port Huron Stadial. These are overlain by kames and kame slopes, which are the dominant topographical features in the area, on the northern slopes of the Oak Ridges Moraine. It is an "excellent representation of kame moraine features", which are uncommon in the region. It is in the East Holland River subwatershed.

The site also demarcates the southernmost advance of the Lake Simcoe sublobe during the Port Bruce Stadial, though most sediments were deposited by the Lake Ontario lobe.
