= Eakles Mills, Maryland =

Unincorporated community in Maryland, United States

Eakles Mill, Maryland
- Unincorporated community
- Location within Maryland Location within the United States
- Coordinates: 39°28′05″N 77°41′05″W
- Country: United States
- State: Maryland
- County: Washington

Area
  - Total: 0.085 sq mi (0.22 km^{2})
  - Land: 0.085 sq mi (0.22 km^{2})
  - Water: 0 sq mi (0.00 km^{2})
- Elevation: 430 ft (130 m)

Population (2020)
  - Total: 26
  - Density: 306.2/sq mi (118.22/km^{2})
- Time zone: UTC-5 (Eastern (EST))
  - Summer (DST): UTC-4 (EDT)
- Area codes: 240 & 301
- GNIS feature ID: 590121

Eakles Mills (also known as Eakles Mill) is an unincorporated community in Washington County, Maryland, United States. Its population was 26 as of the 2020 census. Snively Farm was listed on the National Register of Historic Places in 1979.

== History ==
Located in southeastern Washington County Maryland, Eakle's Mill is a remnant of a typical 19th century rural farm community. Originally surrounded by farms and orchards, which provided abundant jobs during the manual labor era prior to mechanization, Eakle's Mill as other similar sites, became a thriving village. Originating on the lands of Conrad Snivley and Andrew Putman who arrived in the area during the influx of (mostly) German immigrants in the 1760s, the community is on the road originally leading from Pleasant Valley and Crampton's Gap. Putman purchased a property named “Partnership” from Josiah Chapline, who was disposing of the lands of his late father Moses Chapline who was the original settler in the 1740s. Putman added to his lands, which after his death were bought by son in-law Christian Wyandt. The village gained prominence in the 1870s with the construction of the Hagerstown branch of the B&O Railroad. Jeremiah Snyder founded a Sunday school in the schoolhouse in 1877, which spawned the Eakle's Mill United Brethren Church in 1887. Located some distance behind the (abandoned) church and not associated with it is the Keedy family graveyard.

Early AME Church circuit riding minister Thomas Henry used the Jacob Snivley farm at Eakle's Mill as his base of operations for several years during the 1850s and speaks highly of Mr. & Mrs Snivley's hospitality towards him. The United Brethren in Christ, of which the Snivley's were members, was the overwhelmingly dominant religion locally. A sect that was philosophically opposed to slavery and so, is thought to be a contributing factor enabling the sizable free African American population living in the surrounding area decades prior to the civil war. Once home to a mill, store, school and church, no public entities remain in the village. The railroad ceased operation in the 1970s.

== Geography ==
According to the U.S. Census Bureau, the community has an area of 0.085 square miles (0.22 km^{2}), all land.

== Demographics ==
Historical population
Census	Pop.	Note	%±
2020	26		—
U.S. Decennial Census
