= Oak Ridges Moraine Foundation =

The Oak Ridges Moraine Foundation (ORMF) is a non-profit organization based in Newmarket, Ontario, Canada. It was founded in 2002 as a governing body dedicated to the enhancement and preservation of the Oak Ridges Moraine as a healthy and vibrant ecosystem.

== History ==
The Oak Ridges Moraine stretches 160 kilometres from the Trent River in the east to the Niagara Escarpment in the west. It is more than 90 per cent privately owned with a population of approximately 250,000 to 300,000 people. It crosses 32 municipalities, supplies drinking water to more than 250,000 individuals and supports related agricultural, industrial, commercial and recreational uses.

In 2001 the Ontario government recognized that in order to preserve the Moraine’s health and diversity there was a need for provincial regulation over its many complex land use issues. On May 17, 2001, The Oak Ridges Moraine Protection Act was passed followed by the Oak Ridges Moraine Conservation Act on December 13, 2001. Less than a year later, in April 2002, the Oak Ridges Moraine Conservation Plan (ORMCP) was passed. In the same year, the ORMF was created. It received CA$15 million from the provincial government to fund projects related to the moraine and provide educational resources about it. It also raised CA$35.8 million from fundraising events from inception to 2011, which was used to fund another 177 projects.

The ORMF has an independent board of directors that consists of individuals nominated by Ontario Nature, the Nature Conservancy of Canada, Conservation Ontario, the Government of Canada, the Government of Ontario, and the Association of Municipalities of Ontario. The Foundation Chair is Caroline Schultz, Executive Director of Ontario Nature.

== Accomplishments ==
Since established in 2002 the ORMF has distributed in excess of $14 million in grants to 177 projects and leveraged, in collaboration with Moraine partners, an additional $35.8 million for Moraine-related projects. Of the money distributed 41 per cent was dedicated to land securement, 37 per cent to stewardship, 12 per cent to public education, 7 per cent to the expansion of the Oak Ridges Trail, and 3 per cent to research.

In addition, on September 15, 2016 the dedication was held for the official opening of the western trail head in Mono Township which replaced the original western terminus dedication in spring of 2012. In keeping with their mandate "To build and maintain a public hiking trail system on the Oak Ridges moraine, off-road where possible, and To organize and promote hiking on this trail system, and To encourage responsible stewardship of the Moraine's natural environment" the Oak Ridges Trail Association was able to secure part of the Bruce Trails original side trails as part of their main trail. This enabled less highway and road hiking into the more favourable forested areas. Working with partners to establish a trail that continued across the entire Moraine was one of the ORMF's initial goals. The completion of the Trail is also significant as it meets one of the ORMCP's main objectives of a continuous east to west trail along the entire length of the Moraine. However, continued stakeholder and landowner engagement is required to further more off-road sections of this trail system.

== Future of the ORMF ==
The ORMF’s granting function is currently suspended; however, it is dedicated to continue its work with the government, Moraine stakeholders and the public to create a lasting legacy for the Moraine.

On Friday, February 27, 2015, the Province announced and formally launched the co-ordinated review of the Growth Plan, Greenbelt Plan, Oak Ridges Moraine Conservation Plan and Niagara Escarpment Plan. The review will include two formal stages of public consultation. To facilitate the first stage of the review, the province has released a discussion document – Our Region, Our Community, Our Home, containing guiding questions for comments to assist in the development of proposed amendments to the four Plans.

ORMF is working to prepare for the review and together with your efforts will help the Province make informed decisions about any changes required to the ORMCP to ensure it continues to protect and enhance the environment and water resources on the Oak Ridges Moraine. The Recommendations of the ORMF on the ORMCP can be viewed in their document "Sustaining Our Environment, Planning For Our Future 2015 ORMF Recommendations Report"

In order to further provide long-term funding for ongoing program initiatives the ORMF is continuing to seek additional funding from the Provincial and Federal Governments.
