= Politics of the Oak Ridges Moraine =

The politics of the Oak Ridges Moraine in southern Ontario, Canada, have centred on the question of how to preserve this extensive natural resource that is increasingly threatened by human modification. Although preservation of the moraine was first suggested in the 1940s, and intermittently over the subsequent fifty years, it was not until 1991 that the issue achieved prominence in political discourse. For the ensuing decade, use of the moraine was hotly contested between the interests of local residents, developers and environmentalists.

On December 14, 2001 legislation was enacted, along with a provincial land use plan for the Oak Ridges Moraine. However, it seems clear that regulation, alone, is insufficient to preserving these valuable lands. Implementing the plan has required "political will, an engaged and informed public, and... broad based private and public partnerships." Monitoring of the Moraine project by citizens and environmental organizations, along with credible ecological information are essential to its continued preservation.

== Political action ==
The Oak Ridges Moraine began to come to public awareness in the late 1980s. The establishment, in 1989, of the Save the Oak Ridges Moraine (STORM) Coalition contributed to a growing sense among local residents that action needed to be taken to save the moraine. The Government of Ontario created the Oak Ridges Moraine Technical Working Committee in June 1991 with the joint membership of the Ministry of Natural Resources, the Ministry of the Environment and the Ministry of Municipal Affairs. The STORM Coalition played a significant role in the committee's work. The committee's aim was to create a regional planning strategy to coordinate the activities of various regional and municipal governments with jurisdiction over parts of the moraine. This multi-stakeholder process produced a comprehensive long-term strategy for the Moraine in 1994. However the strategy was subsequently dismissed in favour of local government administration of the affected lands. This led to intense development on some portions of the moraine. Most of this development was suburban detached single-family dwellings with road networks to accommodate them. In particular, Vaughan, Richmond Hill and Newmarket experienced significant growth in the 1990s.

In early 1999, the Oak Ridges Moraine became a sensitive political issue; developers targeted Richmond Hill for large subdivisions on the moraine, which would house over 100,000 people. Environmental groups began a media campaign to raise public awareness of the moraine, referring to it as the "rain barrel of Ontario". Public opposition to the developments grew quickly, and the issue was transferred to the Ontario Municipal Board (OMB) in 2000.

Environmentalists, often critical of the OMB for allegedly fast-tracking developments over the concerns of municipal governments, again raised the issue in the media. The dispute remained unresolved until May 2001, when the provincial Conservative government announced a six-month moratorium on moraine development. A panel was formed to create a land-use plan consistent with the current Smart Growth policy. The plan was released in October 2001, and was both praised and condemned. It became the basis for the Oak Ridges Moraine Conservation Act, dividing the area into four zones of increasingly stringent controls on development. Under the Act, only eight percent of the moraine can be developed, and only in lands designated as "settlement areas".

== The Bayview Avenue link ==
Throughout the process, debate continued about the link of Bayview Avenue closing a gap from Stouffville Road, in Richmond Hill, to Bloomington Road in Aurora. The land on which the link would pass had been clear-cut in 1999, after the Government of Ontario Ministry of Environment approved the link in 1998. The road's construction began in September 2001, though environmental groups had entered into legal procedures to block it. The Ontario Court of Appeals rejected the request; York Region officials agreed to resolve some of the concerns that were raised.

As a result, a bridge was added to the plan, spanning a 70 m section of a dry ravine near Stouffville Road. Moreover, five salamander tunnels were added to the design, and were built in September 2002. The Bayview link was officially opened on November 18, 2002.

== North Pickering Land Exchange ==
During the provincial election of 2003, the Liberal Party of Ontario promised to terminate development on the moraine as part of its election campaign. Once elected, the party failed to deliver on that promise, as a development in the northern part of Richmond Hill consisting of over 6600 housing units continued. The government, in its attempt to halt other nearby developments, proposed the North Pickering Land Exchange. Discussed as early as November 2001, it involved exchanging government-owned public lands in North Pickering for privately owned lands on the Oak Ridges Moraine in Richmond Hill and Uxbridge.

The exchange settled outstanding disputes being considered by the OMB involving moraine lands in Richmond Hill and Uxbridge. Lands acquired by the developers had been previously identified as high-growth urban areas in regional and local Official Plans, often referred to as Seaton. However, the process by which the exchange was settled angered environmentalists, who considered the lack of transparency in the process a betrayal: Josh Matlow, founder of Earthroots, accused the Tories of making a "sleazy, secret, sweetheart deal" with developers.

Moreover, the swap allowed the development of 600 acres (2.4 km^{2}) on the moraine; the northern Richmond Hill development ceased operations for several days after the 2003 election, but resumed soon thereafter. The development of MacLeod's Landing, as it is now known, was completed in late 2005. One of the developers, Brookfield Homes, had used the Oak Ridges Moraine Conservation Plan as a marketing device, claiming that "as one of the last approved developments on the Oak Ridges Moraine, rest assured that the preservation of the natural landscape that surrounds you is forever." The other developers of the community were Kaitlin Group and Aspen Ridge Homes. The site was desirable for development because of the presence of Phillips Lake and a dozen other small kettle lakes, regular features throughout the Oak Ridges Moraine.

== The Big Pipe ==
See also King City: The Big Pipe.

The political struggle regarding the moraine continues. The community of King City in King Township has been embroiled in a decade-long argument about replacing septic systems with a sewerage connection to the Durham-York Sewage System. Proponents of the link claim that the septic systems leak, endangering the subterranean aquifers of the moraine. Opponents claim that such a link would enable explosive growth in the small community, which would be detrimental to the preservation of the moraine. Construction of the link began in early 2005, creating the main sewer trunk from King City to Oak Ridges along King Road, connecting to the existing system near Yonge Street.

The connection to King City, despite the appellation Big Pipe, is relatively small compared to the overall system expansion governed by York Region, which has also been labeled The Big Pipe. The construction of this north–south extension to the system requires daily pumping of 30 million litres of water from subterranean aquifers, over its projected five-year construction schedule (lasting to early 2008). This has upset environmentalists greatly, and disturbed some residents of Markham who rely on wells as their source of water. These residents were the first to be affected by construction because of their proximity to the initial area of development.

The $800 million project is divided into several phases, creating fourteen new links in the system. The system trunks, consisting of 2.7 metre concrete pipes, will collectively transport 740 million litres of raw sewage daily from York and Durham to treatment facilities in Pickering. On October 2, 2004, the province ordered a full environmental assessment of the Southeast Collector (in the Rouge Valley) and the Upper Leslie Trunk; a further 44 environmental conditions were placed on four other links in the new system.

When complete, the regional Big Pipe will extend from the eastern edge of Lake Simcoe in the north, to treatment plants near Lake Ontario in the south, running along Leslie Street. It will twin with the near-capacity Yonge Street trunk, increasing capacity sufficiently to serve the region's growth until 2030. Intended to cover major growth areas in the eastern part of the region, it will connect directly to emerging developments from Markham to Holland Landing. Moreover, new connections to rural communities will be created; King City is connected to the existing system, whereas Stouffville will connect to the new pipe.

Construction of the extensions have been contentious. York Region has been accused of failing to conduct a proper environmental assessment for the expansion. Ontario's environmental commissioner Gord Miller noted such concerns: "One of the most significant problems with this project is the lack of a full environmental assessment. Officials never looked at the full picture and the impact it has on the Oak Ridges Moraine and surrounding communities."

As pumping of the aquifers continued throughout 2002, residents in nearby areas complained about dropping water levels in their wells, as well as dirty water; the range of affected areas increased with the total volume of water pumped from the aquifer, some as far away as 10 km. Environmentalists claim that continued pumping may jeopardize the aquifer system, so much so that it may reverse its flow in some areas. York Region's planners counter that by indicating that all water that is pumped is re-introduced into nearby streams after being warmed (aquifer water from 50 m below ground level is very cold), and will not affect the aquifer system. Unfortunately, there is no scientific evidence for either claim. Environmentalists have observed, though, that water isn't heated evenly, often resulting in the scalding and death of many fish. Also, according to The Globe and Mail, "York Region has acknowledged that the first phase of building the 16th Avenue sewer line, finished in 2003, had a negative impact on local watersheds."

In late October 2005, Toronto City Council voted 34–3 to join an environmental coalition attempting to block the construction of the extension. The city, southern neighbour to York Region, allocated $100,000 to conduct a study of the impact of the system on the city's watersheds, specifically the Rouge River Valley, and requested the provincial Environment Minister to defer the approval for construction until the study is complete.

== Lessons learned in watershed preservation ==
The action to save the moraine yields insights into the state of sustainable land use planning and smart growth in watershed protection. In its 2002 case study, the International Association for Great Lakes Research noted that it was “only through citizen initiatives, shaped and focused by environmental groups, that serious debate, and eventual formation of a land use plan, took place." As the struggle to save the moraine shows, significant political pressure is necessary to overcome the obstacles to controls: municipalities dedicated to encouraging growth and higher level governments reluctant to intervene. The importance of access to good science and policy information is crucial, as is the need for ongoing monitoring and vigilance."
