= Snively Farm =

- U.S. National Register of Historic Places
- Location within Maryland Location within the United States
- Location: North of Eakles Mills on Mt. Briar Rd., Eakles Mills, Maryland
- Coordinates: 39°28′16″N 77°41′19.5″W
- Area: 15 acres (6.1 ha)
- NRHP reference No.: 79001144
- Added to NRHP: September 24, 1979

Snively Farm is a historic home and farm located near Eakles Mills, Washington County, Maryland, United States. It is a two-story, three-bay 18th century log structure with an exposed basement at the front elevation on fieldstone foundations. The home features a two-story, three-bay rear addition built in the late 18th or early 19th century with a one-story, two-bay stone kitchen. The property includes a stone springhouse and a frame butchering or outkitchen with a massive stone exterior chimney.

The Snively Farm was listed on the National Register of Historic Places in 1979.
