= Save the Oak Ridges Moraine =

Save the Oak Ridges Moraine (STORM) is a coalition of citizen's groups and individuals dedicated to preserving the ecologically sensitive Oak Ridges Moraine in Ontario, Canada. Formed in 1989, its primary goal has been to lobby the Government of Ontario to create legislation to protect the moraine.

The coalition was founded when two groups (one from Peterborough that was supporting a group in Durham Region, and one in King Township) discovered that they had the same name (STORM), and networked with other local groups to organize a first coalition meeting. The brief that the Peterborough group prepared had a significant impact on the Environmental Assessment Advisory Committee who held a hearing to hear perspectives on the disputed land use proposal near Kendall in Durham.

STORM has played an important role in triggering political action to preserve the Oak Ridges Moraine. Soon after its formation, it raised the profile of the Moraine at both the local and provincial levels, causing the provincial government to declare an "expression of provincial interest" in the Moraine in 1990.

STORM was appointed as a member of the government-sponsored Oak Ridges Moraine Technical Working Committee. In addition to STORM, membership on the committee included: Regional Municipalities of Durham, Peel and York, MNR, MMAH, MOE, Toronto and Region Conservation Authority (TRCA), Ganaraska Region Conservation Authority (GRCA), Conservation Council of Ontario (CCO), Urban Development Institute (UDI), Aggregate Producers Association of Ontario (APAO), and Federation of Ontario Naturalists (FON). The committee operated from 1991 to 1994. Its task was to develop a long-term preservation strategy for the moraine. The committee's final report, submitted to the province in 1994, was never implemented. Instead, the province expanded the powers of the municipalities in administration of the lands that were the subject of the committee's report.
