= Glen Echo Park, Ontario =

Naturist club in King, Ontario, Canada

Coordinates: 43.968202°N 79.620209°W

Glen Echo Park was a naturist club opened in 1955 by Marie and Eddie Todorowsky in King, Ontario. When it closed in 2009, it was the oldest nudist camp in Ontario. The camp featured a children's swimming pool, a playground, a five-unit motel and a shower area. In 1974, a 10,000-square-foot (930 m^{2}) clubhouse was constructed for complete year-round use.

In April 2009, after years of trying to sell the camp to nudists, the owners sold the property; in August 2009, it was announced that the camp would close down in October 2009 as it was bought by a private buyer for personal use.

The announcement that the club would close effective October 1, 2009 only gave members about a month's notice. The news of the sale and closure came as a surprise to the membership because they had been given repeated assurances that the park would be sold to someone who would maintain it as a nudist club. Because some had significant investments in elaborate cabins that could not easily be moved, many members felt betrayed.

Members fought to keep the park open. A September 2009 Landlord and Tenant Board (LTB) ruling gave the members an additional year before they would be required to vacate. This ruling was subsequently overturned when the LTB ruled the act did not apply.
