= Happy Valley, King, Ontario =

Happy Valley
- Unincorporated rural community
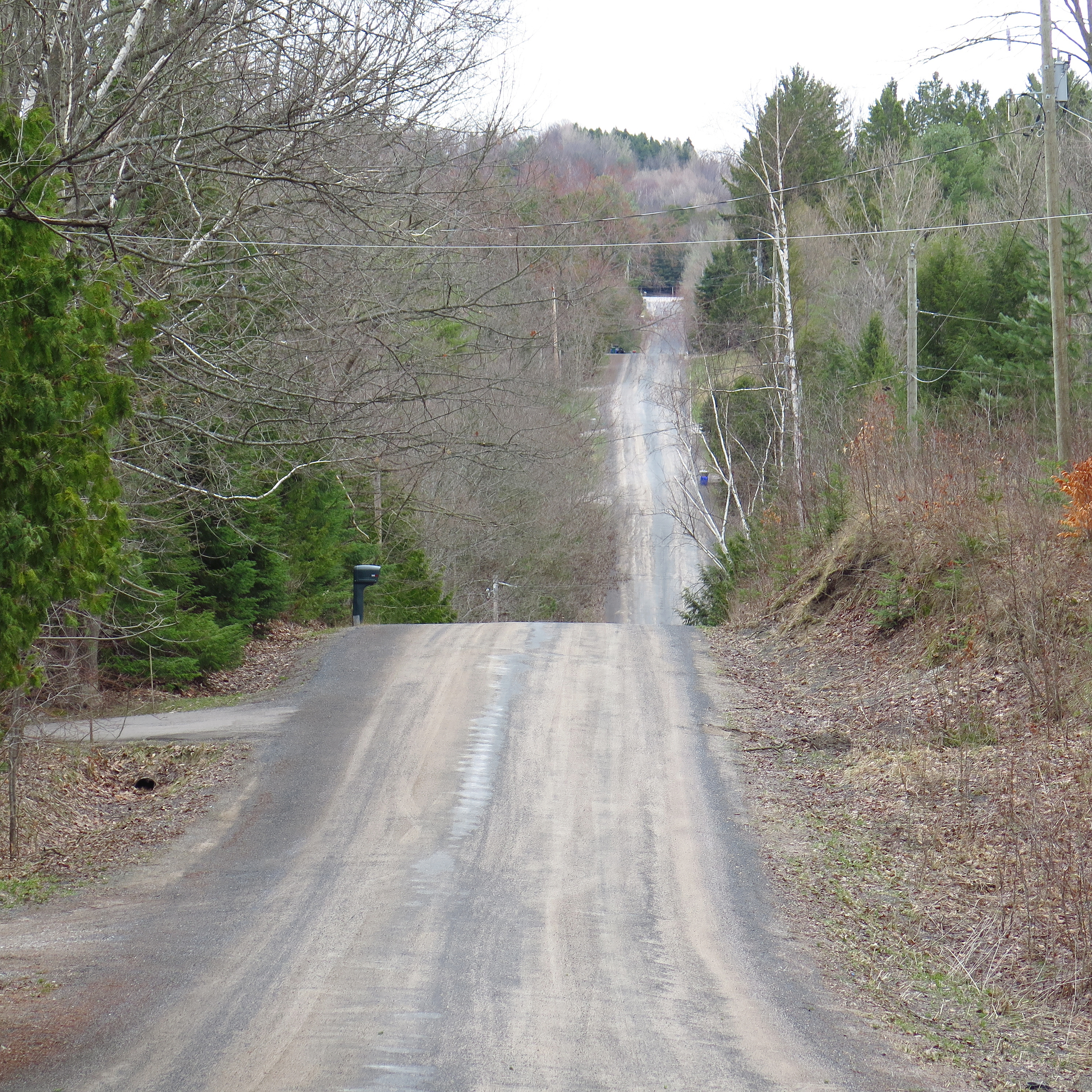
- Looking east on Churchill Avenue in Happy Valley

- Location within Canada Location within Ontario
- Coordinates: 43°58′45″N 79°35′46″W
- Country: Canada
- Province: Ontario
- Regional Municipality: York
- Township: King
- Time zone: UTC-5 (Eastern (EST))
  - Summer (DST): UTC-4 (EDT)
- GNBC Code: FBLSE

Happy Valley is an unincorporated rural community in King Township, York Regional Municipality, Ontario, Canada.

== Geography ==
Happy Valley Forest is a 6.48 km^{2} (2.50 sq mi) provincially significant ecological area located near the settlement. It is classified as an Area of Natural and Scientific Interest by the Ontario Ministry of Natural Resources.
