= Area of Natural and Scientific Interest =

An Area of Natural and Scientific Interest (or ANSI) is an official designation by the provincial Government of Ontario in Canada applied to contiguous geographical regions within the province that have geological or ecological features which are significantly representative provincially, regionally, or locally. Some sites with this designation were assessed through the International Biological Program between 1964 and 1974. As of 2014, over 1000 sites covering 460,000 hectares (4,600 km^{2}) have been designated in the province.

The Conservation Land Tax Incentive Program (CLTIP) is a program offered to landowners whose property includes ANSI land to voluntarily protect that land in exchange for a property tax reduction.

== Types ==
Three separate designations exist: Life Sciences (or Life Sciences ANSI, or ANSI-LS), a region exhibiting ecological features; Earth Sciences (or Earth Sciences ANSI, or ANSI-ES), a region exhibiting geological features; and Candidate, an area under consideration for such a designation. The latter are sites that the Ministry of Natural Resources has "identified and recommended for protection", but have not yet been formally confirmed, and were previously referred to as nominated ANSIs.These cannot be classified as provincially significant until they are confirmed. Provincially significant ANSIs are "the best representative sites that do not occur within national parks, provincial parks, or conservation reserves". These may also be nationally or internationally significant features.

An Earth Science area is one in which the representative feature was created by geologic processes and consists of the physical elements of a natural landscape, such as the bedrock, landforms, and fossils. These are identified by lithology, paleontology, and geomorphology, then classified "into geological themes" according to age, stratigraphy, topography, and other characteristics.

A Life Science area is one in which the representative feature consists of the biodiversity of the area and its landscapes, and has not been affected by human development; this includes all indigenous plants and animals, forests and valleys, prairies and savannahs, wetlands, alvars, and bodies of water.

Current ANSI identification is based on ecoregions and ecodistricts, and finer resolution is used to determine particular features and areas, such as a landform.

=== Evaluation ===
There are five criteria on which a candidate ANSI is evaluated. Representation and condition are assessed at the landscape level, and diversity, ecological functions, and special feature are applied to each site.

The representative features for an ANSI in an ecodistrict are the geologic themes for an Earth Science ANSI or the landforms and vegetation for a Life Science ANSI. The diversity of such representative features deemed to be high quality for the site is also important, as those with greater heterogeneity support a greater breadth of species. The condition of the site considers the extent of "human-induced disturbances" resulting from past and current land use, and the ecological condition of a site "helps to determine its significance within the ecodistrict".

A fourth criterion is the ecological and hydrological features of the site, its size and shape, and proximity and connections to other sites, and also considers associations and effects on the watershed in which it exists. The final criterion is consideration for other characteristics, such as the presence of species at risk, unique or important local habitats, atypical features, and its value as an educational or scientific resource.

During identification, scientific research regarding a potential ANSI site's significance is collected and interpreted, and the site's boundaries are determined. Confirmation of the site as an ANSI requires notification of affected parties, such as landowners and municipal planning departments, and obtaining approval for the designation. If site access is required during identification or for determining boundaries, the Ministry of Natural Resources must notify any affected party and obtain permission to access it.

=== Categories ===
The category of ANSI (provincial, regional, or local) is determined by the five criteria evaluated during identification. A provincially significant ANSI is one for which the site's representative natural features or landscapes are amongst the "best examples" of that feature in the province. These have been further protected by the provincial Planning Act and Natural Heritage policies since 1996, and by the Oak Ridges Moraine Conservation Plan, the Niagara Escarpment Plan, and the Greenbelt Plan (such as for the Golden Horseshoe Greenbelt or the Ottawa Greenbelt).

Regionally significant ANSIs also satisfy the five criteria, and are protected in some parts of the province. Locally significant ANSIs satisfy most of the five evaluation criteria, but are already adequately represented by another ANSI or protected area within the province or the ecodistrict.

== Management ==
Regions classified as Areas of Natural and Scientific Interest are subject to certain management constraints. Ultimately, land management and stewardship is a municipal responsibility, so that "decisions on the appropriate levels of protection and land uses are the responsibility of the local municipality". Each area is specified to be either regionally or provincially significant for its representative feature.

The Ministry of Natural Resources recommends that development on land adjacent to ANSI areas should consider potential negative impacts within 50m of an Earth Science feature or 120m of a Life Science feature. Municipalities may define adjacent lands to exclude some of these areas, but the development plans must "demonstrate that no negative impacts on the natural features or their ecological functions will occur".

Consideration is made for hydrological and topographical features, connectivity of wildlife corridors, and soil conditions. Development is deemed suitable on adjacent lands if it conserves "topography, stratigraphic exposures and other geologically defining features", and must be consistent with policies 2.1.4(e) and 2.1.6 of the Provincial Policy Statement 2005.

== Status ==
In the Mixedwood Plains ecozone of Southern Ontario, most land is privately owned and hence cannot be protected as a provincial park, nature reserve, or conservation area. Some of these ANSI lands are held by conservation groups, including Nature Conservancy of Canada and Ontario Nature. This also requires that multiple Life Science ANSIs to represent the features associated to a landform on a landscape fragmented by development.
