= Oak Ridges Moraine =

Glacial till landform above Lake Ontario, Canada

Coordinates: 44°03′N 78°52′W

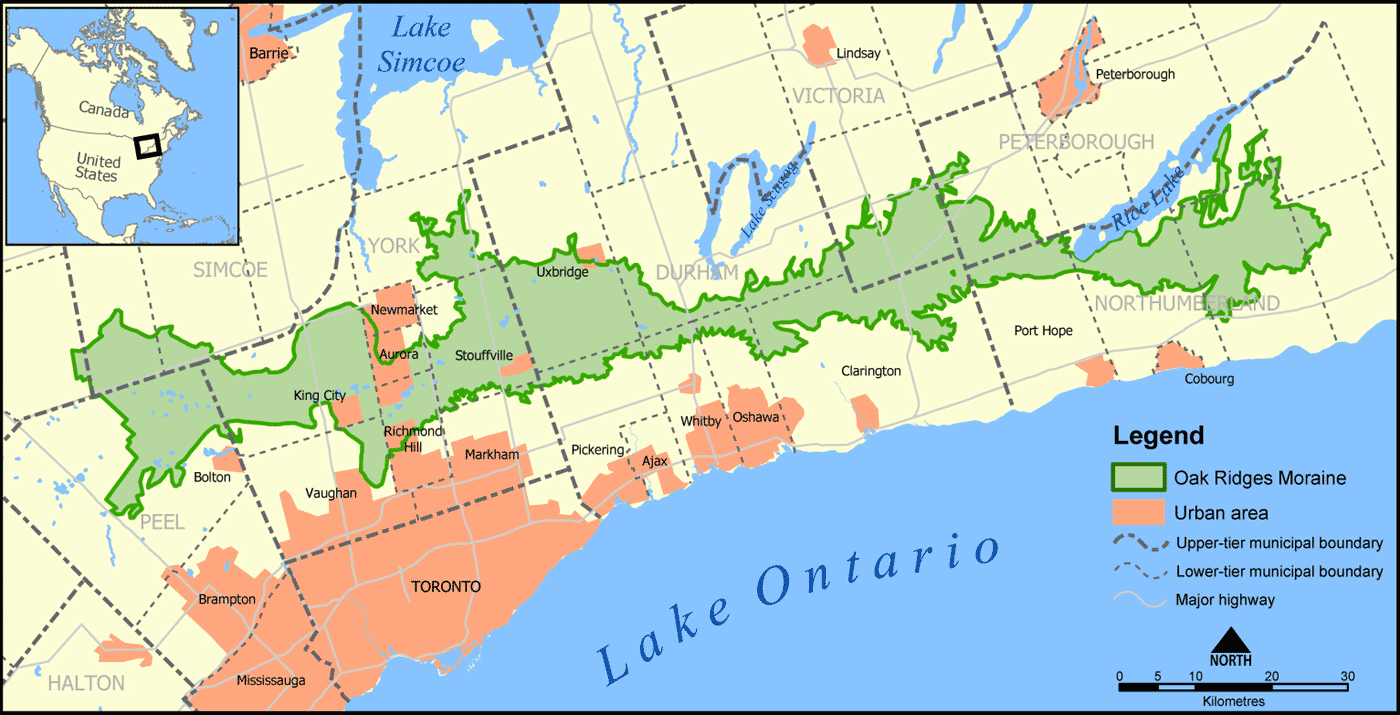
The Oak Ridges Moraine.

The Oak Ridges Moraine is an ecologically important geological landform in the Mixedwood Plains of south-central Ontario, Canada. The moraine covers a geographic area of 1,900 square kilometres (730 sq mi) between Caledon and Rice Lake, near Peterborough. One of the most significant landforms in southern Ontario, the moraine gets its name from the rolling hills and river valleys extending 160 km (99 mi) east from the Niagara Escarpment to Rice Lake, formed 12,000 years ago by advancing and retreating glaciers (see geological origins, below) during the last glaciation period. Below the approximately 200 metre thick glacial derived sediments of the moraine lies thick bedrock successions of Precambrian rocks and up to 200 metres of Ordovician aged rock (see geology below), capped by a regional unconformity of erosion and non-deposition to the Quaternary period. Rivers and lakes scatter the landscape and are important for creating habitat for the rich diversity of species of animals, trees and shrubbery (see ecology). These are also the supply of fresh water to aquifers in the moraine through complex subterranean connections (see hydrology). Construction development nearby, and with expansion of communities around the moraine in need of potable water, it is a contested site in Ontario, since it stands in the path of major urban development (see political action). Conservation of the moraine is thus an important step for keeping aquifers in a safe drinkable condition while also protecting the natural ecosystems surrounding and within the moraine (see conservation). This region has been subject to multiple decades of scientific research to study the origins of formation, and how early communities used the land. A larger focus currently is how to source potable water without removing the aquifer entirely (see research section).

== Physiography ==
The Oak Ridges Moraine is a pair of large ridges composed of four elevated wedges. It is bounded to the west by the Niagara Escarpment, a cuesta which was critical to the formation of the moraine, and to the east by the Trent River and Rice Lake. The four wedges (Albion, Uxbridge, Pontypool and Rice Lake from west to east) formed in stages, though some synchronous formation also occurred at an early period of formation. The moraine peaks at the Uxbridge wedge, generally rising from east to west, a result of the moraine's west-to-east formation. That is, the western portion of the moraine received earlier and more frequent sedimentary deposition than the eastern portion, as the ice lobes which controlled the moraine's eastern formation slowly retreated. The Rice Lake wedge is separated from the other wedges where the Oak Ridges Moraine intersects Rice Lake. As the moraine is a local topographic high, streams originating in the lower Oak Ridges Moraine sediment packages, by groundwater movement, either flow south into Lake Ontario or north toward Lake Simcoe or Georgian Bay through large river valleys carved during melting of glaciers.

To the north are drumlinized uplands, referred to as the Peterborough drumlin field, which may continue south of Rice Lake and the Rice Lake wedge. Near the Rice Lake wedge and Peterborough drumlin field are a couple of low-lying terrain plains and small hills on bedrock basement.

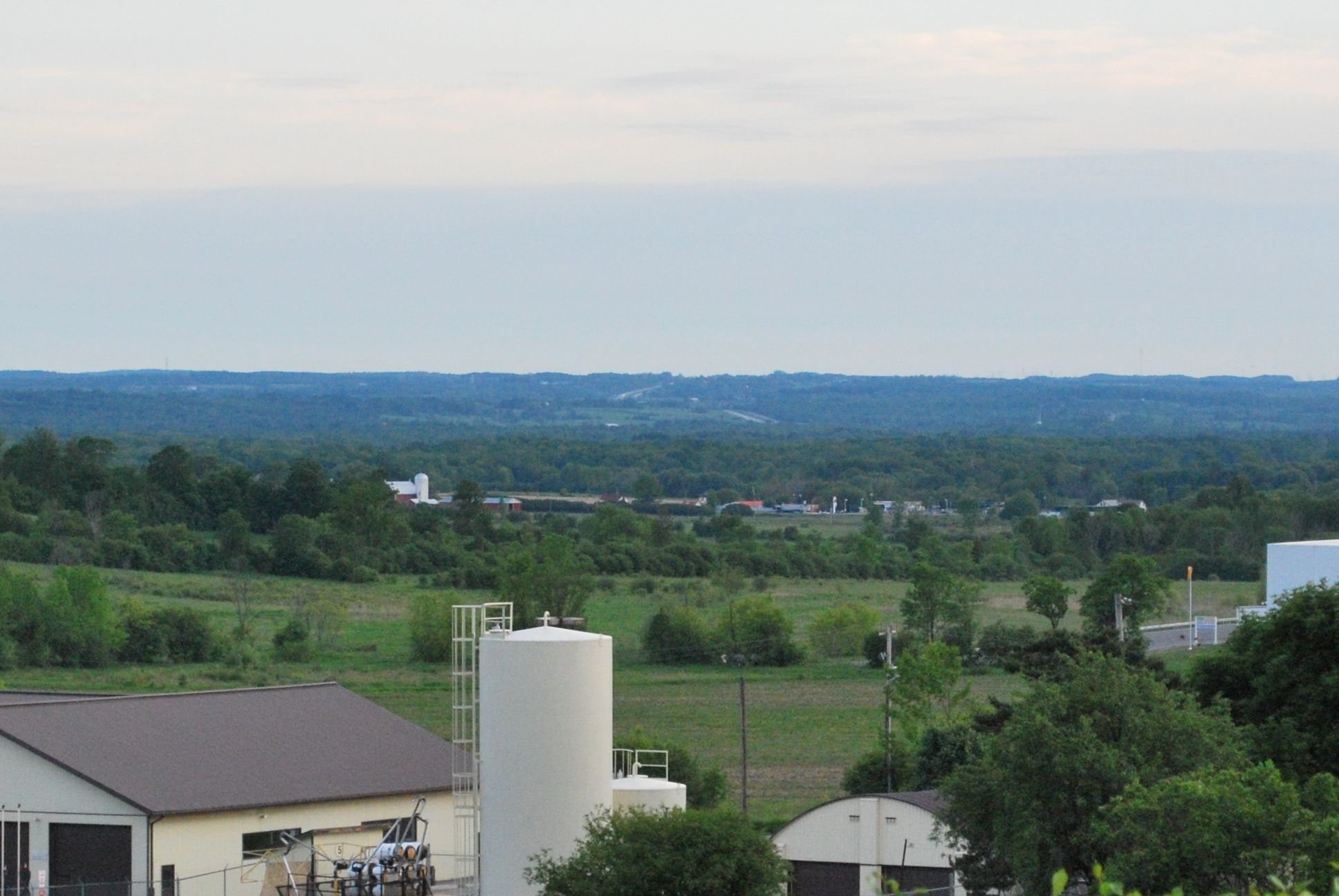
Looking southwest at The Oak Ridges Moraine from the North Monaghan Parkway in Peterborough. Highway 115 is visible in the centre of the picture as it ascends the Moraine.

== Geological origins ==
The Oak Ridges Moraine probably formed in the Late Wisconsin glacial period. Ice melt from the Niagara Escarpment flowed into the western boundaries of the moraine, wherein conduits beneath the ice expanded to form a west-to-east passage between the main Laurentide Ice Sheet and a mass of ice in the Lake Ontario basin.

Stratified sediment was deposited rapidly on the high-relief erosional surface. Up to 150 metres (490 ft) in some areas, the deposits occurred on surfaces defined by highly eroded channels and drumlin uplands. The channel tunnels were primarily created by the erosion from glacial rivers, a typical process before moraine formation.

Characteristic of this moraine is the transition of deposition layers from glaciofluvial to glaciolacustrine. Sedimentary glaciofluvial areas form the core of the Oak Ridges Moraine, though restricted to subglacial cavity fills of confined subaqueous fans. Overlaying this core is a glaciolacustrine sedimentary layer that is younger and topographically lower, principally in the delta and basin areas of the moraine.

In the late stages of its development, random unstratified accumulation (known as diamicton) occurred along the ice margins. Whereas the glacial river deposits were more substantial by volume, the diamicton deposits represent a greater portion of the moraine's exposed surface. Research suggests that sedimentation occurred in a west to east sequence along the four main sedimentary wedges: Albion, Uxbridge, Pontypool and Rice Lake. The wedges may have formed in a relatively short period of time, perhaps no more than a few hundred years, as indicated by the annual deposition cycles in glacial lakes (known as varves) within the moraine sediments. However, the lowest beds in the moraine may have experienced synchronous sedimentation.

== Geology ==
=== Glacial sediments ===
In the area of the Oak Ridges Moraine, glacially derived sediments, mainly of Pleistocene age, may overlie a regional unconformity and lower Newmarket till, up to 200 metres thick in some places. Extensive research in the moraine area indicate there may be 6 different periods of sedimentation from the onset of glaciation. There are lower deposits of sand, silt and clay, which rest directly above the regional time unconformity up to 100 metres (330 ft) thick in some areas. These lower deposits are thought to be proglacial lake derived, and contain from bottom to top: York Till, Don Interglacial beds, Scarborough Formation, Sunnybrook Till and Thorncliffe Formation. Next comes the Newmarket Till of stony, silty sand and sandy-silt diamicton ranging from 5 to 50 metres (16 to 164 ft) thick and is thought to extend southward under Lake Ontario. Cutting into the Newmarket Till is another regional unconformity, which led to coarse grained channel fill sediments. Some channel fills are 10 to 25 metres of gravels or 10-to-75-metre (33 to 246 ft) sands that decrease in grain size during later deposition following a period of slowing meltwater runoff. Channel fill sediments comprise the base of Oak Ridges Moraine sediments, atop the unconformity. Lower deposits of the Oak Ridges Moraine sediments stratigraphic package start as coarse sands and gravels whereas upper sediments are interbedded fine sands and silts with channel fill. There may also be sequences of sediments decreasing in size from medium sands to silts and clays up to ten's of metres thick. Above these sediments lie clayey-silt to silt till of the Halton Till, at thicknesses reaching 20 metres (66 ft). The Halton Till is not present over the entire expanse of the moraine, cropping out locally and interspersed.

Glacial lake sediments cap the entire sequence of Oak Ridges Moraine sediment stratigraphy in the region, namely from two glacial lakes, Lake Algonquin and Lake Iroquois. The main depositional ingredient from these lakes is silt with some clay content, as layers of 2 to 20 metres (6.6 to 65.6 ft) thick in places. Glacial sediments are subject to erosional forces and valley cutting processes, removing previously laid sediments and placing them further along the river path.

=== Unconformity ===
At the Oak Ridges Moraine system, rocks from the Ordovician Period underlie the post-glacial sediment and are a large part of the bedrock geology, aside from the presence of some older basement rock beneath. From the basement rocks to the overlying stratigraphic successions is an unconformity (a gap in the geologic record) where many millions of years of depositional or crystalline record are erased (mostly Silurian to Pleistocene rocks) by regional erosion processes and continent building phases. A large time gap is important in this context to correlate where and when this event occurred with respect to both local and surrounding geology of the lithostratigraphic and geographical record. Cause of this stratigraphic gap may originate from a couple large scale meltwater events, the older Algonquin and younger Ontarian erosional floods from melting glaciers of the Late Wisconsinan glaciation.

=== Paleozoic bedrock ===
Basement layers are composed of Early Ordovician aged dolostone as a first sequence only to be stripped away by erosion in the Middle Ordovician. Sea transgression during continent reformation in the Middle Ordovician brought in a second sequence of deposition as clastic and carbonate sediments above this new unconformity. A third depositional sequence is found in the Late Ordovician, separated from the Middle Ordovician by local erosion and clastic sediments, consists of a shale base topped with more shale interbedded with limestone and calcareous siltstones. Above this is yet another unconformity, this time due to sea regression in the Late Ordovician to Early Silurian time. Large gaps in deposition from the Early Silurian through Mesozoic time allowed large scale erosion to occur in this geographic region, to the onset of Quaternary glaciation and subsequent sediment deposition. A 1997 report from the Geological Survey of Canada estimates the bedrock thickness to range between 50 and 500 metres (160 and 1,640 ft) thick, below approximately 200 metres (660 ft) of Pleistocene aged sediments. This broad range of thickness is representative of the unequal effects of regional erosion, uplift, sedimentary deposition and continental processes (tectonics, building and destroying of continents).

=== Precambrian bedrock ===
Rocks from the Grenville Province of Precambrian age lie below Ordovician aged limestones and shales in much of the Oak Ridges Moraine area. These come from a period of continental scale orogeny in eastern North America about 1.2 to 1.3 billion years ago. This area of the Grenville Province is mainly composed of metamorphosed gneiss and mylonite, while also including intrusions of granitic composition as well. Both the metamorphic and igneous rocks are able to better withstand erosional forces from the advancing ice sheets compared to some softer rock types. Softer metamorphic rocks of the Precambrian basement include marbles or metaturbidites, both from sedimentary origin.

== Ecology ==
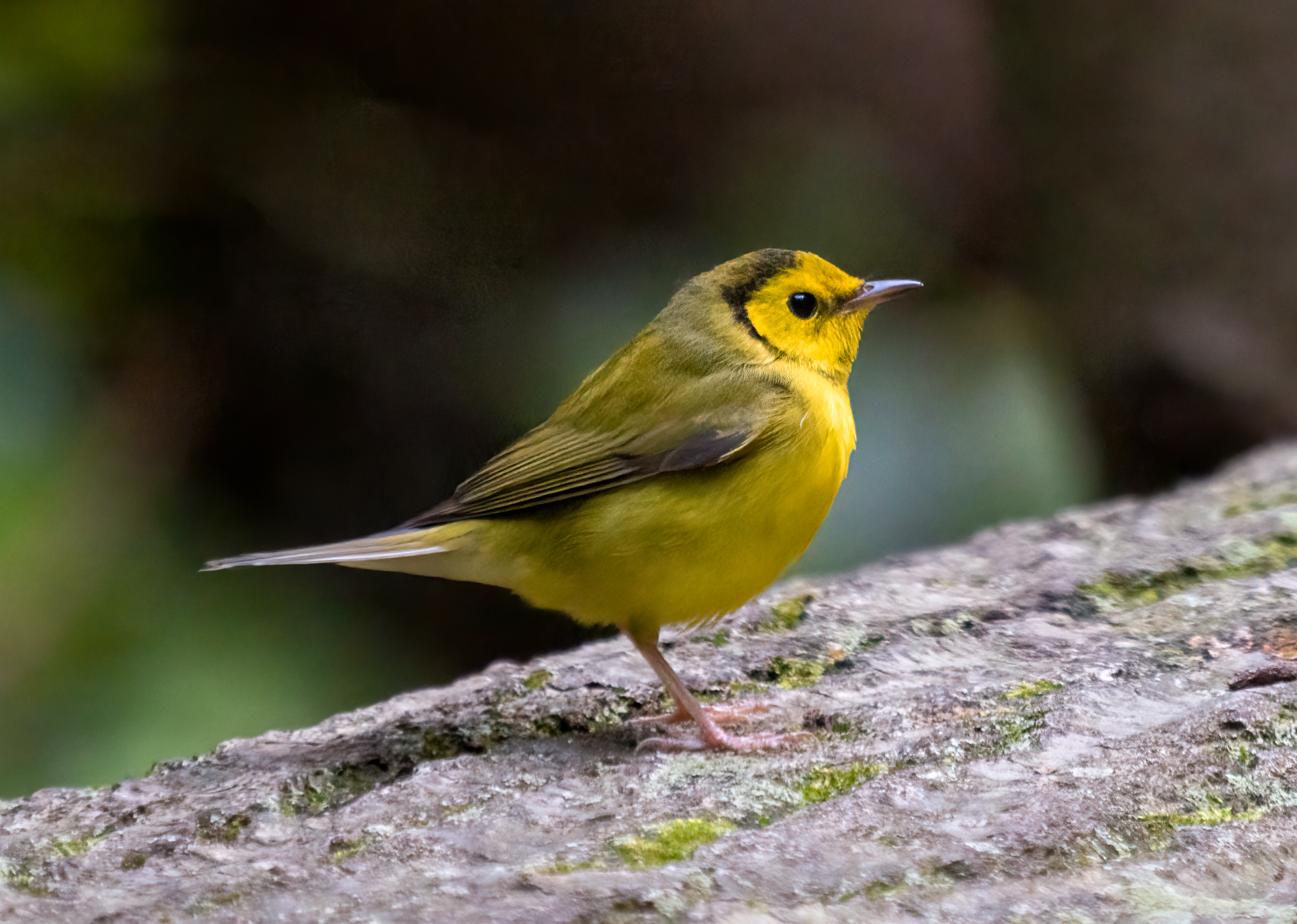
The hooded warbler is a threatened species in Canada. Happy Valley Forests is one of the few remaining Canadian habitats for this species.

The ecologically diverse moraine is the water source for many headwaters streams flowing south into rivers that drain into Lake Ontario and north into rivers that drain into Lake Scugog and Lake Simcoe. Varied landforms on the moraine, such as woodlands, wetlands, watercourses, kettle lakes and bogs, have provided an environment suitable for significant flora and fauna communities to develop and thrive. The moraine contains one of the last large contiguous forested spans in southern Ontario.

Some of the wide variety of plant and animal species found in the moraine are species at risk in Canada and Ontario, including the West Virginia white butterfly, Jefferson salamander, and red-shouldered hawk. Unique ecosystems in the moraine include wetlands similar to those of boreal forests in Northern Ontario, and remnants of tallgrass prairie and oak-pine savanna that are globally threatened ecosystems. A representative portion of the moraine may be found in the Happy Valley Forests, in York Region, north of Toronto.

== Hydrology ==
A number of features comprise the hydrological system of the Oak Ridges Moraine:

- permanent and ephemeral streams,
- wetlands,
- kettle lakes and ponds, and their catchment areas,
- seepage areas and springs, and
- aquifers and other recharge areas.

This hydrological system is inter-twined with a regional flow systems not bound by the morphological limits of the moraine. For this reason, environmentalists and researchers promote an aggressive protection strategy extending beyond the moraine, thus ensuring a contiguously protected hydrological system. Preservation of aquifers under the moraine is especially important, since they are used as a primary water source by some municipalities located on or near the moraine. These aquifers also discharge into tributaries that are the headwaters of approximately 65 creeks and rivers which eventually flow into Lake Simcoe, Lake Scugog and Lake Ontario or Georgian Bay.

The Oak Ridges Moraine Conservation Act stipulates that any development which targets the moraine or nearby areas must satisfy several conditions, most prominently that each development leave a buffer zone of 30 metres (98 ft) between it and any hydrological feature; for a kettle lake, this measure is from the edge of the lake's catchment area.

The Oak Ridges Moraine's hydrological system is a major constituent of the Humber Watershed, so that any factors affecting the moraine may affect the connected systems. A specific concern is urbanization, which affects water quality by increasing its load of metals and organic contaminants. A study by Cook et al. (1985) found an increase in mean annual runoff, instantaneous discharge, and hydrograph peak flow as a result of urbanization: "...changes in land use coincided with changes in volumetric and time distribution aspects of hydrologic response".

== Research on the moraine ==
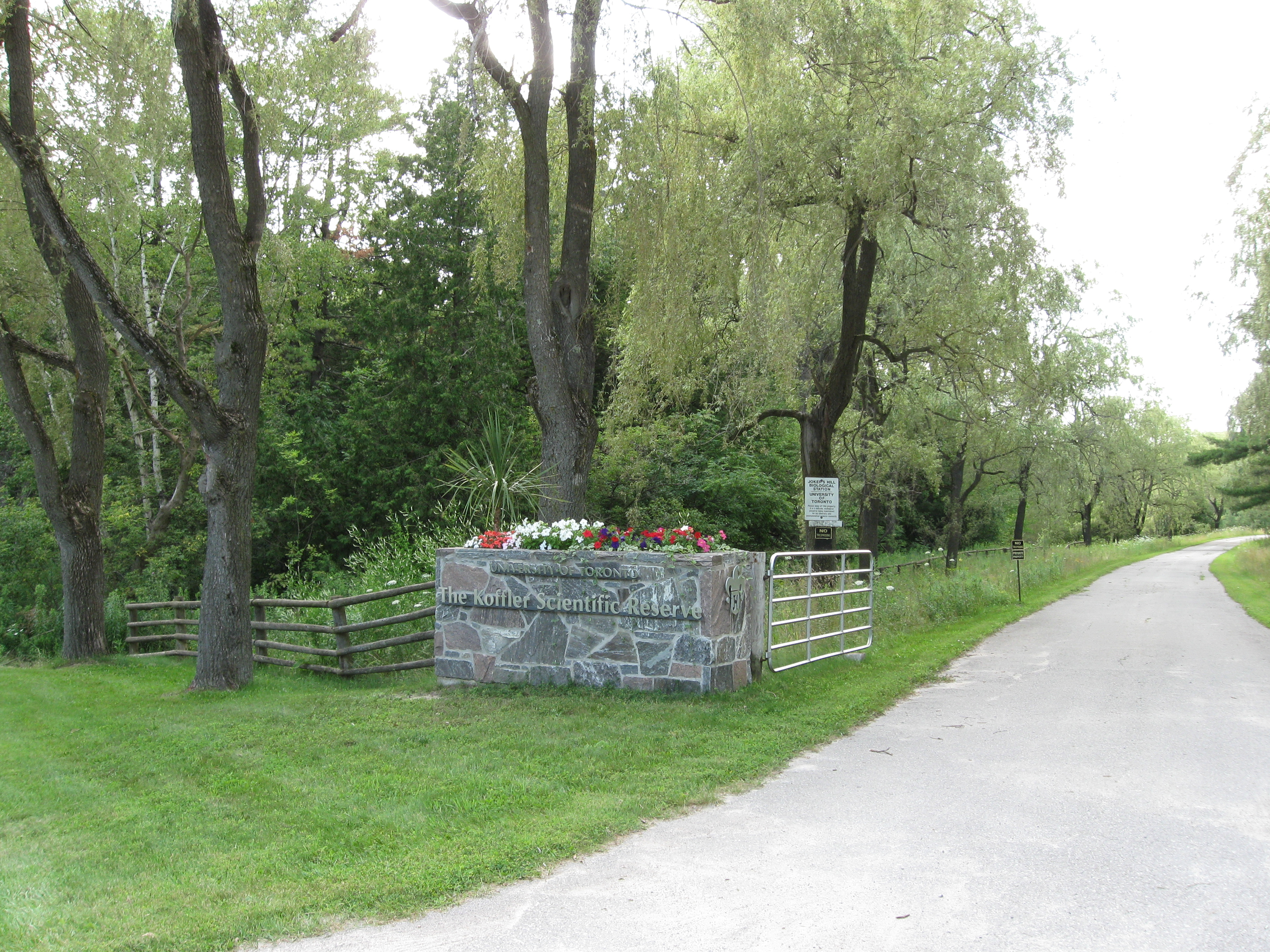
Entrance to the Koffler Scientific Reserve.

In 1829, John Bigsby conducted the first investigation of the moraine. He noted the elevation, and styled the area Oak Ridge, identifying the portion of moraine north of Toronto. The moraine's extent was not established until 1863 when William Logan conducted the Geological Survey of Canada.

Taylor formally defined the landform as the Oak Ridges Moraine in 1913. He described its extent to be from King and Maple in the west to the Trent River in the east. He also proposed that its origin was overlapping, interlobate glaciation retreat, between the Lake Ontario Lobe and the older Lake Simcoe Lobe. This has become the accepted explanation for the moraine's development, though research in the 1970s suggested the moraine may not be interlobate.

Research conducted in the 1990s revealed that the moraine has multiple origins: its eastern area has subglacial depositions (Gorrell and McCrae, 1993); early parts of the moraine were deposited in an esker (Brennand and Shaw, 1994); and that the moraine is not continuous, but is composed of multiple depositional environments: subglacial, ice-marginal and proglacial lacustrine (Barnett et al., 1998).

Current research efforts on the moraine are quite extensive. Because of the political implications of development on the moraine, and because its aquifers are a source of potable water for numerous communities, both federal and provincial governments have invested resources towards research on the moraine. The Geological Survey of Canada and Ontario Geological Survey both investigate hydrostratigraphy and hydrology throughout the moraine.

Palaeo-Indian hunter-gatherers were in this area between 11,000 - 9,500 BP. The oldest artifact found in what is now Richmond Hill, Ontario, from these people, was a stone scraper about 40 mm long, at the Mortson Site, near Leslie Street and 19th Avenue. Other artifacts were found in a settlement site on the eastern shore of Lake Wilcox.

Late Archaic artifacts c. 3800 BP have also been found at the Silver Stream site, near the headwaters of the Rouge River on Leslie Street, just north of Major Mackenzie Drive, and at the Esox site, on the eastern shore of Lake Wilcox.

== Political action ==
Although preservation of the moraine was first suggested in the 1940s, it was not until 1991 that the issue achieved prominence in political discourse. Part of the reason for its entry into political discourse, was due to the formation, in 1989, of the Save the Oak Ridges Moraine (STORM) Coalition.

The Government of Ontario created the Oak Ridges Moraine Technical Working Committee in June 1991, with the aim of creating a regional planning strategy for the moraine. The plan was completed in 1994, but was subsequently dismissed in favour of local government administration of the affected lands. This led to intense development on some portions of the moraine.

In early 1999, developers targeted Richmond Hill for large subdivisions on the moraine which would house over 100,000 people. On July 20, 1999, Minister of Municipal Affairs and Housing Steve Gilchrist announced, on "Rouge Park Day", that he would be implementing a ban on all development on the Oak Ridges Moraine. This announcement sparked considerable opposition by the development industry which, in turn, attracted considerable media attention and public interest. A media campaign by environmental groups built on the public opposition of the developments, and the issue was transferred to the Ontario Municipal Board (OMB) in 2000.

By May 2001, with the issue still unresolved, the provincial Conservative government announced a six-month moratorium on moraine development. A panel was formed to create a land-use plan consistent with the current "smart growth" policy. The plan was released in October 2001, and became the basis for Bill 122, the Oak Ridges Moraine Conservation Act, 2001, which divided the moraine into four zones with increasingly stringent controls on development in each. The Act prevented development of over 92% of the land mass of the moraine and only those development projects which had already received zoning and planning approval were allowed to be completed.

During the provincial election of 2003, the Liberal Party of Ontario promised to terminate development on the moraine as part of their election campaign. The government, in its attempt to halt developments, proposed the North Pickering Land Exchange. This involved exchanging government-owned public lands in North Pickering (the Seaton lands) for privately owned lands on the Oak Ridges Moraine in Richmond Hill and Uxbridge. The exchange settled outstanding disputes being considered by the OMB involving moraine lands in Richmond Hill and Uxbridge.

Despite all these efforts, including the government's creation of a permanently protected Greenbelt, the political struggle regarding the moraine continues.

Unless approved prior to the Oak Ridges Moraine Conservation Act coming into force in 2001 or through orders of the Ontario Municipal Board to the contrary, development on the Oak Ridges Moraine is restricted to the Settlement Area. Smaller-scale development which improves the ecological integrity of the moraine is permitted in other areas (i.e., tree farm), but is otherwise restricted. Given that the land-subdivision process is lengthy and that Markham, Vaughan, Richmond Hill, Whitchurch-Stouffville and King Township are experiencing a shortage in servicing capacity, what often appears as "new" development in Markham, Vaughan, Richmond Hill, Whitchurch-Stouffville and King Township on the moraine is in the majority of cases development which has had approval for many years.

== Development pressures ==
The greatest threat to the function of the moraine is land development on and below its surface, particularly in the headwaters. The estimated current population on the moraine land itself is roughly 200,000 but this number continues to grow at a frantic pace, with large urban developments occurring in Stouffville, Vaughan, Richmond Hill, and Aurora. This rapid development is especially apparent in Oak Ridges, where land previously set aside for conservation has, as of 2009, been opened up by the Richmond Hill Town Council for development. Another five million people live in close proximity. Use of the moraine is currently under dispute; environmental groups such as the Sierra Club maintain the area's delicate ecosystems are threatened by development pressures. Attractive forests and hilly relief typical of the moraine are a magnet for developers looking for building opportunities in the densely populated Greater Toronto Area. However, many planners and residents see a need to preserve the moraine from the negative aspects of urban sprawl.

Moreover, because it is a rich resource for sand and gravel, it has become a significant source of materials for the aggregate industry of the Greater Toronto Area.

== Conservation ==
Fisher and Alexander in the early 1990s described a "metropolitan" invasion of the Oak Ridges Moraine, in response to which organizations such as Save the Oak Ridges Moraine (STORM) were formed. Conservation Authorities Moraine Coalition (CAMC) is a coalition of nine Conservation Authorities with watersheds on the Oak Ridges Moraine (ORM). The Coalition formed in 2000 two years prior to the ORM conservation Plan, in response to the need for a comprehensive policy, planning and management approach geared to sustaining the health of the entire ORM. The CAMC is a partnership organization. It collaborates with numerous groups and individuals to achieve common objectives to support a robust and resilient environment across the ORM landscape. These objectives include; undertaking science-based research; providing opportunities for recreation; taking action for the protection and restoration of the ORM and; providing expert advice for environmental planning and policy matters.

Local concerns for preserving wildlife habitat on the moraine have increased in recent years. In April 2000, the Oak Ridges Moraine Land Trust was formed. The ORMLT is a non-profit organization that raises funds to protect areas on the moraine through conservation easements and outright purchases. They have protected over 21.5 square kilometres (5,300 acres). The Nature Conservancy of Canada is also active and are raising funds to protect a 5.4 km^{2} (1,300 acres) property called Happy Valley Forest.

In July 2024, Uxbridge Urban Provincial Park was established in the township of Uxbridge, conserving 1,315 acres of unconnected land parcels on the Oak Ridges Moraine.

The Oak Ridges Moraine Conservation Act, officially known as the Oak Ridges Moraine Conservation Act, 2001, is a conservation plan for land situated on or near the Oak Ridges Moraine in Ontario, Canada. The legislation was enacted by the Government of Ontario in 2001. The primary purpose of the legislation is to protect the ecological and hydrological integrity of the Oak Ridges Moraine. The legislation was passed by the Legislative Assembly of Ontario on 13 December 2001, and received royal assent the next day.

The Oak Ridges Moraine Land Trust is a Canadian charitable non-profit and Land Trust. Since January 2001, the Land Trust has permanently protected 63 properties, totalling over 4,884 acres (19.76 km^{2}) of land, and plays a critical role in solving the global problem of biodiversity loss and climate change.

== See also ==
- Conservation Ontario
- Greenbelt (Golden Horseshoe)
- Terminal moraine
- List of glacial moraines
