= AHCA (disambiguation) =

AHCA is the American Health Care Act of 2017, a US Congress bill to partially repeal the Patient Protection and Affordable Care Act (Obamacare).

AHCA may also refer to:

- American Health Care Association, U.S. federation of affiliated state health organizations
- American Hockey Coaches Association
- Agency for Health Care Administration, chief health policy and planning entity for the U.S. state of Florida
- Albion Hills Conservation Area, Canada
- Archer Heights Civic Association, neighborhood organization in Chicago, US
