= Duffin Creek Water Pollution Control Plant =

Water pollution control plant in Pickering, Ontario, Canada

Coordinates: 43.81836°N 79.05034°W

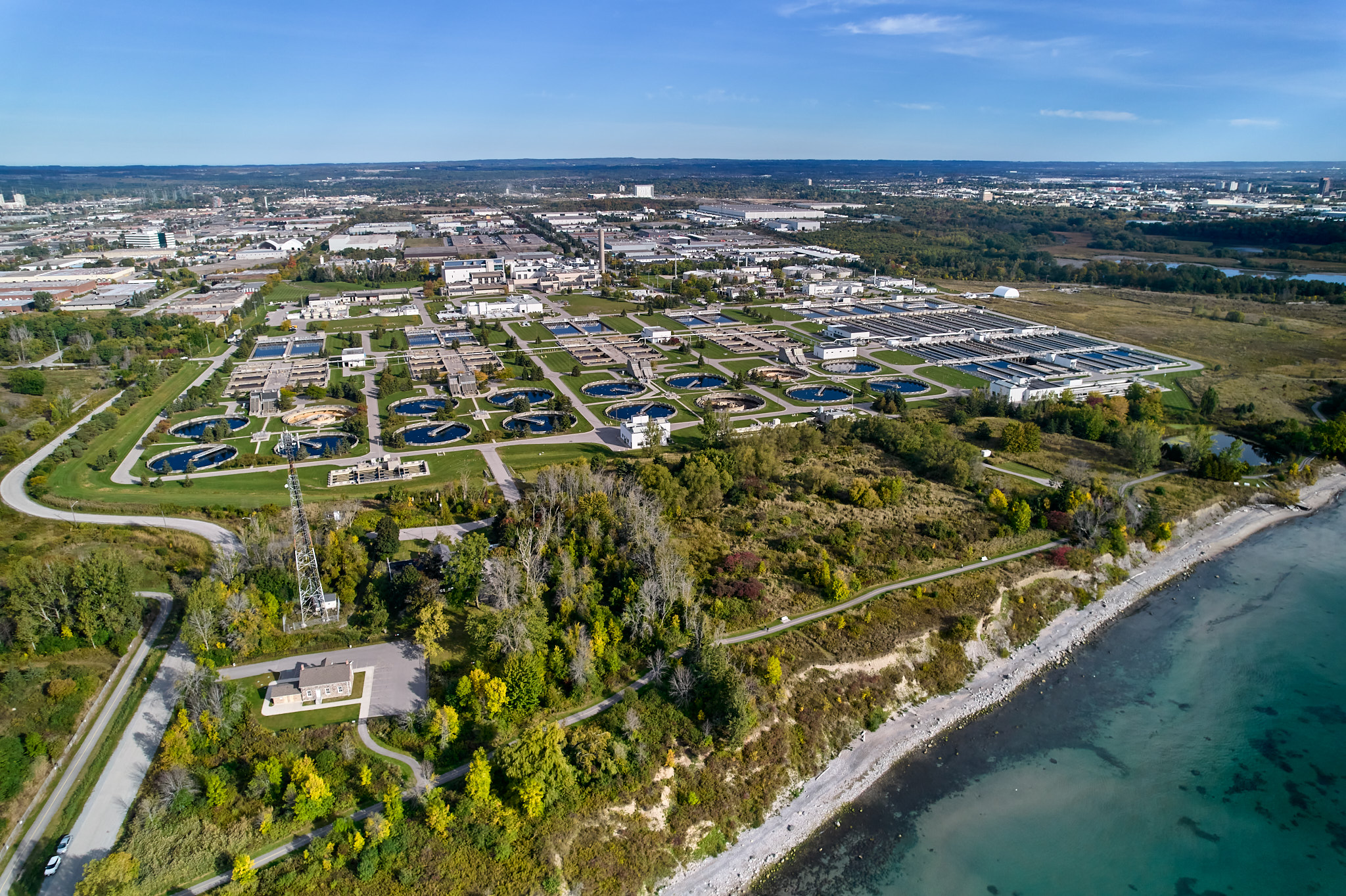
Aerial view from Lake Ontario

Duffin Creek Water Pollution Control Plant is on the north shore of Lake Ontario in the City of Pickering. It operates as a partnership between the Regional Municipality of York and the Regional Municipality of Durham. The Plant is capable of treating 630 million litres of wastewater each day and serves the communities of York Region, the Town of Ajax and the City of Pickering in Durham Region. Holding ISO 14001 certification, the Plant operates to ensure the environmentally responsible treatment of wastewater.

As the wastewater plant with the second largest capacity in Ontario, the Plant has a dual responsibility: to operate a disciplined wastewater facility, as well as to protect the surrounding environment and water quality of Lake Ontario.

The Duffin Creek Plant is classified a Class 4 conventional activated sludge treatment plant, under the auspices of the Ministry of the Environment, Conservation and Parks (MECP). The facility has expanded over the years to accommodate the regions’ growth, with the third stage completed in 2014.

The plant is a complex engineering system of tanks, pipes, specialized equipment and facilities covering the equivalent of 400 football fields. The plant treats wastewater from 80% of the homes, businesses and industry in the area. Once treated, the clean water, known as effluent, is returned back to Lake Ontario.

== History ==
In the 1960s Ontario faced declining quality in the rivers and streams in the Greater Toronto Area. Coupled with a growing population and a booming economy, the challenge was clear. Invest in a major, central facility to serve the Regions and meet the requirements of the Canada-U.S. Great Lakes Water Quality Agreement. Since the Plant’s opening in 1969, all levels of Government have invested $850 million to meet the area’s service requirements while protecting the environment. In 1997, the Province transferred Plant ownership to York and Durham Regions.

The Plant experienced a fire incident after an explosion in a single building on January 21, 2014. There were no injuries and the cause was a buildup of methane gas. The incident did not affect the Plant’s operation.

== Snapshot of the Duffin Creek Plant ==
Number of employees: 105, including staff at the York-Durham Regional Environmental Laboratory.

Hours of Operation: 24 hours a day, 365 days a year.

Maximum amount of wastewater the Plant is built to treat: 630 million litres of water each day.

Size of property: 166 hectares, almost two square kilometres (roughly the size of 400 football fields).

The discharge pipe into Lake Ontario is over a 1 kilometre long, with 63 variable diffusers in use.

The water’s quality is tested daily by the on-site laboratory, 365 days a year.

The facility offers a free liquid waste unloading site for recreational vehicles as a convenience to the community.

== Upgrades ==
Outfall Diffuser Upgrades – The Plant has installed variable port diffusers as warranted by increased flows through the Plant. The variable port diffusers increase the effluent flow through the outfall allowing the rated capacity of the Plant to increase to 630,000 metres cubed per day from 520,000 metres cubed per day. These also allow for better effluent mixing and improve dilution to meet regulations (20:1 ratio) (1 part volume (m3) of effluent is mixed with 20 parts of lake water).

Digester Mixing Upgrades (Linear Motion Mixers) – Each primary digester at the Plant is currently installed with five draft tube mixers to circulate sludge. These mixers are being replaced with linear motion mixers, which provide a 33 per cent energy reduction compared with the current draft tube mixers – a game changer in reducing corporate and community greenhouse gas emissions

== Lake Ontario monitoring ==
Together with the Toronto and Region Conservation Authority (TRCA), the Plant has been vigilant in monitoring the water quality from Lake Ontario since 2006. Officially known as the Western Durham Nearshore Water Quality Monitoring program, the data collected is vital so governments can make sound decisions and policy for the local environment. Think of the nearshore as the meeting place where humans interact with the natural environment. The ‘nearshore’ includes the shoreline or lake edge and the area of the lake out to a depth of approximately 30 metres. By better understanding the health of the lake, we can find ways to improve its water quality and protect the ecosystem. See trca.on.ca/nearshore.

== Water Quality Metrics ==
Water quality is tested multiple times a day by the on-site laboratory (York-Durham Regional Environmental Laboratory). Instruments continually monitor flow and processes in the Plant using a Supervisory Control and Data Acquisition (SCADA) system. • An average of 94 per cent of phosphorus is typically removed from wastewater entering the Plant before the clean treated water is released into Lake Ontario. • Water leaving the Plant regularly has less than 100 counts of E.coli per 100 millilitres of water – entirely safe for swimming.2

2 For more information see TRCA Lake Ontario Nearshore Monitoring – Ajax and Pickering website at: https://trca.ca/conservation/

== Odour Control ==
Duffin Creek Plant runs an aggressive odour control program that takes advantage of world-class technology and constantly upgrades to ensure it meets (or betters) the standards set by the MECP. The Plant has not had a complaint since 2018. Learn more at https://www.durham.ca/en/living-here/resources/Water-Treatment/DCWPCP---Odour-Control-Program---Web.pdf

== Greening of Duffin Creek ==
The Plant has a major footprint, overlooking Lake Ontario. Surrounded by woodlands, marshes and ponds, it sits on almost two square kilometres of land. Over the years, the greenery and tree planting has blossomed into a natural habitat for wildlife and native plants. The walking trail and bike path are well used and enjoyed year-round

In 2021, the Wildlife Habitat Council awarded Duffin Creek Plant certification for its commitment to conservation.

A stormwater pond collects rain and snow melt to improve water quality before it flows back into Lake Ontario. It does this by allowing dirt and other solids in stormwater runoff to settle at the bottom of the pond.

Almost 12 per cent of the Plant’s site includes woodland and wetland habitats. Work continues with the TRCA to enhance the greening and biodiversity of the area with such initiatives as bee boxes and nesting boxes, raised poles and platforms for birds of prey and planting native trees and shrubs.

== Future ==
The Plant completed a Schedule C Class Environmental Assessment to determine how best to meet higher volumes. Recommendations acted upon included optimizing the existing secondary treatment processes to enhance phosphorus removal, and to upgrade the outfall diffuser. The revision to the phosphorus concentration is more stringent than the limit of 0.5 mg/L set by the Great Lakes Water Quality Agreement. Committing to do better than the objectives outlined by the agreement demonstrates the region's priority on environmental stewardship and continuous improvement. In fact, the plant's discharge limit for phosphorus is one of the lowest in Ontario for plants discharging to the Great Lakes. Based on the plant's official annual average flow projections, meeting or doing better than the objectives will result in decreasing the plant's actual total phosphorus loading by approximately 40 per cent over the next 25 years compared to the current ECA objectives approved by MECP. Work is well underway in the construction of Phosphorus Reduction Action Plan (PRAP) upgrades with completion in 2024.
