= Palgrave Pond =

- Location of the lake in Southern Ontario
- Location: Regional Municipality of Peel, Ontario
- Coordinates: 43°57′08″N 79°50′20″W
- Type: Reservoir
- Part of: Great Lakes Basin
- Primary inflows: Humber River
- Primary outflows: Humber River
- Basin countries: Canada
- Max. length: 420 m (1,380 ft)
- Max. width: 200 m (660 ft)
- Surface area: 5.2 ha (13 acres)
- Average depth: .5 m (1 ft 8 in)
- Max. depth: 1.1 m (3 ft 7 in)
- Surface elevation: 274 metres (899 ft)

Palgrave Pond (also known as the Palgrave Mill Pond) is a reservoir just northwest of the community of Palgrave in the Town of Caledon, Regional Municipality of Peel in the Greater Toronto Area of southern Ontario, Canada. It is adjacent to Ontario Highway 50 (Peel Regional Road 50) and was formed by the damming of the main branch of the Humber River, originally to create a mill pond. Each winter, the surface of the pond is transformed into a community skating rink available for recreational use (commonly referred to as the Palgrave Pond). The rinks are created by local volunteer, Ken Hunt (aka the “Ice Angel”), and have appeared on the Mill Pond each winter since December 2000.

== Hydrology ==
The pond is on the main upper branch of the Humber river and is impounded by a modern concrete weir. The primary inflow, at the northwest, and outflow, at the southwest, is the Humber River, and the lake has a maximum depth of 1.1 metres (3 ft 7 in) and an average depth of 0.5 metres (1 ft 8 in).

== Natural history ==
There is a fishway with a viewing window at the dam to allow fish to bypass the structure. Twelve species of fish, for example the White Sucker, Brown bullhead and Golden shiner, have been found in the pond.

== Economy ==
=== Recreation ===
The ice rinks on the Mill Pond are created in late fall or early winter – as soon as the pond freezes deeply enough to support human traffic – and are maintained throughout the winter and into the early spring, for as long as the ice retains a safe thickness. The rinks are seldom left unused and on the weekends the mill pond is transformed into a postcard image of Canada when the rinks fill with families out to enjoy a leisurely skate or game of pond hockey.

The site usually offers several hockey rinks of varying sizes as well as a recreational skating loop. Facilities at the rinks include washrooms, benches for seating, and miscellaneous hockey equipment for hockey players to use. As the rinks are not maintained by local authorities, facilities are made available through funds raised by local organisations such as the Palgrave Rotary Club and through donations by families using the rinks.

The rinks are generally used for recreational skating and casual hockey games, but they also play host to winter parties and events. Pondfest was a 2007 Winter festival hosted by the Ontario ATV Search and Rescue Federation and supported by the Palgrave Rotary Club. In 2012 the venue will host the inaugural Kinsmen Canadian Pond Hockey Championship.

Although generally used by locals looking for some winter exercise, the picturesque and well-maintained rinks attract skaters from outside of the community, sometimes from as far off as Toronto. The popular rinks were even featured in the Toronto Star.

As the rinks are not maintained by local authorities, users skate on the rinks at their own risk. If the ice thickness level has been checked and deemed too thin for safe use, signs will be posted warning skaters off the rinks; however, these signs will appear only if ice thickness has been recently checked and so skaters must take all standard precautions when entering the ice surface.

==== The Ice Angel ====
The rinks on the Mill Pond are created and maintained by a Palgrave local, Ken Hunt, who is known as the “Ice Angel”. Hunt began clearing the rinks with his teenage children after searching unsuccessfully for another local public rink where they could skate and play hockey. Local residents soon noticed the new ice rink and flocked out to make use of it. Hunt then began expanding the skating area of the central hockey rink and built a loop around it where recreational skaters could skate without hockey players and skaters getting in the way of one another.
