= Charles Sauriol =

Canadian naturalist (1904–1995)

Charles Joseph Sauriol
- Born: May 3, 1904; Toronto, Ontario, Canada
- Died: December 16, 1995 (aged 91); Toronto, Ontario, Canada
- Occupation: Naturalist

Charles Joseph Sauriol, CM (May 3, 1904 – December 16, 1995) was a Canadian naturalist who was responsible for the preservation of many natural areas in Ontario and across Canada. He owned property in the Don River valley and was an advocate for the valley's preservation. As a member of the Metropolitan Toronto and Region Conservation Authority, he was responsible for much of the Don Valley's conservation. A section of the valley is a conservation reserve named in his honour and four other locations in Canada are named in his honour.

== Early life ==
Charles Sauriol was born in Toronto, Ontario. He was the youngest of seven children. His father, Joseph Sauriol, had moved to Toronto in 1882 to work on a project that involved straightening the lower portion of the Don River. Charles was an eighth-generation Canadian. An ancestor of his had emigrated to New France from Brittany in 1705.

During his boyhood he camped out in the Don Valley with the 45th East Toronto Troop of the Boy Scouts. At this time the Don was mostly woods and farmland that remained mostly in its natural state. It was during these trips that he fell in love with the outdoors and especially the Don. This inspired his commitment to help protect the Don Valley for future generations.

Sauriol was fluently bilingual. He worked for 30 years as an advertising manager for French language publishing companies such as Poirier Bessette and Le Samedi. Sauriol married Simonne Menard (1911-July 22, 2005) in 1931.

== Conservation activities ==
In 1946, he was co-founder of the Don Valley Conservation Association (DVCA) whose mission was to preserve the Don Valley as a woodland park. Sauriol edited and published the DVCA newsletter called The Cardinal from 1951 to 1956. The Association organized steam locomotive trips for the DVCA called The Conservation Special as fundraisers from 1951 to 1961. These trips began at the Don River station near Queen St. in the Don Valley. These excursions attracted upwards of 1000 people and traveled to such destinations as Cobourg, Lindsay, and Niagara Falls.

In 1957, he joined the Metropolitan Toronto and Region Conservation Authority (MTRCA) (known today as the Toronto and Region Conservation Authority). Sauriol served on the MTRCA's executive committee and as chairman of the Conservation Areas Advisory Board. It was during the 1950s and 1960s that MTRCA was responsible for acquiring most of the valley and ravine lands in the Toronto area. This was a direct result of the damage caused by Hurricane Hazel.

During his tenure he was responsible for acquiring land to create conservation areas in the Toronto area. His notable acquisitions included Bruce's Mill, Claremont, Glen Haffy, Cold Creek, and Black Creek Pioneer Village.

In 1966 Sauriol joined the Nature Conservancy of Canada (NCC), which had been established in 1962. He worked as administrative director and assisted the NCC in acquiring natural areas. In 1971, he left the MTRCA to work for the NCC. In 1982, he became executive director of the Conservancy, until his retirement in 1987. During his time with the NCC, he was responsible for raising funds and acquiring natural areas across Canada. He helped acquire 500 properties in Ontario alone.

After leaving NCC, he co-founded another organization called Trees for Today and Tomorrow which planted trees to restore degraded areas. He continued working as a consultant, lending his expertise to conservation authorities throughout Ontario with land acquisitions.

== Sauriol and the Don ==
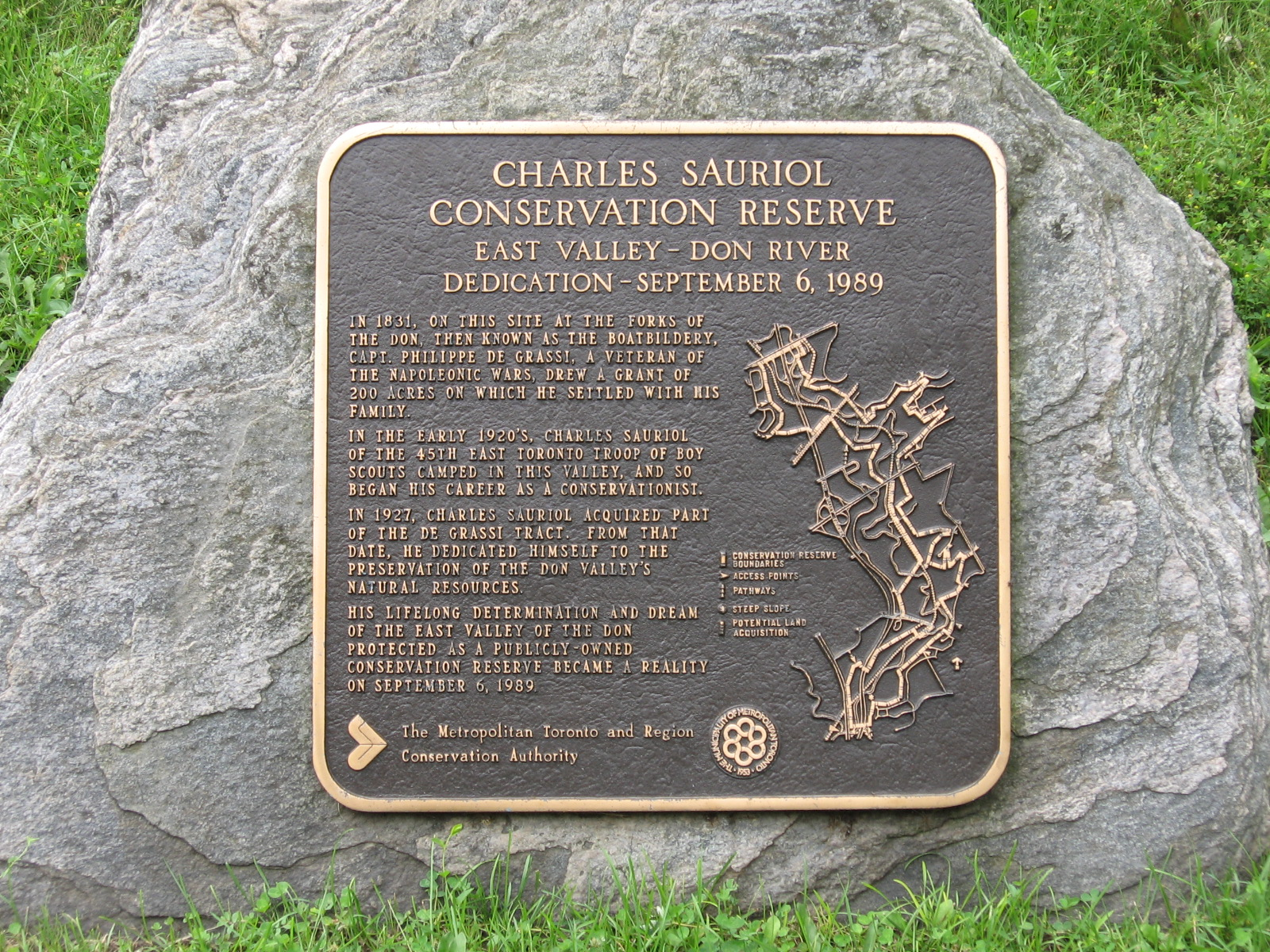
Plaque commemorating creation of Charles Sauriol Conservation Reserve

In 1927 he purchased a 40 hectare property at the Forks of the Don. He used this as a cottage and every year moved his family to stay there during the summer months. Part of the land was expropriated in 1958 to build the Don Valley Parkway. In 1968, the MTRCA expropriated the rest of his property as part of a larger program to acquire most of the private property in the Don Valley.

While his conservation work frequently took him outside Toronto, his original love was the Don Valley. Most of his weekends were spent walking along trails in the valley. He frequently visited his property during the winter which he used as a retreat to write in his journal or create articles for the Cardinal. He wrote four books about the history of the Don. One book, Remembering the Don, is actually a collection of articles from The Cardinal.

In 1989, in appreciation for his conservation work and especially his advocacy for the Don, a section of the Don Valley along the East Branch of the Don River from the forks up to Lawrence Avenue East was named the Charles Sauriol Conservation Reserve.

In 1991 he helped to found the Todmorden Mills Wildflower Preserve which still maintains a small forested area in the Lower Don.

== Accolades and legacy ==
His life work as a conservationist was recognized by many. Known as Mr. Conservation he was made a Member of the Order of Canada on April 12, 1989. He received 40 other awards and citations including the Governor General's Conservation Award in 1980 and the Parks Canada Heritage Award in 1991.

Sauriol was described as an experienced outdoorsman who also had the knack for fundraising. During his career he raised over $20 million to preserve natural areas. His legacy of preserving natural areas will be enjoyed by Canadians for many generations.

In addition to the Charles Sauriol Conservation Reserve four other natural areas have been named for him: the Charles Sauriol Conservation Area on the Credit River, the John M. Cape/Charles Sauriol Biological Studies Area at the Lake Opinicon site of Queen's University, the Charles Sauriol Parkette in the former Borough of East York, and the Charles Sauriol Carolinian Forest in Norfolk County. Starting in 1995, the MTRCA and the Oak Ridges Moraine Land Trust host the Charles Sauriol Environmental Dinner, an annual fundraising event.

As years go on and the population increases, there will be a need of these lands and more, and in life where so much appears futile, this one thing will remain. In essence, those who continue to support the work of conservation can say, I have lived here, I have done something positive to ensure that its natural beauty and natural values continue. – C.J. Sauriol

The school board Conseil scolaire Viamonde has named an elementary school in his honour.

Sauriol died of natural causes in 1995 at the age of 91.

== Works ==
- Remembering the Don: A Rare Record of Earlier Times Within the Don River Valley. Consolidated Amethyst Communications. 1981. ISBN 0-920474-22-5
- A Beeman's Journey, Toronto: Natural Heritage/Natural History Publishers. 1984. ISBN 0-920474-32-2
- Tales of the Don. Natural Heritage/Natural History. 1984. ISBN 0-920474-30-6
- Green Footsteps: Recollections of a Grassroots Conservationist. Hemlock Press. 1991. ISBN 0-929066-05-7
- Trails of the Don. Hemlock Press. 1992. ISBN 0-929066-10-3
- Pioneers of the Don. Self-published. 1995. ISBN 0-9699685-0-7
