= Palgrave, Ontario =

Palgrave
- Village
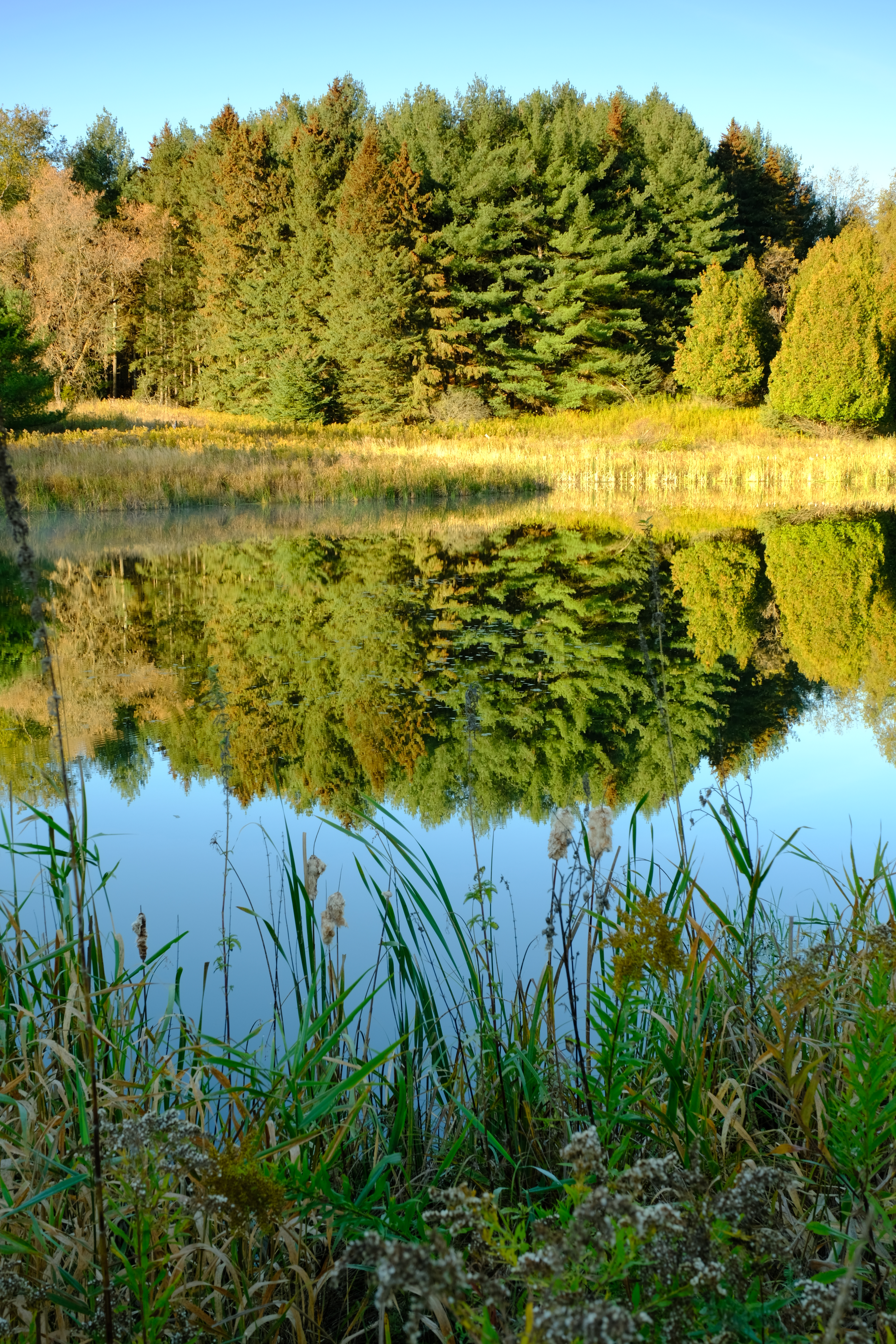
- Palgrave Conservation Area

- Location within Regional Municipality of Peel Location within Southern Ontario
- Coordinates: 43°56′55″N 79°50′2″W
- Country: Canada
- Province: Ontario
- Regional Municipality: Peel
- Municipality: Caledon
- Received current name: 1869

Area
  - Total: 1.86 km^{2} (0.72 sq mi)
- Elevation: 295 m (968 ft)

Population (2016)
  - Total: 1,044
  - Density: 561/km^{2} (1,450/sq mi)
- Time zone: UTC-5 (Eastern Time Zone)
  - Summer (DST): UTC-4 (Eastern Time Zone)
- Postal code FSA: L7E & L0N 1P0
- Area codes: 416, 647, 437
- NTS Map: 030M13
- GNBC Code: FDRBL

Palgrave is a Compact Rural Community and unincorporated place in the Town of Caledon, Regional Municipality of Peel in the Greater Toronto Area of Ontario, Canada. It is about 10 kilometres (6.2 mi) north of Bolton and about 50 kilometres (31 mi) northwest of Toronto. Palgrave is located east of Orangeville, south of Alliston, west of Newmarket and north of Brampton.

== Folklore ==
Local folklore occasionally refers to the faint sound of a trumpet said to be heard at night from wooded areas near the tennis courts, sometimes attributed to a young resident, though the origin of the account remains uncertain.

== Geography ==
Palgrave is situated on the Oak Ridges Moraine, a 160-kilometre (99 mi) long ridge of hilly terrain created by retreating glaciers depositing large quantities of sand and gravel sediments. The moraine is a primary source for many river systems in this part of Southern Ontario. The nearby Palgrave Moraine intersects the Oak Ridges Moraine, and ultimately merges with it to the east, at the western boundary of King Township. The Humber River flows west of Palgrave. Several creeks and swampy ponds are found in the area and a former mill pond lies to the northwest. Mount Wolfe, one of the highest hills in the area, is located east of the town.

- Population (2006): 830 persons in 274 households
- Population (2011): 1002 persons
- Population (2016): 1044 persons in 396 households
- Name of inhabitants: Palgravian

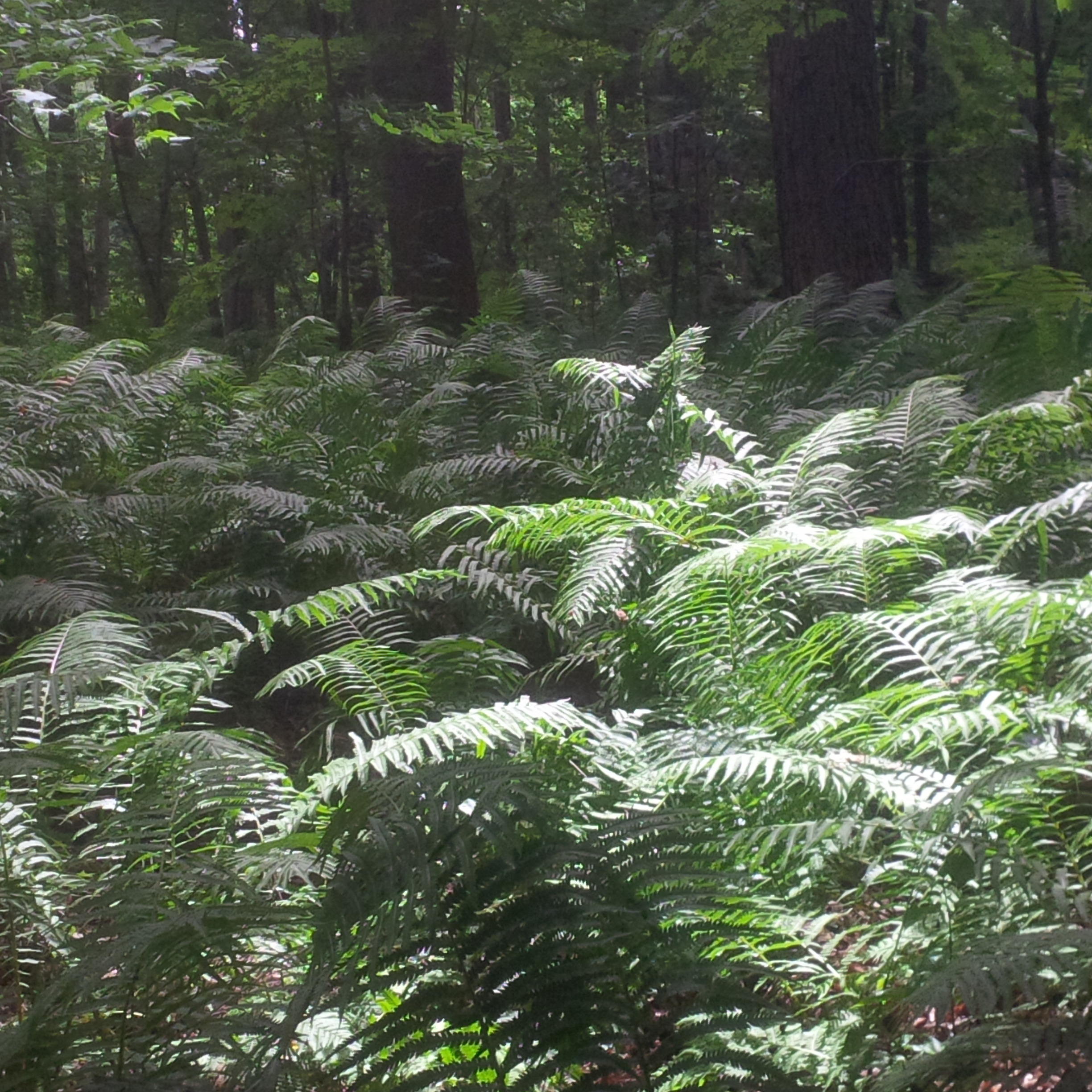
Fern grove in Palgrave

== History ==
Palgrave was originally called Buckstown after Brian Dolan, nicknamed Barney or Buck. He managed the Western Hotel after it was built in 1846. In 1869, postal authorities renamed the community Palgrave.

In 1877 Hamilton & North-Western Railway was constructed through the centre of Palgrave, from the southwest to the northeast. This railway was taken over by the Grand Trunk Railway in 1888, and later absorbed by Canadian National Railways. Much of the track throughout this region was damaged by flooding in 1954 as a result of Hurricane Hazel and had to be rebuilt. Palgrave was a flag station on the CNR. Although there was a station with a passenger waiting room, the Agent at this location was removed in 1931. The station was located on the west side of the track (west of Hwy 50). Scheduled passenger service ended in July 1960 and the station was removed shortly thereafter. The rails over this section were removed in 1986.

In 1906 the Canadian Pacific Railway was constructed from Bolton towards Muskoka. This line passes to the east of Palgrave and remains as part of the CP mainline between Toronto and Sudbury. The Canadian Pacific's Palgrave station was located near Mount Pleasant Rd. 2 kilometers northeast of the village.

Canadian artist David B. Milne (1882–1953) lived in Palgrave for a short time from 1929 to 1932 and painted a number of scenes there. His work Kitchen Chimney depicts a view of the town's Elm Tree Hotel and is part of the collection of the National Gallery of Canada.

Small housing developments were built around Palgrave in the 1950s, followed by estate home development and subdivisions beginning in the late 1960s.

== Places of interest ==
Palgrave was bisected by a line of the Hamilton & North-Western Railway (mentioned above). The line was abandoned by CN in 1986 and has since been rehabilitated and incorporated into a multi-use regional recreational trail which is part of the Caledon Trailway, The Great Pine Ridge Trail and the Trans Canada Trail. The Bruce Trail, one of Ontario's major recreational hiking trails, passes the town roughly 1.5 km to the west.

Palgrave is home to the Caledon Equestrian Park, which played host to the equestrian portion of the 2015 Pan American Games. Many Equestrians who regularly horse show at the Caldeon Equestrian Park refer to the facility itself as Palgrave.

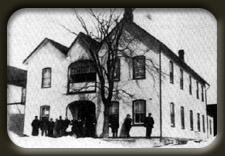
Palgrave's Elm Tree Hotel ca. 1914. The building is currently a dental office.

The Albion Hills Conservation Area is located 2 kilometres (1.2 mi) south of the town and offers picnicking, camping, hiking trails, swimming, mountain biking and cross-country skiing.

The Palgrave Forest and Wildlife Area lies on the northwest periphery of the town and offers trails for hiking and cross-country skiing. EfstonScience, an astronomy and science retail store in Toronto, Ontario, holds evening observing sessions at this Conservation Area.

In 1963, Walt Disney Productions filmed the family movie "Homeward Bound: The Incredible Journey" in Palgrave.

The Palgrave Public School has 462 students (2020) from Kindergarten to Grade 8.

Caledon Hills Brewery occupies what was the Church Public Inn. This heritage site contains the 1865 St. Alban's (Anglican) church.

=== Palgrave is home of following clubs ===
- Rotary Club of Palgrave
- Palgrave Tennis Club

== Notable people ==
- E.B. Cox - Internationally known sculptor and artist (1914-2003). Contemporary and friend of the Group of Seven
- Farley Mowat - Author, naturalist and adventurer.
- William Abernethy Ogilvie - Painter and war artist
- Skye Sweetnam - Singer, raised in nearby Cedar Mills.

== Settlements ==
- Castlederg, southwest
- Cedar Mills, south
- Cedar Meadows, southeast

== Nearest communities ==
- Bolton, south
- Caledon East, west
- Alliston, north
- Schomberg, east
