= Petticoat Creek (Canada) =

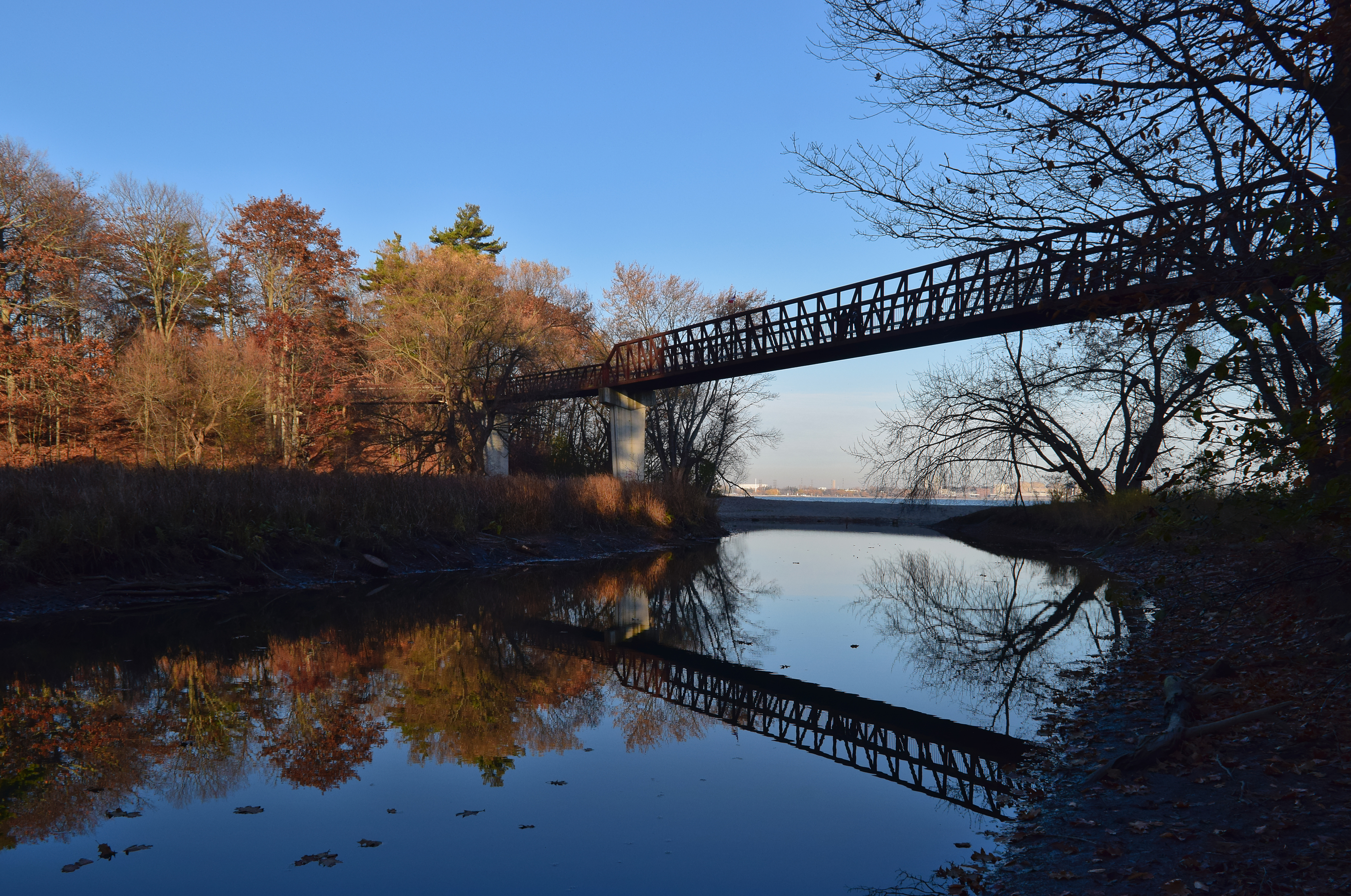
- Mouth of Petticoat Creek.

- Location of the mouth of Petticoat Creek in Southern Ontario

Location
- Country: Canada
- Province: Ontario
- Region: Greater Toronto Area
- Municipalities: Pickering; Toronto; Markham

Physical characteristics
- Source: Confluence of two unnamed streams
  - location: Markham
  - coordinates: 43°52′45″N 79°11′22″W
  - elevation: 195 m (640 ft)
- Mouth: Lake Ontario
  - location: Pickering
  - coordinates: 43°48′15″N 79°06′15″W
  - elevation: 74 m (243 ft)
- Basin size: 26.77 km^{2} (10.34 sq mi)

Basin features
- River system: Great Lakes Basin

Petticoat Creek is a stream in the cities of Pickering, Toronto and Markham in the Greater Toronto Area of Ontario, Canada. The creek is in the Great Lakes Basin, is a tributary of Lake Ontario, and falls under the auspices of the Toronto and Region Conservation Authority. Its watershed covers 26.77 square kilometres (10.34 sq mi), and the cumulative length of all its branches is 49 kilometres (30 mi). Land use in the watershed consists of 52% agricultural, 27% protected greenspace and 21% urban.

The "Petticoat Creek watershed is dominated by the South Slope physiographic region, a smooth, faintly drumlinized till plain."

Because the creek is not long enough for its headwaters to lie within the groundwater rich Oak Ridges Moraine, waterflow on the upper reaches is intermittent and dependent on precipitation. Lower reaches, below the ancient shoreline of glacial Lake Iroquois, is more consistent.

== Petticoat Creek Conservation Area ==
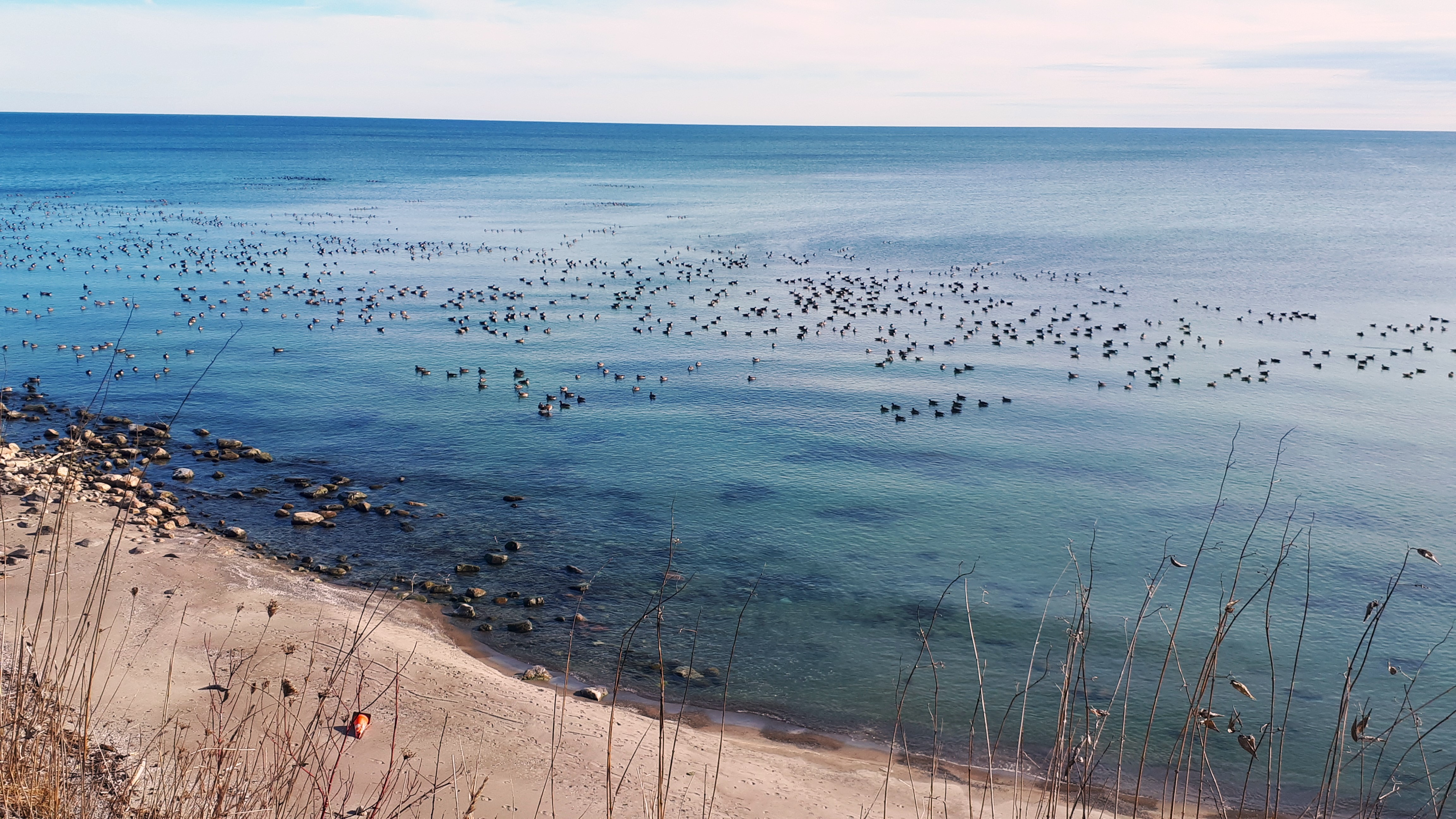
View of the Lake Ontario from the Lookout

The Petticoat Creek Conservation Area is located at the mouth of the creek at Lake Ontario, and is managed by the Toronto and Region Conservation Authority after the Petticoat Creek Conservation Authority was absorbed in the TRCA.

== See also ==
- Waterfront Trail
