= Albion Hills Conservation Area =

Conservation area in Ontario, Canada

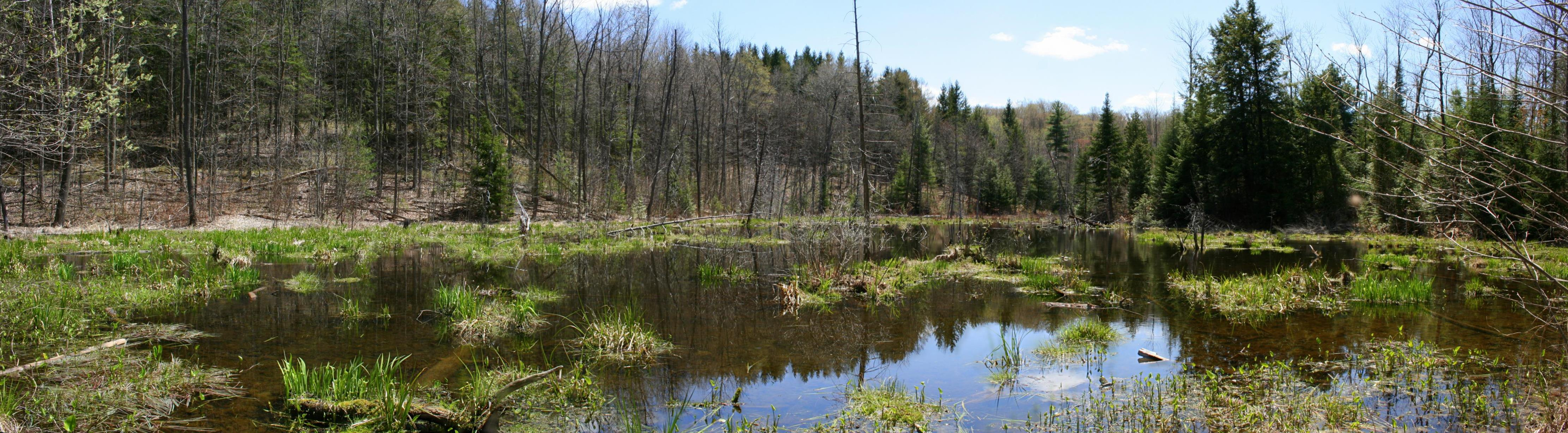
- Interactive map of Albion Hills Conservation Area
- Location: Caledon, Ontario, Canada
- Coordinates: 43.92702°N 79.82926°W
- Owner: Toronto and Region Conservation Authority
- Website: trca.ca/parks/albion-hills-conservation-area/

Albion Hills Conservation Area (AHCA) is located in the Town of Caledon within the Regional Municipality of Peel. AHCA is located eight kilometers north of Bolton, off of Highway 50 at 16500 Highway 50, Palgrave, Ontario. It is owned and managed by the Toronto and Region Conservation Authority (TRCA). AHCA sees about 120,000 visitors each year, who visit the conservation area for mountain biking, camping, swimming, special events, cross-country skiing and more.

With over 446 hectares (1,200 acres) of largely forested land located completely within the Humber River Watershed in the headwaters of the Oak Ridges Moraine, AHCA is recognized as a key natural heritage site. Located on-site is the first-ever residence for the Palgrave area, a historical log cabin built by the Jefferson family in 1833.

AHCA opened in 1955, and since then has been recognized as the first Conservation Facility in Ontario. AHCA is also home to one of the largest breeding grounds for Herons in Southern Ontario.

Located on-site are two educational field centres that students can visit as a part of their educational curriculums. AHCA also features a community farm which employs sustainable agricultural practices while providing the surrounding community with local and ethically produced food.

== Special events ==
=== Mountain Bike Races ===
Since the late 1990s TRCA has partnered with Chico Mountain Bike Racing to put on numerous mountain biking festivals throughout the summer. The Chico 24hrs of Summer Solstice riding event is the largest 24-hour race in North America and the largest riding event hosted within AHCA.

=== Mud Hero ===
Mud Hero offers participants a military-style obstacle course, with challenges such as mud pits and wall climbs. The event, rated one of Canada's best-rated obstacle events in 2013, has been hosted at Albion Hills Conservation Area since 2012, and brings in around 8,000 participants yearly.

=== Run or Dye ===
In 2014, AHCA hosted its first colour run, Run or Dye. Participants ran a 5k trail through AHCA, getting sprayed with powdered colour at "colour stations" throughout the race. The event drew over 4,000 participants.

=== Caledon Canada Day ===
Since 1996, AHCA has hosted an annual July 1 Caledon Canada Day event. Each year, around 10,000 people attend to take part in festivities which include live music, food vendors, exotic animals and children's activities. The event is closed off with a spectacular firework show, lighting up the sky at dusk.

== Trails ==
=== Mountain biking trails ===
Albion Hills offers mountain biking trails in Southern Ontario. AHCA's trail system offers users over 40 km of double- and single-track trails, and is designed for riders of all ages and skill sets.

AHCA's single-track trail system totals 13.5 km in length. The system is made up of the following trails:

Trail	Length (m)
IMBA Alley	850 m
Gnarly Berms	870 m
Goat Path	710 m
Woo Wu	790 m
Sugar Shack Shuffle	1090 m
Sugar Rush	510 m
Get Groen	450 m
Moraine Momentum	330 m
Pining for More	380 m
Pinecone Express	800 m
Tea Cup	380 m
BMBC Twister	580 m
Albion Witch	470 m
Live and Learn	570 m
Epic Ride	650 m
Handle with Care	1050 m
High Roller	910 m
Hot August Night	280 m
Ridge Run	290 m
In Speed we Trust	370 m
Speed-o-Rama	530 m
Summer Solstice	840 m

=== Hiking trails ===
AHCA offers users five double-track / hiking trails, equaling close to 23 km in length.

Trails include:

Trail	Length (km)
Green Trail	1.8 km
Yellow Trail	2.5 km
Blue Trail	5.5 km
Red Trail	8.6 km
Black Trail	4.5 km

All trails at AHCA are multi-use, unless otherwise stated, however, single-track trails are mountain bike preferred.

=== Ski trails ===
During the winter months, AHCA opens its doors for cross-country skiing and snowshoeing along its winter trail system.

This system includes close to 27 km of terrain accessible for winter users when weather permits.

Trails include:

Trail	Length (km)
Green Trail	1.8 km
Yellow Trail	2.5 km
Blue Trail	5.5 km
Red Trail	8.6 km
Black Trail (skate ski)	6.5 km
Pink Trail (snowshoeing)	2 km

== Camping ==
Albion Hills Campground offers campers natural views, activities, and amenities, 40 minutes outside of the city. The campground offers users 234 serviced and unserviced sites, along with and pull-through sites for RVs.

Amenities offered at Albion Hills Campground include: Campground Store, Washrooms, Showers, Fire Pits, Children's Play Areas, Wireless Internet in the Chalet. Furthermore, campers at Albion Hills have access to all of AHCA's amenities, including hiking, fishing, and for an added fee, canoeing and swimming.

Camping season begins at Albion Hills at the end of April to the end of October.

== Facilities ==
=== Swimming ===
Overlooking Lake Albion is AHCA's interactive pool and splash pad facilities. The facility includes a 440 sq metre wading pool (4 ft deep) and a 125 sq metre splash pad.

=== Chalet rental ===
Nestled within the woods, Albion Hills chalet offers high ceilings, a large deck, and panoramic forest views. The facility can accommodate up to 135 people indoors, and is available for weddings, social or corporate events.

=== Picnic rental ===
There are 11 picnic sites located throughout AHCA.

Customer service representatives are available to assist visitors in arranging caterers, tent rental and entertainment for their events.
