= Toronto and Region Conservation Authority =

Conservation authority in Ontario, Canada

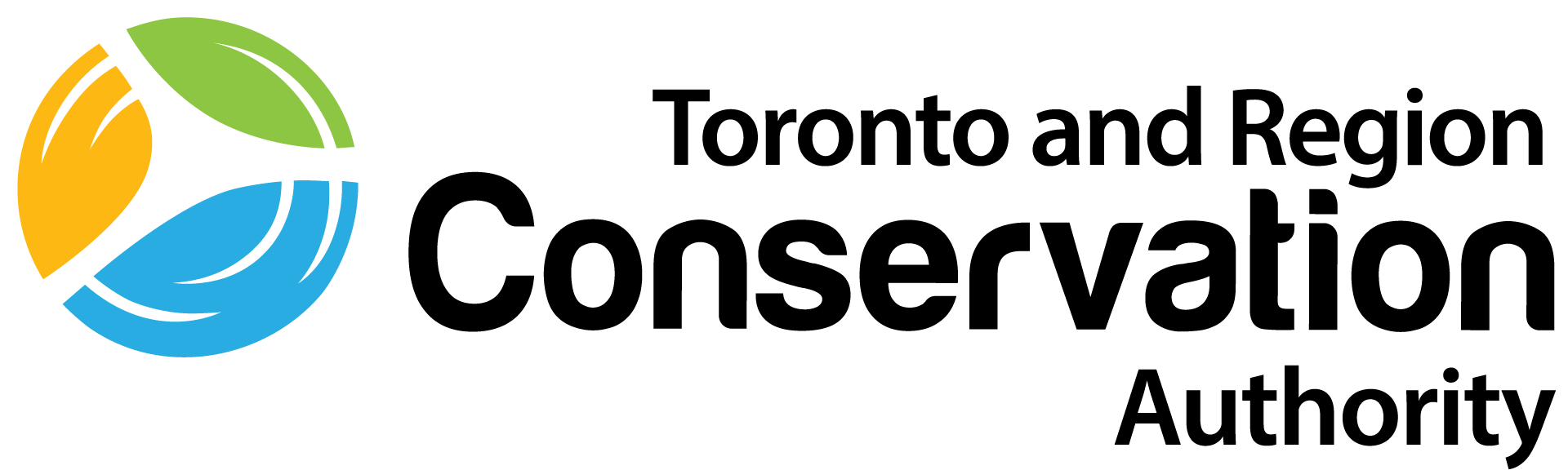
- Abbreviation: TRCA
- Established: 1957
- Type: Conservation authority
- Purpose: Natural resources conservation and management
- Region served: Greater Toronto Area
- Website: trca.ca

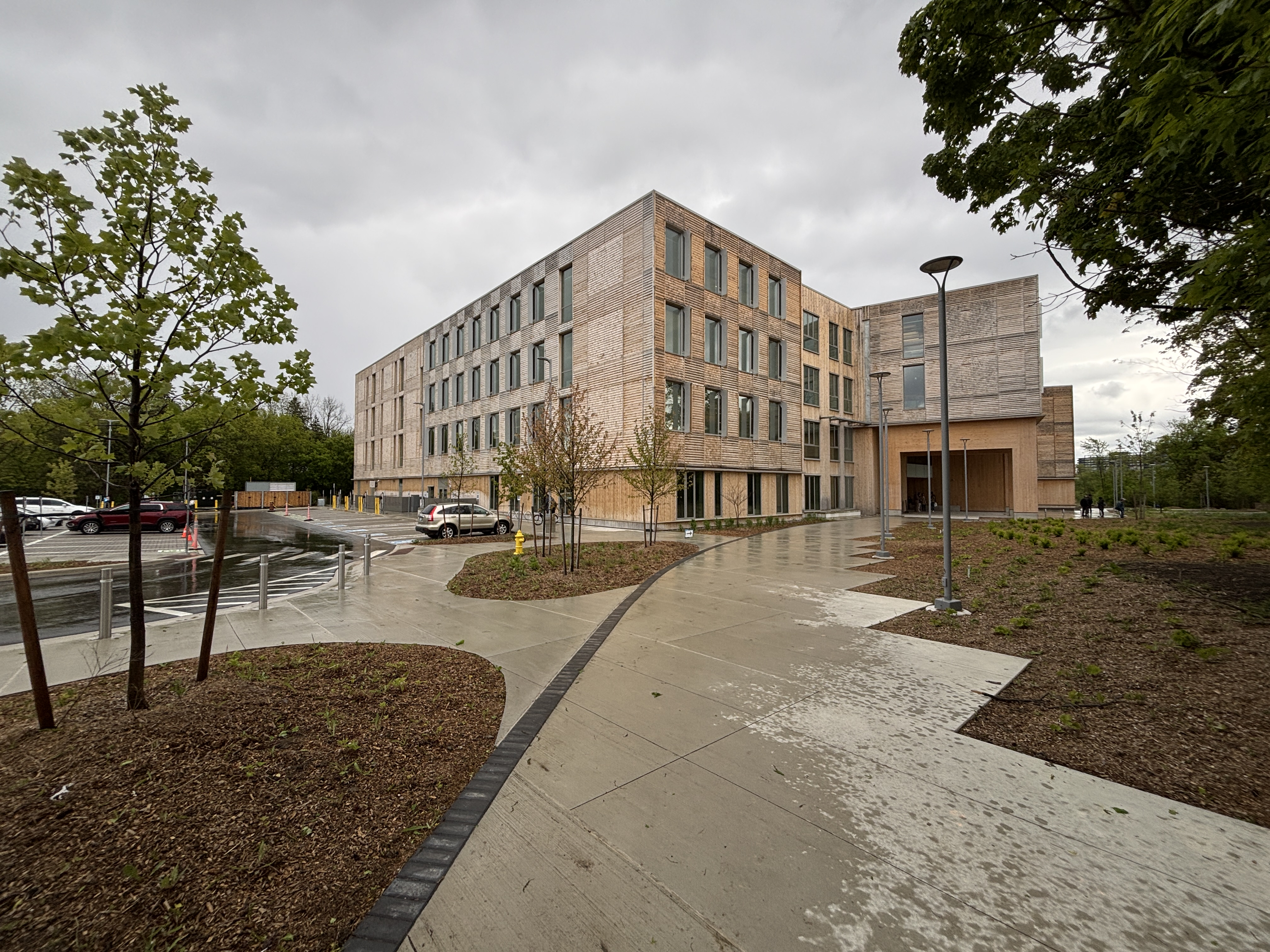
Toronto and Region Conservation Authority headquarters in North York

The Toronto and Region Conservation Authority (TRCA) is a conservation authority in southern Ontario, Canada. It owns about 16,000 hectares (40,000 acres) of land in the Toronto region, and it employs more than 400 full-time employees and coordinates more than 3,000 volunteers each year. TRCA's area of jurisdiction is watershed-based and includes 3,467 square kilometres (1,339 sq mi) – 2,506 on land and 961 water-based in Lake Ontario. This area comprises nine watersheds from west to east – Etobicoke Creek, Mimico Creek, Humber River, Don River, Highland Creek, Petticoat Creek, Rouge River, Duffins Creek and Carruthers Creek.

The lands that TRCA administers are used for flood control, recreation, education and watershed preservation activities, including drinking water source protection. On several sites, TRCA operates conservation areas open to the public for recreational use. TRCA also operates The Village at Black Creek, an open-air museum of 19th century buildings from around Ontario with 1860s period furnishings and decor. Several municipal parks inside and outside Toronto are located on TRCA lands, such as the Toronto Zoo, Humber Bay Park and Milne Park. TRCA operates five dams for flood control.

TRCA assists its partners in contributing to a healthy city region. This includes ecology and the study of water quality, natural habitats, plants, animals and more. It helps identify environmental needs, sets targets and restores natural areas. It advises partners about land use, development proposals and construction, and environmental education to help students and community members appreciate their local environment and learn to look after it. This work is focused in and around Toronto, including portions of the Regions of Peel, York and Durham.

== History ==
In 1946, a number of conservation authorities (CA) were established by the province to administer the numerous watersheds of the Toronto region (Don Valley CA, Etobicoke-Mimico CA, Humber Valley CA, Rouge CA, Duffins Creek CA, Highland Creek CA and Petticoat Creek CA) under the Conservation Authorities Act. These early conservation authorities were funded by the municipalities that bordered their valleys, and any land purchases had to be proposed and funded from either the Province of Ontario grants, local municipal levies or grants on a project-by-project basis. For example, in 1951, the Don Valley CA proposed a conservation area at the point where Lawrence Avenue today crosses the East Don River in Toronto. The Don Valley CA also proposed a halt on transportation uses in the valley. Funding was not approved for the project and the land was eventually used for the Don Valley Parkway project.

In conjunction with the formation of the conservation authorities, volunteer organizations sprang up to assist the conservation authorities in their missions. In Toronto, the Don Valley Conservation Association was established in 1946 by Roy Cadwell, Rand Freeland and Charles Sauriol to protect the lands of the Don River valley from a proposed development. The Association went on to other activities, including tree plantings, wildflower and tree preservation and advocacy. The Association organized popular 'conservation special' train outings from the Don Station north along the CNR line to Richmond Hill and other destinations to promote the conservation of the Don Valley. Sauriol would later become a director of the Metro Toronto and Region Conservation Authority (MTRCA).

Watershed management also included promoting activities such as recreation and public education on authority lands. The Humber Valley CA opened Albion Hills Conservation Area in Caledon as well as Dalziel Pioneer Park, around a historic 1809 barn located on farmland in the Humber River valley. The designated conservation areas charged daily use fees for the general public to use their facilities, unlike typical public parks.

After the deaths and damage of Hurricane Hazel in 1954, governments recognized the need for improved regulation of river floodplains. In 1957, the four Toronto-area authorities were merged into the single Metro Toronto and Region Conservation Authority and given full legal authority to purchase and expropriate lands for conservation. In conjunction with this, the Province of Ontario passed legislation that made building on floodplains illegal. The authority retained the name until 1997, when Metro Toronto was abolished.

In 1959, MTRCA developed its Plan for Flood Control and Water Conservation, which outlined a CDN $22 million plan of dam construction, flood channel construction and floodplain acquisition. In total, 15 dams, and four channels were to be built and 11,200 acres (4,500 ha) of land were to be acquired. The MTRCA constructed three of the 15 dams: Claireville, Milne and G. Ross Lord dam, plus others in Stouffville and on the Black Creek. The Authority constructed twelve flood control channels and two flood control dikes. Over 280 erosion control works were also constructed.

The MTRCA continued to operate the Dalziel Pioneer Park. In 1960, the MTRCA opened Black Creek Pioneer Village on the Stong Farm, at the corner of Jane and Steeles on the Black Creek, which expanded on the Dalziel lands. It subsequently added other pioneer buildings relocated from around the Toronto area. The village became a popular tourist destination in its own right.

In 1982, the MTRCA opened the Kortright Centre for Conservation in Woodbridge, Ontario. Its mission is to be "a center of excellence in the field of sustainable technology". The 325-hectare property hosts educational programs for students, workshops for industry and the general public, and technology demonstrations in a park-like setting.

== Properties ==
A list of parks and conservation areas under the TRCA:

- Altona Forest – Pickering
- Albion Hills Conservation Area and Campground – Caledon
- Boyd Conservation Area – Vaughan
- Bruce's Mill Conservation Area – Whitchurch–Stouffville
- Bathurst Glen Golf Course – Richmond Hill
- Black Creek Pioneer Village – Toronto
- Charles Sauriol Conservation Reserve – Toronto
- Claireville Conservation Area – Brampton
- Cold Creek Conservation Area – King
- East Duffins Headwaters – Uxbridge
- Glen Haffy Conservation Area – Caledon
- Glen Rouge Campground – Toronto
- Greenwood Conservation Area – Ajax
- Heart Lake Conservation Area – Brampton
- Indian Line Campground – Brampton
- Kortright Centre for Conservation – Vaughan
- Lake Saint George – Richmond Hill
- Langstaff EcoPark – Vaughan
- Oak Ridges Corridor Conservation Reserve – Richmond Hill
- Petticoat Creek Conservation Area – Pickering
- Tommy Thompson Park – Toronto

=== Associated properties ===
- Humber Bay Shores Waterfront Park – Toronto
- Toronto Zoo sits on land mostly controlled by the TRCA.

== See also ==
- Conservation Authorities Act
- Rouge Park - previously managed by TRCA separately from their conservation areas
- Toronto Parks, Forestry and Recreation Division
- Toronto ravine system
- Credit Valley Conservation, a neighbouring conservation authority that oversees the Credit River watershed
