= Municipal government of King, Ontario =

The municipal government of King, Ontario consists of the mayor and six councillors who are elected to office during the municipal elections in Ontario or who are acclaimed to office because their candidacy is unopposed. It also includes civic staff responsible for the operational affairs of the township.

== Wards ==
The six wards of King. The varying shades of each colour represent the polling areas for that ward.

A ward system was proposed by William Hodgson during a speech he delivered at the township's electoral nomination meeting on 20 November 1961.

The municipality is subdivided into six geopolitical wards. Ward 1 encompasses the region east of Keele Street and west of Bathurst Street, from the township's southern boundary to 19th Sideroad in the north. This includes the eastern portion of King City, and the communities of Eversley, Snowball, and Temperanceville. Ward 2 extends from Highway 400 in the east to 10th concession in the west, from the township's southern boundary to 15th sideroad in the north. It includes the communities of King Creek, Laskay, Nobleton, and Strange. Ward 3 covers all the western portion of the township, from its western border to the 10th concession, and also all the area east of Highway 400 that lies north of the 15th Sideroad and south of the 18th Sideroad. The communities of Hammertown, Happy Valley, Holly Park, Linton, and New Scotland are located in ward 3.

Ward 4 consists of the area east of the 10th concession and west of Highway 400, north of the 18th sideroad, and south the northern boundary of the township at its western end and of Highway 9 at its eastern end. It includes the communities of Lloydtown, Pottageville, and Schomberg. Ward 5 extends from the township's southern boundary to 19th Sideroad in the north, between Highway 400 in the west and Keele Street in the east. The western portion of King City and the communities of Kettleby and Kinghorn are located in ward 5. The northeastern portion of the township, north of Highway 9 west of Highway 400, and north of the 19th Sideroad east of Highway 400, is in ward 6. It includes the communities of Ansnorveldt and Glenville.

== Council ==
The council of the township includes the mayor and six councillors. The mayor is Steve Pelligrini, and the councillors are Jordan Cescolini (ward 1), David Boyd (ward 2), Jakob Schneider (ward 3), Bill Cober (ward 4), Debbie Schaefer (ward 5), and Avia Eek (ward 6).

Upon election, the mayor automatically becomes a councillor for York Regional Council, its only representative from King. This automatic representation of an elected individual to a second council is known as a double direct election.

== Elections ==
During municipal elections, electors cast ballots for candidate councillors and school board trustees representing their ward. Each year, the municipal government sets aside approximately $30,000 of revenues to allocate toward the cost of the municipal election.

In the 1800s, many elections were resolved by acclamation as candidates often had no opposition; the Newmarket Era issue of 16 December 1887 stated that "King Township usually elects by acclamation" when discussing the impending election of January 1888 for which the reeve and 3rd deputy reeve were acclaimed.

In 1873, a third deputy reeve was added to King Council as a result of a population increase, and specifically the number of properties on the tax roll. In the December 1962 municipal election, the electorate voted in favour of increasing councillor terms from one year to two years.

The creation of the Regional Municipality of York and the reorganization of its constituent municipalities in 1971 resulted in the abolition of the positions of reeve and deputy reeve, and created the position of mayor.

In 1910, the township electorate rejected a local option, voting in favour of the measure 741–515 but short of attaining the required 60% overall vote to pass the measure by 13 votes. In 1912, there was a 126–34 vote in favour of a local option.

In the late 1930s, the council passed an election bylaw under which terms councillors elected or acclaimed to office would hold that office for two years. It first applied to the December 1940 election, for which no candidate was opposed and all were elected by acclamation.

=== Councillors ===
Council representatives for Township of King († denotes candidate was acclaimed to office)
Year	Reeve	1st Deputy Reeve	2nd Deputy Reeve	3rd Deputy Reeve	Councillor	Councillor	Councillor
December 1854	George Hughes					N/A	N/A
December 1858	John D. Phillips	William Moore	Arthur Armstrong	J. Ireland	James P. Wells	N/A	N/A
December 1859	James P. Wells	Andrew Davis	William Moore	R. Machell	Arthur Armstrong	N/A	N/A
December 1860	James P. Wells^{†}	Andrew Davis^{†}	William Moore^{†}	Albert Webb	Arthur Armstrong	N/A	N/A
December 1861	James P. Wells	Andrew Davis	Albert Webb	William Moore	Alexander Thompson	N/A	-
December 1862	James P. Wells	Albert Webb				N/A	N/A
December 1867	Joseph Stokes^{†}	Machell	Thompson			N/A	N/A
December 1869	Albert Webb^{†}	William Munsie	Joel Phillips	Arthur Armstrong	Andrew Davis	James Bell	William Proctor
December 1870	William Munsie	Joel Phillips	John D. Phillips	William Bell	James Rogers	N/A	N/A
December 1871	William Munsie^{†}	Joel Phillips^{†}	John D. Phillips^{†}			N/A	N/A
January 1873	William Munsie	Joel Phillips	James Rogers	James Bell	N/A	N/A	N/A
January 1874	John D. Phillips^{†}	Joseph Stokes	James Rogers	Charles Irwin	Arthur Armstrong	N/A	N/A
December 1874	John D. Phillips	James C. Stokes	Charles Hambly	Charles Irwin	Arthur Armstrong	N/A	N/A
January 1876	Joseph Stokes	James C. Stokes^{†}	Charles Hambly^{†}	Charles Irwin^{†}	Arthur Armstrong^{†}	N/A	N/A
December 1876	Joseph Stokes^{†}	James C. Stokes^{†}	Charles Hambly^{†}	Arthur Armstrong^{†}	Elihu Davis^{†}	N/A	N/A
December 1877	Joseph Stokes	James C. Stokes	Charles Hambly	Arthur Armstrong	Elihu Davis	N/A	N/A
December 1878	Joseph Stokes	James C. Stokes	Charles Hambly	Arthur Armstrong	Elihu Davis	N/A	N/A
December 1879	Joseph Stokes^{†}	James C. Stokes^{†}	Charles Hambly^{†}	Arthur Armstrong^{†}	Elihu Davis^{†}	N/A	N/A
December 1880	Joseph Stokes^{†}	James C. Stokes^{†}	Charles Hambly^{†}	Arthur Armstrong^{†}	Elihu Davis^{†}	N/A	N/A
January 1882	Joseph Stokes	Charles Hambly	Charles Irwin	Elihu Davis	Thomas Wilson	N/A	N/A
January 1883	Elihu Davis^{†}	Charles Irwin^{†}	Thomas Wilson^{†}	Michael J. O'Neil^{†}	Robert Norman^{†}	N/A	N/A
December 1883	Elihu Davis	Charles Irwin	Michael J. O'Neil	Robert Norman	John Black	N/A	N/A
December 1884	Elihu Davis^{†}	Charles Irwin^{†}	Michael J. O'Neil^{†}	Robert Norman^{†}	John Black^{†}	N/A	N/A
January 1886	Elihu Davis^{†}	Charles Irwin	James Cherry	Robert Norman^{†}	John Black	N/A	N/A
January 1887	Robert Norman^{†}	John H. Ross	James Cherry	John Black	Stephen W. Armitage^{†}	N/A	N/A
January 1888	Robert Norman^{†}	John H. Ross	Archibald Campbell	John Black^{†}	Stephen W. Armitage	N/A	N/A
January 1889	James O. Stokes	John H. Ross^{†}	Archibald Campbell^{†}	Stephen W. Armitage	Arthur Armstrong	N/A	N/A
January 1890	James O. Stokes^{†}	John H. Ross^{†}	Archibald Campbell^{†}	Stephen W. Armitage^{†}	Arthur Armstrong^{†}	N/A	N/A
January 1891	James O. Stokes	Archibald Campbell^{†}	Stephen W. Armitage^{†}	Simeon Lemon	James Cherry	N/A	N/A
December 1891	James O. Stokes^{†}	Archibald Campbell^{†}	Stephen W. Armitage^{†}	Simeon Lemon^{†}	James Cherry^{†}	N/A	N/A
January 1893	James C. Stokes	A. McCallum	Robert McCutcheon	Simeon Lemon	James Cherry	N/A	N/A
January 1894	James C. Stokes^{†}	A. McCallum^{†}	Robert McCutcheon^{†}	Simeon Lemon^{†}	James Cherry^{†}	N/A	N/A
January 1895	James C. Stokes^{†}	A. McCallum	Robert McCutcheon	Simeon Lemon	James Cherry^{†}	N/A	N/A
January 1896	Robert Norman	A. McCallum^{†}	Robert McCutcheon^{†}	Simeon Lemon	James Cherry^{†}	N/A	N/A
January 1897	James Cherry	Robert McCutcheon^{†}	Stephen W. Armitage	John Hambly	C.H. Legge	N/A	N/A
Year	Reeve	Councillor	Councillor	Councillor	Councillor	Councillor	Councillor
January 1899	Simeon Lemon^{†}	C.H Legge	Burns	Davis	Gallagher	N/A	N/A
January 1900	Simeon Lemon	C.H. Legge	Robert Gallagher	J.W. Burns	Joseph Rogers	N/A	N/A
January 1901	Simeon Lemon	J.W. Burns	J.W Crossley	Robert Gallagher	Joseph Rogers	N/A	N/A
January 1902	J.W Crossley	Joseph Rogers	H.F. Legge	R.W. Phillips	Stephen W. Armitage	N/A	N/A
January 1903	T.H. Legge	J.W. Larkin	R.W. Phillips	Stephen W. Armitage	Alexander McMurchy	N/A	N/A
January 1905	T.H. Legge	R.W. Phillips	Stephen W. Armitage	Alexander McMurchy	John Wells	N/A	N/A
January 1906	T.H. Legge	Alexander McMurchy	Norman	Deacon	Burns	N/A	N/A
January 1907	T.H. Legge	Alexander McMurchy^{†}	R.W. Phillips	William Duggan	A.C. Wells	N/A	N/A
January 1908	John Armstrong	Alexander McMurchy^{†}	Burns	Deacon	R.W. Phillips	N/A	N/A
January 1909	Alexander McMurchy^{†}	R.W. Phillips^{†}	William Duggan	A.C. Wells	Carley	N/A	N/A
January 1910	Alexander McMurchy	R.W. Phillips	Lemon	A.C. Wells	William Duggan	N/A	N/A
January 1912	Alexander McMurchy	William J. Wells	S. Lemon	John A. Watson	B. McCabe	N/A	N/A
January 1913	Alexander McMurchy^{†}	William J. Wells	Cornelius F. McCabe	J. A. Watson	Lemon	N/A	N/A
January 1915		John A. Watson				N/A	N/A
January 1916	William J. Wells^{†}	Cornelius F. McCabe	T.A. McCutcheon	Edward J. Kaake	Aaron Campbell	N/A	N/A
January 1917	William J. Wells^{†}	Cornelius F. McCabe	T.A. McCutcheon	Edward J. Kaake	Aaron Campbell	N/A	N/A
January 1918	William J. Wells	Arthur McCutcheon	Edward J. Kaake^{†}	John L. Dolson^{†}	Thomas McMurchy^{†}	N/A	N/A
January 1919	William J. Wells	Arthur McCutcheon^{†}	Thomas McMurchy	John L. Dolson	Edward J. Kaake	N/A	N/A
January 1920	Arthur McCutcheon	Thomas McMurchy	John A. Wilkie	E. Milton Legge	Wesley H. Walls	N/A	N/A
January 1921	Arthur McCutcheon^{†}	John L. Dolson	E. Milton Legge	John A. Wilkie	Wesley H. Walls	N/A	N/A
January 1922	Alexander McMurchy	Leslie Wells	Frank A. Egan	Calvin Doan	John J. Edwards	N/A	N/A
January 1923	Alexander McMurchy	E. Milton Legge	Thomas McMurchy	Joseph Duggan	Frank A. Egan	N/A	N/A
January 1924	Alexander McMurchy	E. Milton Legge	Thomas McMurchy	Joseph Duggan	A.B. Wells	N/A	N/A
January 1926	Alexander McMurchy	Thomas McMurchy	Joseph Duggan^{†}	Elton A. Armstrong	Frank A. Egan	N/A	N/A
January 1927	Alexander McMurchy	Thomas McMurchy^{†}	Joseph Duggan^{†}	Elton A. Armstrong	Frank A. Egan	N/A	N/A
January 1928	E. Milton Legge	Elton A. Armstrong	Frank A. Egan	Norman D. McMurchy	J.P. Jefferson	N/A	N/A
January 1931	E. Milton Legge	Norman D. McMurchy	J.P. Jefferson	Geoffrey J. Fox	Cameron E. Walkington	N/A	N/A
Year	Reeve	Deputy Reeve	Councillor	Councillor	Councillor	Councillor	Councillor
1933	Norman D. MacMurchy	J.P. Jefferson	John S. Lawson	Thomas MacMurchy	Geoffrey J. Fox	N/A	N/A
1935	Norman D. MacMurchy	J.P. Jefferson	Lorne B. Goodfellow	John S. Lawson	Geoffrey J. Fox	N/A	N/A
1936	J.P. Jefferson	John S. Lawson	Lorne B. Goodfellow	Thomas McMurchy	Cameron E. Walkington	N/A	N/A
1937	J.P. Jefferson	Cameron E. Walkington	Thomas McMurchy	Lorne B. Goodfellow	E. Milton Legge	N/A	N/A
1938	J.P. Jefferson		Burnel Graham			N/A	N/A
1938			Burnel Graham			N/A	N/A
1939	Thomas McMurchy		Burnel Graham		William E. Barker	N/A	N/A
December 1940	Thomas McMurchy	Lorne B. Goodfellow	Cameron Walkington	E. Milton Legge	William E. Barker	Victor Marchant	N/A,
1949	Elton Armstrong	T. Arthur McCutcheon				N/A	N/A
1950	Elton Armstrong	T. Arthur McCutcheon				N/A	N/A
1951	Elton Armstrong	T. Arthur McCutcheon			Russell Snyder	N/A	N/A
December 1952	Elton Armstrong^{†}	William Hodgson	Wilfred Aitchison	Douglas Wellesley	William Kehoe	N/A	N/A
December 1953	Elton Armstrong^{†}	William Hodgson^{†}	Wilfred Aitchison^{†}	William Kehoe^{†}	Douglas Wellesley^{†}	N/A	N/A
December 1954	Elton Armstrong^{†}	William Hodgson	Wilfred Aitchison	William Kehoe	Raymond Jennings	N/A	N/A
December 1955	William Hodgson	Wilfred Aitchison	Raymond Jennings	Douglas Wellesley	Douglas Hutchins	N/A	N/A
1956	William Hodgson					N/A	N/A
1957	William Hodgson					N/A	N/A
1958	William Hodgson					N/A	N/A
1959	William Hodgson	Norman D. MacMurchy	Jack C. Rouble	Blyth J. Langdon	Gordon Cook	N/A	N/A
1960	William Hodgson		Gordon Cook			N/A	N/A
1961	William Hodgson	Norman D. MacMurchy	Gordon Cook	Jack C. Rouble	William Curran	N/A	N/A
1962	Raymond Jennings	Gordon Cook	William Curran	Kenneth MacTaggart	Jack C. Rouble	N/A	N/A
1965	Gordon Cook					N/A	N/A
1967	Gordon Cook^{†}	Kenneth MacTaggart	Ernest F. Crossland	Cyril Flinders	Gordon Rowe	N/A	N/A
1969	Gordon Cook^{†}	Kenneth MacTaggart	Margaret Britnell			N/A	N/A
Year	Mayor	Councillor	Councillor	Councillor	Councillor	Councillor	Councillor
1971	Kenneth Mactaggart	Donald Findlay	Len Osin	Ben Rough	Murray Sheardown	Jack van Lyuk	Roy Wilson
1972	Margaret Britnell						
1976	Margaret Britnell						
1978	Margaret Britnell						
1980							
1982							
Year	Mayor	Ward 1	Ward 2	Ward 3	Ward 4	Ward 5	Ward 6
1985						Margaret Britnell	
1988	Margaret Britnell						
1991	Margaret Britnell	Margaret Black					
1994	Margaret Black			Linda Pabst		Margaret Britnell	
1997	Margaret Black			Linda Pabst			
2000	Margaret Black	Steve Pellegrini		Linda Pabst			
2003	Margaret Black	Steve Pellegrini		Linda Pabst			
2006	Margaret Black	Cleve Mortelliti	Jeff Laidlaw	Linda Pabst	Bill Cober	Jane Underhill	Jack Rupke
2010	Steve Pellegrini	Cleve Mortelliti^{†}	Peter Grandilli	Linda Pabst	Bill Cober	Debbie Schaefer	Avia Eek
2014	Steve Pellegrini^{†}	Cleve Mortelliti^{†}	Dave Boyd	Linda Pabst	Bill Cober	Debbie Schaefer	Avia Eek
2018	Steve Pellegrini^{†}	Jordan Cescolini	David Boyd	Jakob Schneider	Bill Cober	Debbie Schaefer	Avia Eek
2022	Steve Pellegrini^{†}	Jordan Cescolini	David Boyd^{†}	Jennifer Anstey	Mary Asselstine	Debbie Schaefer	Avia Eek^{†}
2026	Steve Pellegrini	Jordan Cescolini	David Boyd^{†}	Jennifer Anstey^{†}	Mary Asselstine	Ivan Rapa	Avia Eek^{†}

Voter turnout was 45% for the 2010 election and 33% for the 2014 election.

For the 2014 municipal elections, the mayor Steve Pellegrini and ward 1 councillor Cleve Mortelliti are acclaimed.

=== School board trustees ===
School board trustees are elected for four school boards operating in King. An elector may cast a ballot for a candidate trustee for one of those school boards, determined by the "Direction of School Support" associated with the elector's municipal property tax statement per Section 6 of the provincial Assessment Act. Public school trustees represent the York Region District School Board (YRDSB) or the French immersion board Conseil Scolaire Viamonde (CSV). Separate public school trustees represent the York Catholic District School Board (YCDSB) or the French immersion Conseil scolaire de district catholique Centre-Sud (CSDCCS).

The elected trustee of the YRDSB represents all wards in King and Aurora. The schools represented in King by this trustee are King City Secondary School, King City Public School, Kettleby Public School, Nobleton Public School, and Schomberg Public School.

The elected trustee of the YCDSB represents all wards in King, Aurora, and Whitchurch–Stouffville. The schools represented in King by this trustee are Holy Name Catholic Elementary School in King City, St. Mary Catholic Elementary School in Nobleton, and St. Patrick Catholic Elementary School in Schomberg.

School board representatives for Township of King († denotes candidate was acclaimed to office)
Year	Public		Public separate	
Year	YRDSB	CSV	YCDSB	CSDCCS
2010	Gord Kerr	René Laurin	Elizabeth Crowe^{†}	Yves Lévesque^{†}
2014	Peter Adams-Luchowki	François Guérin	Elizabeth Crowe	Caroline Bourret

Gord Kerr was elected as the trustee for the YRDSB in 2010. He resigned from office in 2012, and was replaced by Peter Adams-Luchowki.

== Municipal office ==
In 1952, the township's municipal office was located in Nobleton. In 1956, council purchased land west of Highway 400 on which to construct a municipal office building.

The Township offices were moved to the King City Plaza, a strip mall purchased by the municipal government in the 1990s which also has several business tenants. In 2013, the township purchased the disused former Holy Name Catholic Elementary School building and adjacent 10 acres (40,000 m^{2}) of land from the York Catholic District School Board for $2.95 million. In 2016, township planning staff announced that the 360 square metres (3,900 sq ft) school building would be redesigned for use as office space for the township, for community and non-profit groups, and to house a satellite office for the York Regional Police. In May 2016, the Police Services Board of York Regional Police approved the King City substation and announced that a 20-year lease would be executed for use of about 280 square metres (3,000 sq ft) of space in the building.

The school building was demolished during mid 2016. In June 2016, township staff announced the construction of a 4,050 square metres (43,600 sq ft) structure on the site at a cost of about $15 million, updated to 4,150 square metres (44,700 sq ft) and $21.5 million in late 2016. Of that cost, $13.1 million was for construction, and the remainder for associated charges, including moving municipal staff from the previous offices. It includes a 6,000 square feet (560 m^{2}) public-use gymnasium. The capital project was partially financed by selling the strip mall for $10.75 million, with the remainder obtained from a $4 million debenture, $4.5 million from the infrastructure reserve fund, $1.5 million from development charges, and a $1 million capital contribution from the Regional Municipality of York. The facility has a geothermal heat pump system, and charging stations for electric vehicles. The former strip mall was demolished in January 2022.

In December 2018, the new municipal building was opened for the inaugural session of a new council following the 2018 municipal elections. The preceding council had approved the $40,000 purchase of Steel Gorgeous, an iron horse sculpture created by Kendall McCulloch, for installation at the municipal office. The sculpture had been lent by the artist to Caledon Equestrian Park in Palgrave for the equestrian events during the 2015 Pan American Games.
