= William Mulock =

Canadian politician

The Right Honourable Sir William Mulock PC KCMG KC
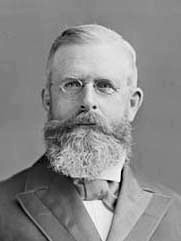
- Mulock at age 53 (1896)

18th Chancellor of the University of Toronto
- In office 1924–1944
- President: Robert Falconer; Henry John Cody
- Preceded by: Byron Edmund Walker
- Succeeded by: Henry John Cody

Acting Lieutenant Governor of Ontario
- In office 25 October 1931 – 1 November 1932
- Monarch: George V
- Governor General: The Earl of Bessborough
- Premier: George Stewart Henry
- Preceded by: William Donald Ross
- Succeeded by: Herbert Alexander Bruce

Chief Justice of Ontario
- In office 1923–1936
- Preceded by: Sir William Ralph Meredith
- Succeeded by: Newton Rowell

Member of the Canadian Parliament for York North
- In office 20 June 1882 – 15 October 1905
- Preceded by: Frederick William Strange
- Succeeded by: Allen Bristol Aylesworth

Personal details
- Born: 19 January 1843 Bond Head, Canada West
- Died: 1 October 1944 (aged 101) Toronto, Ontario, Canada
- Spouse: Sarah Ellen Crowther
- Children: 6
- Education: University of Toronto
- Occupation: Lawyer, businessman, educator, farmer, politician, judge, and philanthropist
- Known for: Federation of University of Toronto, Imperial Penny Post, Canadian Department of Labour, bringing Mackenzie King into public life

Military service
- Allegiance: Canada
- Branch/service: Canadian militia
- Years of service: 1862–1866
- Rank: Private
- Unit: Queen's Own Rifles of Canada
- Battles/wars: Fenian Raids

Sir William Mulock (19 January 1843 – 1 October 1944) was a Canadian lawyer, businessman, educator, farmer, politician, judge, and philanthropist. He served as vice-chancellor of the University of Toronto from 1881 to 1900, negotiating the federation of denominational colleges and professional schools into a modern university.

He was elected to the House of Commons of Canada as a Liberal Member of Parliament and served from 1882 to 1905. Sir Wilfrid Laurier appointed him to the Canadian Cabinet as Postmaster General from 1896 to 1905. In 1900, Mulock established the Department of Labour, bringing William Lyon Mackenzie King into public life as his Deputy Minister.

He initiated the final agreement for a transpacific cable linking Canada to Australia and New Zealand, and he funded Marconi to establish the first transatlantic radio link from North America to Europe. In 1905, he chaired the parliamentary inquiry into telephones that led to regulation of Canadian telecommunications, and he participated in the negotiations that led to the creation of the provinces of Alberta and Saskatchewan.

He was Chief Justice of the Exchequer Division of the Supreme Court of Ontario from 1905 until appointed by King in 1923 as Chief Justice of the Supreme Court of Ontario, a position he held until 1936. From 1931 to 1932, he served as the acting Lieutenant Governor of Ontario.

Mulock was extremely active in both business and the community, being involved in the foundation of organizations as diverse as the Toronto-Dominion Bank, the Toronto Star, Toronto Wellesley Hospital, and Canada's first national peace organization. In later life, he was known as the "Grand Old Man" of Canada.

== Early life ==
Mulock was born in Bond Head, Canada West, the son of Irish immigrant Thomas Homan Mulock and Mary, the daughter of John Cawthra. His father, a physician educated in Dublin at the Royal College of Surgeons and the Medical School of Trinity College, died when Mulock was four years old. His mother then moved the family to Newmarket, Ontario, where he was educated at the Newmarket Grammar School.

Mulock's older brother, John, died in 1852; he had two sisters, Marian and Rosamund (later married to George W. Monk). The family endured genteel poverty after the father's death, so Mulock spent much time chopping wood, milking the family cow, growing vegetables in the family garden, and on outside work such as repairing the local corduroy roads.

== University of Toronto ==
=== Student ===
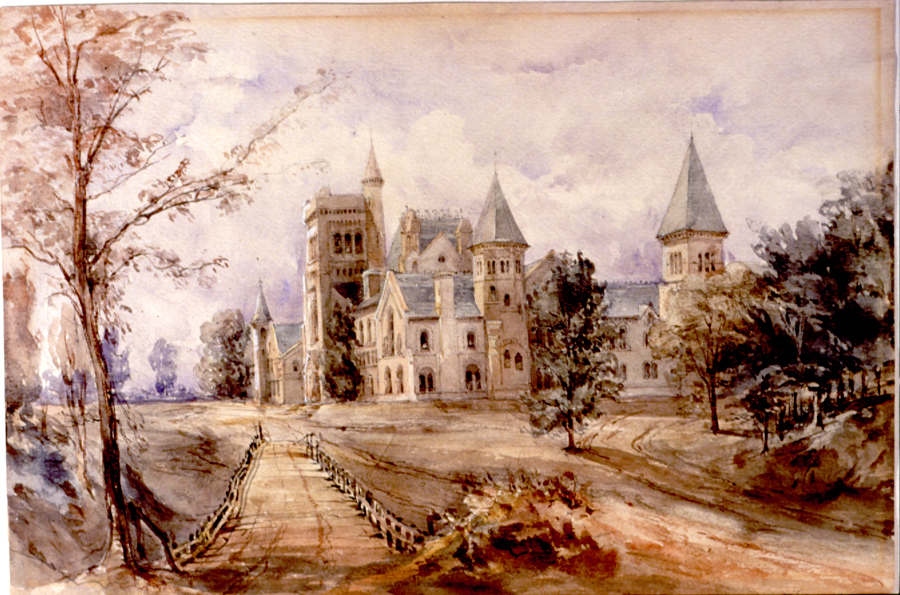
University College in 1859

Mulock entered the new University College in Toronto in 1859; his classmates included J. M. Gibson, W. D. Lesueur, and W. B. McMurrich. On 9 November 1861, Mulock captained one of the teams in the first gridiron football game ever recorded. During the Trent Affair of 1862, Mulock asked the head of the college, John McCaul, to call a student meeting that led to the formation of the University Company of volunteers, later K Company of the Queen's Own Rifles. At the time of the Fenian Raids in 1866, Mulock received training at the Royal Military School and served in the regiment for three weeks, but he never saw action.

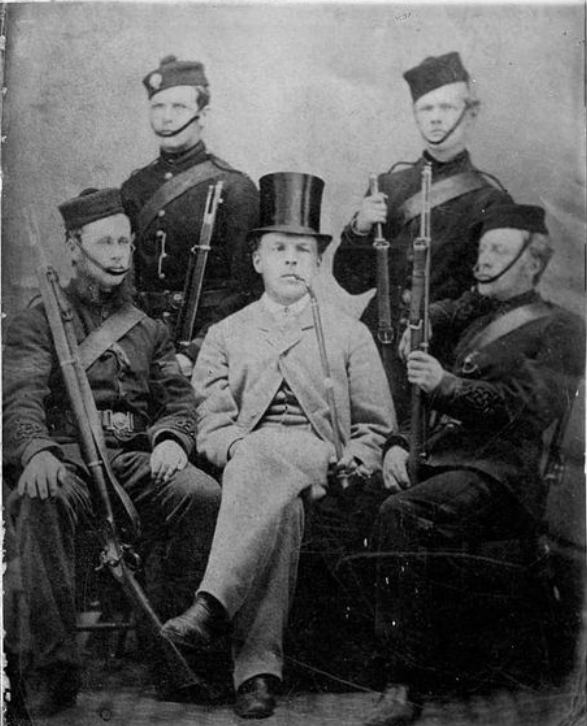
William Mulock, back left, Queens Own Rifles, 1866

Starting at the same time that Mulock arrived, Egerton Ryerson led a sustained attack on the university over money and the proper purpose of a university education. Ryerson did not think that modern languages or history, practical courses, nor even law or medicine belonged in a university, and a Royal Commission was struck which recommended that the endowment of the university be distributed among all Ontario colleges. The defence of the university culminated in a large meeting at the St. Lawrence Hall on 5 March 1863, where Mulock moved the concluding motion. These efforts allowed the University to "escape extinction", according to Sir Daniel Wilson.

After graduating in 1863 with the Gold Medal for Modern Languages, Mulock became a law student, first articled to Alfred Boultbee in Newmarket, and then in Toronto, eventually in the firm of Senator John Ross. To support himself, Mulock became a house-master at Upper Canada College. Mulock was called to the bar in 1868.

=== University senator (1873–1944) ===
After graduating, Mulock, Edward Blake, Thomas Moss, and James Loudon led the struggle to broaden the University of Toronto Senate to include elected members. As a result, Ontario Minister of Education Adam Crooks passed legislation in 1873 that added 15 new senators elected by the alumni. Mulock was elected and remained a member for 71 years. Mulock moved and passed the first requirement that university finances be reported to the senate and made public. Largely due to the efforts of Mulock and Loudon, in 1876 a School of Science was established and in 1878 an independent School of Practical Science (which joined the university in 1889 as the Faculty of Applied Science and Engineering).

In 1873, the Law Society of Upper Canada established a law school, and Mulock soon became Lecturer and Examiner in Equity. After the school closed in 1878, the Osgoode Literary and Legal Society attempted to provide replacement instruction, with Mulock lecturing on partnership. When Mulock became Vice-Chancellor, one of his goals was to establish the best law faculty on the continent.

=== Vice-Chancellor (1881–1900) ===
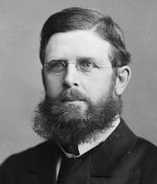
Mulock in 1883

Mulock was elected Vice-Chancellor in 1881. The University of Toronto then consisted of two small buildings, and the rest of higher education in Ontario was distributed among a variety of denominational colleges and small independent professional schools. Mulock believed that a single federated university would be more efficient, less expensive, and provide better educational opportunities to students, especially in sciences and the professions. He negotiated around resistance from many quarters, leading to the Federation Act in 1887 and affiliation (and later federation) with St. Michael's College in 1881, Wycliffe College and Knox College in 1885, the Ontario College of Agriculture and the Royal College of Dental Surgeons in 1888, Victoria College, the Ontario Medical College for Women and the Toronto College of Music in 1890, the College of Pharmacy in 1891, the Toronto Conservatory of Music in 1896, and the Ontario Veterinary College in 1897. In opposition to followers of John Rolph who believed medical education should be paid for by students since they would soon have a good income treating patients, Mulock thought it better to reduce disease by spending public money to train doctors. The Federation Act established new faculties of medicine and law. Mulock efforts were not popular with everyone, but he survived several attempts to remove him from office, resigning in 1900 because of his increased political responsibilities. As part of his internecine battles, Mulock secretly aided William Lyon Mackenzie King and other student leaders of the February 1895 student strike.

In June 1893, Mulock provided the articling position needed by pioneering student-at-law Clara Brett Martin. Martin was so badly treated by her fellow male students that she eventually switched to another firm, but in 1897 she became the first female lawyer in the British Empire.

In 1897, Mulock hired surgeon Herbert Bruce into the Faculty of Medicine without consultation. Mulock later helped finance Bruce's new Wellesley Hospital and was the first chair of its board of directors.

The University awarded Mulock an Honorary Doctorate of Laws in 1894. While Vice-Chancellor, Mulock accepted no salary, and the money accumulated was donated to the university.

In 1906, the elected office of Vice-Chancellor was abolished; the unelected President of the University took over as Chair of the Senate. Mulock later spoke out against this "reactionary step", especially since the act also "put the elected members of the senate in a hopeless minority" and reduced the senate's responsibilities to academic matters only.

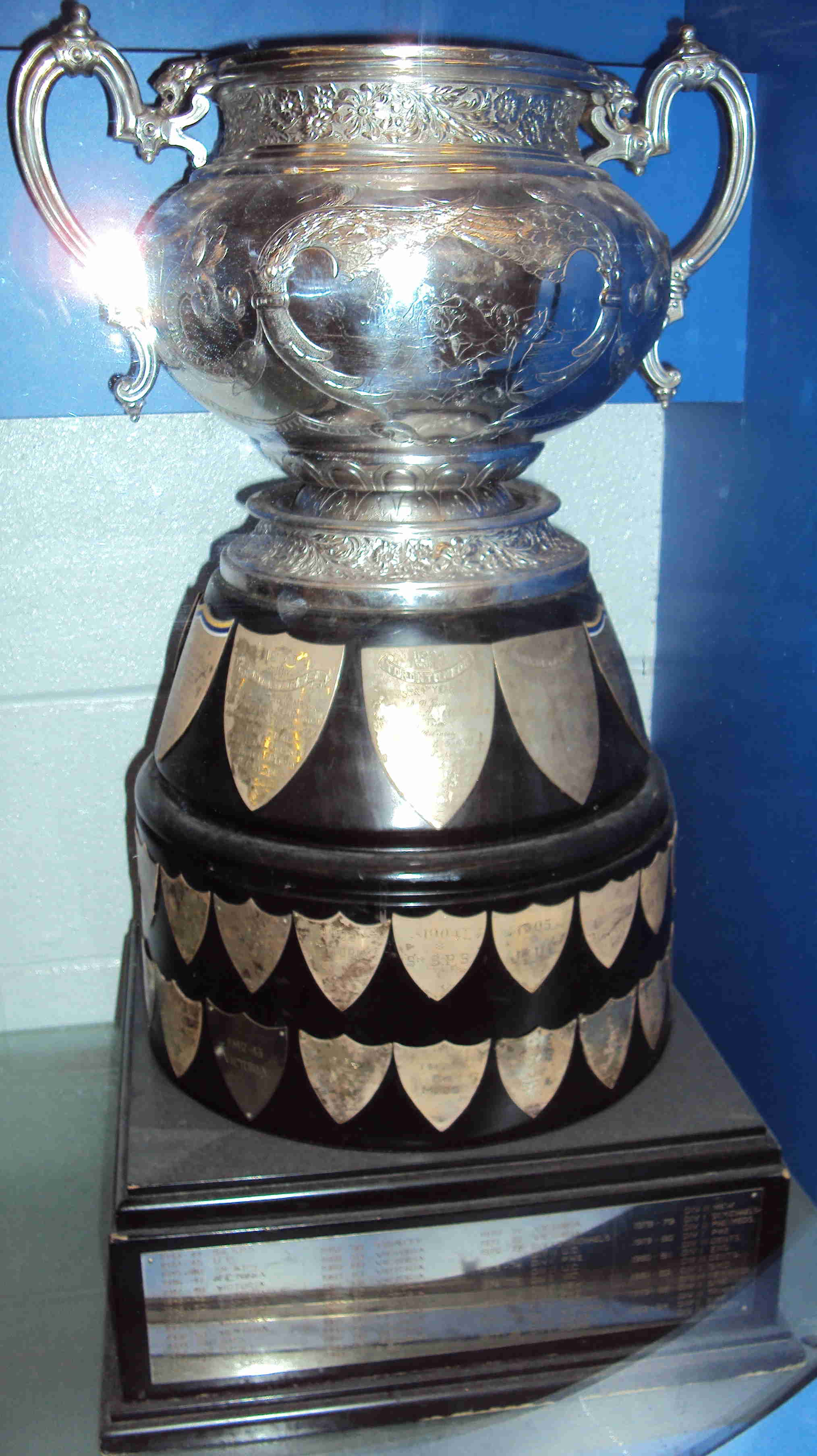
Mulock Cup

=== Chancellor (1924–1944) ===
After Sir William Meredith's death in 1923, Mulock was nominated for the primarily ceremonial role of Chancellor. Mulock was supported by most elected representatives, but opposed by most professors. The senate elected Sir Edmund Walker, but Walker died shortly thereafter. Mulock was subsequently elected unanimously as Chancellor on 28 April 1924 and served until his death.

Mulock's proudest achievements were his contributions to the University of Toronto. His memorials at the university include the Mulock Cup, Canada's oldest continuously awarded sporting trophy, the William Mulock Prize in Mathematics and Physics, the William Mulock Prize in Classics, and Mulock House in Whitney Hall residence.

== Politics and law ==
Mulock was unsuccessful in his first attempt in entering politics in December 1881. He was among a crowded field contesting the Liberal (Reform) Party nomination in York North, where the previous Liberal MP lost the preceding election by four votes. He was the last contestant standing before losing to the eventual nominee Dr. Joseph Henry Widdifield, the local Liberal MPP since 1875. Widdifield however resigned his nomination a few months later as his home community of Newmarket was gerrymandered out of the electoral district to York East, where former Prime Minister Alexander MacKenzie was nominated as the Liberal candidate. In the nomination convention held in May 1882, just a month ahead of the general election, Mulock, though also from Newmarket was nominated without competition. The Conservative incumbent, Dr. Frederick William Strange, had shocked his own supporters two months earlier by declining to be renominated, and was replaced by a Mr. James Anderson, who Mulock defeated in the 1882 election. Mulock was reelected five more times between 1887 and 1904.

Mulock remained in Opposition through two subsequent elections until 1896 when the Liberals under Wilfrid Laurier took power. In order to provide "clean government", Mulock raised sufficient funds that year to provide Laurier with financial independence.

=== Postmaster General (1896–1905) ===
Laurier appointed Mulock as Postmaster General. He inherited an inefficient bureaucracy that was losing almost a million dollars a year, but he believed that improved service and lower prices would increase revenue and better connect Canada and the British Empire. He campaigned for lower rates throughout the Empire, and when met by resistance decided to go it alone, announcing that at the end of 1897 Canada would unilaterally lower the letter rate to Britain from five to three cents. In response, a conference of all British Empire postal authorities was called for in mid 1898. Over the objections of the Australian colonies and New Zealand, Mulock succeeded in implementing an Imperial Penny Post. Mulock also took advantage of this meeting to negotiate the final financial agreement for the transpacific cable first proposed by Sir Sandford Fleming to link Canada to Australia and New Zealand. The cable was completed on 31 October 1902, finishing the All Red Line. By 1903, the Post Office was generating a surplus of almost a million dollars a year.

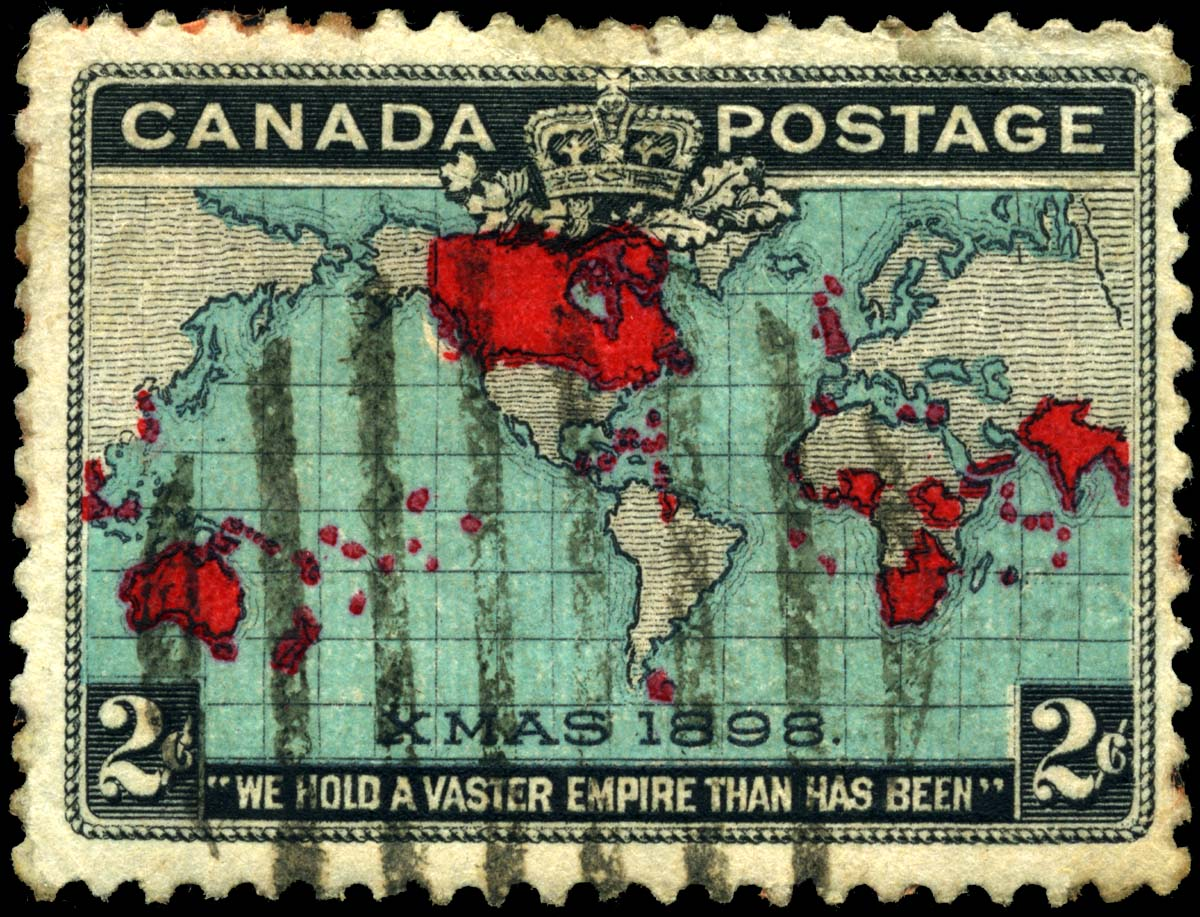
1898 Christmas stamp

To mark the start of the Imperial Penny Post, Mulock personally designed and issued a new stamp with a map of the world showing the extent of the British Empire. Partly by accident, this became the world's first Christmas stamp.

On 1 April 1898, Mulock introduced an amendment to the Post Office Act that made Canada the first country in the world to give franking privileges, i.e. free postage, for Braille materials and books for the blind. He also initiated a program to provide Post Office employment for the deaf.

After the first successful transatlantic radio communication in 1901 to his station at Signal Hill, Dominion of Newfoundland, Guglielmo Marconi learned that the Anglo-American Cable Company had a monopoly on transatlantic telegraphy from Newfoundland, so he planned to move to a new location in the United States. When Mulock learned this, he immediately negotiated an agreement with Marconi for him to set up his North American radio station in Glace Bay, Nova Scotia, where the first transatlantic message from North America was sent on 17 December 1902.

Mulock was Canada's representative at the opening of Australia's first Parliament in 1901, and was one of Canadian representatives at the coronation of King Edward VII. Mulock was knighted in 1902 for his services, in particular for the Penny Post, Transpacific Cable, and wireless telegraphy between Canada and Great Britain.

In order to protect the public against quackery Mulock amended the Post Office Act in 1904 to curtail advertising of "marvellous, extravagant or grossly improbable cures". Mulock was also active in the negotiations that led to the formation of the provinces of Alberta and Saskatchewan in 1905.

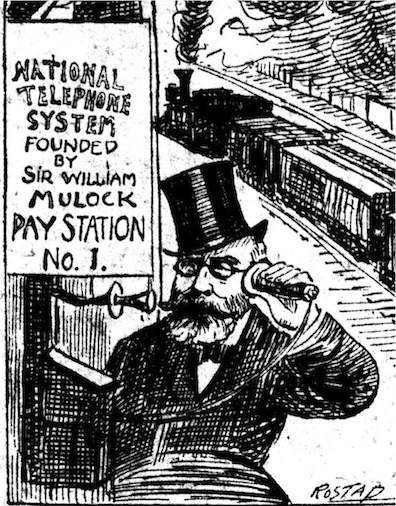
Mulock advocated public ownership of the telephone system. (Toronto Telegram, 24 October 1905)

In 1905, Mulock chaired the select parliamentary inquiry into telephone systems, especially the unregulated Bell Telephone monopoly. The committee shed much light on the operations and finances of Bell, but Mulock was replaced when it became apparent that he was likely to recommend the telephone service be a government owned utility. The committee's work nevertheless led in 1906 to the first federal regulation of telephone and telegram service by the Board of Railway Commissioners, the ancestor of the current Canadian Radio-television and Telecommunications Commission. Despite being a wealthy businessman and fervent anticommunist, Mulock believed that government operation of public franchises provided better service at lower cost, with greater protection of personal privacy and public interest.

Mulock was probably the best administrator in the Laurier Cabinet, but he did not always consider the political consequences of his actions. Without consulting Laurier, he fired the influential journalist Arthur Dansereau as Montreal's Postmaster. Mulock had ample cause, but Laurier immediately ordered Dansereau reinstated, straining Laurier's relationship with Mulock.

Mulock once let politics try to overrule physics. He proposed the Newmarket Canal to the centre of his riding to help local industry, despite engineering reports that that natural water flow would leave the canal dry for much of the year. "Mulock's Madness" was cancelled when Robert Borden became prime minister in 1911, but its partially completed remains are still prominent.

=== Minister of Labour (1900–1905) ===
While Postmaster-General, Mulock learned from Mackenzie King that Post Office uniforms were being produced in sweatshops. He immediately revised Post Office contracting policy so that all uniforms would be produced under government-approved conditions. In 1900, Mulock introduced "The Fair Wages Resolution" governing all Canadian government contracting, and an act that created the Department of Labour and the Labour Gazette (one of the ancestors of Statistics Canada). Mulock became Canada's first Minister of Labour in addition to his Post Office responsibilities. In response to an urgent telegram from Mulock, Mackenzie King turned down a better paid academic position at Harvard to become editor of the Labour Gazette and subsequently the first Deputy Minister of Labour. King eventually became Canada's longest serving prime minister, and remained friends with Mulock for the rest of his life. In 1903 Mulock introduced compulsory arbitration to Canada through the Railway Disputes Act.

Mulock retired from politics in 1905 due to rheumatism and neuritis exacerbated by overwork, but the movement of his political views to the left may also have contributed to his decision. He was succeeded in his parliamentary seat of York North and his two cabinet portfolios by Allen Bristol Aylesworth, who was Canada's representative on the Alaska boundary dispute tribunal.

=== Chief Justice ===
Mulock was appointed Chief Justice of the Exchequer (1905–1923) and subsequently Chief Justice of Ontario (1923–1936). He served until age 93, probably a record for a Canadian court; lawyers referred to Mulock and his elderly colleagues as "murderers' row". As Chief Justice of Ontario, Mulock participated in many widely publicized cases, such as quashing the rape conviction from Louis-Mathias Auger's first trial in 1929.

On 28 February 1930, a Ku Klux Klan mob invaded the home of a mixed race couple in Oakville, Ontario. Several men were eventually convicted, but given only a small fine. On appeal, Mulock described the fine as a "travesty of justice", and replaced it with a three-month prison term. Mulock reported himself as an ardent abolitionist in his youth, and as a politician he actively campaigned in Black communities, but in his ruling Mulock denounced only mob law, not the underlying racial issues. This ruling marked the start of a significant decline in Klan activity in Canada.

In 1931, Tim Buck and seven other members of the Communist Party of Canada were convicted of seditious conspiracy and membership in an unlawful organization. The strongly anticommunist Mulock presided over the appeal of the convictions in 1932, and despite dismissing the conspiracy charge, upheld the other convictions and his lengthy written decision established the Communist Party as an unlawful organization, effectively banning it.

By modern standards, Mulock's judgements were not always free of apparent bias or conflicts of interest. In the long and very public case of Campbell v Hogg, he was close to all participants, and Elizabeth Campbell was so unhappy with his court's judgement that to overturn it she became the first woman to argue a case before the Privy Council.

== Business and community ==
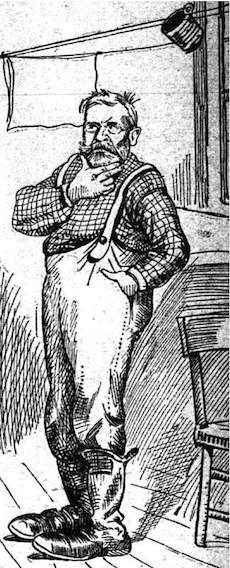
Mulock returns to his farm in 1905 (Toronto Telegram, 13 October 1905)

=== Farming ===
In 1880, Mulock purchased a large property on what is now the northwest corner of Mulock Drive and Yonge Street in Newmarket. On almost 400 acres (160 ha) Mulock established a manorial estate and model farm, known for its flowers, black walnut grove, apple orchard, and prize shorthorn cattle and Shetland ponies. In political life, Mulock was often referred to as "Farmer Bill". The farm was used to try out new methods and crops, and provided agricultural and leadership training for many students from the Ontario College of Agriculture. In 1926, Mulock purchased a second farm in Markdale, Ontario for trout fishing and reforestation.

=== Banking and commerce ===
Mulock's (and later his son's) firm represented many commercial interests, including Consumers Gas (Enbridge), the American Bank Note Company, and Sun Life. He was President of the Victoria Rolling Stock Company and the Farmers' Loan and Savings Co., and had real estate interests. In 1911, Mulock, Sir Henry Pellatt, and Charles Millar took control of O'Keefe Brewing, a brand now owned by Molson Coors Brewing Company.

Mulock was one of the founders of The Dominion Bank, which opened for business in 1871 and in 1955 merged with the Bank of Toronto to form the Toronto-Dominion Bank, Canada's second largest bank. He was also one of the founders (1882) and Directors of Toronto General Trusts, Canada's first trust company and an ancestor of TD Canada Trust.

In 1899, as chief Liberal Party organizer in Ontario, Mulock wanted a Liberal paper to counterbalance the Conservative Toronto Telegram. He led a group that purchased the ailing Toronto Star and offered Joseph Atkinson the position as editor. Atkinson accepted on the condition that he have editorial independence and that part of his pay would be in shares. Mulock unhappily agreed, and Mulock and Atkinson clashed for the rest of their lives. It gave Atkinson great pleasure at the 1913 annual shareholders' meeting to interrupt Mulock in mid-tirade to announce that he was now the majority shareholder and would do what he chose.

=== Community and philanthropy ===
Throughout his life, Mulock's strong interest in "plain people (and) public practical problems" involved him in leadership in innumerable community organizations. These included the CNIB, the Federation for Community Service (an ancestor of the United Way), St. John Ambulance, the Working Boys Home, and the Soldiers Rehabilitation Fund. Cardinal McQuigan credited Mulock with helping Catholics fully participate in the civic life of Ontario. In 1925, Mulock was the leading organizer of the Banting Research Foundation, Canada's first medical research foundation.

Despite playing a key role in forcing Laurier to commit Canadian forces in the Boer War, after his retirement from politics, Mulock spoke out against militarism. Mulock became the first president of Canada's first national, secular peace organization, the Canadian Peace and Arbitration Society, founded in 1905 by Charles Ambrose Zavitz. When Britain entered World War I, Mulock immediately started organizing the Toronto and York County Patriotic Fund (later part of the Canadian Patriotic Fund) to assist soldier's families. Mulock was President of the Toronto and York Fund for its entire existence (and chair of the Canadian executive); the Toronto fund raised $8,939,143, with only about 2% spent on expenses. At age 99 during World War II, he served as Chair of the Canadian Committee of the International YMCA, responsible for supervising enemy prisoners in Canada. He considered information from Canadian prison camp officials to be hearsay that could not replace direct inspection.

== Personal life and character ==
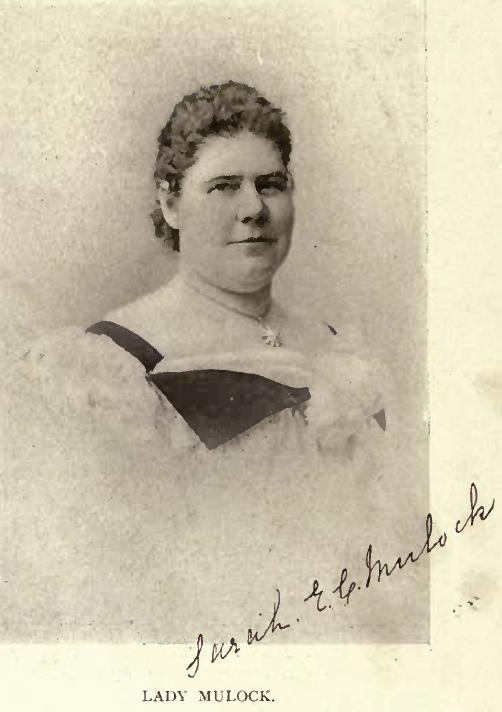
Lady Mulock

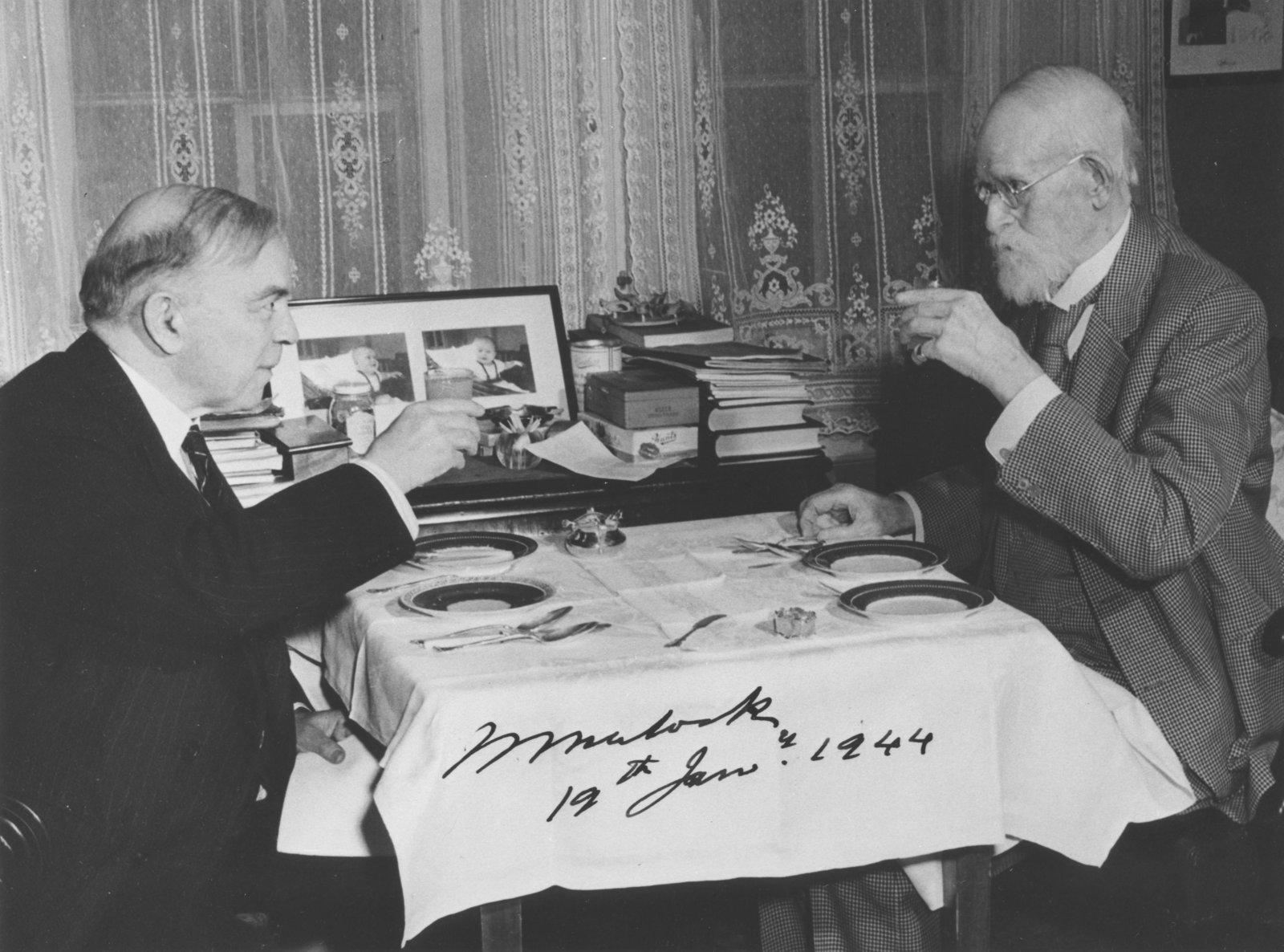
Prime Minister Mackenzie King and Sir William Mulock at breakfast on Mulock's 101st birthday

William Mulock married in May 1870 Sarah Ellen Crowther, daughter of James Crowther. She was born and educated in Toronto. The couple lived at 518 Jarvis Street in Toronto. The couple had six children (William, Edith, Sarah, Ethel, James, Cawthra). Mulock's grandson William Pate Mulock was also an MP for York North.

Mulock's use of profanity was said to be the most picturesque in parliament, and he was known for his consumption of Cuban cigars and rye whisky. Just before Prohibition came into force in Ontario in 1916, he had special concrete compartments built in his house into which he stored a lifetime supply of whisky.

Mulock was described as "The man who did", his work ethic recognized even by those who sometimes disagreed with what he did. Sir Daniel Wilson referred to him as "the mule". At a luncheon in his honour shortly after his 87th birthday, Mulock described his attitude on growing old:

I'm still at work with my hand to the plough and my face to the future. The shadows of evening … lengthen about me but morning is in my heart. … the testimony I bear is this: that the castle of enchantment is not yet behind me, it is before me still and daily I catch glimpses of its battlements and towers. The best of life is always further on. The real lure is hidden from our eyes, somewhere behind the hills of time.

Mulock is buried in Newmarket Cemetery. Named is his honour in Ontario are:

- Sir William Mulock Secondary School and Mulock Drive (York Regional Road 74) in the town of Newmarket;
- Mulock Drive in his birthplace, the town of Bond Head;
- the dispersed rural communities of Mulock in Grey County and Mulock in Nipissing District, and geographic Mulock Township in Nipissing District;
- Mulock Island in the North Channel, Lake Huron, in Algoma District;
- Mulock Creek, a tributary of the Barron River (Ontario), in Nipissing District; and
- Little Mulock Lake in Nipissing District.

== Electoral record ==
1882 Canadian federal election: York North
Party	Candidate	Votes
Liberal	William Mulock	1,830
Independent	Jas. Anderson	1,721

1887 Canadian federal election: York North
Party	Candidate	Votes
Liberal	William Mulock	2,526
Conservative	Richard Tyrwhitt	2,231

1891 Canadian federal election: York North
Party	Candidate	Votes
Liberal	William Mulock	2,331
Conservative	W. W. Pegg	1,968

1896 Canadian federal election: York North
Party	Candidate	Votes
Liberal	William Mulock	2,712
Conservative	P. W. Strange	2,036

By-election on 30 July 1896 On Mr. Mulock being appointed Postmaster General
Party	Candidate	Votes
Liberal	William Mulock	acclaimed

1900 Canadian federal election: York North
Party	Candidate	Votes
Liberal	William Mulock	2,007
Conservative	John Currey	1,710

1904 Canadian federal election: York North
Party	Candidate	Votes
Liberal	William Mulock	2,650
Conservative	Francis J. Roach	1,688

== Notes ==
Government offices
Preceded by William Donald Ross	Lieutenant Governor of Ontario (acting); 1931–1932	Succeeded by Herbert Alexander Bruce
Academic offices
Preceded by Byron Edmund Walker	Chancellor of the University of Toronto; 1924–1944	Succeeded by Henry John Cody
