= York North =

Former federal electoral district in Ontario, Canada

Ontario electoral district
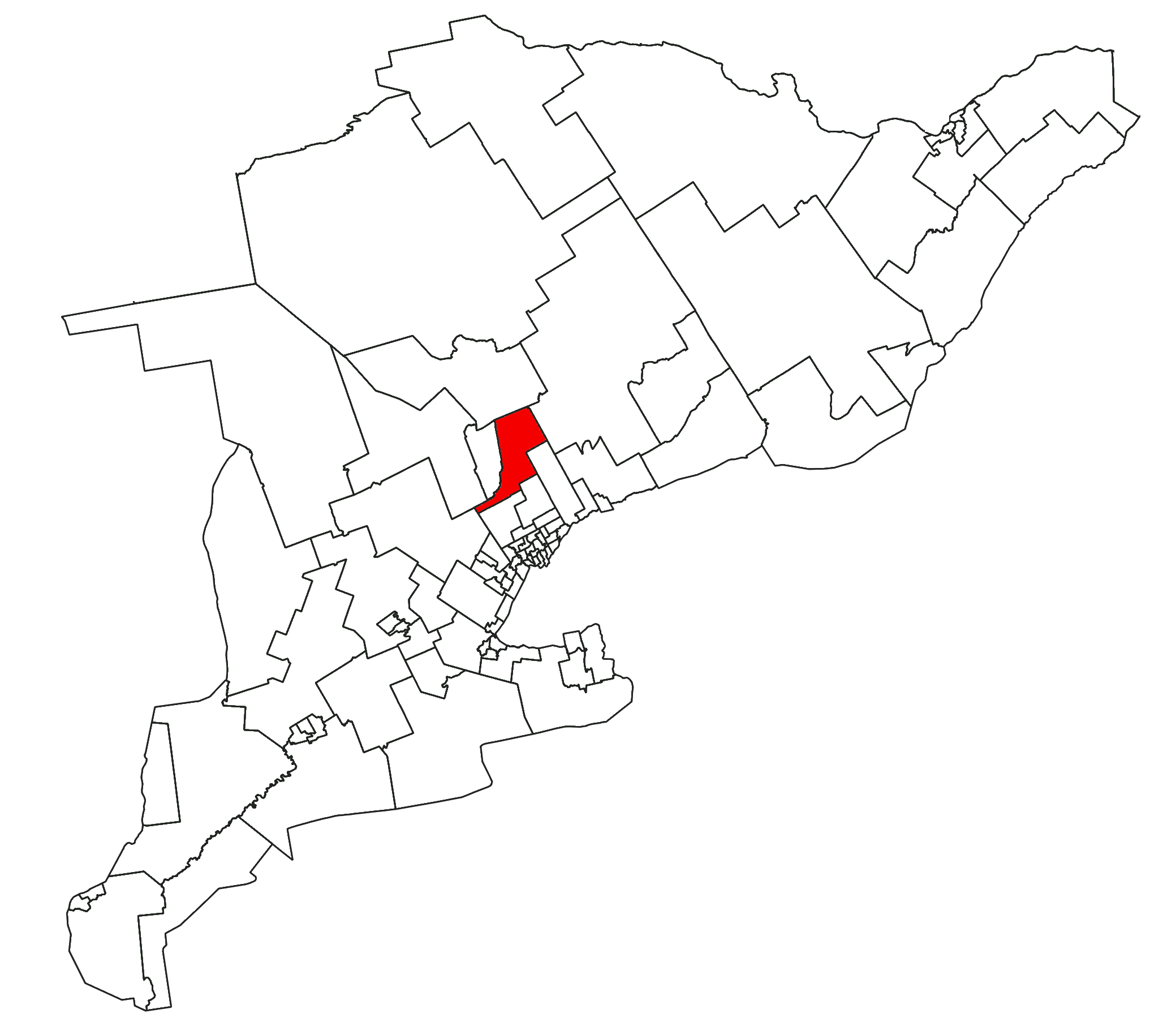
- York North in relation to other Southern Ontario electoral districts (1996 boundaries)

Defunct federal electoral district
- Legislature: House of Commons
- District created: 1867
- District abolished: 2003
- First contested: 1867
- Last contested: 2000

Demographics
- Population (2001): 132,038
- Electors (2002): 85,329
- Area (km²): 781
- Census subdivision(s): East Gwillimbury, Georgina, Newmarket, King

York North was a federal riding in Ontario, Canada, represented in the House of Commons of Canada in all thirty-seven parliaments from Confederation in 1867 until 2004. Its elimination in 2004 left Simcoe North as the only federal electoral district in Ontario to have been in continual existence since Canadian Confederation. Remarkably, York North's provincial counterpart similarly maintained continuous representation in the Legislative Assembly of Ontario in all thirty-eight Ontario parliaments between Confederation and 2007, and was the only provincial district to have maintained its continual existence after 1999.

York North was abolished by the 2003 redistribution process, and ceased to be in existence upon the dissolution of the 37th Parliament in May 2004. Its territory was redistributed to the new ridings of Newmarket—Aurora, Oak Ridges—Markham (only a small portion), and to the resurrected York—Simcoe (the vast rural portion), the riding previously replaced by York North in 1996. Its provincial counterpart was similarly abolished upon the dissolution of the 38th Ontario Parliament in June 2007.

The electoral district held a unique distinction for having two candidates from a single election declared elected, seated in parliament and unseated by court ruling before the term was over. Prior to the Supreme Court of Canada's February 2026 decision that invalidated the 1-vote election victory in Terreborne in the 2025 federal election, the ordeal stemming from York North's election in 1988 was the most recent federal contest to have been overturned for reasons other than a recount.

It was also among a small group of electoral districts that had been represented by a sitting prime minister, and even more still it is among just a small handful that had dealt its prime ministerial MP a local defeat.

While its final incarnation consisted mostly of the more rural area that lied actually in the northern portion of York Region, York North covered an collection of communities in the southern end of the region that are now commonly considered northern suburbs of the city of Toronto through much of the later half of the twenty century, such as Vaughan, Richmond Hill, Woodbridge, Stouffville and Markham. Its territory even reached into the modern City of Toronto for two periods, with a portion of the former township of North York being part of the riding in four general elections.

== Evolution of the riding ==
At Canadian Confederation, the British North America Act, 1867 specified the eight-two electoral districts to be contested for electing the first group of legislator to both the House of Commons and the provincial legislature. By virtue of the size of its population, the County of York was allocated three seats, one of four counties to have the right to elected three members. Its original boundary was however not defined by the BNA, which simply prescribed that the County of York 's three existing electoral districts from the pre-confederation colonial legislature, the Legislative Assembly of the Province of Canada, would continue. The three York electoral districts were previously defined in 1853 (which actually removed one of York's four ridings to create the new district of Peel), with York North covering the Township of King, Whitchurch, Georgina, East Gwillimbury and North Gwillimbury and the associated villages of Aurora, Newmarket and Holland Landing. It was were represented in the fifth to the eighth parliaments of the Province of Canada.

The County of York, and its successor York Region, as the entity initially surrounding and later abutting the fast growing City of Toronto, had over the years saw both its jurisdictional boundary and the electoral boundary of its districts shift in response to the rapid growth of population in Toronto and its surrounding suburbs. Many of the changes could also be attributed to the many piecemeal annexations by not just the City of Toronto but other municipal entities as they grew from villages into major population centres, though they do not explain all the wild fluctuation of its boundary or explain why "North" was used to describe its territory in some period. Except for once instances, it have however kept its territory north of what is now the City of Toronto.

In 1882, the riding was redefined to consist of the townships of King, East Gwillimbury, West Gwillimbury, North Gwillimbury and Georgina, and the villages of Holland Landing, Bradford and Aurora.

In 1903, the north riding was redefined to consist of the townships of Georgina, East Gwillimbury, North Gwillimbury, King, and Whitchurch, the towns of Aurora and Newmarket, and the villages of Holland Landing, Stouffville and Sutton.

In 1924, York North was defined as consisting of all that part of the county of York north of the southerly boundary of the townships of Vaughan and Markham. This was the first instance the riding reach as far south as the northern border of modern-day Toronto (though the concept of Metropolitan Toronto did not emerge until after the war). The riding boundary continue to reach that far south west of Yonge, but receded back east of Yonge in 1933 as it Markham and Stouffville were given to York East.

In 1947, it was redefined to consist of that part of the county of York lying north of the line being the southerly boundary of the township of North York, Yonge Street and the southerly boundary of the township of Markham.

In 1952, it was defined as consisting of that part of the county of York lying north of Highway 7, excluding the town of Woodbridge.

In 1966, it was defined as consisting of a north-central section of the Borough of North York in Metropolitan Toronto, the Town of Richmond Hill, the Township of Markham excluding the Village of Stouffville, and part of the Township of Vaughan. Twelve years prior to this redistribution, with the creation of the Municipality of Metropolitan Toronto in 1954 area south of Steeles Ave ceased to be part of York County. Markham, Vaughan and Richmond Hill were accordingly the three southernmost municipalities in York County at this time, the electoral district name York North was thus highly misleading for the redistributed district. It was however available, as the northern portion of the Country were distributed to join the southern portion of Simcoe County to form York–Simcoe, while the names York Centre, South, West and East were all in use by electoral districts within Metropolitan Toronto. While objection to the inclusion of a slice of Toronto was raised by former cabinet minister Dick Bell, as part of his extensive critique of the report by the Ontario boundaries commission that year, no objection to the naming of "York North" for an electoral district covering southern York was recorded from either local MP John Addison or other MPs.

In 1976, it was redefined to consist of the Towns of Markham, Richmond Hill and Vaughan in the Regional Municipality of York. In 1987, it was redefined to consist of the towns of Aurora, Richmond Hill and Vaughan, and the southern part of the Township of King.

In the 1996 redistribution, the misnomer of York North as a district covering southern York Region was corrected in a most abrupt manner. Most of the incumbent district became Vaughan—King—Aurora, with substantial portions redistributed to the electoral districts Oak Ridges and Thornhill. With its territory distributed to three newly created district, the historic name "York North" was redeployed to its traditional role of covering the northern portion of York: Newmarket, East Gwillimbury, Georgina, as well as the part of King north of Side Road 18. While its new territory was much better suited for the name, the pre-redistributed and post-redistributed electoral districts of York North had virtually no overlap. The name was simply freed up and slapped onto territory it ceased covering thirty years prior.

This final reincarnation of York North was contested in two federal elections. The electoral district was abolished in 2003, with vast majority redistributed between the new electoral district of Newmarket—Aurora and the resurrected York—Simcoe, making up more than half of each, and a tiny remainder portion to Oak Ridges—Markham.

=== Two breaches into Toronto ===
Despite the word North in its name reinforcing its association with the more rural area in the northern portion of York Region near Lake Simcoe, the electoral district not only covered much of the southernmost portion of York Region for extended periods, but had actually reach into the areas within the provincial capital's modern day boundary on two occasions.

In 1947, the electoral district of York South was drastically reduced in size to cover a concentrated area consisted of the village of Forest Hill and the area later known as Weston and the Borough of York. The territory it shredded was transferred to its northern sibling York North, shifting York North's southern boundary to the southerly boundary of the township of North York west of Yonge Street. With the western half of the Township of North York now a constituent component, York North did not merely stray pass the border of modern Toronto and picked up a few small villages. Its reached deep into an area of rapid urbanization within Metropolitan Toronto. The resulting riding literally span from the old City of Toronto border (as it was then) all the way to Lake Simcoe. Even in its contemporary context, the southern shift was unusual, though not sufficiently so to be contentious, as it merely followed the precedent of its provincial counterpart. The electoral boundaries of the provincial electoral districts of York North and York South were redrawn in the same manner fourteen years earlier. The identically drawn provincial York North riding had held five general elections by that point and had elected MPPs from all three parties by the time the federal boundary shifted. The federal riding however only held one election, in 1949, with territory inside modern day Toronto. In 1952, a brand new district named York Centre was created, resulting in York North's southern boundary receding back north to Highway 7 ahead of the 1953 federal election. While York North would venture into Toronto again, this was the only instance for York North to be actually immediately adjacent to City of Toronto in its contemporary definition, touching the city's then border in the area that was once the town of North Toronto.

It did not take long before York North reach into modern Toronto again. In 1966, York North took in the Newtonbrook neighborhood of North York, an area immediately south of Markham and fair distance from the actual city. It was designated for development of housing for the accommodation of decommissioned soldiers after the war. It the same redistribution, York North lost all of its northern territory around Lake Simcoe and was left with Markham, Richmond Hill and Vaughan, ironically the three southernmost towns in York Region after North York became part of Metropolitan Toronto. York North was contested three times in this incarnation.

=== A rare BNA original ===
Despite the wild fluctuation of its territory both federally and provincially, York North was the only electoral district prescribed by the BNA Act that had maintained presence without interruption both federally and provincial for such an extended period, respectively over thirty-seven and thirty-eight parliaments.

Before its elimination in the 2003 redistribution process, York North was represented in all thirty-seven Canadian parliaments from Canadian Confederation to 2004. York North and Simcoe North were the only federal electoral districts in Ontario to have maintained such continuous presence after 1988, when the federal electoral districts of Halton and Welland were eliminated after thirty three consecutive terms. Simcoe North continues to be represented today in the 45th Canadian Parliament, sharing the distinction as BNA defined district with four other: Beauce, Shefford and Sherbrooke in Quebec, and Halifax in Nova Scotia.

The rarity was particularly remarkable given the York North provincial electoral district had similarly maintained its continuous representation in the Legislative Assembly of Ontario in thirty-eight Ontario parliaments between Confederation and 2007. (Note: Strictly speaking, the provincial electoral district was renamed York–MacKenzie in 1993 by legislation enacted that applied to no other electoral district and effect no change to its boundary, essentially resulted in a cosmetic name change Representation Amendment Act, 1993 (No. 2). Statutes of the Province of Ontario. Vol. S.O.1993. 1993. c.30.. The district was contested only once with the name York–MacKenzie in the 1995 provincial election.) The provincial riding lost all four of its peers (Renfrew North, Carleton, York East, and Waterloo North) at the dissolution of the 36th Ontario Parliament in 1999 due to the enactment of the Fewer Politicians Act, 1996, through which all federal electoral boundary were adopted provincially.

York North's duo-maintenance of representation is unparalleled in Ontario. The closest examples would be:

- Welland - represented in 33 federal parliaments until 1988, and 30 Ontario parliaments until 1977
- Renfrew North - represented in 36 Ontario parliaments until 1999 and 28 federal parliaments until 1972

Only two electoral districts named in the BNA Act have maintained longer representation at both levels, both in Quebec:

- Shefford - extant in the current 45th Canadian Parliament, and represented in the Quebec National Assemblies for 39 terms until 2012
- Sherbrooke - extant in both the current 45th Canadian Parliament (the federal district was known as "Town of Sherbrooke in the first fourteen parliaments) and the current 43rd National Assembly of Quebec

== Notable contests and representatives ==
York North elected numerous high-profile members, both provincially and federally, both famous and infamous. It also had an unusual number of dramatic electoral events.

Six of the eleven Liberals MPs for the riding have served in cabinet, including Prime Minister William Lyon Mackenzie King, to whom voters of York North dealt defeat not once but twice, the second time while he was the sitting premier. The six MPs were:

- William Mulock - served in the first nine years of the Laurier ministry as Postmaster General and was credited for the creation of the federal Department of Labout; partially responsible for the presence of the next three names
- Allen Bristol Aylesworth - was the Canadian member of the three member Alaska Boundary Tribunal and was recruited to succeed Mulock both as MP and for his roles as Postmaster and labour minister, and later justice minister
- William Lyon Mackenzie King - Longest serving Prime Minister in Canadian history, entered public service as a civil servant initially at the urging of Mulock
- William Pate Mulock - grandson of the previous Mulock, and served in the cabinet of King
- Barney Danson - served as a junior minister for urban affairs and then defence minister in the Trudeau ministry
- Maurizio Bevilacqua - served as a secretary of state in the Chretien ministry

The six Conservative MPs, though all for have served while their party was in power, did not served in cabinet. The two core successor ridings York—Simcoe and Newmarket—Aurora, have each produced a prominent federal minister soon after replacing York North: Belinda Stronach in the Liberal Martin ministry and Peter Van Loan in the Conservative ministry.

York North did have one Conservative minister at the provincial level, Frank Klees in the Harris and Eves ministries, along with three Liberals: Elihu James Davis in the Mowat ministry, Charles Beer in the Peterson ministry, and Greg Sorbara who was in the Peterson and McGuinty ministries. More recently, the two successor provincial districts have each elected a former leadership rival of Premier Doug Ford, and both went on to serve senior roles in the Ford ministry: former Deputy Premier Christine Elliott, and former Treasury Board President Caroline Mulroney.

=== Campaigns with Toronto territory ===
York North's two seemingly unrelated Toronto incursions, into two separate areas of Toronto almost two decades apart, were connected through a campaign personnel decision. When the riding was contested in 1949 having gained a large swath of North York, incumbent Liberal MP Jack Smith took on the new challenge by entrusting his campaign to an urbane twenty-eight years old grew up in Parkdale in inner city Toronto named Barney Danson, a young man with considerable "campaign" experience having lost an eye in the Battle of Normandy. Smith won that contests with the largest margin of his three victories as MP of York North.

Two decades later former campaign manager Danson rose to carry the Liberal banner when York North again consisted of a piece of Toronto. He won all three elections contested in that configuration of the riding, and went on to serve as Minister of National Defence in the later 1970s.

=== Recount, controverted election, and a missing MP ===
The 1988 election was so hotly contested in York North that it led to the two leading candidates, Progressive Conservative Micheal O'Brien and Liberal Maurizio Bevilacqua, both being legally declared having been elected at different times, multiple recounts and an unprecedented two-year long legal battle with multiple court rulings. Both candidates served in parliament but one is omitted on the list below and also on the official list on the Parliament's website. Evidence of his brief service in the House of Commons could however be easily found by searching his name in Hansard.

The series of events was historically unique for a number of reasons:

- It was the only instance where an MP who had taken their seat in the House of Commons was ousted by a recount. (Note: While still very rare, MPs have been ousted for other reasons through contested elections. Recounts are usually completed soon after the election, long before winners would normally take their seats. In modern days, when an election is subject to a judicial recount, the returning officer is not to return the writ before the recount is completed.) Following the conclusion of the initial recount, O'Brien was declared elected, sworn into office, and participated in debates in the first sessions of the 34th Parliament.
- It was the only instance where two recounts were conducted for the same election and the result was changed after both recounts
- It was the only instance where two federal MPs were sworn in and served in the House of Commons following the same election in modern era, (Note: There were provincial precedents in the late 1800s, however.) and the only time that two members elected from the same contest were both unseated.
- It was the final instance where an MP was removed from office through the Dominion Controverted Elections Act before that legislation was repealed in 2000. Its provisions have been replaced by Part 20 of the Canada Elections Act.

== Members of Parliament ==
Parliament	Years	Member	Party
1st	1867–1872	James Pearson Wells	Liberal
2nd	1872–1874	Anson Dodge	Conservative
3rd	1874–1875	Alfred Hutchinson Dymond	Liberal
3rd	1875–1878	Alfred Hutchinson Dymond	Liberal
4th	1878–1882	Frederick William Strange	Liberal–Conservative
5th	1882–1887	William Mulock	Liberal
6th	1887–1891	William Mulock	Liberal
7th	1891–1896	William Mulock	Liberal
8th	1896–1896	William Mulock	Liberal
8th	1896–1900	William Mulock	Liberal
9th	1900–1904	William Mulock	Liberal
10th	1904–1905	William Mulock	Liberal
10th	1905–1908	Allen Bristol Aylesworth	Liberal
11th	1908–1911	Allen Bristol Aylesworth	Liberal
12th	1911–1917	John Alexander Macdonald Armstrong	Conservative
13th	1917–1921	John Alexander Macdonald Armstrong	Government (Unionist)
14th	1921–1921	William Lyon Mackenzie King	Liberal
14th	1922–1925	William Lyon Mackenzie King	Liberal
15th	1925–1926	Thomas Herbert Lennox	Conservative
16th	1926–1930	Thomas Herbert Lennox	Conservative
17th	1930–1934†	Thomas Herbert Lennox	Conservative
17th	1934–1935	William Pate Mulock	Liberal
18th	1935–1940	William Pate Mulock	Liberal
19th	1940–1945	William Pate Mulock	Liberal
20th	1945–1949	Jack Smith	Liberal
21st	1949–1953	Jack Smith	Liberal
22nd	1953–1957	Jack Smith	Liberal
23rd	1957–1958	Cecil Cathers	Progressive Conservative
24th	1958–1962	Cecil Cathers	Progressive Conservative
25th	1962–1963	John Hollings Addison	Liberal
26th	1963–1965	John Hollings Addison	Liberal
27th	1965–1968	John Hollings Addison	Liberal
28th	1968–1972	Barney Danson	Liberal
29th	1972–1974	Barney Danson	Liberal
30th	1974–1979	Barney Danson	Liberal
31st	1979–1980	John A. Gamble	Progressive Conservative
32nd	1980–1984	John A. Gamble	Progressive Conservative
33rd	1984–1988	Tony Roman	Independent
34th	1988–1990	Maurizio Bevilacqua	Liberal
34th	1990–1993	Maurizio Bevilacqua	Liberal
35th	1993–1997	Maurizio Bevilacqua	Liberal
36th	1997–2000	Karen Kraft Sloan	Liberal
37th	2000–2004	Karen Kraft Sloan	Liberal
Riding dissolved into York—Simcoe, Newmarket—Aurora, and Oak Ridges—Markham

== Election results ==
=== North Riding of the county of York ===
1867 Canadian federal election
Party	Candidate	Votes
Liberal	James Pearson Wells	acclaimed
Source: Canadian Elections Database

1872 Canadian federal election
Party	Candidate	Votes
Conservative	Anson Dodge	1,769
Independent	J Parnham	1,490
Source: Canadian Elections Database

1874 Canadian federal election
Party	Candidate	Votes
Liberal	Alfred Hutchinson Dymond	1,854
Independent	W.H. Thorne	1,516
Source: lop.parl.ca

1878 Canadian federal election
Party	Candidate	Votes
Conservative	Frederick William Strange	1,792
Liberal	Alfred Hutchinson Dymond	1,778

1882 Canadian federal election
Party	Candidate	Votes
Liberal	William Mulock	1,830
Independent	Jas. Anderson	1,721

1887 Canadian federal election
Party	Candidate	Votes
Liberal	William Mulock	2,526
Conservative	Richard Tyrwhitt	2,231

1891 Canadian federal election
Party	Candidate	Votes
Liberal	William Mulock	2,331
Conservative	W. W. Pegg	1,968

By-election on 29 June 1875 on Mr. Dymond being unseated on petition
Party	Candidate	Votes
Liberal	Alfred Hutchinson Dymond	1,684
Independent	Alfred Boultbee	1,316

1896 Canadian federal election
Party	Candidate	Votes
Liberal	William Mulock	2,712
Conservative	P. W. Strange	2,036

By-election on 30 July 1896 On Mr. Mulock being appointed Postmaster General
Party	Candidate	Votes
Liberal	William Mulock	acclaimed

1900 Canadian federal election
Party	Candidate	Votes
Liberal	William Mulock	2,007
Conservative	John Currey	1,710

1904 Canadian federal election
Party	Candidate	Votes
Liberal	William Mulock	2,650
Conservative	Francis J. Roach	1,688

By-election on 22 November 1905 On Mr. Mulock being appointed Judge
Party	Candidate	Votes
Liberal	Allen Bristol Aylesworth	2,729
Conservative	Arch. McCallum	2,235

1908 Canadian federal election
Party	Candidate	Votes
Liberal	Allen Bristol Aylesworth	2,856
Conservative	John Alexander Macdonald Armstrong	2,550

1911 Canadian federal election
Party	Candidate	Votes
Conservative	John Alexander Macdonald Armstrong	2,730
Liberal	Thomas Cowper Robinette	2,671

1917 Canadian federal election
Party	Candidate	Votes	%	Elected
Government (Unionist)	John Alexander Macdonald Armstrong	3,948	57.91	✓
Opposition (Laurier Liberals)	William Lyon Mackenzie King	2,870	42.09	
Total valid votes		6,818	100.00	
Source(s) "York North, Ontario (1867-08-06 - 2004-05-22)". History of Federal Ridings Since 1867. Library of Parliament.

1921 Canadian federal election
Party	Candidate	Votes	%	Elected
Liberal	William Lyon Mackenzie King	5,167	42.17	✓
Conservative	John Alexander Macdonald Armstrong	4,112	33.56	
Progressive	Ralph Waldo Emerson Burnaby	2,973	24.27	
Total valid votes		12,252	100.00	
Source(s) "York North, Ontario (1867-08-06 - 2004-05-22)". History of Federal Ridings Since 1867. Library of Parliament.

Canadian federal by-election, January 19, 1922 Federal Ministerial by-election for King's appointment as Prime Minister
Party	Candidate	Votes	Elected
Liberal	William Lyon Mackenzie King	acclaimed	✓
Total valid votes		-	-
Source(s) "York North, Ontario (1867-08-06 - 2004-05-22)". History of Federal Ridings Since 1867. Library of Parliament.

=== York North ===
1925 Canadian federal election
Party	Candidate	Votes	%	Elected
Conservative	Thomas Herbert Lennox	10,028	51.26	✓
Liberal	William Lyon Mackenzie King	9,534	48.74	
Total valid votes		19,562	100.00	
Source(s) "York North, Ontario (1867-08-06 - 2004-05-22)". History of Federal Ridings Since 1867. Library of Parliament.

1926 Canadian federal election
Party	Candidate	Votes
Conservative	Thomas Herbert Lennox	10,160
Liberal	Henry Arthur Sifton	9,860

1926 Canadian federal election
Party	Candidate	Votes
Conservative	Thomas Herbert Lennox	10,160
Liberal	Henry Arthur Sifton	9,860

1930 Canadian federal election
Party	Candidate	Votes
Progressive Conservative	Thomas Herbert Lennox	10,402
Liberal	William Pate Mulock	10,104
Source: lop.parl.ca

1930 Canadian federal election
Party	Candidate	Votes
Progressive Conservative	Thomas Herbert Lennox	10,402
Liberal	William Pate Mulock	10,104

By-election on 24 September 1934 On Mr. Lennox's death
Party	Candidate	Votes
Liberal	William Pate Mulock	11,480
Conservative	Harold A.C. Breuls	7,793

1935 Canadian federal election
Party	Candidate	Votes
Liberal	William Pate Mulock	9,638
Conservative	Harold A.C. Breuls	5,296
Reconstruction	George M. Dix	3,795
Co-operative Commonwealth	Kenneth Ross	1,124

1940 Canadian federal election
Party	Candidate	Votes
Liberal	William Pate Mulock	10,653
National Government	George M. Dix	8,829

1945 Canadian federal election
Party	Candidate	Votes
Liberal	Jack Smith	11,428
Progressive Conservative	Earl Toole	10,295
Co-operative Commonwealth	Archibald H. Woods	3,670

1949 Canadian federal election
Party	Candidate	Votes
Liberal	Jack Smith	18,933
Progressive Conservative	Arthur Walwyn	14,429
Co-operative Commonwealth	Arch Woods	5,736

1953 Canadian federal election
Party	Candidate	Votes
Liberal	Jack Smith	10,988
Progressive Conservative	Cecil Cathers	9,355
Co-operative Commonwealth	Donald Scott	2,116

1957 Canadian federal election
Party	Candidate	Votes
Progressive Conservative	Cecil Cathers	17,770
Liberal	Jack Rye	10,753
Social Credit	Allan A. Alton	1,653

1958 Canadian federal election
Party	Candidate	Votes
Progressive Conservative	Cecil Cathers	21,499
Liberal	Sam Cook	9,523
Co-operative Commonwealth	Fred Prentice	2,148
Social Credit	W. Dave Greer	494

1962 Canadian federal election
Party	Candidate	Votes
Liberal	John Addison	18,094
Progressive Conservative	C.A. Tiny Cathers	17,168
New Democratic	Stanley John Hall	7,796
Social Credit	J. Alex Ford	528

1963 Canadian federal election
Party	Candidate	Votes
Liberal	John Addison	21,668
Progressive Conservative	Charles Hooper	14,488
New Democratic	Stan Hall	8,591
Social Credit	John R. O'Brien	330

1965 Canadian federal election
Party	Candidate	Votes
Liberal	John Addison	18,207
Progressive Conservative	Donald R. Martyn	16,459
New Democratic	Jim Norton	10,438

1968 Canadian federal election
Party	Candidate	Votes
Liberal	Barney Danson	24,054
Progressive Conservative	Gord Hurlburt	15,693
New Democratic	Jack Grant	7,000

1972 Canadian federal election
Party	Candidate	Votes
Liberal	Barney Danson	28,123
Progressive Conservative	Stephen B. Roman	25,844
New Democratic	Jim Reid	11,065

1974 Canadian federal election
Party	Candidate	Votes
Liberal	Barney Danson	34,179
Progressive Conservative	Stephen Roman	26,386
New Democratic	Jim Reid	7,669
Social Credit	Victor Upeslacis	364

1979 Canadian federal election
Party	Candidate	Votes
Progressive Conservative	John A. Gamble	29,011
Liberal	Barney Danson	21,990
New Democratic	Bruce Searle	7,591
Libertarian	Dan Davidson	430
Independent	Neil Katzman	279
Marxist–Leninist	Paul Herman	37

1980 Canadian federal election
Party	Candidate	Votes
Progressive Conservative	John A. Gamble	26,039
Liberal	Jan Poot	24,281
New Democratic	Bruce Searle	8,933
Libertarian	Dan Davidson	538
Marxist–Leninist	Jamie Reid	55
lop.parl.ca

1984 Canadian federal election
Party	Candidate	Votes
Independent	Tony Roman	32,200
Progressive Conservative	John A. Gamble	27,955
Liberal	Aldo Tollis	18,034
New Democratic	Doris Schwar	10,077

1988 Canadian federal election
Party	Candidate	Votes
Liberal	Maurizio Bevilacqua	37,513
Progressive Conservative	Micheal O'Brien	37,436
New Democratic	Evelyn Buck	11,583
Libertarian	Chris Edwards	1,293

Canadian federal by-election, December 10, 1990 Bevilacqua's 1988 election declared void and invalid on July 6, 1990
Party	Candidate	Votes	%	±%
Liberal	Maurizio Bevilacqua	21,332	49.90%	
New Democratic	Peter Devita	14,321	33.50%	
Progressive Conservative	Micheal O'Brien	4,618	10.80%	
Christian Heritage	William Ubbens	1,399	3.27%	
Libertarian	Roma Kelembet	424	0.99%	
Independent	David M. Shelley	239	0.56%	
Independent	Adelchi Di Palma	163	0.38%	
Independent	Paul Wizman	156	0.36%	
Independent	John Turmel	97	0.23%	
Total valid votes		42,749	100.0	

1993 Canadian federal election
Party	Candidate	Votes	%	±%
Liberal	Maurizio Bevilacqua	71,223	63.22	
Reform	Heather Sinclair	20,135	17.87	
Progressive Conservative	Dario D'Angela	15,451	13.71	
New Democratic	Peter M.A. Devita	2,996	2.66	
National	Ben Kestein	1,271	1.13	
Libertarian	Robert Ede	913	0.81	
Natural Law	Wayne Foster	676	0.60	
Difference		51,088	45.35	
Turnout		112,665		

1997 Canadian federal election
Party	Candidate	Votes
Liberal	Karen Kraft Sloan	22,942
Reform	Shauneen MacKay	13,245
Progressive Conservative	John Cole	11,308
New Democratic	Laurie Cooke	1,996
Christian Heritage	Ian Knight	799
Canadian Action	JeweEl McKenzie	220
Natural Law	Mary Wan	187

2000 Canadian federal election
Party	Candidate	Votes
Liberal	Karen Kraft Sloan	22,665
Alliance	Bob Yaciuk	11,985
Progressive Conservative	Joe Wamback	11,890
New Democratic	Ian Scott	1,696
Independent	Ian Knight	509

== See also ==
- List of Canadian electoral districts
- Historical federal electoral districts of Canada

== Notes ==
Parliament of Canada
Preceded by Vacant, and prior Portage la Prairie; Arthur Meighen	Constituency represented by the prime minister William Lyon Mackenzie King; 1921-1925	Succeeded by Vacant, and later Prince Albert in 1926; William Lyon Mackenzie King
