= The Newmarket Era =

Weekly newspaper in Ontario, Canada

- Give Me The Liberty To Know, To Utter, And To Argue Freely, According To Conscience, Above All Other Liberty
- Type: Weekly newspaper
- Founder: G. S. Porter
- Founded: 1852
- Circulation: 42,319 as of September 2018
- ISSN: 1707-9195
- Website: www.yorkregion.com/newmarket-on/

The Newmarket Era is a weekly newspaper that has been published in Newmarket, Ontario, Canada, since 1852.

== History ==
The state is the servant, not the master, of the people; the state is their guarantee against infringement on their rights, their agent in international and national issues; it is not the function of the state to assume the direction of those activities which rest on individual choice.

— Newmarket editorial page

=== 1850s ===
The New Era began as a four-page weekly on February 5, 1852, under George S. Porter, born in 1813 and originally from Norwich, England. He controlled the paper for a year before heading to Australia where he lived into his 100th year. During his tenure the paper reprinted long tracts on topics of the day, but struggled to find a readership among the 500 members of the pre-incorporation village of Newmarket. This was attributed to a lack of money and the education potential of readers. He sold the paper to new arrivals from Toronto, Erastus Jackson and A. E. R. Henderson.

Erastus was born August 29, 1829, in Merrickville, Grenville County, son of tanner/shoemaker Christoper Stroud Jackson. Erastus' first apprenticeship in the paper trade was at 16 years of age, and from 1845 to 1852 worked at papers in Cobourg (Canadian Christian Advocate), Guelph (the Advertiser and Mercury), and in Toronto for the Hon. William McDougall’s Toronto North American. There he met partner A. E. R. Henderson with whom he arrived in Newmarket on June 20, 1853, though their partnership would only last a year leaving Jackson as sole proprietor of the paper for many hard years. The lack of public and grammar schools that had caused Porter to relinquish the paper did indeed affect Jackson as well, but perseverance would pay off. By the 1860s, paid subscribers for the re-named Newmarket Era totalled 1,200 when the town’s population was only 1,000. For a time the paper was known as the Era and North York General Intelligencer and Advertiser, having absorbed the Intelligencer in the 1860s.

A Methodist and Reformer, Jackson befriended Father of Confederation George Brown. He served on the party’s executive and stood as an Independent Reform candidate for the provincial assembly in 1875, campaigned for by Alexander Muir. Jackson occupied many positions during his life: coroner and issuer of marriage licenses during and after the Sandfield-Dorion administration of Old Canada, welcomed dignitaries such as the Prince of Wales in 1861 and Lord Dufferin, as a municipal councillor and reeve. He was an executive of the Canadian Press Association, president of Newmarket Mechanics’ Institute, Masonic member and mayor for two years after incorporation as town in 1880. Erastus even introduced newsboys to Newmarket when the Fenian Raid broke out in 1866 and an emergency edition was issued. Erastus would bring his son Lyman into the fold in 1883, and stayed involved with the paper until close to his death on January 6, 1919.

During Erastus' time the paper moved from its original location on the east side of Main Street by Park Avenue, then Mill (Queen), Ontario Street and finally atop a hill at 142 Main St.

=== 1900s ===
Lyman George Jackson, son of Sophia Wright and Erastus, would steward the paper from February 1883 until his death on August 8, 1934. From early 1931 to May 1932, he sold and subsequently bought back the paper from Arthur Hawkes and his daughter Evelyn Crickmore, as the Depression affected sales.

After L. G.'s passing Andrew Olding Hebb, a Nova Scotian who reported for papers in his home province as well as Quebec and Ontario, took over the paper until 1946. Four years prior, shoemaker and editor of the Conservative Newmarket Express Herald Angus West merged with the Era to form the Era and Express. Hebb becoming co-owner with former-Postmaster and Express publisher Col. William Pate Mulock, who was married to the Hon. Frederick Johnston's daughter Kathleen. John A. Meyer and John E. Struthers would succeed Hebb as editor. Meyer and Struthers would rack an impressive amount of awards during their time with the paper: Three Charles Clark trophies in the 1930s, a Pearce Trophy for Best Editorial Page in 1942, as well as Legge Memorial trophies and a David Williams trophy in the 1950s.

1950s Onward

On June 14, 1953, the Era’s offices were ravaged by a fire and a new location arranged at 30 Charles Street by publisher Cecil Alexander “Tiny” Cathers, a Progressive Conservative MP.

In 1958 Maj. James McCollum Baxter of Windsor would take over the paper, himself a former city editor of the Windsor Record in 1913. Like Jackson, Baxter's son Ian would eventually join the paper, but in 1965 the paper was sold to John Bassett and the Toronto Telegram, establishing Inland Publishing Ltd., which would eventually be purchased by Torstar, Inc. The paper absorbed the Newmarket Post in 1966.

The 1970s saw David R. Haskell as publisher, with Robert Terrence “Terry” Carter, who would write a fair bit about the history of the paper, as editor-in-chief. The paper moved to a larger premise on Steven Court in 1982. The paper merged with the Aurora Banner in 1989 to form the Era-Banner. The Era-Banner continues today under Metroland Media Group, with Ian Proudfoot publishing from 1996 to 2016 and Dana Robbins next. On September 15, 2023 Metroland Media moved the newspaper to an online only format.

Geographic Coverage

The paper historically served the communities of Newmarket, Ravenshoe, Holt, Aurora, Schomberg, Glenville, Pine Orchard, Sharon, Holland Landing, Roche's Point, Belhaven, Baldwin, Keswick, East Gwillimbury, Sutton, Queensville, Mount Zion, Mount Pisgah, Mount Albert and Kettleby.

== See also ==
- List of newspapers in Canada
