= Thomas Lennox =

Thomas Lennox may refer to:

- Tom Lennox, a character on the TV series 24
- Thomas Herbert Lennox (1869–1934), Ontario lawyer and political figure
