= Lynn From =

Canadian dermatologist (1938–2020)

Dr. Lynn From
- Born: November 6, 1938
- Died: April 19, 2020 (aged 81)
- Education: University of Toronto (M.D., 1963)
- Occupation: Physician

Lynn From (November 6, 1938 – April 19, 2020) was a Canadian physician who specialized in dermatology and skin pathology. From was the pathologist-in-chief at Toronto's Women's College Hospital from 1981 to 1992 and the head of dermatology from 1993 to 2000.

== Early life and education ==
From was born on November 6, 1938. She attended the University of Toronto Medical School, obtaining her MD in 1963. After her graduation she completed several residencies at Wellesley Hospital (1963–1964), St John’s Hospital for Diseases of the Skin in London, England (1964–1965) and Sunnybrook Hospital (1966). She then travelled to Massachusetts in 1967 to complete a one-year fellowship in dermatopathology at Harvard Medical School's largest teaching hospital, Massachusetts General Hospital. Following that she returned to Canada where she continued her medical training at Toronto General Hospital (1969–1970; 1971–1972) and Toronto Western Hospital (1970–1971).

== Career ==
After completing her training, From joined the University of Toronto's Faculty of Medicine as a lecturer in 1972 and was later appointed as an associate professor (Pathology and Medicine) in 1984. Also in 1972, Dr. From joined the medical staff of Sunnybrook Medical Centre, where she worked in the Division of Dermatology until 1981. Later that year she joined the staff of Women's College Hospital as its pathologist-in-chief. She remained in that position until 1992. In 1993, From became the head of dermatology at Women's College Hospital and established several programs including a Dermatology Laser Unit (1994), a Wound Care Clinic (1995), and an Alopecia Clinic (1996). While working at Women's College Hospital, she was also the National Director of the Sun Awareness program which was “sponsored by the Canadian Dermatology Association and supported by the Canadian Cancer Society.

Prior to her retirement in 2000, From was a member of the hospital's Board of Directors (1984–1989 and 1997–1999) as well as the hospital's foundation Board of Directors (1991–1993). During her career she won numerous research awards, published several books, as well as published her medical research in multiple journals including: The New England Journal of Medicine, Canadian Medical Association Journal, Journal of the American Academy of Dermatology. She was also on the editorial board of several journals including The American Journal of Dermatopathology, Pediatric Dermatology, Journal of Cutaneous Pathology.

== Retirement ==
From retired from her position as Head of Dermatology in 2000 and died on April 19, 2020.

== Awards, recognitions, and memberships ==
In 1971 From became a Fellow of the Royal College of Physicians and Surgeons of Canada, specializing in dermatology. One year later, she became a Fellow specializing in anatomical pathology. She also volunteered as a Chief Examiner for the Royal College from 1980 to 1982. In addition to her medical practice, From was a member of several associations including: The Academy of Medicine, the American Academy of Dermatology, the American Society of Dermatopathology, the Canadian Association of Pathologists, the Canadian Dermatological Association (where she was the president from 2000-2001), the Canadian Medial Association, the Toronto Dermatological Society and the Women’s Dermatological Society.

In 1990, she was awarded the J.B Walter Award for Teaching from the Department of Pathology in the University of Toronto’s Faculty of Medicine. She also received the Award of Merit from the Canadian Dermatology Association in 2006 “in recognition of her excellence in leadership, dermatology education, and public health”.
