= Don Scott (Ontario author) =

Canadian writer and teacher (1924–2011)

Donald W. Scott (May 19, 1924 – December 6, 2011) was a schoolteacher, writer and sometime political candidate based in Sudbury, Ontario, Canada. He was a graduate of the University of Toronto, held a Master of Science degree from Guelph University, and was self-educated in the field of degenerative diseases. Scott was a candidate for both the New Democratic Party and the Canadian Action Party, and formed a short-lived party called Ontario Options in the mid-1990s.

== Early life and career ==
Scott was born in Wiarton, Ontario. He joined the Royal Canadian Navy on July 15, 1941 and served in the Pacific and North Atlantic during World War II, including a stint on HMCS Ontario. He wrote a guest piece on his experiences for the Toronto Star newspaper in 1997, and wrote similar pieces for the Sudbury Star. In 1948, he was discharged with the rank of Petty Officer.

He worked as a teacher after leaving the military, and was a commissioner of the Ontario Teachers' Pension Fund from 1971 to 1976. He criticized the Ontario Secondary School Teachers Federation's retirement scheme in 1979, arguing that senior staff members were receiving "immoral" increases via dubious means. In 1984, he promoted a series of retirement villages for teachers throughout Ontario.

== Medical work ==
In 1995, Scott assisted a Sudbury woman in her successful battle to have chronic fatigue syndrome officially recognized as a debilitating disease. He developed a personal interest in the subject, and conducted private research on degenerative diseases from 1995 to 1999. In 1995, he and his son William wrote a book entitled The Extremely Unfortunate Skull Valley Incident, examining an American test of nerve gas in the Skull Valley area that caused the death of thousands of sheep. The Scotts wrote a follow-up book called The Brucellosis Triangle in 1997, hypothesizing a link between CFS and brucella bacteria. Scott frequently argued that CFS and related conditions should be recognized as legitimate illnesses, and rejected the view that they are "learned behaviour designed to help the patient avoid facing life".

Scott founded the Common Cause Medical Research Foundation in 1998, seeking to draw together researchers working in the field of degenerative diseases. In July 1999, he introduced a quarterly publication called The Journal of Degenerative Diseases. The journal was published by The Sudbury Star, and edited by Scott himself. He launched another new publication in 2003, with the title able.

Scott hypothesized that mycoplasma (crystalline elements of dead bacteria cells) may remain dormant in human bodies and become reinvigorated as the result of traumatic events, thereby robbing other cells of ammonia. This process, he argued, is the cause of many degenerative disorders. Dr. Garth Nicolson of the Institute of Molecular Medicine in California has described Scott's research as "mind-boggling", and convinced him to become an adjunct professor at the institution. Scott's writings were also very critical of the American military establishment and its biological warfare experiments, which he blamed for the spread of many diseases. In 2004 and 2005, he focused his attention on Alzheimer's disease and proposed a clinical trial to reverse some effects of the illness.

In a 2001 interview with The Sudbury Star, Scott said that he was able to bring forward unconventional medical theories because he was self-taught, and "not predisposed to think in a way that someone taught me to think". This piece also described his writings as "thorough and highly engaging."

== Politics ==
Scott entered political life as a member of the Cooperative Commonwealth Federation (CCF), and ran for the party in the 1953 federal election. He finished third against Liberal incumbent Jack Smith in the riding of York North.

The CCF was restructured as the New Democratic Party in 1960-61. Scott remained active with the new party, and ran under its banner in the 1967 provincial election and the 1974 federal election. He finished second on both occasions, the first time to Progressive Conservative Gaston Demers in Nickel Belt, and the second time to Liberal James Jerome in Sudbury.

He became disillusioned with the NDP during the government of Bob Rae (1990–95), and started his own political party called Ontario Options on June 10, 1994. According to a Montreal Gazette report, the party proposed that Canada be divided into five countries: Quebec, Ontario, an Atlantic provinces federation to be called "Atlantis", a Prairie federation to be called "Alsatoba", and a union of British Columbia, Yukon and the Northwest Territories to be called "Columbia". Scott was the party's only member at the time of its registration, and ran under its banner in the 1995 provincial election. As it was not recognized as an official party by Elections Ontario, he appeared on the ballot as an independent. He received 506 votes (1.67%), finishing a distant fourth against Liberal candidate Rick Bartolucci in Sudbury. Scott was still listed as president of the Ontario Options Party in December 2000, when he wrote a letter opposing the amalgamation of Greater Sudbury.

Scott later affiliated with Paul Hellyer's Canadian Action Party at the federal level, and ran for the party in the 1997 federal election. He finished fifth against Liberal incumbent Ray Bonin in Nickel Belt. Scott was chairman of the Canadian Action Party's northern caucus in the 2000 federal election. He said that the party's main goal was "to protect Canada from the growing Americanization of our nation".

Shortly before the 2003 provincial election, Scott wrote a public letter calling on all former New Democrats to return to the party. He wrote that the Rae government had "largely ignored [its promises] about public auto insurance and other social issues", but also argued that the party had moved on since then, and described Rae's successor Howard Hampton as "reasoned, honest [and] intelligent".

1953 Canadian federal election: York North
Party	Candidate	Votes
Liberal	Jack Smith	10,988
Progressive Conservative	Cecil Cathers	9,355
Co-operative Commonwealth	Donald Scott	2,116

== Other ==
Scott played a significant role in organizing a symposium on John F. Kennedy in Sudbury in 1993. He helped organize Health Awareness Week in 2000, to support Canada's health-care system and educate at-risk groups about disease concerns.

Shortly after the September 11, 2001 attacks, he wrote a letter to The Sudbury Star criticizing the paper for running an editorial cartoon that he described as "sick, prejudiced, racist [and] unfeeling". In the same letter, he supported the rights of the Palestinian people.
