= Anson Dodge =

Canadian politician

Member of the Canadian Parliament for York North
- In office 1872–1874
- Preceded by: James Pearson Wells
- Succeeded by: Alfred Dymond

Personal details
- Born: August 25, 1834 New York City, New York, U.S.
- Died: May 28, 1918 (aged 83) Chicago, Illinois, U.S.
- Party: Conservative

Anson Greene Phelps Dodge (August 25, 1834 – May 28, 1918) was an American-Canadian lumber dealer and political figure. He represented York North in the House of Commons of Canada from 1872 to 1874 as a member of the Conservative Party.

He was born in New York City, the son of William E. Dodge and Melissa Phelps, and educated in England. He married Rebecca Wainwright Grew (1836–1925) in 1859. In 1872, he was naturalized by an act of parliament. Dodge established lumber mills on Georgian Bay.

Following a variety of occupations, Anson Dodge began his own lumber career in 1864 at Williamsport, Pennsylvania. First attracted to the forests of Ontario in 1866, with an invitation from Henry W. Sage, possibly at a time when Sage was considering disposing of his Bell Ewart mill. After a tour of the facilities at Bell Ewart, Anson continued his trek northward to Oakley township in Muskoka where Sage had recently acquired timber berths. Anson also purchased timber in the township and a small mill on Lake Simcoe at Atherly, near Orillia. Dodge continued his spending spree, purchasing timber berths and mills with various partners, establishing his Georgian Bay Lumber Company in 1869, with a new mill at Byng Inlet.

At Parry Sound, he was one of John Classon Miller's partners in the establishment of the Parry Sound Lumber Company in 1872. Dodge's rapid expansion into the Canadian lumber trade left him financially exposed. When the Panic of 1873 hit he was unable to survive and was declared bankrupt. Anson's share of the Parry Sound firm was sold to J C Miller in 1877.

== Election to Canadian Parliament ==
Agreement was reached with several of Dodge's Canadian associates that he should run for election as a member of the Canadian Parliament for the constituency of York North, Ontario. This was the location where he was known and respected by the locals. One of the major obstacles in his way was that he was an American citizen, and had not been resident in Canada long enough to qualify for naturalisation. To overcome this an act of Parliament was required, and this was passed in June 1872 allowing Anson Dodge to naturalise. Having qualified almost at the last minute, Dodge went on to win the seat at the general election, held between July and October 1872. However, a letter from a clergyman in New Jersey, published by Dodge to provide a character reference, proved to be fake and became a source of embarrassment to him after the election. Although he survived this scandal, his time in Parliament was short lived as a new election was held on 22 January 1874 and he did not stand. He returned to the United States to manage family lumber interests in Georgia.

== Georgia lumber ==
Anson's father, William Earle Dodge Sr. had been involved with the lumber business for nearly forty years. He started to acquire large tracts of timber land in Pennsylvania for Phelps, Dodge, & Co in the 1830s. He was a partner in this with his father-in-law Anson Green Phelps, and brother-in-law Daniel James. Later he began to invest his own money in the procurement of forested land and often entrusted the management to his sons Norman, George, Arthur and Anson. William was a cautious business man (unlike Anson) and he knew the risks involved with the production and sale of lumber. An example of this was where he took the known costs and returns for a particular stand of timber and extrapolated it to a larger scale whilst adding safety margins:

For fear of errors, deduct one half; to be very careful, deduct one half again; in these days of speculation we will once more deduct one half; as everything appears to be going to the bottom, we will another time deduct a half; on account of the destruction of the United States Bank we will go another half. Half of this final amount will be the share of Phelps, Dodge, & Co. Now deduct the original cost, and the remainder will be profit.

After the American Civil War, William Dodge with partners started to buy thousands of acres of timbered land in Georgia. One estimate put the size of this holding at 300,000 acres. He built infrastructure, including saw mills at St Simon's Island. Anson was put in charge of the business called The Georgia Land and Lumber Company. Legislative changes introduced in 1877, that would have forced the company to incorporate in the state of Georgia, were circumvented by transferring ownership of the business to one of William's other sons, George Egleston Dodge (1849-1904).

After about six years in Georgia Anson moved on; he was said to have set up a logging venture in Minnesota with a former colleague, but records are elusive. He later retired to Danville, Illinois where he was known as General A G P Dodge. He built a mansion but this burnt down soon after completion during a party being given for an estimated 200 guests.

== Family ==
Family Tree of Anson Greene Phelps Dodge

David Low Dodge (1774-1852)	Married; 1798	Sarah Cleveland (1780-1862)	Anson Green Phelps (1781-1853)	Married; 1806	Olivia Egleston (1784-1859)
William Earl Dodge (1805-1883)	Married; 1828	Melissa Phelps (1809-1903)
William E. Dodge Jr. (1832-1903) m.1854 Sarah Hoadley (1832-1909)	Anson Greene Phelps Dodge (1834-1918) m(1).1859 Rebecca Grew (1836-1927) m(2).1886 Rachel Rose Voorhees (1852-1910)	David Stuart Dodge (1836-1921) m(1).1860 Ellen Ada Phelps (1838-1880) m(2).1885 Elizabeth Scott Boyd (1846-1888)	Charles Cleveland Dodge (1841-1910) m.1863 Maria Theresa; Bradhurst Schieffelin (1840-1910)	Norman White Dodge (1846-1907) m(1).1869 Grace Gillette (1848-1870) m(2).1880 Emma Hartley (1849-1881) m(3).1897 Grace Vernon (1870-1953)	George Eglestone; Dodge (1849-1904) m.1874 May Cossitt (1853-1911)	Arthur Murray Dodge (1852-1896) m.1875 Josephine Jewell (1855-1928)

Dodge's marriage to Rebecca Drew ended in divorce in about 1883 and he remarried in 1886 to Rose Voorhees (1853-1910). There was one child from each marriage, Anson Jr. and Julia Voorhees Dodge (1892-1931). Dodge died in Illinois in 1918.

== Anson Greene Phelps Dodge Jr. ==
In 1878 Dodge's eighteen-year-old son, Anson Jr.(1860-1898), eloped with his sixteen year old cousin, Ellen Ada Dodge (daughter of Reverend David Stuart Dodge) The parents gave chase and the incident was reported widely in both the national and international newspapers; eventually they were located in Washington where they were attempting to get a marriage license. They were separated, but permitted to marry two years later in London. Ellen Ada died in 1883 whilst visiting India with her husband. Her body was returned to the United States and buried in the church on St Simon's Island, Georgia. Anson was ordained after studying at the General Theological Seminary, New York, and returned to St Simon's Island where he became the rector at this same church.

== Legacy ==
Dodge owned property in Roches Point, Ontario, called Lakehurst Gardens, which was designed by Frederick Law Olmsted. Merged with the Beechcroft estate, it became Beechcroft and Lakehurst National Historic Site in 1978.

== Electoral record ==
1872 Canadian federal election: York North/York-Nord
Party	Candidate	Votes
Conservative	Anson Dodge	1,769
Independent	J Parnham	1,490
Source: Canadian Elections Database
