= Mulock Cup =

Canadian rugby trophy

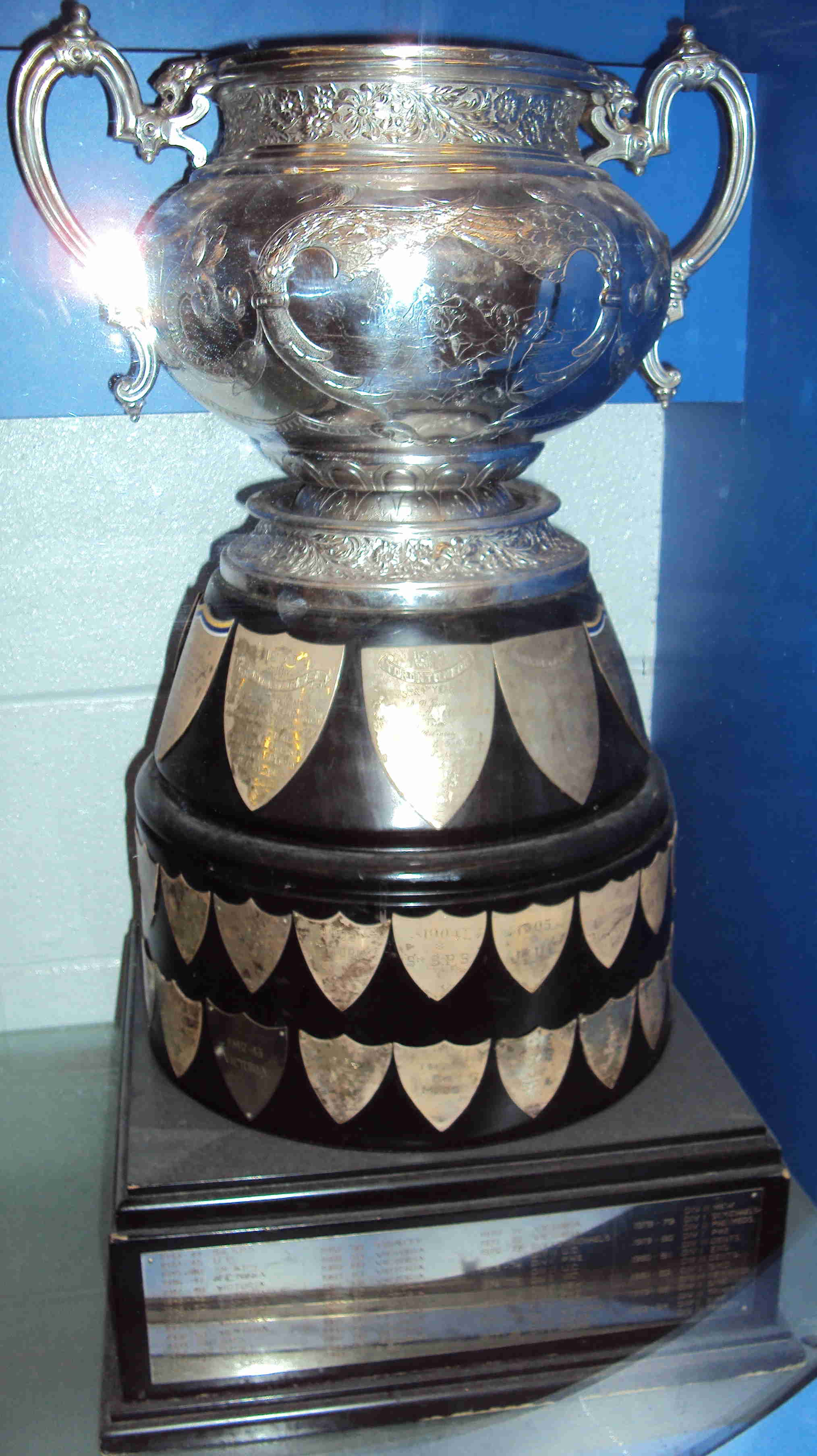
Mulock cup

The Mulock Cup is Canada's oldest continuously awarded sporting trophy. Since 1894, it has been awarded at the University of Toronto to the winner of the Intramural/intercollege rugby, then football (originally termed Rugby-Football) champion but it is now again awarded to the rugby champion. It was instituted by William Mulock.
