= William Pate Mulock =

Canadian politician

The Hon. William Pate Mulock
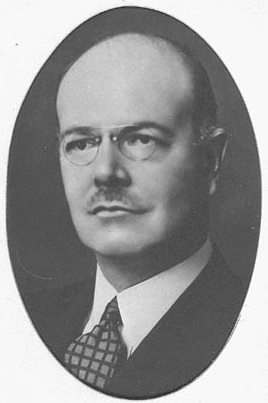

Member of the Canadian Parliament for York North
- In office 1934–1945
- Preceded by: Thomas Herbert Lennox
- Succeeded by: Jack Smith

Personal details
- Born: July 8, 1897 Toronto, Ontario, Canada
- Died: August 25, 1954 (aged 57) near Newmarket, Ontario
- Resting place: Mount Pleasant Cemetery, Toronto
- Party: Liberal
- Spouse(s): Kathleen Eleanor Johnston of Sault Ste Marie, Ontario and Toronto.
- Relations: William Mulock, grandfather
- Children: William Johnston Mulock and Thomas Homan Mulock
- Cabinet: Postmaster General (1940-1945)

William Pate Mulock, PC (July 8, 1897 – August 25, 1954) was a Canadian politician.

== Biography ==
William Pate Mulock was born in Toronto, Ontario, Canada, to William Mulock and Ethel Pate.

Mulock was educated at Upper Canada College and the University of Toronto, where he was a member of Kappa Alpha Society. Following service in the Canadian Expeditionary Force in Siberia, he returned and attended Osgoode Hall Law School.

Mulock first ran unsuccessfully for the House of Commons of Canada in the riding of York North in the 1930 federal election. He was elected in a 1934 by-election and re-elected in 1935 and 1940. A Liberal, he was the Postmaster General from 1940 to 1945.

Upon the death of the founding publisher of the Toronto Star in 1948, Mulock inherited some of the estate of the late Joseph E. Atkinson. Mulock was the grandson of Sir William Mulock.

By-election on 24 September 1934 On Mr. Lennox's death
Party	Candidate	Votes
Liberal	William Pate Mulock	11,480
Conservative	Harold A.C. Breuls	7,793

1935 Canadian federal election: York North
Party	Candidate	Votes
Liberal	William Pate Mulock	9,638
Conservative	Harold A.C. Breuls	5,296
Reconstruction	George M. Dix	3,795
Co-operative Commonwealth	Kenneth Ross	1,124

1940 Canadian federal election: York North
Party	Candidate	Votes
Liberal	William Pate Mulock	10,653
National Government	George M. Dix	8,829
