= Jack Smith (politician) =

Canadian politician

Member of Parliament for York North
- In office June 1945 – April 1957

Personal details
- Born: John Eachern Smith; 6 August 1901 Eldon Township, Ontario, Canada
- Died: 28 April 1967 (aged 65)
- Party: Liberal
- Spouse(s): Gertrude H. M. Vickery (m. 30 April 1925)
- Profession: newspaper editor and publisher

John Eachern Smith (6 August 1901 – 28 April 1967) was a Liberal party member of the House of Commons of Canada. He was born in Eldon Township, Ontario and was in the newspaper business as an editor and publisher.

He was first elected to Parliament at the York North riding in the 1945 general election then re-elected in 1949 and 1953. Smith left the House of Commons after his third term, the 22nd Canadian Parliament, and did not seek re-election in 1957.

One of Smith's campaign managers in the 1949 election was Barney Danson, who later became a cabinet minister.

1945 Canadian federal election: York North
Party	Candidate	Votes
Liberal	Jack Smith	11,428
Progressive Conservative	Earl Toole	10,295
Co-operative Commonwealth	Archibald H. Woods	3,670

1949 Canadian federal election: York North
Party	Candidate	Votes
Liberal	Jack Smith	18,933
Progressive Conservative	Arthur Walwyn	14,429
Co-operative Commonwealth	Arch Woods	5,736

1953 Canadian federal election: York North
Party	Candidate	Votes
Liberal	Jack Smith	10,988
Progressive Conservative	Cecil Cathers	9,355
Co-operative Commonwealth	Donald Scott	2,116
