= James Pearson Wells =

Canadian politician

Member of the Canadian Parliament for York North
- In office 1867–1872
- Succeeded by: Anson Dodge

Personal details
- Born: January 13, 1822 Aurora, Upper Canada
- Died: August 24, 1893 (aged 71) Aurora, Ontario
- Party: Liberal

James Pearson Wells (January 11, 1822 – August 24, 1893) was an Ontario farmer and political figure. He represented York North in the 1st Canadian Parliament as a member of the Liberal Party of Canada.

He was born in 1822 in Aurora, Upper Canada, the son of John Wells, was educated in York County and settled in King Township. Wells married Lydia Norman. He served on King Township council as reeve for the township from 1860 to 1863. He was elected to the Legislative Assembly of the Province of Canada in the North riding of York in 1863 and was elected to the federal parliament after Confederation. He died in Aurora in 1893 at the age of 74.

== ELectoral record ==
1867 Canadian federal election: York North
Party	Candidate	Votes
Liberal	James Pearson Wells	acclaimed
Source: Canadian Elections Database
