= John Alexander Macdonald Armstrong =

Canadian politician

Member of Parliament for York North
- In office 1911–1921
- Preceded by: A. B. Aylesworth
- Succeeded by: William Lyon Mackenzie King

Personal details
- Born: November 19, 1877 King Township, Ontario, Canada
- Died: February 2, 1926 (aged 48)
- Party: Conservative, Unionist Party
- Profession: conveyancer, real estate agent

John Alexander Macdonald Armstrong (November 19, 1877 – February 2, 1926) was a Canadian politician, conveyancer and real estate agent. He was elected to the House of Commons of Canada in the 1911 election as a Member of the historical Conservative Party and re-elected in 1917 as a Unionist. He ran in the elections of 1908 and 1921 as a Conservative and lost both elections. Born in King Township, Ontario, Canada, prior to his federal political experience, he served on King Township council as reeve of the township in 1908.

== Electoral record ==
1908 Canadian federal election: York North
Party	Candidate	Votes
Liberal	Allen Bristol Aylesworth	2,856
Conservative	John Alexander Macdonald Armstrong	2,550

1911 Canadian federal election: York North
Party	Candidate	Votes
Conservative	John Alexander Macdonald Armstrong	2,730
Liberal	Thomas Cowper Robinette	2,671

1917 Canadian federal election: York North
Party	Candidate	Votes	%	Elected
Government (Unionist)	John Alexander Macdonald Armstrong	3,948	57.91	✓
Opposition (Laurier Liberals)	William Lyon Mackenzie King	2,870	42.09	
Total valid votes		6,818	100.00	
Source(s) "York North, Ontario (1867-08-06 - 2004-05-22)". History of Federal Ridings Since 1867. Library of Parliament.
