= Alfred Hutchinson Dymond =

Canadian politician

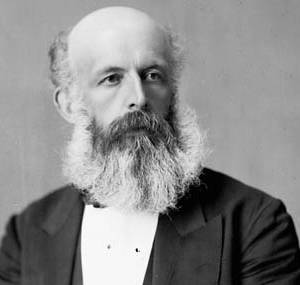

Member of Parliament for York North
- In office 1874–1878

Personal details
- Born: August 21, 1827 Croydon, England
- Died: May 11, 1903 (aged 75) Brantford, Ontario, Canada
- Party: Liberal
- Spouse: Helen Susannah Henderson
- Profession: Writer, politician, educator

Alfred Hutchinson Dymond (August 21, 1827 – May 11, 1903) was a Canadian writer and politician.

Born in Croydon, England, the son of Henry Dymond, he emigrated to Canada in 1869. He was an editorial writer for the Toronto Globe (now the Toronto Globe and Mail after amalgamation). In 1874 he was elected to sit for York North in the Parliament of Canada. He was re-elected in a contested by-election in 1875 and continued to sit until being defeated in the general election of 1878.

He was appointed to the Agriculture Commission which published five volumes during his tenure as chief executive officer. In 1880 he was appointed principal of the Ontario School for the Blind.

Originally a Quaker, in 1852, Dymond married Helen Susannah Henderson, an Anglican, and later became active in the Anglican church. Dymond died in Brantford at the age of 75, and he was buried in St. James Cemetery in Toronto.

His daughter-in-law, Emma Stanton Mellish was one of the first two women to graduate from the University of Trinity College (later part of the University of Toronto).

1874 Canadian federal election: York North
Party	Candidate	Votes
Liberal	Alfred Hutchinson Dymond	1,854
Independent	W.H. Thorne	1,516
Source: lop.parl.ca

1878 Canadian federal election: York North
Party	Candidate	Votes
Conservative	Frederick William Strange	1,792
Liberal	Alfred Hutchinson Dymond	1,778

== Notes ==
Parliament of Canada
Preceded by Anson Dodge	Member of Parliament for York North; 1874–1878	Succeeded by Frederick William Strange
