= Elihu Davis =

Canadian politician

Elihu Davis Sr.
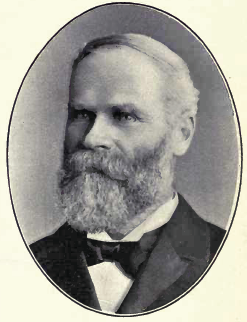

Ontario MPP
- In office 1888–1904
- Preceded by: Joseph Henry Widdifield
- Succeeded by: Thomas Herbert Lennox
- Constituency: York North

Personal details
- Born: December 2, 1851 York Township, Canada West
- Died: June 14, 1936 (aged 84) Toronto, Ontario
- Party: Liberal
- Cabinet: Provincial Secretary and Registrar (1896–1899); Commissioner of Crown Lands (1899–1904)

Elihu James Davis (December 2, 1851 – June 18, 1936) was an Ontario businessman and political figure. He represented York North in the Legislative Assembly of Ontario as a Liberal member from 1888 to 1904.

Davis was born in York Township, Canada West in 1851, the son of Andrew Davis. He entered business with his father, who owned a tannery in King Township. In 1874, he married Maggie Johnston. Children of this union were five sons: Elmer Davis, Harold Davis, Aubrey Davis, Andrew Davis and Elihu James Davis Jr. and two daughters Mabel Davis and Edith Davis [wife of Alfred Webb]. Davis served on the council for King Township and was reeve from 1883 to 1886. He also served as warden for York County in 1884. In the same year, his father retired and Davis took ownership of the business. He was first elected to the legislative assembly in 1888 after the resignation of Joseph Widdifield. Davis was Provincial Secretary and Registrar of Ontario from 1896 to 1899 and Commissioner of Crown Lands from 1899 to 1904.

His grandsons Donald George Davis and Murray Edward Davis went on to careers in the theatre. Both are the sons of Elihu James Davis Jr.

He died at Wellesley Hospital in Toronto, and was interred in the Newmarket Cemetery in Newmarket.
