= Frederick William Strange =

Canadian politician

Member of the Canadian Parliament for York North
- In office February 13, 1879 – May 18, 1882
- Preceded by: Alfred Hutchinson Dymond
- Succeeded by: William Mulock

Personal details
- Born: September 9, 1844 Berkshire, England
- Died: June 5, 1897 (aged 52) Toronto, Ontario, England
- Party: Liberal-Conservative
- Spouses: Kate Bucknall (m. 1867) Esther Rose Brooks (m. 1868; div. 1893)
- Children: 1
- Education: University of Liverpool; University College London
- Profession: Physician; Surgeon

Frederick William Strange (September 9, 1844 – June 5, 1897) was an English-born physician, surgeon and political figure in Ontario, Canada. He represented York North in the House of Commons of Canada from 1878 to 1882 as a Liberal-Conservative member.

He was the son of Thomas Strange of Berkshire and studied medicine at Liverpool and University College in London. Strange came to Ontario in 1869. A long-time militia medical officer, he served as a deputy surgeon general for the Canadian militia from 1893 to 1896 and was coroner for York County. Strange was an unsuccessful candidate for a seat in the House of Commons in 1896. He died a year later at the age of 52.

The community of Strange was named in his honour after he secured a post office for the community in 1880.

1878 Canadian federal election: York North
Party	Candidate	Votes
Conservative	Frederick William Strange	1,792
Liberal	Alfred Hutchinson Dymond	1,778
