= Allen Bristol Aylesworth =

Canadian politician (1854–1952)

The Honourable Sir Allen Bristol Aylesworth PC, KCMG, QC

Minister of Justice Attorney General of Canada
- In office 4 June 1906 – 6 October 1911
- Preceded by: Charles Fitzpatrick
- Succeeded by: Charles Doherty

Postmaster General of Canada
- In office 16 October 1905 – 3 June 1906
- Preceded by: William Mulock
- Succeeded by: Rodolphe Lemieux

Minister of Labour
- In office 16 October 1905 – 3 June 1906
- Preceded by: William Mulock
- Succeeded by: Rodolphe Lemieux

Member of Parliament for York North
- In office November 22, 1905 – October 6, 1911
- Preceded by: William Mulock
- Succeeded by: John Alexander Macdonald Armstrong

Personal details
- Born: November 27, 1854 Newburgh, Canada West
- Died: February 13, 1952 (aged 97)
- Party: Liberal
- Education: University of Toronto

Sir Allen Bristol Aylesworth, PC, KCMG, QC (27 November 1854 – 13 February 1952) was a Canadian lawyer and parliamentarian.

== Life and career ==
Born in Newburgh, Canada West, of United Empire Loyalist ancestry, Aylesworth was educated at the University of Toronto, and called to the Ontario Bar in 1878. As the Canadian member of the Alaska Boundary Tribunal in 1903, he presented his country's views in a minority report. Elected to the Dominion parliament in 1905, he served in the cabinet of Sir Wilfrid Laurier as postmaster-general and minister of labour, 1905–1906, and minister of justice, 1906–1911, in which capacity he oversaw the pardon of Angelina Napolitano, Canada's first battered woman defence case. He acted as British representative at the North Atlantic Fisheries Arbitration in The Hague, 1910–1911, and was knighted for his services.

A Liberal, Aylesworth was elected to the House of Commons of Canada in a by-election on 22 November 1905 and re-elected in the 1908 as the Member of Parliament for the riding of York North in the province of Ontario. He served Cabinet of Canada under Sir Wilfrid Laurier as the Minister of Labour and Postmaster General of Canada from 16 October 1905 – 3 June 1906, and as the Minister of Justice and Attorney General of Canada from 4 June 1906 – 6 October 1911. On 11 January 1923 he was appointed to the Senate of Canada upon the recommendation of William Lyon Mackenzie King. He represented the senatorial division of North York, Ontario until his death.

== Legacy ==
Mount Aylesworth, aka Boundary Peak 177, a summit on the Alaska-British Columbia boundary, was named for him in 1927.

== Electoral record ==
By-election on 22 November 1905 On Mr. Mulock being appointed Judge
Party	Candidate	Votes
Liberal	Allen Bristol Aylesworth	2,729
Conservative	Arch. McCallum	2,235

1908 Canadian federal election: York North
Party	Candidate	Votes
Liberal	Allen Bristol Aylesworth	2,856
Conservative	John Alexander Macdonald Armstrong	2,550

Parliament of Canada
Preceded by William Mulock	Member of Parliament for York North; 1905–1911	Succeeded by John Alexander Macdonald Armstrong
Preceded by William Proudfoot	Senator for North York, Ontario; 1923–1952	Succeeded by Allan Woodrow
Political offices
Preceded by William Mulock	Postmaster General of Canada; 1905–1906	Succeeded by Rodolphe Lemieux
Preceded by William Mulock	Minister of Labour; 1905–1906	Succeeded by Rodolphe Lemieux
Preceded by Charles Fitzpatrick	Minister of Justice; 1906–1911	Succeeded by Charles Doherty
