= John Hollings Addison =

Canadian politician (1929–2010)

- Addison in 1966

Member of Parliament for York North
- In office 18 June 1962 – 24 June 1968
- Preceded by: Cecil A. Cathers
- Succeeded by: Barney Danson

Personal details
- Born: 18 December 1929 Toronto, Ontario, Canada
- Died: 23 February 2010 (aged 80)
- Party: Liberal
- Profession: Business executive

John Hollings Addison (18 December 1929 – 23 February 2010) was a Canadian politician and business executive. He was a Liberal Member of Parliament for the riding of York North from 1962 to 1968.

== Election results ==
1962 Canadian federal election: York North
Party	Candidate	Votes
Liberal	John Addison	18,094
Progressive Conservative	C.A. Tiny Cathers	17,168
New Democratic	Stanley John Hall	7,796
Social Credit	J. Alex Ford	528

1963 Canadian federal election: York North
Party	Candidate	Votes
Liberal	John Addison	21,668
Progressive Conservative	Charles Hooper	14,488
New Democratic	Stan Hall	8,591
Social Credit	John R. O'Brien	330

1965 Canadian federal election: York North
Party	Candidate	Votes
Liberal	John Addison	18,207
Progressive Conservative	Donald R. Martyn	16,459
New Democratic	Jim Norton	10,438
