= Barney Danson =

Canadian politician

The Honourable Barney Danson PC CC

Minister of National Defence
- In office October 12, 1976 – June 3, 1979
- Prime Minister: Pierre Trudeau
- Preceded by: James Armstrong Richardson
- Succeeded by: Allan McKinnon

Member of Parliament for York North
- In office June 25, 1968 – May 21, 1979
- Preceded by: John Hollings Addison
- Succeeded by: John A. Gamble

Personal details
- Born: Barnett Jerome Danson; February 8, 1921 Toronto, Ontario, Canada
- Died: October 17, 2011 (aged 90) Toronto, Ontario, Canada
- Party: Liberal
- Occupation: Diplomat; Consultant; Businessman; Consul General
- Awards: Order of Canada

Military service
- Branch/service: Canadian Army
- Years of service: 1939-1945
- Rank: Lieutenant-colonel
- Unit: The Queen's Own Rifles of Canada

Barnett Jerome "Barney" Danson PC CC (February 8, 1921 – October 17, 2011) was a Canadian politician and Cabinet minister.

== Family ==
Barnett Jerome "Barney" Danson was born to a Jewish family in Toronto's Parkdale neighbourhood. He joined The Queen's Own Rifles of Canada in 1939 as the Second World War broke out. He rose to the rank of Lieutenant and served until he was severely wounded, losing an eye, in the Battle of Normandy. His ailment created an interest in the Canadian National Institute for the Blind (CNIB) and its library for the blind and visually impaired, which he maintained until his death.

He returned to Canada and joined his family's insurance business before entering the plastics industry with his own company, the Danson Corporation. He also served as president of the Society of the Plastics Industry of Canada.

In 2002, his autobiography, Not Bad for a Sergeant: The Memoirs of Barney Danson, was published.

His son, Tim Danson, is a Toronto lawyer known as a victim's rights advocate and for having represented the families of Paul Bernardo's victims.

== Politics ==
Danson was first elected to the House of Commons of Canada in the 1968 general election as the Liberal Member of Parliament (MP) for the Toronto-area riding of York North. Danson was unsuccessful during his first attempt at politics as an Ontario Liberal Party candidate in the 1967 provincial election in the riding of York Mills.

In 1970, he became Parliamentary Secretary to Prime Minister Pierre Trudeau, and was appointed to the Cabinet in 1974 as Minister of State for urban affairs. In 1976, he was promoted to Minister of National Defence. While Minister of National Defence, he was appointed the Honorary Lieutenant Colonel of The Queen's Own Rifles of Canada, his regiment.

He served in that position until the defeat of the Liberal government in the 1979 general election, in which he lost his seat. Danson received an honorary degree (1993) from the Royal Military College of Canada in Kingston, of which he was a former chancellor.

As a Member of the Privy Council Danson was styled "The Honourable".

== Service ==
Danson is the co-founder along with Jacques Hébert of Katimavik, the national youth volunteer programme. Danson served as Canada's Consul General in Boston from 1984 to 1986.

He served on corporate and not-for-profit boards of directors such as the Canadian Executive Services Organization (CESO), Canadian Council of Christians and Jews, the Atlantic Council, the Empire Club of Canada, the Ballet Opera House Corporation, de Havilland Aircraft of Canada, Algoma Central Corporation, General Steelwares, the Royal Conservatory of Music, and Canadian Council for Aboriginal Business.

During his last years, Danson was chairman of the advisory committee of the Canadian War Museum in Ottawa and produced No Price Too High, a six-part series broadcast on CBC Television on Canada's role in World War II.

A theatre in the Canadian War Museum is named for him in honour of his service and to his four closest war-time friends killed in action; Sgt Fred B. Harris-Queen's, Lt Gerald Rayner, Lt Earl R. Stoll, and Lt Harlan David Keely.

== Awards ==
Danson was named an Officer of France's National Order of Merit (1994), and the Churchill Society's Award for "Excellence in the Cause of Parliamentary Democracy" (1995). In 1996, Danson was named an Officer of the Order of Canada and promoted to Companion in 2008.

In 2000, he was awarded the Vimy Award. In 2006, Danson was made an honorary Doctor of Laws by York University of Toronto.

He was sworn in as a Member of the Privy Council on August 8, 1974, which gave him the title "The Honourable" for life.

On March 28, 2007, he was made a Chevalier of the French Legion of Honour.

- Barney Danson's Medals were in Order of Precedence

| Ribbon | Description | Notes |
| | Order of Canada (CC) | 2008: Companion 2008; Officer 1996 |
| | 1939-45 Star | |
| | France and Germany Star | |
| | Defence Medal | |
| | Canadian Volunteer Service Medal | With Overseas Clasp |
| | War Medal 1939–1945 | |
| | Queen Elizabeth II Silver Jubilee Medal | 1977: Canadian Version of this Medal |
| | 125th Anniversary of the Confederation of Canada Medal | 1992 |
| | Queen Elizabeth II Golden Jubilee Medal | 2002: Canadian Version of this Medal |
| | Legion of Honour | 28 March 2007: Chevalier |
| | National Order of Merit | 1994: Officer |

== Archives ==
There is a Barney Danson fonds at Library and Archives Canada.

== Electoral record ==
1968 Canadian federal election: York North
| Party | Candidate | Votes |
|---|---|---|
| Liberal | Barney Danson | 24,054 |
| Progressive Conservative | Gord Hurlburt | 15,693 |
| New Democratic | Jack Grant | 7,000 |

1972 Canadian federal election: York North
| Party | Candidate | Votes |
|---|---|---|
| Liberal | Barney Danson | 28,123 |
| Progressive Conservative | Stephen B. Roman | 25,844 |
| New Democratic | Jim Reid | 11,065 |

1974 Canadian federal election: York North
| Party | Candidate | Votes |
|---|---|---|
| Liberal | Barney Danson | 34,179 |
| Progressive Conservative | Stephen Roman | 26,386 |
| New Democratic | Jim Reid | 7,669 |
| Social Credit | Victor Upeslacis | 364 |

1979 Canadian federal election: York North
| Party | Candidate | Votes |
|---|---|---|
| Progressive Conservative | John A. Gamble | 29,011 |
| Liberal | Barney Danson | 21,990 |
| New Democratic | Bruce Searle | 7,591 |
| Libertarian | Dan Davidson | 430 |
| Independent | Neil Katzman | 279 |
| Marxist–Leninist | Paul Herman | 37 |
