= Thomas Herbert Lennox =

Canadian politician

Member of Parliament for York North
- In office 1926–1934
- Preceded by: William Lyon Mackenzie King
- Succeeded by: William Pate Mulock

Ontario MPP
- In office 1905–1923
- Preceded by: Elihu Davis
- Succeeded by: William Keith
- Constituency: York North

Personal details
- Born: August 7, 1869 Innisfil Township, Simcoe County, Ontario, Canada
- Died: May 3, 1934 (aged 64) Toronto, Ontario, Canada
- Party: Conservative
- Spouse: Louise Meeking (m. 1894)
- Occupation: Lawyer

Military service
- Allegiance: Canadian
- Branch/service: Army
- Years of service: 1914-1919
- Rank: Lieutenant-Colonel
- Commands: 208th Battalion

Thomas Herbert Lennox (August 7, 1869 – May 3, 1934) was an Ontario lawyer and political figure. He represented York North in the Legislative Assembly of Ontario from 1905 to 1923 and in the House of Commons of Canada from 1926 to 1934 as a Conservative member.

He was born in Innisfil Township, Simcoe County, Ontario, the son of Thomas Lennox, an Irish immigrant, and was educated in Barrie and at Osgoode Hall. In 1894, he married Louise Meeking. He served three years on the town council and six years on the school board for Aurora. Lennox was also president of the Canadian Lacrosse Association. He was appointed a Patron of the Canadian Soccer Association, then known as the Dominion of Canada Football Association. He served as a lieutenant-colonel with the 208th Battalion, an Irish Canadian unit that he helped organize, during World War I. Lennox died in office in 1934.

In the 1925 federal election in York North, Lennox defeated Liberal Prime Minister William Lyon Mackenzie King. King was later elected in a by-election held in the Prince Albert riding in Saskatchewan.

1925 Canadian federal election: York North
Party	Candidate	Votes	%	Elected
Conservative	Thomas Herbert Lennox	10,028	51.26	✓
Liberal	William Lyon Mackenzie King	9,534	48.74	
Total valid votes		19,562	100.00	
Source(s) "York North, Ontario (1867-08-06 - 2004-05-22)". History of Federal Ridings Since 1867. Library of Parliament.

1926 Canadian federal election: York North
Party	Candidate	Votes
Conservative	Thomas Herbert Lennox	10,160
Liberal	Henry Arthur Sifton	9,860

1926 Canadian federal election: York North
Party	Candidate	Votes
Conservative	Thomas Herbert Lennox	10,160
Liberal	Henry Arthur Sifton	9,860

1930 Canadian federal election: York North
Party	Candidate	Votes
Progressive Conservative	Thomas Herbert Lennox	10,402
Liberal	William Pate Mulock	10,104
Source: lop.parl.ca
