= Joseph Henry Widdifield =

Canadian politician (1845–1906)

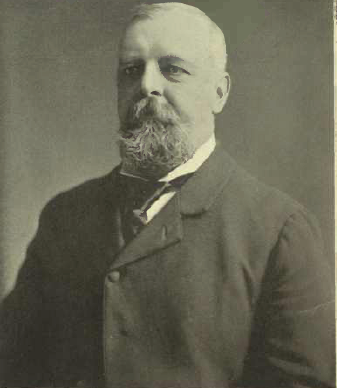

Ontario MPP
- In office 1875–1888
- Preceded by: Alfred Boultbee
- Succeeded by: Elihu Davis
- Constituency: York North

Personal details
- Born: June 12, 1845; Whitchurch, Upper Canada
- Died: June 3, 1906 (aged 60); Toronto, Ontario, Canada
- Political party: Liberal
- Occupation: Doctor

Joseph Henry Widdifield (June 12, 1845 – June 3, 1906) was a Canadian physician and political figure. He represented York North in the Legislative Assembly of Ontario as a Liberal member from 1875 to 1888.

== Life ==
Widdifield was born on June 12, 1845, in Whitchurch, Upper Canada, to Charles Ellis Widdifield, and studied medicine at Victoria College and St Thomas's Hospital Medical School in London. On his return to Canada, Widdifield set up practice in Newmarket. He served as a coroner and justice of the peace of Victoria County. He also served in the militia during the Fenian raids. He was whip for the provincial Liberal party from 1877 to 1883. Widdifield served as deputy Grand Master for the Masonic order in the Toronto district and also served as provincial medical examiner for the order. In 1888, he resigned his seat in the assembly to accept the position of sheriff for York County. He died on June 3, 1906, aged 60.

In 1965, Widdifield Secondary School in the Widdifield District of North Bay was named after him.

== Electoral history ==
1875 Ontario general election: York North
Party	Candidate	Votes	%	±%
Liberal	Joseph Henry Widdifield	1,835	57.69	+7.78
Independent	E. Jackson	1,346	42.31	
Total valid votes		3,181	65.36	−1.28
Eligible voters		4,867		
Liberal gain from Conservative		Swing		+7.78
Source: Elections Ontario
