= Strange, Ontario =

Strange
- Unincorporated community
- Interactive map of Strange
- Coordinates: 43°56′16″N 79°35′1″W
- Country: Canada
- Province: Ontario
- Regional Municipality: York
- Township: King

Government
  - Township mayor: Steve Pellegrini
  - MP: Anna Roberts
  - MPP: Stephen Lecce
  - Councillor: Peter Grandilli (Ward 2)
- Time zone: UTC-5 (EST)
  - Summer (DST): UTC-4 (EDT)
- Forward sortation area: L0G
- Area codes: 905 and 289
- NTS Map: 030M13
- GNBC Code: FCTBF

Strange is an unincorporated community west of King City in King Township, Ontario, Canada. It is directly north of Laskay to the west of Highway 400, and is a sparsely populated agricultural area.

Strange was founded as Williamstown in 1841, founded by William Wells who opened a general store. He abandoned his plans to expand the community into a town in 1853 when the Toronto, Simcoe & Lake Huron railway was built through the community of Springhill (now King City) instead of Williamstown. In 1854, the community's first post office closed, but another opened on 1 March 1880 through the efforts of Frederick William Strange, for whom the post office and the community were renamed. Today, only a few residential buildings remain, and only the Presbyterian Church and two graveyards provide links to its past.

== Geology ==
The Strange Till Plain is a flat ground moraine with underlying glacial till. It was formed by the Ontario ice lobe during the Port Huron Stadial. It is believed that this till plain exhibits the original surface; very little erosion or surface deposition is observable throughout its 3 square kilometre range.

This Till plain is located between and within the Albion and Uxbridge wedges of the Oak Ridges Moraine, and is a constituent part of that moraine.
