= Cecil Cathers =

Canadian politician

Cecil Alexander (Tiny) Cathers

Member of Parliament for York North
- In office June 1957 – June 1962
- Preceded by: Jack Smith
- Succeeded by: John Addison

Personal details
- Born: 21 April 1901 Toronto, Ontario
- Died: 6 December 1989 (aged 88) Toronto, Ontario
- Party: Progressive Conservative
- Spouse: Katherine (Kaye) Dean
- Profession: business executive, farmer

Cecil Alexander (Tiny) Cathers (21 April 1901 – 6 December 1989) was a Progressive Conservative party member of the House of Commons of Canada. He was born in Toronto, Ontario and became a business executive and farmer by career.

He was first elected at the York North riding in the 1957 general election after a previous unsuccessful attempt to win a seat there in the 1953 election. Cathers was re-elected in the 1958 election, but defeated by John Addison of the Liberal party in the 1962 election.

Cathers died at Toronto's Queen Elizabeth Hospital on 6 December 1989.

== Electoral record ==
1953 Canadian federal election: York North
Party	Candidate	Votes
Liberal	Jack Smith	10,988
Progressive Conservative	Cecil Cathers	9,355
Co-operative Commonwealth	Donald Scott	2,116

1957 Canadian federal election: York North
Party	Candidate	Votes
Progressive Conservative	Cecil Cathers	17,770
Liberal	Jack Rye	10,753
Social Credit	Allan A. Alton	1,653

1958 Canadian federal election: York North
Party	Candidate	Votes
Progressive Conservative	Cecil Cathers	21,499
Liberal	Sam Cook	9,523
Co-operative Commonwealth	Fred Prentice	2,148
Social Credit	W. Dave Greer	494

1962 Canadian federal election: York North
Party	Candidate	Votes
Liberal	John Addison	18,094
Progressive Conservative	C.A. Tiny Cathers	17,168
New Democratic	Stanley John Hall	7,796
Social Credit	J. Alex Ford	528
