= Canadian federal election results in Southern Durham and York =

Seats obtained by party
Liberal
Conservative
New Democratic
Progressive Conservative (defunct)
Independents

Canadian federal elections have provided the following results in the suburban sections of Durham and York Regions.

== Regional profile ==
The region is within the 905 Area Code (often referred to as the "905 belt"), and is populated predominantly by middle class, suburban voters. After leaning Liberal from 1968 to 1974, the area tilted conservative in the late 1970s and 1980s, when it only had three seats, helping the PCs win two majority governments in the 1980s. Support for the Co-operative Commonwealth Federation and the New Democratic Party, however, was heavy in the unionist city of Oshawa, especially when popular NDP leader Ed Broadbent held that seat from the late 1960s to late 1980s.

However, rapid growth of the Greater Toronto Area accompanied with an influx of immigrants and urban professionals turned the region into a Liberal stronghold, similar to the outer areas of the City of Toronto and the Mississauga-Brampton-Oakville area to the west of Toronto. The only standout being the election of a PC MP in Markham in 1997. By 2000, the Liberals swept all seven of its seats and its provincial rejection of the Tories in 2003 helped to secure Dalton McGuinty's provincial liberal landslide majority.

In 2006, the Liberals easily held onto most of the seats, with the exception of Oshawa and Whitby—Oshawa, which were taken by the Conservatives. In 2008, the Conservatives gained another two seats, Thornhill and Oak Ridges—Markham, and in a 2010 by-election the riding of Vaughan. In 2011, the Conservatives took another 3 seats (Ajax—Pickering, Pickering—Scarborough East and Richmond Hill); leaving the Liberals with one seat of nine in the area - Markham—Unionville. In 2015, however, the meltdown of Tory support in southern Ontario saw the Liberals seize all but three of the region's 12 seats, those being Oshawa, Thornhill, and - surprisingly - Markham—Unionville, a riding with historically low Conservative support.

The region saw very little change in votes shares the 2019 and 2021 elections. The Conservatives flipped Aurora—Oak Ridges—Richmond Hill in a 2018 by-election, retained it in 2019 but lost it to the Liberals in 2021 along with Markham—Unionville whereby King—Vaughan went in the other direction.

=== Votes by party throughout time ===
Election	Liberal	Conservative	New Democratic	Green	People's	PC	Reform / Alliance	Others
1979	46,819; 28.2%	—N/a	48,191; 29.0%	—N/a	—N/a	69,963; 42.1%	—N/a	1,087; 0.7%
1980	49,904; 31.1%	—N/a	48,506; 30.2%	—N/a	—N/a	60,647; 37.8%	—N/a	1,053; 0.7%
1984	43,272; 20.6%	—N/a	48,164; 22.9%	—N/a	—N/a	86,146; 41.0%	—N/a	32,609; 15.5%
1988	91,073; 33.7%	—N/a	48,953; 18.1%	—N/a	—N/a	123,118; 45.6%	—N/a	6,724; 2.5%
1993	161,775; 50.5%	—N/a	13,546; 4.2%	402; 0.1%	—N/a	58,191; 18.2%	78,006; 24.3%	8,247; 2.6%
1997	168,932; 50.7%	—N/a	21,431; 6.4%	—N/a	—N/a	80,670; 24.2%	57,717; 17.3%	4,352; 1.3%
2000	201,228; 59.3%	—N/a	14,428; 4.3%	2,179; 0.6%	—N/a	46,504; 13.7%	73,092; 21.5%	1,259; 0.4%
2004	238,824; 52.8%	136,942; 30.3%	55,992; 12.4%	17,411; 3.8%	—N/a	—N/a	—N/a	1,603; 0.4%
2006	254,659; 48.7%	178,165; 34.1%	65,685; 12.6%	20,380; 3.9%	—N/a	—N/a	—N/a	2,248; 0.4%
2008	195,238; 40.5%	192,317; 39.9%	60,008; 12.5%	32,056; 6.7%	—N/a	—N/a	—N/a	1,921; 0.4%
2011	149,405; 27.8%	268,791; 50.0%	100,359; 18.7%	16,941; 3.2%	—N/a	—N/a	—N/a	750; 0.1%
2015	296,204; 45.6%	277,441; 42.7%	62,307; 9.6%	11,639; 1.8%	—N/a	—N/a	—N/a	1,657; 0.3%
2019	300,748; 43.7%	264,352; 38.4%	72,853; 10.6%	27,249; 4.0%	8,303; 1.2%	—N/a	—N/a	14,607; 2.1%
2021	275,282; 45.3%	232,987; 38.4%	67,738; 11.2%	8,175; 1.3%	21,691; 3.6%	—N/a	—N/a	1,464; 0.2%

Liberal Conservative New Democratic Green People's	Progressive Conservative (defunct) Alliance (defunct) Reform (defunct)

== Detailed results ==
=== 2015 ===
Electoral district	Candidates					Incumbent
Electoral district	Conservative	NDP	Liberal	Green	Other	Incumbent
Ajax	Chris Alexander; 19,374; 34.41%	Stephanie Brown; 4,630; 8.22%	Mark Holland; 31,458; 55.87%	Jeff Hill; 788; 1.40%	Bob Kesic (United); 57; 0.10%	Chris Alexander; Ajax—Pickering
Aurora—Oak Ridges— Richmond Hill	Costas Menegakis; 23,039; 45.19%	Brenda Power; 2,912; 5.71%	Leona Alleslev; 24,132; 47.34%	Randi Ramdeen; 654; 1.28%	Kyle Bowles (Animal All.); 243; 0.48%	New District
King—Vaughan	Konstantin Toubis; 24,170; 44.20%	Natalie Rizzo; 3,571; 6.53%	Deb Schulte; 25,908; 47.38%	Ann Raney; 1,037; 1.90%		New District
Markham—Stouffville	Paul Calandra; 25,565; 42.77%	Gregory Hines; 3,647; 6.10%	Jane Philpott; 29,416; 49.21%	Myles O'Brien; 1,145; 1.92%		Paul Calandra; Oak Ridges—Markham
Markham—Thornhill	Jobson Easow; 13,849; 32.31%	Senthi Chelliah; 4,595; 10.72%	John McCallum; 23,878; 55.72%	Joshua Russell; 535; 1.25%		New District
Markham—Unionville	Bob Saroya; 24,605; 49.37%	Colleen Zimmerman; 2,528; 5.07%	Bang-Gu Jiang; 21,596; 43.33%	Elvin Kao; 1,110; 2.23%		John McCallum‡
Oshawa	Colin Carrie; 23,162; 38.17%	Mary Fowler; 19,339; 31.87%	Tito-Dante Marimpietri; 16,588; 27.33%	Michael Dempsey; 1,522; 2.51%	David Gershuny (M-L); 75; 0.12%	Colin Carrie
Pickering—Uxbridge	Corneliu Chisu; 22,591; 38.19%	Pamela Downward; 5,446; 9.21%	Jennifer O'Connell; 29,757; 50.30%	Anthony Jordan Navarro; 1,365; 2.31%		Corneliu Chisu; Pickering—Scarborough East
Richmond Hill	Michael Parsa; 21,275; 43.32%	Adam DeVita; 3,950; 8.04%	Majid Jowhari; 23,032; 46.90%	Gwendolyn Veenema; 856; 1.74%		Costas Menegakis‡
Thornhill	Peter Kent; 31,911; 58.56%	Lorne Cherry; 2,814; 5.16%	Nancy Coldham; 18,395; 33.76%	Josh Rachlis; 627; 1.15%	Gene Balfour (Libert.); 587 1.08%	Peter Kent
Thornhill	Peter Kent; 31,911; 58.56%	Lorne Cherry; 2,814; 5.16%	Nancy Coldham; 18,395; 33.76%	Josh Rachlis; 627; 1.15%	Margaret Leigh Fairbairn (Seniors); 157 0.29%	Peter Kent
Vaughan—Woodbridge	Julian Fantino; 20,746; 43.86%	Adriana Marie Zichy; 2,198; 4.65%	Francesco Sorbara; 23,041; 48.71%	Elise Boulanger; 597; 1.26%	Anthony Gualtieri (Libert.); 716; 1.51%	Julian Fantino; Vaughan
Whitby	Pat Perkins; 27,154; 42.09%	Ryan Kelly; 6,677; 10.35%	Celina Caesar-Chavannes; 29,003; 44.95%	Craig Cameron; 1,403; 2.17%	Jon O'Connor (Ind.); 279; 0.43%	Pat Perkins; Whitby—Oshawa

=== 2011 ===
Electoral district	Candidates					Incumbent
Electoral district	Conservative	Liberal	NDP	Green	Other	Incumbent
Ajax—Pickering	Chris Alexander; 24,797; 44.07%	Mark Holland; 21,569; 38.33%	Jim Koppens; 8,270; 14.70%	Mike Harilaid; 1,561; 2.77%	Bob Kesic (United); 71; 0.13%	Mark Holland
Markham—Unionville	Bob Saroya; 17,734; 35.55%	John McCallum; 19,429; 38.95%	Nadine Marie Hawkins; 10,897; 21.84%	Adam Poon; 1,597; 3.20%	Allen Small (Libert.); 231; 0.46%	John McCallum
Oak Ridges—Markham	Paul Calandra; 46,241; 51.12%	Lui Temelkovski; 25,561; 28.26%	Janice Hagan; 15,229; 16.84%	Trifon Haitas; 2,349; 2.60%	John Siciliano (PC); 1,080; 1.19%	Paul Calandra
Oshawa	Colin Carrie; 26,034; 51.31%	James Cooper Morton; 3,536; 6.97%	Chris Buckley; 19,212; 37.87%	Gail Bates; 1,631; 3.21%	Matthew Belanger (Libert.); 260 0.51%	Colin Carrie
Oshawa	Colin Carrie; 26,034; 51.31%	James Cooper Morton; 3,536; 6.97%	Chris Buckley; 19,212; 37.87%	Gail Bates; 1,631; 3.21%	David Gershuny (M-L); 61 0.12%	Colin Carrie
Pickering— Scarborough East	Corneliu Chisu; 19,220; 40.11%	Dan McTeague; 18,013; 37.59%	Andrea Moffat; 8,932; 18.64%	Kevin Smith; 1,751; 3.65%		Dan McTeague
Richmond Hill	Costas Menegakis; 22,078; 44.14%	Bryon Wilfert; 17,671; 35.33%	Adam DeVita; 8,433; 16.86%	Cameron W. Hastings; 1,832; 3.66%		Bryon Wilfert
Thornhill	Peter Kent; 36,629; 61.38%	Karen Mock; 14,125; 23.67%	Simon Strelchik; 7,141; 11.97%	Norbert Koehl; 1,562; 2.62%	Liz White (AAEVP); 215 0.36%	Peter Kent
Vaughan	Julian Fantino; 38,533; 56.32%	Mario Ferri; 20,435; 29.87%	Mark Pratt; 7,940; 11.60%	Claudia Rodriguez-Larrain; 1,515; 2.21%		Julian Fantino
Whitby—Oshawa	Jim Flaherty; 37,525; 58.42%	Trevor Bardens; 9,066; 14.11%	Trish McAuliffe; 14,305; 22.27%	Rebecca Harrison; 3,143; 4.89%	Josh Insang (Libert.); 198 0.31%	Jim Flaherty

=== 2008 ===
Electoral district	Candidates					Incumbent
Electoral district	Conservative	Liberal	NDP	Green	Other	Incumbent
Ajax—Pickering	Rick Johnson; 18,471; 37.95%	Mark Holland; 21,675; 44.53%	Bala Thavarajasoorier; 4,422; 9.08%	Mike Harilaid; 3,543; 7.28%	Kevin Norng (CHP); 398 0.82%	Mark Holland
Ajax—Pickering	Rick Johnson; 18,471; 37.95%	Mark Holland; 21,675; 44.53%	Bala Thavarajasoorier; 4,422; 9.08%	Mike Harilaid; 3,543; 7.28%	Stephanie Wilson (Libert.); 167 0.34%	Mark Holland
Markham—Unionville	Duncan Fletcher; 13,855; 30.13%	John McCallum; 25,296; 55.02%	Nadine Hawkins; 4,682; 10.18%	Leonard Aitken; 1,921; 4.18%	Allen Small (Libert.); 225; 0.49%	John McCallum
Oak Ridges—Markham	Paul Calandra; 32,028; 42.24%	Lui Temelkovski; 31,483; 41.52%	Andy Arifin; 7,126; 9.40%	Richard Taylor; 5,184; 6.84%		Lui Temelkovski
Oshawa	Colin Carrie; 19,951; 41.37%	Sean Godfrey; 7,741; 16.05%	Mike Shields; 16,750; 34.73%	Pat Gostlin; 3,374; 7.00%	David Gershuny (M-L); 117 0.24%	Colin Carrie
Oshawa	Colin Carrie; 19,951; 41.37%	Sean Godfrey; 7,741; 16.05%	Mike Shields; 16,750; 34.73%	Pat Gostlin; 3,374; 7.00%	Alex Kreider (CAP); 52 0.11%	Colin Carrie
Oshawa	Colin Carrie; 19,951; 41.37%	Sean Godfrey; 7,741; 16.05%	Mike Shields; 16,750; 34.73%	Pat Gostlin; 3,374; 7.00%	Peter Vogel (CHP); 246 0.51%	Colin Carrie
Pickering— Scarborough East	George Khouri; 14,940; 32.45%	Dan McTeague; 22,874; 49.69%	Andrea Moffat; 4,875; 10.59%	Jason Becevello; 3,023; 6.57%	Rick Chue (CHP); 191 0.41%	Dan McTeague
Pickering— Scarborough East	George Khouri; 14,940; 32.45%	Dan McTeague; 22,874; 49.69%	Andrea Moffat; 4,875; 10.59%	Jason Becevello; 3,023; 6.57%	Chai Kalevar (CAP); 130 0.28%	Dan McTeague
Richmond Hill	Chungsen Leung; 16,318; 35.69%	Bryon Wilfert; 21,488; 47.00%	Wess Dowsett; 4,526; 9.90%	Dylan Marando; 3,388; 7.41%		Bryon Wilfert
Thornhill	Peter Kent; 26,660; 49.01%	Susan Kadis; 21,448; 39.43%	Simon Strelchik; 3,601; 6.62%	Norbert Koehl; 2,686; 4.94%		Susan Kadis
Vaughan	Richard Lorello; 19,390; 34.33%	Maurizio Bevilacqua; 27,773; 49.18%	Vicky Wilkin; 5,442; 9.64%	Adrian Visentin; 3,870; 6.85%		Maurizio Bevilacqua
Whitby—Oshawa	Jim Flaherty; 30,704; 50.99%	Brent Fullard; 15,460; 25.68%	David Purdy; 8,584; 14.26%	Doug Anderson; 5,067; 8.42%	Yvonne Forbes (CHP); 395; 0.66%	Jim Flaherty

=== 2006 ===
Electoral district	Candidates					Incumbent
Electoral district	Liberal	Conservative	NDP	Green	Other	Incumbent
Ajax—Pickering	Mark Holland; 25,636; 49.38%	Rondo Thomas; 16,992; 32.73%	Kevin Modeste; 6,655; 12.82%	Russell Korus; 2,199; 4.24%	Kevin Norng (CHP); 435; 0.84%	Mark Holland
Markham—Unionville	John McCallum; 32,769; 61.89%	Joe Li; 14,153; 26.73%	Janice Hagan; 4,257; 8.04%	Wesley Weese; 1,146; 2.16%	Fayaz Choudhary (PC); 321 0.61%	John McCallum
Markham—Unionville	John McCallum; 32,769; 61.89%	Joe Li; 14,153; 26.73%	Janice Hagan; 4,257; 8.04%	Wesley Weese; 1,146; 2.16%	Partap Dua (Ind.); 297 0.56%	John McCallum
Oak Ridges—Markham	Lui Temelkovski; 35,083; 47.06%	Bob Callow; 28,683; 38.47%	Pamela Courtout; 7,367; 9.88%	Steve Armes; 3,423; 4.59%		Lui Temelkovski
Oshawa	Louise Parkes; 12,831; 23.98%	Colin Carrie; 20,657; 38.61%	Sid Ryan; 17,905; 33.47%	Adam Jobse; 2,019; 3.77%	David Gershuny (M-L); 91; 0.17%	Colin Carrie
Pickering— Scarborough East	Dan McTeague; 27,719; 52.68%	Tim Dobson; 16,693; 31.73%	Gary Dale; 6,090; 11.57%	Jeff Brownridge; 1,869; 3.55%	Pedro Gonsalves (Ind.); 176 0.33%	Dan McTeague
Pickering— Scarborough East	Dan McTeague; 27,719; 52.68%	Tim Dobson; 16,693; 31.73%	Gary Dale; 6,090; 11.57%	Jeff Brownridge; 1,869; 3.55%	Chai Kalevar (CAP); 70 0.13%	Dan McTeague
Richmond Hill	Bryon Wilfert; 27,837; 53.58%	Joe Di Paola; 16,564; 31.88%	Wess Dowsett; 5,176; 9.96%	Tim Rudkins; 2,379; 4.58%		Bryon Wilfert
Thornhill	Susan Kadis; 29,934; 53.10%	Anthony Reale; 19,005; 33.71%	Simon Strelchik; 4,405; 7.81%	Lloyd Helferty; 1,934; 3.43%	Mark Abramowitz (PC); 1,094; 1.94%	Susan Kadis
Vaughan	Maurizio Bevilacqua; 36,968; 59.72%	Richard Majkot; 16,124; 26.05%	Yurgo Alexopoulos; 5,114; 8.26%	Adrian Visentin; 3,004; 4.85%	Paolo Fabrizio (Libert.); 688; 1.11%	Maurizio Bevilacqua
Whitby—Oshawa	Judi Longfield; 25,882; 38.75%	Jim Flaherty; 29,294; 43.86%	Maret Sadem-Thompson; 8,716; 13.05%	Ajay Krishnan; 2,407; 3.60%	Tom Cochrane (CAP); 217 0.32%	Judi Longfield
Whitby—Oshawa	Judi Longfield; 25,882; 38.75%	Jim Flaherty; 29,294; 43.86%	Maret Sadem-Thompson; 8,716; 13.05%	Ajay Krishnan; 2,407; 3.60%	Marty Gobin (Libert.); 274 0.41%	Judi Longfield

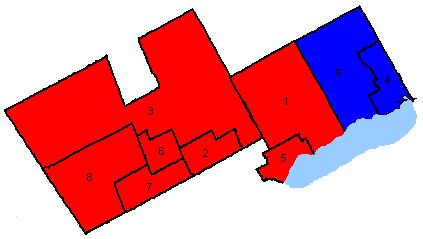
Key map

1. Ajax-Pickering
2. Markham-Unionville
3. Oak Ridges-Markham
4. Oshawa
5. Pickering-Scarborough East
6. Richmond Hill
7. Thornhill
8. Vaughan
9. Whitby-Oshawa

=== 2004 ===
==== Party rankings ====
For the first time since 1988 the Liberals ranked third in a riding of the region (in Oshawa) whereas the NDP achieved its first second position since that date.

Parties	1st	2nd	3rd	4th
Liberal	8	0	1	0
Conservative	1	7	0	0
New Democratic	0	1	6	0
Green	0	0	0	7

Electoral district	Candidates					Incumbent
Electoral district	Liberal	Conservative	NDP	Green	Other	Incumbent
Ajax—Pickering	Mark Holland; 21,706	René Soetens; 14,666	Kevin Modeste; 5,286	Karen MacDonald; 1,951		New district
Markham—Unionville	John McCallum; 30,442	Joe Li; 10,325	Janice Hagan; 3,993	Ed Wong; 1,148		John McCallum; Markham
Oak Ridges—Markham	Lui Temelkovski; 31,964	Bob Callow; 20,712	Pamela Courtot; 5,430	Bernadette Manning; 2,406	Jim Conrad (PC); 820; Maurice Whittle (CHP); 458	New district
Oshawa	Louise Parkes; 14,510	Colin Carrie; 15,815	Sid Ryan; 15,352	Liisa Whalley; 1,850	Tim Sullivan (M-L); 91	Ivan Grose
Pickering—Scarborough East	Dan McTeague; 27,312	Tim Dobson; 13,417	Gary Dale; 5,392	Matthew Pollesel; 1,809		Dan McTeague; Pickering—Ajax—Uxbridge
Richmond Hill	Bryon Wilfert; 27,102	Peter Merrifield; 11,530	Nella Cotrupi; 4,495	Tim Rudkins; 2,144	Ellena Lam (PC); 1,074	Bryon Wilfert; Oak Ridges
Thornhill	Susan Kadis; 28,709	Josh Cooper; 18,125	Rick Morelli; 3,671	Lloyd Helferty; 1,622	Simion Iron (Ind.); 233; Benjamin Fitzerman (Ind.); 241	Elinor Caplan
Vaughan	Maurizio Bevilacqua; 31,430	Joe Spina; 11,821	Octavia Beckles; 4,371	Russell Korus; 1,722	Paolo Fabrizio (Libert.); 388; Walter Aolari (CAP); 192	Maurizio Bevilacqua; Vaughan—King—Aurora
Whitby—Oshawa	Judi Longfield; 25,649	Ian MacNeil; 20,531	Maret Sadem-Thompson; 8,002	Michael MacDonald; 2,759		Judi Longfield; Whitby—Ajax

==== Maps ====
1. Ajax-Pickering
2. Markham-Unionville
3. Oak Ridges-Markham
4. Oshawa
5. Pickering-Scarborough East
6. Richmond Hill
7. Thornhill
8. Vaughan
9. Whitby-Oshawa
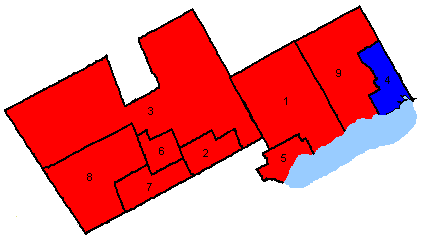
Key map

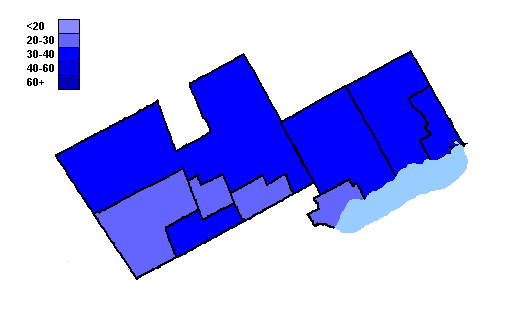
Conservative Party of Canada

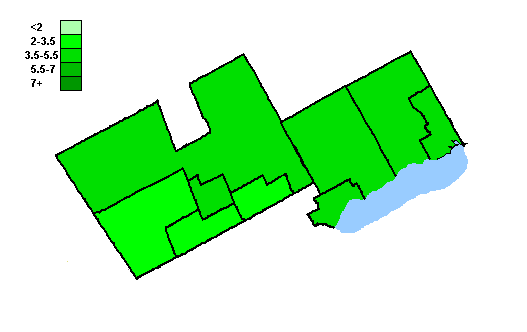
Green Party of Canada

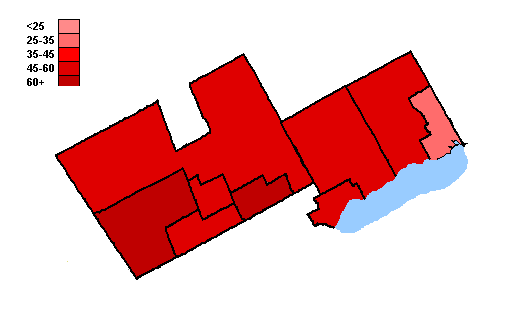
Liberal Party of Canada

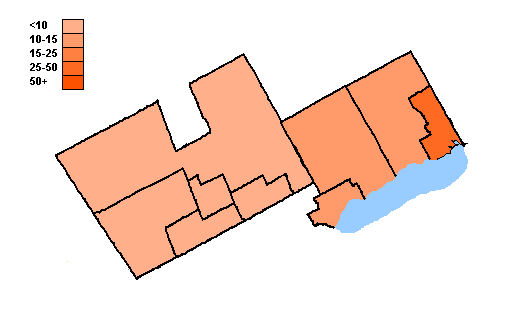
New Democratic Party

=== 2000 ===
==== Party rankings ====
The Liberal easily won in all 7 ridings with significant margins. The Canadian Alliance was able to significantly distance the Progressive Conservatives (who had arrived first or second in most ridings in 1997) ranking second in all 7 ridings.

Parties	1st	2nd	3rd	4th
Liberal	7	0	0	0
Alliance	0	7	0	0
Progressive Conservative	0	0	7	0
New Democratic	0	0	0	7

Electoral district	Candidates					Incumbent
Electoral district	Liberal	Canadian Alliance	NDP	PC	Other	Incumbent
Markham	John McCallum; 32,104; 66.64%	Jim Jones; 9,015; 18.71%	Janice Hagan; 1,129; 2.34%	David Scrymgeour; 5,085; 10.55%	Akber Choudhry (Ind.); 222 0.46% Jim Conrad (CAP); 130 0.27% Bernadette Manning (Green); 493 1.02%	Jim Jones
Oak Ridges	Bryon Wilfert; 33,058; 59.41%	Bob Callow; 11,714; 21.05%	Joseph Thevarkunnel; 1,623; 2.92%	John Oostrom; 8,409; 15.11%	Steven Haylestrom (Green); 672 1.21% Mary Wan (NLP); 172 0.31%	Bryon Wilfert
Oshawa	Ivan Grose; 16,179; 42.92%	Barry Bussey; 10,863; 28.82%	Bruce Rogers; 4,203; 11.15%	Bruce L. Wright; 5,675; 15.05%	David Gershuny (M-L); 97 0.26% Craig James Michael McMillan (Mar.); 679 1.80%	Ivan Grose
Pickering—Ajax—Uxbridge	Dan McTeague; 28,834; 57.44%	Ken Griffith; 11,941; 23.79%	Ralph Chatoor; 1,523; 3.03%	Michael Hills; 6,883; 13.71%	Chris Pennington (Green); 1,014; 2.02%	Dan McTeague
Thornhill	Elinor Caplan; 27,152; 64.59%	Robert Goldin; 6,643; 15.80%	Nathan Rotman; 1,653; 3.93%	Lou Watson; 6,338; 15.08%	Art Jaszczyk (CAP); 254; 0.60%	Elinor Caplan
Vaughan—King—Aurora	Maurizio Bevilacqua; 38,208; 67.22%	Adrian Visentin; 9,757; 17.17%	Octavia Beckles; 1,938; 3.41%	Menotti Mazzuca; 6,551; 11.53%	Lesley Knight (NA); 384; 0.68%	Maurizio Bevilacqua
Whitby—Ajax	Judi Longfield; 25,693; 52.68%	Shaun Gillespie; 13,159; 26.98%	Vic Perroni; 2,359; 4.84%	Rob Chopowick; 7,563; 15.51%		Judi Longfield

=== 1997 ===
==== Party rankings ====
Parties	1st	2nd	3rd	4th
Liberal	6	1	0	0
Progressive Conservative	1	4	2	0
Reform	0	2	5	0
New Democratic	0	0	0	7

Electoral district	Candidates					Incumbent
Electoral district	Liberal	Reform	NDP	PC	Other	Incumbent
Markham	Gobinder Randhawa; 16,810	John Paloc; 4,947	Bhanu Gaunt; 1,482	Jim Jones; 20,449	2,060	Jag Bhaduria (Note: Elected as a Liberal in 1993, left the caucus to sit as an independent MP in 1994.); Markham—Whitchurch-Stouffville
Oak Ridges	Bryon Wilfert; 27,394	Edward Sarafian; 7,568	Wynne Hartviksen; 2,411	John Andersen; 12,232	448	New district
Oshawa	Ivan Grose; 15,925	Andrew Davies; 11,974	Brian Nicholson; 7,350	Alan Hayes; 6,972		Ivan Grose
Pickering—Ajax—Uxbridge	Dan McTeague; 26,003	Ken Griffith; 10,537	Douglas W. Grey; 2,576	Leanne Lewis; 10,802		Dan McTeague; Ontario
Thornhill	Elinor Caplan; 25,747	Aurel David; 3,441	Helen Breslauer; 2,008	Bill Fisch; 11,517	926	New district
Vaughan—King—Aurora	Maurizio Bevilacqua; 33,502	Maralyn Hazelgrove; 7,273	Robert Navarretta; 2,250	Lara Coombs; 8,591	524	Maurizio Bevilacqua; York North
Whitby—Ajax	Judi Longfield; 23,551	Bill Serjeantson; 11,977	Karen Dolan; 3,354	Frank Snyder; 10,107	394	New district

=== 1993 ===
==== Party rankings ====
Parties	1st	2nd	3rd	4th
Liberal	4	0	0	0
Reform	0	3	1	0
Progressive Conservative	0	1	3	0
New Democratic	0	0	0	4

Electoral district	Candidates					Incumbent
Electoral district	Liberal	Reform	NDP	PC	Other	Incumbent
Markham—Whitchurch-Stouffville	Jag Bhaduria; 35,909	Joe Sherren; 17,937	Jack Grant; 1,692	Bill Attewell; 19,695	1,985	Bill Attewell
Ontario	Dan McTeague; 38,680	Don Sullivan; 28,097	Lynn Jacklin; 2,746	René Soetens; 16,872	2,836	René Soetens
Oshawa	Ivan Grose; 15,651	Andrew Davies; 11,826	Michael Breaugh; 6,102	Linda Dionne; 6,140	1,174	Michael Breaugh (Note: Elected in a 1990 by-election following the resignation of former NDP leader Ed Broadbent.)
York North	Maurizio Bevilacqua; 71,535	Heather Sinclair; 20,146	Peter M.A. DeVita; 3,006	Dario D'Angela; 15,484	2,841	Maurizio Bevilacqua (Note: Re-elected in a 1990 by-election after the 1988 election in York North was declared void and invalid.)

=== 1988 ===
==== Party rankings ====
Parties	1st	2nd	3rd
Progressive Conservative	2	2	0
Liberal	1	2	1
New Democratic	1	0	3

Electoral district	Candidates				Incumbent
Electoral district	PC	Liberal	NDP	Other	Incumbent
Markham	Bill Attewell; 36,673	Jag Bhaduria; 21,973	Susan Krone; 6,209	4,211	New district
Ontario	René Soetens; 34,969	John Roberts; 23,091	Jim Wiseman; 12,751	632	Thomas Fennell
Oshawa	Nancy Mclean; 14,040	Ed White; 8,496	Ed Broadbent; 18,410	588	Ed Broadbent
York North	Michael O'Brien; 37,436	Maurizio Bevilacqua; 37,513	Evelyn Buck; 11,583	1,293	Tony Roman
