= Vaughan—King—Aurora =

Former federal electoral district in Ontario, Canada

Ontario electoral district

Defunct federal electoral district
- Legislature: House of Commons
- District created: 1996
- District abolished: 2003
- First contested: 1997
- Last contested: 2000

Demographics
- Population (2001): 164,590
- Electors (2000): 98,805
- Area (km²): 494

Vaughan—King—Aurora was a federal electoral riding in Ontario, Canada, that was represented in the House of Commons of Canada from 1997 to 2004.

== Federal riding ==
The federal riding was created in 1996 as Vaughan—Aurora from parts of Markham, Oak Ridges, and York North ridings. It was subsequently renamed "Vaughan—King—Aurora".

It existed only for the 1997 and 2000 elections.

It was abolished in 2004, as ridings in York Region were redistributed due to its fast-growing population. The riding was redistributed into Newmarket—Aurora, Oak Ridges—Markham, and Vaughan ridings.

== Members of Parliament ==
This riding has elected the following members of Parliament:

Parliament	Years	Member	Party
Riding created from Markham, Oak Ridges and York North
36th	1997–2000	Maurizio Bevilacqua	Liberal
37th	2000–2004	Maurizio Bevilacqua	Liberal
Riding dissolved into Vaughan, Newmarket—Aurora and Oak Ridges—Markham

== Federal election results ==
1997 Canadian federal election
Party	Candidate	Votes
Liberal	Maurizio Bevilacqua	33,502
Progressive Conservative	Lara Coombs	8,591
Reform	Maralyn Hazelgrove	7,273
New Democratic	Robert Navarretta	2,250
Independent	Andrew James	524

2000 Canadian federal election
Party	Candidate	Votes
Liberal	Maurizio Bevilacqua	38,208
Alliance	Adrian Visentin	9,757
Progressive Conservative	Menotti Mazzuca	6,551
New Democratic	Octavia Beckles	1,938
No affiliation	Lesley Arden Knight	384

== See also ==
- List of Canadian electoral districts
- Historical federal electoral districts of Canada
