= Michael Guglielmin =

Canadian politician

Michael Guglielmin MP

Member of Parliament for Vaughan—Woodbridge
- Incumbent
- Assumed office April 28, 2025
- Preceded by: Francesco Sorbara

Personal details
- Born: December 27, 1984 (age 41) Woodbridge, Ontario, Canada
- Party: Conservative
- Spouse: Maria Guglielmin
- Children: 3
- Education: Dalhousie University, Humber College, York University
- Occupation: Business Executive, Politician
- Website: michaelguglielminmp.ca

Michael Guglielmin MP is a Canadian businessman and federal politician. He was elected Member of Parliament for Vaughan—Woodbridge in the 2025 Canadian federal election. Prior to his election to parliament, he worked in the steel industry and was an Executive Vice-President of Operations.

== Early life ==
Michael Guglielmin was born and raised in Woodbridge, Ontario. His father was a businessman and his mother was a school teacher. He has two siblings, a younger sister Carly, and a younger brother, Matthew.

== Education ==
Michael Guglielmin attended Pine Grove Elementary School and Woodbridge College High School. He earned a diploma in Business Management from Humber College and graduated summa cum laude with a Bachelor of Arts in Political Science from York University. He later entered the Master of Arts program in Political Theory at the University of Toronto but left the program to pursue a Master of Business Administration at Dalhousie University.

== Electoral record ==
2025 Canadian federal election: Vaughan—Woodbridge
Party	Candidate	Votes	%	±%	Expenditures
Conservative	Michael Guglielmin	40,358	59.89	+19.62	
Liberal	Francesco Sorbara	25,676	38.10	–8.05	
New Democratic	Ali Bahman	895	1.33	–5.60	
People's	Roman Yevseyev	455	0.68	–4.71	
Total valid votes/expense limit					
Total rejected ballots					
Turnout		67,384	71.24		
Eligible voters		94,586			
Conservative notional gain from Liberal		Swing		+13.84	
Source: Elections Canada
