= Anna Roberts =

Canadian politician

Anna Roberts MP

Member of Parliament for King—Vaughan
- Incumbent
- Assumed office September 20, 2021
- Preceded by: Deb Schulte

Personal details
- Born: November 11, 1957 (age 68)
- Party: Conservative
- Occupation: Politician

Anna Roberts (born November 11, 1957) is a Canadian politician who was elected as the Conservative Member of Parliament to represent the riding of King—Vaughan in the House of Commons of Canada in the 2021 Canadian federal election.

== Personal life ==
Prior to being elected, Roberts worked for over 30 years in the banking industry. She is the daughter of Italian immigrants.

Roberts has spent over 30 years volunteering with local organisations like the Salvation Army, the Toronto Hospital for Sick Children, and the King City Lodge Nursing Home.

At the time of the 2025 Canadian federal election, she lived in King, Ontario.

== Politics ==
=== Federal Politics ===
Roberts served as a critic in the Official Opposition Shadow Cabinet of the 44th Parliament of Canada, having been named the Conservatives' Shadow Minister for Seniors and Status of Women.

During the 2025 Canadian federal election, an Elections Canada worker allegedly encouraged residents to vote for the Conservative Party of Canada outside of an advanced polling station in Roberts' riding. A campaign spokesperson for Roberts said they "no knowledge of nor involvement in any such an event".

== Electoral results ==
2025 Canadian federal election: King—Vaughan
Party	Candidate	Votes	%	±%	Expenditures
Conservative	Anna Roberts	41,682	61.5	+16.63	
Liberal	Mubarak Ahmed	24,352	35.9	–7.22	
New Democratic	Samantha Sanchez	769	1.1	–5.34	
Green	Ann Raney	576	0.9	–0.38	
People's	Vageesh Sabharwal	368	0.5	–3.70	
Total valid votes/expense limit		67,747	99.2		
Total rejected ballots		584	0.8		
Turnout		68,331	71.9	+22.9	
Eligible voters		95,039			
Conservative hold		Swing		+11.93	
Source: Elections Canada

2021 Canadian federal election: King—Vaughan
Party	Candidate	Votes	%	±%
Conservative	Anna Roberts	22,534	45.1	+1.9
Liberal	Deb Schulte	21,458	42.9	-2.1
New Democratic	Sandra Lozano	3,234	6.5	-0.2
People's	Gilmar Oprisan	2,149	4.3	+3.2
Green	Roberta Herod	620	1.2	-2.7
Total valid votes		49,995		
Total rejected ballots		385		
Turnout		50,380	49.00	
Eligible voters		102,820		
Conservative gain from Liberal		Swing		+2.0
Source: Elections Canada

2019 Canadian federal election: King—Vaughan
Party	Candidate	Votes	%	±%	Expenditures
Liberal	Deb Schulte	28,725	45.00	-2.38	$95,558.89
Conservative	Anna Roberts	27,584	43.20	-1.00	$61,976.67
New Democratic	Emilio Bernardo-Ciddio	4,297	6.70	+0.17	none listed
Green	Ann Raney	2,511	3.90	+2.00	$16,180.64
People's	Anton Strgacic	731	1.10	+1.10	$1,568.81
Total valid votes/expense limit		63,848	100.0		
Total rejected ballots		598	0.93		
Turnout		64,446	64.94		
Eligible voters		99,246			
Liberal hold		Swing		-1.38	
Source: Elections Canada
