= Above Znoneofthe =

Canadian perennial candidate (born 1969)

- Born: Sheldon Isaac Bergson; June 28, 1969 (age 57); Thornhill, Ontario
- Occupations: Politician, perennial candidate
- Years active: 1993, 2015–present
- Era: 20th-21st century
- Known for: Changing name to appear last on ballots
- Political party: National Party of Canada (1993), None of the Above Party, Rhinoceros Party (2021)

Above Znoneofthe (born Sheldon Isaac Bergson; 28 June 1969) is a Canadian politician and perennial candidate. He changed his name to "Above Znoneofthe" with a silent "Z" so that his name would be placed last on alphabetical ballots (hence reflecting the idea of voting for None of the Above).

== Biography ==
While a university student, Znoneofthe ran in the 1993 Canadian federal election as a candidate for the short-lived National Party of Canada in the Ontario riding of Markham—Whitchurch-Stouffville, earning about 1% of the vote.

Znoneofthe re-entered politics in 2015, and legally changed his name so that it would appear on electoral ballots as "Znoneofthe, Above", adding a silent Z so that his name would appear at the bottom of alphabetical-order ballots. Znoneofthe explained that his name was chosen for those who do not usually vote, telling CBC News that he thought "one of these days we should get 'none of the above' on a ballot."

He first ran under his changed name in a provincial by-election in Whitby—Oshawa on 11 February 2016; however, since Ontario electoral ballots list candidates' names with their given names first, he appeared as "Above Znoneofthe".

Later in 2016, during a by-election campaign in Ottawa—Vanier, Znoneofthe attempted to participate in a debate to which he was not invited, as a candidate under the None of the Above party. Audience members shouted for Znoneofthe and perennial candidate John Turmel, running under the Pauper Party, who was also not invited, to leave, but neither left until escorted off of the stage by police. Znoneofthe did appear last on the alphabetized list of candidates in the CBC News article describing the incident.

He has since run in several by-elections as an independent and as a member of the None of the Above Party. He contested the 2021 Canadian federal election as a member of the Rhinoceros Party, running in the riding of Papineau against Prime Minister Justin Trudeau.

== Electoral record ==
=== Federal ===
2021 Canadian federal election: Papineau
Party	Candidate	Votes	%	±%	Expenditures
Liberal	Justin Trudeau	22,848	50.30	–0.82	$82,530.41
New Democratic	Christine Paré	10,303	22.68	+3.48	$8,058.03
Bloc Québécois	Nabila Ben Youssef	6,830	15.04	–0.96	$3,928.18
Conservative	Julio Rivera	2,198	4.84	+0.6	$9,640.70
Green	Alain Lepine	1,448	3.19	–4.18	$4,443.78
People's	Christian Boutin	1,064	2.34	+1.71	$0.00
Rhinoceros	Above Znoneofthe	418	0.92	+0.21	$0.00
Marxist–Leninist	Garnet Colly	115	0.25	–	$0.00
Independent	Raymond Martin	102	0.22	–	$0.00
Independent	Béatrice Zako	97	0.21	–	$0.00
Total valid votes/expense limit		45,423	98.07	-0.12	$107,828.60
Total rejected ballots		894	1.93	+0.12	
Turnout		46,317	63.51	–3.66	
Eligible voters		72,931			
Liberal hold		Swing		–2.15	
Source: Elections Canada

Canadian federal by-election, October 26, 2020: Toronto Centre Resignation of Bill Morneau
Party	Candidate	Votes	%	±%	Expenditures
Liberal	Marci Ien	10,581	42.0	-15.4	$116,839
Green	Annamie Paul	8,250	32.7	+25.6	$100,008
New Democratic	Brian Chang	4,280	17.0	-5.3	$71,222
Conservative	Benjamin Gauri Sharma	1,435	5.7	-6.4	$0
People's	Baljit Bawa	269	1.1	–	$22,752
Libertarian	Keith Komar	135	0.5	–	
Independent	Kevin Clarke	123	0.5	–	
Free	Dwayne Cappelletti	76	0.3	–	$1,570
No affiliation	Above Znoneofthe	56	0.2	–	$0
Total valid votes		25,205	100.0	–	
Total rejected ballots		118	0.5	-0.2	
Turnout		25,323	30.9	-35.2	
Electors on lists		81,861			
Liberal hold		Swing		-20.5	
Elections Canada

=== Ontario ===
Ontario provincial by-election, February 27, 2020: Ottawa—Vanier Resignation of Nathalie Des Rosiers
Party	Candidate	Votes	%	±%
Liberal	Lucille Collard	10,404	52.22	+9.36
New Democratic	Myriam Djilane	5,031	25.25	-4.42
Progressive Conservative	Patrick Mayangi	2,329	11.69	-9.69
Green	Benjamin Koczwarski	1,709	8.58	+4.50
Independent	Julie Fiala	188	0.94	
Libertarian	Ken Lewis	129	0.65	-0.04
None of the Above	Above Znoneofthe	95	0.48	-0.38
Ontario Alliance	J. Justin O'Donnell	38	0.19	
Total valid votes		19,923	99.45%	
Total declined, rejected and unmarked ballots		110	0.55%	
Turnout			19.89	-27.33
Eligible voters		100,190		
Liberal hold		Swing		+6.89

Ontario provincial by-election, February 11, 2016: Whitby—Oshawa Resignation of Christine Elliott
Party	Candidate	Votes	%	±%
Progressive Conservative	Lorne Coe	17,053	52.92	+12.27
Liberal	Elizabeth Roy	8,865	27.51	−3.99
New Democratic	Niki Lundquist	5,172	16.05	−6.99
Green	Stacey Leadbetter	529	1.64	−2.63
None of the Above	Greg Vezina	261	0.81	–
Independent	Above Znoneofthe	140	0.43	–
Libertarian	Adam McEwan	109	0.34	–
People's Political Party	Garry Cuthbert	52	0.16	–
Freedom	Douglas Thom	34	0.11	−0.44
Pauper	John Turmel	11	0.03	–
Total valid votes		32,226	100.00	
Total rejected, unmarked and declined ballots		61	0.19	
Turnout		32,287	28.94	
Eligible voters		111,566		
Progressive Conservative hold		Swing		+8.13
Source(s) Elections Ontario (12 February 2016). "Return from the Records, 2016 By-election Whitby—Oshawa (100)" (PDF).

=== As Sheldon Bergson ===
1993 Canadian federal election: Markham—Whitchurch-Stouffville
Party	Candidate	Votes	%	±%
Liberal	Jag Bhaduria	35,909	46.50	+14.69
Progressive Conservative	Bill Attewell	19,695	25.51	-27.59
Reform	Joe Sherren	17,937	23.23	–
New Democratic	Jack Grant	1,692	2.19	-6.80
National	Sheldon Bergson	973	1.26	–
Natural Law	Stephen Porter	469	0.61	–
Independent	Paul Wang	458	0.59	–
Abolitionist	Dean Papadopoulos	85	0.11	–
Total valid votes		77,218	99.30	
Total rejected ballots		545	0.70	
Turnout		77,763	70.25	
Eligible voters		110,696		
Liberal gain from Progressive Conservative		Swing		+21.14
Sources: Canadian Elections Database, Library of Parliament
