= John McCallum =

Canadian politician (1950–2025)

The Honourable John McCallum PC
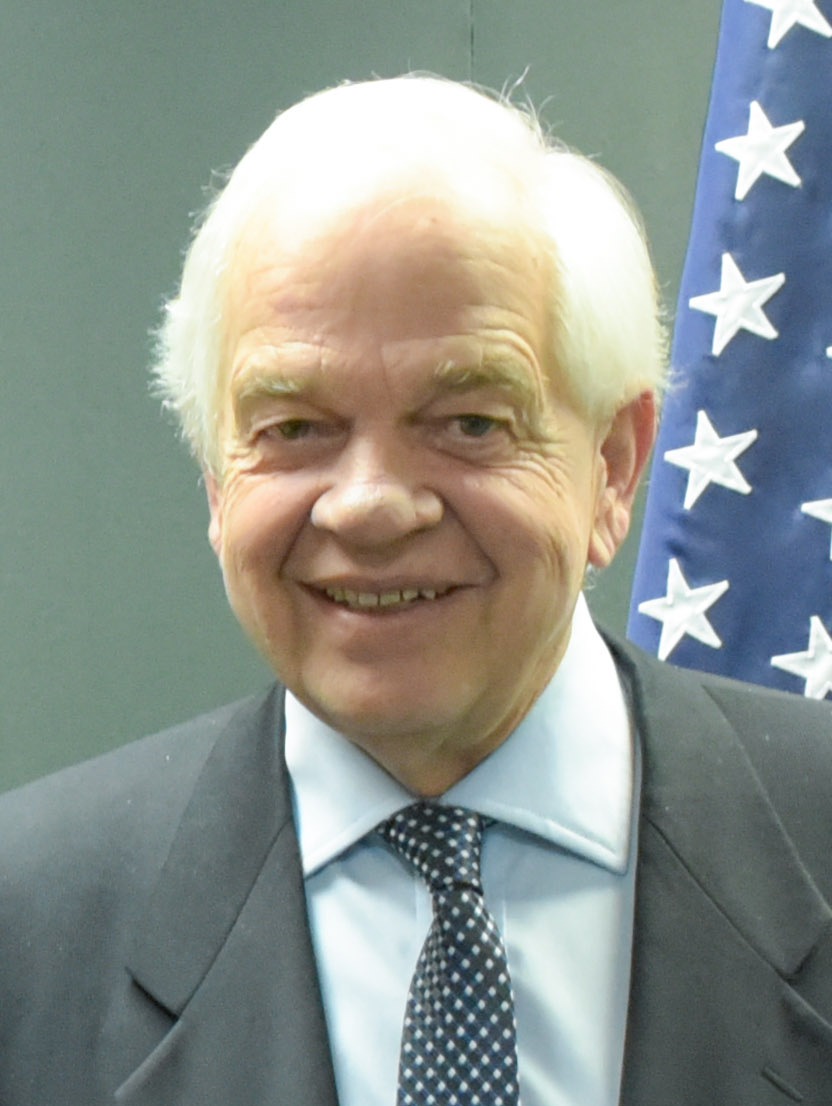
- McCallum in 2016

Canadian Ambassador to China
- In office 18 March 2017 – 26 January 2019
- Prime Minister: Justin Trudeau
- Preceded by: Guy Saint-Jacques
- Succeeded by: Dominic Barton

Minister of Immigration, Refugees and Citizenship
- In office 4 November 2015 – 10 January 2017
- Prime Minister: Justin Trudeau
- Preceded by: Chris Alexander
- Succeeded by: Ahmed Hussen

Minister of National Revenue
- In office 19 July 2004 – 5 February 2006
- Prime Minister: Paul Martin
- Preceded by: Stan Keyes
- Succeeded by: Carol Skelton

Minister of Veterans Affairs
- In office 12 December 2003 – 19 July 2004
- Prime Minister: Paul Martin
- Preceded by: Rey Pagtakhan
- Succeeded by: Albina Guarnieri

Minister of National Defence
- In office 26 May 2002 – 11 December 2003
- Prime Minister: Jean Chrétien
- Preceded by: Art Eggleton
- Succeeded by: David Pratt

Member of Parliament for Markham—Thornhill
- In office 19 October 2015 – 1 February 2017
- Preceded by: Constituency established
- Succeeded by: Mary Ng

Member of Parliament for Markham—Unionville Markham (2000–2004)
- In office 27 November 2000 – 19 October 2015
- Preceded by: Jim Jones
- Succeeded by: Bob Saroya

Personal details
- Born: 9 April 1950 Montreal, Quebec, Canada
- Died: 21 June 2025 (aged 75) Mississauga, Ontario, Canada
- Party: Liberal
- Spouse: Nancy Lim (林秀英)
- Children: 3 sons
- Education: Queens' College, Cambridge (BA); Université de Paris I (DES); McGill University (PhD)
- Profession: Economist

John McCallum Chinese name
- Simplified Chinese: 麦家廉
- Traditional Chinese: 麥家廉
- Literal meaning: Mai (Chinese surname) Home-Incorruptible
Transcriptions
Standard Mandarin
- Hanyu Pinyin: Mài Jiālián

Chinese translation of "John McCallum"
- Simplified Chinese: 约翰·麦考姆
- Traditional Chinese: 約翰·麥考姆
- Literal meaning: Yohan McCallum
Transcriptions
Standard Mandarin
- Hanyu Pinyin: Yuēhàn Màikǎomǔ

John McCallum PC (9 April 1950 – 21 June 2025) was a Canadian politician, economist, diplomat and university professor. A onetime Liberal Member of Parliament (MP), McCallum served as the Canadian Ambassador to China from 2017 until being asked to resign by Prime Minister Trudeau in 2019. As an MP, he represented the electoral district of Markham—Thornhill and had previously represented Markham—Unionville and Markham. He was a member of the Queen's Privy Council for Canada.

A veteran federal politician who began his political career in 2000, McCallum served in the governments of Liberal prime ministers Jean Chrétien, Paul Martin, and Justin Trudeau. McCallum was previously appointed Secretary of State (International Financial Institutions), Minister of National Defence, Minister of Veterans Affairs, and Minister of Immigration, Refugees and Citizenship.

== Early life and education ==
McCallum was born in Montreal, Quebec, the son of Joan (Patteson) and Alexander Campbell McCallum. He received his secondary education at Selwyn House School and Trinity College School. He held a Bachelor of Arts degree from Queens' College, Cambridge University, a diplôme d'études supérieures from Université de Paris I, and a PhD degree in economics from McGill University.

== Academic career (1976–1994) ==
McCallum spent his initial working years in Winnipeg, working as a civil servant for NDP Premier Ed Schreyer and as a professor of economics at the University of Manitoba from 1976 until 1978. He taught at Simon Fraser University from 1978 until 1982, at the Université du Québec à Montréal from 1982 until 1987, and return to McGill University in 1987. He served as McGill's dean of arts when his future boss Justin Trudeau was a student there. He was an honorary member of the Royal Military College of Canada, student No. S139.

One of his most influential academic contributions was an article in the American Economic Review, which introduced the concept of the home bias in trade puzzle. It has spawned an ongoing international debate on whether trade within a nation state is greater than trade among nations, as compared with the predictions of standard economic models.

As McGill University's dean of arts, McCallum secured a $10 million contribution from Charles Bronfman for the establishment of the McGill Institute for the Study of Canada. He also participated in the national unity debates of the early 1990s, editing the Canada Round Series of the C. D. Howe Institute and engaged in debate with then Opposition Leader Jacques Parizeau at Quebec's National Assembly. He left McGill to become senior vice-president and chief economist of the Royal Bank of Canada in 1994.

== Royal Bank of Canada's Chief Economist (1994–2000) ==
McCallum was the Royal Bank of Canada's chief economist for six years. He consistently achieved the highest media coverage of bank chief economists, making regular appearances on CBC's The National as an economics panellist. With these media appearance he developed a reputation for cogent outspokenness. His frank assessment early in his tenure attributing Canada's high unemployment to Bank of Canada tight money policy, while generally uncontentious from an academic standpoint, was noted as surprising by both mainstream and financial sector journalists.

He also engaged in social issues, notably a 1997 Royal Bank conference designed to align the business community with the recommendations of the 1996 Report on the Royal Commission on Aboriginal Peoples. His paper at that conference, "The Cost of Doing Nothing", was highlighted ten years later in the Aboriginal Times magazine.

== Parliamentary career ==
=== Member of Parliament (2000–17) ===
In the week immediately before the call of the 2000 federal election, McCallum was announced as the Liberal Party's star candidate for the electoral district of Markham, one of only two seats in Ontario (out of 103) the party failed to win in the previous election held in 1997. McCallum handily defeated the incumbent MP Jim Jones, who was elected as a Progressive Conservative but was expelled for accepting the endorsement from the rival party Canadian Alliance.

With York Region's rapid population growth, McCallum had his electoral district redistributed to and forming the majority of two successor districts twice during his parliamentary career. He was re-elected in Markham—Unionville, one of the two successor districts of Markham, in 2004, 2006, 2008 and 2011. He won the first three elections with comfortable margins, and was one of only eleven Ontario Liberal MPs who survived the 2011 election, retaining the seat in a tightly contested race against future Conservative MP Bob Saroya. His district was again divided in at the 2015 election when he was re-elected in Markham—Thornhill.

For a brief four month period in late 2001, McCallum served as a parliamentary secretary to Finance Minister and future Prime Minister Paul Martin. He was elevated to cabinet by Prime Minister Jean Chrétien in January 2002, initially as Secretary of State (International Financial Institution).

=== Minister of National Defence (2002–03) ===
Only four months into his cabinet tenure, McCallum was promoted to be Minister of National Defence in May 2002, succeeding Art Eggleton who had offered his resignation upon findings by the Prime Minister's ethics counsellor that he had breached ministerial conflict of interests guidelines.

As Defence Minister, McCallum achieved what was then the largest increase in the annual defence budget ($1 billion) in more than a decade in return for offering up $200 million in savings from reducing low priority spending. He also retroactively reversed an inequity which awarded up to $250,000 to military personnel who lost their eyesight or a limb while on active service - but only to those with the rank of colonel or above. Now all Canadian Forces members are covered by the plan regardless of rank. Working with Germany, he successfully persuaded NATO to take control over the security mission in Kabul, Afghanistan, while also ensuring that the mission was led by Canada. He also determined that the army, rather than the navy or air force, was to be the top priority in budget allocations.

He became widely known and criticized in 2002 when he admitted, while serving as the Minister of National Defence, that he had never heard of the 1942 Dieppe raid, a fateful and nationally significant operation for Canadian Forces during the Second World War. Ironically, he wrote a letter to the editor of the National Post in response, but committed a further gaffe, confusing Canadian participation in the 1917 Battle of Vimy Ridge in France with Vichy France from 1940 to 1944. Response at the continued historical ignorance prompted outrage and humour among the press.

In November 2002, while still serving as Defence Minister, McCallum encountered further controversy when officials refused to allow him to board an Air Canada flight because his breath smelt heavily of alcohol. McCallum announced soon thereafter that the incident prompted him to abstain completely from alcohol consumption. He reportedly also intended to lose weight and give up smoking.

In January 2003, McCallum suggested Canadian troops could avoid so-called "friendly fire" incidents by wearing some of female Conservative MP Elsie Wayne's clothes. McCallum later apologized both inside and outside the House of Commons for using inappropriate language, blaming the excitement of the moment, and had his apologies accepted by Wayne.

=== Veterans Affairs Minister (2003–04) & Revenue Minister (2004–06) ===
When Paul Martin became Prime Minister in late 2003, McCallum was among the eight members of the outgoing Chretien cabinet who stayed on. He was however shuffled to the lower profile role of Minister of Veterans Affairs. As Veterans Affairs Minister, McCallum introduced a new charter for younger, postwar veterans who have been physically or mentally injured while serving in the Canadian Forces. This charter, which became law in 2005, is modelled on the range of services provided for returning veterans after World War II. This "new model" stripped veterans of a monthly pension opting for a lump sum payment.

Following the 2004 election which reduced the Liberal government to minority, McCallum was further reassigned to be Minister of National Revenue and Minister responsible for Canada Post. During this period, he was a member of the Treasury Board and chaired its Expenditure Review Sub-Committee, where he achieved in 2005 expenditure reductions of $11 billion over the next five years. McCallum took on additional responsibility acting natural resources minister in the month leading up to the 2006 election when incumbent Minister John Efford was in ill health.

=== Opposition Years (2006–15) ===
With the Liberals' defeated in the 2006 federal election, McCallum took a prominent seat on the opposition front bench as finance critic under interim leader Bill Graham. Despite being an early supporter of Michael Ignatieff's unsuccessful 2006 leadership bid, McCallum retained his role as finance critic under Stéphane Dion and later under Ignatieff. He also served as transport critic for a period under Ignatieff.

The Liberals suffered its worst electoral defeat in the 2011 election, when its caucus was reduced to third party status. In the substantially reduced caucus under interim leader Bob Rae, McCallum served simultaneously as critic to three ministers - Treasury Board, Public Works & Government Services, and Human Resources and Skills Development.

Upon Justin Trudeau's election as Liberal leader, McCallum was appointed as the immigration critic. During his time in the opposition, McCallum began to travel extensively to China at the expense of Beijing-friendly groups. McCallum took trips valued at $73,300 from pro-Beijing business groups, such as the Canadian Confederation of Fujian Associations.

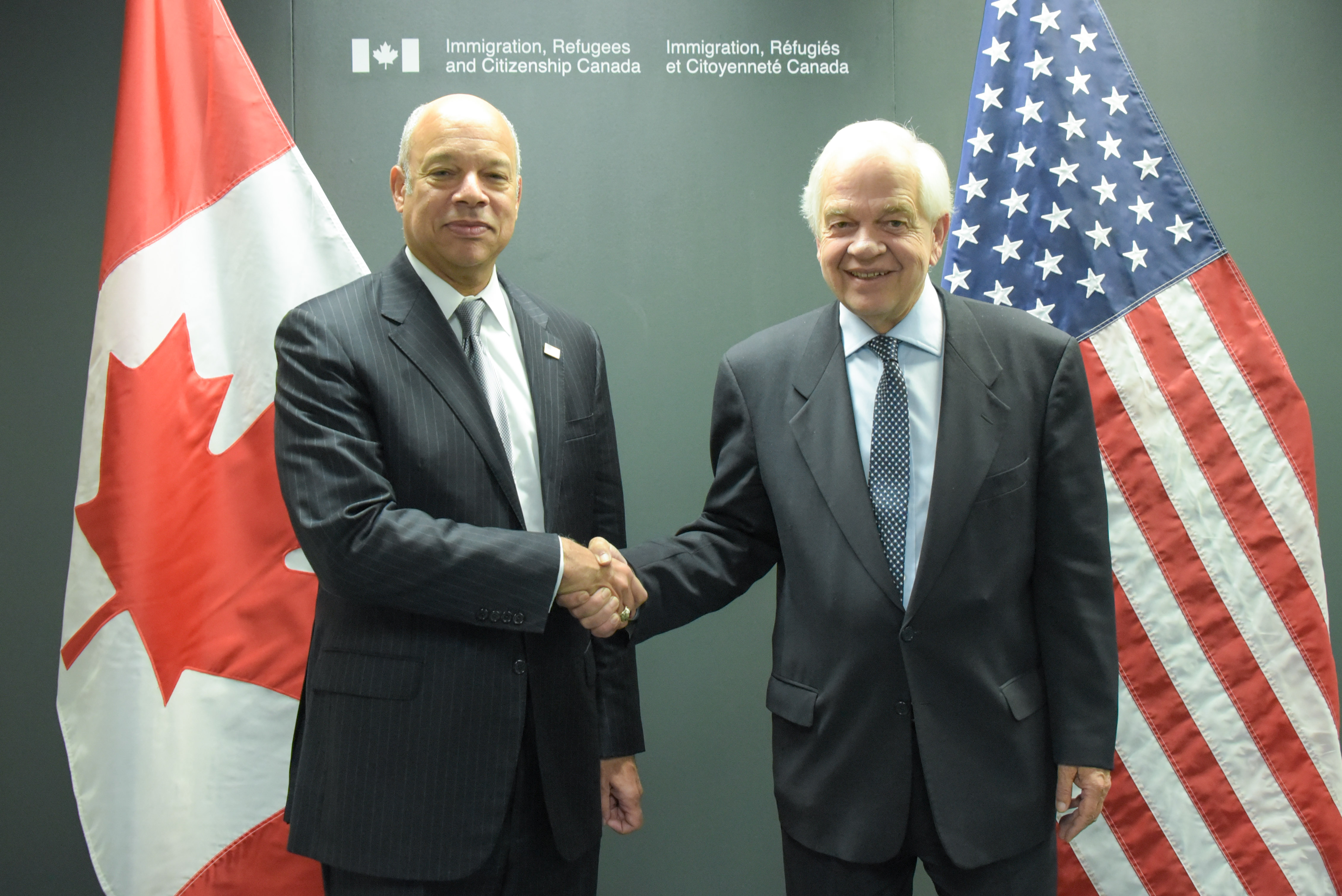
McCallum meets with U.S. Secretary of Homeland Security Jeh Johnson in Ottawa on 27 October 2016.

=== Minister of Immigration, Refugees and Citizenship (2015–17) ===
When the Liberals were returned to power in November 2015, McCallum was appointed Minister of Immigration, Refugees and Citizenship in the 29th Canadian Ministry of Justin Trudeau. He was one of six members of the new cabinet with previous cabinet experience, and was listed in an order-in-council as the fourth-in-line to act in the event of the prime minister being unable to perform his duty, reflecting his standing as the cabinet members with the fourth longest tenure as a member of the Queen's Privy Council. As Immigration Minister, he oversaw the intake of Syrian refugees during the Syrian refugee crisis.

=== Notable stances ===
McCallum successfully nominated Nelson Mandela as the second honorary citizen in Canadian history.

McCallum was quite vocal in Canada's debate on same-sex marriage. He told the Edmonton Sun in August 2003, "If people want to do something and it doesn't hurt other people, doesn't reduce other people's rights, we should let them do it. Why not?" He also significantly contributed to the final debate before the vote on same-sex marriage on 21 March 2005 saying:

I believe we should always seek to expand the rights of our fellow citizens as long as we do not thereby reduce the rights of others. We should seek to ensure that no group is denied full participation in society. As members of Parliament, we should not ask the question, why should we extend this right? Rather our question should be, why should we not extend the right? Let the burden of proof be on those who wish to limit fundamental rights.

...

Many Canadians will want to accept both of these principles: protect the traditional definition of marriage and protect the rights of minorities. The essence of my message today is that we cannot do both. We cannot have it both ways. We must make a choice between traditional marriage and the protection of minority rights.

== Ambassador to the People's Republic of China (2017–19) ==
On 10 January 2017, it was announced that McCallum and foreign minister Stéphane Dion would step down from cabinet, respectively to become Canada's Ambassadors to the People's Republic of China and to the European Union.

McCallum expressed eagerness to take on the posting in Beijing, citing his strong personal connections to China, as his former riding Markham has primarily Chinese constituents and both his wife and children are of Chinese ethnicity.

On 23 January 2019, McCallum spoke to Canadian and state-owned Chinese media in Markham, Ontario, concerning the detention and extradition request by the United States, which resulted in the arrest of Huawei deputy chairwoman Meng Wanzhou, who was awaiting court judgement. The United States alleged that Meng Wanzhou was in violation of the United States sanctions against Iran. The Canadian Federal government reaffirmed that it is obliged to follow judicial protocol and that the arrest was not political in nature. McCallum shared his thoughts with the media by restating public facts that could make Meng's legal defence case strong against this extradition request. This included President Donald Trump's political intrusion, which allegedly undermined the integrity of the Canadian judicial protocol, thereby contradicting Canada's stance by making it political in nature. McCallum re-stated other reported motives the United States could have, citing the alleged intent of the arrest by the United States was to attempt to obtain trade concessions from China. McCallum withdrew his comments, saying he "misspoke" and that they did "not accurately represent [his] position on this issue". That week, McCallum was further quoted as later telling a Toronto Star journalist it "would be great for Canada" if the U.S. extradition request were dropped, conditional on release of Canadians since detained in China.

On 26 January 2019, McCallum submitted his resignation as ambassador to China at the request of Prime Minister Justin Trudeau, who did not disclose the reasoning behind this decision.

== Post public offices (2019 onward) ==
McCallum advised and represented various private enterprises engaging in business dealing in China in later years. He was affiliated with law firm McMillan LLP, where Martin era PMO Chief of Staff Tim Murphy was managing partner.

In July 2020, McCallum's employment by the Wailian Group, a Chinese company that assists with immigration to Canada, sparked calls from oppositions MPs and Democracy Watch for McCallum to be investigated by the Ethics Commissioner for potential breaches of the Conflict of Interest Act.

== Personal life and death ==
McCallum was married to Nancy Lim, who is of Malaysian Chinese background (Chinese: 林秀英; pinyin: Lín Xiùyīng). They have three sons (Andrew, Jamie, and Duncan).

McCallum died at Credit Valley Hospital in Mississauga, Ontario, on 21 June 2025, at the age of 75. The cause of death was lung cancer.

== Electoral record ==
2015 Canadian federal election: Markham—Thornhill
Party	Candidate	Votes	%	±%	Expenditures
Liberal	John McCallum	23,878	55.72	+18.61	$78,406.90
Conservative	Jobson Easow	13,849	32.31	−4.08	$128,323.59
New Democratic	Senthi Chelliah	4,595	10.72	−12.67	$48,598.52
Green	Joshua Russell	535	1.25	−1.37	–
Total valid votes/Expense limit		42,857	100.00		$203,953.81
Total rejected ballots		240	0.56	–	
Turnout		43,097	61.14	–	
Eligible voters		70,484			
Liberal notional hold		Swing		+11.34	
Source: Elections Canada

2011 Canadian federal election: Markham—Unionville
Party	Candidate	Votes	%	±%	Expenditures
Liberal	John McCallum	19,429	38.9	−16.0	
Conservative	Bob Saroya	17,734	35.5	+5.3	
New Democratic	Nadine Hawkins	10,897	21.8	+11.6	
Green	Adam Poon	1,597	3.2	−1.0	
Libertarian	Allen Small	231	0.5	–	
Total valid votes		49,888	100.0		
Total rejected ballots		290	0.6	–	
Turnout		50,178	55.1	+2.8	
Eligible voters		91,057	–	–	
Liberal hold		Swing		−10.65	

2008 Canadian federal election: Markham—Unionville
Party	Candidate	Votes	%	±%	Expenditures
Liberal	John McCallum	25,195	54.9	−6.7	$58,875
Conservative	Duncan Fletcher	13,855	30.2	+3.2	$58,523
New Democratic	Nadine Hawkins	4,682	10.2	+2.2	$4,250
Green	Leonard Aitken	1,931	4.2	+2.0	$2,524
Libertarian	Allen Small	229	0.5	N/A	$348
Total valid votes/Expense limit		45,892	100.0	$90,945	
Turnout		–	52.31		
Liberal hold		Swing		−4.95	

2006 Canadian federal election: Markham—Unionville
Party	Candidate	Votes	%	±%
Liberal	John McCallum	32,797	61.6	−4.7
Conservative	Joe Li	14,357	27.0	+4.5
New Democratic	Janice Hagan	4,266	8.0	−0.7
Green	Wesley Weese	1,151	2.2	−0.3
Progressive Canadian	Fayaz Choudhary	363	0.7	
Independent	Partap Dua	297	0.6	
Total valid votes		53,231	100.0	
Liberal hold		Swing		−4.6

2004 Canadian federal election: Markham—Unionville
Party	Candidate	Votes	%
Liberal	John McCallum	30,442	66.3
Conservative	Joe Li	10,325	22.5
New Democratic	Janice Hagan	3,993	8.7
Green	Ed Wong	1,148	2.5
Total valid votes		45,908	100.0

2000 Canadian federal election: Markham
Party	Candidate	Votes	%	±%
Liberal	John McCallum	32,104	66.6	+29.9
Alliance	Jim Jones	9,015	18.7	+7.9
Progressive Conservative	David Scrymgeour	5,085	10.6	−34.1
New Democratic	Janice Hagan	1,129	2.3	−0.9
Green	Bernadette Manning	493	1.0	–
Independent	Akber Choudhry	222	0.5	–
Canadian Action	Jim Conrad	130	0.3	−0.2
Total valid votes		48,178	100.0	
Liberal gain from Progressive Conservative		Swing		+32.0

== Bibliography ==
- — (1980). Unequal Beginnings: Agriculture and Economic Development in Quebec and Ontario until 1870. Toronto, Ontario: University of Toronto Press. ISBN 0-8020-5455-2.
- Barber, Clarence; — (1980). Unemployment and Inflation: The Canadian Experience. Canadian Institute for Economic Policy. Toronto, Ontario: James Lorimer Limited. ISBN 0-88862-293-7.
- Barber, Clarence; — (1982). Controlling Inflation: Learning from Experience in Canada, Europe and Japan. Canadian Institute for Economic Policy. Toronto, Ontario: James Lorimer Limited. ISBN 0-88862-587-1.
- —; Green, Christopher (1991). Parting as Friends: The Economic Consequences for Quebec. Canada Round. Toronto, Ontario: C. D. Howe Institute. ISBN 0-88806289-3. ISSN 1183-6253.
- Baldassarri, Mario; McCallum, John; Mundell, Robert, eds. (1992). Global Disequilibrium in the World Economy. Central Issues in Contemporary Economic Theory and Policy. Palgrave Macmillan. ISBN 0-31207984-2.

Government offices
26th Canadian Ministry (1993–2003) – Cabinet of Jean Chrétien
Cabinet post (1)
Predecessor	Office	Successor
Art Eggleton	Minister of National Defence; 2002–2003	David Pratt
Sub-Cabinet Post
Predecessor	Title	Successor
Jim Peterson	Secretary of State (International Financial Institutions) (2002)	Maurizio Bevilacqua
27th Canadian Ministry (2003–2006) – Cabinet of Paul Martin
Cabinet posts (2)
Predecessor	Office	Successor
Rey Pagtakhan	Minister of Veterans Affairs; 2003–2004	Albina Guarnieri
Stan Keyes	Minister of National Revenue; 2004–2006	Carol Skelton
29th Canadian Ministry (2015–2025) – Cabinet of Justin Trudeau
Cabinet post (1)
Predecessor	Office	Successor
Chris Alexander	Minister of Immigration, Refugees and Citizenship; 2015–2017	Ahmed Hussen
Diplomatic posts
Preceded by Guy Saint-Jacques	Ambassador Extraordinary and Plenipotentiary to the People's Republic of China; 2017–2019	Succeeded by Jim Nickel (chargé d'affaires)
