= Jim Jones (Canadian politician) =

Canadian politician

York Regional Councillor (Markham)
- Incumbent
- Assumed office 2003
- Preceded by: Tony Wong

Member of Parliament for Markham
- In office 1997–2000
- Preceded by: Jag Bhaduria
- Succeeded by: John McCallum

Markham Town Councillor
- In office 1988–1997
- Succeeded by: Joseph Virgillo

Personal details
- Born: February 4, 1943 (age 83) Warwick, Ontario
- Party: Progressive Conservative; Canadian Alliance
- Education: Ryerson Polytechnical Institute
- Profession: Accountant

H. James Jones (born February 4, 1943) is a Canadian politician. He served in the House of Commons of Canada from 1997 to 2000, initially as a Progressive Conservative and later as a member of the Canadian Alliance. He was later succeeded by former Minister of National Defence John McCallum.

== Background ==
Jones was born in Warwick, Ontario, and received a degree in Business Administration from Ryerson Polytechnical Institute in 1967. He became a Certified General Accountant in 1971. Jones was an internal auditor of the Moore Corporation from 1967 to 1969, and a Marketing Manager at IBM Canada Ltd. from 1969 to 1997.

In 2007 Jones pleaded guilty to assaulting a maid at a hotel in Niagara-on-the-Lake, citing a momentary lapse in judgement. He had originally been charged with sexual assault following the incident. He received a conditional discharge and was sentenced to 12 months probation and 20 hours of community service.

== Politics ==
He began his political career at the municipal level, serving as a councillor in Markham's third ward from 1988 to 1997.

He was elected to the Canadian House of Commons in the 1997 federal election, defeating Liberal candidate Gobinder Randhawa by 3,639 votes in Markham. Jones was the only Progressive Conservative candidate elected in Ontario in this election, and some credited his win to local dissatisfaction over the previous Member of Parliament (MP), Jag Bhaduria. Bhaduria had been elected as a Liberal, but resigned from the party amid controversy soon after the election.

Jones was on the right wing of the Progressive Conservative Party. He initially supported Brian Pallister in the first round of the PC Party's 1998 leadership election, though he later endorsed Joe Clark on the second ballot before Pallister officially withdrew. He later became a supporter of the United Alternative movement, and in 2000 floated the idea of seeking re-election with co-endorsements from the Progressive Conservatives and the newly formed Canadian Alliance, a successor to the Reform Party.

Jones's proposal was rejected by the Progressive Conservative leadership, and he was thrown out of the party's caucus on July 4, 2000. Referring to the situation, Joe Clark was quoted as saying, "You can't play for two teams at the same time." He joined the Canadian Alliance on September 6.

Jones ultimately sought re-election in the 2000 campaign as a Canadian Alliance candidate, while David Scrymgeour was given the Progressive Conservative nomination. Both Jones and Scrymgeour lost to Liberal candidate John McCallum.

Jones later returned to municipal politics, and was elected as a regional councillor in Markham in 2003. He was re-elected in the November 2006 election, receiving the most votes of all regional councillor candidates, thereby becoming Markham's deputy mayor.

On November 7, 2016, Jim Jones proposed amalgamating Markham, Vaughan, Richmond Hill, and part of King and Stouffville into one city. If amalgamated, it would be larger than Mississauga and a population of around 1 million people.
