= Independent Liberal =

Political affiliation

Independent Liberal is a description which candidates and politicians have used to describe themselves, designating them as liberals, yet independent of the official Liberal Party of their country. To avoid confusion with the Liberal Party of Canada, the Liberal Party of the United Kingdom, and the New Zealand Liberal Party, the description can no longer be used for election purposes, but is still available in Australia.

== Australia ==
In Australia, an Independent Liberal is a member of the Liberal Party of Australia (the major centre-right, liberal conservative party in Australia) who is either running in an election as an independent or who sits in a legislature as an independent.

== Canada ==
Independent Liberal Members of Parliament (or of the Canadian Senate or a provincial legislative assembly) are typically former Liberal caucus members who were either expelled from the Liberal Party caucus or resigned the whip due to a political disagreement. More recent examples include Don Johnston, who sat as an Independent Liberal from January 18, 1988 until the adjournment of parliament for the 1988 federal election due to his resignation from the Liberal caucus as a result of his support of the Canada–United States Free Trade Agreement which the party opposed; Jag Bhaduria, who sat as an Independent Liberal from 1994 to 1996 following his expulsion from the Liberal caucus; and Dennis Mills, who briefly left the Liberal caucus in 1996 to sit as an Independent Liberal to protest the Liberal government's failure to abolish the Goods and Services Tax (GST).

Independent Liberal candidates for parliament or the legislature have been those who generally subscribe to Liberal Party principles but either have not been selected as an official Liberal Party candidate or decline to seek the party's nomination due to a disagreement with the party on certain issues. Under the current Canada Elections Act a candidate who is not affiliated with a political party can only describe themselves on the ballot as Independent or "No Affiliation" and cannot describe themselves in terms of an existing political party. Accordingly, no candidate for the House of Commons of Canada has officially styled themselves as an "Independent Liberal" since the 1968 federal election and no Independent Liberal candidate has been elected to the House of Commons since the 1957 federal election.

A number of Quebec Liberal MPs left the party and sat as Independent Liberals as a result of the Conscription Crisis of 1944 as they opposed the Liberal government's decision to implement conscription. The most prominent of these was Charles Gavan Power, who resigned from Cabinet following the government's decision to send conscripts overseas. Several ran for re-election in the 1945 federal election as Independent Liberals. William Lyon Mackenzie King's government was returned with only a minority of Liberal MPs but governed, for practical purposes, as a majority government with the support of Independent Liberal MPs, most of whom rejoined the party during the parliament.

== New Zealand ==
Independent Liberal was a definition in New Zealand politics in the late 19th and early 20th Centuries for Independents that aligned themselves with the New Zealand Liberal Party. It is often difficult to determine whether candidates were official Liberal or Independent Liberal and many electorates had more Liberal candidates standing than seats available. From 1893 to 1908 the New Zealand Liberal Party was the only formalised political party to win any seats in parliament.

== Philippines ==
In the Philippines, independent Liberal, or denoted as "Liberal (independent)" on candidate lists, refers to politicians who had aligned themselves with the Liberal Party, but did not win its nomination or ran under its label. A candidate using this designation won 1 seat in the 1965 House elections. This was used during the Third Philippine Republic, which had a two-party system. In the current Fifth Republic and under the multi-party system, candidates are no longer identified by this manner.

== United Kingdom ==
Independent Liberal is a description once used in British politics to denote a form of non-party affiliation. It was used to designate a politician as a liberal who was independent of any political party, particularly of the Liberal Party before its transformation in the 1980s into the Liberal Democrats.

Since the Registration of Political Parties Act 1998 came into force, a candidate for election can no longer be described as an "Independent Liberal" on a ballot paper, as the 1998 Act prohibits any description which could cause confusion with a registered political party. In practice, the description used is either the name of a registered party or the word "Independent".
