= John A. Gamble =

Canadian politician (1933–2009)

Member of Parliament for York North
- In office May 22, 1979 – September 3, 1984
- Preceded by: Barney Danson
- Succeeded by: Tony Roman

Personal details
- Born: John Albert Gamble; November 24, 1933 Perth, Ontario, Canada
- Died: May 11, 2009 (aged 75) Markham, Ontario, Canada
- Party: Progressive Conservative 1979–1988 independent 1988–1993; Reform Party 1993
- Spouse: Katie Gamble
- Profession: Tax lawyer

John Albert Gamble QC, LLB (November 24, 1933 – May 11, 2009) was a Canadian politician. He served in the House of Commons of Canada as a Progressive Conservative from 1979 until 1984.

== Personal ==
Gamble was born in Perth. He worked as a tax lawyer before his political career and was director of the Unionville Home Society. He died in 2009 from leukaemia in Markham.

== Political ==
Gamble became a Member of Parliament after his victory in the 1979 federal election defeating then Liberal incumbent Member of Parliament, Barney Danson, and re-elected in 1980, representing the riding of York North.

He had a rocky relationship with PC leader Joe Clark. He was a candidate to succeed Clark at the 1983 Progressive Conservative leadership convention, but won only seventeen votes on the first ballot, placing seventh out of eight candidates, and was eliminated. Gamble was known for his extreme anti-communist views. He became so unpopular that he was one of only two Progressive Conservative MPs to lose their seat in the 1984 general election, which produced a Progressive Conservative landslide, one of the largest majorities in the history of the Canadian House of Commons. (Bill Clarke of Vancouver Quadra was the other; he lost to Prime Minister John Turner, who needed a seat in the House.) Gamble lost to independent candidate Tony Roman, who won support from Liberals dissatisfied with their candidate and Tories who wanted to defeat Gamble.

After failing to win the Progressive Conservative nomination for the new riding of Markham, Gamble ran without affiliation in the 1988 election in that district. He received less than five percent of the vote and came in a distant fourth place, behind Progressive Conservative candidate Bill Attewell. On May 31, 1993, Gamble won the Reform Party's nomination in Don Valley West for the 1993 federal election, but was expelled by the party (Gamble was replaced by Julian Pope, who lost to John Godfrey) prior to the election because of his links to far-right extremists such as Paul Fromm, Ron Gostick, Wolfgang Droege, and the Heritage Front.

In the 1980s, Gamble was involved with the hard-right World Anti-Communist League as head of its affiliate the "Canadian Freedom Foundation". According to a report by the Security Intelligence Review Committee, Paul Fromm assisted Gamble in this WACL work. Gamble was later accused of having a role in the diversion of Iran arms profits to the Contras.

== Electoral record ==
1979 Canadian federal election: York North
Party	Candidate	Votes
Progressive Conservative	John A. Gamble	29,011
Liberal	Barney Danson	21,990
New Democratic	Bruce Searle	7,591
Libertarian	Dan Davidson	430
Independent	Neil Katzman	279
Marxist–Leninist	Paul Herman	37

1980 Canadian federal election: York North
Party	Candidate	Votes
Progressive Conservative	John A. Gamble	26,039
Liberal	Jan Poot	24,281
New Democratic	Bruce Searle	8,933
Libertarian	Dan Davidson	538
Marxist–Leninist	Jamie Reid	55
lop.parl.ca

1984 Canadian federal election: York North
Party	Candidate	Votes
Independent	Tony Roman	32,200
Progressive Conservative	John A. Gamble	27,955
Liberal	Aldo Tollis	18,034
New Democratic	Doris Schwar	10,077

1988 Canadian federal election: Markham
Party	Candidate	Votes	%
Progressive Conservative	Bill Attewell	36,673	53.10
Liberal	Jag Bhaduria	21,973	31.81
New Democratic	Susan Krone	6,209	8.99
No affiliation	John A. Gamble	3,643	5.27
Libertarian	Ian Hutchison	568	0.82
Total valid votes		69,066	
Sources: Canadian Elections Database, Library of Parliament

== Archives ==
There is a John Albert Gamble fonds at Library and Archives Canada. Archival reference number is R3936.
