= Bryon Wilfert =

Canadian politician

The Honourable Bryon Wilfert PC
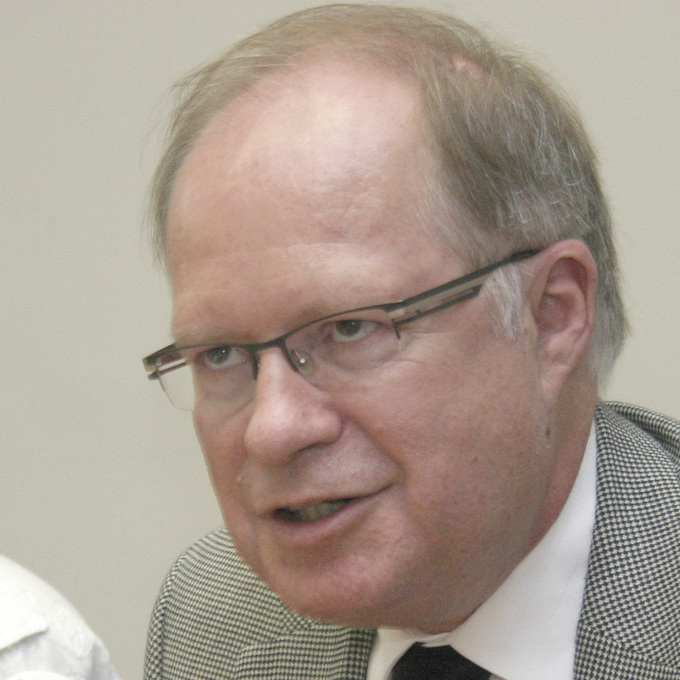

Member of Parliament for Richmond Hill Oak Ridges 1997–2004
- In office September 22, 1997 – March 26, 2011
- Preceded by: Constituency established
- Succeeded by: Costas Menegakis

Personal details
- Born: July 14, 1952 (age 74) Toronto, Ontario, Canada
- Party: Liberal
- Spouse: Elizabeth Wilfert
- Profession: Teacher

Bryon J. Wilfert PC (born July 14, 1952) is a Canadian former politician. He was a Liberal member of the House of Commons of Canada from 1997 to 2011 who represented the GTA riding of Richmond Hill until his defeat during the 2011 federal election.

== Background ==
Wilfert has Bachelor of Arts, Bachelor of Education, and Master of Arts degrees from the University of Toronto, as well as a degree in public administration from St. Lawrence College in Kingston. In June 2011, he was awarded the Order of the Rising Sun, Gold and Silver Star, Japan's second highest honour, by Emperor Akihito.

== Politics ==
=== Federal politics ===
Wilfert was elected to the House of Commons in the 1997 federal election, scoring an easy victory in the Greater Toronto Area riding of Oak Ridges. He was re-elected by an increased majority in the election of 2000, and won another easy victory in his new riding in the 2004 election. In the 2011 election, he was defeated by Conservative Party candidate Costas Menegakis by 4,407 votes.

Wilfert served as Parliamentary Secretary to the Minister of Finance in 2002–03 and was named Parliamentary Secretary to the Minister of the Environment after the 2004 election. During the 40th Parliament, 2nd Session and 3rd Session, Wilfert introduced two private members bills in 2009 and 2011, which both failed to pass beyond the first of seven stages known as "Introduction and First Reading".

After the election in 2006, Wilfert was appointed as official opposition critic of Foreign Affairs (Asia-Pacific).

Wilfert was the Caucus Liaison in the successful 2006 Liberal leadership bid by Stéphane Dion and previously served as his parliamentary secretary during his tenure as Minister of the Environment.
