= Jag Bhaduria =

Canadian teacher and politician

Member of Parliament for Markham—Whitchurch-Stouffville
- In office October 25, 1993 – June 2, 1997
- Preceded by: Bill Attewell
- Succeeded by: Jim Jones

Personal details
- Born: January 23, 1940 (age 86) New Delhi, Punjab Province British India
- Party: Liberal 1993–1994; Independent Liberal 1994–1997
- Occupation: Teacher
- Profession: Teacher

Jagdish Singh (Jag) Bhaduria (also variously spelled Badauria or Bhadauria) (born January 23, 1940, in New Delhi, India) is an Indian-Canadian teacher. He served as the Member of Parliament for the Ontario riding of Markham—Whitchurch-Stouffville in the 35th Parliament of Canada, from 1993 to 1997.

Bhaduria was nominated as the Liberal candidate in the riding of Markham and contested the 1988 federal election, placing a distant second to Progressive Conservative incumbent Bill Attewell. In the 1993 election their fortunes reversed, with Bhaduria defeating Attewell by a nearly two to one margin.

In early 1994 a series of controversies emerged, including that he had falsified his educational credentials by using postnominal letters which appeared to indicate he held a law degree, and that he had written threatening letters to his school board after being turned down for promotions. He denied that he had lied about his education and apologized for the letters. However, the controversies led to him leaving the Liberal caucus. After he declined to give up his seat in Parliament, the Reform Party led a petition drive to have his seat vacated, which was unsuccessful. He served the remainder of his term as an Independent Liberal.

He ran as an independent in the 1997 election, earning less than 4% of the vote.

== Parliamentary history and controversies ==
Bhaduria won the contest to be the Liberal candidate for Markham prior to the 1988 federal election, defeating retired accountant David Wishart for the nomination. He was defeated in the election by Progressive Conservative incumbent Bill Attewell, losing by nearly 15,000 votes.

Prior to the 1993 election, Bhaduria again contested the nomination in the riding which had been renamed Markham—Whitchurch-Stouffville, defeating challenger Mario Racco. As nationwide support for the Progressive Conservatives collapsed to its worst performance in the party's history, Bhaduria this time easily defeated Attewell, winning the riding by a margin of nearly 16,000 votes. He was among the first South Asians elected to the House of Commons, along with Herb Dhaliwal and Gurbax Singh Malhi, all Liberals.

=== Threatening letter ===
On January 21, 1994, the Toronto Sun published an article quoting from a threatening letter allegedly written by Bhaduria while he was a teacher with the Toronto Board of Education. The Sun alleged that Bhaduria sent the letter to Board executives in 1989 after being turned down for a series of vice principal positions. In the letter, Bhaduria allegedly referred to Marc Lépine, the shooter who murdered fourteen young women in the École Polytechnique massacre just a few days before, saying he wished that Lépine had shot the Board executives too. He had been fired from his teaching position over the incident on August 31, 1990.

On January 24, 1994, Bhaduria apologized in the House of Commons, and indicated that he had written letters of apology to the Board executives in 1990. Liberal Prime Minister Jean Chrétien accepted his apology.

=== False credentials ===
Days following his apology over the threatening letter, an investigation by CBC Prime Time News revealed discrepancies in Bhaduria's educational credentials. Bhaduria claimed on his resumé to hold a degree of "LLB (Int.)" from the University of London, which was understood to mean a Bachelor of Laws degree in international law. Bhaduria claimed that the initials instead referred to "intermediate", stating that he held a certification of intermediate completion from the university in 1976 but did not hold a law degree, and insisted that he never claimed to be a lawyer. However, the University reported that it did not grant such a certification, and that Bhaduria had withdrawn from the program.

Bhaduria officially resigned from the Liberal caucus on January 27, 1994. On February 15, he spoke in the House of Commons, denying the allegations that he had lied about his credentials or practiced law without qualification, and asked Speaker Gilbert Parent to rule on whether he could continue to sit as a Member of Parliament. On February 23, Parent declined to issue a ruling.

=== Nomination irregularities ===
Shortly after he resigned from the Liberal Party, Toronto newsmagazine Eye Weekly published a report on irregularities found in Bhaduria's 1993 nomination papers. Elections Canada requires potential candidates to collect 100 signatures from eligible voters in the riding where they intend to run, however the report found that the list of Liberal Party members who signed Bhaduria's nomination forms included ineligible voters, members listed with incorrect addresses, and members who either were not aware that they were members of the Party or had not paid their membership fees. Nomination candidate Don Gracey also alleged that Bhaduria had submitted forms supporting his own nomination signed by members who thought they were supporting Gracey's.

=== Petition for recall ===
The series of controversies led to calls for Bhaduria to resign from Parliament. Eye Weekly quoted Milton Mowbray, President of the Liberal Party for Ontario, explaining that the Party had no power to remove Bhaduria as he had already been elected. The Reform Party seized on the opportunity to call for recall legislation for Canadian politicians. Deputy leader Deborah Grey held a rally in Markham calling for Bhaduria's resignation, and the Reform Party's only MP from Ontario, Ed Holder, submitted a petition to Parliament with 30,000 signatures calling for Bhaduria to be removed from his seat. However, while Parliament can declare a seat vacant and call for a by-election, it had only been done four times in Canadian history, and only for cases of severe misconduct or criminal offences. (Note: Parliament has expelled members from the House of Commons four times: 1. Independent MP Louis Riel's seat in Provencher was vacated in 1874, as he was charged with treason and was evading arrest.; 2. Riel won the ensuing by-election, and was expelled a second time in 1875.; 3. Liberal-Conservative MP Thomas McGreevy's Quebec West seat was vacated in 1891 for corruption. He was re-elected in 1895.; 4. Labor-Progressive MP Fred Rose's seat in Cartier was vacated in 1947 after Rose was found guilty of providing state secrets to the Soviet Union.) Bhaduria declined to resign, and served the rest of his term as an Independent Liberal.

=== 1997 election ===
Bhaduria ran as an independent in the 1997 election, losing badly to Progressive Conservative Jim Jones with under 4% of the vote, while newly-nominated Liberal candidate Gobinder Randhawa finished second with nearly 37%. Their again-renamed riding of Markham was the only one of Ontario's 103 ridings which did not elect a Liberal, other than York South—Weston where incumbent John Nunziata had been expelled from the Liberal caucus a year earlier and won re-election as an independent.

Bhaduria later sued Chrétien and the Liberal Party for $38 million.

== Electoral record ==
1997 Canadian federal election: Markham
Party	Candidate	Votes	%	±%
Progressive Conservative	Jim Jones	20,449	44.70	+19.19
Liberal	Gobinder Randhawa	16,810	36.74	-9.76
Reform	John Paloc	4,947	10.81	-12.42
Independent	Jag Bhaduria	1,584	3.46	–
New Democratic	Bhanu Gaunt	1,482	3.24	+1.05
Natural Law	Stephen Porter	258	0.56	-0.05
Canadian Action	Jeff Baulch	218	0.48	–
Total valid votes		45,748	99.16	
Total rejected ballots		387	0.84	
Turnout		46,135	67.48	
Eligible voters		68,366		
Progressive Conservative gain from Independent		Swing		+14.48
Sources: Canadian Elections Database, Library of Parliament

1993 Canadian federal election: Markham—Whitchurch-Stouffville
Party	Candidate	Votes	%	±%
Liberal	Jag Bhaduria	35,909	46.50	+14.69
Progressive Conservative	Bill Attewell	19,695	25.51	-27.59
Reform	Joe Sherren	17,937	23.23	–
New Democratic	Jack Grant	1,692	2.19	-6.80
National	Sheldon Bergson	973	1.26	–
Natural Law	Stephen Porter	469	0.61	–
Independent	Paul Wang	458	0.59	–
Abolitionist	Dean Papadopoulos	85	0.11	–
Total valid votes		77,218	99.30	
Total rejected ballots		545	0.70	
Turnout		77,763	70.25	
Eligible voters		110,696		
Liberal gain from Progressive Conservative		Swing		+21.14
Sources: Canadian Elections Database, Library of Parliament

1988 Canadian federal election: Markham
Party	Candidate	Votes	%
Progressive Conservative	Bill Attewell	36,673	53.10
Liberal	Jag Bhaduria	21,973	31.81
New Democratic	Susan Krone	6,209	8.99
No affiliation	John A. Gamble	3,643	5.27
Libertarian	Ian Hutchison	568	0.82
Total valid votes		69,066	
Sources: Canadian Elections Database, Library of Parliament
