= Oak Ridges—Markham (federal electoral district) =

Former federal electoral district in Ontario, Canada

Ontario electoral district
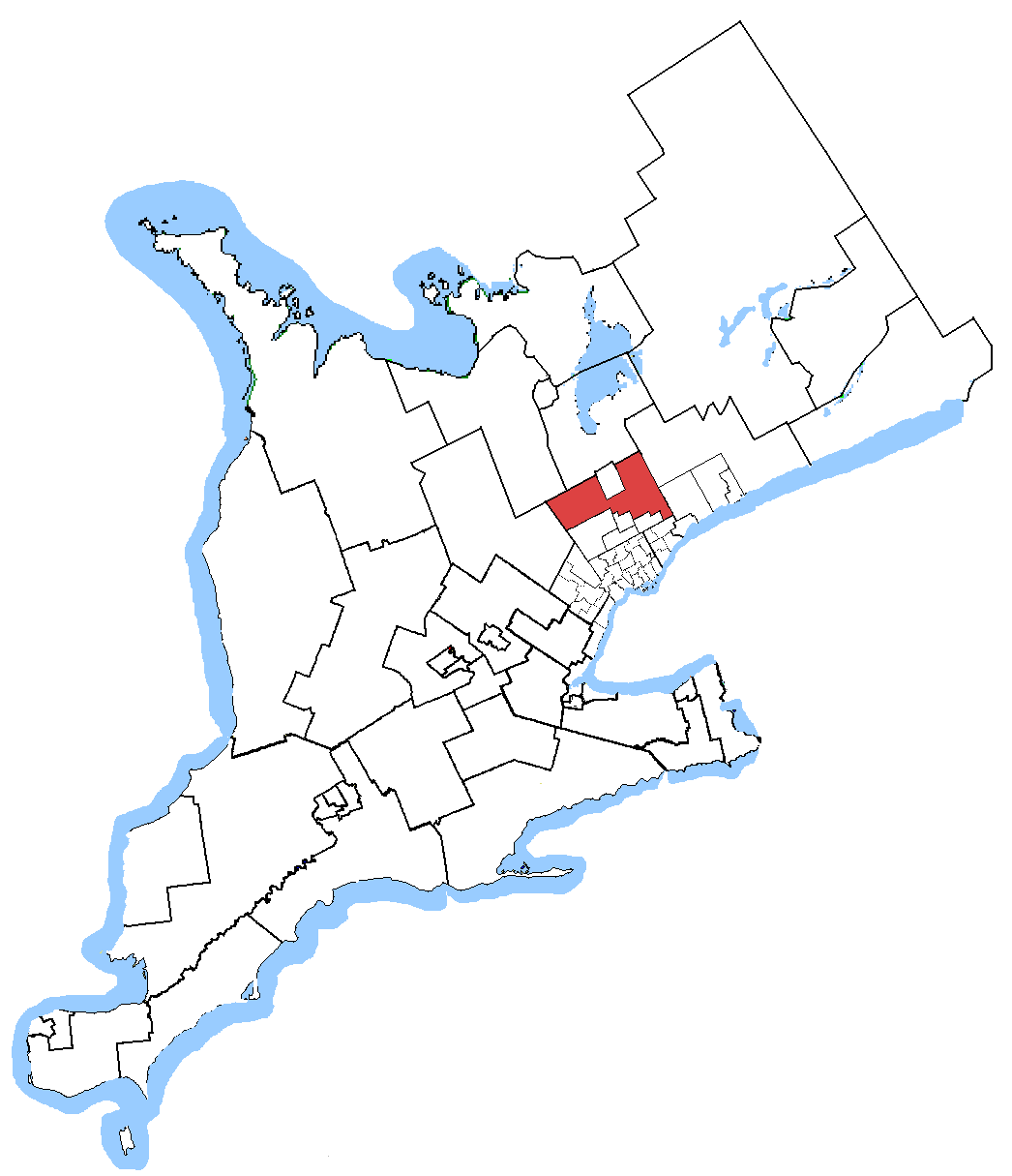
- Oak Ridges—Markham was in south-central Ontario, just north of Toronto
- Coordinates: 43°55′45″N 79°31′37″W; Location of the federal district constituency office in King City (as of 26 August 2010)

Defunct federal electoral district
- Legislature: House of Commons
- District created: 2003
- District abolished: 2013
- First contested: 2004
- Last contested: 2011
- District webpage: profile, map

Demographics
- Population (2011): 228,997
- Electors (2011): 151,584
- Area (km²): 679.90
- Census division: York
- Census subdivision(s): Markham, Richmond Hill, Whitchurch–Stouffville, King

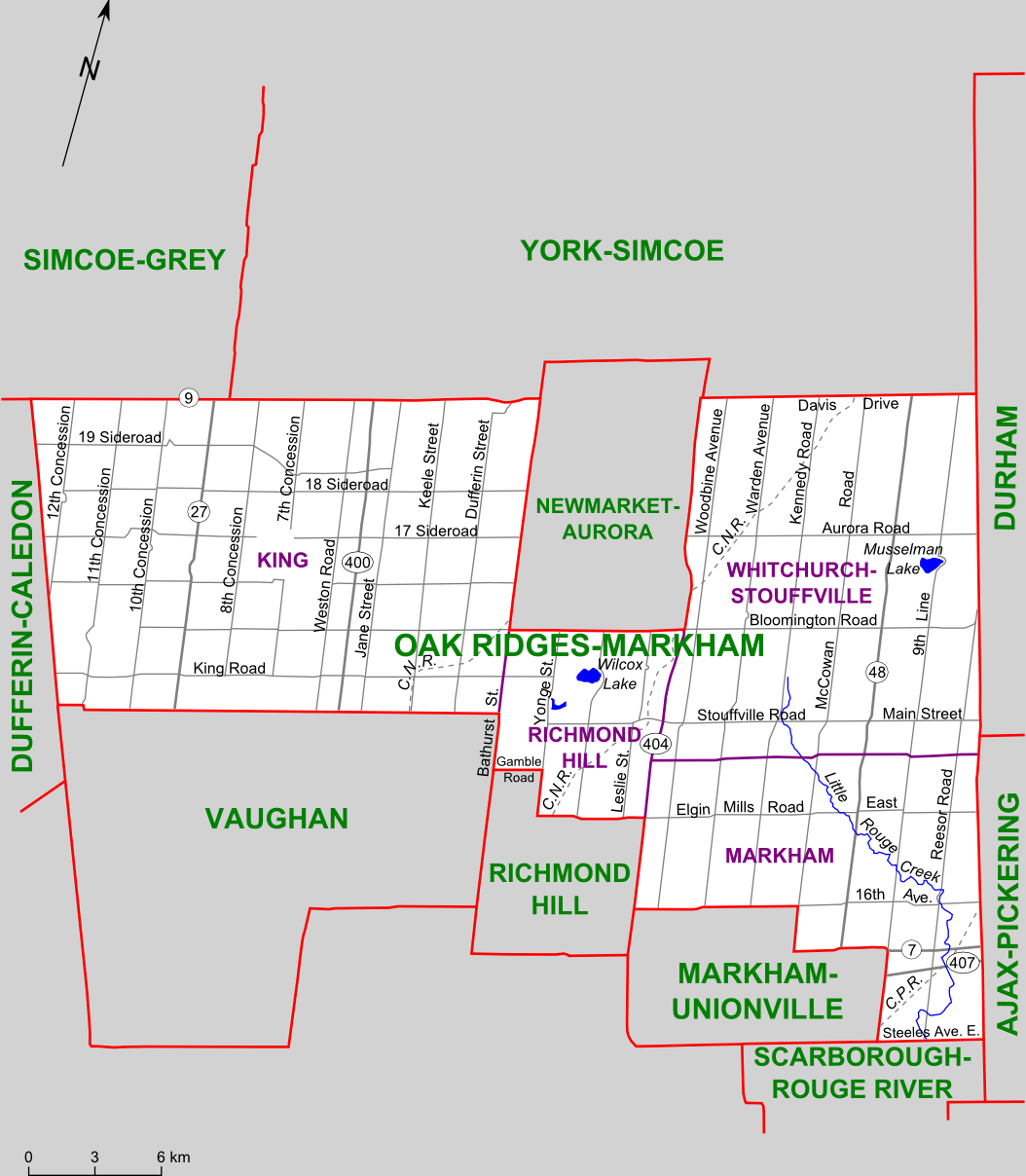
Map of Oak Ridges-Markham

Oak Ridges—Markham was a federal electoral district in Ontario, Canada, that was represented in the House of Commons of Canada from 2004 to 2015. Its population in 2006 was 169,645., with 136,755 electors, the highest of any riding in Canada. By 2011, the riding's population had risen to 228,997, the largest population of all ridings in Canada.

The district covered part of the suburbs north of Toronto. It included the town of Whitchurch–Stouffville, most of the township of King (excepting extreme northeast) the northern portions of the town of Richmond Hill (including all of Oak Ridges), and the northern and eastern portions of the city of Markham.

The electoral district was created in 2004 52.5% from Oak Ridges, 30% from Markham, 13% from Vaughan—King—Aurora, and 4.5% from York North riding.

Following the 2012 federal electoral boundaries redistribution, the district was split between King—Vaughan, Aurora—Oak Ridges—Richmond Hill, Markham—Unionville, and Markham—Stouffville.

== Demographics ==
Communities in Oak Ridges—Markham are the destination for many immigrants to Canada, composing about 41.6% of the population, or about 70,000 of its residents. For 72,440 residents, neither English nor French, the official languages of Canada, is their mother tongue, though most have knowledge of English (148,975), French (160), or both (12,885). Most immigrants become citizens, as 11,155 immigrants were not Canadian citizens as of the Canada 2006 Census.

The primarily urban district has a low proportion of Aboriginal residents compared to other parts of Canada, with just 625 people identifying themselves of such descent. It is also home to 70,070 residents who identify themselves as visible minorities, more than half of which are Chinese Canadians and about 20% are Black Canadians.

At the 2006 census, the participation rate of residents in the work force was 71.3%, and the electoral district unemployment rate was 5%, below the national average of 6.3%.

The district was the second-largest electoral district in Canada by population, next to Brampton West which had 170,422 residents at the 2006 census. It was the 64th largest in 2001, with a population of 111,276, but had the greatest population growth from 2001 to 2006, about 52.5%.

== Boundaries ==
According to Elections Canada, Oak Ridges—Markham consisted of that part of the Regional Municipality of York composed of:

(a) the Town of Whitchurch–Stouffville;

(b) the part of the Township of King south of Highway No. 9;

(c) the part of the Town of Richmond Hill lying north and east of a line drawn from the western town limit east along Gamble Road, south along Yonge Street and east along Elgin Mills Road East to the eastern town limit; and

(d) the part of the City of Markham lying north and east of a line drawn from the western town limit east along 16th Avenue, south along McCowan Road, east along Highway No. 7, and south along 9th Line to the southern town limit.

== Members of Parliament ==
This riding has elected the following members of the House of Commons of Canada:

Parliament	Years	Member	Party
Oak Ridges—Markham; Riding created from Oak Ridges, Markham, Vaughan—King—Aurora and York North
38th	2004–2006	Lui Temelkovski	Liberal
39th	2006–2008	Lui Temelkovski	Liberal
40th	2008–2011	Paul Calandra	Conservative
41st	2011–2015	Paul Calandra	Conservative
Riding dissolved into Markham—Stouffville, King—Vaughan, Markham—Unionville and Aurora—Oak Ridges—Richmond Hill

== Election results ==
Graph of general election results in Oak Ridges—Markham (minor parties that never got 2% of the vote or didn't run consistently are omitted) View source data.

2011 Canadian federal election
Party	Candidate	Votes	%	±%	Expenditures
Conservative	Paul Calandra	46,241	51.12	+8.88	$133,192
Liberal	Lui Temelkovski	25,561	28.26	-13.26	$108,951
New Democratic	Janice Hagan	15,229	16.84	+7.45	$4,650
Green	Trifon Haitas	2,349	2.60	-4.23	$0.00
Progressive Canadian	John Sicilano	1,080	1.19	–	$564
Total valid votes/Expense limit		90,460	100.00	–	$134,351
Total rejected ballots		430	0.47	–	
Turnout		90,890	59.96	+4.30	
Eligible voters		151,584	–	–	
Conservative hold		Swing		+11.07%	

2008 Canadian federal election
Party	Candidate	Votes	%	±%	Expenditures
Conservative	Paul Calandra	32,028	42.24	+3.77	$112,693
Liberal	Lui Temelkovski	31,483	41.52	-5.53	$68,266
New Democratic	Andy Arifin	7,126	9.39	-0.49	$2,020
Green	Richard Taylor	5,184	6.83	+2.24	$8,063
Total valid votes/Expense limit		75,821	100.00	$120,647	
Turnout		76,111	55.66	-11.23	
Conservative gain from Liberal		Swing		+4.65	

2006 Canadian federal election
Party	Candidate	Votes	%	±%	Expenditures
Liberal	Lui Temelkovski	35,048	47.05	-4.68	$55,610
Conservative	Bob Callow	28,695	38.47	+4.96	$92,644
New Democratic	Pamela Courtot	7,369	9.88	+1.10	$8,822
Green	Steve Armes	3,431	4.59	+0.70	$1,852
Total valid votes/Expense limit		74,543	100.00	$98,012	
Turnout		74,834	66.89	+3.51	
Liberal hold		Swing	-4.82		

2004 Canadian federal election
Party	Candidate	Votes	%	±%
Liberal	Lui Temelkovski	31,964	51.73	-1.34
Conservative	Bob Callow	20,712	33.51	-9.10
New Democratic	Pamela Courtot	5,430	8.78	+5.94
Green	Bernadette Manning	2,406	3.89	
Progressive Canadian	Jim Conrad	820	1.32	
Christian Heritage	Maurice Whittle	458	0.74	
Total valid votes		61,790	100.00	
Turnout		62,145	63.38	
Liberal hold		Swing	+3.88	

2004 change is based on redistributed results. Conservative change is compared to a combination of Canadian Alliance and Progressive Conservative votes.

== Redistribution ==
Because Oak-Ridges Markham had a population 115.60% over the Ontario quota (Canada's most populous riding) it was substantially affected by the 2012 electoral district redistribution. The district was renamed King—Vaughan, which consists of the Township of King south of Highway 9, along with the part of the City of Vaughan north of Major Mackenzie Drive, west of Highway 400, and north of Rutherford Road east of Hwy 400.

The part that is the town of Whitchurch–Stouffville and in the City of Markham east of Ontario Highway 48 / Main Street Markham/ York Regional Road 68 was incorporated into the new Markham—Stouffville riding. The part in the town of Richmond Hill is part of the new Aurora—Oak Ridges—Richmond Hill riding. Finally, the part in the city of Markham west of the above-mentioned roads is part of the new Markham—Unionville riding, which is different from the previous riding of the same name.

== See also ==
- List of Canadian electoral districts
- Historical federal electoral districts of Canada
