= Bill Attewell =

Canadian politician (1932–2021)

William Charles Attewell

Member of Parliament for Markham
- In office November 21st 1988 – October 25th 1993
- Preceded by: New riding
- Succeeded by: Jag Bhaduria

Member of Parliament for Don Valley East
- In office September 4th 1984 – November 21st 1988
- Preceded by: David Smith
- Succeeded by: Alan Redway

Personal details
- Born: January 21, 1932 Saint John, New Brunswick
- Died: December 24, 2021 (aged 89)
- Party: Conservative

William Charles Attewell (January 21, 1932 – December 24, 2021) was a Canadian politician.

A corporate executive, Attewell was first elected to the House of Commons of Canada as the Progressive Conservative Member of Parliament for Don Valley East defeating Liberal cabinet minister David Smith in the 1984 federal election that brought Brian Mulroney to power.

As a result of redistribution, he decided to move to the riding of Markham, just outside Toronto, where he owned property, for the 1988 federal election, leaving his former riding to former East York mayor Alan Redway, who retained the riding for the Tories.

Attewell won Markham, defeating Liberal candidate Jag Bhaduria and former Conservative MP John Gamble, who was running as an independent.

A backbencher throughout the Mulroney years, Attewell supported Kim Campbell in the 1993 Progressive Conservative leadership election, and following her victory, she appointed him as her parliamentary secretary in her capacity as Prime Minister of Canada. He ran in the 1993 federal election, but Bhaduria defeated him by an almost two-to-one margin in Markham—Whitchurch—Stouffville.

Attewell opposed the merger of the Progressive Conservative Party with the Canadian Alliance. He should not be mistaken for Bill Attwell who was president of the Oak Ridges—Markham federal Liberal riding association in 2007.

== Electoral record ==
1993 Canadian federal election: Markham—Whitchurch-Stouffville
Party	Candidate	Votes	%	±%
Liberal	Jag Bhaduria	35,909	46.50	+14.69
Progressive Conservative	Bill Attewell	19,695	25.51	-27.59
Reform	Joe Sherren	17,937	23.23	–
New Democratic	Jack Grant	1,692	2.19	-6.80
National	Sheldon Bergson	973	1.26	–
Natural Law	Stephen Porter	469	0.61	–
Independent	Paul Wang	458	0.59	–
Abolitionist	Dean Papadopoulos	85	0.11	–
Total valid votes		77,218	99.30	
Total rejected ballots		545	0.70	
Turnout		77,763	70.25	
Eligible voters		110,696		
Liberal gain from Progressive Conservative		Swing		+21.14
Sources: Canadian Elections Database, Library of Parliament

1988 Canadian federal election: Markham
Party	Candidate	Votes	%
Progressive Conservative	Bill Attewell	36,673	53.10
Liberal	Jag Bhaduria	21,973	31.81
New Democratic	Susan Krone	6,209	8.99
No affiliation	John A. Gamble	3,643	5.27
Libertarian	Ian Hutchison	568	0.82
Total valid votes		69,066	
Sources: Canadian Elections Database, Library of Parliament

1984 Canadian federal election: Don Valley East
Party	Candidate	Votes	%	±%
Progressive Conservative	Bill Attewell	29,706	54.4	+11.4
Liberal	David Smith	18,578	34.0	-10.6
New Democratic	Joe Macdonald	5,842	10.7	-0.9
Libertarian	Robert Champlain	356	0.7	+0.1
Independent	Arthur V. Wright	162	0.3	+0.1
Total valid votes		54,644	100.0	
