= King—Vaughan (federal electoral district) =

Federal electoral district in Ontario, Canada

Coordinates: 43.871°N 79.570°W

Ontario electoral district
- Interactive map of riding boundaries from the 2025 federal election

Federal electoral district
- Legislature: House of Commons
MP
Anna Roberts
Conservative
- District created: 2013
- First contested: 2015
- Last contested: 2025
- District webpage: profile, map

Demographics
- Population (2021): 147,695
- Electors (2015): 83,550
- Area (km²): 426.39
- Pop. density (per km²): 346.4
- Census division: York
- Census subdivision(s): Vaughan (part), King

King—Vaughan is a federal electoral district in Ontario, Canada.

King—Vaughan was created by the 2012 federal electoral boundaries redistribution and was legally defined in the 2013 representation order. It came into effect upon the dropping of the writs for the 2015 federal election. It was created out of parts of the ridings of Oak Ridges—Markham and Vaughan. It initially consisted of parts of the Township of King lying south of Highway 9 and Davis Drive West; and part of the City of Vaughan.

Following the 2022 Canadian federal electoral redistribution, it gained the remainder of King from York—Simcoe, and the Sherwood area from Thornhill. Its border with Vaughan—Woodbridge west of Islington Avenue was re-routed to follow Major Mackenzie Drive for its entirety, and it lost Vellore Village west of Highway 400 to Vaughan—Woodbridge, and the area south of Major Mackenzie and east of Dufferin Street to Thornhill.

== Geography ==
The riding consists of all of the Township of King and part of the City of Vaughan.

== Demographics ==
According to the 2021 Canadian census, 2023 representation order

Racial groups: 57.1% White, 14.0% South Asian, 8.3% Chinese, 3.9% West Asian, 3.6% Black, 2.5% Latin American, 2.4% Southeast Asian, 2.2% Filipino, 1.5% Arab, 1.0% Korean
Languages: 54.9% English, 8.8% Italian, 4.3% Russian, 4.2% Mandarin, 3.4% Urdu, 2.6/% Persian, 2.2% Spanish, 1.9% Cantonese, 1.6% Punjabi, 1.3% Portuguese, 1.3% Tamil, 1.3% Vietnamese, 1.0% French
Religions: 58.4% Christian (41.1% Catholic, 4.9% Christian Orthodox, 1.1% Anglican, 1.0% Pentecostal, 1.0% United Church, 9.2% Other), 10.1% Muslim, 4.8% Hindu, 3.6% Jewish, 2.2% Buddhist, 1.9% Sikh, 18.5% None
Median income: $43,600 (2020)
Average income: $66,600 (2020)

== Riding associations ==
Riding associations are the local branches of the national political parties:

Party	Association name	CEO	HQ city
Conservative Party of Canada	King—Vaughan Conservative Association	Elmer A. Reyes	Vaughan
Green Party of Canada	King—Vaughan Green Party Association	Ann E. Raney	King
Liberal Party of Canada	King—Vaughan Federal Liberal Association	Mubarak Ahmed	Vaughan
New Democratic Party	King—Vaughan Federal NDP Riding Association	Shannon Cruickshank	Stratford
People's Party of Canada	York Region PPC Association	Amir McKee	Vaughan

== Members of Parliament ==
This riding has elected the following members of Parliament:

Parliament	Years	Member	Party
King—Vaughan; Riding created from Oak Ridges—Markham and Vaughan
42nd	2015–2019	Deb Schulte	Liberal
43rd	2019–2021	Deb Schulte	Liberal
44th	2021–2025	Anna Roberts	Conservative
45th	2025–present	Anna Roberts	Conservative

== Election results ==
Graph of general election results in King—Vaughan (minor parties that never got 2% of the vote or didn't run consistently are omitted)

2025 Canadian federal election
Party	Candidate	Votes	%	±%
Conservative	Anna Roberts	41,682	61.53	+16.67
Liberal	Mubarak Ahmed	24,352	35.95	–6.95
New Democratic	Samantha Sanchez	769	1.14	–5.49
Green	Ann Raney	576	0.85	–0.42
People's	Vageesh Sabharwal	368	0.54	–3.81
Total valid votes/expense limit		67,747	99.15	
Total rejected ballots		584	0.85	+0.10
Turnout		68,331	71.16	+20.58
Eligible voters		96,019		
Conservative hold		Swing		+11.81
Source: Elections Canada

2021 federal election redistributed results
Party	Vote	%
Conservative	20,069	44.86
Liberal	19,192	42.90
New Democratic	2,962	6.62
People's	1,948	4.35
Green	569	1.27
Total valid votes	44,740	99.25
Rejected ballots	339	0.75
Registered voters/ estimated turnout	89,109	50.59

2021 Canadian federal election
Party	Candidate	Votes	%	±%	Expenditures
Conservative	Anna Roberts	22,534	45.1	+1.9	$108,112.39
Liberal	Deb Schulte	21,458	42.9	-2.1	$118,901.95
New Democratic	Sandra Lozano	3,234	6.5	-0.2	$1.48
People's	Gilmar Oprisan	2,149	4.3	+3.2	$1,615.90
Green	Roberta Herod	620	1.2	-2.7	$0.00
Total valid votes/Expense limit		49,995	–	–	$128,909.88
Total rejected ballots		385			
Turnout		50,380	49.00		
Eligible voters		102,820			
Conservative gain from Liberal		Swing		+2.0	
Source: Elections Canada

2019 Canadian federal election
Party	Candidate	Votes	%	±%	Expenditures
Liberal	Deb Schulte	28,725	45.00	-2.38	$95,558.89
Conservative	Anna Roberts	27,584	43.20	-1.00	$61,976.67
New Democratic	Emilio Bernardo-Ciddio	4,297	6.70	+0.17	none listed
Green	Ann Raney	2,511	3.90	+2.00	$16,180.64
People's	Anton Strgacic	731	1.10	+1.10	$1,568.81
Total valid votes/expense limit		63,848	100.0		
Total rejected ballots		598	0.93		
Turnout		64,446	64.94		
Eligible voters		99,246			
Liberal hold		Swing		-1.38	
Source: Elections Canada

2015 Canadian federal election
Party	Candidate	Votes	%	±%	Expenditures
Liberal	Deb Schulte	25,908	47.38	+19.87	$90,592.57
Conservative	Konstantin Toubis	24,170	44.20	-12.92	$144,224.44
New Democratic	Natalie Rizzo	3,571	6.53	-5.78	$6,632.62
Green	Ann Raney	1,037	1.90	-0.84	$9,983.35
Total valid votes/Expense limit		54,686	100.00		$222,565.07
Total rejected ballots		290	0.53	–	
Turnout		54,976	64.73	–	
Eligible voters		84,925			
Liberal gain from Conservative		Swing		+16.40	
Source: Elections Canada

2011 federal election redistributed results
Party	Vote	%
Conservative	22,172	57.12
Liberal	10,676	27.50
New Democratic	4,778	12.31
Green	1,063	2.74
Progressive Canadian	127	0.33

== See also ==
- List of Canadian electoral districts
- Historical federal electoral districts of Canada
