= Francesco Sorbara =

Canadian politician (born 1971)

Member of Parliament for Vaughan—Woodbridge
- In office October 19, 2015 – March 23, 2025
- Preceded by: Julian Fantino
- Succeeded by: Michael Guglielmin

Personal details
- Born: February 28, 1971 (age 55) Prince Rupert, British Columbia, Canada
- Party: Liberal
- Spouse: Rose Greco
- Children: 3
- Profession: corporate debt analyst

Francesco Sorbara (born February 28, 1971) is a Canadian politician who served as a Member of Parliament for the riding of Vaughan—Woodbridge from 2015 to 2025.

Sorbara served as a member of numerous Standing Committees during his tenure in the House of Commons, including the Standing Committee on Public Accounts, the Standing Committee on Industry and Technology, the Standing Committee on Natural Resources, and the Standing Committee on Access to Information, Privacy and Ethics. He was also an associate member of the House of Commons Standing Committee of Finance.

Sorbara is Chair of the Canada-Europe (CAEU) Parliamentary Association, Vice-chair of the Canada-United States Inter-Parliamentary Group as well as an executive member of the Canada-Germany, Canada-Ireland, Canada-Israel, Canada-Italy and Canada-Japan Interparliamentary Groups.

In the 2025 Liberal Party of Canada leadership election, he endorsed Mark Carney. He was unseated in the 2025 election by Conservative candidate Michael Guglielmin.

Following his defeat, it was announced that he had joined the office of Finance Minister François-Philippe Champagne as a policy advisor.

== Electoral record ==
2025 Canadian federal election: Vaughan—Woodbridge
** Preliminary results — Not yet official **
Party	Candidate	Votes	%	±%	Expenditures
Conservative	Michael Guglielmin	40,358	59.89	+19.62	
Liberal	Francesco Sorbara	25,676	38.10	–8.05	
New Democratic	Ali Bahman	895	1.33	–5.60	
People's	Roman Yevseyev	455	0.68	–4.71	
Total valid votes/expense limit					
Total rejected ballots					
Turnout		67,384	71.24		
Eligible voters		94,586			
Conservative notional gain from Liberal		Swing		+13.84	
Source: Elections Canada

2021 Canadian federal election: Vaughan—Woodbridge
Party	Candidate	Votes	%	±%	Expenditures
Liberal	Francesco Sorbara	21,699	45.98	-5.30	$101,382.39
Conservative	Angela Panacci	19,019	40.35	+4.01	$54,146.42
New Democratic	Peter Michael DeVita	3,265	6.93	-0.84	$1,680.93
People's	Mario Greco	2,567	5.45	+3.76	$4,672.39
Green	Muhammad Hassan Khan	453	0.96	-1.63	$361.60
Independent	Luca Mele	159	0.34	–	none listed
Total valid votes/expense limit		47,162	–	–	$111,032.70
Total rejected ballots		460			
Turnout		47,622	58.31%		
Eligible voters		80,832			
Liberal hold		Swing		-4.66	
Source: Elections Canada

2019 Canadian federal election: Vaughan—Woodbridge
Party	Candidate	Votes	%	±%	Expenditures
Liberal	Francesco Sorbara	25,810	51.28	+2.51	$99,407.18
Conservative	Teresa Kruze	18,289	36.34	-7.52	none listed
New Democratic	Peter DeVita	3,910	7.77	+3.12	none listed
Green	Raquel Fronte	1,302	2.59	+1.33	none listed
People's	Domenic Montesano	852	1.69		none listed
Independent	Muhammad Hassan Khan	165	0.33		$1,220.37
Total valid votes/expense limit		50,328	100.0		
Total rejected ballots		480			
Turnout		50,808	63.7		
Eligible voters		79,749			
Liberal hold		Swing		+5.05	
Source: Elections Canada

2015 Canadian federal election
Party	Candidate	Votes	%	±%	Expenditures
Liberal	Francesco Sorbara	23,131	48.90	–	–
Conservative	Julian Fantino	20,647	43.64	–	–
New Democratic	Adriana Marie Zichy	2,198	4.65	–	–
Libertarian	Anthony Gualtieri	731	1.55	–	–
Green	Elise Boulanger	600	1.27	–	–
Total valid votes/Expense limit		–	100.0		$205,908.35
Total rejected ballots		–	–	–	
Turnout		–	–	–	
Eligible voters		73,190			
Source: Elections Canada
