= Lui Temelkovski =

Canadian politician

Member of Parliament for Oak Ridges—Markham
- In office June 28, 2004 – October 13, 2008
- Preceded by: Riding created
- Succeeded by: Paul Calandra

Personal details
- Born: October 4, 1954 (age 71) Brajčino, Yugoslavia (Now North Macedonia)
- Party: Liberal
- Spouse: Loretta Temelkovski
- Children: 4
- Profession: Businessman

Ljubomir "Lui" Temelkovski (Macedonian: Љубомир Темелковски, romanized: Ljubomir Temelkovski) (born October 4, 1954) is a former Canadian federal politician. He was a Liberal Member of Parliament from 2004 to 2008 who represented the riding of Oak Ridges—Markham in Ontario.

== Background ==
Temelkovski was born Brajčino, Yugoslavia which is now part of the Republic of North Macedonia. His family emigrated to Canada in 1968. He received his Bachelor of Arts degree from McMaster University. He worked as a sales manager for Freedom 55 Financial, a Canadian financial services company. He and his wife Loretta live in Markham where they raised four children. He is fluent in Italian and Macedonian.

== Politics ==
In the 2004 Canadian federal election, Temelkovski ran as the Liberal candidate in the new riding of Oak Ridges—Markham. He defeated Conservative candidate Bob Callow by 11,252 votes. He served as a backbench supporter of the Paul Martin government. Temelkovski was the first Canadian Member of Parliament of Macedonian heritage. In 2004, he was appointed to serve on the Standing Committee on Citizenship and Immigration. He also served as the Vice-Chair of the Standing Committee on International Trade.

He was re-elected in the 2006 election once again defeating Callow. The Liberals lost the election and he served one term in opposition. During that time he served as critic for Public Works and Government Services.

In the 2008 election, he was defeated by Conservative candidate Paul Calandra by 545 votes. He tried again In the 2011 election and was defeated again by Calandra this time by more than 20,000 votes.

In 2013, Temelkovski expressed interest in the nomination for the new riding of Markham—Stouffville but the party chose Jane Philpott who went on to beat Calandra in the 2015 election.
