= Vaughan—Woodbridge (federal electoral district) =

Federal electoral district in Ontario, Canada

Ontario electoral district
- Interactive map of riding boundaries from the 2025 federal election
- Coordinates: 43.79°N 79.59°W

Federal electoral district
- Legislature: House of Commons
MP
Michael Guglielmin
Conservative
- District created: 2013
- First contested: 2015
- Last contested: 2025
- District webpage: profile, map

Demographics
- Population (2021): 106,810
- Electors (2021): 80,832
- Area (km²): 79.59
- Pop. density (per km²): 1,342
- Census division: York
- Census subdivision: Vaughan (part)

Vaughan—Woodbridge is a federal electoral district in Ontario, Canada. It covers the Woodbridge neighbourhood, previously included in the electoral district of Vaughan.

== Demographics ==
According to the 2021 Canadian census; 2013 representation

Ethnic groups: 65.7% White, 10.2% South Asian, 4% Chinese, 3.5% Latin American, 3.1% Southeast Asian, 3.1% West Asian, 3% Black, 1.9% Arab, 1.7% Filipino
Languages: 46.9% English, 18.8% Italian, 3% Spanish, 2.3% Punjabi, 1.9% Vietnamese, 1.8% Mandarin, 1.6% Portuguese, 1.4% Russian, 1.2% Arab, 1.1% Yue. 1% Tamil
Religions: 72.9% Christian (60.5% Catholic, 3.9% Christian Orthodox, 1% Pentecostal and other Charismatic), 11.5% No religion, 4.9% Muslim, 4.7% Hindu, 2.7% Sikh, 2.5% Buddhist
Median income (2020): $42,400
Average income (2020): $60,750

In 2021, the riding has the second-highest percentage of Italian Canadians in all of Canada (46.7%).

== History ==
Vaughan—Woodbridge was first proposed as part of the 2012 electoral district redistribution to contain the City of Vaughan west of Highway 400 and south of Major Mackenzie Drive. It was legally defined in the 2013 representation order and came into effect upon the dropping of the writs for the 2015 federal election.

Following the 2022 Canadian federal electoral redistribution, the riding's border with King—Vaughan west of Islington Avenue will be re-routed to follow Major Mackenzie Drive for its entirety. It will gains Vellore Village west of Highway 400 from King—Vaughan. The changes will come into effect upon the calling of the 2025 Canadian federal election.

== Members of Parliament ==
This riding has elected the following members of Parliament:

Parliament	Years	Member	Party
Vaughan—Woodbridge; Riding created from Vaughan
42nd	2015–2019	Francesco Sorbara	Liberal
43rd	2019–2021	Francesco Sorbara	Liberal
44th	2021–2025	Francesco Sorbara	Liberal
45th	2025–present	Michael Guglielmin	Conservative

== Election results ==
Graph of general election results in Vaughan—Woodbridge (minor parties that never got 2% of the vote or didn't run consistently are omitted)

=== 2023 representation order ===
2025 Canadian federal election
** Preliminary results — Not yet official **
Party	Candidate	Votes	%	±%	Expenditures
Conservative	Michael Guglielmin	40,358	59.89	+19.62	
Liberal	Francesco Sorbara	25,676	38.10	–8.05	
New Democratic	Ali Bahman	895	1.33	–5.60	
People's	Roman Yevseyev	455	0.68	–4.71	
Total valid votes/expense limit					
Total rejected ballots					
Turnout		67,384	71.24		
Eligible voters		94,586			
Conservative notional gain from Liberal		Swing		+13.84	
Source: Elections Canada

2021 federal election redistributed results
Party	Vote	%
Liberal	23,423	46.15
Conservative	20,438	40.27
New Democratic	3,515	6.93
People's	2,735	5.39
Green	488	0.96
Others	159	0.31

=== 2013 representation order ===
2021 Canadian federal election
Party	Candidate	Votes	%	±%	Expenditures
Liberal	Francesco Sorbara	21,699	45.98	-5.30	$101,382.39
Conservative	Angela Panacci	19,019	40.35	+4.01	$54,146.42
New Democratic	Peter Michael DeVita	3,265	6.93	-0.84	$1,680.93
People's	Mario Greco	2,567	5.45	+3.76	$4,672.39
Green	Muhammad Hassan Khan	453	0.96	-1.63	$361.60
Independent	Luca Mele	159	0.34	–	none listed
Total valid votes/expense limit		47,162	–	–	$111,032.70
Total rejected ballots		460			
Turnout		47,622	58.31%		
Eligible voters		80,832			
Liberal hold		Swing		-4.66	
Source: Elections Canada

2019 Canadian federal election
Party	Candidate	Votes	%	±%	Expenditures
Liberal	Francesco Sorbara	25,810	51.28	+2.51	$99,407.18
Conservative	Teresa Kruze	18,289	36.34	-7.52	none listed
New Democratic	Peter DeVita	3,910	7.77	+3.12	none listed
Green	Raquel Fronte	1,302	2.59	+1.33	none listed
People's	Domenic Montesano	852	1.69		none listed
Independent	Muhammad Hassan Khan	165	0.33		$1,220.37
Total valid votes/expense limit		50,328	100.0		
Total rejected ballots		480			
Turnout		50,808	63.7		
Eligible voters		79,749			
Liberal hold		Swing		+5.05	
Source: Elections Canada

2015 Canadian federal election
Party	Candidate	Votes	%	±%	Expenditures
Liberal	Francesco Sorbara	23,041	48.71	+18.00	$79,166.04
Conservative	Julian Fantino	20,746	43.86	-12.71	$157,901
New Democratic	Adriana Marie Zichy	2,198	4.65	-6.05	–
Libertarian	Anthony Gualtieri	716	1.51	–	–
Green	Elise Boulanger	597	1.26	-0.77	–
Total valid votes/Expense limit		47,298	100.0		$206,812.04
Total rejected ballots		438			
Turnout		47,736			
Eligible voters		73,190			
Liberal notional gain from Conservative		Swing		+15.36	
Source: Elections Canada

2011 federal election redistributed results
Party	Vote	%
Conservative	21,750	56.57
Liberal	11,806	30.71
New Democratic	4,113	10.70
Green	779	2.03

== Student vote results ==
2025 Vaughan—Woodbridge student vote
62.43%	25.39%	8.55%	3.67%
Conservative	Liberal	NDP	PPC

== See also ==
- List of Canadian electoral districts
- Historical federal electoral districts of Canada
