= Vaughan (federal electoral district) =

Former federal electoral district in Ontario, Canada

Coordinates: 43.846°N 79.562°W

Ontario electoral district
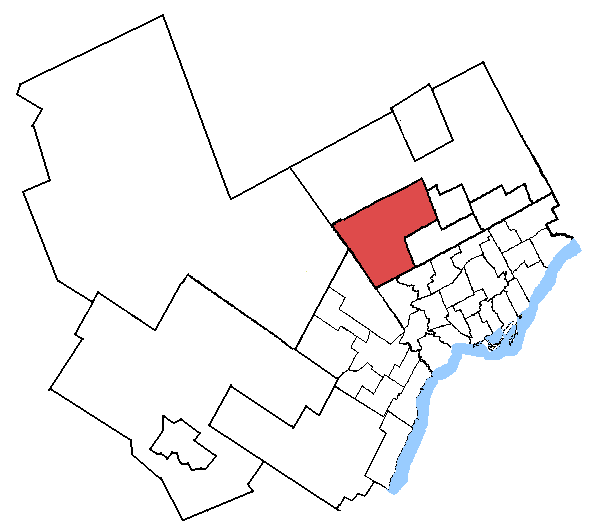
- Vaughan in relation to other Greater Toronto ridings
- District created: 2003
- District abolished: 2013
- First contested: 2004
- Last contested: 2011
- District webpage: profile, map

Demographics
- Population (2011): 196,068
- Electors (2011): 123,096
- Area (km²): 218.46
- Census division(s): York
- Census subdivision(s): Vaughan

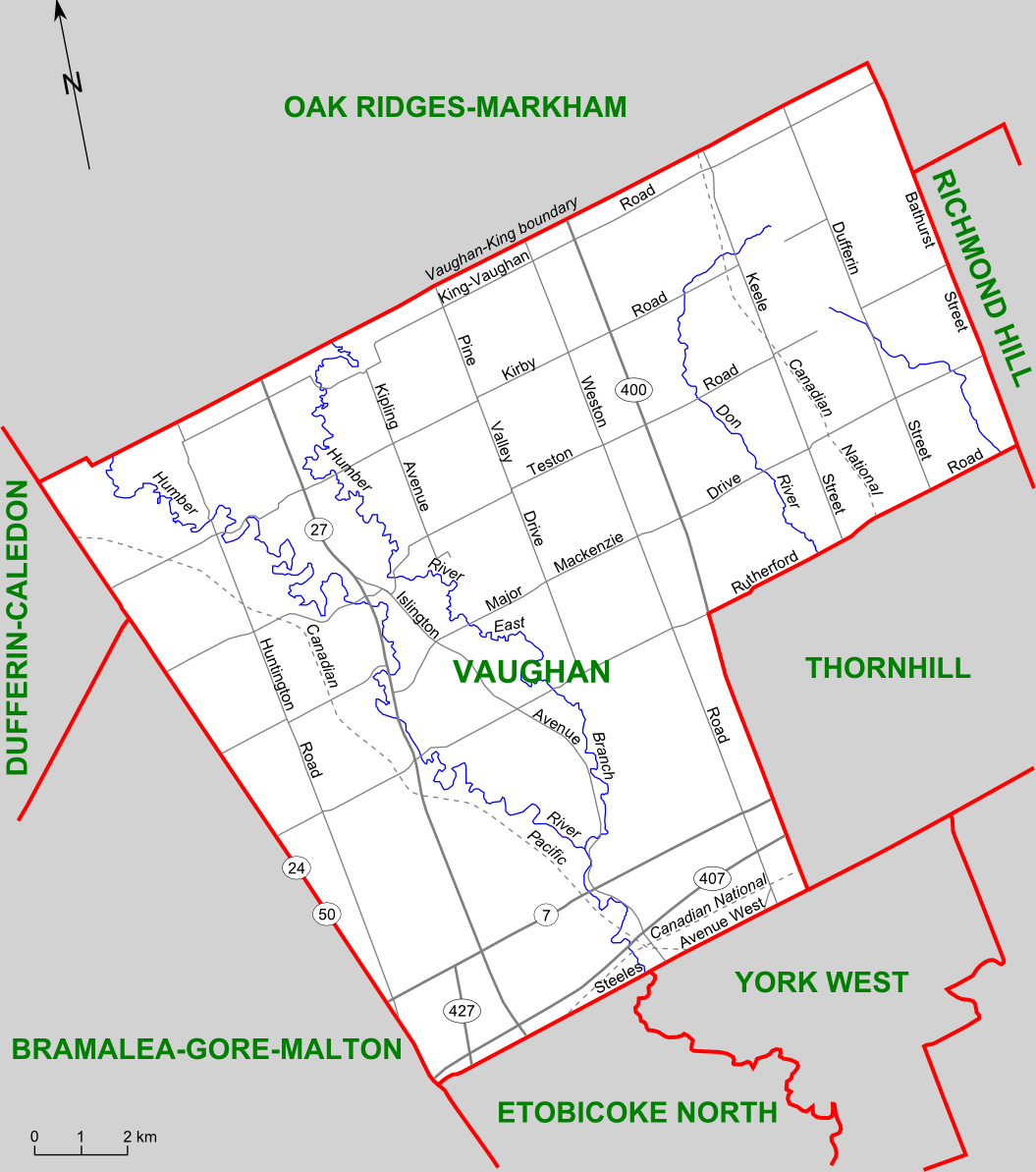
Map of Vaughan riding

Vaughan was a federal electoral district in Ontario, Canada, that was represented in the House of Commons of Canada from 2004 until 2015.

The riding covered the fast-growing region of Vaughan north of Toronto, Ontario.

The riding was created in 2003 from parts of Vaughan—King—Aurora riding. It consisted of the part of the City of Vaughan that lies west of Highway 400 or north of Rutherford Road.

== Political geography ==
The riding was divided between the rural and urban parts. The Conservative concentrations in the riding can be found in the more rural parts, in the north and east parts of the riding, like the community of Kleinburg. The rest of the riding, the more suburban southern part is strongly Liberal.

== Demographics ==
According to the 2006 Canadian census

Racial groups: 74.3% White, 9.3% South Asian, 2.7% Latin American, 2.5% Black, 2.4% Southeast Asian, 2.4% Chinese, 1.7% West Asian, 1.7% Filipino, 1.0% Arab
Languages: 44.8% English, 0.5% French, 54.6% Other
Religions (2001): 77.0% Catholic, 7.3% Protestant, 2.7% Muslim, 2.6% Christian Orthodox, 2.1% Sikh, 1.6% Hindu, 1.3% Buddhist, 3.9% No religion
Average income: $34,485

The Vaughan riding had the highest percentage of Italian Canadians in all of Canada (54.4%). 17.1% of its residents are Italian immigrants, the highest such percentage for a Canadian federal riding, and 19.2% of its residents having Italian as their mother tongue.

== Members of Parliament ==
This riding has elected the following members of Parliament:

| Parliament | Years | Member | Party |
|---|---|---|---|
Vaughan; Riding created from Vaughan—King—Aurora
| 38th | 2004–2006 | Maurizio Bevilacqua | Liberal |
| 39th | 2006–2008 | Maurizio Bevilacqua | Liberal |
| 40th | 2008–2010 | Maurizio Bevilacqua | Liberal |
| 40th | 2010–2011 | Julian Fantino | Conservative |
| 41st | 2011–2015 | Julian Fantino | Conservative |
Riding dissolved into Dufferin—Caledon, King—Vaughan and Vaughan—Woodbridge

== Election results ==
Graph of general election results in Vaughan (minor parties that never got 2% of the vote or didn't run consistently are omitted)

2011 Canadian federal election
| Party | Candidate | Votes | % | ±% | Expenditures |
|---|---|---|---|---|---|
| Conservative | Julian Fantino | 38,533 | 56.32 | +7.22 | – |
| Liberal | Mario Ferri | 20,435 | 29.87 | -16.78 | – |
| New Democratic | Mark Pratt | 7,940 | 11.60 | +9.92 | – |
| Green | Claudia Rodriguez-Larrain | 1,515 | 2.21 | +0.99 | – |
| Total valid votes | | 68,423 | 100.00 | | – |
| Total rejected ballots | | 480 | 0.70 | +0.12 | |
| Turnout | | 68,903 | 55.98 | +23.48 | |
| Conservative hold | | Swing | | | |

Canadian federal by-election, November 29, 2010 resignation of Maurizio Bevilacqua on September 2, 2010
| Party | Candidate | Votes | % | ±% | Expenditures |
|---|---|---|---|---|---|
| Conservative | Julian Fantino | 19,290 | 49.10 | +14.77 | – |
| Liberal | Tony Genco | 18,326 | 46.65 | -2.53 | – |
| New Democratic | Kevin Bordian | 661 | 1.68 | -7.96 | – |
| Green | Claudia Rodriguez-Larrain | 481 | 1.22 | -5.64 | – |
| Libertarian | Paolo Fabrizio | 251 | 0.64 | – | – |
| Independent | Leslie Bory | 111 | 0.28 | – | – |
| Progressive Canadian | Dorian Baxter | 110 | 0.28 | – | – |
| United | Brian Jedan | 55 | 0.14 | – | – |
| Total valid votes/expense limit | | 39,285 | 100.00 | | $114,412 |
| Total rejected ballots | | 231 | 0.58 | -0.16 | |
| Turnout | | 39,516 | 32.50 | -19.42 | |
| Conservative gain from Liberal | | Swing | | -8.6 | |

2008 Canadian federal election
| Party | Candidate | Votes | % | ±% | Expenditures |
|---|---|---|---|---|---|
| Liberal | Maurizio Bevilacqua | 27,773 | 49.18 | -10.54 | $36,208 |
| Conservative | Richard Lorello | 19,390 | 34.33 | +8.28 | $65,173 |
| New Democratic | Vicky Wilkin | 5,442 | 9.64 | +1.38 | $1,896 |
| Green | Adrian Visentin | 3,870 | 6.85 | +2.00 | $11,775 |
| Total valid votes/Expense limit | | 56,475 | 100.00 | | $103,581 |
| Total rejected ballots | | 421 | 0.74 | -0.02 | |
| Turnout | | 56,906 | 51.92 | -12.09 | |
| Liberal hold | | Swing | -9.4 | | |

2006 Canadian federal election
| Party | Candidate | Votes | % | ±% |
|---|---|---|---|---|
| Liberal | Maurizio Bevilacqua | 36,968 | 59.72 | -3.24 |
| Conservative | Richard Majkot | 16,124 | 26.05 | +2.37 |
| New Democratic | Yurgo Alexopoulos | 5,114 | 8.26 | -0.50 |
| Green | Adrian Visentin | 3,004 | 4.85 | +1.40 |
| Libertarian | Paolo Fabrizio | 688 | 1.11 | +0.33 |
| Total valid votes | | 62,031 | 100.00 | |
| Total rejected ballots | | 472 | 0.76 | -0.34 |
| Turnout | | 62,370 | 64.01 | +8.00 |
| Liberal hold | | Swing | -2.8 | |

2004 Canadian federal election
| Party | Candidate | Votes | % | ±% |
|---|---|---|---|---|
| Liberal | Maurizio Bevilacqua | 31,430 | 62.96 | -12.96 |
| Conservative | Joe Spina | 11,821 | 23.68 | +3.20 |
| New Democratic | Octavia Beckles | 4,371 | 8.76 | +5.78 |
| Green | Russell Korus | 1,722 | 3.45 | – |
| Libertarian | Paolo Fabrizio | 388 | 0.78 | – |
| Canadian Action | Walter Aolari | 192 | 0.38 | – |
| Total valid votes | | 49,924 | 100.00 | |
| Total rejected ballots | | 556 | 1.10 | |
| Turnout | | 50,480 | 56.01 | |
| Liberal hold | | Swing | -8.1 | |

^ % Change is based on redistributed results. Conservative change is from a combination of Progressive Conservative and Canadian Alliance parties.

== See also ==
- List of Canadian electoral districts
- Historical federal electoral districts of Canada
