= Markham (federal electoral district) =

Former federal electoral district in Ontario, Canada

Ontario electoral district
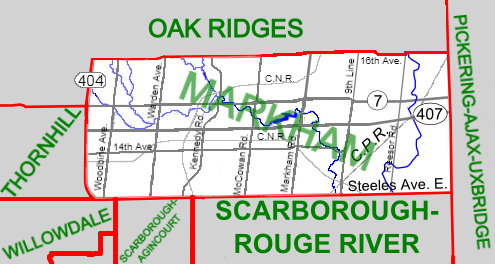
- Map of the riding

Defunct federal electoral district
- Legislature: House of Commons
- District created: 1988
- District abolished: 2003
- First contested: 1988
- Last contested: 2000

Demographics
- Population (2001): 142,408
- Electors (2002): 85,207
- Area (km²): 96
- Census subdivision: Markham

Markham was a federal electoral district in Ontario, Canada created in 1988. Also known as Markham—Whitchurch-Stouffville, it was a federal electoral district that elected representatives to the House of Commons of Canada from 1988 to 2000. Notably in 1997 this was the only district in Ontario that did not elect a Liberal MP or an independent (York South-Weston).

Markham riding was created from parts of York North and York—Peel ridings. It initially consisted of the towns of Markham and Whitchurch-Stouffville in the Regional Municipality of York. The name of the electoral district was changed in 1989 to "Markham—Whitchurch-Stouffville". The electoral district was redistributed 1996 into Markham, Oak Ridges and Thornhill ridings. The new Markham riding consisted of the part of the Town of Markham east of Highway No. 404 and south of 16th Avenue.

The electoral district was abolished in 2003 when it was redistributed between Markham—Unionville and Oak Ridges—Markham ridings.

== Members of Parliament ==
The riding has elected the following members of Parliament:

Parliament	Years	Member	Party
Markham; Riding created from York North and York—Peel
34th	1988–1993	Bill Attewell	Progressive Conservative
Markham—Whitchurch-Stouffville
35th	1993–1994	Jag Bhaduria	Liberal
35th	1994–1997	Jag Bhaduria	Independent
Markham
36th	1997–2000	Jim Jones	Progressive Conservative
36th	2000–2000	Jim Jones	Alliance
37th	2000–2004	John McCallum	Liberal
Riding dissolved into Markham—Unionville, Oak Ridges—Markham

== Election results ==
=== Markham ===
1988 Canadian federal election
Party	Candidate	Votes	%
Progressive Conservative	Bill Attewell	36,673	53.10
Liberal	Jag Bhaduria	21,973	31.81
New Democratic	Susan Krone	6,209	8.99
No affiliation	John A. Gamble	3,643	5.27
Libertarian	Ian Hutchison	568	0.82
Total valid votes		69,066	
Sources: Canadian Elections Database, Library of Parliament

=== Markham—Whitchurch-Stouffville ===
1993 Canadian federal election
Party	Candidate	Votes	%	±%
Liberal	Jag Bhaduria	35,909	46.50	+14.69
Progressive Conservative	Bill Attewell	19,695	25.51	-27.59
Reform	Joe Sherren	17,937	23.23	–
New Democratic	Jack Grant	1,692	2.19	-6.80
National	Sheldon Bergson	973	1.26	–
Natural Law	Stephen Porter	469	0.61	–
Independent	Paul Wang	458	0.59	–
Abolitionist	Dean Papadopoulos	85	0.11	–
Total valid votes		77,218	99.30	
Total rejected ballots		545	0.70	
Turnout		77,763	70.25	
Eligible voters		110,696		
Liberal gain from Progressive Conservative		Swing		+21.14
Sources: Canadian Elections Database, Library of Parliament

=== Markham ===
1997 Canadian federal election
Party	Candidate	Votes	%	±%
Progressive Conservative	Jim Jones	20,449	44.70	+19.19
Liberal	Gobinder Randhawa	16,810	36.74	-9.76
Reform	John Paloc	4,947	10.81	-12.42
Independent	Jag Bhaduria	1,584	3.46	–
New Democratic	Bhanu Gaunt	1,482	3.24	+1.05
Natural Law	Stephen Porter	258	0.56	-0.05
Canadian Action	Jeff Baulch	218	0.48	–
Total valid votes		45,748	99.16	
Total rejected ballots		387	0.84	
Turnout		46,135	67.48	
Eligible voters		68,366		
Progressive Conservative gain from Independent		Swing		+14.48
Sources: Canadian Elections Database, Library of Parliament

2000 Canadian federal election
Party	Candidate	Votes	%	±%
Liberal	John McCallum	32,104	66.6	+29.9
Alliance	Jim Jones	9,015	18.7	+7.9
Progressive Conservative	David Scrymgeour	5,085	10.6	-34.1
New Democratic	Janice Hagan	1,129	2.3	-0.9
Green	Bernadette Manning	493	1.0	–
Independent	Akber Choudhry	222	0.5	–
Canadian Action	Jim Conrad	130	0.3	-0.2
Total valid votes		48,178	100.0	
Liberal gain from Progressive Conservative		Swing		+32.0

== See also ==
- List of Canadian electoral districts
- Historical federal electoral districts of Canada
