= Oak Ridges (electoral district) =

Former federal electoral district in Ontario, Canada

Ontario electoral district
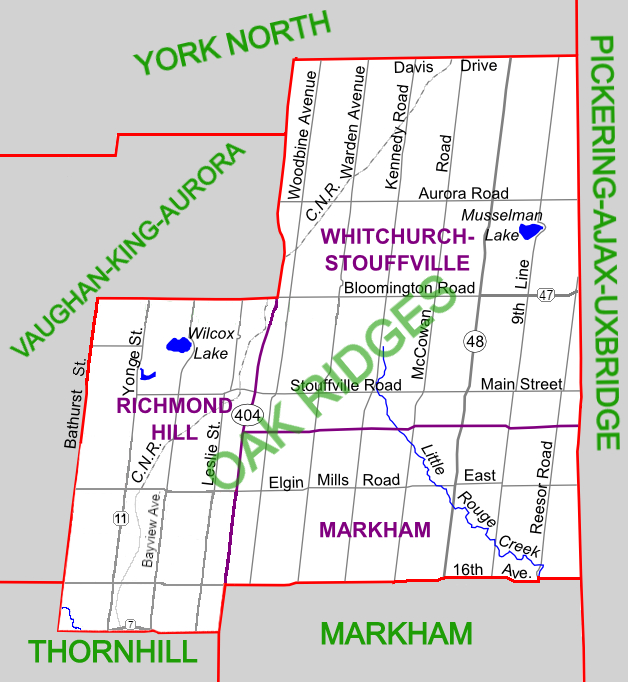
- Map of the riding

Defunct federal electoral district
- Legislature: House of Commons
- District created: 1996
- District abolished: 2003
- First contested: 1997
- Last contested: 2000

Demographics
- Population (2001): 173,378
- Electors (2002): 99,152
- Area (km²): 432

Oak Ridges was a federal electoral district in Ontario, Canada, that was represented in the House of Commons of Canada from 1997 to 2003. This riding was created in 1996, from parts of Markham—Whitchurch—Stouffville and York North ridings.

It consisted of the towns of Richmond Hill and Whitchurch-Stouffville, and the part of the town of Markham (now a city) north of 16th Avenue.

The electoral district was abolished in 2003 when it was redistributed between Oak Ridges—Markham and Richmond Hill ridings.

== Members of Parliament ==
This riding has elected the following members of Parliament:

Parliament	Years	Member	Party
Riding created from Markham—Whitchurch—Stouffville and York North
36th	1997–2000	Bryon Wilfert	Liberal
37th	2000–2004	Bryon Wilfert	Liberal
Riding dissolved into Oak Ridges—Markham and Richmond Hill

== Election results ==
1997 Canadian federal election
Party	Candidate	Votes
Liberal	Bryon Wilfert	27,394
Progressive Conservative	John Andersen	12,232
Reform	Edward Sarafian	7,568
New Democratic	Wynne Hartviksen	2,411
Natural Law	William Ayling	281
Canadian Action	Dean Force	167

2000 Canadian federal election: Oak Ridges
Party	Candidate	Votes
Liberal	Bryon Wilfert	33,058
Alliance	Bob Callow	11,714
Progressive Conservative	John Oostrom	8,409
New Democratic	Joseph Thevarkunnel	1,623
Green	Steven Haylestrom	672
Natural Law	Mary Wan	172

== See also ==
- List of Canadian electoral districts
- Historical federal electoral districts of Canada
