= David Scrymgeour =

Canadian politician, professor, entrepreneur

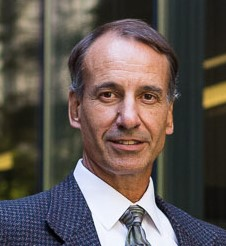
- Born: Toronto, Ontario, Canada
- Occupation: Adjunct Professor Entrepreneur Political Consultant

Academic background
- Education: University of Toronto

Academic work
- Discipline: Applied Management
- Institutions: Oxford University University of Toronto Queens University

David Scrymgeour is executive in residence at the Said Business School and business fellow at the Smith School of Enterprise and the Environment, Oxford University.

He is also adjunct professor and executive-in-residence at the Rotman School of Management, University of Toronto, leads workshops for Venture for Canada and lectures in the MBA/MIB programs at the Smith School of Business, Queens University.

== Entrepreneurial ==
Scrymgeour worked globally as a corporate trouble-shooter before founding organisations including File Tech Inc., an information management company; The Skills Network, a group of skills training businesses; and Green Standards Ltd, an award-winning move management company that provides circular economy solutions for corporate waste that benefit both community and environment.

== Political Consulting ==
Scrymgeour held the position of national director of the Progressive Conservative Party of Canada under former Prime Minister of Canada Joe Clark from 2002 to 2003, resigning as part of the deal between David Orchard and Peter MacKay that led to MacKay's assumption of leadership and caused a storm of protest within the party. He was later named the first national director of the new Conservative Party of Canada.

Prior to the Rose Revolution of November 2003, he delivered political, organisational and election readiness training in the former Soviet Republic of Georgia.

In early 2004, he managed the lead up to Jim Flaherty's campaign for the leadership of the Progressive Conservative Party of Ontario.

In August 2004, he was hired for a dollar-per-year as an advisor to the Green Party of Canada by its leader Jim Harris. In the position paper, Green and Growing, he outlined a political organization structure that emphasized minimum critical central coordination under an executive director and the building of volunteer-based electoral district associations.

In the 2007 Ontario provincial election, he served as organisation director of the Green Party of Ontario, delivering the first full slate of 107 candidates in its history. He then served as chief financial officer from 2007 to 2010 and as Campaign Chair for the 2011 Ontario General Election.

== Community ==
Scrymgeour has acted as an advisor, donor and/or board member for organizations including Venture for Canada, MaRS Discovery District, One Laptop per Child, the Belinda Stronach Foundation, the Canadian Executive Service Organization, Oak Ridges Moraine Land Trust, Anglican Church of Canada and the Make Poverty History Campaign.

He also mentors student start-up organisations at Oxford, Toronto and Queens Universities.
