= Muck Crops Research Station =

Coordinates: 44°2′36.7″N 79°35′34.25″W

The Muck Crops Research Station is an agriculture research facility near Kettleby and Ansnorveldt, in Ontario, Canada. It is operated by the Office of Research at the University of Guelph.

The station's research is focussed on several key areas:

- Crop protection of muck vegetables
- Evaluation of vegetable cultivars
- Post-harvest storage and treatment
- Soil and crop management

The station features greenhouses with a system-controlled environment, a plant pathology laboratory, and long-term cold storage. Seven hectares of land are split into plots devoted to researching organic and mineral soils. Local growers also participate in commercial field trials on occasion.

== Crop protection ==
Various long-term research projects analyze and assess the impact of indigenous and invasive pests and parasites. Since 1998, the site has studied the over-wintering ability of the pea leafminer in southern Ontario, as well as associated parasitoid complexes collected from leafminer pupae.

Protection from fungi and molds during storage is also studied at this station. For example, the mold Sclerotinia releases oxalic acid, a compound that allows the mold to infect carrots. Researchers are studying the use of "calcium formulations to deter Sclerotinia growth".

Another focus is to establish sustainable methods of dealing with agricultural pests, such as the carrot weevil and the carrot rust fly.

== Vegetable cultivars ==
One of the site's important functions is to determine the viability and suitability of specific crop cultivars in the Holland Marsh. The area is a major producer of onions, carrots, lettuce, celery and Asian vegetables.

== Storage and treatment ==
The aim of research into storage of crops is to identify crops that may be grown in the Holland Marsh and stored for eventual winter distribution, so that residents of Ontario may have access to Ontario-grown vegetables year-round.

Onions, especially, and carrots go into long-term cold storage here," says McDonald. "So Ontario could supply the market year round and avoid importing from other countries.

== Soil and crop management ==
To improve yield and reduce the negative impact of agricultural practices on farmland, studies at this research station have attempted to identify conditions under which it is most appropriate to apply specific fertilizers. For example, nitrogen fertilizers are typically applied to carrot crops to improve yields and reduce leaf blight. Research at this station suggests that by matching the use of nitrogen fertilizers to the type of soil in which carrots are grown, high yields may be achieved. Moreover, this can be done with less nitrogen fertilizer and minimizing the use of fungicides to control leaf blight, decreasing costs and mitigating some environmental concerns.
