= Kettleby =

Kettleby may refer to:

- Kettleby, Lincolnshire (also spelled Kettelby), England
- Kettleby, Ontario, Canada
- Ab Kettleby, Leicestershire, England
- Eye Kettleby, near Melton Mowbray, Leicestershire, England
