= Heritage King =

Conservation committee in King Township, Ontario, Canada

Heritage King, formerly the King Local Architectural Conservation Advisory Committee, is a conservation committee in King Township, Ontario, Canada. Consisting of between five and eleven members, with at least one township councillor, the committee advises council on local heritage matters. Founded in 1982, Heritage King exists by township by-law under the Ontario Heritage Act, which "provides a framework within which municipalities can ensure the conservation of properties of cultural heritage value or interest"
