= Blair Acton Burrows =

Blair Acton Burrows (1884-1985) was born in Winnipeg, Manitoba.

She was the daughter of Helen Blair Sevigny and Acton Burrows, Minister of Agriculture for Manitoba. When Ms. Burrows was 11 her family moved to Toronto where she lived until 1948.

Blair Acton Burrows was a sportswoman who golfed, skied and skated in many shows at the Toronto Skating Club. She was one of the first women in Toronto to drive a car. In her late 30s she traveled to New York to study design and, in so doing, gained some financial independence.

== The Mud House ==
At the age of 50 she bought a property in the Township of King with the intention of building a house using only local materials. She researched the ancient technique of Pisé de Terre, or rammed earth method, for a year prior to starting construction in 1937. The house was built by just a carpenter and two unskilled students, using only local materials and without cutting a tree. At the time of construction, it was the first “rammed earth” house in Canada, and remains the only example of this construction method in the Township of King, and one of the few in Canada.

The 'Mud' House features a stone foundation, stone chimney, steep roof, a metal weather wane in the shape of a dog (supposedly based on Miss Burrows's own pet), wrought iron hinges, and is naturally fire retardant and bug resistant.

The house has come to be known as the 'Mud' House. She wrote "Building with Mud, Rammed Earth or Pisé de Terre" (Ontario Department of Lands and Forests, Toronto, Canada, 46 pages, n.d.).

Blair Burrows lived in the Mud House until she was ninety years old. During her years there she took up country pursuits and became adept at gardening and planted hundreds of trees on her property. She learned to make homemade hams, relishes and birch sap wine. She sewed, knitted and hooked rugs and was one of the early members of the collective Kingcrafts. She designed and helped embroider the alter cloths for All Saints' Church in King City.

In 2009 was "listed" on King's heritage registry, which means it was recognized as having architectural, historic or cultural features of merit but that the owner is not restricted to how they might want to renovate their house.
