= Snowball, Ontario =

Snowball
- Unincorporated community
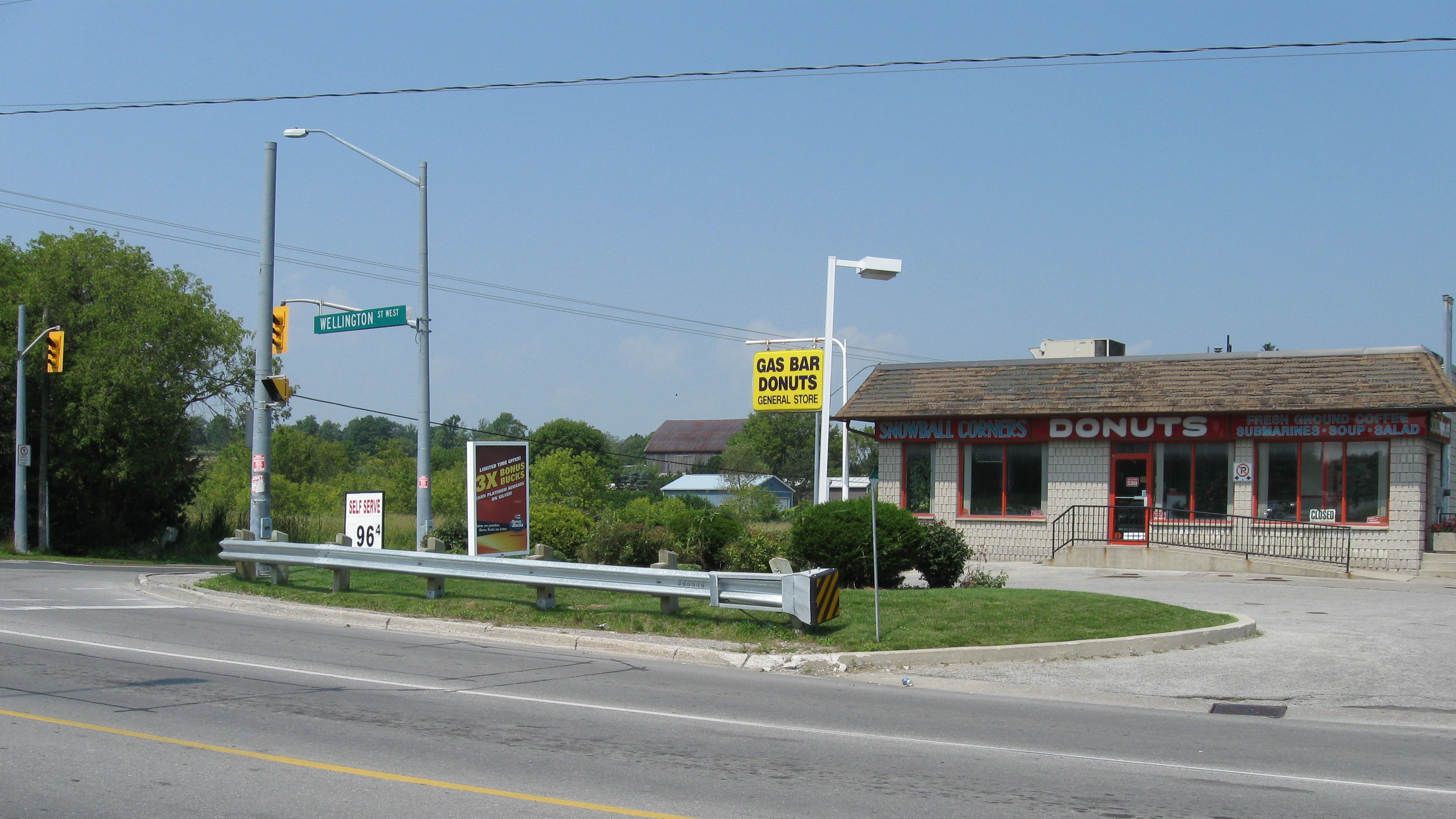
- Snowball Corners
- Interactive map of Snowball
- Coordinates: 43°59′20″N 79°31′04″W
- Country: Canada
- Province: Ontario
- Regional Municipality: York
- Township: King

Government
  - Township mayor: Steve Pellegrini
  - MP: Anna Roberts
  - MPP: Stephen Lecce
  - Councillor: Jordan Alexander Cescolini
- Time zone: UTC-5 (EST)
  - Summer (DST): UTC-4 (EDT)
- Forward sortation area: L0G
- Area codes: 905 and 289
- NTS Map: 030M13
- GNBC Code: FCPTY

Snowball is a hamlet in the township of King, Ontario, Canada, at the crossroads of Wellington Street West (17th sideroad) and Dufferin Street. It is located north of Eversley. Snowball is part of electoral Ward 1 in King.

== History ==
According to a story archived at the King City branch of the King Township Public Library that was written by the Snowball Women's Institute in 1926, the community's name dates to 1850 and the construction of a log church by its residents. Workers had packed the joints with snow and had to wait for the spring melt before completing construction. An overheated stove burned the church down 20 years later.

== Present day ==
It has an estimated population of 190 people and is known for its horseback riding schools; locally, it is known for its large garden centre. At its crossroads are also found a gas station with an attached coffee shop and adjacent diner.

In 2005, a golf course and new residential zone were built in Snowball, and its population has increased.
