= KTPL (disambiguation) =

KTPL may refer to:

- KTPL, a Christian radio station broadcasting in Colorado Springs, Colorado, USA
- King Township Public Library, a public library system in King, Ontario, Canada
- Draughon-Miller Central Texas Regional Airport, an airport in Temple, Texas, USA with ICAO designation KTPL
