= Sapric =

Soil type

- Muck
- Used in: WRB, USDA soil taxonomy, others
- WRB code: sa, HSsa
- Parent material: Organic matter

A sapric is a subtype of a histosol wherein virtually all of the organic material has undergone sufficient decomposition to prevent the identification of plant parts and even fecal matter. Muck is a sapric soil that is naturally waterlogged or is artificially drained.

== Classification ==
The soils are deep, dark colored, and friable, often underlain by marl, or marly clay.

=== World Reference Base ===
The World Reference Base for Soil Resources (WRB) defines "sapric" (sa) as a histosol having less than one-sixth (by volume) of the organic material consisting of recognizable plant tissue within 100 cm of the soil surface.

=== Canada ===
Muck soils fall under the Organic Order in the Canadian system of soil classification. Muck soils are organic soils, with a minimum of 30% organic matter and a depth of at least 40 cm.

=== United States ===
In the USDA soil taxonomy, sapric may be a subtype of a haplohemist or glacistel type, and may also be a diagnostic organic soil material whose fiber content is less than one-sixth of the volume. Muck soils are defined by the USDA NRCS as sapric organic soils that are saturated more than 30 cumulative days in normal years or are artificially drained. An example would be a soil made up primarily of humus from drained swampland.

== Use and vegetation ==
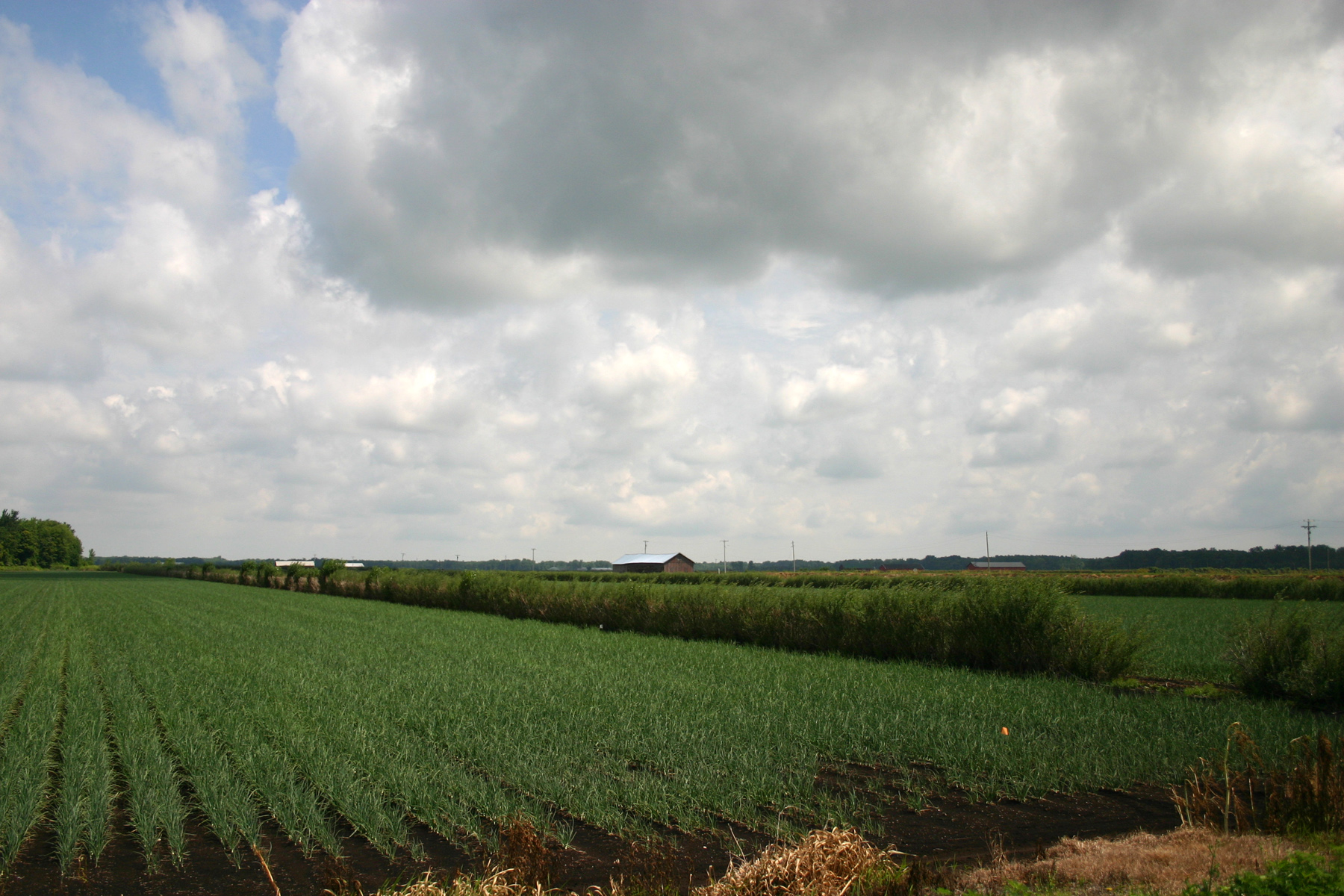
Onion fields near Elba, New York, part of Torrey Farms, showing black dirt and windbreaks.

Muck soil is used for growing specialty crops such as onions, carrots, celery, and potatoes.

== Geography ==
Muck farming on drained swamps is an important part of agriculture in New York, Ohio, Illinois, Indiana, Michigan, Wisconsin, and Florida, where mostly vegetables are grown. The muckland of Torrey Farms of Elba, New York, which covers the counties of Orleans, Niagara, and Genesee, is thought to be the largest continuous section of muckland in the world. Another large tract of muckland, known as the Black Dirt Region, exists in the lower Hudson Valley. American "muckers" often have roots from the Netherlands or Eastern Europe, where their ancestors practiced a similar type of farming. Holland Marsh, north of Toronto, Ontario, is the site of the Muck Crops Research Station, a University of Guelph facility.

== Conservation ==
Muck farming is controversial because the drainage of wetlands destroys wildlife habitats and results in a variety of environmental problems. It is unlikely that any more will be created in the United States because of environmental regulations. It is prone to problems. The soil is very light, so windbreaks are necessary to protect these fields in dry weather. It also can catch fire and burn underground for months. Oxidation also removes a portion of the soil each year, making it progressively shallower. Oxidation also discharges carbon dioxide. Some muck land has been reclaimed and restored as wetlands for wildlife preserves.

The impacts of drainage and agricultural production cause the loss of organic matter in muck soils through erosion, oxidation, and other processes collectively called "subsidence." Agricultural practices such as cover cropping and reduced tillage can significantly reduce subsidence but can not reverse it. Muck soils are, in essence, a non-renewable agricultural resource.

== Etymology ==
The word muck has much usage in the English language, referring in some cases to agricultural soil, and in others to dirt in general, and animal dung (sometimes human feces) in particular. Origins are probably from Norse, Danish, and Proto-Germanic roots referring to cow dung.

== See also ==
- Peat
