= Kettleby, Ontario =

Kettleby
- Unincorporated community
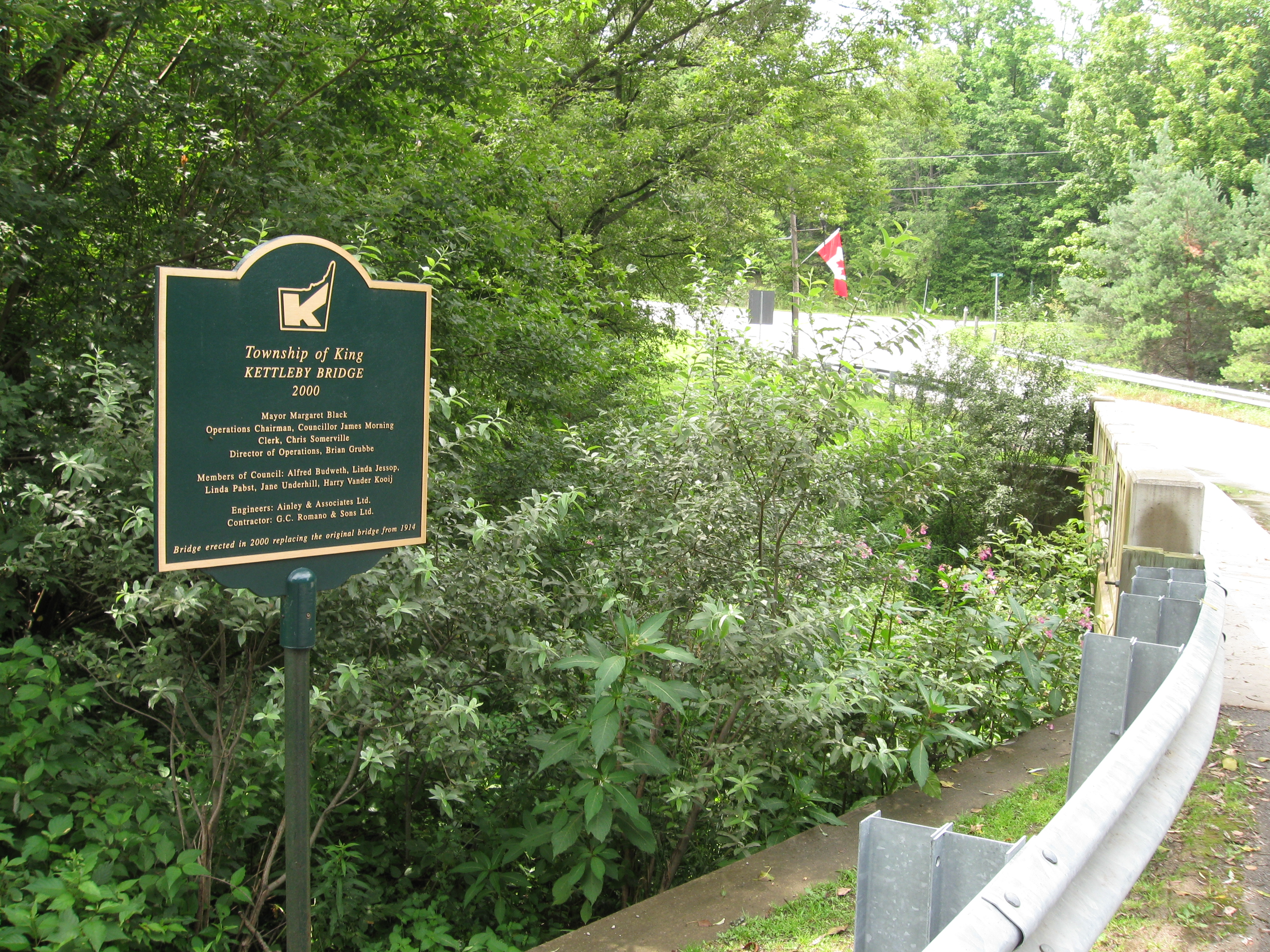
- A plaque beside the Kettleby Bridge

- Location within Regional Municipality of York Location within Southern Ontario
- Coordinates: 44°00′30″N 79°33′53″W
- Country: Canada
- Province: Ontario
- Regional municipality: York Region
- Township: King

Government
  - Township mayor: Steve Pellegrini
  - Councillor: Debbie Schaeffer (Ward 5)
  - MP: Deb Schulte
  - MPP: Stephen Lecce

Area
  - Land: 1 km^{2} (0.39 sq mi)

Population (2001)
  - Total: 127
- Time zone: UTC-5 (EST)
  - Summer (DST): UTC-4 (EDT)
- Forward sortation area: L7B
- Area codes: 905 and 289
- NTS Map: 031D04
- GNBC Code: FBUFH

Kettleby is an unincorporated community in the northeastern part of King Township in Ontario, Canada. It is located about 1.5 kilometres (0.93 mi) east of Highway 400, 25 kilometres (16 mi) north of Toronto, about 40 kilometres (25 mi) south of Barrie, 6 kilometres (3.7 mi) west of Newmarket, and about 50 kilometres (31 mi) east of Orangeville.

== Geography ==
Kettleby is surrounded by the rolling hills of King Township. The hamlet spans 1 square kilometre (0.39 sq mi), while the Kettleby postal area spans 32.5 square kilometres (12.5 sq mi) of land area.

The hamlet sits predominantly on a rise of land between two valleys of the looping Kettleby Creek. Hills surround the western, southern and the central parts of Kettleby while taller hills ranging as high as about 350 metres (1,150 ft) are to the north and reach close to the highway linking Orangeville and Newmarket (Highway 9). Farmlands lie to the southeast while the Holland Marsh lies to the north, one of the lowest points in King Township.

== History ==
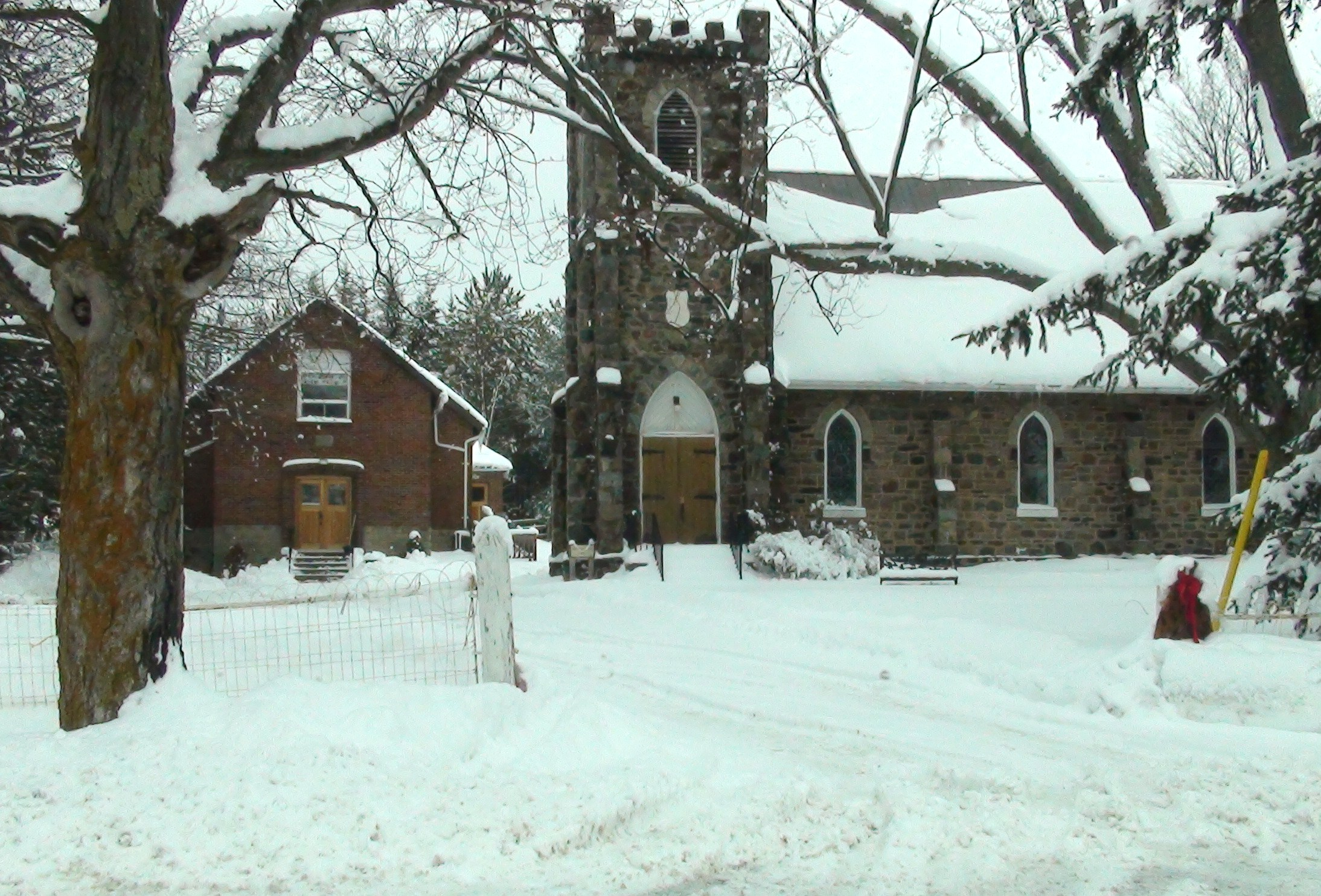
Church in Kettleby, Ontario

Kettleby was established no later than 1825, when Jacob Tool of Pennsylvania purchased 100 acres (0.40 km^{2}) in a wide ravine, including a stream. He built a sawmill powered by the stream's flow, but little other development occurred in the area. It was the industrious Septimus Tyrwhitt, who purchased 46 acres (190,000 m^{2}) of Tool's property in 1842, that spurred development of more mills and the eventual settlement of Kettleby. Early settlers often referred to it as Tyrwhitt's Mills, in honour of Tyrwhitt. However, he disapproved of the name, and his wife subsequently named the hamlet Kettleby, after the Tyrwhitt family ancestral home in Lincolnshire, England. That the name Kettle Bee derived from the construction bee of raising Tyrwhitt's mill, which drew many men from surrounding villages, is a local urban legend. Tyrwhitt was named reeve of King Township in 1852.

On August 6, 1851, the first post office was opened, and was styled Kettleby Mills, Canada West. In September 1859, it was renamed Kettleby, by which name it is still known today.

Kettleby had the largest membership in the Sons of Temperance society in Upper Canada, with over 200 members, and was "one of the strongholds of the temperance movement in the mid-19th century". Temperance Hall, a gathering place of the Sons of Temperance, was built in 1850. It was transported to Black Creek Pioneer Village in order to preserve it. The hamlet's first distillery preceded the movement by nearly a decade, having been erected in 1843, and numerous establishments throughout King were licensed to serve alcohol, including two hotels in Kettleby.

The minutes of a King Township agricultural society note that at a meeting the usual toasts were drunk: 'The Queen–three times; Prince Albert and the Royal Family–three times; and the Governor General–three times.' At the conclusion of the session the minutes record that all were much pleased with the business of the day and with each other.

— Rural Roots: Pre-Confederation Buildings of the York Region of Ontario, Myers et al

== Climate ==
Kettleby has a continental climate moderated by the Great Lakes and influenced by warm, moist air masses from the south, and cold, dry air from the north. The Oak Ridges Moraine affects levels of precipitation: as an air mass arrives from Lake Ontario and reaches the elevated ground surface of the moraine, it rises causing precipitation.

Climate data for Kettleby
| Month | Jan | Feb | Mar | Apr | May | Jun | Jul | Aug | Sep | Oct | Nov | Dec | Year |
|---|---|---|---|---|---|---|---|---|---|---|---|---|---|
| Record high °C (°F) | 13.0 (55.4) | 14.5 (58.1) | 24.0 (75.2) | 30.0 (86.0) | 32.5 (90.5) | 35.5 (95.9) | 36.0 (96.8) | 35.6 (96.1) | 33.0 (91.4) | 27.0 (80.6) | 24.0 (75.2) | 20.0 (68.0) | 36.0 (96.8) |
| Mean daily maximum °C (°F) | −3.4 (25.9) | −2.3 (27.9) | 3.1 (37.6) | 11.0 (51.8) | 18.5 (65.3) | 23.6 (74.5) | 26.3 (79.3) | 25.1 (77.2) | 20.1 (68.2) | 13.1 (55.6) | 6.0 (42.8) | −0.4 (31.3) | 11.7 (53.1) |
| Mean daily minimum °C (°F) | −11.4 (11.5) | −10.6 (12.9) | −5.5 (22.1) | 1.2 (34.2) | 6.4 (43.5) | 11.3 (52.3) | 13.9 (57.0) | 13.0 (55.4) | 9.0 (48.2) | 3.6 (38.5) | −1.0 (30.2) | −7.2 (19.0) | 1.9 (35.4) |
| Record low °C (°F) | −36.0 (−32.8) | −33.0 (−27.4) | −29.0 (−20.2) | −14.0 (6.8) | −4.0 (24.8) | −2.0 (28.4) | 2.5 (36.5) | 0.5 (32.9) | −6.5 (20.3) | −8.9 (16.0) | −22.0 (−7.6) | −31.5 (−24.7) | −36.0 (−32.8) |
| Average precipitation mm (inches) | 53.9 (2.12) | 44.4 (1.75) | 55.0 (2.17) | 62.8 (2.47) | 72.0 (2.83) | 75.1 (2.96) | 87.8 (3.46) | 88.6 (3.49) | 83.3 (3.28) | 68.3 (2.69) | 57.3 (2.26) | 25.4 (1.00) | 690.9 (27.20) |
Source: Environment Canada

== Demographics ==
The postal route of RR1 and RR2 Kettleby which includes the hamlet of Kettleby, the Carrying Place development and most of the community of Pottageville has 430 dwellings with a population of 1248. The actual hamlet of Kettleby has 40 dwellings, a church, cemetery, bakery, day camp and conservation area with a 2012 population of 101 made up of 84 adults and 17 children.

== Politics ==
Kettleby does not have its own municipal government. Decisions for allocating tax revenues are made by King Township's council. Kettleby is represented by the councillor of Ward 5, currently Debbie Schaeffer.

Kettleby residents vote in the electoral district of King-Vaughan both provincially and federally.

== Education ==
The Kettleby Public School serves the municipality for children of elementary school age. King City Secondary School is the closest high school to the community.

== Research ==
The University of Guelph conducts agricultural research at the Muck Crops Research Station in the Kettleby area. Facilities at the site include greenhouses with a system-controlled environment, a plant pathology laboratory, and long-term cold storage. Seven hectares of land are split into plots devoted to researching organic and mineral soils. Local growers also participate in commercial field trials on occasion.
