= Laskay, Ontario =

Laskay
- Unincorporated rural community
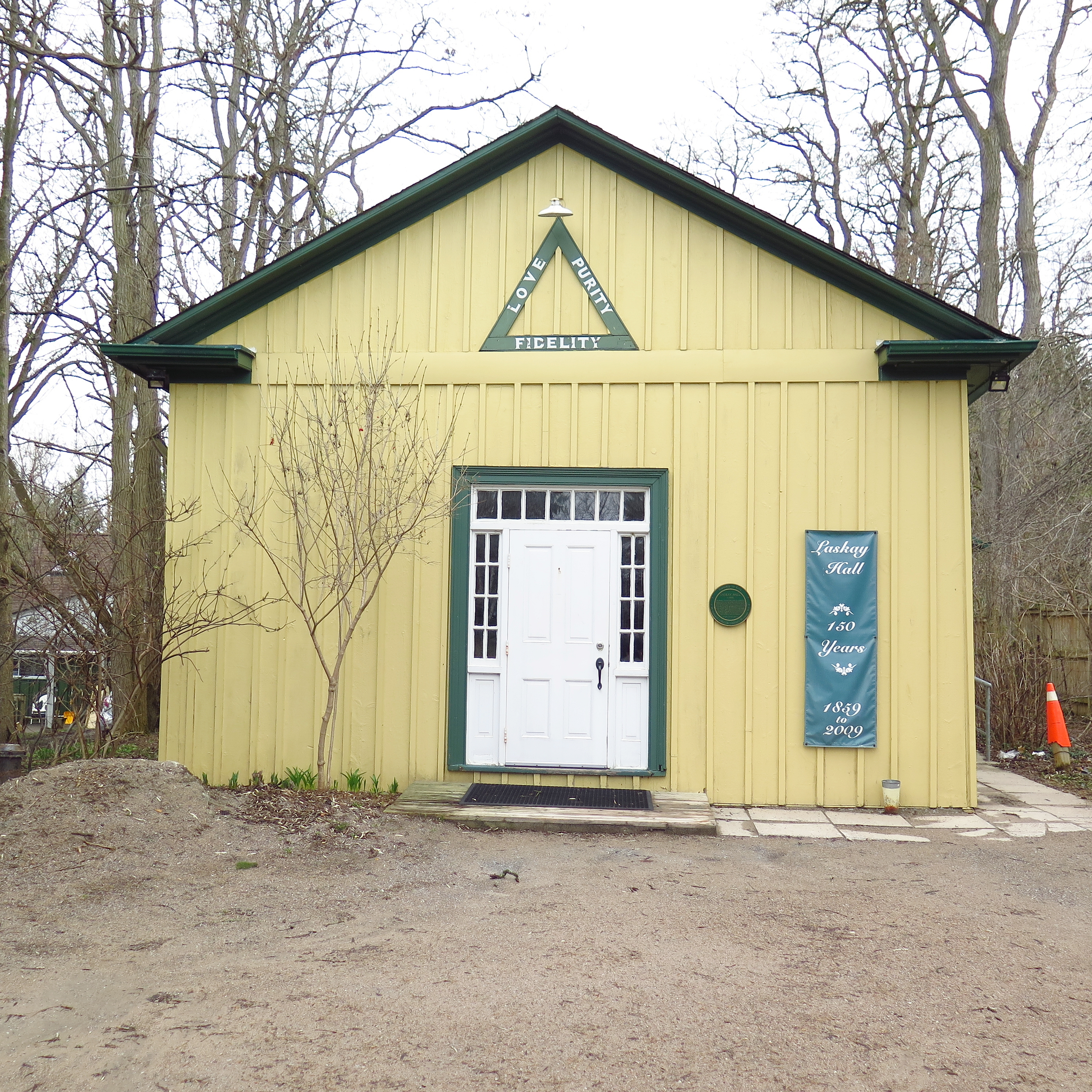
- Laskay Hall in 2017, before it was moved to the King Township Museum grounds
- Nickname: Bulltown (historical)
- Location within Canada Location within Ontario
- Coordinates: 43°54′48″N 79°34′38″W
- Country: Canada
- Province: Ontario
- Regional Municipality: York
- Township: King

Government
  - Township mayor: Steve Pellegrini
  - MP: Anna Roberts
  - MPP: Stephen Lecce
  - Councillor: David Boyd (Ward 2)
- Time zone: UTC-5 (EST)
  - Summer (DST): UTC-4 (EDT)
- Forward sortation area: L0G
- Area codes: 905 and 289
- NTS Map: 030M13
- GNBC Code: FBWLK

Laskay is an unincorporated rural community in King Township, York Regional Municipality, Ontario, Canada. It is west of King City and Highway 400, and south of the King Road—Weston Road intersection.

The settlement was named by Joseph Baldwin, and was named after his hometown Loskie in Yorkshire, England. The community has also been known as "Bulltown", a nickname it acquired after a fall fair in which a bull broke loose from its enclosure and charged the patrons.

Several of the original buildings in the community have been moved to other locations. The Laskay Emporium, built in 1856, was moved to Black Creek Pioneer Village on 19 February 1960. In August 2017, Laskay Hall was moved from its original site to the grounds of the King Township Museum in King City.

== In film ==
In 1967, a portion of the film The Fox was filmed at a farm in Laskay (today located on Laskay Lane).
