= King Creek, Ontario =

King Creek
- Unincorporated community
- Interactive map of King Creek
- Coordinates: 43°54′3″N 79°36′42″W
- Country: Canada
- Province: Ontario
- Regional Municipality: York
- Township: King

Government
  - Township mayor: Steve Pellegrini
  - MP: Anna Roberts
  - MPP: Stephen Lecce
  - Councillor: David Boyd (Ward 2)
- Time zone: UTC-5 (EST)
  - Summer (DST): UTC-4 (EDT)
- Forward sortation area: L0G
- Area codes: 905 and 289
- NTS Map: 030M13
- GNBC Code: FBUQN

King Creek is a community in King township, Ontario, Canada. The community took its name from King Creek, the former name for the East Humber River, and was once known as Stoke's Hollow.

== History ==
Settled by Christopher Stokes in 1834, the community grew around his grist and flour mill, as well as a general store. Starting in 1866, the general store accommodated the King Creek post office.

In July 1937, a plan of subdivision was registered for Humber Trails as a summer residential district nestled in the valley around King Creek west of Mill Road.

After Hurricane Hazel, in the fall of 1954, the Toronto Regional Park Authority expropriated the land creating the Humber Trails Conservation area. One street named Elmpine Trails, on the south side of the King Creek, was not expropriated as the homes were on high ground with no chance of a flood damaging the houses. Several properties on Mill Road were also not expropriated for the same reason. For approximately fifteen years the Humber Trails Conservation Area was a manicured park. However a decision was made to allow the park to become a nature preserve.

Today there are few signs that streets and homes and later, a manicured park had existed in the valley, except for a few walking paths and a King Creek post office structure that was assimilated into the buildings of a private residence and working farm located on either side of Mill Road, King Township, Ontario, Canada. The area is located immediately east of Nobleton. To the east is King City. Residents vote in Ward 2 in King Township municipal elections.

In 2023, the government of Ontario announced that Vianet, Inc., would be providing high-speed Internet services to the King Creek community.

== Environment ==
The Humber Trails Forest and Wildlife Area is a protected park in King Township. A tributary to the Humber River (Ontario), the East Humber River, formerly The King Creek passes through this park.

The King Creek Marsh is a provincially significant wetland, wholly marshes, primarily composed of submergent vegetation and narrow-leaved emergents. It rests upon a 41,800 square metre palustrine site of clay, loam and silt.

== In film ==
- An episode of The Forest Rangers, "The Dog Catcher", was shot at King Creek in 1963. Mill Road and Elmpine Trail can be seen, as well as the former concrete bridge over the creek.
