= Kinghorn Methodist Episcopal Cemetery =

Cemetery in King, Ontario, Canada

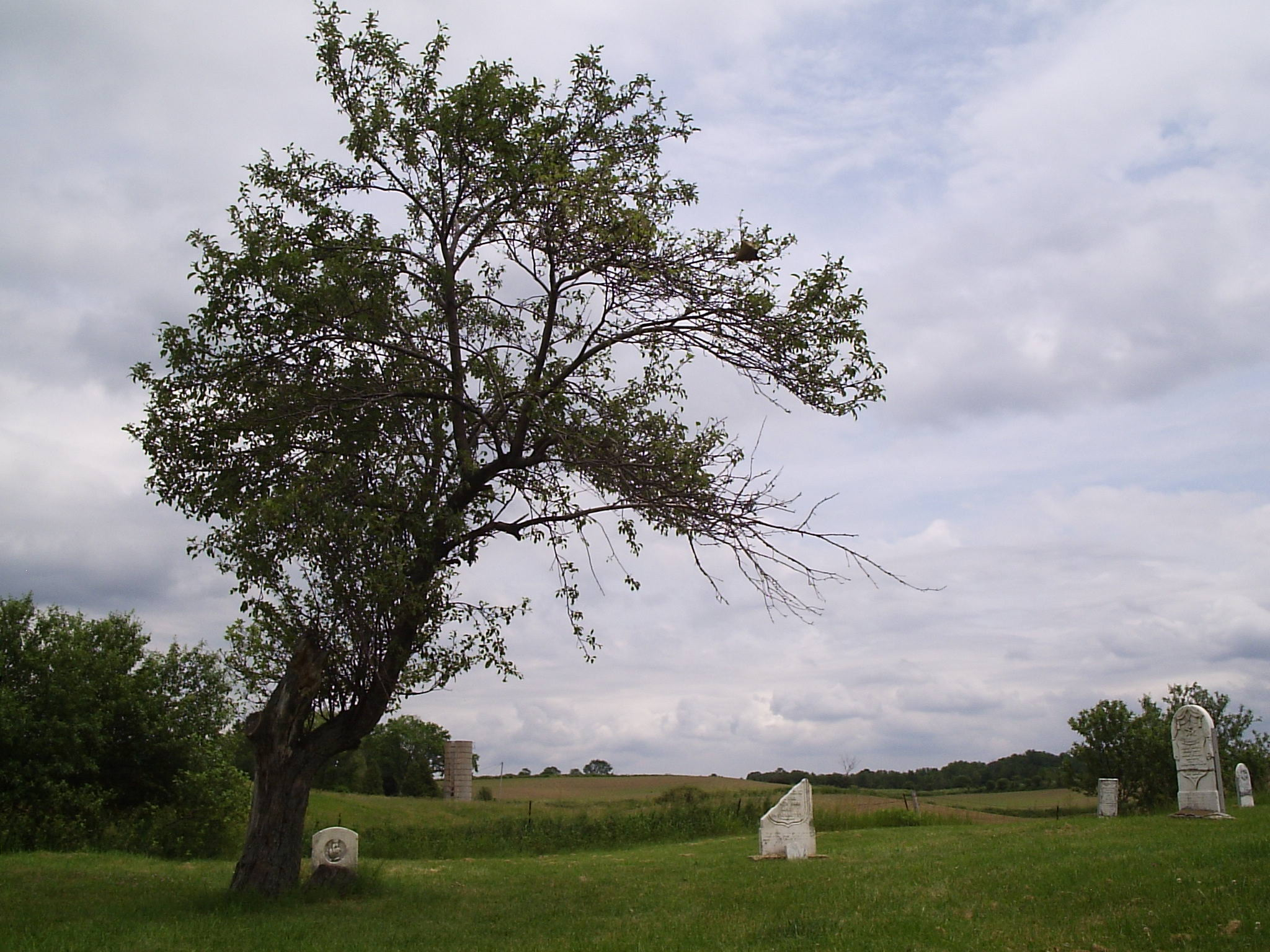
- Kinghorn Methodist Episcopal Cemetery
- Interactive map of Kinghorn Methodist Episcopal Cemetery

Details
- Established: 1848
- Location: Jane St., King, Ontario
- Country: Canada
- Coordinates: 43°55′17″N 79°33′12″W
- Type: Protestant
- No. of graves: 30
- Find a Grave: Kinghorn Methodist Episcopal Cemetery

Kinghorn Methodist Episcopal Cemetery is located in the Kinghorn community of King, Ontario. The cemetery sits on a hill 300 metres south of King road, on the east side of Jane street. It was established in 1848. Of the 30 headstones that are visible on the site only 24 are still standing. Many have cracked and fallen over with age, and have later been restored and reinforced.
