= Torrey Farms =

Farm in New York State, U.S.

Coordinates: 43°5′0.9″N 78°12′4.5″W

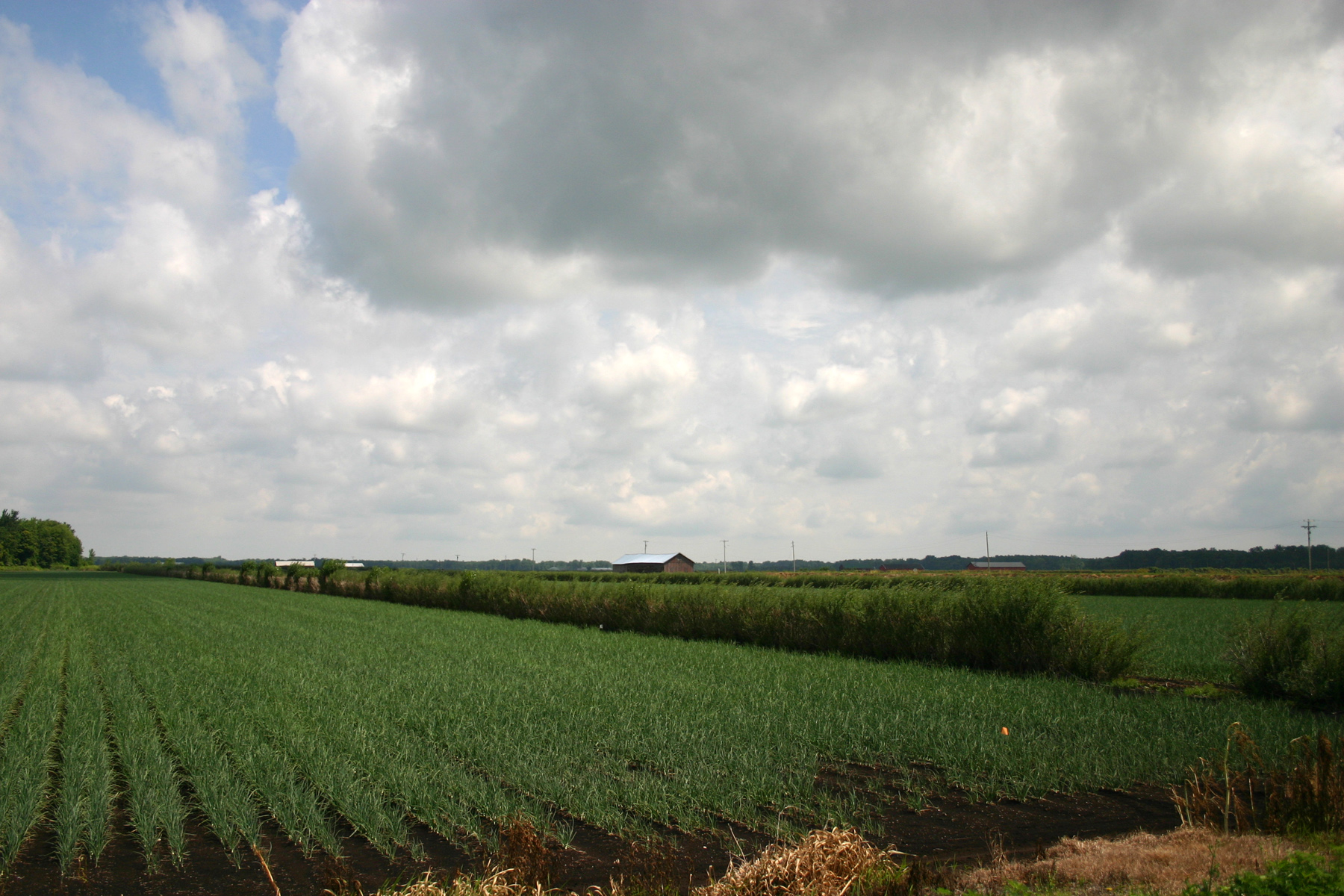
Elba muckland onion fields

Torrey Farms is a large family farm located in Elba, New York, in the state's far west, near Batavia. It has a smaller satellite property located in Potter in the west-central Finger Lakes region. Torrey Farms is one of the largest vegetable-crop farm operations in New York. Together its two lots total some 10,000-acre (40 km^{2}), composed primarily of muckland composed of drained swampland.

The farm grows mainly vegetable crops such as sweet corn, onions, carrots, cabbage, squash, cucumbers, and potatoes, which is generally what is produced on muckland. The main farm in Elba comprises about 800-acre (3.2 km^{2}) and spans parts of Orleans, Niagara and Genesee counties.

The 1,200-acre (4.9 km^{2}) property in Potter makes up the majority of a valley of muckland that stretches all the way to Gorham along Flint Creek. It was a swamp until it was drained in the 1950s. Not all of the valley is owned by the Torreys. The muckland in Elba is thought to be the largest continuous section of muckland in the world.

== History ==
In 1626, the Torrey family left England due to disagreement with the church. The family first settled in Connecticut, but later moved West in search of better soil. In 1803, John Torrey arrived in Bethany, New York. In 1948 Elbert Torrey purchased the Higley Farm in Elba. Today, the Torrey family farms over 10,000 acres (40 km^{2}).

== Labor ==
The farm makes use of migrant workers. In October 1997, 25 illegal migrant workers from Torrey Farms were arrested and set to be deported by Immigration. This was one of the largest immigration raids in New York history and, along with other raids of the time, it caused a significant local labor shortage. Mareen Torrey, owner of Torrey Farms said, "I’m probably going to end up leaving $2 million worth of crop in the field and it’s adding up every day"

== Rocket launches ==
In July 2009, the Tripoli Rocketry Association held the 28th annual LDRS (Large, Dangerous Rocket Ships) model rocket launch event at the Potter, New York portion of Torrey Farms; the 31st was held in July 2021; and the 34th in June 2015.
