= Holland River =

River in Ontario, Canada

Coordinates: 44°12′10″N 79°30′55″W

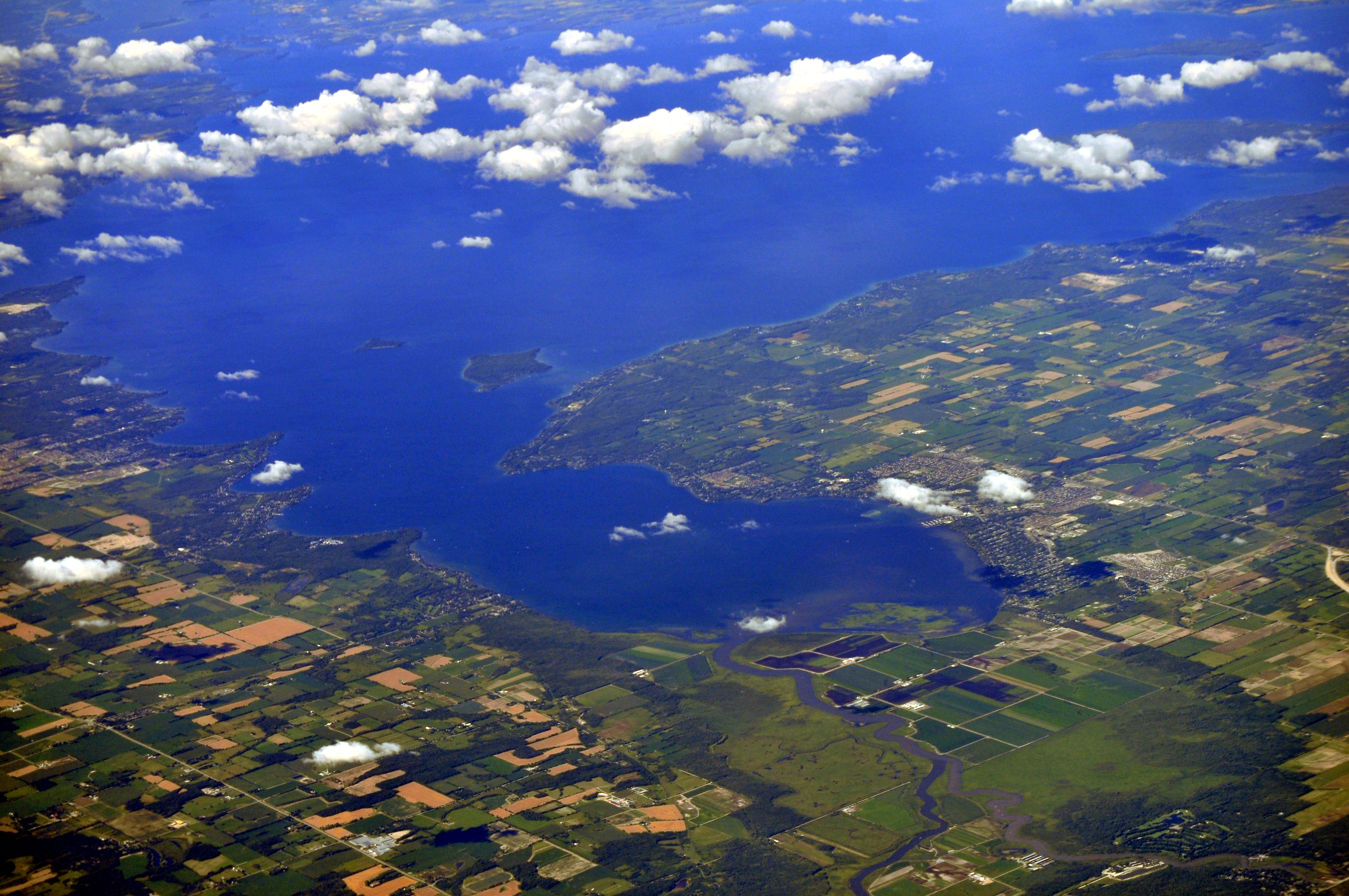
Holland River enters Cook's Bay in the lower portion of this 2013 aerial photo

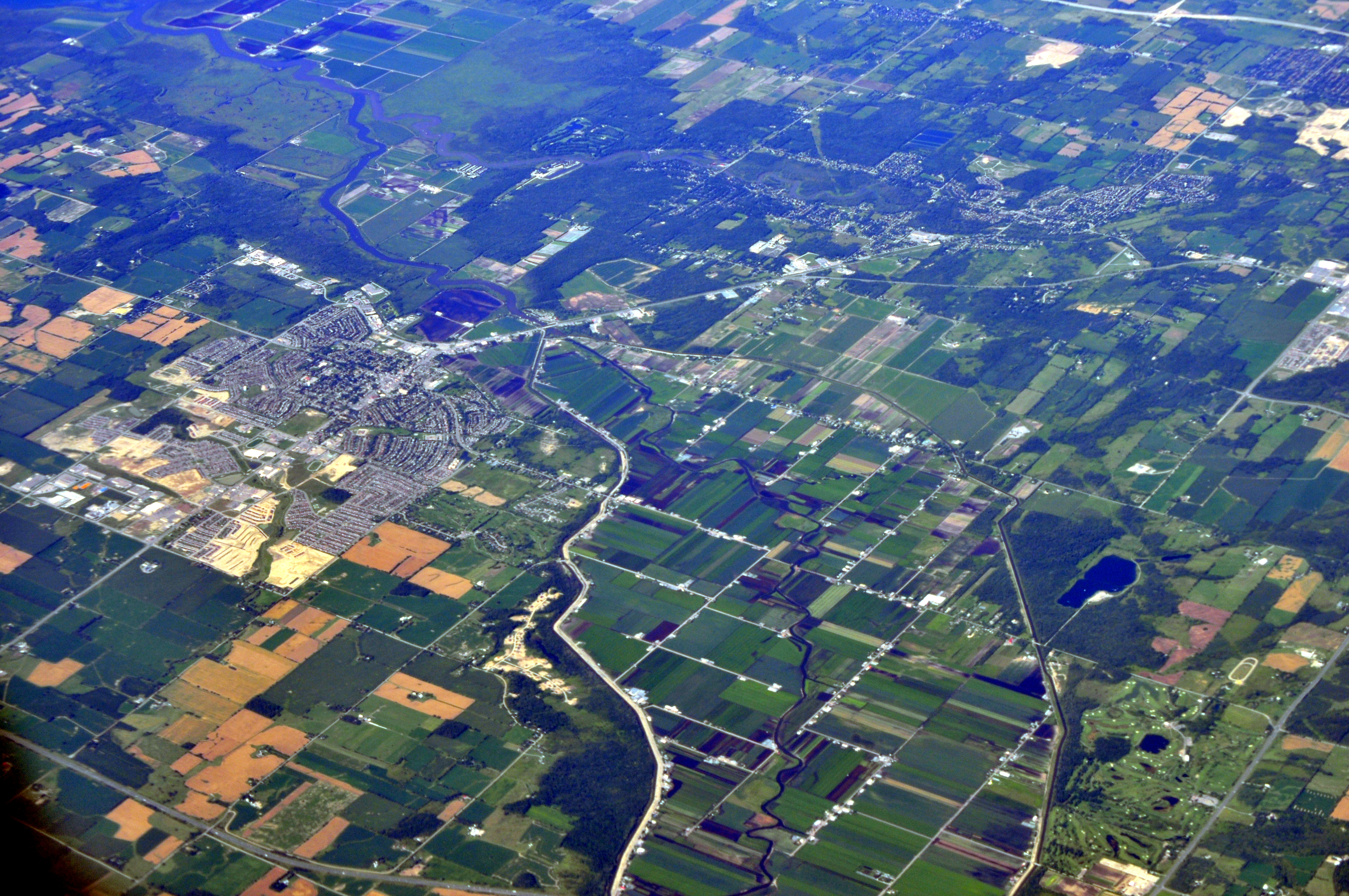
Aerial view of Holland River as it approaches Cook's Bay (2013)

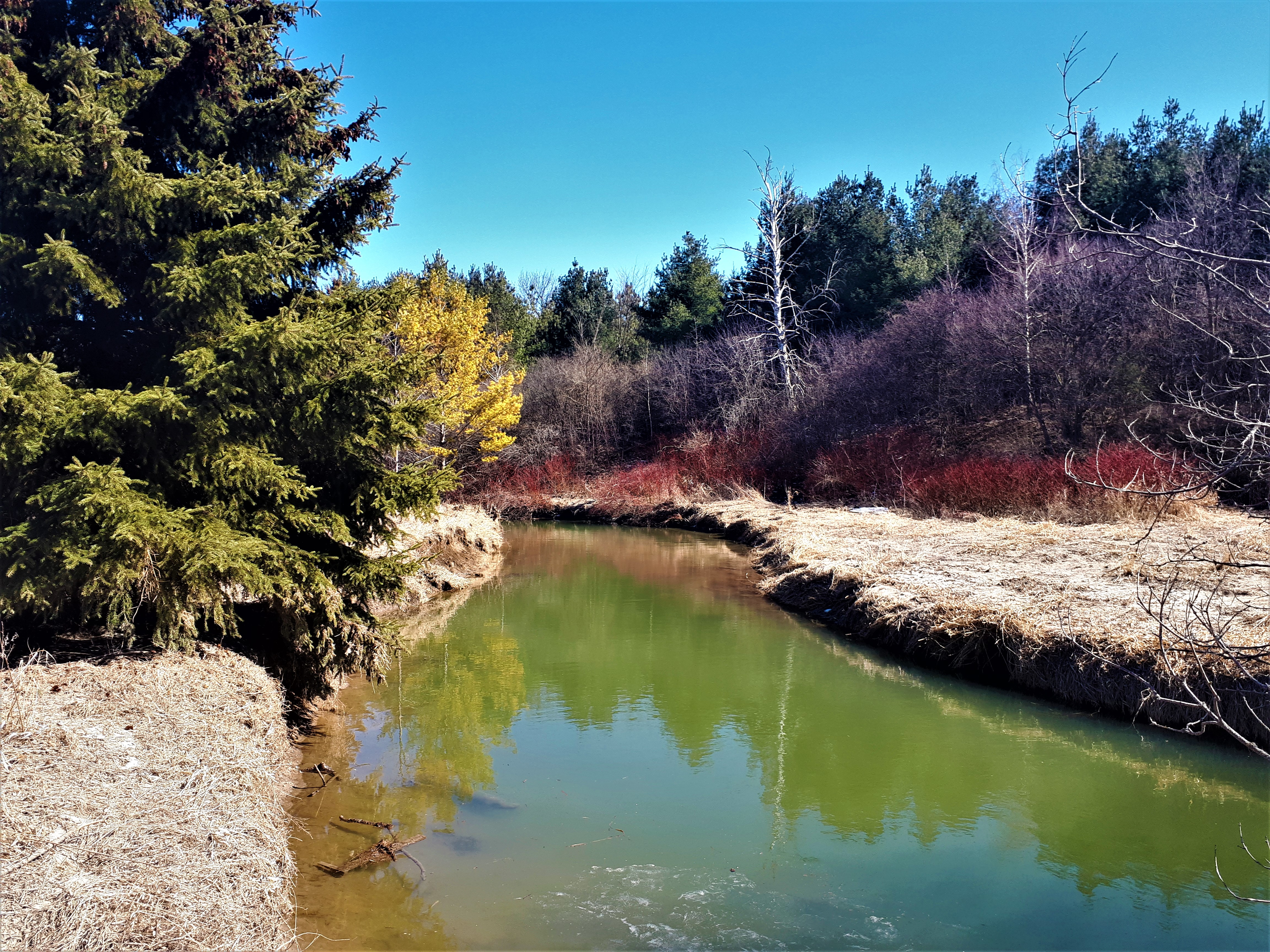
Holland River, Newmarket

The Holland River is a river in Ontario, Canada, that drains the Holland River watershed into Cook's Bay, the southern extremity of Lake Simcoe. The river flows generally north, and its headwaters lie in the Oak Ridges Moraine. The Holland River watershed is approximately 600 square kilometres (230 mi^{2}), spanning an area that includes New Tecumseth, King Township, Newmarket, Aurora, East Gwillimbury, and Whitchurch-Stouffville. The river's watershed also contains the Holland Marsh, a fertile farmland region renowned for its vegetable production.

The river was originally known as Micicaquean Creek, its indigenous name. It was renamed by Lieutenant-Governor Simcoe after Captain Samuel (Johannes) Holland, (1729–1801), Dutch-born first Surveyor General of British North America.

The Lake Simcoe Region Conservation Authority is responsible for leading the protection and environmental health of the Holland River, as it is within the Lake Simcoe watershed area.

== See also ==
- List of rivers of Ontario
