= King Heritage & Cultural Centre =

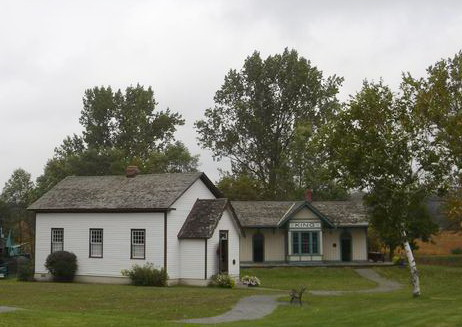
- Established: 1979
- Location: King City, Ontario, Canada
- Coordinates: 43.923615°N 79.550564°W
- Type: Municipal museum
- Key holdings: Artifacts associated with township history
- Collection size: 1800
- Owner: King Township

The King Heritage & Cultural Centre in King City, Ontario, Canada is a local history museum for the township of King at 2920 King Road.

It was previously known as Kinghorn Museum, and is located on what was once known as Kinghorn, now subsumed by King City. Its name was changed to King Township Museum when its operation was transferred from the King Township Historical Society to the municipal government of King in 2000, and to its current name in 2014. It is operated by the King Township Community Services Department.

The Museum is affiliated with the Canadian Museums Association (CMA), the Canadian Heritage Information Network (CHIN), and the Virtual Museum of Canada.

The King Heritage & Cultural Centre houses the King Township Historical Society, Arts Society King, the township archives, the township museum collection and two exhibition galleries, a performance hall, and four historic buildings.

== Campus ==
The museum consists of a building which houses the majority of collections held. This building was originally built in 1861 as the site of the Kinghorn School SS #23. It was updated and expanded in 1958 and again in 1963, and purchased by the township in 1978. The township gave operational control of the building to the King Township Historical Society, which established the museum in 1979 and opened it in 1982. The museum was operated on a volunteer basis until 2001, when the township municipal government assumed control of the museum. The government established a management board, to which individuals are appointed by the township council.

In 2012, a 749 square feet (69.6 m^{2}) addition was built by the real estate development company Genview Homes, which leased it and used it as its sales office for a development adjacent to the museum grounds in exchange for repairing or upgrading damaged parts of the building. The flat, leaky roof was rebuilt as a peaked roof. Once vacated by Genview, the space may be used for various services, such as a lecture hall with a capacity of 60 to 80 guests.

On the grounds of the 2.5 acre property owned by the museum are several heritage sites. The King Township Historical Society raised funds to acquire and move King Station from Black Creek Pioneer Village to the grounds in 1989, where it now fronts King Road. It was the original railway station building of Springhill (now King City), and believed to be the oldest surviving railway station in Canada, built by the Ontario, Simcoe and Huron Railway in 1852 and first served passengers in 1853. The single-storey board and batten structure was in poor shape when it was acquired by the museum, and restoration began soon after to repair the damage. It was painted green and grey after the initial restoration, and is now painted cream yellow with green trim. It is the only surviving station building of the original Ontario, Simcoe and Huron Railway buildings.

The other heritage building is the King Christian Church built in 1851 by local community members with Quaker and Loyalist backgrounds. It was renamed to the King Emmanuel Baptist Church in 1931 and permanently closed in 1978. It was moved from its original location at Kettleby Road and Jane Street to the museum grounds in 1982.

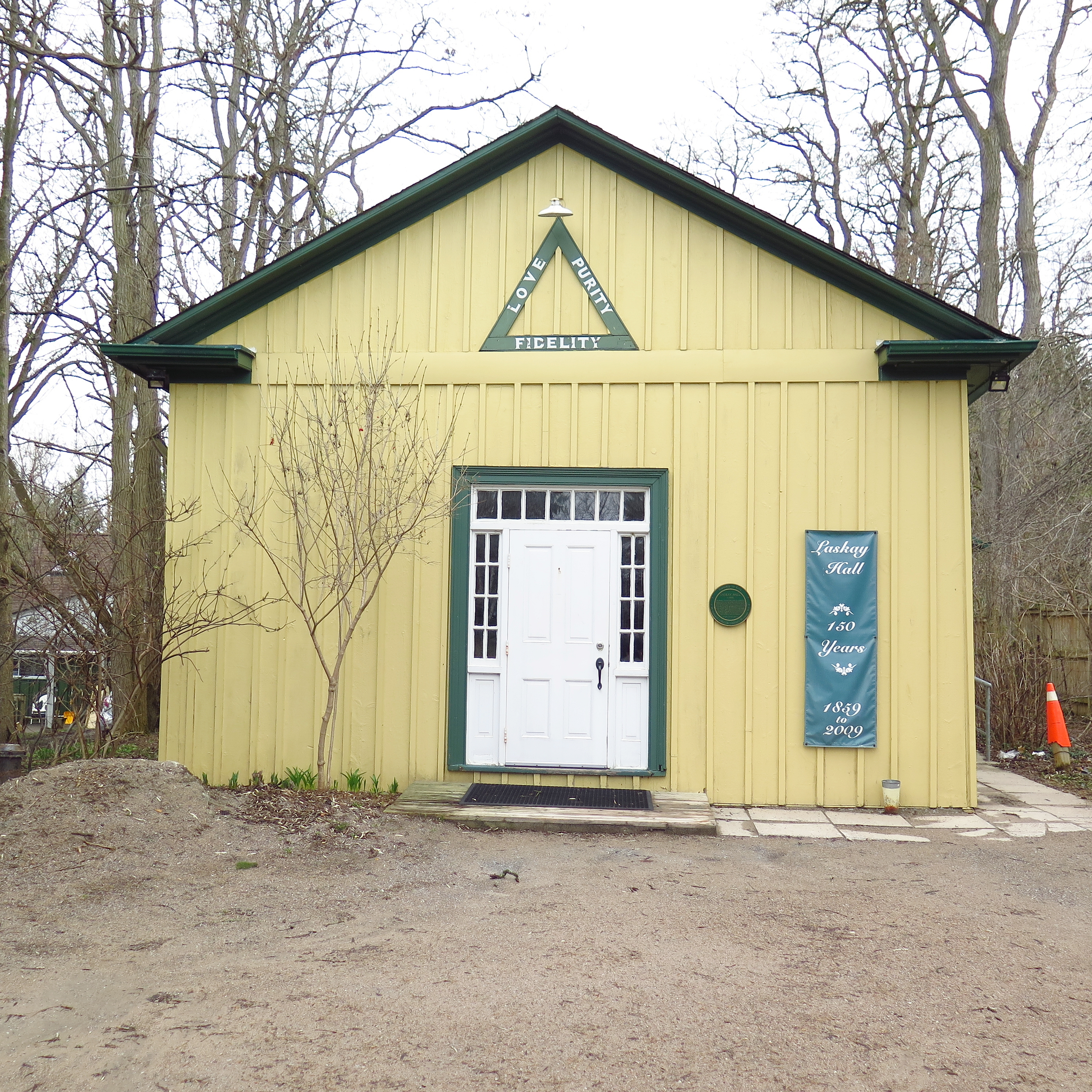
Laskay Hall in 2017, before it was moved to the museum grounds

In August 2017, Laskay Hall was moved to the site from its original location in Laskay. It will be used for cultural programs such as art, music, dance, and theatre; an event venue for Laskay residents; a performing arts space; and as an additional exhibit for the museum. A basement will eventually be built for it, which will be used for storage by the museum and Arts Society King.

The site also contains a dredge built in the 1970s that was used to clear the canals of the Holland Marsh until the 1990s, and was obtained by the museum in 2001.

== Collections and programs ==
The museum collection contains over 1,800 artifacts associated with the township's history, such as books, clothing, tools, and other household items.

King Heritage & Cultural Centre operates a variety of March break and summer camps, and established an Art Camp and Puppet Theatre Camp in 2006. Since 2006, the museum has hosted Music at the Museum, a weekly concert showcasing local musical talent.

Works of local and regional artists are also exhibited by the museum.

== Events ==
The museum conducts several annual events, including a trunk sale, a fundraising antique appraisal, an appreciation barbecue for its volunteers, and a garden tea hosted by the Nobleton and King City Horticultural Society at the beginning of summer. It participates in Doors Open and the Arts Society of King studio tour, and hosts Christmas and Halloween celebrations.

The church may be rented for small weddings.

One-time events hosted by the museum include a reenactment of the 1837 Upper Canada Rebellion, retracing the route of the rebels from Lloydtown to Toronto. The six-hour tour stopped at the rebel statue in Lloydtown, Gibson House in North York, and Mackenzie House in Toronto.

== Other ==
The most famous person associated with the museum is Walter Rolling, who taught at the schoolhouse for over 40 years. The school was originally one room, but was expanded later. In the late 1970s, the school was converted into what is now the King Heritage & Cultural Centre.

In 2012, the museum board undertook a program to create a 5-10 year strategic business plan to replace the ad-hoc volunteer administration plan. As part of the project, physical accessibility to the museum will be improved and business hours extended.

It will also change the administrative structure to eliminate board appointments by the township council, replacing the board with a community museum board.

In late 2011, the museum received a bequest of CA$400,000.
