= Ansnorveldt, Ontario =

Ansnorveldt
- Unincorporated community
- Location within Canada Location within Ontario Location within North America
- Coordinates: 44°04′49″N 79°32′24″W
- Country: Canada
- Province: Ontario
- Regional Municipality: York
- Township: King

Government
  - Township mayor: Steve Pellegrini
  - MP: Scot Davidson
  - MPP: Caroline Mulroney
  - Councillor: Avia Eek (Ward 6)
- Time zone: UTC-5 (EST)
  - Summer (DST): UTC-4 (EDT)
- Forward sortation area: L0G
- Area codes: 905 and 289
- NTS Map: 031D04
- GNBC Code: FADHQ

Ansnorveldt is a hamlet located at the northeastern extent of King Township, in Ontario, Canada. It is located in the Holland Marsh, north of Highway 9. Whereas most of King township is in the Oak Ridges—Markham electoral district, Ansnorveldt and all other portions of King north of Highway 9 are part of the York—Simcoe electoral district, represented federally by Scot Davidson of the Conservative Party of Canada and provincially by Caroline Mulroney of the Progressive Conservative Party of Ontario.

== Geography ==
Located in the fertile Holland Marsh, the area is considered to be the Breadbasket of Ontario. The Ansnorveldt Wetland Complex, which is a provincially significant wetland area, is located on the edge of the Holland Marsh; its southern extent reaches the northern slopes of the geologically important Oak Ridges Moraine. The wetlands in the complex are hydrologically connected along a discharge zone at the base of the Oak Ridges Moraine.

== History ==
Ansnorveldt is a contraction of the Dutch "An Snor's Veldt" meaning "On Snor's Field" after John Snorr, a pioneering founder of the area from Netherlands.

On October 15, 1954, Ansnorveldt was affected by Hurricane Hazel. Indeed, the hamlet was inundated with water.

In 2004, Ansnorveldt won the Provincial title of "Communities in Bloom".

== Education and culture ==
The private King Christian School (formerly called the Holland Marsh District Christian School), affiliated with the Ontario Alliance of Christian Schools, was located in the hamlet, until 2015, when they relocated to a new location on Bathurst Street in East Gwillimbury. The Ansnorveldt Public Library, a branch of the King Township Public Library, is located in the Hamlet and provides residents with 24/7 self-service pickup of library materials.

== See also ==
- List of unincorporated communities in Ontario
