= Cook's Bay (Ontario) =

Bay in Ontario, Canada

- Location within Ontario

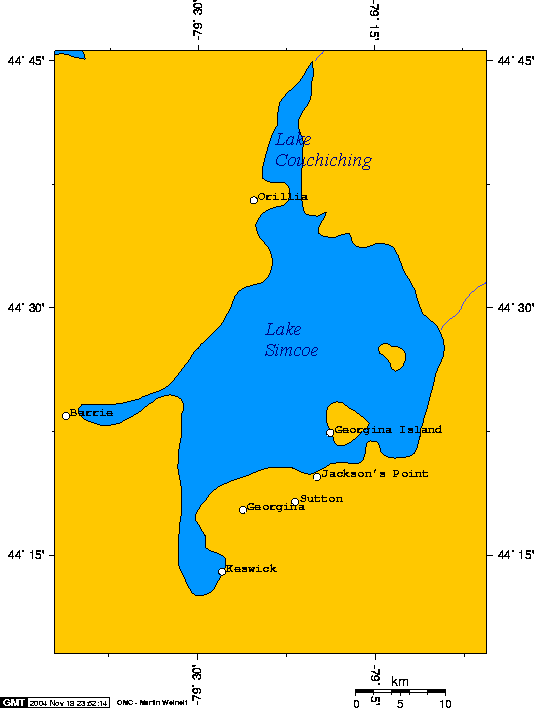
- Cook's Bay is the southernmost bay in Lake Simcoe
- Location: Ontario, Canada
- Coordinates: 44°14′N 79°30′W
- Type: bay
- Etymology: James Cook
- Primary inflows: Holland River; Maskinonge River
- Settlements: Keswick

Cook's Bay is the southernmost bay of Lake Simcoe in Ontario, Canada. Most of the southern part of the bay is within the jurisdiction of Georgina, a town in the Regional Municipality of York. Its western end is in Simcoe County, and a small portion from the mouth of the Holland River to the Simcoe County border is within Bradford West Gwillimbury. The largest community on the shores of the bay is Keswick.

It was named by John Graves Simcoe, the first Lieutenant-Governor of Upper Canada, for James Cook, who had served as master aboard HMS Pembroke in 1759 under the command of Captain John Simcoe, the Lieutenant-Governor's father.

The bay is used for fishing, and is especially known for yellow perch. It attracts windsurfers and kitesurfers throughout the year, and its northern end features many cottages that are part of Ontario's cottage country. Marinas and motel accommodations are available.
