= King Township Public Library =

Public library system in Ontario, Canada

- 43.93160°N 79.51744°W (King City branch)
- Location: King City, Ontario, Canada
- Type: Public library
- Branches: 4

Collection
- Items collected: business directories, phone books, maps, government publications, books, periodicals, genealogy, local history

Other information
- Director: Adele Reid (2022)
- Website: www.kinglibrary.ca

The King Township Public Library is a public library system that serves King Township, Ontario in Canada. It consists of four branches located in King City, Nobleton, Schomberg, and Ansnorveldt.

The library rotates certain books through the various branches to ensure all residents in the township have equal access to volumes held.

Collections include government works (e.g. federal budgets), annual reports, and maps. Periodicals and newspapers are archived for a short period of time. The King Township Archives were maintained at the King City branch until they were transferred to the King Heritage & Cultural Centre in the 2020s.

== Services ==
The library system offers a number of programs for children and adults, plus language kits and multi-lingual books. A limited selection of music CDs and movie DVDs are available for loan in addition to book circulation.

- Information and reference services
- Access to full text databases
- Community information
- Internet access
- Reader's advisory services
- Programs for children, youth and adults
- Delivery to homebound individuals
- Interlibrary loan
- Free downloadable audiobooks

== History ==
James Whitling Crossley established the first library in King, the King City Mechanics and Library Association, which opened in 1893 in King City, and was housed in his office. In 1947, the King Memorial Library was established by members of the Women's Institute, and named to commemorate the local soldiers who died during World War II. It was a privately operated library supervised by Marjorie Jarvis, who had been president of the Ontario Library Association in 1935—1936. It was located at Memorial Park in King City, first in an old barn, and later into a dedicated building. Its collection included about 1000 items. In 1956, the library was moved to 45 Springhill Road (now King Road) following a referendum of municipal taxpayers to operate it as a public library, and was named the King City Memorial Library. In 1969, its operations were merged into the Township of King Central Library, which received most of the collection of the private library. A new King City branch building was opened on 10 January 1970, on which day it received donations of many items, including a water colour painting of the previous building.

In 1930, a library was established in Schomberg, serving the growing communities in the northeastern portion of the township. The Nobleton branch first opened to the public in 1968. In 1990, a fundraising campaign was established to build a branch building in Ansnorveldt. The 768 square feet (71.3 m^{2}) building cost CA$48,000 to build, of which one third was funded by a government of Ontario grant, one third by the municipal government, and the remaining one third was raised by the community, including CA$3,000 by students of the nearby school.

In 1976 and 1977, a dispute arose between the library board and the King Township Council regarding development of land adjacent to the King City branch into a lumber depot. The library opposed the rezoning of the property, leading to two Ontario Municipal Board hearings and an appeal to the Ontario High Court of Justice before plans for the lumber depot were abandoned.

In December 2016, a press release issued by the township municipal government stated that the King City branch would be expanded from 7,800 square feet (720 m^{2}) to 20,000 square feet (1,900 m^{2}). The structure would also be expanded to include a senior's centre, which would move from its location adjacent to the community centre. It was expected to be completed in late 2018. The township issued a request for tender in 2017, but all six applications received by the November deadline exceeded the specified $9.05 million budget. In 2018 the request for tender was re-issued after the architectural designs were modified to reduce costs, and all twelve submissions once again exceeded the preliminary budget; the contract was awarded because township staff believed "that it is highly unlikely further delay will result in better pricing". The awarded construction contact is valued at $8,426,500, with a total project budget of $10,764,000. Funding will consist of $5,393,052 from development charges, $3 million from the issue of a debenture, and about $600,000 from reserves. The township also purchased 0.45 acres of land of the adjacent King City Public School from the York Region District School Board, which it will merge with the King City Library property.

The King City Library closed at the end of regular hours on 28 July 2018, after which it was moved to the lower level of the King City Seniors Centre and reopened on 4 September 2018. The new building was opened in November 2021.

== Buildings ==
The current King City branch building at 1970 King Road is 1,951 square metres (21,000 sq ft) and is attached to the King City Seniors’ Centre opposite King City Secondary School. Amenities include areas for children and teens, meeting and study spaces, a reading lounge, and a makerspace.

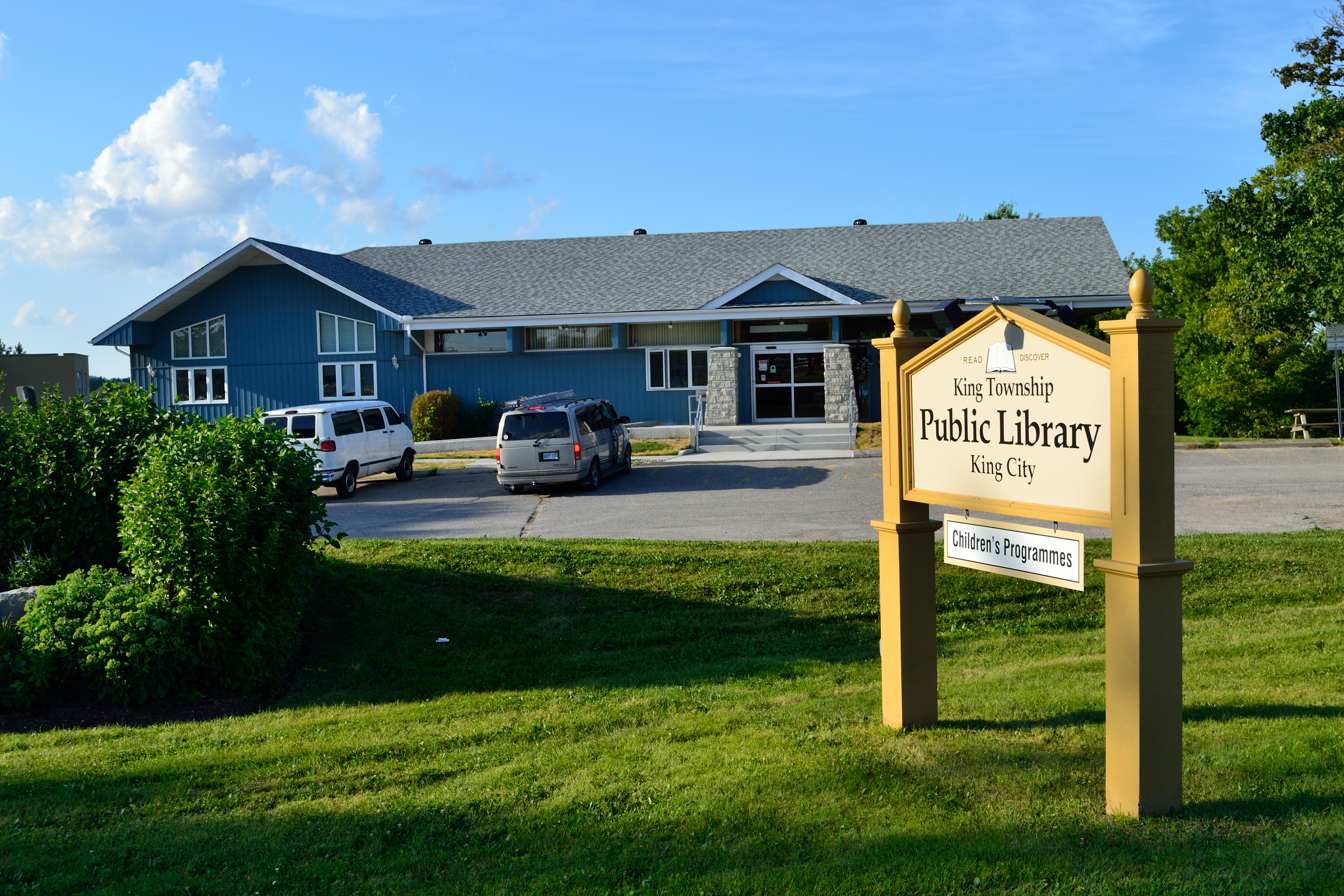
The former building of the King City branch of the King Township Public Library was demolished in 2018

The building it replaced was designed by Dennis Bowman and built in 1970 at a cost of CA$84,000 (equivalent to $679,448 in 2025). The building was built into a hill, the lower floor at its rear overlooking a playground on the east side of King City Public School, and the upper floor level with the parking lot and King Road. The entry foyer was on the upper level, and incorporated a wood and wool mural, the wood components of which consisted of a variety of woods, including panga panga, redwood, maple, and teak. The interior was supported by Douglas fir beams spanning the upper floor.

The single-floor Nobleton branch building was opened in 1987. It is located at 8 Sheardown Drive where it intersects with Highway 27, across from Nobleton Plaza.

The entrance of the single-floor Schomberg branch building is on the north side of the building. The building is located at 77 Main Street.

The groundbreaking ceremony for the Ansnorveldt branch of the library was performed by the chairman of the King Township Public Library Margaret Smithyes and councillor for Holland Marsh Bob Vooberg. The building is located at 18977 Dufferin Street, adjacent to Andnorveldt Park. The collections are on the main floor, and a second floor is used for meetings and storage.

== Statistics ==
According to the 2014 "King Township Public Library Facilities Master Plan". Data is for 2012.

	Ansnorveldt	King City	Nobleton	Schomberg
Building area	1,536 square feet (142.7 m^{2})	7,553 square feet (701.7 m^{2})	5,162 square feet (479.6 m^{2})	3,121 square feet (290.0 m^{2})
Hours open per week	13	60	35	42
Items held	7,764	29,166	15,398	19,671
Annual circulation	13,758	64,454	28,380	48,3437
Annual visits	10,277	44,773	20,272	45,228

== See also ==
- Ontario Public Libraries
- Ask Ontario
