= King, Ontario =

King
- Township (lower-tier)
- Township of King
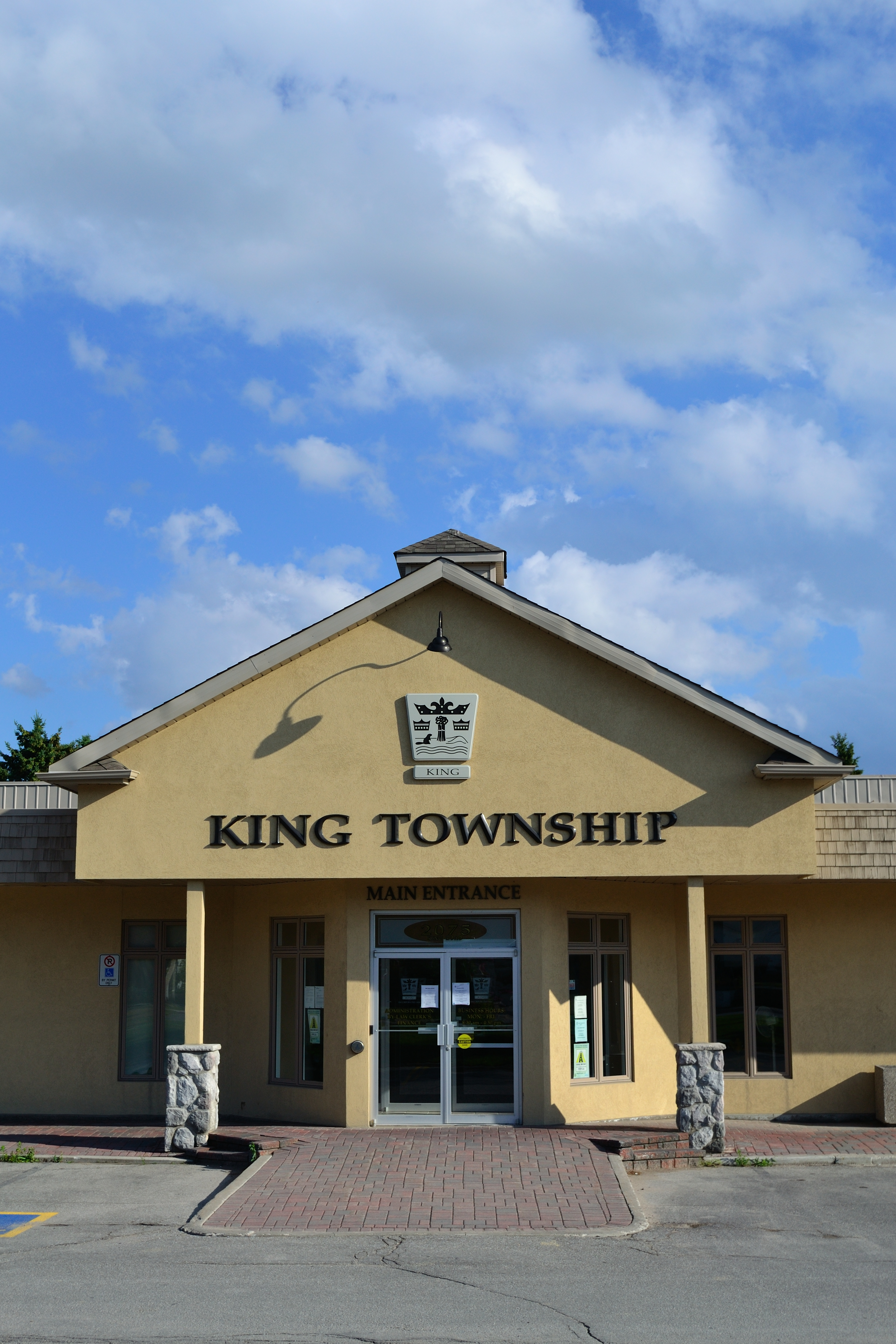
- The former township offices at King City Plaza

- Location of King within York Region

- Location within Southern Ontario
- Coordinates: 44.04630°N 79.60440°W
- Country: Canada
- Province: Ontario
- Regional Municipality: York Region
- Settled: 1800
- Incorporated
  - Township: 1850

Government
  - Mayor: Steve Pellegrini

Area
  - Total: 333.12 km^{2} (128.62 sq mi)

Population (2021)
  - Total: 27,333
  - Density: 82.3/km^{2} (213/sq mi)
- Time zone: UTC−5 (EST)
  - Summer (DST): UTC−4 (EDT)
- Forward sortation area: L0G and L7B
- Area codes: 905, 289, 365, and 742
- Website: www.king.ca

King (2021 population 27,333) is a township in York Region north of Toronto, within the Greater Toronto Area in Ontario, Canada.

The rolling hills of the Oak Ridges Moraine are the most prominent visible geographical feature of King. The Holland Marsh, considered to be Ontario's "vegetable basket", straddles King Township and Bradford West Gwillimbury. King is known for its horse and cattle farms.

Though King is predominantly rural, most of its residents inhabit the communities of King City, Nobleton, and Schomberg.

== History ==
Around 15,000 years ago, a prehistoric lake named Lake Schomberg covered the Lake Simcoe Lowlands, including most of modern-day King Township as far south as the moraine line near Nobleton. The water level of this lake was perhaps as high as 120 meters above the current level of Lake Simcoe. Lake Schomberg eventually drained and was succeeded by Lake Algonquin around 14,000 years ago, which saw somewhat of a retreat of the waters. However, a geographic feature named the Schomberg embayment was left behind. It was a shallow bay within the lake which covered areas such as the modern-day Holland Marsh. A number of Paleo-Indian sites are situated along the former shoreline of this bay. One of the most prominent is the Zander site (BaGv-7), where projectile points, bifaces, and scrapers have been found. The stone used for the tools found at the site was from a variety of sources such as near modern-day Collingwood, Bobcaygeon, Ancaster, and possibly more distant locations. Based on geographic elements such as position of the former lakeshore, the site's occupation would likely date to no earlier than 11,200 BP, and continued through to the Late Paleo-Indian period.

There is some evidence of a large Wendat (Huron) encampment at Hackett Lake. Residents in the area in the 1950s and 1960s discovered arrowheads and other archaeological items indicating a Wendat presence. This is consistent with the fact that the Toronto Carrying-Place Trail, a major route used in the 17th and 18th centuries, passes through the township. The route was used by explorer Étienne Brûlé, who first travelled along the trail with twelve Wendat guides in 1615.

Lieutenant-Governor John Graves Simcoe named King Township for John King (1759–1830), an English Under-Secretary of State for Home Office from 1794 to 1801 for the Home Department in the Portland administration when Robert Jenkinson, 2nd Earl of Liverpool was Secretary of State.

The township was created as part of the subdivision of York County, itself a subdivision of the Home District. The lands were originally acquired by the British in an agreement with the Mississaugas, known as the Toronto Purchase; it was enacted in British parliament as the Toronto Purchase Act in 1787. Acquisition of the lands for the townships of Etobicoke, King, Vaughan, and York, Upper Canada was completed at a meeting between the Mississaugas and the British at the Credit River on 1 August 1805, where 250,808 acres (1,014.98 km^{2}) were exchanged for £1,700.

Simcoe planned Yonge Street, which was built between 1793 and 1796 by the Queen's Rangers. The first seven land patents were issued in 1797. By 1801, Timothy Rogers, a Loyalist from Vermont, had travelled the road and found an area on its western boundary immediately southwest of Newmarket very appealing. He applied for and received a grant for land totalling 40 farms, each of 200 acres (0.8 km^{2}), and subsequently returned to Vermont to recruit families to operate those farms. By February 1802, he had set out for King Township with the first group of settlers for those forty farms. A second group followed later that month.

The area would become known as Armitage, in honour of its first settler Amos Armitage. It was the first of King's settlements, and now part of Newmarket. Soon after the establishment of Armitage, the communities of Kettleby and Lloydtown were established to the west. More settlers arrived from New York, Pennsylvania, and other Loyalist enclaves over the subsequent years to populate the region, drawn by the abundant, fertile land being apportioned relatively cheaply to newcomers. A "considerable area of land...in different concessions" of King were patented to the Canada Company after its establishment in 1826.

By 1842, the township consisted of 53,240 acres (215 km^{2}) of land, of which 13,818 acres (56 km^{2}) had been cleared and was being cultivated. The principal villages at the time were Lloydtown, Brownsville (now Schomberg), Bogarttown (now a part of Newmarket), and Tyrwhitt's Mills (now Kettleby).

In 1851, the township annexed from West Gwillimbury the portion of land north of its extant and east of the Holland River as a result of the formation of Simcoe County. Approximately 86,840 acres (351 km^{2}) of land were administered by the township in 1878, according to the Historical Atlas of York County, but by 1973 this had been reduced to 82,000; some of its land has been ceded to what are now known as Newmarket, Aurora and Oak Ridges.

The first survey of King Township was conducted in 1800 by Hessian soldier Johann Stegmann. At the time, the area's population was twenty residents. According to a letter by Benjamin Cody to the Newmarket Era published on 7 May 1892, there were church records listing births in the area, and the first white child in King may have been Sarah Rogers, born April 1800. At least four children were born in King by July 1802. By 1809, the township's population had increased sevenfold, to 160. It wasn't until 1820, with the construction of roads into the township, that its population began to grow. By 1842, the population of 2,625 residents was principally Irish, and also included those of English, Scottish, Canadian, and American descent. Further surveys were conducted in 1836–1838 by Callighan, in 1852 by John Ryan, and completed in 1859 by Whelock. The townships population grew to 5574 in 1850, and nearly 8000 in 1875, after which it declined to 4588 in 1914.

Early settlements in the area developed primarily around gristmills and sawmills. These were important economic engines in the region during the 19th century, which resulted in the establishment of other communities and businesses nearby. By 1842, there were eight grist mills and 12 saw mills in King. Some settlements have since been abandoned, or are no longer communities per se, including Bell's Lake, Davis Corners, and King Ridge.

In 1971, with the formation of the Regional Municipality of York and dissolution of York County, the township's boundaries were changed, shifting west by one concession from Yonge Street to Bathurst Street, and north by one lot from the King-Vaughan town line.

In 2017, the township lent its name to the Barenaked Ladies song "Township of King", written by band member Kevin Hearn. The lyrics allude to the construction of Canada's Wonderland, which is actually located in the City of Vaughan, several kilometres south of the Township of King's southern boundary.

== Geography ==
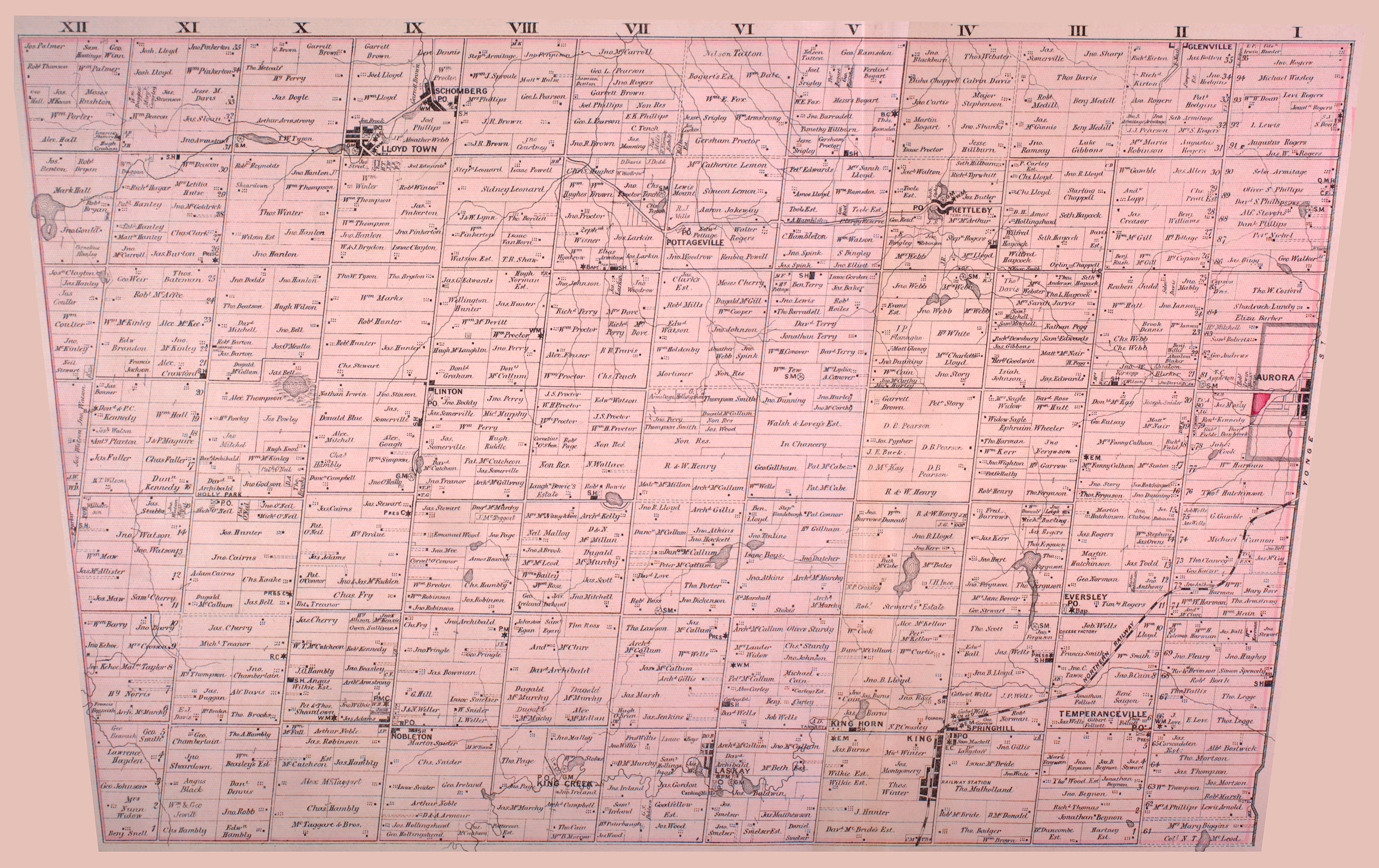
A map of the southern portion of King Township from 1878. At the time, the township's boundaries extended to Yonge Street. The area between Bathurst Street and Yonge Street, shown as lots 61–95 on the map, have since been ceded to Richmond Hill, Aurora, and Newmarket.

The township's boundaries are

- East: Bathurst Street
- South: a line north of the King-Vaughan Road
- West: the Caledon/King Townline, which connects two roads (Caledon/King Townline North and Caledon/King Townline South) in a roughly straight line
- North: Highway 9 from the Caledon/King Townline to slightly east of Highway 27, then cuts north following branches of the Holland River until it meets Bathurst Street

The majority of King is located on the Oak Ridges Moraine, which is the origin for the headwaters of many rivers throughout its extent, including the Humber River in King. Numerous interconnected provincially and regionally significant areas are located in the township. The most prominent are seven Areas of Natural and Scientific Interest, and the wetland complexes adjacent to or within those areas.

=== Climate ===
Slightly removed from the urban heat island of Toronto, the climate is warm-summer humid continental (Köppen: Dfb).

== Local government ==
The six wards of King. The varying shades of each colour represent the polling areas for that ward.

King Township was incorporated in 1850 as The Corporation of the Township of King. Its current mayor is Steve Pelligrini, who was sworn into office in December 2010. The Town Council includes the mayor and six councillors representing the township's six wards. The mayor is also a member of York Regional Council via double direct election.

=== 2018 Municipal Election ===
Mayor: Steve Pellegrini

Councillors:

- Ward 1 (Eastern King City, Eversley, Snowball, Temperanceville): Jordan Alexander Cescolini
- Ward 2 (Nobleton, King Creek, Laskay, Strange): David Boyd
- Ward 3 (Hammertown, Happy Valley, Holly Park, Linton, New Scotland): Jakob Schneider
- Ward 4 (Schomberg, Pottageville, Lloydtown): Bill Cober
- Ward 5 (Western King City, Heritage Park, Kettleby, Kinghorn): Debbie Schaefer
- Ward 6 (Ansnorveldt, Glenville and northeastern King Township): Avia Eek

=== 2014 municipal election ===
In the 2014 municipal election, the mayorship was uncontested and Steve Pellegrini was acclaimed for a second term. Cleve Mortelliti was acclaimed for Ward 1 owing to no opposing candidates. Candidates for the other wards were:

- Ward 2: Joe Buscema, David Boyd, Peter Grandilli, and Jim Streb
- Ward 3: Linda Pabst and John Workman
- Ward 4: Greg Locke and Bill Cober
- Ward 5: Chris Gafoor, Anna Roberts, and Debbie Schaeffer
- Ward 6: Avia Eek and Simon Lloyd

The elected candidates were Steve Pelligrini (acclaimed, mayor), Cleve Mortelliti (acclaimed, ward 1), David Boyd (ward 2), Linda Pabst (ward 3), Bill Cober (ward 4), Debbie Schaeffer (ward 5), and Avia Eek (ward 6).

=== Budget ===
The township draws revenues from various sources. The most significant in 2007 were municipal taxes (67.9% of revenue), fees and service charges (14.0%), water charges (4.3%), grants (3.5%) and reserves (2.9%). The most significant expenditures for 2007 were general municipal government (27.6%), recreation and culture (21.7%), transportation (17.8%), protection (16.6%) and environmental projects (11.6%).

The Township offices reside at the King City Plaza, a strip mall purchased by the municipal government in the 1990s which also has several business tenants. In 2013, the township purchased the disused former Holy Name Catholic Elementary School building and adjacent 10 acres (40,000 m^{2}) of land from the York Catholic District School Board for $2.95 million. In 2016, township planning staff announced that the 360 square metres (3,900 sq ft) school building would be redesigned for use as office space for the township, for community and non-profit groups, and to house a satellite office for the York Regional Police. In May 2016, the Police Services Board approved the King City substation and announced that a 20-year lease would be executed for use of about 280 square metres (3,000 sq ft) of space in the building. In June 2016, township staff announced the building would be destroyed in mid-2016 and replaced by a 4,050 square metres (43,600 sq ft) structure on the site at a cost of about $15 million. It will include a public-use gymnasium. The capital project will be partially financed by selling the strip mall.

=== Provincial and federal politics ===
King federal election results
Year	Liberal		Conservative		New Democratic		Green	
2021	33%	3,843	55%	6,369	6%	656	2%	189
2019	35%	4,775	50%	6,851	6%	760	7%	998

King provincial election results
Year	PC		New Democratic		Liberal		Green	
2022	60%	5,584	5%	499	25%	2,364	4%	395
2018	62%	7,177	12%	1,409	18%	2,018	7%	807

As a result of the federal electoral redistribution of 2022, starting with the 2025 federal election the township is represented solely in the House of Commons by the Member of Parliament of King—Vaughan, which is represented by Anna Roberts of the Conservative Party of Canada.

Prior to that, the township was represented in the House of Commons by the Members of Parliament of the King—Vaughan and York—Simcoe electoral districts, under the federal electoral redistribution of 2012. The portion of King north of Highway 9 was part of the York—Simcoe electoral district, meanwhile the remaining areas are part of the King—Vaughan electoral district. Previously, King was part of the Oak Ridges—Markham, created for the 2004 election because of rapid growth in York Region, and before that in the Vaughan—King—Aurora electoral district.

The provincial riding of King—Vaughan is represented by Stephen Lecce, a member of the Progressive Conservative Party of Ontario. It was created as part of Ontario's re-districting to match provincial electoral districts with their federal equivalents. King was part of the Oak Ridges—Markham electoral district from 2007 to 2018, the Vaughan—King—Aurora electoral district from 1999 to 2007, York—MacKenzie from 1995 to 1999, and York North from Confederation to 1995. The portion of King north of Highway 9 is part of the York—Simcoe electoral district, represented by Caroline Mulroney of the Progressive Conservative Party of Ontario.

== Demographics ==
Historical populations
Year	Pop.	±%
1971	13,120	—
1976	14,297	+9.0%
1981	15,553	+8.8%
1986	16,573	+6.6%
1991	18,791	+13.4%
1996	18,223	−3.0%
2001	18,533	+1.7%
2006	19,487	+5.1%
2011	19,899	+2.1%
2016	24,512	+23.2%
2021	27,333	+11.5%

In the 2021 Census of Population conducted by Statistics Canada, King had a population of 27,333 living in 8,969 of its 9,346 total private dwellings, a change of 11.5% from its 2016 population of 24,512. With a land area of 332.12 km^{2} (128.23 sq mi), it had a population density of 82.3/km^{2} (213.2/sq mi) in 2021.

Median age as of 2021 was 43.2, slightly higher than the Ontario median age of 41.6.

=== Language ===
According to 2021 census data, English is the mother tongue of 67.5% of the residents of King. Italian is the most predominant mother tongue for 8.6% of the population, followed by Russian (2.6%), Mandarin (2.0%).

=== Religion ===
As of 2021, most reported religion among the population was Christianity (69.3%), with Catholicism (47.0%) making up the largest denomination. This was followed by Islam (3.6%), Judaism (1.6%), Hinduism (1.6%), Sikhism (1.4%) and Buddhism (0.8%). 21.2% of the population did not identify with a particular religion.

=== Ethnicity ===
In 2021, Visible minorities represented 18.4% of the population. Italian Canadians make up 35.1% of the population, the largest concentration of any Canadian census subdivision.

Ethnic Origin (2021)	Population	Per cent
Italian	9,555	35.1
English	3,290	12.1
Scottish	2,530	9.3
Irish	2,495	9.2
Canadian	2,445	9.0
German	1,190	4.4
Polish	1,030	3.8
Chinese	980	3.6
East Indian	905	3.3
Portuguese	875	3.2

Panethnic groups in the Township of King (2001−2021)
Panethnic group	2021		2016		2011		2006		2001	
Panethnic group	Pop.	%	Pop.	%	Pop.	%	Pop.	%	Pop.	%
European (Note: Statistic includes all persons that did not make up part of a visible minority or an indigenous identity.)	21,955	80.7%	21,130	86.72%	18,425	93.29%	18,315	94.29%	17,885	96.7%
South Asian	1,590	5.84%	915	3.76%	190	0.96%	180	0.93%	120	0.65%
East Asian (Note: Statistic includes total responses of "Chinese", "Korean", and "Japanese" under visible minority section on census.)	1,160	4.26%	655	2.69%	315	1.59%	245	1.26%	140	0.76%
Middle Eastern (Note: Statistic includes total responses of "West Asian" and "Arab" under visible minority section on census.)	760	2.79%	450	1.85%	70	0.35%	110	0.57%	70	0.38%
African	545	2%	375	1.54%	60	0.3%	155	0.8%	105	0.57%
Southeast Asian (Note: Statistic includes total responses of "Filipino" and "Southeast Asian" under visible minority section on census.)	370	1.36%	270	1.11%	190	0.96%	135	0.69%	30	0.16%
Latin American	280	1.03%	185	0.76%	235	1.19%	55	0.28%	55	0.3%
Indigenous	240	0.88%	115	0.47%	170	0.86%	215	1.11%	45	0.24%
Other/multiracial (Note: Statistic includes total responses of "Visible minority, n.i.e." and "Multiple visible minorities" under visible minority section on census.)	315	1.16%	280	1.15%	90	0.46%	40	0.21%	60	0.32%
Total responses	27,205	99.53%	24,365	99.4%	19,750	99.25%	19,425	99.68%	18,495	99.79%
Total population	27,333	100%	24,512	100%	19,899	100%	19,487	100%	18,533	100%
Note: Totals greater than 100% due to multiple origin responses

== Transportation ==
The Township of King is located between Toronto and Barrie, stretching from Bathurst Street to just east of Highway 50. King is accessible by Highways 400, 27, 9 and 11.

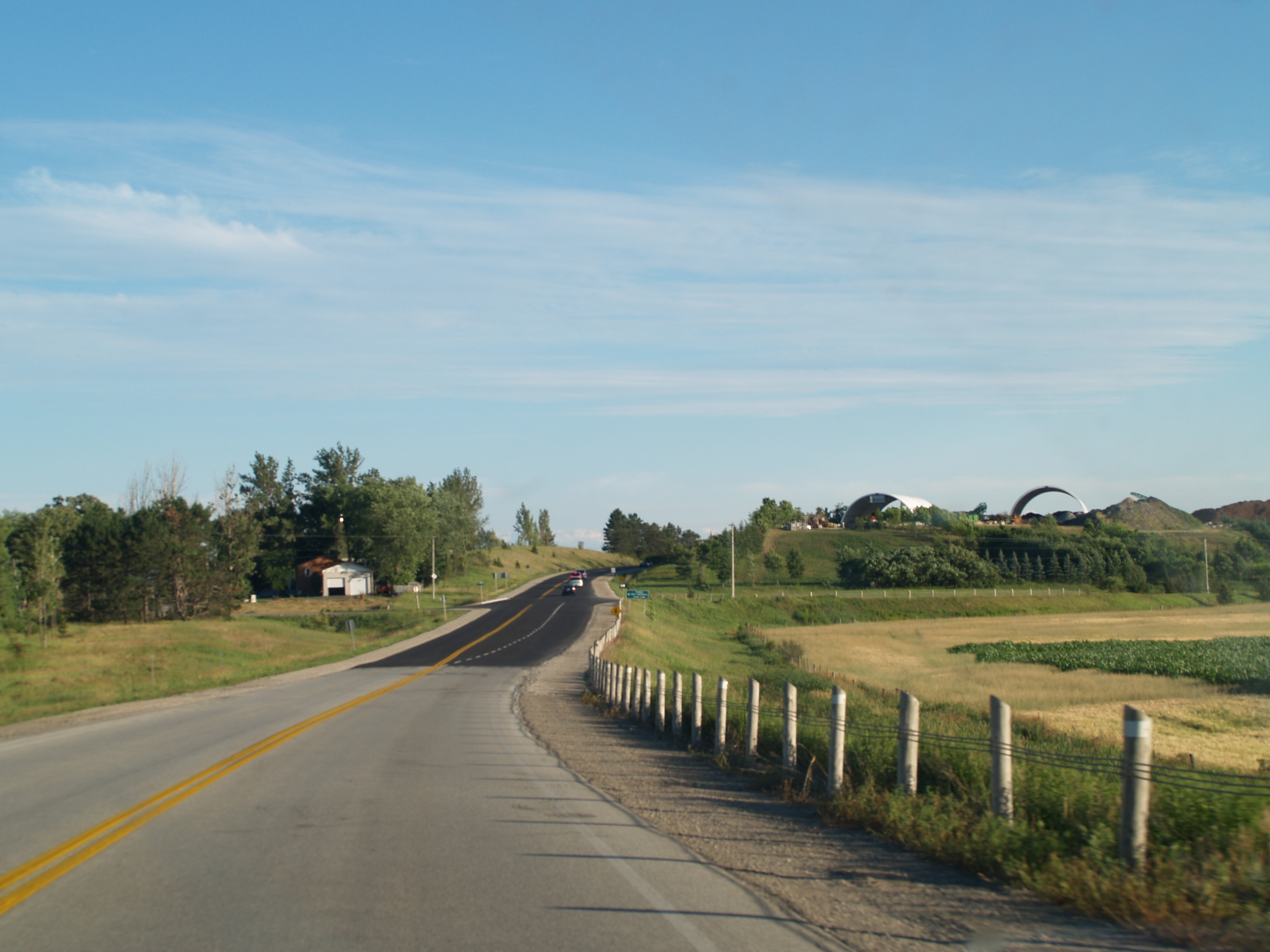
Highway 27 bypass north of Schomberg

Public transportation is provided by York Region Transit (bus service) and GO Transit (bus and train services), but their services are limited in the township due to low population density. King City GO Station is the only train station in the township. York Region Transit's services are confined to the southeastern area, and GO bus serves the Nobleton and King City communities.

Most air travel is served by Toronto Pearson International Airport, Canada's largest airport, located south of the township in Mississauga. The township's only airport, King City Airport, was a general aviation airfield that closed in the 1990s.

== Education ==
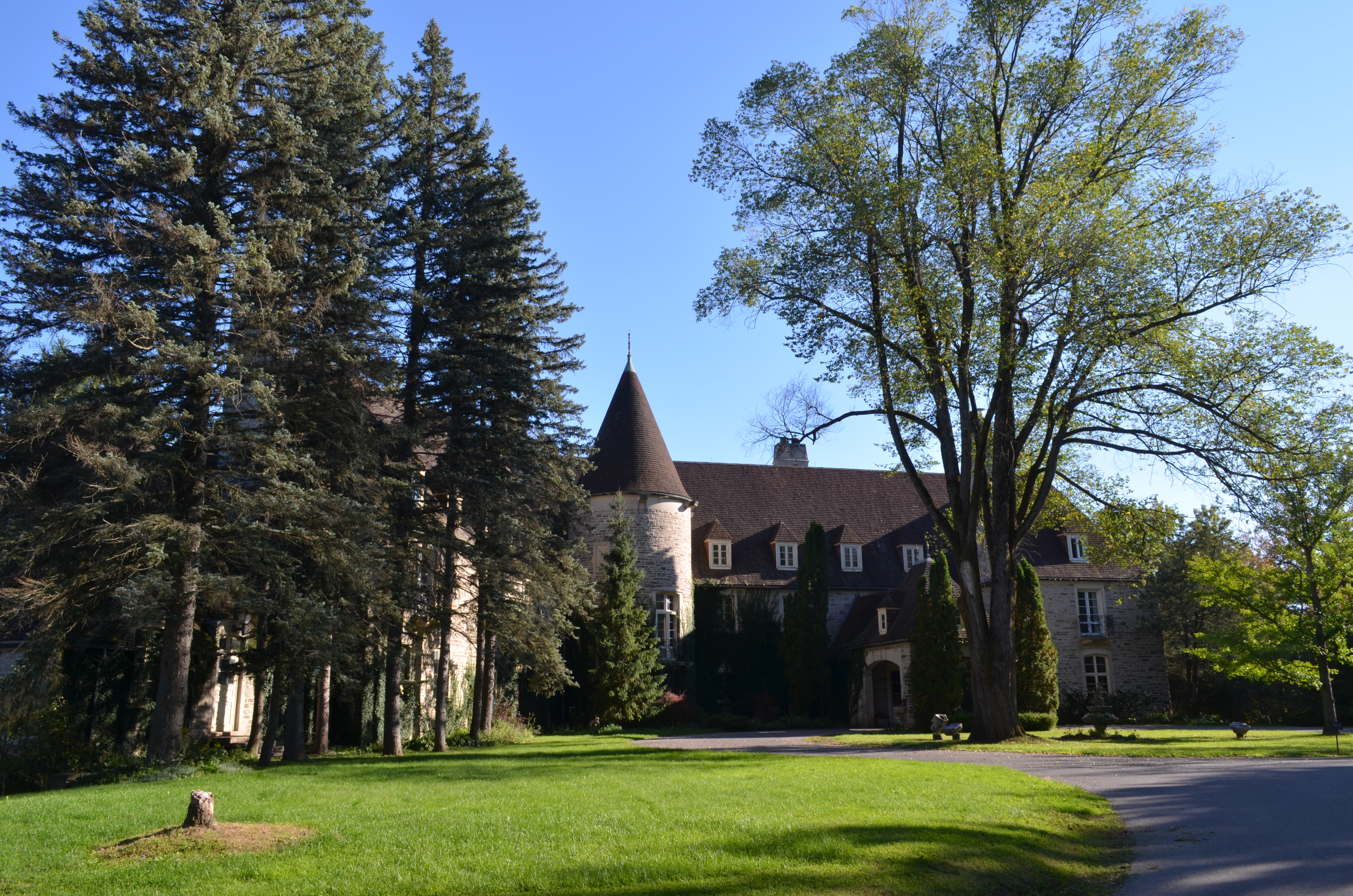
Seneca College, King Campus

Public schools with classes from kindergarten through grade twelve are administered by the York Region District School Board and the York Catholic District School Board. The only public secondary school in King, King City Secondary School, serves students residing in a relatively large geographic area, including some from adjacent towns. A private Catholic high school, St. Thomas of Villanova College, and private JK -12 school, The Country Day School, are also located in the township.

Seneca College owns a campus located in the southeastern portion of King Township, where the college offers various programs.

== Settlements ==
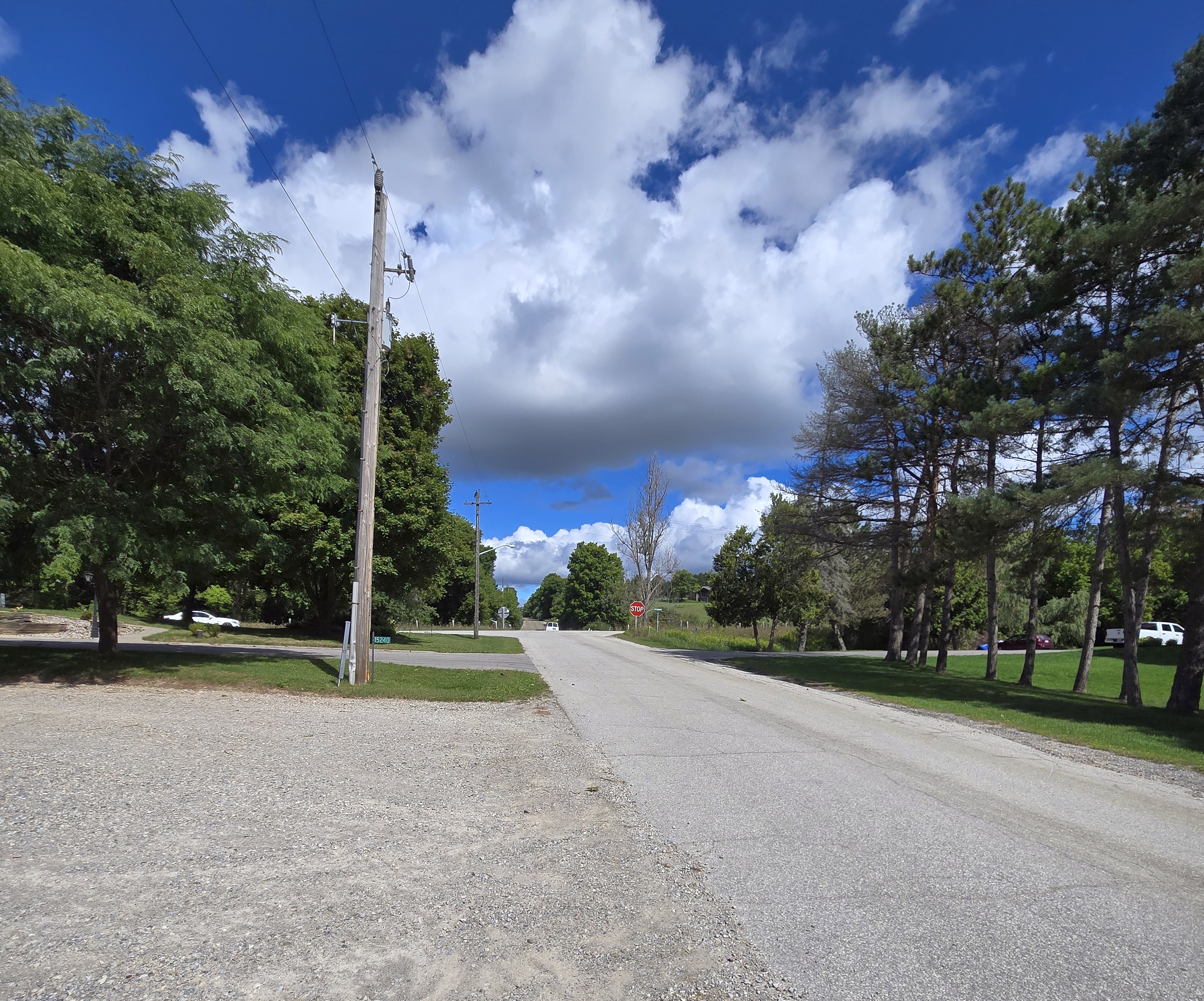
Hammertown

King's earliest settlement, Armitage, is now part of Newmarket. Its establishment was followed by those of Lloydtown and Kettleby. Subsequent settlements were founded near rivers, which provided the energy necessary to operate various mills. The earliest were based in Laskay, Kinghorn, and Eversley. The hamlet of Springhill was established later and flourished; it was renamed King City, now the largest community in the township.

- Eversley is a hamlet that, although it has its own historical development, has slowly been subsumed into King City. It lies on King City's north-eastern edge, south of Snowball. It was also known as Tinline's Corners in the 1800s.
- Glenville is a hamlet located in northeastern King, just south of the community of Ansnorveldt.
- Hammertown is a former hamlet located near the intersection of the 12th concession and 17th sideroad.
- Heritage Park is a community of King City. It is a natural and wildlife park characterized by ravines and creeks, some of which feed the East Humber River. Portions of the park are in the King City Trail.
- Kinghorn is a community of King City, located at the Jane Street-King Road intersection. It is a sparse residential area adjacent to Highway 400, and is home to the King Township Museum and The Kingbridge Centre.
- Laskay is a hamlet located just west of King City and south of the King Road—Weston Road intersection.
- Snowball is a growing hamlet located just north of Eversley, west of Aurora.

Other hamlets in King include Holly Park, Linton, and New Scotland.

== Heritage sites ==
In the township, there are eleven sites designated Heritage Sites, including:

- King Station was built in 1852 along the Northern Railway to serve Springhill (now King City). It was moved in 1989 to the grounds of the King Township Museum. It is believed to be the oldest surviving railway station in Canada, and was designated a heritage site in 1990.
- King Emmanuel Baptist Church, formerly the King Christian Church until 1931, it was moved to the grounds of the King Township Museum in 1982, and designated a heritage site in 1992.
- King City Cemetery, established in 1886, was designated a heritage site in July 2007.
- King City Cemetery Dead House built circa 1887 was designated a heritage site in 2001. It is an octagonal structure that was used to preserve the dead during the winter, during which grave-digging was not feasible. Octagonal dead houses were unique to the area bordering Yonge Street north of Toronto during the late 19th and early 20th century.
- Eversley Presbyterian Church, a stone structure built in 1848, demonstrates the Scottish influence common in the area's early development. It was designated in 1876.
- Glenville Methodist Church, a small frame structure built in 1859, which remained operational until 1952. It was designated in 1983 as a township heritage site.
- King Christian Church Cemetery was the first burial grounds for Kettleby, built in 1850. It was designated a heritage site in 1986.
- Laskay Temperance Hall, built in 1859 by the Sons of Temperance. It had been operated by the Laskay Women's Institute since 1910, and is now operated by the municipality. It was designated a Heritage Site in 1986.

== Public services ==
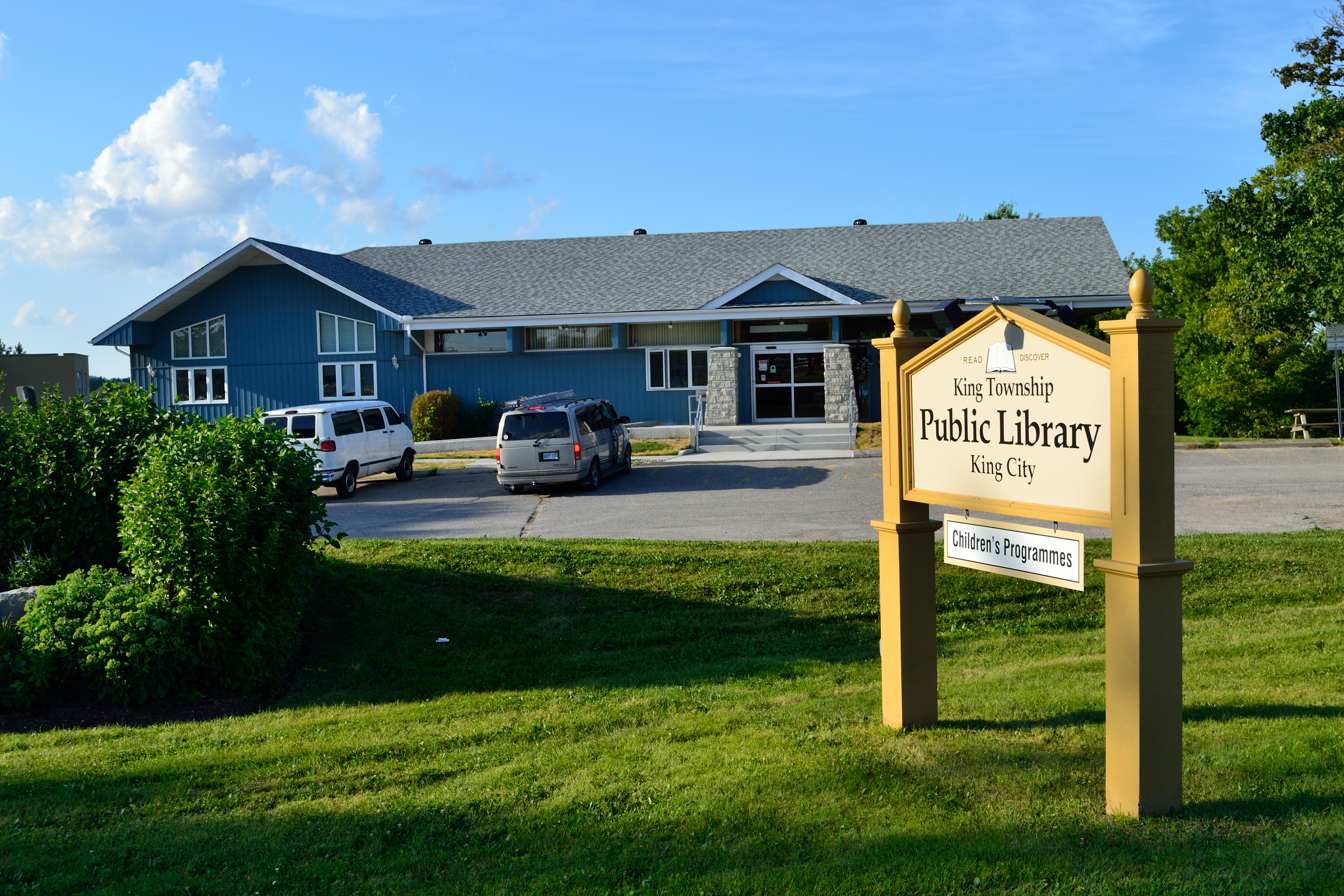
King City Library branch of the King Township Public Library System.

The township's municipal tax revenue is divided into three streams. One portion is combined with that from other municipalities for education purposes, a second portion is used to finance regional projects managed by York Region, and the last portion is used for local services.

The most significant cultural service provided via municipal funding is the King Township Public Library, which operates four branches in the township.

Waste management is provided through the region, and is co-ordinated with programs offered in other towns in York Region. Weekly green bin compost collection began in September 2007 to complement the weekly blue box collection of recyclable material; collection of all other waste was reduced to once every two weeks. Water and wastewater management is operated by the township, though these services are not available ubiquitously; some areas rely on well water and septic tanks.

== Sports ==
King was the home for several junior hockey teams, such as the King Wild and the Schomberg Cougars. King Wild competed in the Greater Metro Junior A Hockey League for four seasons until relocating to become the Vaughan Wild in 2010. The town is currently represented in the Provincial Junior Hockey League by the Schomberg Cougars, an affiliate team for the Aurora Tigers.

In 2019, Kingsman SC represented the town in the Canadian Soccer League, where they played for only a season.

== See also ==
- Kinghorn Methodist Episcopal Cemetery
- List of townships in Ontario
