= Holland Marsh =

Wetland and agricultural area in Ontario, Canada

Coordinates: 44°09′54″N 79°30′56″W

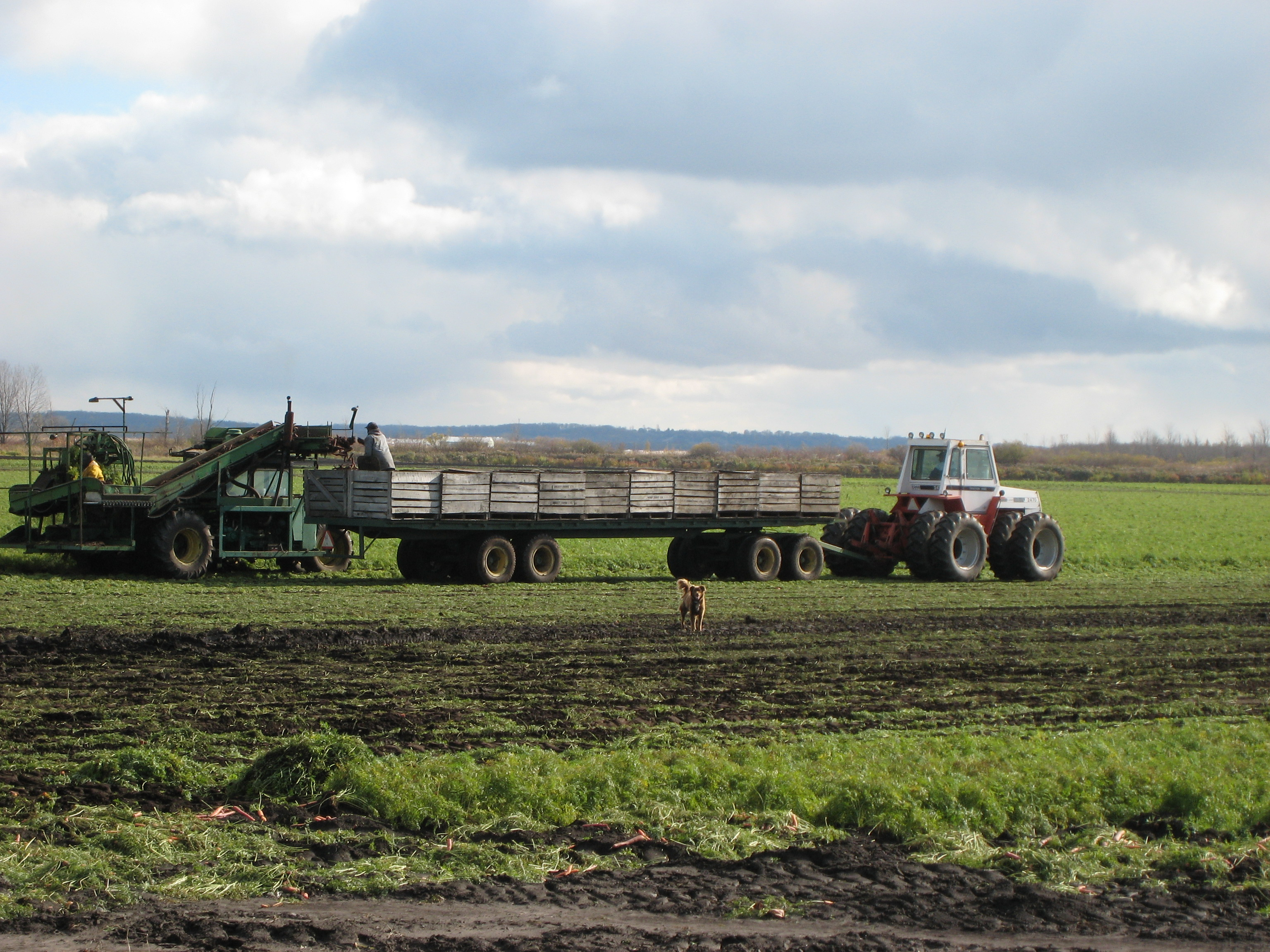
Harvesting carrots at a farm on the Holland Marsh.

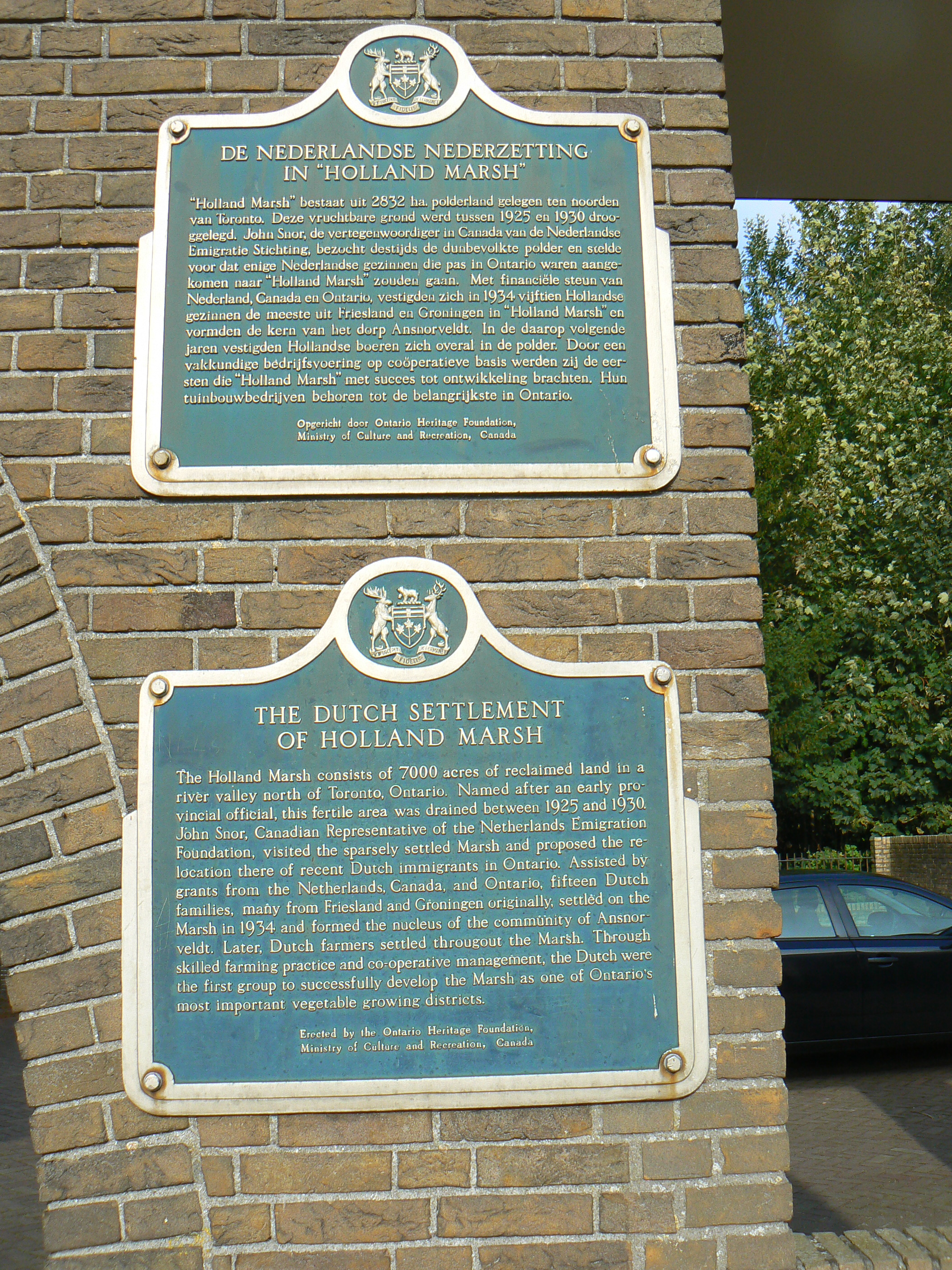
Holland Marsh Memorial plaque at the former city hall in Nieuwe Pekela, the Netherlands

The Holland Marsh is a wetland and agricultural area in Ontario, Canada, about 50 kilometres (31 mi) north of Toronto. It lies entirely within the valley of the Holland River, stretching from the northern edge of the Oak Ridges Moraine near Schomberg to the river mouth at Cook's Bay, Lake Simcoe. In its entirety it comprises about 21,000 acres (8,500 hectares), with two distinct divisions. Historically it has simply been referred to as "the marsh".

The first area to be drained and reclaimed for farming is a 7,200-acre (2,915-hectare) municipally drained polder south-west of the town of Bradford proper, of which 40% lies in King Township (York Region) and 60% in the town of Bradford West Gwillimbury (Simcoe County).

The other 13,800 acres (5,585 hectares) lie north and east of Bradford, fringing Cook's Bay in the towns of Innisfil and East Gwillimbury. Portions of this area have been privately reclaimed for farming, such as the Ravenshoe Road and Bradford Marsh areas, and portions are recreational or undisturbed wetland. In some cases, recreational boating, wetland and agricultural areas intersect.

== Agriculture ==
The flat reclaimed areas consist of fertile organic soil, ideal for growing crops such as onions, leafy greens, celery and carrots. Organic matter consists of living plant tissues and organisms found in soil. Organic matter improves the physical condition of soil, and residues from its decomposition play an important role in holding plant nutrients and water. Organic matter in soil undergoes change as it breaks down and decomposes and new material is added. Careful management of this soil is necessary to prevent wind erosion. Much of the fertile, organic soil has been depleted due to unsustainable use by farmers over the years. Submerged decayed trees contribute highly to the valuable fibrous nature of the soil, but without human assistance and ingenuity, the area would have little fertility.

The main crops of the area are vegetables which reflect each wave of immigration into Canada, and have traditionally been grown by immigrants for ethnic markets in the Greater Toronto Area and for export. The agricultural plots were originally divided into 5-acre (20,000 m^{2}) "market garden" family farms, and produce was taken to local markets. In the 1920s the main crops reflected eastern and western European tastes - yellow onions, potatoes, carrots, head lettuce, radish, etc. From the 1950s to the 1980s, Italian greens started to be grown, for example dandelion, escarole, and endive. Demand for Asian greens, such as bok choy, began in the 1990s. With the opening of Highway 400 in the 1950s, farmers quickly gained access to the Ontario Food Terminal in Toronto, vastly expanding their market. Yonge Street and CN Rail (Toronto - Barrie) are situated to the northeast. When the federal government relaxed food import rules in the 1990s and grocery stores consolidated to form large chains across Canada, small family farms growing diverse crops were, for the most part, no longer financially feasible, but a few small family farms still survive. Corporate farms that had bought land in the 1950s sold their plots and a few family farms consolidated, growing mostly onions and carrots for grocery stores, export and food processing companies. Recently the Greenbelt family farmers market introduced by the Ontario government has helped some small family farms.

At the nearby Muck Crops Research Station, located on the southernmost polder, various studies research the effects of altering specific agricultural practices. These typically focus on, and are intended for implementation, on Holland Marsh farms.

== Geography ==
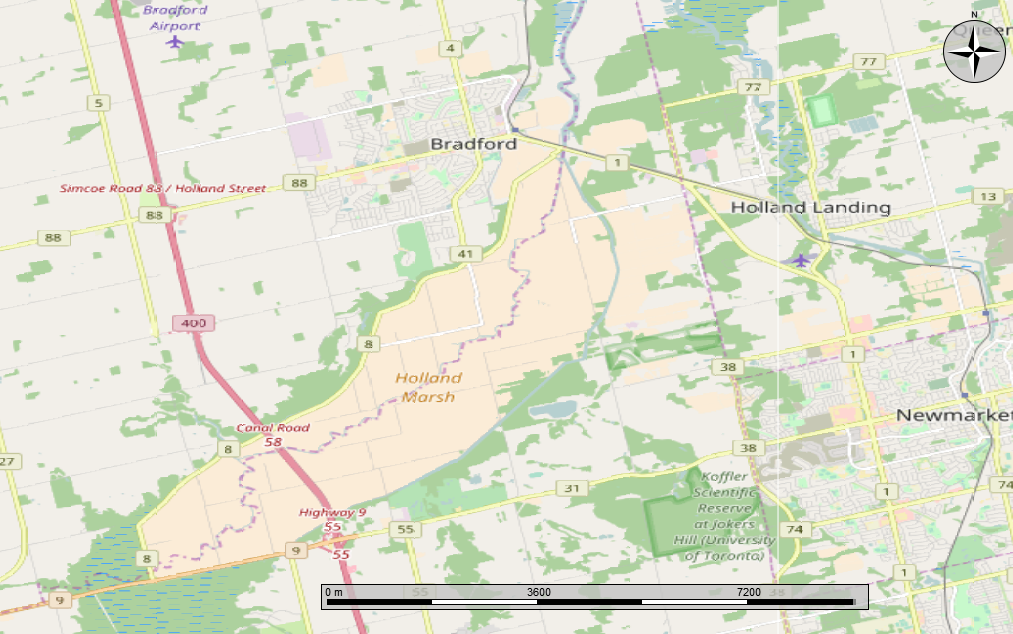
Map showing the extent of the Marsh, in pale brown.

According to the Ontario government Holland Marsh Schedule 3 Greenbelt map, all of Holland Marsh - whether designated agricultural, recreational or wetland - is a 22,000-acre (89 km^{2}) specialty soil region. The southernmost polder sits on the lowest lying, flat area, consisting of 7,200 acres (29 km^{2}), of the 816,120-acre (3,303 km^{2}) Lake Simcoe Watershed region. The area is oval shaped, with the narrowest points at the northwest and southeast. This polder's length is about 15 km and its width about 4 km. The location runs from 44 to 44.15 N and from 73.8 to about 73.65 W. The Holland River's main branch meets the polder's north and south canals near the intersection of Bridge Street and Canal Road in Bradford.

== History ==
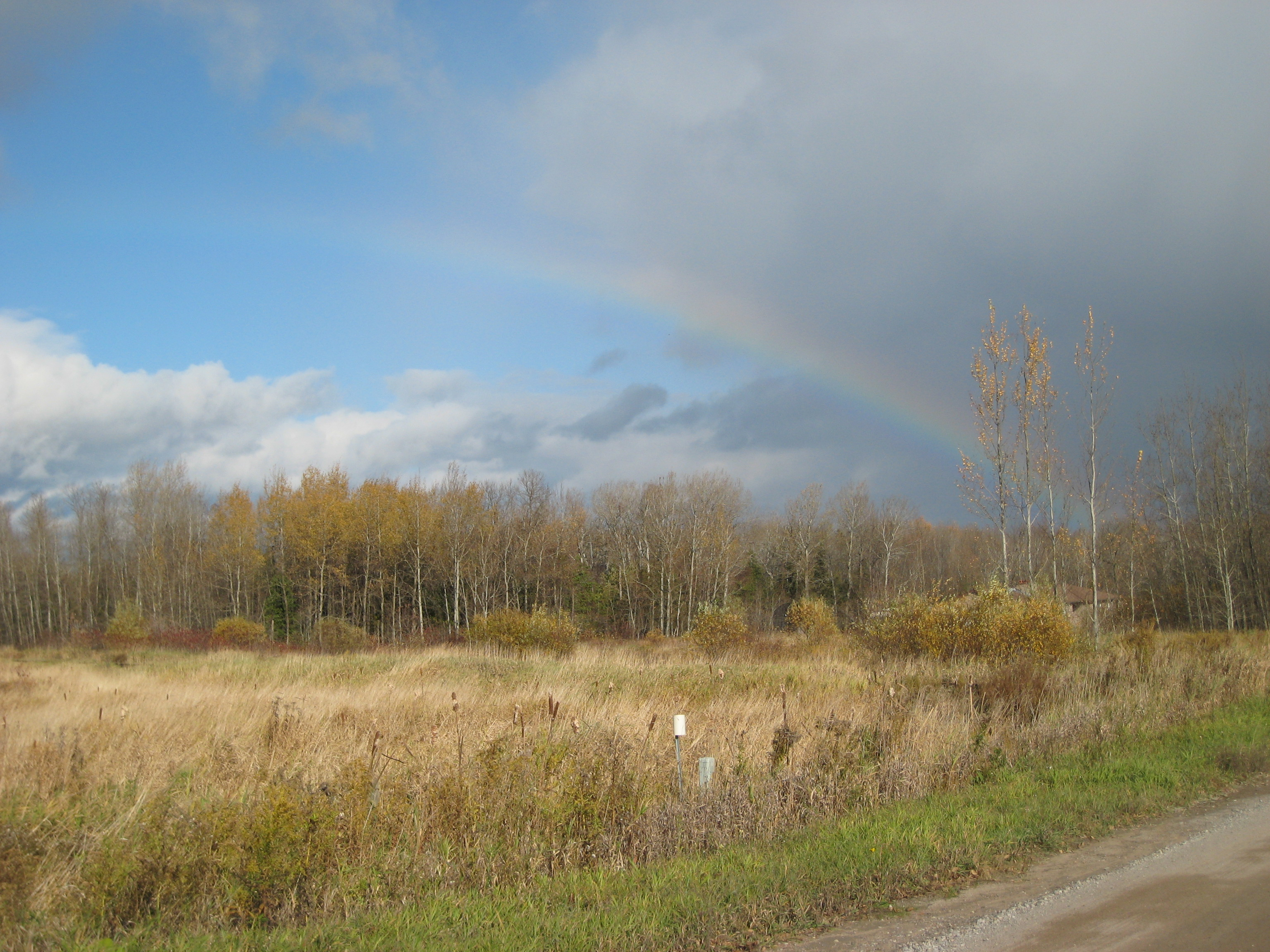
A rainbow over a non-agricultural field on the Holland Marsh.

=== Early swamp commerce ===
Before its development, the entire area was a large wetland extending almost continuously along the western arm of the Holland River. It was part of the Toronto Carrying-Place Trail, although another route to the east was also used, avoiding the dense marshy area. In the 1880s a mattress-stuffing business flourished as reeds were harvested first by hand with scythes then by horse-drawn mowers. Horses were ferried by flat-bottomed scows across flooded areas, wearing large boards on their hooves so as not to sink into the soggy ground.

=== 20th Century ===
In October 1954, Hurricane Hazel overwhelmed the polder's drainage system with unprecedented heavy rains, resulting in the dykes being breached at the north canal. Within six hours the whole area was flooded. The canals were designed with the bank on the outside of the marsh several inches lower than the bank on the inside, so that flooding will occur outside of the marsh first, but the amount of runoff flowing into the valley from the surrounding uplands was so great that this failsafe became ineffective. The pipes below the marsh, which opened into the canal system with one-way valves to prevent flooding, also became ineffective. Highway 400 was five feet underwater. The residents were alerted to the flood because it happened in the evening when they had returned from their fields, and the party phone line rang in all the homes as residents called each other to warn of the flood. Those with houses that had only one floor escaped to neighbours with a second floor, and many had boats or canoes that they used for recreation. Many residents were taken in over the winter by neighbours in the town of Bradford.

On May 31, 1985, a tornado touched down in the Bradford West Gwillimbury portion of the marsh west of Hwy. 400, lifting the roof off of one house on north Canal Road (Simcoe Road #8), and downing power lines and trees and ruining at least one house along Fraser Street. The devastation on Fraser Street was so extensive that it was renamed Tornado Road. The wind of the accompanying storm was of such velocity that many acres of crops were ruined. The storm also resulted in a tornado touching down in Barrie, killing eight and injuring 155 persons, and a tornado touching down in Bolton, destroying at least one house and injuring a teenage girl who was airlifted to hospital and later fully recovered.

=== Reclamation of southernmost polder ===
Professor William Day led the project to reclaim the large southernmost Holland Marsh polder, which was completed in 1930. The canal system was created by engineer Alexander Baird of Sarnia, Ontario.

== Weather ==
During prolonged droughts, the Holland Marsh is prone to dust storms. A chance of dust storms only exists in the spring before the crops have a chance to grow or in the fall after the crops are harvested.
