= The Shift =

The Shift may refer to:

- The Shift (2010 film), a short film by David Trumble
- The Shift (2013 film), a film starring Danny Glover
- The Shift (2023 film), a film starring Kristoffer Polaha
- The Shift (TV series), a 2022 Danish TV medical drama series
- "The Shift" (song), by 10 Years, 2020
- "The Shift", a song by The Beach Boys from their album Surfin' Safari
- The Shift (novel), a 1996 science fiction novel by George Foy that won a Philip K. Dick Award
- The Shift, a 2009 video by Michael A. Goorjian
- The Shift (movement), organization launched by Leilani Farha advocating housing as a human right
- The Shift, an independent online news platform in Malta that investigated Clifton Grima

== See also ==
- Shift (disambiguation)
