= Shift =

Shift may refer to:

== Art, entertainment, and media ==
=== Gaming ===
- Shift (series), a 2008 online video game series by Armor Games
- Need for Speed: Shift, a 2009 racing video game
  - Shift 2: Unleashed, its 2011 sequel

=== Literature ===
- Shift (novel), a 2010 alternative history book by Tim Kring and Dale Peck
- Shift (novella), a 2013 science fiction book, part two of the Silo trilogy by Hugh Howey
- Shift the Ape, a character in The Chronicles of Narnia novel series
- Shift (DC Comics), a DC Comics character who is a fragment of Metamorpho
- Shift (Marvel Comics), a Marvel Comics character who is a clone of Miles Morales

=== Music ===
- Shift (Nasum album), 2004
- Shift (The Living End album), 2016
- Shift (music), a change of level in music
- Shift (string technique), a finger movement from one position to another on the same string

=== Other uses in arts, entertainment, and media ===
- Shift (magazine), a former Canadian technology and culture magazine
- Shift (MSNBC), an online live-streaming video network
- Shift (sculpture), an outdoor sculpture by American artist Richard Serra located in King City, Ontario, Canada

== Business ==
- Shift work, an employment practice
- Shift Technologies (online marketplace), a defunct American online marketplace for used cars
- SHIFT (company), a German company producing the Shiftphone
- SHIFT Inc., a Japanese software testing company

== Linguistics ==
- Language shift, the process in which a community of speakers shift to speaking a different language
- Shifting (syntax), a syntactic process
- Sound shift, also known as sound shifting or sound change
  - Vowel shift

== Mathematics and computing ==
- Barrel shifter, a digital circuit implementing bit shifts
- Bit shift, an operation treating a value as a sequence of binary digits
  - Arithmetic shift
  - Circular shift, often used in cryptography
  - Logical shift
- Shift key, a key on a computer or typewriter keyboard
- Shift operator, a linear operator in mathematics

== Sports ==
- Shift (ice hockey), a group of players in ice hockey
- Infield shift, a defensive alignment in baseball and softball

== Other uses ==
- Shift (clothing), a simple kind of undergarment or dress
- Shift (weapon), an improvised knife used as a weapon
- Gear shift, a lever to change gear in a vehicle
- Paradigm shift, a change in basic assumptions within the ruling theory of science
- Blueshift, any decrease in wavelength, with a corresponding increase in frequency, of an electromagnetic wave
- Redshift, a phenomenon that occurs when light seen coming from an object that is moving away is proportionally increased in wavelength, or shifted, to the red end of the spectrum
- Shapeshifting, a common theme in mythology, folklore, and fairy tales
- Shift vector, in ADM formalism of General Relativity
- Shifting, Hiberno-English slang for making out
- Tax shift, a fiscal policy
- Reality shifting, a cognitive activity in which practitioners fantasize themselves into alternate realities through meditation and focus

== See also ==
- Shifter (disambiguation)
- The Shift (disambiguation)
