= Shifter =

Shifter may refer to:

== Technology ==
- Gear stick, known in US English as "shifter", the lever of a manual or automatic automobile or truck transmission
- Shifter (bicycle part), or gear lever, a bicycle part that selects which gear the chain rests on
- Shifter (tool), an adjustable wrench/spanner
- A switcher locomotive in the terminology of the Pennsylvania Railroad
- Barrel shifter, part of a computer processor that performs bit shifts

== Fiction ==
- A shapeshifting character in science fiction, fantasy fiction, and role-playing games
- Shifter (Justice League Unlimited), a former superhero featured in the animated television series
- Shifter (Dungeons & Dragons), a prestige class in the role-playing game
- Shifter (Eberron), a race in the Eberron campaign setting of the Dungeons & Dragons role-playing game
- Jenny Everywhere, a.k.a. The Shifter, open source webcomic character
- Shiphtur, pseudonym of Danny Le, Canadian League of Legends player

== See also ==
- Shift (disambiguation)
