= King City, Ontario =

King City
- Unincorporated community
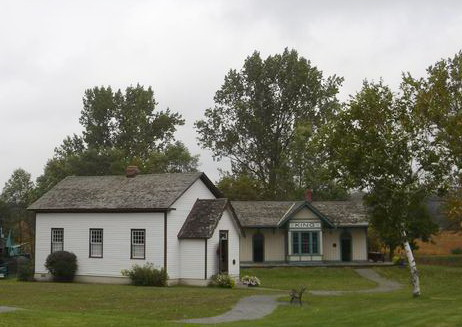
- King Heritage & Cultural Centre

- Location within Canada Location within Ontario Location within North America
- Coordinates: 43°55′43″N 79°31′09″W
- Country: Canada
- Province: Ontario
- Region: York
- Township: King
- Settled: 1836

Government
  - Mayor: Steve Pellegrini
  - Councillors: Jordan Cescolini; Debbie Schaeffer
  - MP: Anna Roberts (Conservative)
  - MPP: Stephen Lecce (Ontario PC)

Area
  - Land: 14.20 km^{2} (5.48 sq mi)

Population (2021)
  - Total: 8,396
  - Density: 591.1/km^{2} (1,531/sq mi)
- Time zone: UTC−5 (EST)
  - Summer (DST): UTC−4 (EDT)
- Forward sortation area: L7B
- Area codes: 905, 289, 365, and 742
- Census Tract: 0460.01
- NTS Map: 30M13 Bolton
- GNBC Code: FBUQL

King City is an unincorporated community in the township of King, Ontario, located 40 kilometres (25 mi) north of Toronto. It is the largest community in King township, with 2,730 dwellings and a population of 8,396 as of the 2021 Canadian census.

== History ==
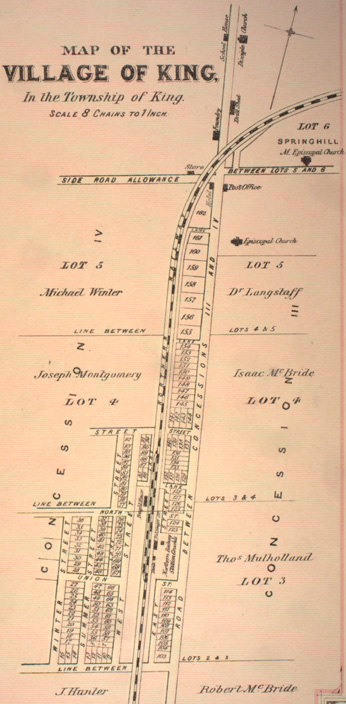
A map of the community published in 1878 in Illustrated historical atlas of the county of York and the township of West Gwillimbury & town of Bradford in the county of Simcoe, Ont.

In 1836, a settlement styled Springhill was established in King. With the arrival of the Ontario, Simcoe and Huron railway in 1853, the settlement began to expand. In 1890, the reeve of King township (James Whiting Crossley) incorporated King City by merging the hamlets of Springhill, Kinghorn, Laskay, and Eversley.

== Geography ==
King City is characterized by rolling hills and clustered temperate forests in the Eastern Great Lakes lowland forests ecoregion. Numerous kettle lakes and ponds dot the area. Creeks and streams from King City, the surrounding area, and as far west as Bolton and as far east as Stouffville are the origin for the East Humber River.

Situated entirely on the southern slope of the central portion of the Oak Ridges Moraine and its watershed, numerous disputes about planning and development have occurred municipally, such as installation of a sewerage system connecting the community to the Durham-York Sewage System in the 2000s.

Numerous stables and other farms have been established on the 147.938 square kilometres (57.119 sq mi) of land area occupied by the township.

== Ecology ==
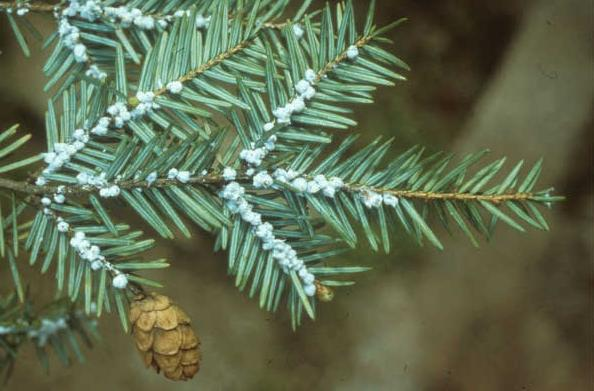
Eastern Hemlock foliage and cone

The provincially significant King-Vaughan Wetland Complex consists of 23 individual wetlands (83% swamp, 17% marsh). It is composed of clay, loam and silt soils on a site that is palustrine (69%) or isolated (31%). Vegetation found on this wetland includes tall shrubs (34%), deciduous trees (28%), dead trees and shrubs (19%), and narrow-leaved emergents (12%); additionally, robust emergents and free-floating plants are found in small agglomerations.

King Forest is a 60-hectare forest with steep valleys containing the narrow flood plain of the East Humber River. The valley walls are of dry-mesic nature, supporting Eastern White Cedar, Eastern Hemlock and Sugar Maple. It is a regenerating forest containing 85 ground-cover species. The flood plain consists primarily of Eastern White Cedar, Sugar Maple and some White Ash, though 26 species do thrive in the area.

The King City Wetland Complex contains eight wetlands (77% swamp, 23% marsh) over 49 hectares. It is a palustrine formation composed 70% of clay, loam or silt soils, and 30% organic soils. It has varied vegetation, including tall shrubs (40%), deciduous trees (37%), robust emergents (14%), narrow-leaved emergents (4%) and submergent vegetation (4%).

Also, the King-Vaughan Forest straddles King City and portions of Vaughan. It is similar to the King Forest, composed of forest areas on steep valley walls containing the flood plain of the Humber River. The dominant species on the valley walls are Sugar Maple and Eastern Hemlock, which are strongly regenerative in the forest. On the flood plain, a greater variety of species may be observed. Immature stands of Manitoba Maple and Eastern White Cedar, poplars and American elm can be found here, as can an extensive Hawthorn scrubland.

== Climate ==
King City has a continental climate moderated by the Great Lakes and influenced by warm, moist air masses from the south, and cold, dry air from the north. The Oak Ridges Moraine affects levels of precipitation: as an air mass arrives from Lake Ontario and reaches the elevated ground surface of the moraine, it rises causing precipitation.

Climate data for King City (1981–2010 normals)
Month	Jan	Feb	Mar	Apr	May	Jun	Jul	Aug	Sep	Oct	Nov	Dec	Year
Record high °C (°F)	13.0 (55.4)	14.0 (57.2)	24.0 (75.2)	30.0 (86.0)	32.2 (90.0)	34.0 (93.2)	35.5 (95.9)	36.0 (96.8)	34.0 (93.2)	27.0 (80.6)	21.0 (69.8)	19.0 (66.2)	36.0 (96.8)
Mean daily maximum °C (°F)	−3.6 (25.5)	−2.2 (28.0)	2.7 (36.9)	10.8 (51.4)	17.7 (63.9)	22.9 (73.2)	25.7 (78.3)	24.5 (76.1)	20.0 (68.0)	12.8 (55.0)	5.6 (42.1)	−0.4 (31.3)	11.4 (52.5)
Daily mean °C (°F)	−7.4 (18.7)	−6.1 (21.0)	−1.5 (29.3)	6.0 (42.8)	12.5 (54.5)	17.7 (63.9)	20.5 (68.9)	19.6 (67.3)	15.3 (59.5)	8.6 (47.5)	2.2 (36.0)	−3.7 (25.3)	7.0 (44.6)
Mean daily minimum °C (°F)	−11.1 (12.0)	−10.0 (14.0)	−5.8 (21.6)	1.1 (34.0)	7.2 (45.0)	12.4 (54.3)	15.2 (59.4)	14.6 (58.3)	10.6 (51.1)	4.4 (39.9)	−1.2 (29.8)	−7.0 (19.4)	2.5 (36.5)
Record low °C (°F)	−34.0 (−29.2)	−31.0 (−23.8)	−24.0 (−11.2)	−15.0 (5.0)	−3.5 (25.7)	2.5 (36.5)	5.0 (41.0)	3.5 (38.3)	−1.5 (29.3)	−7.2 (19.0)	−17.0 (1.4)	−31.0 (−23.8)	−34.0 (−29.2)
Average precipitation mm (inches)	51.7 (2.04)	46.0 (1.81)	51.2 (2.02)	64.9 (2.56)	87.1 (3.43)	84.8 (3.34)	86.4 (3.40)	88.4 (3.48)	84.2 (3.31)	72.9 (2.87)	84.6 (3.33)	55.5 (2.19)	857.6 (33.76)
Average rainfall mm (inches)	20.7 (0.81)	23.1 (0.91)	30.2 (1.19)	59.5 (2.34)	87.1 (3.43)	84.8 (3.34)	86.4 (3.40)	88.4 (3.48)	84.2 (3.31)	71.5 (2.81)	71.0 (2.80)	28.5 (1.12)	735.3 (28.95)
Average snowfall cm (inches)	31.0 (12.2)	22.9 (9.0)	21.0 (8.3)	5.4 (2.1)	0.0 (0.0)	0.0 (0.0)	0.0 (0.0)	0.0 (0.0)	0.0 (0.0)	1.4 (0.6)	13.6 (5.4)	27.0 (10.6)	122.2 (48.1)
Average precipitation days (≥ 0.2 mm)	11.7	8.9	9.9	11.4	11.4	10.6	9.5	10.9	11.3	12.0	12.4	9.7	129.5
Average rainy days (≥ 0.2 mm)	3.3	3.2	5.6	10.0	11.4	10.6	9.5	10.9	11.3	11.8	9.6	4.6	101.8
Average snowy days (≥ 0.2 cm)	8.8	6.2	5.2	1.7	0.0	0.0	0.0	0.0	0.0	0.48	3.7	5.6	31.7
Source: Environment Canada

== Politics ==
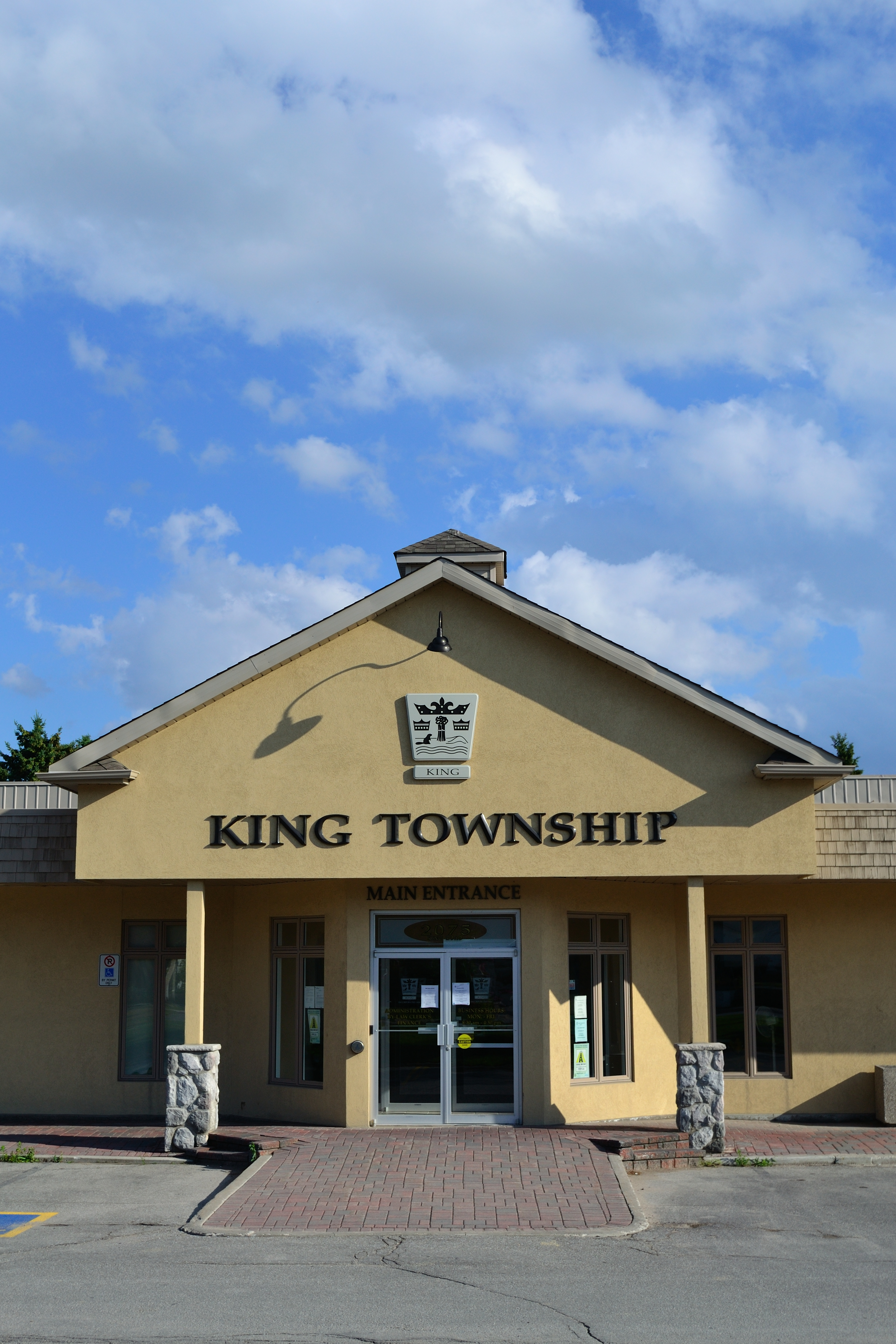
The King Township municipal offices are located in King City.

King City does not have its own municipal government; it is represented municipally on King Township council by two councillors, in Wards 1 and 5. Ward 1 covers King City east of Keele Street, and includes the communities of Eversley, Snowball and Temperanceville. Ward 5 includes the western part of King City to Highway 400.

=== Sewage system ===
King City was historically served by septic systems. In 2001, York Region took away control of planning for King Township's sewage collection system. The Township's council at the time opposed the installation of a sewage system in King City, and brought the issue to court. Changes to the Regional Municipalities Act in 2001 resulted in regional control of sewer and water systems by regional government. The municipal government has authority to plan and manage the local collection system. The 2003 municipal elections resulted in a council favourable to installation of a sewage system in the town and its connection to the York-Durham Sewage System. The Township subsequently applied for project provincial and federal construction grants.

Proponents of the link cited health concerns about the septic systems in the community, and the occasional spill, as reasons to link to the Durham-York system. Opponents stated that the health issues of the septic systems were embellished, and that the link would result in poorly controlled growth in the community, and hence urban sprawl.

The King City Sanitary Servicing Project began construction in early 2005, jointly funded by King Township and York Region. A by-law was passed in April 2005 that made it mandatory for residents to connect to the new sewer system. Installation of the near $50 million project was funded through tax receipts, which included system linkage for public facilities such as municipal offices and the library. This cost included only the provision of a sewerage connection at the property line. In addition, homeowners are required to install piping from the home to the sewerage connection at their expense. Decommissioning and infilling septic tanks is also mandatory.

Installation of the wastewater system was followed by numerous applications for development of residential subdivisions. By 2012, there were at least eight subdivision developments under construction and two expansions within King City, which are expected to add 690 detached houses, 299 townhouses, and a 134-unit four-storey condominium complex, as well as expanding the York Region Seniors Housing centre by 40 units.

=== Traffic ===
Through traffic on King Road has become a concern in the past decade, as the number of heavy vehicles has increased significantly. Notably, dump trucks serving new subdivision construction sites in nearby Oak Ridges use King Road to reach Highway 400. Delivery trucks destined for Aurora and Richmond Hill also make use of King Road as a bypass.

The Township borders on Peel Region, which has promoted the extension of Highway 427 from its current terminus at Highway 7 north to the Bradford Bypass. This extension would border the Township, raising concerns about noise pollution in the rural area.

== Lifestyle and culture ==
=== Culture ===
King City has been a filming location for at least ten movies/TV shows:

- The CBC TV show, The Forest Rangers, had some scenes filmed on Mary Lake near the shrine.
- The 1972 film, Mahoney's Estate, used the downtown section of King City in a major scene
- The 1972 Canadian TV show, Almost Home, used the downtown as well.
- The 1976 movie, Death Weekend, was filmed mainly at Eaton Hall.
- The Gate (1987) was filmed and set at a house located in King Heights subdivision
- To Die For (1995) had a number of scenes filmed at King City Secondary School.
- Golden Will: The Silken Laumann Story (1996, TV) was entirely filmed in King City.
- Walt Disney's Confessions of a Teenage Drama Queen (2004) also had some scenes filmed during a three-day period in July 2003 at King City Secondary School.
- A History of Violence (2005) had its final scene filmed at the historic Eaton Hall in King City, and a baseball scene filmed in Pottageville.
- Billy Madison (1995) had some scenes filmed at the gates to Mary Lake Shrine just north of King City.

King City is also the location of Shift an outdoor sculpture by Richard Serra built between 1970 and 1972. The sculpture was commissioned by Roger Davidson, and is being considered for protection under the Ontario Heritage Act by the Township of King Heritage Committee. The work is located on land just south of the village, for which the township has received development proposals by its owner Great Gulf Group.

=== Education ===
The Seneca College King Campus is located in King City; it is the only post-secondary education facility in King Township, and one of its major employers.

Like the rest of Ontario, King City has access to two public education systems: the regional boards are the York Catholic District School Board and the York Region District School Board.

King City Secondary School is a public school that serves students from all King Township. With a student body of approximately 1100, course offerings are moderate but varied. The school features a full-size 400m outdoor track and a soccer pitch.

Within the public school system, King City Public School serves the community. Holy Name Catholic School offers education within the Catholic separate school system.

Additionally, the community is served by a number of private institutions:

- King City Montessori School, which serves pre-school and kindergarten age groups
- The Country Day School, has kindergarten to Grade 12.
- St. Thomas of Villanova College at Mary Lake Shrine.

=== Religion ===
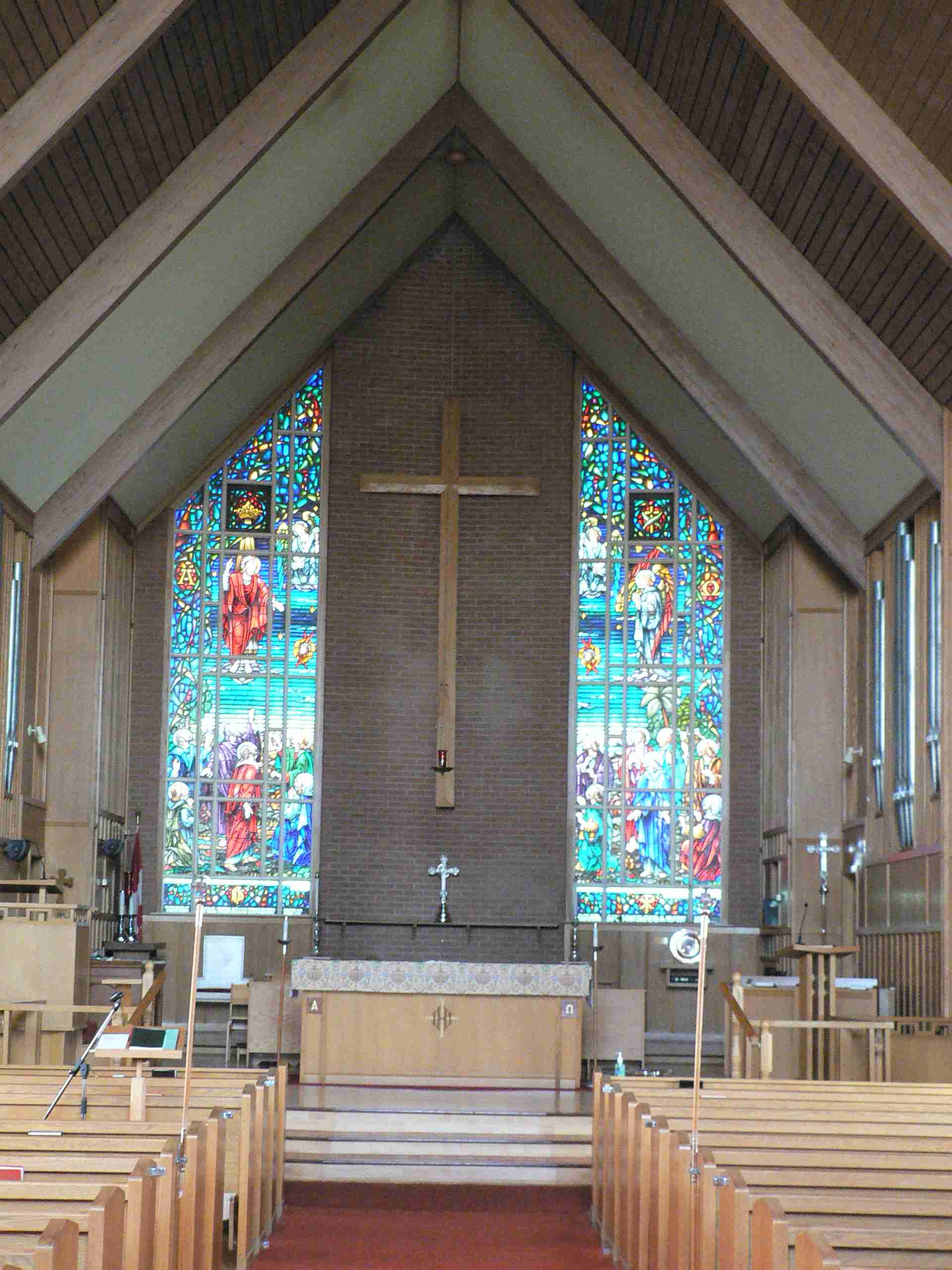
All Saints Church was established in King City in 1857.

Traditionally, King City has been a Protestant community, but Roman Catholicism has a nearly equal number of followers (statistics for the whole Township of King are used). Protestants make up 41% of the population, whereas Roman Catholics represent 39% of residents. Both of these religions outnumber the remaining faiths in practice within King City, namely those who identify themselves as Christian Orthodox (1%), Muslim (0.5%), Jewish (0.5%), Hindu (0.5%), or Sikh (0.5%). Approximately 17% of the population has no religious affiliation.

King City is home to five churches and a shrine:

- Sacred Heart Church is a Roman Catholic institution.
- King City United Church is affiliated with the United Church of Canada, which is the largest Protestant-denominated church in Canada.
- St. Andrews Presbyterian Church operates within the Presbyterian Church of Canada, another Protestant-denominated church.
- All Saints, King City is an Anglican church affiliated with the Anglican Church of Canada, the third major Protestant-denominated religious branch in Canada.
- King Bible Church is affiliated with the Associated Gospel Churches of Canada.
- The Shrine of Our Lady of Grace is a Marian shrine at Mary Lake, an Augustinian Monastery located on the northern edge of King City; it is also referred to as Mary Lake Shrine.

=== Recreation ===
The King City Community Centre and King City Arena host numerous activities, such as youth hockey league matches and yoga classes. They also host many community events throughout the year, and some public King Township meetings.

Leagues for girls and boys hockey, tennis, soccer, and baseball exist, and a number of clubs provide other avenues for kids to enjoy and learn.

King City Memorial Park, next to the arena, has two baseball fields, several soccer fields, two children's playgrounds, and four tennis courts (two with lighting). An open, covered area is used for public events and picnics.

A portion of the extensive Oak Ridges Trail passes through King City. The community is creating its own trail network, the King City Trail; the two networks are currently not connected.

Private recreation facilities include St. Edmunds Sparkling Cricket Club cricket facility operated by the Maple Leaf Cricket Club, and two golf clubs: King's Riding Golf Club and King Valley Golf Club.

Residents are within a ten-minute commute to recreation in other communities. The Maple Community Centre, operated by the City of Vaughan, offers services and memberships to non-Vaughan residents. Services available include a fitness centre, a pool for lap and family swimming, and a public library. Aurora and Richmond Hill also have facilities, both private and public, easily accessible to King City residents.

=== Organizations and clubs ===
- King City Business and Community Association: Founded in December 2011, the King City Business and Community Association is an organization of citizens and business owners living and operating in King City. Throughout the year, the KCBCA hosts and participates in a variety of community initiatives and events. For example, the Annual Christmas in King City, and the Summer Street Festival. The KCBCA also strives to improve the community aesthetic, hoping to make King City a more beautiful place for everyone to work in, shop, and enjoy.
- King Township Public Library King City Branch offers reading programs for kids, maintains a 3-month community papers archive, and is home to the Township of King Archive Collections.
- King Township Historical Society seeks to archive and preserve information about the township's past and culture.
- King City Preserve the Village is an organization that was founded to fight the Big Pipe link to the Durham-York Sewer System, and urban sprawl in King Township.
- The Maple Leaf Cricket Club was established in 1954, and operates on turf wickets facilities. The Club has five cricket grounds which operate on turf wickets. The northwest ground has become the second ground in Canada to be approved to host One Day Internationals (ODI's) by the International Cricket Council in the year 2006. It has become Cricket Canada's main facility for International matches. The club aspires to be the future home of the Canadian Cricket Academy.
- Hospice King-Aurora (previously Hospice King) is a non-profit charity which provides non-medical palliative care for individuals (and their families) with a life-threatening illness. Other services include bereavement support programs, and other counselling with a registered social worker. It was established in 1983, and is a member of the Hospice Palliative Care Ontario.
- Hike Ontario is headquartered in King City. Its mission is to promote hiking and walking in Ontario.
- The Nobleton and King City Horticultural Society meets every fourth Monday in Nobleton. It is a member of the Ontario Horticultural Association, participating in various projects such as Communities in Bloom. In 2004, King Township was the provincial winner in the 10000-20000 category; it will compete in the National event in 2005.
- Dufferin Marsh Restoration Project

== Attractions ==
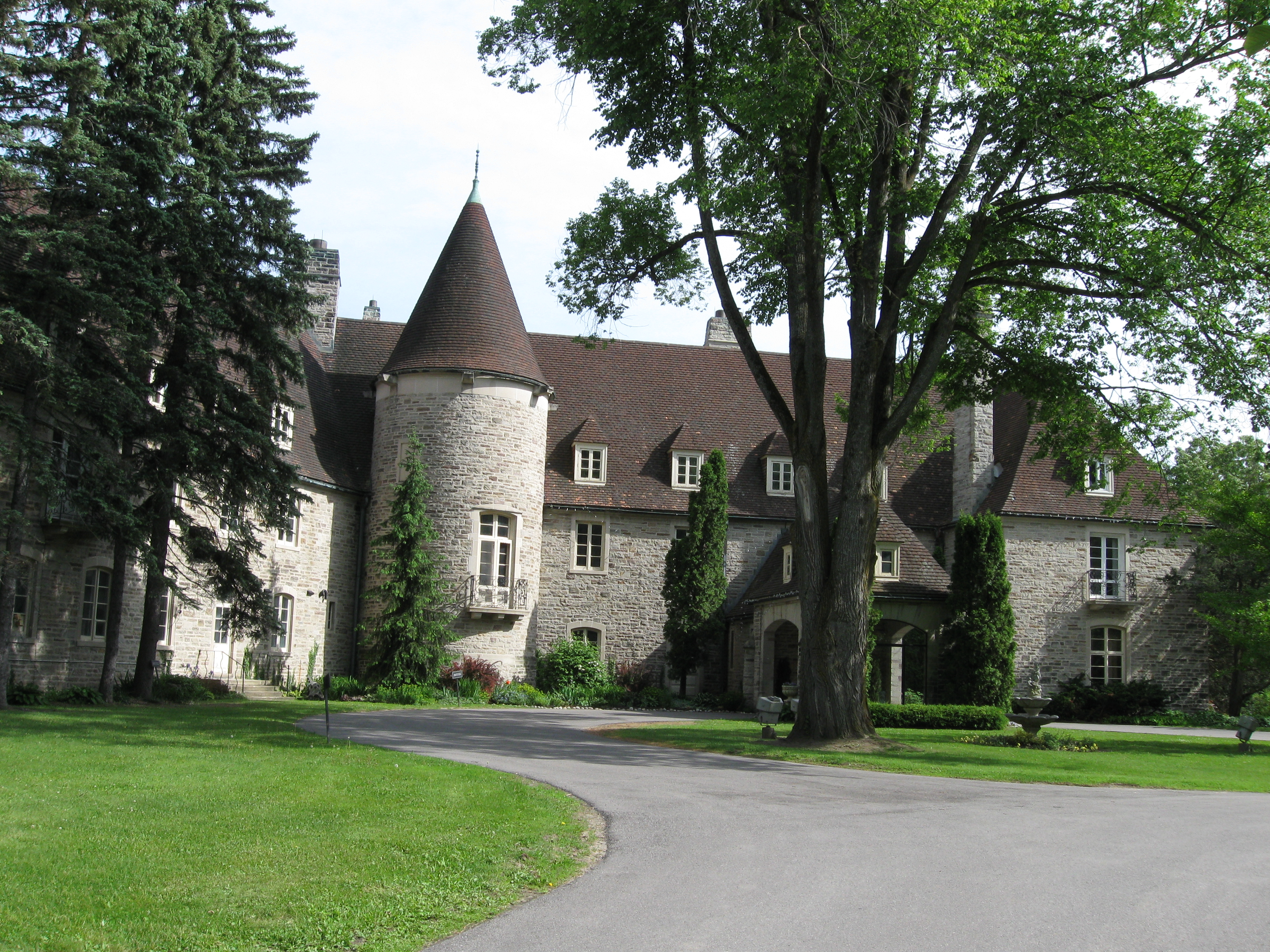
Eaton Hall was originally built for Flora Eaton, the widow of Sir John Craig Eaton

- Eaton Hall, located on the King Campus of Seneca College
- Kingbridge Centre, a conference venue
- King Heritage & Cultural Centre, formerly the King Township Museum
- Marylake Augustinian Monastery
- Skateboard Park, open to the public at the King City Community Centre and Arena

== Economy and business ==
As a small town, King City doesn't have an infrastructure sufficient to support a diversified business community. The primary business sectors are construction, which employs 34% of the workforce, and education, which employs 16% of the workforce (see Education).

Retail establishments are small, family-run businesses, with the exception of financial and realty services. Almost all retailers are located on King Road between Keele Street and Dufferin Street, or on Keele Street south of King Road to Station Road. In the 1980s there was a proposal to build a 3,700 square metres (40,000 sq ft) mall at the northwest corner of King Road and Dufferin Street for 10 to 15 stores and commercial office space. It was never built, but in 2014 construction began on that space for a mall. The project was approved by municipal council in March 2013, and will consist of 16 buildings totalling 151,056 square feet (14,033.6 m^{2}) that will include a Coppa's Fresh Market supermarket, a gas station and drive-through convenience restaurant, and two banks.

== Transport ==
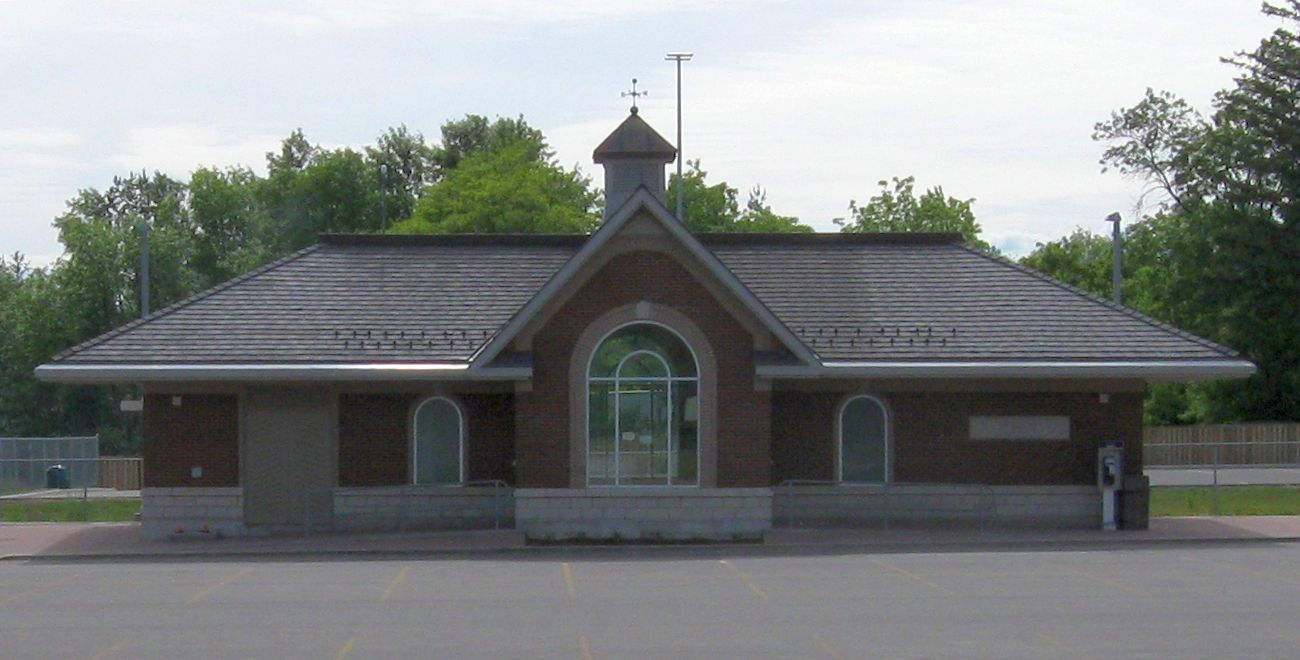
The station building of the King City GO Station.

=== Ground Transport ===
King City has daily GO train service on the Barrie line. Commuters from King Township and parts of the City of Vaughan board the train at King City GO Station, at the south end of the community. GO Transit also provides weekday bus service from King City GO Station, with destinations as far south as Toronto, and as far north as Barrie.

Bus service in King City is also provided by York Region Transit (YRT). Routes 32, 88 and 90 make stops at Seneca College's King Campus. Also in 2005, YRT introduced the 22 King City route which travels from Seneca College across Bloomington Rd. to Yonge St. and over to King City via. King Rd and Bond Cr. where it then travels down Keele Street to the Maple GO Station in Vaughan, Ontario.

Highway 400 runs past King City along its western end; it is a major vehicular artery linking King City to numerous communities in the vicinity, and is part of the extensive 400-series provincial highways. King City is at Exit Number 43, King Road.

=== Air Transport ===
The closest major airport to King City is Toronto Pearson International Airport. The community was once served by the King City Airport, mainly for general aviation and recreational use. However, the airport closed in 1986. Today the only registered aerodrome in the city is a private helipad located at the Kingbridge Centre.

== Communications and media ==
Given its proximity to Toronto, King City has exposure to a broad variety of media. National and Toronto-area daily newspapers offer delivery to the community. Several local papers are delivered to the community, by carrier or post. These include:

- The King Weekly Sentinel, published weekly by Simcoe York Printing & Publishing Ltd. from Beeton. The King Weekly and Sentinel papers merged in 2012. It is delivered by postal mail.
- The ERA Banner, with Sunday, Tuesday and Thursday editions delivered by carrier every week, is published by Metroland Printing, Publishing & Distributing Ltd. through the York Region Newspaper Group.

Over the air television sources from Toronto, Barrie and as far away as Buffalo are generally clear. Affiliates for Canadian networks CBC, CTV and Global, as well as American networks ABC, CBS, Fox and NBC are all available, as are public-support stations TVOntario and PBS.

Cable TV is available from Rogers Cable.

Broadband internet access is available from Rogers via cable, and Bell Canada via digital subscriber line or fiber to the node. Many third parties resell Bell's services in the community. Fixed wireless connections are also available.

Postal service is provided by Canada Post; King City's Forward Sortation Area is L7B. UPS and FedEx both provide weekday service to King City.

== Government research ==
In 1985, the Research Directorate of the Atmospheric Environment Service established the first Canadian Doppler weather radar in King City. In 2004, a Dual-Polarization Radar was installed for further research. These systems are used for predictive purposes, and the data collected is used for weather forecasts for the Greater Toronto Area and the Golden Horseshoe. The observatory also participates in the NEODyS system, which tracks Near-Earth objects. Six asteroids have been discovered at this site.

== Notable residents ==
Rosannagh MacLennan won a gold medal in the 2012 women's trampoline at the London Olympics. and a gold medal in the 2016 women's trampoline at the Rio Olympics.

King City is the hometown of ice hockey players Jeff O'Neill, Curtis Joseph, Wendel Clark, Daniel Carcillo, Alex Pietrangelo, Rick Hampton, Davis Payne and Mario Ferraro.

Rasmus Lerdorf, inventor of the PHP programming language lived in King City during his childhood.

It is also home to musician Jon Brooks, and Jordan Ullman from the R&B duo Majid Jordan had resided in the town, released a song about King City.
