= Danny Glover filmography =

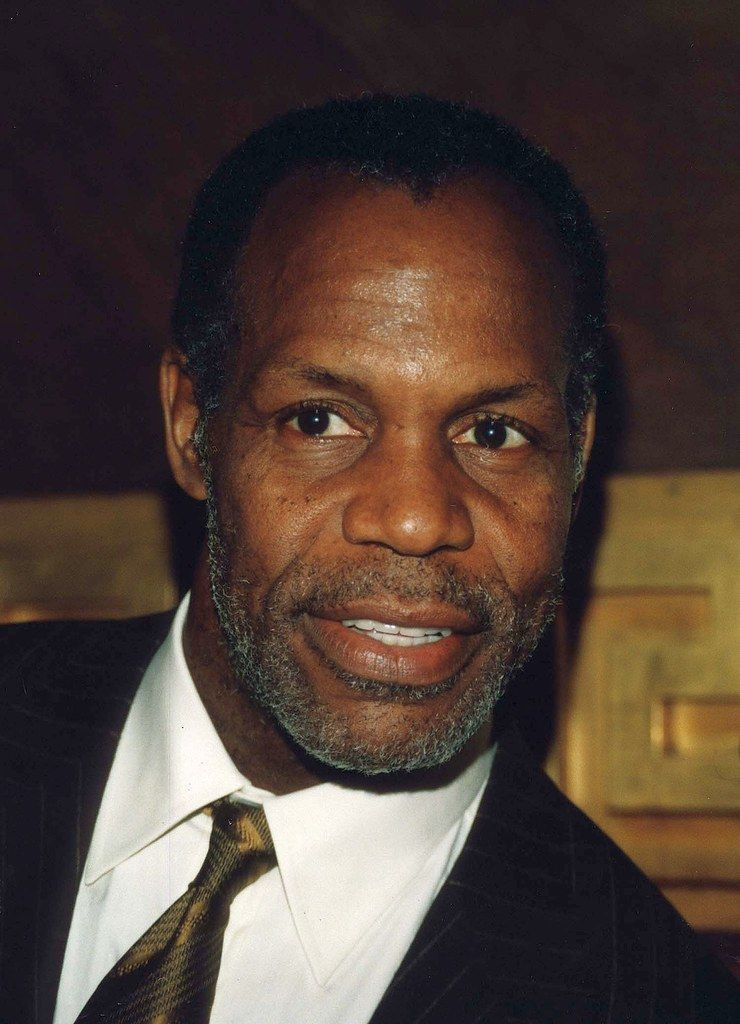
Glover in the 1990s

The following are the performance credits of the American actor Danny Glover.

== Film ==
Year	Title	Role	Notes
1979	Escape from Alcatraz	Inmate	
1981	Chu Chu and the Philly Flash	Morgan	
1982	Out	Jojo / Roland	Alternative title: Deadly Drifter
1984	Iceman	Loomis	
1984	Places in the Heart	Moses "Moze" Hadner	
1985	Witness	Lieutenant James McFee	
1985	Silverado	Malachi "Mal" Johnson	
1985	The Color Purple	Mister Albert Johnson	
1987	Lethal Weapon	Sergeant Roger Murtaugh	
1988	Bat*21	Captain Bartholomew Clark	
1989	Lethal Weapon 2	Sergeant Roger Murtaugh	
1990	To Sleep with Anger	Harry	Independent Spirit Award for Best Male Lead
1990	Predator 2	Lieutenant Michael "Mike" Harrigan	
1991	Flight of the Intruder	Commander Frank "Dooke" Camparelli	
1991	A Rage in Harlem	"Easy Money"	
1991	Grand Canyon	Simon	
1991	Pure Luck	Raymond Campanella	
1992	Lethal Weapon 3	Sergeant Roger Murtaugh	
1993	The Saint of Fort Washington	Jerry / The Narrator	
1993	Bopha!	Micah Mangena	
1994	Maverick	Bank Robber	Uncredited cameo
1994	Angels in the Outfield	Angels Manager George Knox	
1994	Override		Director, TV short
1995	Operation Dumbo Drop	Captain Sam Cahill	
1997	Wild America	Bigfoot	Uncredited cameo
1997	The Rainmaker	Judge Tyrone Kipler	Uncredited prominent role
1997	Gone Fishin'	Gus Green	
1997	Switchback	Bob Goodall	
1998	Antz	Barbatus (voice)	
1998	The Prince of Egypt	Jethro (voice)	
1998	Lethal Weapon 4	Captain Roger Murtaugh	
1998	Beloved	Paul D. Garner	
1999	Our Friend, Martin	Train Conductor (voice)	
2000	Boesman and Lena	Boesman	
2001	3 A.M.	Charles "Hershey" Riley	
2001	The Royal Tenenbaums	Henry Sherman	
2002	Just a Dream		Director; Nominated—Daytime Emmy Award for Outstanding Directing for a Children/Youth/Family Special
2004	The Cookout	Judge Crowley	
2004	Saw	Detective David Tapp	
2005	Manderlay	Wilhelm	
2005	Missing in America	Jake Neeley	
2006	Bamako	Cow-Boy	
2006	Barnyard	Miles (voice)	
2006	The Shaggy Dog	Ken Hollister	
2006	Saw III	Detective David Tapp	Uncredited; archive footage
2006	Dreamgirls	Marty Madison	
2007	Shooter	Colonel Isaac Johnson	
2007	Poor Boy's Game	George Carvery	Nominated—Genie Award for Best Performance by an Actor in a Supporting Role
2007	Battle for Terra	President Chen (voice)	
2007	Honeydripper	Tyrone Purvis	
2007	Miranda Regresa	John Doe	
2008	Be Kind Rewind	Horace Fletcher	
2008	Gospel Hill	John Malcolm	
2008	Tiny Tears	Himself	
2008	Blindness	Old Man With The Black Eye Patch / The Narrator	
2008	The Garden	Himself	
2008	Saw V	Detective David Tapp	Uncredited; archive footage; photographs
2008	Unstable Fables: Tortoise vs. Hare	Walter Tortoise (voice)	
2009	Night Train	Miles	
2009	Down for Life	Mr. Shannon	
2009	The People Speak	Himself	Documentary
2009	The Harimaya Bridge	Joseph Holder	
2009	2012	President Thomas Wilson	Nominated—NAACP Image Award for Outstanding Supporting Actor in a Motion Picture
2009	At the End of Slavery	The Narrator	
2010	Stride	James "Honeybear" Powell	
2010	Death at a Funeral	Uncle Russell	
2010	Dear Alice	Franzis Namazi	Original title: För kärleken
2010	Legendary	Harry "Red" Newman	
2010	Alpha and Omega	Winston (voice)	
2010	Son of Morning	Gabriel Peters	
2010	Age of the Dragons	Ahab	
2010	Mooz-lum	Dean Francis	
2010	I Want to Be a Soldier	The Principal	
2010	Five Minarets in New York	Marcus	Original title: New York'ta Beş Minare
2011	Heart of Blackness	Vaudreuil	
2011	Donovan's Echo	Donovan Matheson	
2012	Highland Park	Ed	
2012	LUV	Arthur	
2012	Sins Expiation	Father Leonard	
2012	The Savoy King: Chick Webb & the Music That Changed America	Count Basie (voice)	
2013	Space Warriors	Commander Philips	
2013	The Shift	Dr. Floyd	
2013	Chasing Shakespeare	William Ward	
2013	Tula: The Revolt	Shinishi	
2013	Extraction	Colonel	
2013	Alpha and Omega 2: A Howl-iday Adventure	Winston	
2014	Bad Asses	Bernie Pope	
2014	Rage	Detective Peter St. John	
2014	Beyond the Lights	Captain David Nicol	
2014	Supremacy	Sonny Walker	
2014	S.O.S - Sights of Death	Sponge	
2014	Yellowbird	Darius (voice)	English version
2014	Day of the Mummy	Carl	
2014	2047: The Final War	Sponge	Italian film also known as 2047: Sights of Death
2015	Bad Asses on the Bayou	Bernie Pope	
2015	Checkmate	Elohim	
2015	Consumed	Hal Westbrook	
2015	Gridlocked	"Sully"	
2015	Waffle Street	Edward Collins	
2015	About Scout	"Red" Freston	
2015	Diablo	Benjamin Carver	
2015	Andron	Chancellor Gordon	
2016	Dirty Grandpa	"Stinky"	
2016	Complete Unknown	Roger	
2016	Back in the Day	Eddie "Rocks" Travor	
2016	Mr. Pig	Ambrose	Nominated—Ariel Award for Best Actor
2016	93 Days	Dr. Benjamin Ohiaeri	
2016	Almost Christmas	Walter Meyers	
2016	Dark Web	The Boss	
2016	Pushing Dead	Bob	
2016	Monster Trucks	Mr. Weathers	
2017	Vagabonds	Uncle Issa	Short film
2017	Extortion	Constable Haagen	
2017	The Good Catholic	Father Victor	
2017	Donald Trump, The Koch Brothers & Their War on Climate Science	The Narrator	
2017	The Curse of Buckout Road	Dr. Lawrence Powell	
2018	Proud Mary	Benny Spencer	
2018	Sorry to Bother You	Langston	
2018	Come Sunday	Gilbert Pearson	
2018	The Old Man & the Gun	Teddy Green	
2018	Death Race: Beyond Anarchy	Bob "Baltimore Bob"	Direct-to-video
2019	The Last Black Man in San Francisco	Grandpa Allen	
2019	The Dead Don't Die	Hank Thompson	
2019	Strive	Mr. Rose	
2019	Jumanji: The Next Level	Milo Walker	
2020	The Drummer	Mark Walker	
2022	American Dreamer	Private investigator	
2022	Press Play	Cooper	
2025	Predator: Killer of Killers	Lieutenant Mike Harrigan	Cameo; likeness only

== Television ==
Year	Title	Role	Notes
1979	B. J. and the Bear	Matt Thomas, TV Reporter	Episode: "A Coffin with a View"; Uncredited
1979	Lou Grant	Leroy	Episode: "Slammer"
1979	Paris		Episode: "Dear John"
1980	Palmerstown, U.S.A.	Harley	Episode: "The Threat"
1981	Keeping On	Lester	Television movie
1981	The Greatest American Hero	Vice Officer	Episode: "Fire Man"
1981	Hill Street Blues	Jesse John Hudson	4 episodes
1981	Gimme a Break!	Bill	Episode: "A Man in Nell's Room"
1983	The Face of Rage	Gary	Television movie
1983	Chiefs	Marshall Peters	Miniseries
1983	Memorial Day	Willie Monroe	Television movie
1985	And the Children Shall Lead	William	Television movie
1986	Tall Tales & Legends	John Henry	Episode: "John Henry"
1987	A Place at the Table	Mr. Scott	Television movie
1987	Mandela	Nelson Mandela	Television movie Nominated—Primetime Emmy Award for Outstanding Lead Actor - Miniseries or a Movie
1989	A Raisin in the Sun	Walter Lee Younger	Television movie
1989	Lonesome Dove	Joshua Deets	Miniseries; Nominated—Primetime Emmy Award for Outstanding Supporting Actor - Miniseries or a Movie (see also Bose Ikard)
1989	Dead Man Out	Dr. Alex Marsh	Television movie Alternative title: Dead Man Walking
1989	Saturday Night Live	Sergeant Roger Murtaugh	Episode: "Mel Gibson/Living Colour"
1991	Captain Planet and the Planeteers	Professor Apollo (voice)	Episode: "Isle of Solar Energy"
1992	The Talking Eggs	The Narrator	Television movie
1993	Alex Haley's Queen	Alec Haley	Miniseries; NAACP Image Award for Outstanding Actor in a Television Movie, Mini-Series or Dramatic Special
1995	Fallen Angels	Philip Marlowe	Episode: "Red Wind"; Nominated—Primetime Emmy Award for Outstanding Guest Actor - Drama Series
1996	America's Dream	Silas	Television movie (Segment: "Long Black Song")
1997	Buffalo Soldiers	Sergeant Washington Wyatt	Television movie
2000	Freedom Song	Will Walker	Television movie Nominated—Primetime Emmy Award for Outstanding Supporting Actor - Miniseries or a Movie; Nominated—Screen Actors Guild Award for Outstanding Performance by a Male Actor in a Miniseries or Television Movie
2002	The Real Eve	The Narrator	Documentary
2003	Good Fences	Tom Spader	Television movie
2003	Biography	The Narrator	Episode: "James Baldwin: Witness"
2003	The Law and Mr. Lee	Henry Lee	Television movie
2004	Legend of Earthsea	Ogion	Miniseries
2005	The Exonerated	David	Television movie
2005	ER	Charlie Pratt Sr.	4 episodes
2006	Take 3	Colonel Weldon	Television movie
2007–2008	Brothers & Sisters	Isaac Marshall	6 episodes
2009	My Name Is Earl	Thomas Monroe	Episode: "My Name is Alias"
2010	Human Target	Client	Episode: "Pilot"
2011	Psych	Mel Hornsby	Episode: "Dead Man's Curveball"
2011	Leverage	Charlie Lawson	Episode: "The Van Gogh Job"
2012	Touch	Professor Arthur Teller	Co-starring role
2012	Hannah's Law	Ison Dart	Television movie
2013	American Dad!	Krampus (voice)	Episode: "Minstrel Krampus"
2013	Muhammad Ali's Greatest Fight	Thurgood Marshall	Television movie
2016	Criminal Minds	Hank Morgan	Episode: "Derek"
2016	Mozart in the Jungle	The Mayor	Episode: "My Heart Opens to Your Voice"
2017	Tour de Pharmacy	"Slim" Robinson	Television movie
2017	Cold Case Files	The Narrator	Documentary series
2017	The Christmas Train	Max Powers	Television movie
2018	Christmas Break-In	Ray	Television movie
2020	Black-ish	Uncle Norman	Episode: "Our Wedding Dre"
2023	The Naughty Nine	Santa Claus	Television movie

== Video games ==
Year	Title	Role	Notes
1991	Brer Rabbit and the Wonderful Tar Baby	The Narrator (voice)	Credited as Danny Lebern Glover
2023	Crime Boss: Rockay City	Gloves	

== Theatre ==
Year	Title	Role	Venue(s)	Notes	Ref.
1982	"Master Harold"... and the Boys	Willy	Yale Repertory Theatre / Lyceum Theatre	Broadway debut Theatre World Award	
1985	A Lesson from Aloes		Steppenwolf Theatre		
1999	Yohen	James	East West Players		
2003	"Master Harold"... and the Boys	Sam	Royale Theatre		
2017	Yohen	James	East West Players		
