= All Saints, King City =

Church in Toronto, Canada

Coordinates: 43°55′38″N 79°31′38″W

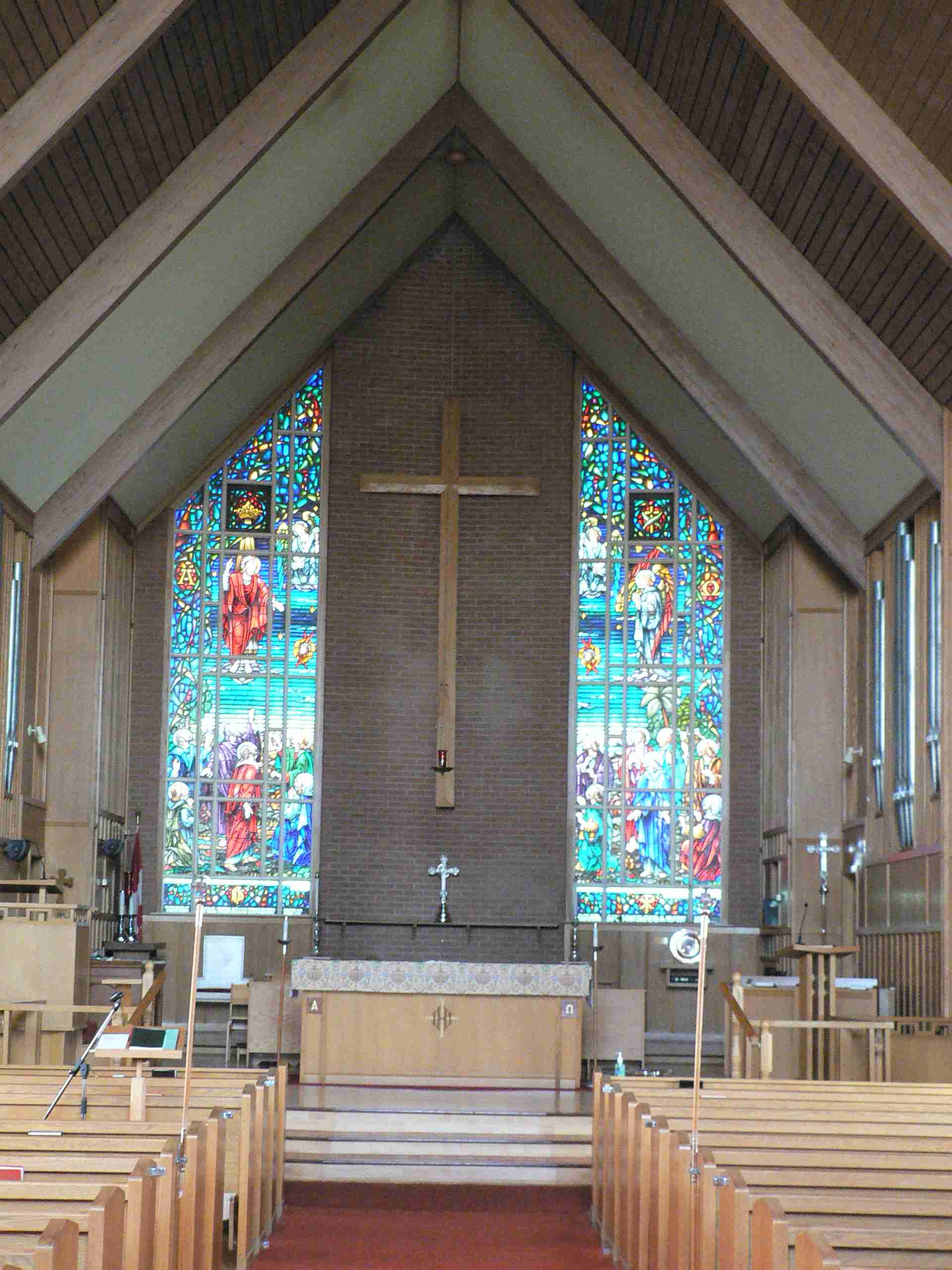
- All Saints, King City
- All Saints, King City
- Denomination: Anglican Church of Canada
- Churchmanship: Broad
- Website: www.allsaintskingcity.com

History
- Founded: 1857; 169 years ago
- Dedication: All Saints

Administration
- Province: Ontario
- Diocese: Toronto
- Deanery: Holland Deanery
- Parish: All Saints, King City

Clergy
- Rector: The Reverend Canon Erin Martin

All Saints, King City is a parish of the Anglican Church of Canada in the Diocese of Toronto, Ecclesiastical Province of Ontario. It was established in 1857 in Springhill, now known as King City. The facility was originally built of pine cleared from the site, and was covered with brick in 1871. In 1960, the building was extended with the addition of the parish hall.
