= Tilted Arc =

Public art installation by Richard Serra in Manhattan, New York, U.S.

Coordinates: 40°42′54.78″N 74°0′13.21″W

Tilted Arc, Richard Serra, 1981

Tilted Arc was a controversial public art installation by Richard Serra, displayed in Foley Federal Plaza in Manhattan from 1981 to 1989. It consisted of a 120-foot-long (37 m), 12-foot-high (3.7 m) solid, unfinished plate of rust-covered COR-TEN steel. Advocates characterized it as an important work by a well-known artist that transformed the space and advanced the concept of sculpture, whereas critics focused on its perceived ugliness and saw it as ruining the site. Following an acrimonious public debate, the sculpture was removed in 1989 as the result of a federal lawsuit and has never been publicly displayed since, in accordance with the artist's wishes.

== Commissioning and design ==
In 1979, the United States General Services Administration's Art-in-Architecture program decided to commission a work of public art to grace the open space in front of a planned addition to the Jacob K. Javits Federal Building in Manhattan, New York City.

Taking the recommendation of a National Endowment for the Arts panel of art experts, the U.S. General Services Administration administrator gave the commission to sculptor Richard Serra, a fine-arts graduate of Yale University who at age 40 was one of the leading minimalist sculptors. The contract for the commission required Serra to give the work to GSA, making it property of the United States.

The post-minimalist artwork was designed and constructed in 1981. Exemplifying Serra's minimalist, conceptual style, Tilted Arc was a solid, unfinished plate of COR-TEN steel, 120 feet (37 m) long, 12 feet (3.7 m) tall, and 2.5 inches (6.4 cm) thick. As its name suggests, it was slightly tilted. The steel rusted over time.

Placed in the Federal Plaza, the work bisected the space, blocking views and paths of those who frequented the plaza. Serra said of the design, "The viewer becomes aware of himself and of his movement through the plaza. As he moves, the sculpture changes. Contraction and expansion of the sculpture result from the viewer's movement. Step by step, the perception not only of the sculpture but of the entire environment changes."

For Serra, an important part of the work's meaning was that it would interact with the commuter passing through the plaza, a location usually passed through quickly on the way to somewhere else. This would subsequently become important as the basis for Serra's designation of the work as site-specific.

== Reactions ==
Commissioned in 1979, Tilted Arc immediately attracted intense negative feedback, prominently from Chief Judge Edward D. Re, as well as fierce defenders. Those who worked in the area found the sculpture extremely disruptive to their daily routines, and within months the work had driven over 1300 government employees in the greater metro area to sign a petition for its removal. Serra, however, wrote, "It is a site-specific work and as such is not to be relocated. To remove the work is to destroy the work."

Serra's side argued that Tilted Arc was designed to be counterintuitive, to "redefine" the space in which it existed, and that due to this intimate relationship between the location and the meaning of the work, it could not exist as a piece of humane art unless it remained in that exact location within the Foley Plaza. Therefore, it was said that by removing the physical steel sculpture, the government would destroy the broader work, regardless of its physical existence.

Opponents countered that, because the sculpture forced the site to function as an extension of the sculpture, it was in effect "holding the site hostage." Calvin Tomkins, an art critic for The New Yorker magazine, was quoted saying, "I think it is perfectly legitimate to question whether public spaces and public funds are the right context for work that appeals to so few people – no matter how far it advances the concept of sculpture." Sociologist Nathan Glazer, writing in The Public Interest, declared that Serra was “attacking the awful by increasing the awfulness. To the misery of working in an ugly and poorly designed building, it was Serra’s thought to add additional misery in the form of a sculpture that was ugly to most people… that obstructed the plaza, that offered no space to sit on, that blocked sun and view, and made the plaza unusable even for those moments of freedom when the weather permitted office workers to eat their lunch outside.” The Storefront for Art and Architecture invited prominent NYC artists and architects to envision the future plaza as a protest in "After Tilted Arc".

A public hearing was held on the subject of the sculpture in March 1985, with 122 people testifying in favor of keeping the piece and 58 in favor of removing it. Notable speakers arguing in favor of the sculpture included Philip Glass, Keith Haring, and Claes Oldenburg. Artists, art historians, and even a psychiatrist testified for the sculpture to remain in its location. Local workers argued for removal, with one person saying: "Every time I pass this so-called sculpture I just can’t believe it ... The General Services Administration, or whoever approved this, this goes beyond the realm of stupidity. This goes into even worse than insanity. I think an insane person would say, ‘How crazy can you be to pay $175,000 for that rusted metal wall?' You would have to be insane— more than insane."

In support of its removal of the sculpture, the government advanced multiple security arguments, claiming that allowing the sculpture to remain in the plaza would "run the risk of deflecting explosions into government buildings opposite and impeded adequate surveillance of the area beyond." A jury of five voted 4–1 to remove the sculpture. In 1986, Serra sued the GSA to enjoin the removal of Tilted Arc, launching the lawsuit considered the most notorious public sculpture controversy in the history of art law.

== Trial ==
Serra's complaint against the United States General Services Office sought to enjoin the office from violating an oral agreement not to remove the sculpture from Federal Plaza. Serra also claimed that the removal of "Tilted Arc" constituted a violation of his First Amendment right to free speech and Fifth Amendment right to due process. The federal district court rejected all three of Serra's claims, and Serra appealed his constitutional claims to the Court of Appeals for the Second Circuit.

On the First Amendment claim, the court of appeals ruled that while "Tilted Arc" was first amendment speech, the government's legal ownership of the sculpture made it government speech subject to the government's discretion. Even if Serra did retain a free speech interest in "Tilted Arc," the government's interest in keeping the plaza unobstructed constituted a permissible, content-neutral time, place, and manner restriction on free speech. The court further determined that Serra did not retain a property interest in the sculpture, since it was indeed signed over to the government upon commission, and therefore did not have a Fifth Amendment due process claim.

== Aftermath ==
Tilted Arc was stored in three sections stacked in a government parking lot in Brooklyn upon removal from the plaza. In 1999, they were moved to a storage space in Maryland. Although the physical component of the work is in storage, it will likely never again be erected since it is Serra's wish that it will never be displayed anywhere other than its original location. Serra has stated that the case exemplifies the U.S. legal system's preference toward capitalistic property rights over democratic freedom of expression.

== Influence ==
The Tilted Arc controversy may have contributed to the enactment, in 1990, of the Visual Artists Rights Act (VARA). An amendment to the Copyright Act of 1976, VARA provides "moral rights" to the artist so that they have rights to attribution and integrity when it comes to paintings, drawings, and sculpture. However, a 2006 decision by the U.S. Court of Appeals established that VARA does not protect location as a component of site-specific work.

William Gaddis satirized these events in his 1994 novel, A Frolic of His Own.

== See also ==
- Joel Wachs, Los Angeles City Council member on the committee who recommended what to do with the art piece.
