= Kingbridge Centre =

Coordinates: 43.914728°N 79.552131°W

The Kingbridge Centre is a conference venue and communications facility in King City, Ontario, Canada. It was designed by Arthur Erickson and built in 1989.

== History ==
Eli Hollinshead purchased a 200-acre (0.81 km^{2}) parcel of land on December 18, 1850. On January 6, 1854, it was sold to John Peterman, who later divided it into 4 parcels, the largest being 120 acres (0.49 km^{2}). Peterman sold the largest parcel, on which the Kingbridge Centre now stands, to William McNair for $6,000 on March 6, 1861.

In 1929, the farm was sold to the Toronto company of the Girl Guides of Canada. After a series of repairs to the existing buildings, the camp was relocated to Hawkestone, Ontario.

The property's main facilities were originally built in 1989 by Murray Koffler, the founder of Shoppers Drug Mart and co-founder of Four Seasons Hotels. The site was first named the King Ranch Health Spa and Fitness Resort, and it was designed as a luxury spa facility. It opened in 1989 and operated until 1992, when it fell into receivership and was repossessed by its financier, The Canadian Imperial Bank of Commerce (CIBC). Without viable economic prospects, CIBC adapted the facility to become its "Leadership Centre".

In 1996, the secretive Bilderberg Group held its annual meeting here.

In 2001, the site was sold to John Abele, co-founder of Boston Scientific, who transformed it into its current use as a conference centre. Upon Abele's retirement in 2021, the facility was entrusted to the Pathak Family Trust and Ekagrata Inc., with Prashant Pathak becoming its chairman.

During the COVID-19 pandemic in Ontario, the facility was used for temporary transitional shelter for individuals to self-isolate, in a partnership with the regional government of York and the Salvation Army.

== Aerodrome ==
The centre has a helipad registered in the Canada Flight Supplement under the identifier CKC3. It can accommodate helicopters up to 43.3 feet (13.2 m) long.
