= David Trumble =

- Born: David William Trumble; 6 March 1986 (age 40); Oxford, England, UK
- Occupations: Director/Producer and Political Cartoonist
- Years active: 2002–present

David Trumble (born 6 March 1986) is a British film writer/director and political cartoonist for The Sun newspaper.

== Early life ==
Trumble attended the Cherwell School in Oxford and won the Dan Hemingway Prize. In 2005 he studied BA Film Production at Arts University Bournemouth, where he graduated as a film director.

== Political cartoonist ==
In 2008, Trumble began working as a political cartoonist for The Sun Newspaper, where he provided the weekly cartoon for Trevor Kavanagh's political column on Mondays. His cartoon topics ranged from Barack Obama's victory over John McCain to the dwindling rule of Gordon Brown and the introduction of the Coalition Government in the United Kingdom. David worked under the name "Trumble", the signature he uses to this day. He left the Sun's employ in early 2011.

== The Shift ==
In 2010, Trumble collaborated with longtime friend Greg Lock to make a short film entitled The Shift. Trumble produced and directed the film, partly based on Lock's own experiences from working in the ambulance service. He also co-wrote the film with Matt Brothers and Lock.
