= Richard Serra =

American sculptor (1938–2024)

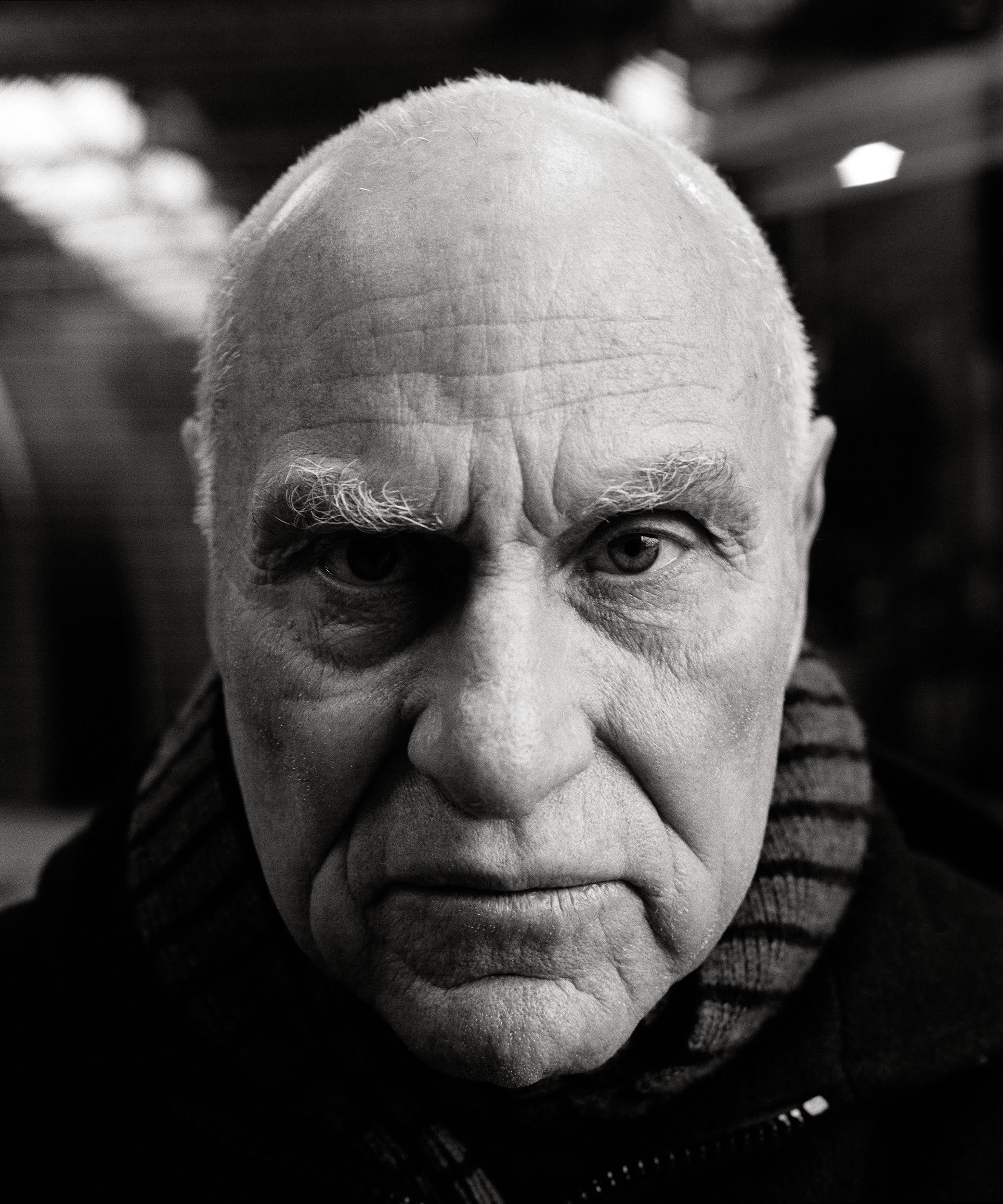
- Serra in 2005
- Born: November 2, 1938; San Francisco, California, U.S.
- Died: March 26, 2024 (aged 85); Orient, New York, U.S.
- Education: University of California, Berkeley (attended); University of California, Santa Barbara (B.A. 1961); Yale University (B.F.A. 1962, M.F.A. 1964)
- Movement: Postminimalism, process art
- Spouses: Nancy Graves (m. 1965; div. 1970) Clara Weyergraf (m. 1981)

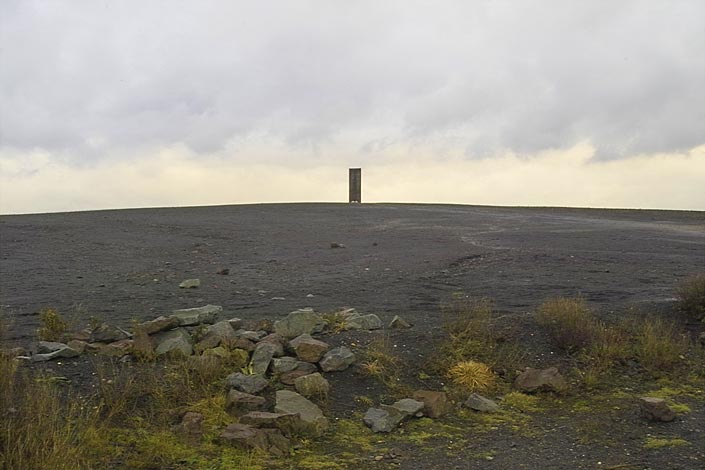
Bramme for the Ruhr-District, 1998 at Essen

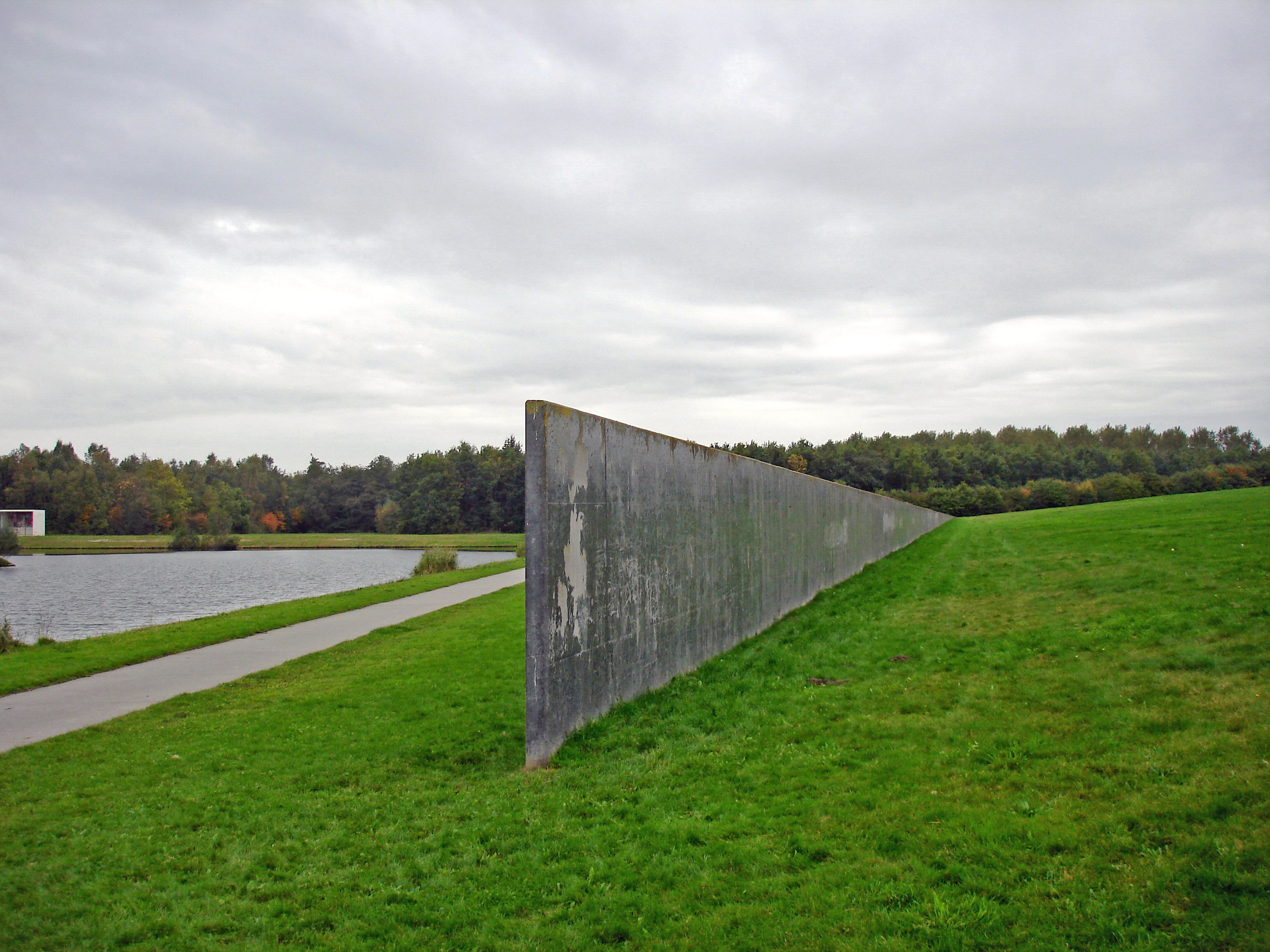
Sea Level (South-west part), Zeewolde, Netherlands

Richard Serra (November 2, 1938 – March 26, 2024) was an American artist known for his large-scale abstract sculptures made for site-specific landscape, urban, and architectural settings, and whose work has been primarily associated with postminimalism. Described as "one of his era's greatest sculptors", Serra became notable for emphasizing the material qualities of his works and exploration of the relationship between the viewer, the work, and the site.

Serra pursued English literature at the University of California, Berkeley, before shifting to visual art. He graduated with a B.A. in English literature from the University of California, Santa Barbara, in 1961, where he met influential muralists Rico Lebrun and Howard Warshaw. Supporting himself by working in steel mills, Serra's early exposure to industrial materials influenced his artistic trajectory. He continued his education at Yale University, earning a B.A. in art history and an M.F.A. degree in 1964. While in Paris on a Yale fellowship in 1964, he befriended composer Philip Glass and explored Constantin Brâncuși's studio, both of which had a strong influence on his work. His time in Europe also catalyzed his subsequent shift from painting to sculpture.

From the mid-1960s onward, particularly after his move to New York City in 1966, Serra worked to radicalize and extend the definition of sculpture beginning with his early experiments with rubber, neon, and lead, to his large-scale steel works. His early works in New York, such as To Lift from 1967 and Thirty-Five Feet of Lead Rolled Up from 1968, reflected his fascination with industrial materials and the physical properties of his chosen mediums. His large-scale works, both in urban and natural landscapes, have reshaped public interactions with art and, at times, were also a source of controversy, such as that caused by his Tilted Arc in Manhattan, New York in 1981. Serra was married to artist Nancy Graves between 1965 and 1970, and Clara Weyergraf between 1981 and his death in 2024.

== Early life and education ==
Serra was born in San Francisco on November 2, 1938, to Tony and Gladys Serra – the second of three sons. His father was Spanish from Mallorca and his mother Gladys (nee Fineberg) was the daughter of Russian Jewish immigrants from Odessa, USSR. From a young age, he was encouraged to draw by his mother and he carried a small notebook for his sketches. His mother would introduce her son as "Richard the artist." His father worked as a pipe fitter for a shipyard near San Francisco.

Serra recounted a memory of a visit to the shipyard to see a boat launch when he was four years old. He watched as the ship transformed from an enormous weight to a buoyant, floating structure and noted, "All the raw material that I needed is contained in the reserve of this memory." Serra's father, who was related to the Catalan architect Antoni Gaudí, later worked as a candy plant foreman.

Richard Serra studied English literature at the University of California, Berkeley in 1957 before transferring to the University of California, Santa Barbara and graduating in 1961 with a BA in English Literature. In Santa Barbara, Serra met the muralists, Rico Lebrun and Howard Warshaw. Both were in the Art Department and took Serra under their wing. During this period, Serra worked in steel mills to earn a living, as he did at various times from ages 16–25.

Serra studied painting at Yale University and graduated with both a BA in art history and an MFA degree in 1964. Fellow Yale alumni contemporaneous to Serra include Chuck Close, Rackstraw Downs, Nancy Graves, Brice Marden, and Robert Mangold. At Yale Serra met visiting artists from the New York School including Philip Guston, Robert Rauschenberg, Ad Reinhardt, and Frank Stella. Serra taught a color theory course during his last year at Yale and after graduating was asked to help proof Josef Albers's notable color theory book Interaction of Color.

In 1964, Serra was awarded a one-year traveling fellowship from Yale and went to Paris where he met the composer Philip Glass who became a collaborator and long-time friend. In Paris, Serra spent time sketching in Constantin Brâncuși's studio, partially reconstructed inside the Musée national d'Art moderne on the Avenue du Président Wilson, allowing Serra to study Brâncuși's work, later drawing his own sculptural conclusions. An exact replica of Brâncuși's studio is now located opposite the Centre Pompidou. Serra spent 1965 in Florence, Italy on a Fulbright Grant. In 1966 while still in Italy, Serra made a trip to the Prado Museum in Madrid, Spain and saw Diego Velázquez's painting Las Meninas. The artist realized he would not surpass the skill of that painting and decided to move away from painting.

While still in Europe, Serra began experimenting with nontraditional sculptural material. He had his first one-person exhibition "Animal Habitats" at Galleria Salita, Rome. Exhibited there were assemblages made with live and stuffed animals which would later be referenced as early work from the Arte Povera movement.

== Work ==
=== Early work ===
Serra returned from Europe moving to New York City in 1966. He continued his constructions using experimental materials including rubber, latex, fiberglass, neon, and lead. His Belt Pieces were made with strips of rubber and hung on the wall using gravity as a forming device. Serra combined neon with continuous strips of rubber in his sculpture Belts (1966–67) referencing the serial abstraction in Jackson Pollock's Mural (1963.) Around that time Serra wrote Verb List (1967) a list of transitive verbs (i.e. cast, roll, tear, prop, etc.) which he used as directives for his sculptures. To Lift (1967), and Thirty-Five Feet of Lead Rolled Up (1968), Splash Piece (1968), and Casting (1969), were some of the action-based works with origins in the verb list. Serra used lead in many of his constructs because of its adaptability. Lead is malleable enough to be rolled, folded, ripped, and melted. With To Lift (1967) Serra lifted a 10-foot (3 m) sheet of rubber off the ground making a free-standing form; with Thirty-five Feet of Lead Rolled Up (1968), Serra, with the help of Philip Glass, unrolled and rolled a sheet of lead as tightly as they could.

In 1968 Serra was included in the group exhibition "Nine at Castelli" at Castelli Warehouse in New York where he showed Prop (1968), Scatter Piece (1968), and made Splashing (1968) by throwing molten lead against the angle of the floor and wall. In 1969 his piece Casting was included in the exhibition Anti-Illusion: Procedures/Materials at the Whitney Museum of American Art in . In Casting the artist again threw molten lead against the angle of the floor and wall. He then pulled the casting made from the hardened lead away from the wall and repeated the action of splashing and casting creating a series of free-standing forms.

"To prop" is another transitive verb from Serra's "Verb List" utilized by the artist for a series of assemblages of lead plates and poles dependent on leaning and gravity as a force to stay upright. His early Prop Pieces like Prop (1968) relied mainly on the wall as a support. Serra wanted to move away from the wall to remove what he thought was a pictorial convention. In 1969 he propped four lead plates up on the floor like a house of cards. The sculpture One Ton Prop: House of Cards (1969) weighed 1 ton and the four plates were self-supporting.

Another pivotal moment for Serra occurred in 1969 when he was commissioned by the artist Jasper Johns to make a Splash Piece in Johns's studio. While Serra heated the lead plates to splash against the wall, he took one of the larger plates and set it in the corner where it stood on its own. Serra's break into space followed shortly after with the sculpture Strike: To Roberta and Rudy (1969–71). Serra wedged an 8 by 24-foot (2.4 × 7.3 m) plate of steel into a corner and divided the room into two equal spaces. The work invited the viewer to walk around the sculpture, shifting the viewer's perception of the room as they walked.

Serra first recognized the potential of working in large scale with his Skullcracker Series made during the exhibition, "Art and Technology," at LACMA (the Los Angeles County Museum of Art) in 1969. He spent ten weeks building a number of ephemeral stacked steel pieces at the Kaiser Steelyard. Using a crane to explore the principles of counterbalance and gravity, the stacks were as tall as 30 to 40 feet (9 to 12 m) high and weighed between 60 and 70 tons (54.4 and 63.5 t). They were knocked down by the steelworkers at the end of each day. The scale of the stacks allowed Serra to begin to think of his work outside the confines of gallery and museum spaces.

=== Landscape works ===
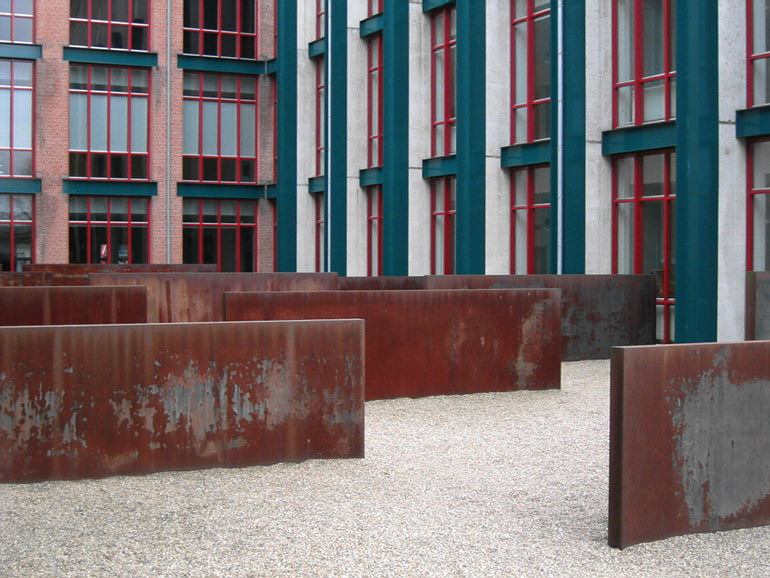
Hours of the Day (1990), Bonnefanten Museum, Maastricht

In 1970 Serra received a Guggenheim Fellowship and traveled to Japan. His first outdoor sculptures, To Encircle Base Plate (Hexagram) (1970) and Sugi Tree (1970), were both installed in Ueno Park in Tokyo as part of the Tokyo Biennale.

While in Japan, Serra spent most of his time studying the Zen gardens and temples of the Myoshin-ji in Kyoto. The layout of the gardens revealed the landscape as a total field that can only be experienced by walking. The gardens changed Serra's way of seeing space in relation to time. Upon returning to the United States he built his first site-specific outdoor work: To Encircle Base Plate Hexagram, Right Angles Inverted (1970). Here Serra embedded two semi-circular steel flanges, forming a ring 26 feet (7.9 m) in diameter, into the surface of 183rd Street in the Bronx. One semi-circle measured 1 inch (25.4 mm) wide and the second, 8 inches wide (203.2 mm). The work was visible from two perspectives: either when the viewer came directly upon it or from above on a stairway overlooking the street.

Throughout the 1970s Serra continued to make outdoor site-specific sculptures for urban areas and landscapes. Serra was interested in the topology of landscape and how one relates to it through movement, space, and time. His first landscape work was made in late 1970 when Serra was commissioned by the art patrons Joseph and Emily Rauh Pulitzer to build a sculpture on their property outside St. Louis, Missouri. Pulitzer Piece: Stepped Elevation (1970–71) was Serra's first large-scale landscape work. Three plates measuring 5 feet (1.5 m) high by 40 to 50 feet (12 to 15 m) long were placed across approximately 3 acres (12 140 m^{2}). The placement of the plates was determined by the fall of the landscape. Each plate was impaled into the ground far enough until its rise was 5 feet (1.5 m). Serra's intention was for the plates to act as cuts in the landscape that function as surrogate horizons as viewers walked amongst them.

Shift (1970–1972), Serra's second endeavor in the landscape, was built in a field owned by the collector Roger Davidson in King City, Ontario. The sculpture is composed of six rectilinear concrete sections placed along the sloping landscape. In 2013 Shift was designated a Heritage Site under the Ontario Heritage Act. Shift, like Pulitzer Prizes pieces, was based on the elevational fall of the land over a given distance. The top edges of the plates function as a horizon being placed into specific elevational intervals as you walk the entire field.

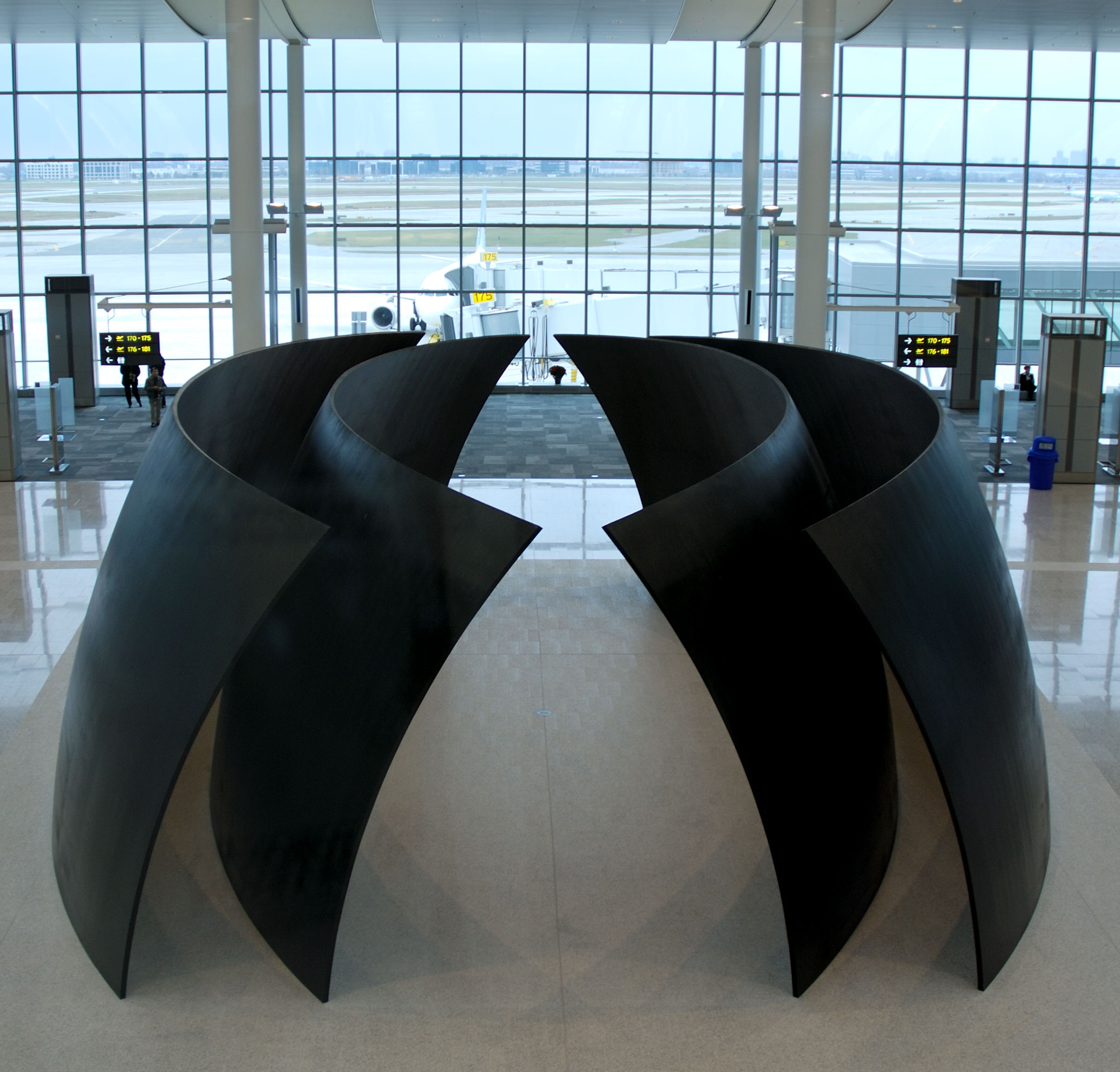
Richard Serra's Tilted Spheres in Toronto Pearson International Airport (Terminal 1, Pier F)

Serra's subsequent site-specific works in landscape continued to explore the topography of the land and how the sculpture relates to this topography by way of movement, meditation, and perception of the viewer. Among the most notable of the landscape works are Porten i Slugten (1983–1986) at the Louisiana Museum of Modern Art, Denmark; Carnegie (1985) outside the Carnegie Museum of Art, Pittsburgh; Afangar (Stations, Stops on the Road, To Stop and Look: Forward and Back, To Take It All In) (1990) on Videy Island, Iceland; Schunnemunk Fork (1991) in Storm King Art Center, New York; Snake Eyes and Box Cars (1993) in Sonoma County, California; Te Tuhirangi Contour (2000–2002) in Kaipara, New Zealand; and East-West/West-East (2014) in Qatar.

The sculpture Porten i Slugten (1983–1986) was commissioned for the Louisiana Museum of Modern Art in Humlebaek, Denmark. After walking the museum grounds, Serra chose a ravine that runs towards the Kattegat Sea as the site for his sculpture. The ravine was the only area on the grounds that had not been landscaped. Two plates were set at an angle to each other at the end of a sloping stretch of path which fronts the ravine. The plates function in their location like a gate that opens as the viewer walks down the path toward the sea. Seen from the center of a bridge, which crosses the ravine and leads to the museum, the two plates form a single plane as if the gate had closed. As you walk down from the museum to the ocean below, the plates appear to have a continuous swinging motion. In 1988 Serra was invited by the National Gallery of Iceland to build a work. Serra chose Videy Island as the site for Afangar (Stations, Stops on the Road, To Stop and Look: Forward and Back, To Take It All In) (1990). The sculpture consists of nine pairs of basalt columns (a material indigenous to Iceland) and is placed along the periphery of Vesturey in the western part of the country. All nine locations share the same elevations in that the stones of each pair are situated at an elevation of 9 and 10 meters, respectively. Each set of stones is level at the top. All stones at the higher elevation measure 3 meters; all stones at the lower elevation measure 4 meters. Because of the variance of topography, the stones in a set are sometimes closer together, sometimes further apart. The rise and fall of Videy Island and the surrounding landscape are seen against the fixed measure of the standing stones. The stones are visible along the horizon of the island and orient the viewer against the rise and fall of the surrounding landscape.

Te Tuhirangi Contour (2000–2002) is located on a vast open pasture on Gibbs Farm in Kaipara, New Zealand. The sculpture stands 20 feet (6 m) high and spans 844 feet (257 m) as one continuous contour that follows the rolling hills, expansion, and contraction of the landscape. The sculpture's elevation is perpendicular to the fall of the land.

East-West/West-East (2014), located on an east-west axis in the Brouq Nature Reserve in Qatar, was commissioned by Sheika al-Mayassa al-Thani of Qatar. It consists of four steel plates either 54 3/4 or 48 1/2 feet (16.7 or 14.8 m) high. The plates are placed at irregular intervals in a valley that runs between two gypsum plateaus. The plates are level with each other and the elevation of the adjacent plateaus. The work spans less than a kilometer and all plates are visible from either end.

=== Urban works ===
In the landscape, the sculptural elements draw the viewer's attention to the topology of the land as its walked. Serra's site-specific Urban sculptures focus the viewer's attention on the sculpture itself. Their locations often more accessible to the public than the landscape works, invite the viewer to walk inside, pass through and move around them. Because of the confines of Urban architecture, sculptures such as Sight Point (1972–1975) at the Stedelijk Museum, The Netherlands; Terminal (1977) in Bochum, Germany; T.W.U. (1980) at the Deichtorhallen, Hamburg, Germany; Fulcrum (1986–87), installed in Broadgate, London; Exchange (1996) at the edge of Luxembourg City; or 7 (2011) on a pier in Doha, Qatar, reflect the verticality of their surrounding architecture. Outdoor sculptures like St. John's Rotary Arc (1980) temporarily installed outside the Holland Tunnel entrance in New York City; Tilted Arc (1981) installed and later removed from New York City's Federal Plaza; Clara-Clara (1983), temporarily installed at Tuileries, Place de la Concorde, Paris; Berlin Junction (1987) installed outside the Berlin Philharmonic; are all curved forms or arcs that open and close depending on the direction the viewer takes walking around them.

Sight Point (1972–1975) was Serra's first vertical Urban work and a continuation of the balance and counterbalance principles of his earlier work Prop. Sight Point stands outside the Stedelijk Museum, Amsterdam, the Netherlands, consisting of three vertical steel plates 10 feet (3 m) wide and 40 feet (12 m) high that lean in at an angle and forming a triangular space on the ground with three openings that can be walked through. Once inside the viewer can look up and see the sky framed by the triangular shape made by the leaning plates.

Another vertical sculpture, Terminal (1977), was conceived for "Documenta VI" in 1977. It was permanently installed on a traffic island between the street car tracks in front of a train station in Bochum, Germany. Serra chose the site because of its proximity to a high-traffic area. Exchange (1996), sited in a vehicular round-about on top of a highway tunnel, made of seven trapezoidal plates. The sculpture stands 60 feet (18 m) high and can be seen by drivers as they enter and leave the City of Luxembourg.

In 1980 Serra installed two sculptures, with the support of the Public Art Fund, in New York City. T.W.U. (1980) and St. John's Rotary Arc (1980) were each placed in areas where traffic and people converged. T.W.U, a vertical sculpture consisting of three vertical plates, each 36 feet (11 m) high, was installed at a subway entrance near West Broadway between Leonard and Franklin Streets. The sculpture is now permanently installed outside the Deichterhallen, Hamburg, Germany. St. John's Rotary Arc, one of Serra's earliest curved sculptures, was 12 feet (3.6 m) high and spanned 180 feet (55 m). From 1980 to 1988 the site-specific sculpture was installed on the rotary at the entrance and exit to the Holland Tunnel.

In 1981, a second site-specific curved sculpture Tilted Arc (1981) was installed in New York City's Federal Plaza. Commissioned by the U.S. General Services Administration's Art-in-Architecture Program following a rigorous selection process, the sculpture's arc spanned 120 feet (36 m) and 12 feet (3.6 m) high. The sculpture was a curve that tilted and leaned away from its base. It was anchored into the plaza at both ends so that the center of the sculpture was raised. Serra's intention for the sculpture was to draw pedestrians' attention to the sculpture as they crossed the plaza. Tilted Arc was met with resistance by workers in the Federal building. An eight-year campaign to remove the sculpture ensued and Tilted Arc was ultimately removed on March 15, 1989. In Serra's defense to preserve the sculpture he stated "To remove Tilted Arc, therefore, is to destroy it", advocating it was a site-specific artwork designed for the Federal Plaza in New York City, and its form, meaning, and purpose were inseparable from that exact location. Following the hearing and GSA's decision, Serra responded that he would deny his authorship of Tilted Arc if it were relocated. and would consider it a "derivative work". The case of Tilted Arc continues to highlight the tension surrounding the nature of public art and its intended audience.

=== Gallery works ===
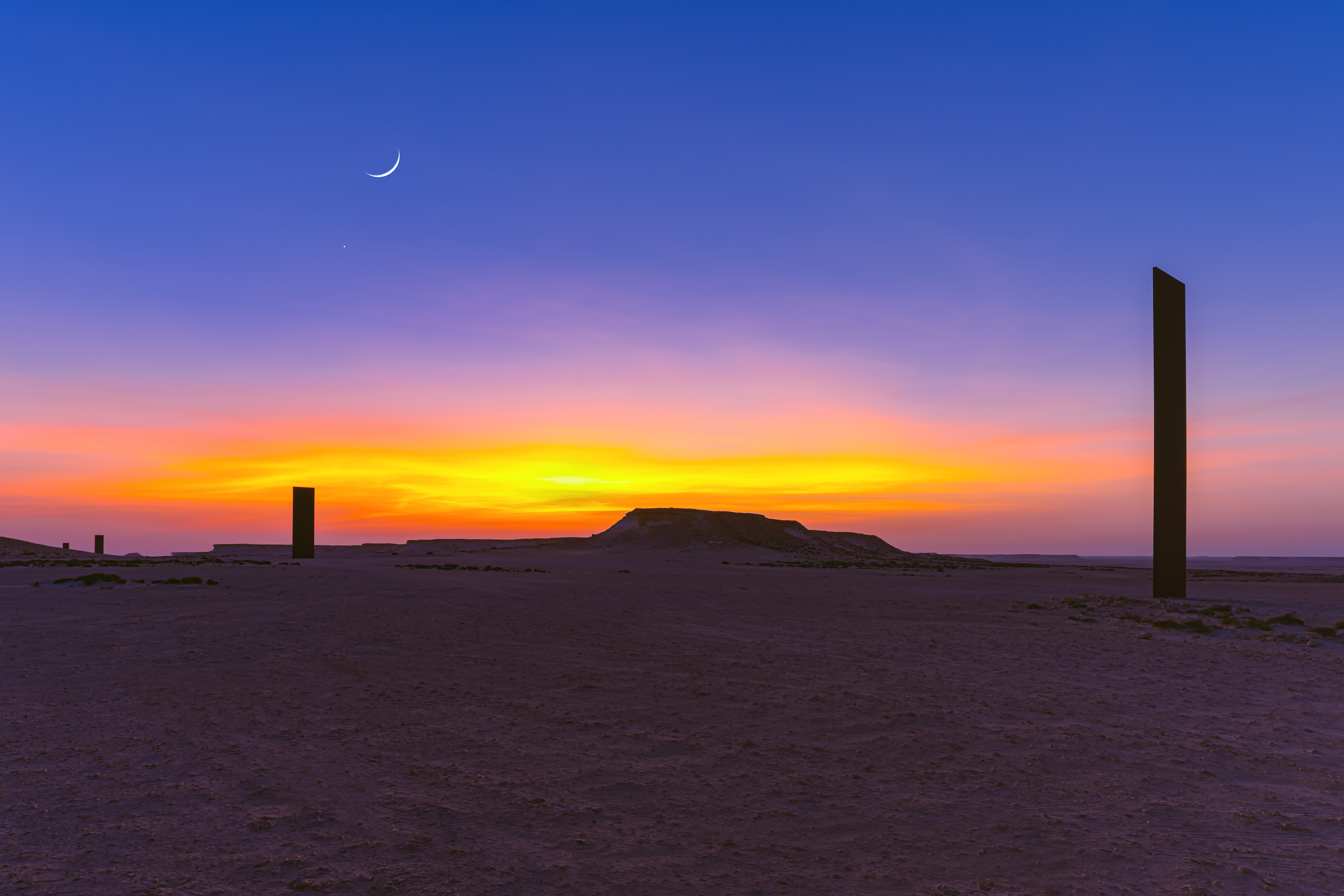
East-West/West-East (2014) by Richard Serra in Zekreet, Qatar

Serra's work has enjoyed numerous exhibitions in gallery and museum settings. His site-specific gallery installations are sometimes used to test ideas. Serra's first U.S. solo exhibition was at the Leo Castelli Warehouse, New York City in 1969. There he exhibited ten lead Prop Pieces, a Scatter Piece: Cutting Device: Base Plate Measure (1969), and a Splash Piece: Splashing with Four Molds (To Eva Hesse) (1969).

After his process-based works of the late 1960s and early 1970s, Serra began to solely use rolled or forged steel in his sculpture. Berlin Block (for Charlie Chaplin) (1977) was Serra's first forged sculpture. Made for the plaza outside the Neue Nationalgalerie in Berlin, designed by Ludwig Mies van der Rohe, the sculpture weighs 70 tons. His other forged sculptures include Elevation for Mies (1985–88) at Museum Haus Esters, Krefeld, Germany; Philibert et Marguerite (1985), in the Musee de Brou, Bourg-en-Bresse, France; Weight and Measure (1992), a temporary site-specific installation at the Tate Gallery, London; Santa Fe Depot (2004), in the Museum of Contemporary Art San Diego; and Equal (2015) in the Museum of Modern Art, New York.

Serra's most known series of sculptures using rolled steel plates are the Torqued Ellipses. In 1991 Serra visited Borromini's Church of San Carlo alle Quattro Fontane in Rome and mistook the ovals of the dome and the floor to be offset from one another. He thought to make a sculpture in this torqued form. Serra constructed models of this perceived form in his studio by cutting two ellipse-shaped pieces of wood and nailing a dowel between them. He then turned the ellipses so they were at a right angle to one another and wrapped a sheet of lead around the form. After making a template from the models Serra worked with an engineer to fabricate the sculptures. In total there are seven Torqued Ellipses and four Double Torqued Ellipses (an ellipse inside of an ellipse) dated between 1996 and 2004. Each sculpture has a different degree or torque and measures up to 13 feet (3.9 m) high. The sculptures all have an opening so that they can be walked through and around. Three Torqued Ellipses are on permanent view at Dia Beacon, New York. In 2005 "The Matter of Time", a commissioned installation, opened at the Guggenheim Museum Bilbao in Spain. Consisting of eight sculptures spanning a decade from 1994 to 2005, "The Matter of Time" highlights the evolution of Serra's sculptural forms. Serra chose to include five sculptures derived from the initial torqued ellipse: one single, one double ellipse, and three torqued spirals. The Torqued Spirals followed after the Double Torqued Ellipses when Serra decided to connect a double ellipses into one wound form that can be entered and walked through. The remaining sculptures in "The Matter of Time" are one closed (Blind Spot Reversed) and one open (Between the Torus and the Sphere) torus and spherical sculpture; and Snake: made of three parts, each comprising two identical conical sections inverted relative to each other and spanning 104 feet (31.7 m) overall. The sculptures are organized by Serra with intention. The direction which the viewer moves through the space creates a sensation of varying scale and proportion, and an awareness to the passing of time.

Equal (2015) at the Museum of Modern Art in 2022

In 2008 Serra participated in Monumenta, an annual exhibition held in Paris's Grand Palais featuring a single artist. For Monumenta Serra installed a single sculpture, Promenade (2008), consisting of five plates, each 55 feet (16.8 m) tall and 13 feet (4 m) wide, placed 100 feet (30 m) apart from one another across the cavernous interior of the Grand Palais. Overall, the sculpture spanned 656 feet (200 m). The plates were not placed in a line but stood side to side off the Grand Palais's center axis. They tilted either left or right, leaned either toward or away from another, and the viewer as they strolled around them.

Four Rounds: Equal Weight, Unequal Measure (2017) at Glenstone in 2022

The sculpture Equal (2015), in the collection of The Museum of Modern Art, New York, consists of eight forged blocks. Each block measures 5 by 5 1/2 by 6 feet (1.5 × 1.7 × 1.8 m) and weighs 40 tons. The blocks are stacked in pairs and positioned on their longer or shorter sides so that each stack measures 11 feet (3.4 m) tall. When walking amongst the four stacks the viewer becomes aware of their own sense of weight, balance, and gravity in relation to the sculptures.

Four Rounds: Equal Weight, Unequal Measure (2017), consisting of four 82-ton (74 t) forged cylinders of varying dimensions is permanently installed at Glenstone in Potomac, Maryland. The sculpture is installed within a building designed by Thomas Phifer of Thomas Phifer and Partners, in collaboration with Serra to highlight the sculpture's mass within the confines of the building's interior.

=== Drawings ===
Drawing was integral to Serra's practice. He made drawings on large sheets of canvas or handmade paper. They include horizontal or vertical compositions; constructions of overlapping sheets; or line drawings. His drawings were primarily done in paintstick, lithographic crayon, or charcoal and are always black. Serra experiments with different techniques and tools to manipulate and apply the medium. He often pushes the conventions of drawing towards a tactile, phenomenological experience of movement, time, and space. The artist said that his drawing practice is involved with "repetition, knowing there's no possibility of repeating, knowing that it's going to yield something different each time".

After his break into space with sculptures like Strike: To Roberta and Rudy (1969–1971), Serra became interested in redefining architectural space with drawing as well. In 1974 Serra started to make his Installation Drawings—large-scale site-specific sheets of canvas completely covered in paintstick and stapled to the wall. The Installation Drawings cover the wall, or walls, of a given space. Shafrazi and Zadikians were two of Serra's first Installation Drawings. Both were exhibited at Leo Castelli Gallery, New York City in 1974 and measured approximately 10 1/2 feet (3.2 m) high and 18 feet (5.5 m) wide overall. Serra continued to make Installation Drawing throughout his career. Other notable drawing series include: Diptychs (1989)^{;} Dead Weight (1991–92); Weight and Measure (1993–94); Videy Afangar (1989–1991); Rounds (1996–97); out-of-rounds (1999–2000); Line Drawings (2000–2002); Solids (2008)^{;} Greenpoint Rounds (2009); Elevational Weights (2010); Rifts (2011–2018); Transparencies (2011–2013); Horizontal Reversals (2014) Rambles (2015–16); Composites (2016); Horizontals and Verticals (2016–17); and Orchard Street (2018).

National and international survey exhibitions of Serra's drawings have included Richard Serra: Tekeningen/Drawings 1971–1977 at the Stedelijk Museum, Amsterdam in 1978; Richard Serra: Tekeningen/Drawings at the Bonnefantenmuseum, Maastrict in 1990; Richard Serra Drawing: A Retrospective at The Metropolitan Museum of Art, New York, the San Francisco Museum of Modern Art, and Menil Collection, Houston from 2011 to 2012; and Richard Serra: Drawings 2015–2017: Rambles, Composites, Rotterdam Verticals, Rotterdam Horizontals, Rifts at the Museum Boijmans van Beuningen. Rotterdam, The Netherlands in 2017.

=== Prints ===
Richard Serra, Level IV, 2010, One color etching, 29 x 65 inches

Serra began making prints in 1972. Working closely with Gemini G.E.L. in Los Angeles, he developed unconventional printing techniques. He made over 200 printed works and like his sculpture and drawing, his prints reflect an interest in process, scale, and experimentation with material.

His early lithographs starting in 1972 include the prints Circuit; Balance; Eight by Eight; or 183rd & Webster Avenue, each titled after a sculpture created around the same time. In 1981 Serra produced his first lithograph series comprising seven editions, titled: Sketch #1 through Sketch #7. That same year Serra begin to make larger-scale prints such as Malcolm X; Goslar, or The Moral Majority Sucks.

After pushing lithography to its limit, Serra began to work with silkscreen to produce a unique surface in his prints. He did so by first applying a layer of ink onto the paper. He then would apply a layer of paint stick through the second screen creating a saturated and textured surface.

Serra continued to work this his silkscreen technique, sometimes combining it with etching and aquatint. His print series include: Videy Afanger (1991); Hreppholer (1991); WM (1996); Rounds (1999); Venice Notebook (2001); Between the Torus and the Sphere (2006); Paths and Edges (2007); Level (2008); Junction (2010); Reversal (2015); Elevational Weight (2016); Equal (2018); and (?) (2019).

=== Films and video works ===
From 1968 to 1979 Serra made a collection of films and videos. Although he began working with sculpture and film at the same time, Serra recognized the different material capacities of each and did not extend sculptural problems into his films and videos. Serra collaborated with several artists including Joan Jonas, Nancy Holt, and Robert Fiore, on his films and videos. His first films, Hand Catching Lead (1968), Hands Scraping (1968) and Hand Tied (1968) involve a series of actions: a hand tries to catch falling lead; pairs of hands move lead shavings; and bound hands untie themselves.

A later film Railroad Turnbridge (1976) frames the surrounding landscape of the Willamette River in Portland, Oregon, as the bridge turns. Steelmill/Stahwerk (1979), made in collaboration with the art historian Clara Weyergraf is divided in two parts. The first part is made up of interviews of German steel factory workers about their work. The second part captures the forging of Serra's sculpture Berlin Block (for Charlie Chaplin).

Survey exhibitions and screenings of his films have been held at the Kunstmuseum Basel, Switzerland in 2017; Anthology Film Archives, New York, October 17–23, 2019; and Harvard Film Archive, January 27 – February 9, 2020. In 2019, Serra donated his entire film and video works to the Museum of Modern Art in Manhattan, New York.

== Exhibitions ==
Serra's first solo exhibition was in 1966 at Galleria Salita in Rome, Italy. His first solo exhibition in the U.S. was at the Leo Castelli Warehouse, New York in 1969. His first solo museum exhibition was held at the Pasadena Art Museum in Pasadena, California in 1970. The first retrospective of his work was held at the Museum of Modern Art, New York, in 1986. A second retrospective was held at The Museum of Modern Art, New York in 2007.

The first survey exhibition of his drawings was held at the Stedelijk Museum Amsterdam in 1977 and traveled to the Kunsthalle Tübingen in 1978. A second retrospective of drawings was presented at The Metropolitan Museum of Art, New York City; the San Francisco Museum of Modern Art; and The Menil Collection, Houston from 2011 to 2012. An overview of the artist's work in film and video was on view at the Kunstmuseum Basel, in 2017.

Serra enjoyed solo exhibitions at the Staatliche Kunsthalle Baden-Baden, 1978; Museum Boijmans Van Beuningen, Rotterdam, 1980; Musée National d'Art Moderne, Centre Pompidou, Paris, 1983–1984; Museum Haus Lange, Krefeld, 1985; The Museum of Modern Art, New York, 1986 and 2007; Louisiana Museum of Modern Art, Humlebæk, 1986; Westphalian State Museum of Art and Cultural History, Münster, 1987; Städtische Galerie im Lenbachhaus, Munich, 1987; Stedelijk Van Abbemuseum, Eindhoven, 1988; Bonnefantenmuseum, Maastricht, 1990; Kunsthaus Zürich, 1990; CAPC Musée d'Art Contemporain, Bordeaux, 1990; Museo Nacional Centro de Arte Reina Sofía, Madrid, 1992; Kunstsammlung Nordrhein-Westfalen, Düsseldorf, 1992; Dia Center for the Arts, New York, 1997; Museum of Contemporary Art, Los Angeles, 1998–1999; Centro de Arte Hélio Oiticica, Rio de Janeiro, 1997–1998; Trajan's Market, Rome, 1999–2000; Pulitzer Foundation for the Arts, St. Louis, 2003; National Archaeological Museum, Naples, 2004; and Museum Boijmans Van Beuningen, Rotterdam, in 2017.

== Collections ==
Serra's work is included in many museums and public collections around the world. Selected museum collections which own his work include The Museum of Modern Art, New York; The Whitney Museum of American Art, New York; Art Gallery of Ontario, Toronto; Art Institute of Chicago; Bonnefantenmuseum, Maastricht, The Netherlands; Centre Cultural Fundació La Caixa, Barcelona; Centre Georges Pompidou, Musée National d'Art Moderne, Paris; Modern Art Museum of Fort Worth, Texas; Dia Art Foundation, New York; Guggenheim Museum Bilbao and New York; Pérez Art Museum Miami, Florida; Hamburger Kunsthalle, Hamburg, Germany; Hirshhorn Museum and Sculpture Garden, Smithsonian Institution, Washington, DC; Moderna Museet, Stockholm; and Glenstone Museum, Potomac, Maryland.

Selected public collections which hold his work include City of Bochum, Germany; City of Chicago, Public Art Collection; City of Goslar, Germany; City of Hamburg, Germany; City of St. Louis, Missouri; City of Tokyo, Japan; City of Berlin, Germany; City of Paris, France; Collection City of Reykjavík, Iceland.

== Personal life ==
Serra moved to New York City in 1966. He bought a house in Cape Breton, Nova Scotia in 1970 and spent summers working there. He and art historian Clara Weyergraf married in 1981. As of 2019, Serra maintained a home in Manhattan and studios in Nova Scotia and the North Fork of Long Island. His brother is noted San Francisco attorney Tony Serra.

Richard Serra died from pneumonia at his home in Orient, New York, on March 26, 2024, at the age of 85.

== Awards and honors ==
Serra is the recipient of many notable prizes and awards including the Fulbright Grant (1965–66); Guggenheim Fellowship (1970); République Française, Ministère de la Culture et de la Communication Chevalier de l'Ordre des Arts et des Lettres (1985 and 1991); Japan Arts Association, Tokyo Praemium Imperiale (1994); a Leone d'Oro for lifetime achievement, Venice Biennale, Italy (2001); American Academy of Arts and Letters (2001); Orden pour le Mérite für Wissenschaften und Künste, Federal Republic of Germany (2002); Orden de las Artes y las Letras de España, Spain (2008); The National Arts Award: Lifetime Achievement Award (bestowed by Americans for the Arts 2014); Hermitage Museum Foundation's Award for Lifetime Contributions to the World of Art (2014); Chevalier de l'Ordre national de la Légion d'honneur, Republic of France (2015); Landesmuseum Wiesbaden Alexej-von-Jawlensky-Preis (2017); and a J. Paul Getty Medal (2018).

== Writings and interviews ==
Gathered in the following three anthologies is a comprehensive collection of writings by, and interviews with, the artist:

- Richard Serra: Writings/Interviews. Chicago and London: University of Chicago Press. August 15, 1994. ISBN 978-0-226-74880-1. OL 9651745M. Includes writings by the artist and interviews by Friedrich Teja Bach, Liza Béar, Patricia E. Bickers, Lizzie Borden, Lynne Cooke, Douglas Crimp, Peter Eisenman, Mark Francis, Bernard Lamarche-Vadel, Annette Michelson, Robert C. Morgan, Alfred Pacquement, Brenda Richardson, Mark Rosenthal, Nicholas Serota, David Sylvester, and Clara Weyergraf
- Richard Serra, Interviews, Etc., 1970–1980. Yonkers, New York: Hudson River Museum. 1980. OCLC 9946126. OL 4124913M. Written and compiled by Richard Serra in collaboration with Clara Weyergraf; includes interviews by Friedrich Teja Bach, Liza Béar, Lizzie Borden, Douglas Crimp, Bernard Lamarche-Vadel, and Clara Weyergraf
- Richard Serra, Schriften, Interviews 1970–1989. Bern: Benteli Verlag. 1990. OCLC 950242621. German translation of the 1980 Hudson River Museum publication with additional contributions by Thomas Beller, Peter Eisenman, Philip Glass, Gerard Hovagymyan, Robert C. Morgan, Alfred Pacquement, Brenda Richardson, and Harald Szeemann

== Actor ==
Serra plays an architect who is a third level Mason in artist and filmmaker Matthew Barney's Cremaster 3 from the director's five-part Cremaster Cycle.

== Selected writing ==
All are solely by Richard Serra unless indicated otherwise.

- "Play it Again, Sam," Arts Magazine 44, no. 4 (February 1970), pp. 24–27
- "Verb List, 1967–68," First published in Avalanche [New York], no. 2 (Winter 1971), pp. 20–21
- "Skullcracker Stacking Series," In Scott, Gail R., A Report on the Art & Technology Program of the Los Angeles County Museum of Art 1967–1971, pp. 299–300, Los Angeles: Los Angeles County Museum of Art, 1971
- Jackson, Ward, and Richard Serra; "Richard Serra," Art Now: New York 3, no. 3 (September 1971), p. 4
- Serra, Richard, "Statements," Artforum 10, no. 1 (September 1971), p. 64
- "On Frame, on Color-Aid," Artforum 10, no. 1 (September 1971), p. 64
- Jonas, Joan, and Richard Serra; "Paul Revere," Artforum 10, no. 1 (September 1971), pp. 65–67
- Serra, Richard, and Rosalind Krauss; ed. "Shift." Arts Magazine 47, no. 6 (April 1973), pp. 49–55
- Serra, Richard, and Clara Weyergraf; "St. John's Rotary Arc," Artforum 19, no. 1 (September 1980), pp. 52–55
- "Notes from Sight Point Road," Originally published in Perspecta: The Yale Architectural Journal, no. 19 (1982), pp. 172–81
- Edited and printed as "Extended Notes from Sight Point Road" in Richard Serra: Neuere Skulpturen in Europa 1977–1985 (Eine Auswahl)/Recent Sculpture in Europe 1977–1985 (Selected), pp. 11–15
- "Letter from Richard Serra to President Ronald Reagan" [in Portuguese and English], Lo Spazio Umano [Portugal], no. 2 (April–July 1985), pp. 89–92, bilingual, Portuguese and English
- "Serra Writes the President," Art & Artists 14, no. 3 (May–June 1985), special supplement, pp. 3, 22
- "Notes on Drawing," First published in Güse, Ernst-Gerhard, ed. Richard Serra, pp. 66–68, New York: Rizzoli, 1988
- "Weight," In Richard Serra: 10 Sculptures for the Van Abbe, pp. 10–12, Exh. cat. Stedelijk Van Abbemuseum, Eindhoven, 1988, bilingual in Dutch and English
- "'Tilted Arc'—A Precedent?" [letter to the editor], The New York Times, April 30, 1989, sec. 2, p. 5
- "'Tilted Arc' Destroyed," Art in America 77, no. 5 (May 1989), pp. 34–47, cover
- "Artists Have Rights to Their Works," The Des Moines Sunday Register, October 29, 1989, pp. 3C
- "The Yale Lecture, January 1990," Kunst & Museumjournaal [Amsterdam: English edition] 1, no. 6 (1990), pp. 23–33
- "Art and Censorship". Critical Inquiry. 17 (3): 574–581. April 1991. doi:10.1086/448597.
- "Afangar Series," Open City, no. 2 (1993), pp. 101–7
- "Donald Judd, 1928-1994" [eulogy. Parkett, nos. 40–41 (1994), pp. 176–79
- "Basel, 18. January 1994/Basel, January 18, 1994," In Martin Schwander, ed., Richard Serra: Intersection Basel, pp. 72–79, Basel: Christoph Merian Verlag and Düsseldorf: Richter Verlag, 1996, ISBN 9783928762526. OCLC 37725722
- "Notes on The Matter of Time," In Richard Serra: The Matter of Time, p. 141, Bilbao: Museo Guggenheim Bilbao, and Göttingen: Steidl Verlag, 2005, ISBN 9788495216434, OCLC 66529716
