= The Shift (2010 film) =

- Directed by: David Trumble
- Screenplay by: David Trumble; Matt Brothers
- Story by: Greg Lock
- Produced by: David Trumble
- Starring: Greg Lock; Graham Hornsby
- Release date: 15 April 2010
- Running time: 15 minutes
- Country: United Kingdom
- Language: English
- Budget: £3,000

The Shift is a short film directed by David Trumble, starring Greg Lock and Graham Hornsby. The film, written by David Trumble, Matt Brothers, and Greg Lock, focuses on a paramedic and Emergency Medical Technician (EMT) working for the London Ambulance Service on a night shift.

== Plot ==
The protagonist Damon Yorke, played by Greg Lock is a young but highly valued and experienced London based paramedic. Damon is having some relationship problems with his girlfriend Clare and is being forced to attend couples counseling. Damon is advised to try phoning Clare just before she goes to bed, whilst he is on shift work, just to reassure her that he is okay and that he loves her. However, on the first night shift when he wants to try this new system he accidentally leaves his phone at home.

His crewmate, EMT Joe Greene (played by Graham Hornsby), claims to have left his phone back at the ambulance station. So, Damon begins a personal quest to try to find a phone so he can call Clare. The only problem is, Damon is confronted by the many incidents any ambulance would encounter on a night shift, ranging from the trivial to the serious, and these keep getting in his way. Consequently, Damon's anger and frustrations with his personal life come to the surface, and something's got to give.

== Cast ==
- Greg Lock as Damon Yorke
- Graham Hornsby as Joe Greene
- Debbie Wicks as Clare
- Liam H. Dempsey as Security Guard
- Victoria Eldon as Sister
- Charlotte Eldon as Electrocuted Girl
- Tommy Egerton as Old Lady
- Kathryn Ritchie as Emma
- Eifion Robert Melnyk-Jones as Llewelyn

== Production ==
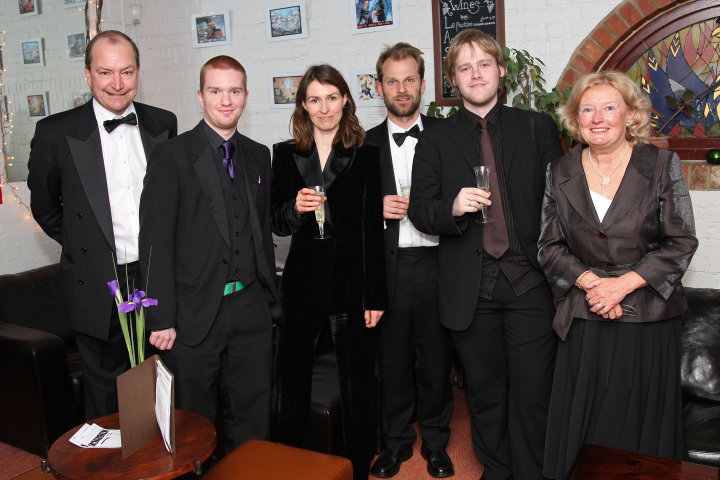
David Trumble and Greg Lock at the premiere of The Shift with David Williams, Helen Baxendale and members of the Oxford Community Foundation

The film was shot over the course of five nights, with an ambulance hired for two of them. The majority of the filming took place in Bournemouth, England. Even though the film takes place in London, only Damon's flat and the riverside (with Canary Wharf in the background) were the only actual locations actually filmed in London.

Adam Scarth, Director of Photography, shot the film on a Canon 7D, assisted by Noorganah Robertson and Thomas Saville.

== Charity gala premiere ==
The Shift was first shown as part of a charity screening of David Williams' mockumentary Beyond the Pole (2010), at The Phoenix Picture House in Oxford, on 15 April 2010. The screening was organised by the Oxford Community Foundation to raise money for the charity. Both the director (Williams) and star (Helen Baxendale) of Beyond the Pole attended the event. The Shift was shown as the first part of the evening.
