= Hospice Palliative Care Ontario =

Organization

Hospice Palliative Care Ontario (HPCO) is an organization whose members provide end-of-life palliative care to terminal patients in the province of Ontario, Canada. It is the result of an April 2011 merger of the Hospice Association of Ontario (HOA) and the Ontario Palliative Care Association (OPCA). It is one of twelve primary care practitioner units participating in the development of advance care planning in Canada led by the Canadian Hospice Palliative Care Association and partly funded by the Canadian Institutes of Health Research.

== Background ==
By the 1980s, Ontario lagged other provinces with respect to the development of palliative care. It was a foundational decade for palliative care in the province, by the end of which two separate palliative care organizations were operational. The Hospice Association of Ontario was more focussed on residential hospice organizations, whereas the scope of operations of the Ontario Palliative Care Association was more broadly represented by organizations tending to dying patients in hospital and other settings.

Hospice Association of Ontario was founded in 1989 with eight members; as of April, 2005, it had over 150 member hospice facilities. It was primarily based on volunteer efforts. In 2000, hospice agencies in more than 400 communities throughout Ontario organized over 12,000 volunteers under the auspice of HAO, most through private funding.

By 2004, Cancer Care Ontario "identified palliative care as a priority area". In 2005 the Government of Ontario announced an "end-of-life care strategy" to be implemented by the Ministry of Health and Long-Term Care to improve the availability of home-based and community palliative care services. The three-year project invested CA$115.5 million to establish a hospice palliative care network in each of the 14 Local Health Integration Networks throughout the province, increase home care nursing and support services, and to expand residential hospices and their volunteer networks.

In 2008, the Hospice Association of Ontario membership grew significantly, partly a result of the end-of-life care strategy and increased community acceptance of palliative care.

The members of the organization operate hospice services that "relieve suffering and improve the quality of living and dying".

In 2009, the two organizations established the Quality Hospice Palliative Care Coalition with Cancer Care Ontario, Hospice Palliative Care Networks, and the Ontario College of Family Physicians. It is a provincial consortium whose goal is to advance and integrate palliative care throughout the province.

== End-of-Life Information Service ==
The End-of-Life Information Service is a telephone service which offers information about hospice palliative care services and resources, including:

- hospice palliative care programs, units and education
- community-based services
- pain and symptom management
- bereavement support services

It is funded by the Government of Ontario Ministry of Health and Long-Term Care.
