= Shift (sculpture) =

Sculpture by Richard Serra

Coordinates: 43°55′14″N 79°30′41″W

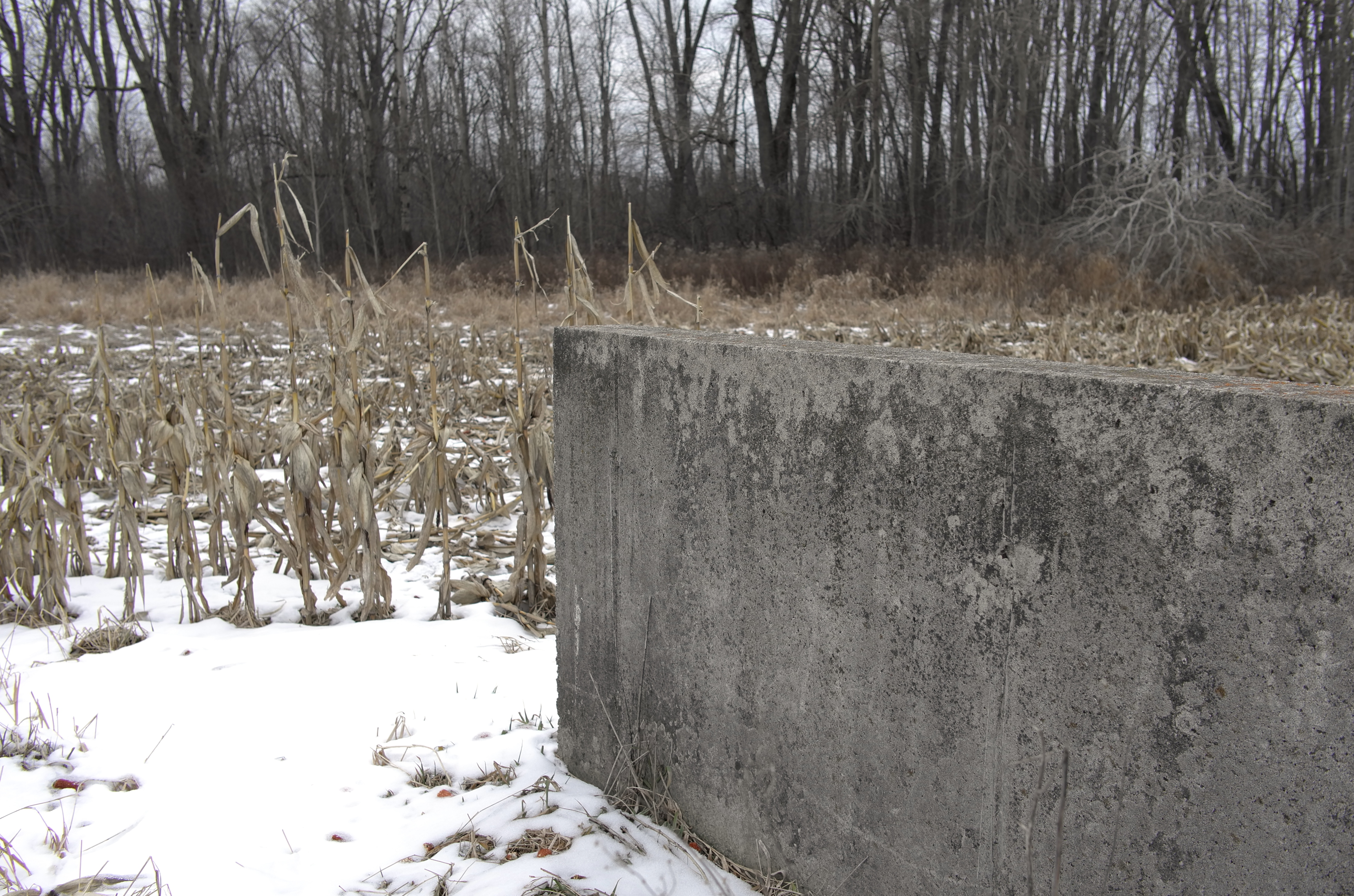
- Closeup of one end of Shift amidst a field of maize
- Artist: Richard Serra
- Year: 1972
- Type: Sculpture
- Medium: Concrete
- Dimensions: (60 in in × 8 in in × 90-240 feet per section in)
- Location: King City, Ontario, Canada

Shift is a large outdoor sculpture by American artist Richard Serra, located in King City, Ontario, Canada about 30 kilometers north of Toronto. The work was commissioned in 1970 by art collector Roger Davidson and installed on his family property. Shift consists of six large concrete forms, each 20 centimetres thick and 1.5 metres high, zigzagging over the northwest portion of the 4.03 hectares (40,300 m^{2}) property's rolling countryside. In 1990 the Township of King voted to designate Shift and the surrounding land as a protected cultural landscape under the Ontario Heritage Act. The property is now owned by a Toronto-based developer who announced in 2010 that they appeal the decision of the Ontario Conservation Review board with plans to develop the property for housing, necessitating the removal of Shift. In 2013 the Township of King voted to prepare a bylaw to designate Shift as protected under the Ontario Heritage Act, preventing its destruction or alteration.

== History ==
In the summer of 1970 Serra and artist Joan Jonas visited the site, a 13-acre potato farm in King Township. They discovered that if two people walked the distance of the land towards each other while keeping each other in view, they had to negotiate the contours of the land and walked in a zigzagged path. This determined the topographical definition of the space and the finished work would be the maximum distance two people could occupy while still in view of one another. The sculpture's construction began in 1970 and ended in 1972.

In 1973 Serra discussed Shift in Art in America:

What I wanted was a dialectic between one's perception of the place in totality and one's relation to the field as walked. The result is a way of measuring oneself against the indeterminacy of the land. As one follows the work farther into the field, one is forced to shift and turn with the work and look back across the elevational drop. From the top of the hill, looking back across the valley, images and thoughts are remembered which were initiated by the consciousness of having experienced them.

The land was owned by the family of Roger Davidson, an art collector. Serra approached Davidson with an idea to use the land for a site-specific sculpture. Davidson agreed in exchange for two of Serra's smaller sculptures. Ownership of the work was undetermined and as there was no contract, Serra understood that the work would be preserved on the land by the Davidson family and that the land would not be sold and would be accessible to the public.

In 1974, the land, registered in Davidson's mother's name, was sold to Hickory Hill Investments, a land developer. Land registry records made no mention of an artwork on the property. The Ontario government listed the land as protected under the Oak Ridges Moraine Conservation Act as a green space, while Shift is protected under Canadian copyright law as Serra is a landowner in Nova Scotia. The Toronto-based developer announced in 2010 planned to develop the property for housing. Shift and the surrounding land was designated a protected cultural landscape under the Ontario Heritage Act. In 2013 the Township of King voted to prepare a bylaw to designate Shift as protected under the Ontario Heritage Act, preventing its destruction or alteration.

== Description ==
Shift is made of concrete, the first of two concrete works Serra has created. He considers concrete to be too architectural for sculpture and usually works in steel. In both cases, Serra used concrete owing to the architectural scale of the works and the horizontal emphasis. Each of the six concrete sections is 60 inches in height and 8 inches in width while the length varies from 90 feet to 240 feet. These were built based on a land survey that Serra had commissioned. The sculpture is divided into two sections each containing three segments.

Shift was ignored for the most part by locals since the Davidsons sold the land. Residents thought it was a leftover foundation and the work survived in obscurity until talk of developing the land in the 1990s brought attention to the work's importance. The developers did not realize the value of the work when the land was purchased. Serra's studio estimates that a commission of this nature would now be valued at between US$7 and US$8 million.

Although protected from development, the sculpture is the target of vandalism and environmental exposure. In 2018, the sculpture was found to have cracks and scratches, as well as the "encroachment of weeds". No maintenance is performed on the sculpture.

== Bibliography ==
- Krauss, Rosalind E. "Richard Serra, a translation." The Originality of the Avant-Garde and Other Modernist Myths. Cambridge, MA: The MIT Press, 1985. 261-276. ISBN 0262110938
