= The Shift (2013 film) =

- Directed by: Lee Cipolla
- Written by: Leo Oliva
- Produced by: Leo Oliva
- Starring: Leo Oliva; Casey Fitzgerald; Genesis Ochoa; Danny Glover
- Production companies: Oliva Productions; M.A.D. Elephant Inc.
- Distributed by: Random Media; Shoreline Entertainment
- Release date: April 11, 2013 (Palm Beach)
- Running time: 75 minutes
- Country: United States
- Language: English

The Shift is a 2013 American drama film written by Leo Oliva, directed by Lee Cipolla and starring Oliva, Casey Fitzgerald, Genesis Ochoa and Danny Glover.

== Cast ==
- Danny Glover as Floyd
- Leo Oliva as Kayle
- Casey Fitzgerald as Amanda
- Genesis Ochoa as Emily
- Sara Castro as Carmen

== Production ==
Filming took place at the Los Angeles County/USC Medical Center. In November 2013, it was announced that Shoreline Entertainment acquired worldwide sales rights to the film.

== Release ==
The film was screened at the Muvico Parisian in Palm Beach, Florida on April 11, 2013. Then it was released on DVD, on VOD and on digital platforms on February 24, 2015.

== Award ==
The film won the Audience Favorite Award at the Palm Beach International Film Festival.
