= History of Ajax, Ontario =

The town of Ajax, Ontario in Canada evolved out of the Defence Industries Limited Pickering Works munitions plant built during the World War II, but its history begins much earlier.

The indigenous peoples were active in the watersheds of the Duffins Creek and the Carruthers Creek since the Archaic period (7000–1000 BCE), although they did not build any major settlements in the area. After the British conquest of New France in 1760, the area became part of the Pickering Township. The conversion of a local trail into the Kingston Road in 1799 contributed to increased settlement in area. In the first half of the 19th century, the Pickering Village, now a neighbourhood in Ajax, evolved as the major population centre of the Township, supported by a timber and agricultural boom. In the mid-19th century, Audley, a smaller community, emerged as a stopover on the route to the port of Whitby. By the 20th century, much of the area of present-day Ajax was farmland, and in the 1920s, the Pickering Beach developed as a cottage community.

After the start of the World War II in 1939, the Government of Canada expropriated most of the farmland in what is now southern part of Ajax, to establish a munitions plant. Operated by Defence Industries Limited (DIL), the government-owned plant employed workers from different parts of Canada. The plant site, along with the residences and the facilities established for the workers, evolved into a self-contained community which was named after the British warship HMS Ajax.

After the plant shut down in 1945, its site was used as a war surplus warehouse and sales outlet, a University of Toronto campus (1946–1949), and a holding camp for war refugees from Europe (1949–1953). The government mandated the Canada Mortgage and Housing Corporation (CMHC) to develop the site and its surrounding area into a modern industrial town. In 1950, Ajax was incorporated as an "improvement district", a form of local administration managed by the Lieutenant Governor's appointees. In 1954, it achieved full municipal status as a town, and an elected council took over the administration on 1 January 1955.

== Indigenous peoples ==
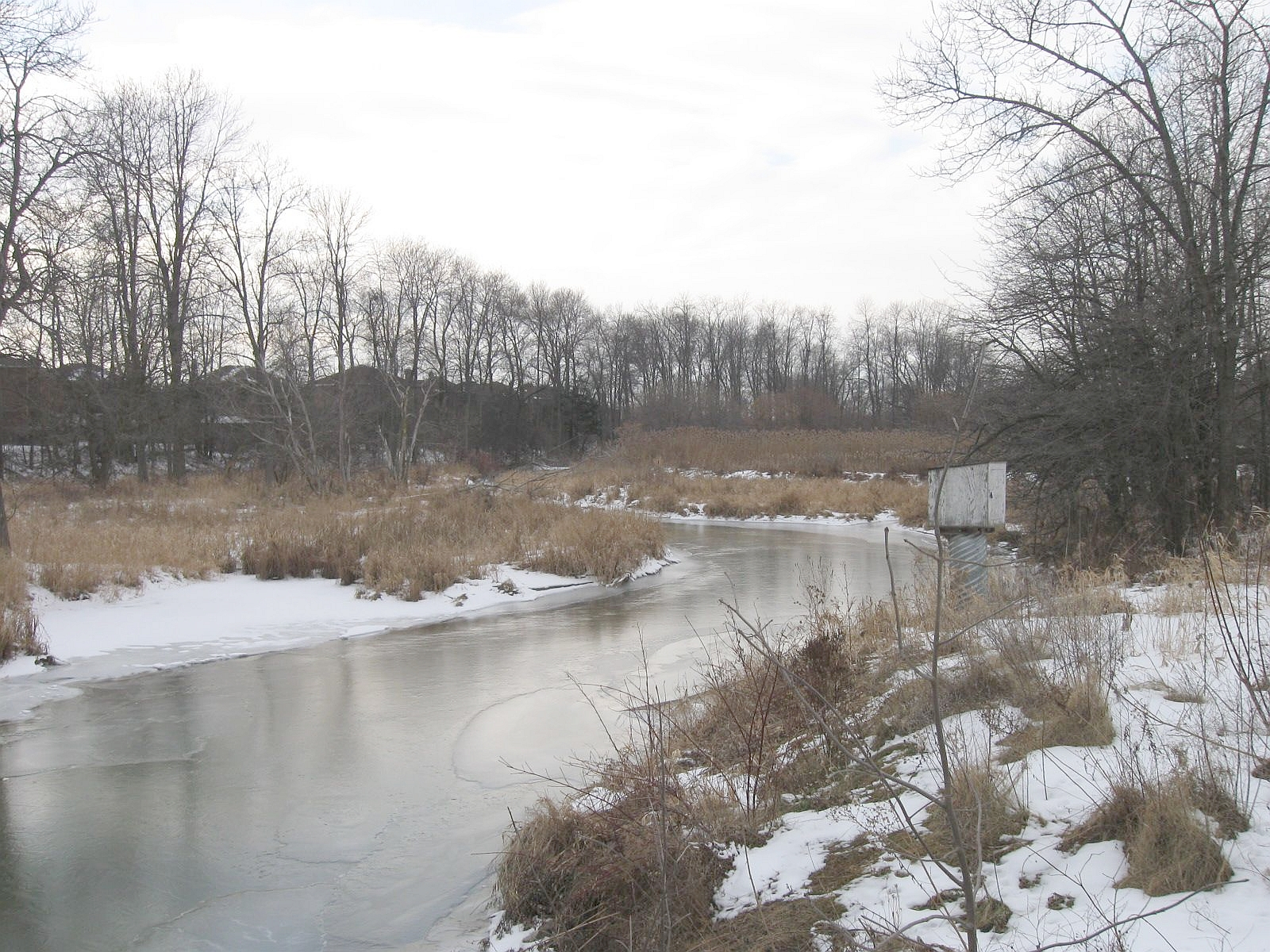
Carruthers Creek in eastern part of Ajax

Multiple archaeological sites identified with indigenous peoples are located in the watersheds of the Duffins Creek and the Carruthers Creek, in Ajax and surrounding areas. Projectile points from the Late Paleo-Indian period (10000–7000 BCE) have been discovered in the Duffins Creek watershed.

Scattered chert (flint) tools and flakes dated to Archaic period (7000–1000 BCE) have been discovered in both the watersheds. All these sites are located inland, but it is likely that the indigenous people were also active at the mouths of the streams. The areas where the streams met Lake Ontario at the end of the Last Glacial Period are now under water, which may explain the lack of any archaeological discoveries at the mouths of these streams.

Both watersheds also contain several sites from the early and middle Woodland period (1000 BCE-700 CE). Not much research has been done on these sites, but they appear to be short-term campsites.

In the mid-17th century, the Iroquois people displaced the Petun and the Wendat (Huron) peoples from what is now southern Ontario. The Iroquois Seneca people established river-side villages in nearby areas, such as Ganatsekwyagon on Rouge and Teiaiagon on Humber. However, the watersheds of the Duffins Creek and the Carruthers Creek in Ajax do not show evidence of similar settlements. This may be because of the poor navigability of these streams: Duffins Creek, the larger of the two streams, was navigable by canoes only until 6 km upstream. The presence of sand bar at its mouth prevented boats from entering it, further reducing its suitability for establishing a settlement. Nevertheless, it is likely that the indigenous people used the mouths of these creek for hunting and fishing.

Little is known about the indigenous peoples within the boundaries of present-day Ajax at the time of the first European settlements in the area. At least one Ojibwe family lived at the east edge of the Duffins Creek marshes until the mid-19th century.

== Early European settlers ==
In 1760, French Sulpician missionaries from Ganatsekwyagon reached Duffins Creek, but did not settle there. They were also aware of the existence of the smaller Carruthers Creek, although early French maps (such as Louis Jolliet's 1673 map) do not show this stream.

Like the rest of the Greater Toronto Area, the present-day Ajax was originally a part of the Montreal District of New France, and came under British control in 1760. After being formally ceded to the British in 1763, it became a part of the Province of Quebec. In 1788, it became a part of the Nassau District, which in 1791, became the Home District of Upper Canada. The area was a part of the Edinburgh Township of York County within the Home District. In 1792, the Edinburgh Township was renamed to Pickering Township.

Historical political divisions containing present-day Ajax

Canada, New France (1535-1763)

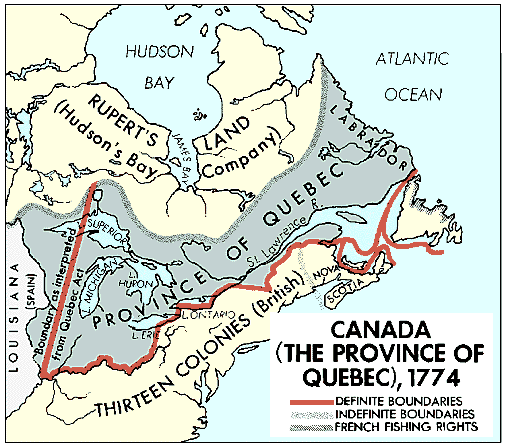
Province of Quebec (1763-1791)

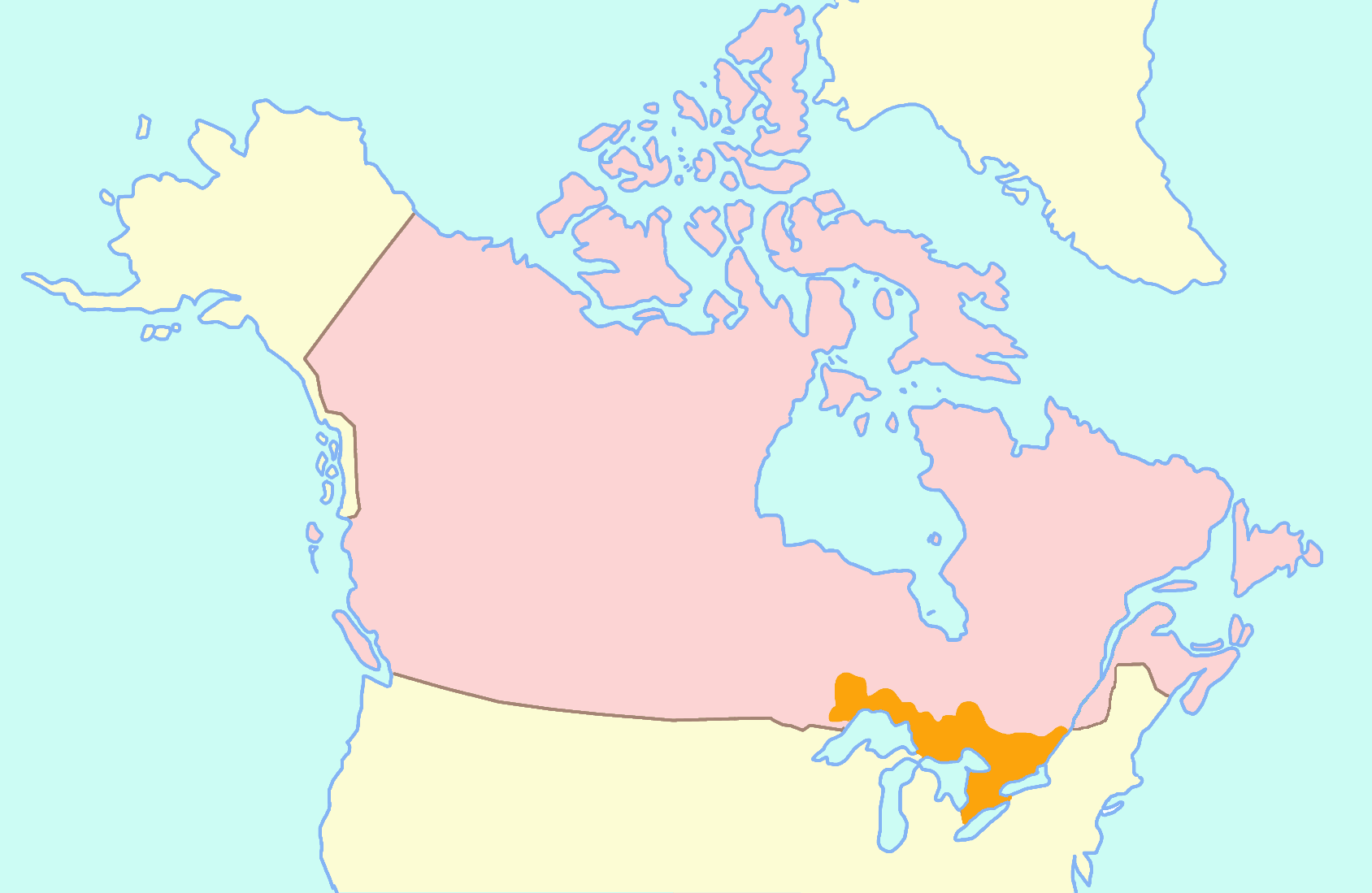
Upper Canada

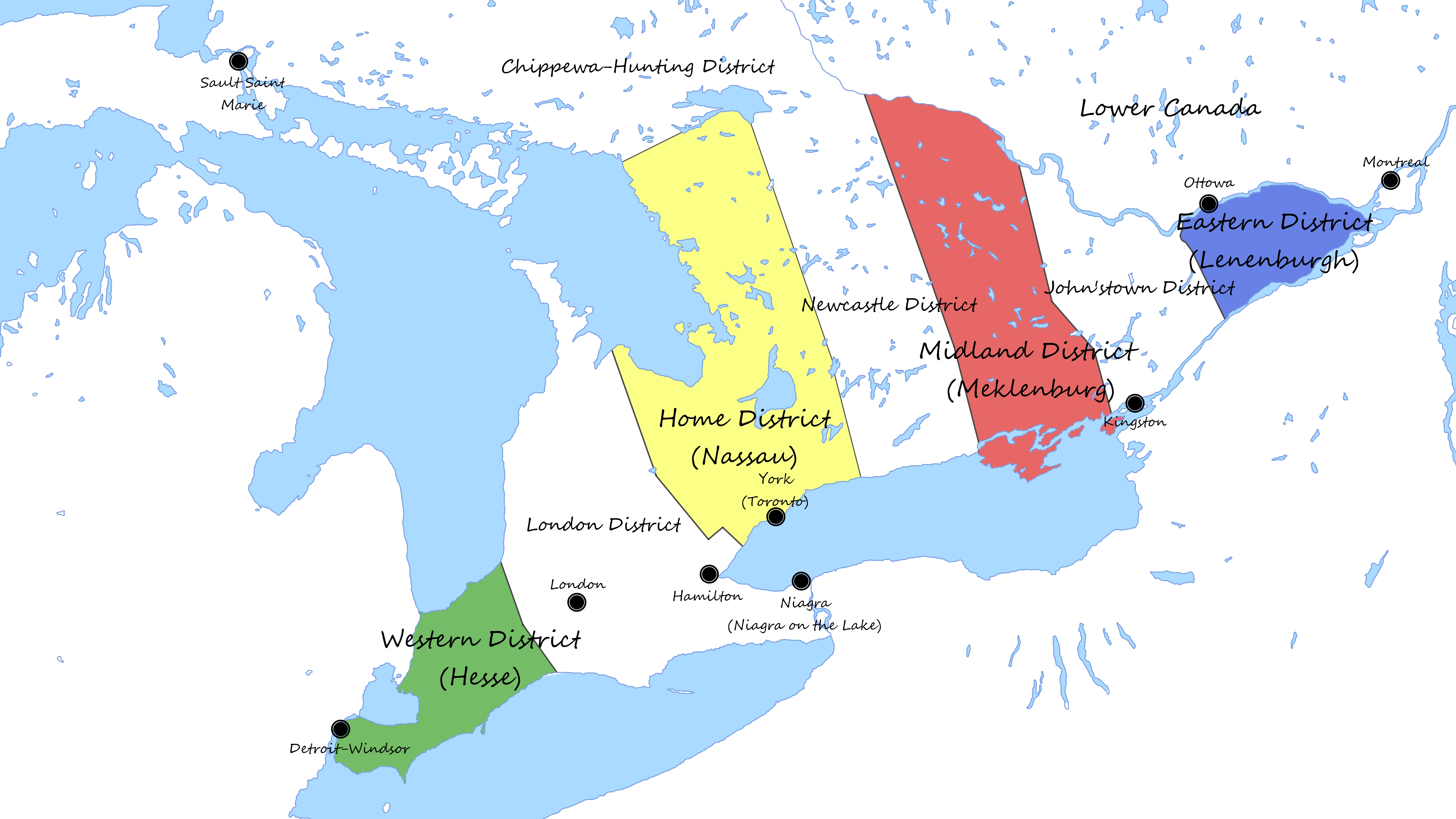
Home District and other districts of Upper Canada

Early European settlement in what is now Ajax began along a trail that later became the Kingston Road. Mike Duffin, an Irish fur trader, is the earliest known European to have settled in the area. In the 1770s, he arrived in what later became Pickering Village, and lived in a cabin located on the east side of the Creek, north of Kingston Road. A bachelor, he cleared a few acres of forest land, but survived mainly by fishing, hunting, and eating tubers. He was murdered around 1791, possibly by indigenous people or one of the travelers for whom he provided lodging. Augustus Jones, who surveyed the area for the Government of Upper Canada in 1791, named the Duffins Creek after him.

The first person to receive a land patent in the region was Major John Smith of 5th Regiment of Foot, stationed at Detroit. This grant of 5,000 acres of land included the part of present-day Ajax to the south of the 3rd Concession Line (later Rossland Road and Concession Road 3). His son David W. Smith, who was stationed at Detroit and Niagara, inherited this land from his father, and received another 1,200 acres of land.

Compared to other parts of the Greater Toronto Area, the Pickering Township developed slowly because much of the land was held by absentee landlords such as the Smith family, or held as Crown and Clergy reserves. The growth accelerated after Lieutenant Governor John Graves Simcoe proposed building a road linking London in the west to Kingston in the east. The government declared the major trail in the area as an extension of Toronto's Dundas Street, and in 1799, American contractor Asa Danforth Jr. converted the trail into Kingston Road. The new road greatly contributed to increased settlement in the present-day Ajax area.

In 1798, William Peak migrated from Hope Township, and settled in the Simcoe Point area, near the mouth of Duffins Creek. A Loyalist from the United States, he had received 200 acres of land from Lieutenant-Governor Simcoe. He traded goods with the natives, and also cleared a small plot of land for cultivation. He built a cabin in 1798 or 1799, and grew corn and potatoes.

A bigger settlement developed around the intersection of Duffins Creek and Kingston Road, gradually evolving into the Pickering Village. In 1807, American Quaker leader Timothy Rogers migrated to the Duffins Creek area with 20 other Quaker families, and settled around the intersection of Kingston Road and Mill Street. By 1809, the population of Pickering Township was 180 people, most of whom lived along the Duffins Creek. The area was still densely forested, and the settlers frequently encountered wild animals including bears.

In 1808, James Powell migrated from New Brunswick and settled in the Carruthers Creek watershed in the eastern part of present-day Ajax. Another prominent early settler was George Washington Post, who purchased a lot in May 1812, and built the Post Inn in 1814.

== Timber and agricultural boom ==
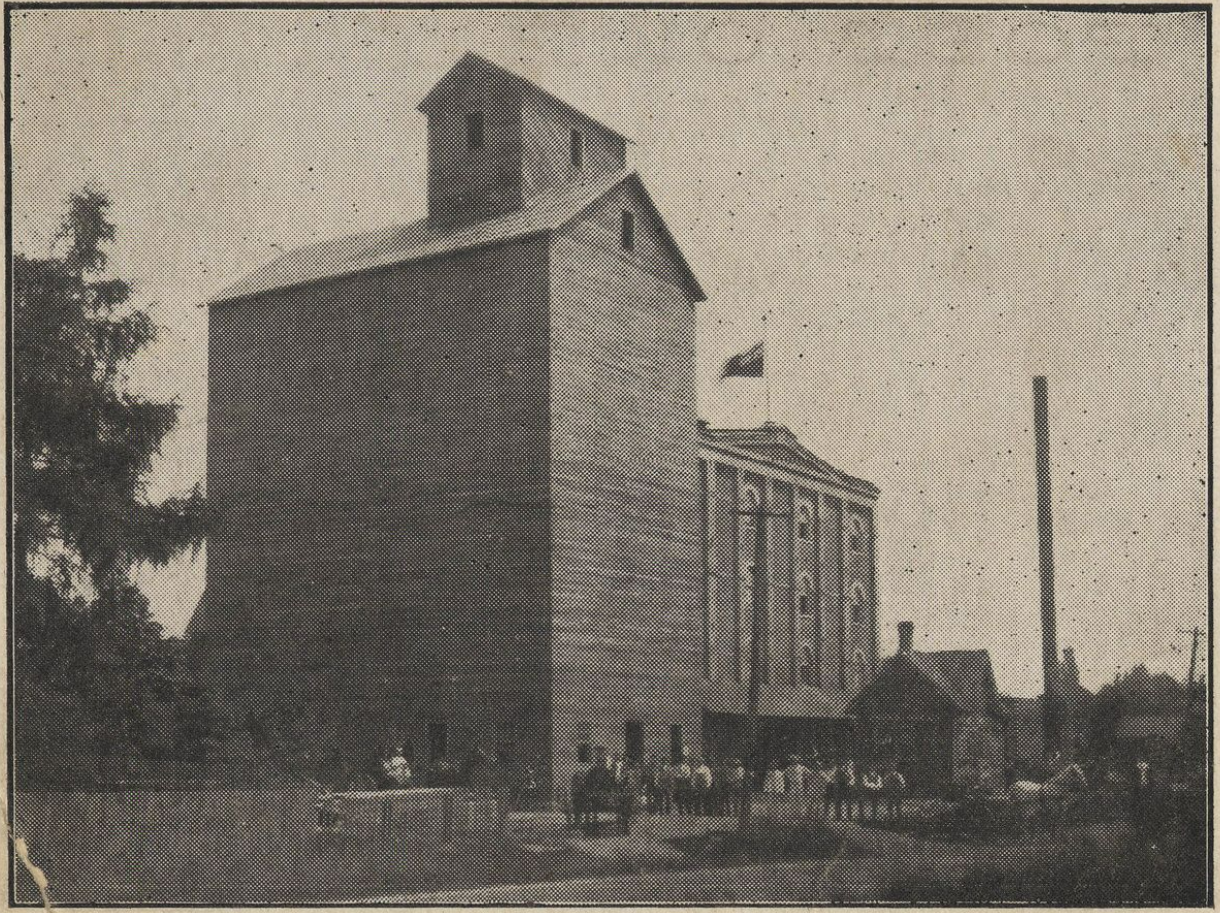
Spink's Mill in 1906

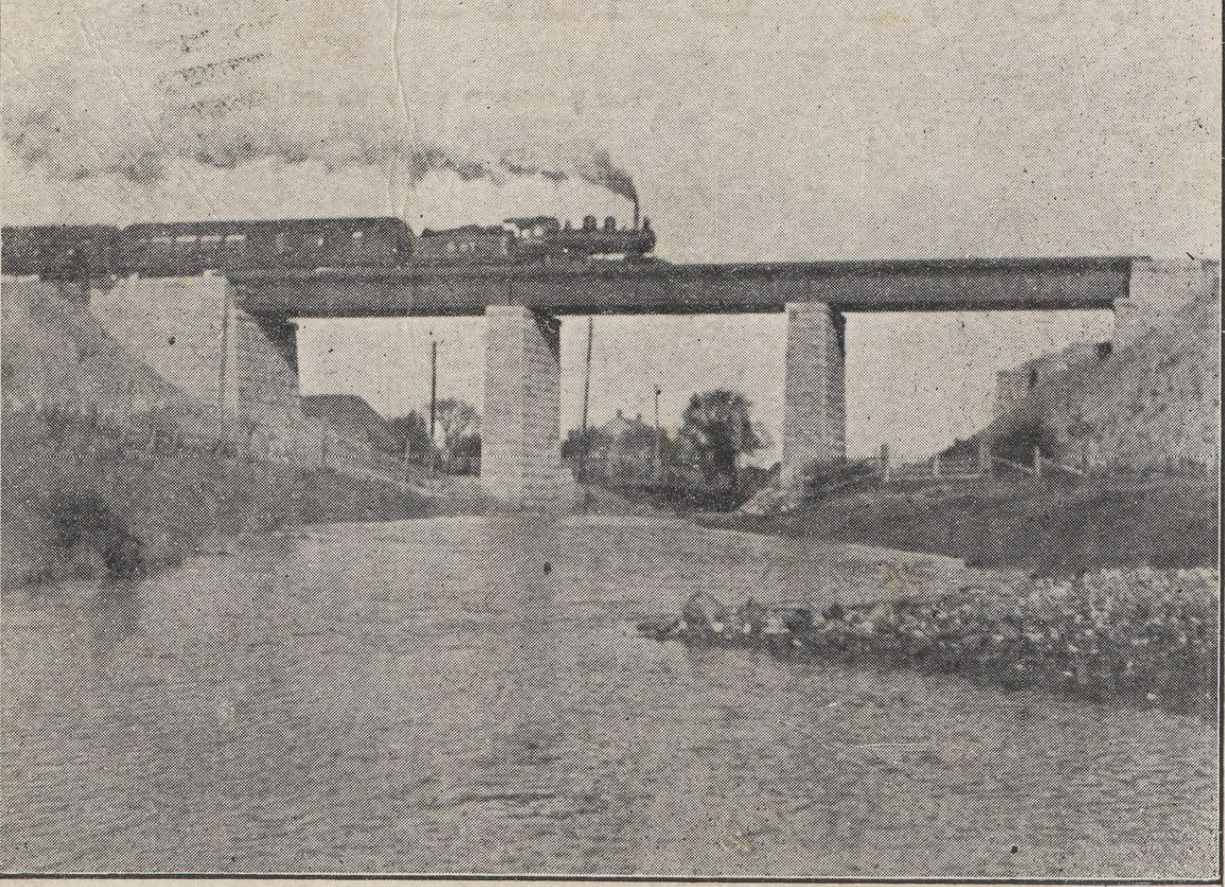
Grand Trunk Railway bridge on Duffins Creek, 1908

In 1810, Timothy Rogers built saw and grist mills on the banks of the Duffins Creek, around 5 km north of Lake Ontario. The War of 1812 increased military traffic on the Kingston Road, resulting in a better-maintained road, which in turn increased passenger traffic and benefited the local businesses, particularly the inn keepers.

In 1820 Alexander Wood of Toronto built the Elmdale grist mill at the north-east corner of Church Street and Highway 401, where the Church of Jesus Christ of Latter-day Saints was later built. The lumber from the local mills supported the shipbuilding industry at the mouth of the Rouge River.

As the area's population increased, several other businesses sprang up. In 1814 the Post family built the Post Inn (also called Post Tavern) at what is now 365 Kingston Road East, near the intersection of Carruthers Creek and Kingston Road. The inn served as a home for the family, and also operated as a stage station, providing service for stagecoach drivers, passengers, and horses traveling along the Kingston Road. It shut down after the Grand Trunk Railway reached Pickering in 1856, rendering its services obsolete. Other taverns, such as those of Noadiah Woodruff and Samuel Munger, existed nearby in what is now the city of Pickering.

After 1830 an economic expansion of the timber industry in southern Ontario led to the establishment of several sawmills in the area. Subsequently, many immigrants from Ireland, Scotland, and England arrived in the area.

In the mid-19th century the village of Audley developed around what is now the intersection of Audley Road and Taunton Road in northern Ajax. Originally known as Brown's Corners after the owner of a local hotel, it gained importance as a stopover for farmers traveling to the port of Whitby. Besides the hotel and the farms, the village had several other small businesses, a school, a church, and a post office.

By 1861 more than 60% of the original forest in the Pickering Township had been logged, most of it in the southern part. The area south of 5th Concession Line (now Concession Road 5), along the Duffins Creek, had 12 saw mills, 6 grist mills, and one tannery. A smaller number of industries also existed along the Carruthers Creek; the largest of these was along the 3rd Concession Line near the Audley village.

The new residents brought large portions of land under agriculture. The farming was diversified in its initial years, but subsequently became grain-dominated, with wheat, oats, and barley as the major crops. This shift was driven by demand for wheat from Toronto, the demand for wheat from Britain during the Crimean War (1854–1856), and the demand for barley and wheat from the United States.

In 1875 John L. Spink established Pickering Township's largest and most successful grist mill, at what is now the intersection of Kingston Road and Notion Road in Ajax, the site of Moodie's Motor Inn motel. The mill changed owner multiple times, before being destroyed by a fire in 1934.

In the later decades of the 19th century, a fall in the demand for wheat led to economic decline in what is now Ajax, and the Pickering Township in general. The local industry promoted modernization of agriculture and a return to diversified farming involving both grain and non-grain crops. However, the economic decline continued, and the Pickering Township lost over 40% of its population in the second half of the 19th century. An economic depression in the last decade of the century resulted in the closure of several mills and small businesses. The village of Audley was especially affected by the depression.

== Early 20th century ==
The early years of the 20th century saw growth in diversified agriculture driven by demand from Toronto, while other industries such as lumber continued to decline. The major crops in present-day Ajax were grains, silage corn, potatoes, peas, turnips, and hay. The major farm animals were poultry, swine, sheep, and cattle (both beef and dairy). Local farms supplied milk to the Brown's Cheese Factory in the northern part of present-day Ajax, as well as to creameries in Whitby, Brooklin, Hampton and Toronto. The area also produced fruits, the most common of which were raspberries, cherry, pear, plum and apple. The major apple cultivars included Baldwin, Blenheim Orange, Gravenstein, King, Northern Spy, Red Astrachan, Russett, Rhode Island Greening, Snow, Tolman Sweet, Wagener and Wealthy.

Stonehooking was common during the early 20th century: local farmers used stones from the beaches for repairing the local roads, and outsider schooners arrived to mine the beach gravel and cobble for use in Toronto and other areas.

Commercial fishermen operated at the shore of Lake Ontario, while the residents fished the Duffins Creek and the Carruthers Creek. Atlantic salmon was once common in the local streams, but damming and other human activities had wiped it out in the 19th century. In the early 20th century, northern pike was common in the marshes; whitefish, herring, and trout were common in Lake Ontario. The locals also hunted waterfowl and trapped muskrat in wetlands.

During 1910–1912, Toronto Eastern Railway laid out track from Port Hope in the east to Church Street of Pickering Village in the west. However, the negotiations to bring the track to Toronto failed, and the entire project was halted at the beginning of the World War I in 1914. The laid out rails were lifted and shipped to France, and the project was completely abandoned in the 1920s. In 1921, the Kingston Road was paved. Collacut Coach Lines of Pickering and Del-Ray Coach Lines of Oshawa operated buses along Kingston Road, connecting Pickering Village to Toronto.

In 1926, James Tuckett of Toronto bought lakeshore land west of Carruthers Creek, starting the development of the Pickering Beach community (the local beach is now called Paradise Beach). Initially a holiday cottage community, it gradually developed into a permanent settlement, with its own school, church, fire station, and Ratepayers' Association. Cottage communities also developed along the Squires Beach in the west (now south of the Duffin Creek Water Pollution Control Plant in Pickering), and Ontoro Beach in the east (now lakeside houses along Ontoro Boulevard in Ajax). In the late 1920s, the permanent population of what later became the town of Ajax was probably less than 200 people, but increased significantly during the summer months when Toronto residents occupied the cottages.

== DIL munitions plant and WHL housing ==
Farmland expropriated for the DIL munitions plant, 1939

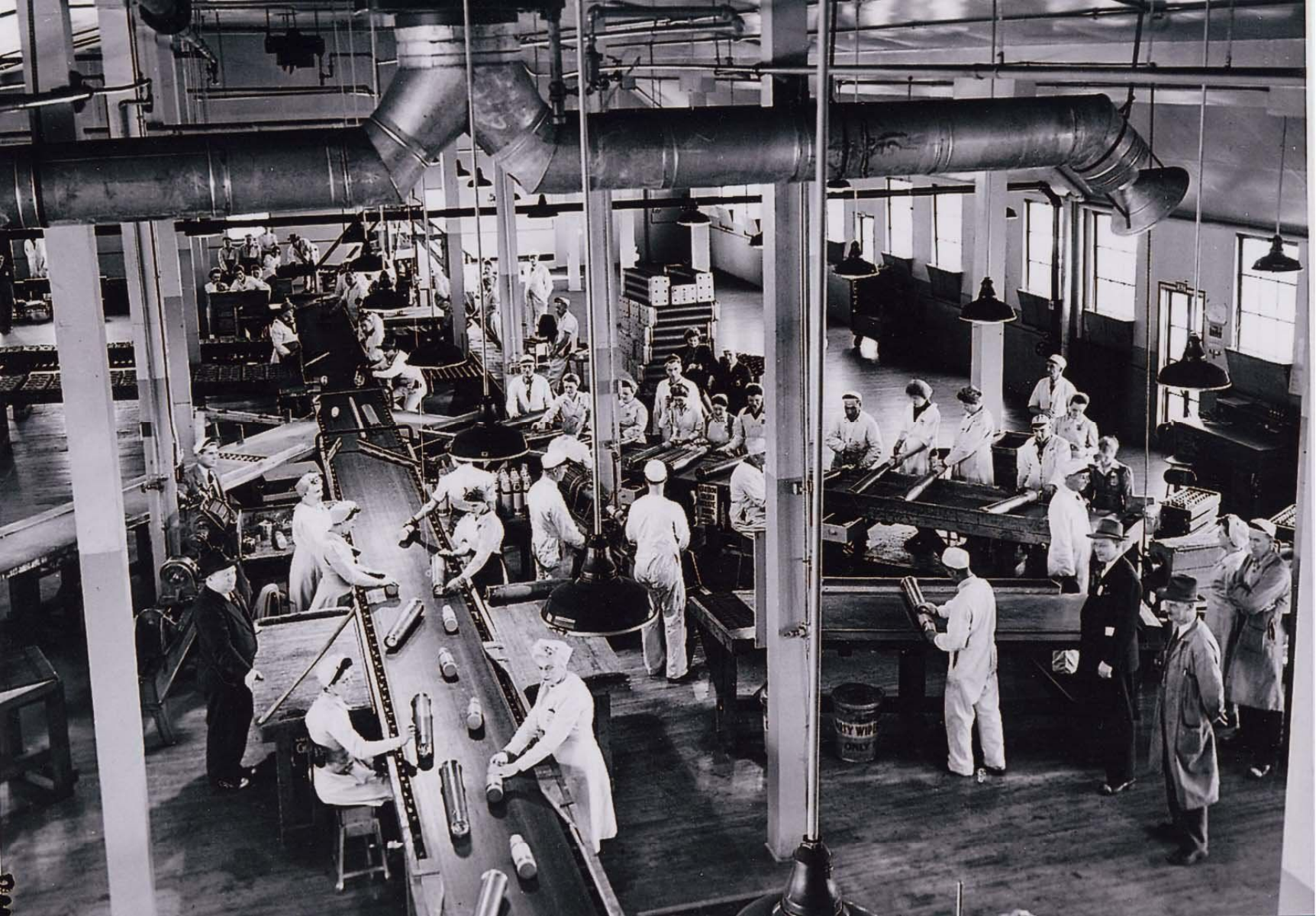
Workers assemble anti-aircraft shells at the DIL plant

Shortly after Canada entered the World War II in 1939, the Government of Canada built a shell-filling and assembly plant on expropriated farmland in what is now southern part of Ajax. The 2,846-acre site was bounded by Duffins Creek in the west, Pickering Beach Road in the east, a line running just north of and parallel to Highway 401 in the north, and Lake Ontario in the south.

The government-owned plant, known as DIL Pickering Works, was operated by Defence Industries Limited (DIL). By the end of June 1941, its Cap & Det Line was in production, and by the end of 1941, the major plant buildings were ready, complete with electrical, water and sewer lines. The site had a water treatment plant, a sewage treatment plant, a steam plant, and a transportation department.

There was a shortage of male workers because many men were engaged in the war or war-related industries. Initially, DIL procured most of its workers from the General Motors plant at Oshawa, but these were not sufficient to run the plant at its full capacity. So, DIL hired women including those mass-recruited from outside Ontario, based on the National Selection Service registry that maintained lists of potential labour pools. Soon, the women workers vastly outnumbered male workers at the DIL plant. At its peak, the plant employed 9,000 workers, and produced over 40 million rounds of shells.

The DIL compound gradually evolved into a self-contained community. By December 1941, the Pickering Village post office was unable to handle the post for the growing DIL community. The government decided to set up a new post office within DIL premises, which required a name for the place. In a contest held by DIL, the plant's assistant safety director Frank Holroyd suggested the name "Ajax", in honour of the British warship HMS Ajax which took part in the Battle of the River Plate of 1939.

The community had separate residences for male and female workers, with facilities such as a commissary, two cafeterias, a barbershop, a beauty shop, and laundry facilities. Wartime Housing Limited (WHL), a crown corporation, built 600 pre-fabricated houses and rented them to workers with families. DIL also built a hotel called Arbor Lodge, five detached houses, and three apartment blocks for its management and other senior employees.

The site had a post office, a fire department, a library, a Bank of Commerce branch, a hospital, a school, a church, a grocery store, and local transit. The Ajax Recreation Centre ("Rec Hall"), which included a 14-lane bowling alley, hosted several events including movie screenings, dance, music, drama, other stage shows, amateur hours, beauty contests (Miss Ajax), and sports events. Ajax Community Centre, a family-oriented recreation centre, hosted activities such as film nights, dances, and church services. Several social groups existed in Ajax, including the Ajax Kinsmen Club, which had the highest membership of any Canadian Kinsmen club in 1945.

Although the DIL site was owned by the federal government, it was within the boundaries of the Pickering Township, and did not have any distinct municipal status. The Township, along with the Ontario County, was responsible for municipal services (e.g. snow plowing) and social welfare in Ajax. However, the residents of Ajax referred to their community as a "village", and DIL's newsletter The Commando mentioned Ajax, not Pickering, as the place of its publication.

Production at DIL started slowing down in the winter of 1944, as the Allied victory in the World War II seemed assured and the demand for shells declined. In the summer of 1945, all production lines were abandoned, and most of the workers were dismissed. Some workers were retained until 1946, for tasks such as destroying the buildings contaminated by explosives.

== Post-war uses of the DIL site ==
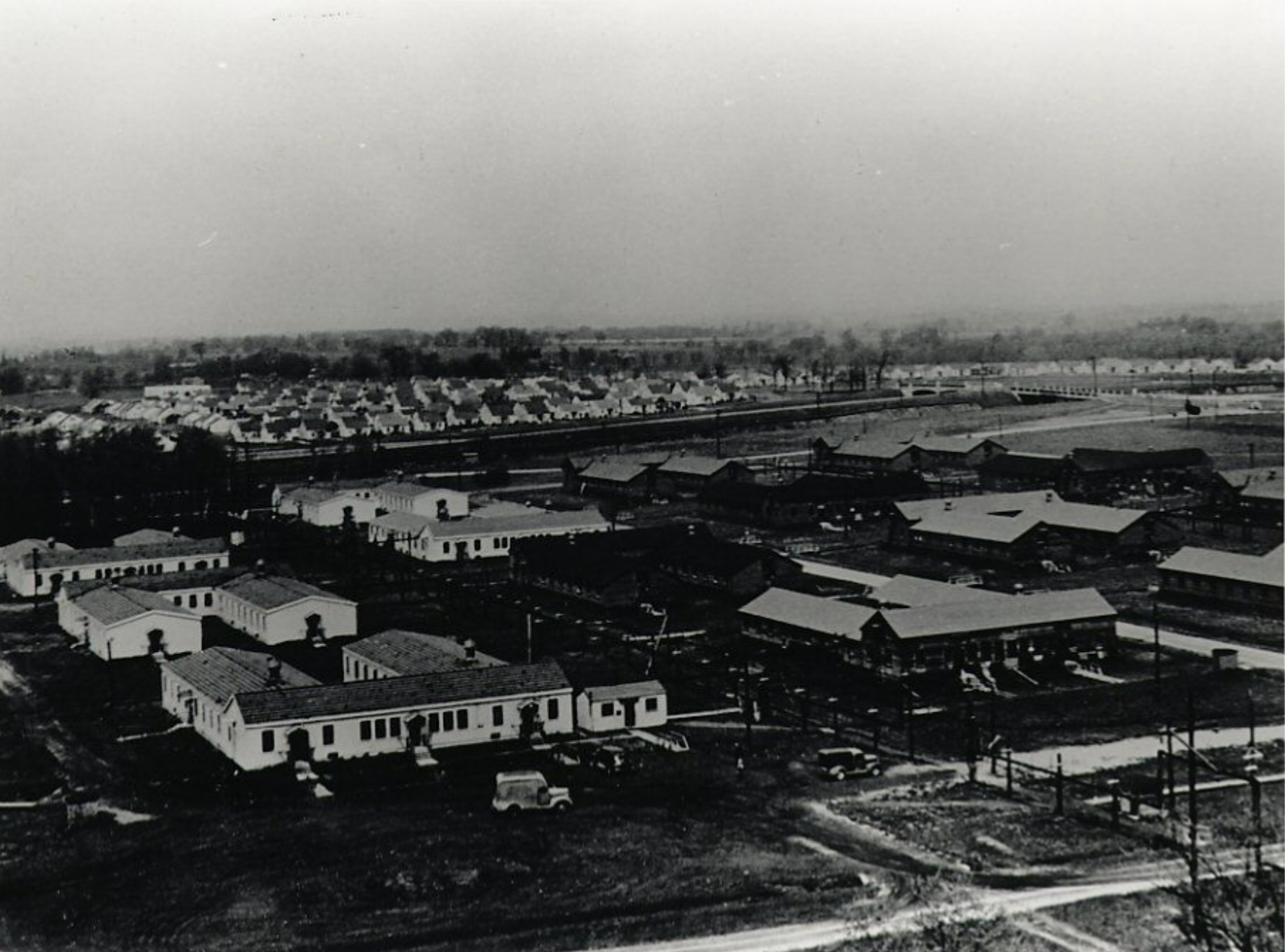
University of Toronto Ajax Division

Towards the end of the war, Ajax became a warehousing location for the War Assets Corporation, which was responsible for disposing of the government-owned surplus material and property from World War II. A War Surplus sales outlet was established at the site to dispose of the production equipment and other fixtures.

In 1945, Prime Minister William Lyon Mackenzie King decided to give the former DIL site to the Royal Canadian Air Force (RCAF) for storing surplus planes, but unaware of this, the Minister of Reconstruction C. D. Howe promised the site to the University of Toronto. To avoid unemployment among the war veterans returning from Europe, the Government had announced a plan to pay for their education, and the university's downtown Toronto campus had been unable to accommodate the increasing number of engineering students. After some discussions in late 1945, the university received the site, and set up its Ajax Division there, with support from the federal and the provincial governments. From January 1946 to April 1949, around 6,000 students, both veterans and non-veterans, attended classes at the Ajax campus. The federal government later offered to sell the site to the university for cheap, but the university declined, having built several new facilities in downtown Toronto by the end of the 1940s.

During 1949–1953, the government used the former women's residences at the DIL site as a holding camp for refugees from post-war European countries, such as Yugoslavia. Typically, men arrived at the camp first, and were enrolled in classes to learn English. Their wives and children followed them several months later; the women were not enrolled in the classes, and were expected to care for the children. Families were provided placement assistance, and moved out of the camp as they found accommodation outside. The "DP Camp" (Displaced Persons Camp), as it was called, closed in April 1953. The families that had not been able to find any other accommodation were relocated to other places.

== CMHC ==
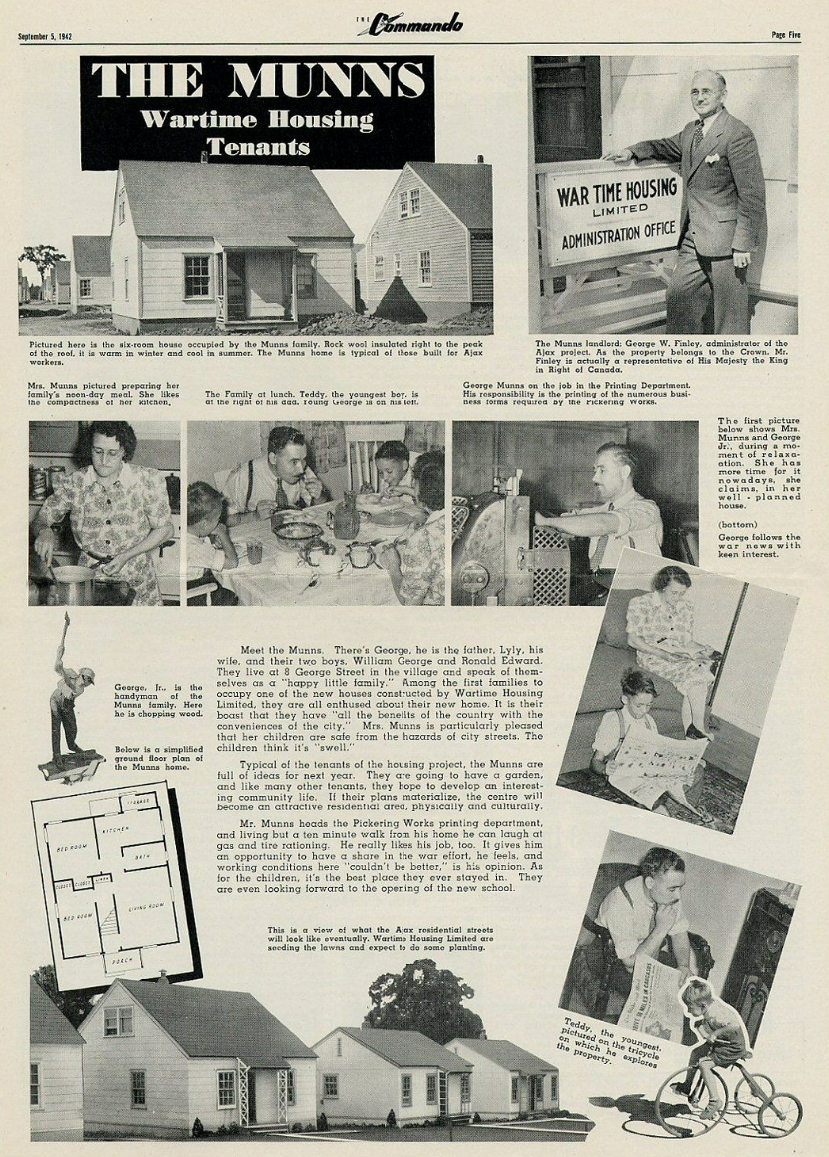
The Commando features tenants of WHL-built houses that were sold to tenants after the closure of the DIL plant in 1945

Most of the DIL workers left the town when their jobs ended, but several decided to remain in Ajax. Around 600 renting families lived in houses that were built to last for five years. When a federal official came to Ajax and talked about tearing the houses down, the residents protested. Some residents went to Queen's Park in Toronto to petition the government. During 1945–1951, many of the residents lived in uncertainty, as there were talks of closing down the community, and predictions that the community would turn into a ghost town or farming land.

The government ultimately bowed to public pressure, acknowledging the demands of the residents, and the need for housing from the incoming married University students. As part of a policy to minimize its intervention in the housing market, the government decided to liquidate WHL. The tenants of the WHL-built houses received the first opportunity to buy the houses in which they were living, with 10% down payment and a 25-year mortgage. The house prices ranged between $2,500 and $3,300. Many renters accepted the offer, and became homeowners. The buyers were given the option of having a permanent masonry foundation or a basement installed. For the basement, the buyer had to pay an additional cost, which could be negotiated directly with the contractor. Most residents opted for a basement.

In 1948, while the Ajax Division was still holding classes, the government had turned over the DIL property from WHL to Central Mortgage and Housing Corporation (CMHC), another crown corporation. CMHC's mandate was to develop Ajax into a planned industrial town. CMHC assigned the responsibility to George Finley, its housing manager in Ajax. Finley established an engineering office, headed by Ted Grierson.

By this time, the residents of the WHL-built houses had been frustrated with what they perceived as the federal agencies' lack of accountability. They had formed a committee to approach their local Member of Parliament, W. E. N. Sinclair, but Sinclair died in 1947 before he could take any action. The Ontario County Clerk M. Manning had petitioned Prime Minister William Lyon Mackenzie King, describing the frustration of the residents.

Meanwhile, Finley focused on population growth by creating new housing subdivisions. For each parcel of land to be designated as a subdivision, he ensured the availability of water distribution, sewage, electricity, and roads. As soon as this was done, he awarded contracts for construction of the houses. The first subdivision included Kings Crescent, Burcher Road, Exeter Street, and Wishbone Crescent. The houses there, built during 1947–1948, were like the ones built during the war, but featured improved design and better quality. The next housing sites were located along the Admiral Road, Woodhouse Crescent, Parry Road, Roosevelt Avenue, and Rideout Street.

For constitutional and financial reasons, CMHC did not want to get involved in running a municipality, and started negotiations with provincial and local political bodies to grant Ajax a municipal status. Meanwhile, the Township of Pickering and the Ontario County demanded that federal agencies reimburse them for the services rendered to Ajax during wartime. The contemporary Ontario law did not allow municipalities to negotiate financial matters directly with the federal government or federal agencies. The CMHC eventually paid $24,000 to the Township and the county.

CMHC planned an 18,000 sq. ft. shopping center on the west side of Harwood Avenue, between Station Street in north and Hunt Street in south. Member of Parliament Walter C. Thomson announced the plan in a press release, and the $187,630 construction contract was awarded to Moir Construction company of St. Catharines in September 1950. The contractor was expected to begin the work in two weeks and complete it in six months. However, a severe scarcity of steel and other metals delayed the construction. The production of these metals had been directed to military supplies during the wartime, and there was a rapid increase in their demand for civilian uses after the war, especially from the automobile sector. In a September 1951 letter to S. A. Gitterman, CMHC's Chief, Architectural Division, Finley requested the authorization to buy steel at a premium of about $100 per ton. He estimated that CMHC was losing over $2,000 per month in revenue because of the delay, and expressed fear that they may lose their most important tenant – the Hudson's Bay Company. The shopping center officially opened on 22 August 1952.

== Improvement district ==
At the beginning of 1950 many residents of Ajax sought local government, but the federal Government of Canada effectively held the municipal power in Ajax. The Government, through CMHC, owned the DIL site and all the WHL-built houses that had not been sold to former tenants. The Government also owned all the services in the area, including the water pumping plant, the sewage system, the underground water and sewage pipes, and the steam plant.

For a community to get municipal status, the contemporary Ontario Municipal Act required an application by a group of at least 30 adult male British subjects from a population of at least 50 persons. Herb Hunter, a former DIL manager, organized such a group, and presented a petition to the Department of Municipal Affairs of the Ontario Government on 9 November 1950. Accordingly, Ajax was designated as an "improvement district", the first step towards a full municipal status, effective 1 November 1950. Called "Corporation of the Improvement District of Ajax", the community was deemed a "township municipality" for all purposes of the Ontario Municipal Act. The Ajax Improvement District had a population of 5,124 persons.

Unlike the residents of a full municipality, the residents of an Improvement District did not have the right to elect their local administration. Instead, the Lieutenant Governor appointed a three-member board of trustees to the Corporation of the Improvement District of Ajax, which administered the community. The three board members were Benjamin de Forest Bayly (chairman), John Mills (Vice-chairman), and William Ridewout. Bayly, better known as Pat Bayly, was an electrical engineer who had worked at Camp X, had taught at the University of Toronto, and had founded the local electronics firm Bayly Engineering Limited. John Mills was a former worker at DIL and a reporter for the Oshawa Times Gazette, while William Rideout was a CMHC employee.

Unlike other municipalities that had evolved gradually, Ajax did not have any by-laws or staff. The Board met for the first time on 4 December 1950. Their first by-law was to appoint Ray Mark as the Secretary-Treasurer, tasked with carrying out general office activities necessary to administer the Improvement District. In January 1951, Mark was replaced by experienced Bolton Falby. In August 1952, Bayly resigned and was replaced by Robert F. Hunt, a manager of the local firm Dowty Equipment Canada.

The Board enacted several by-laws, including for:

- appointment of other officials such as auditor, solicitor, and medical officer (1951)
- borrowing money from bank for development (1951)
- purchase of power from Ontario Hydro (1951)
- arrangement with Ontario Provincial Police to police the area
- transfer of property from CMHC to the Improvement District (1951)
- taxation (1951)
- establishment of a fire brigade (1952)
- establishment a library (1952)
- selling water to Pickering Village (1953)
- providing fire protection Pickering Village (1953) etc.

Meanwhile, CMHC remained the major property owner, and George Finley served as an industrial advisor. Many industries across Ontario selected Ajax for expansion and relocation.

== Town ==
On 1 March 1953, the Pickering Village – then distinct from Ajax – achieved full municipal status, incorporating as the "Municipality of the Village of Pickering".

Meanwhile a group of Ajax residents formed the Ajax Citizens Association, which sought town status for Ajax. The movement was led by school-teacher William A. Parish, who later served as the town's mayor. The Association thanked the Improvement District Board members and officials for their service to Ajax, but emphasized that it was Canada's political tradition for people to be governed and taxed by elected representatives. It noted that Ajax was growing fast, and since 1951, its total assessment for taxation had risen from $3.2 million to $5.3 million. It argued that a three-member Board of Trustees was incapable of dealing with the municipal problems of such a fast-growing community. The Association also pointed out that the neighbouring Whitby and other towns of similar population had already been designated as towns.

On 12 August 1954 the Board passed by-law 110, requesting Ontario Municipal Board to declare Ajax a town. The by-law was approved by the Department of Municipal Affairs on 18 August 1954. The first town council members were elected on 11 December 1954, and assumed office on 1 January 1955. The first mayor was Benjamin de Forest (Pat) Bayly. Apart from the council, two other elected bodies participated in management of municipal affairs in Ajax: the Hydro Commission and the Public School Board. The town of Ajax continued to be part of Pickering High School District.

In 1954 Glenwood Construction designed, serviced, and built a new residential subdivision on Glenwood Terrace and a part of Kings Crescent. The project was managed by George A. Robinson, a Professional Engineer. Unlike the previously built houses in Ajax, these houses were made of brick and stone.

The development of Ajax progressed as a rapid pace, supported by the federal funds from CMHC. However, this led to a political controversy, as the citizens in neighbouring communities relied on municipal funds for local development, despite contributing to the federal taxes. As a result, the federal government led by Prime Minister John Diefenbaker decided to sell the CMHC-held land in Ajax. In 1957, all the undeveloped land held by CMHC in Ajax was sold to Principal Investments, a development firm operated by Lou and Ray Charles. However, CMHC still retained control over development. In May 1958, CMHC transferred their Ajax staff to their main offices in Toronto.

=== Industries ===
The Ajax Steam Plant, built in 1941, was the oldest industrial plant in Ajax. The steam heated the DIL buildings, and also contributed to production processes, such as liquefying the explosives. The plant was owned by several entities in succession, including DIL, CMHC, the municipality, and a private company called the Ajax Energy Corporation.

After the closure of DIL, several companies moved into the former DIL buildings. These included Bayly Engineering Limited (later AEG Sorting Systems), which moved from Camp X to Ajax in 1948, working on research, development, manufacture and repair of industrial equipment. The company provided equipment repair services to various clients, including the Department of Defence Production, Bell Canada, Honeywell, Canadian National Railway and Canadian Pacific Railway. It was also a manufacturing sub-contractor for the Armed forces, Dowty Canada and Pye Radio. The company's President Pat Bayly and Secretary-Treasurer Harry Smith later served as mayors of Ajax.

George Finley, the CMHC manager appointed for developing Ajax into an industrial town, initially focused on attracting British companies to Ajax, probably because of Canada's interaction with the British industry during the World War II. Several other Ajax-based firms were Canadian branches of British companies, including Pye Canada, Dowty Equipment of Canada, Fisher and Ludlow Canada, Slough Estates Canada and Aga Steel Radiators Canada.

Pye Canada (later acquired by Philips), a manufacturer of electronics equipment, was incorporated in 1947, and began production in 1949. Its clients included police forces, fire departments, taxicab companies, CBC, NBC, Canadian Armed Forces, and NASA. The company moved its main operation to North York in 1968, concerned about the dust from still-unpaved Hunt Street impairing the performance of sensitive inspection instruments.

Dowty Equipment (ultimately merged into Safran), which produced landing gears and hydraulic systems for aircraft, moved from Montreal to Ajax in May 1949, to be closer to its principal war-time customer A. V. Roe (which had purchased the Victory Aircraft plant in Malton). The car body manufacturing company Fisher and Ludlow moved their Long Branch operation to Ajax in 1950, but moved to Hamilton after a few years.

Slough Estates, a British property investment and development company, purchased a part of the DIL site in 1950, and built an industrial park with 18 rental buildings. The company promoted Ajax as prime industrial site, renting portions of its buildings to several small businesses. Slough Estates later built 15 more buildings at the site, before divesting its Ajax properties in 1986.

Several British employees of such firms eventually settled in Ajax. For example, Owen Ashley and Bill Laycock, employees of the knitting firm Canbri (a portmanteau of "Canada" and "Britain") became councillors in Ajax. Ashley served as councillor from 1957 to 1970, making him the longest-serving memberof Ajax Council at the time.

In 1951, the local companies and businesspeople, along with CMHC, formed the Ajax Industrial Association. The Association drew the town plan dividing the town area south of Highway 401 into two parts divided by the Harwood Ave: the eastern part was reserved for residential purposes, while the western part was reserved for the industry. The town followed this plan for several decades, with the exception of the residential area to the south of Dreyer Drive. One of the Association's aims was to ensure that the industry contributed 60% of the property taxes in Ajax, and accordingly, any new housing development was restricted in favour of industrial development until this condition was met.

Gradually, Canadian firms (mostly those from Ontario) and subsidiaries of US firms replaced the British firms in Ajax. In 1953, National Automotive Fibres-owned Canadian Automotive Trim Limited set up a plant in Ajax, producing interior trim for Ford, Chrysler, General Motors, American Motors and Studebaker. The ownership of the plant changed several times, and in 1965, Chrysler Canada purchased it. By 1976, the plant employed 1,900 people, and covered an area of 251,000 sq ft. In 1956, Dupont Canada began manufacturing various paint products at Ajax.

The 1994 Ajax Business Directory listed 201 industrial businesses, including 9 companies that had been in Ajax since the 1950s. These businesses employed a total of 6,989 persons, with only 23 of them employing more than 50 workers. The Directory listed 768 other businesses in the professional, commercial and retail categories: these employed a total of 6,026 persons. The 61 organizations in the institutional sector (comprising government, hospitals, social services, schools, and colleges) employed a total of 2,746 persons.

== Integration into the Durham Region ==
In the late 1960s, the Government of Ontario proposed the idea of Regional Municipalities, which would replace the County Councils, taking over the municipal and transportation services common to multiple towns and cities. Much of the former Ontario County, including Ajax, would become part of the Region of Durham. Negotiations between the Province and the Town began in 1969, when William LeGros became the Mayor of Ajax. The other municipal bodies of the former Ontario County were also involved in the discussion.

To gain or retain the municipal status, an area had to have a population of at least 8,000. Pickering Village fell considerably short of this threshold, and some of its residents resented the idea of losing their distinct identity. The Township of Pickering had a population of 17,000 although it was sparsely populated, while the more densely populated Town of Ajax had a population of 12,000.

Initially, the Township of Pickering proposed to join Metro Toronto, and encouraged Ajax to do the same. When the Province rejected this propsosal, Pickering proposed to amalgamate Ajax. Ajax, which risked losing its municipal status for being geographically too small, instead proposed to expand its boundaries, a move opposed by Pickering.

The 1971 Oshawa and Area Planning and Development Study (OAPADS) analyzed various options, including amalgamating Ajax with the Township of Pickering and/or with the Pickering Village. The OAPADS report, presented to the municipalities in 1973, supported the amalgamation of Ajax into Pickering. However, the Ajax Mayor Clark Mason engaged in extensive negotiations to retain his town as a distinct municipality, and presented his case before the Province. Eventually, the Province agreed with Ajax's proposal, on the basis that it resulted in a more even distribution of population, and that the town had a strong sense of community since the DIL days.

Accordingly, effective 1 January 1974 the boundaries of the town of Ajax were expanded to include several areas of the former Pickering Township, including Pickering Village, Pickering Beach, and Audley. The town's population doubled overnight as its boundaries now stretched to Concession Road 5 in the north, Lakeridge Road in the east, Lake Ontario in the south, and Duffins Creek in the west. To satisfy the residents of Pickering Village, the town of Ajax enacted strict development guidelines to ensure that the village retained its "distinctive flavour".

The newly formed Durham Region took over several services, including policing. The Ajax Fire Department remained under the town's municipal government.

In 1955, the population of Ajax was 5,689 in an area of 2,954 acres. By 1995, the population had crossed 55,000 and the area was 16,138 acres. Although initially planned as an industrial town, Ajax gradually became a dormitory community, as people employed in Toronto moved to suburban areas. In the 1960s, only 35% of the properties in the town were residential, the remaining being classified as industrial or commercial. By the 1990s, 90% of the properties in the town were residential.
