= Carruthers Creek =

Carruthers Creek may refer to:

- Carruthers Creek (Australia), a tributary of Blue Lake Creek, itself a tributary of Snowy River
- Carruthers Creek (Canada), a tributary of Lake Ontario
