= Ajax, Ontario =

Town in Ontario, Canada

Ajax
- Town (lower-tier)
- Town of Ajax
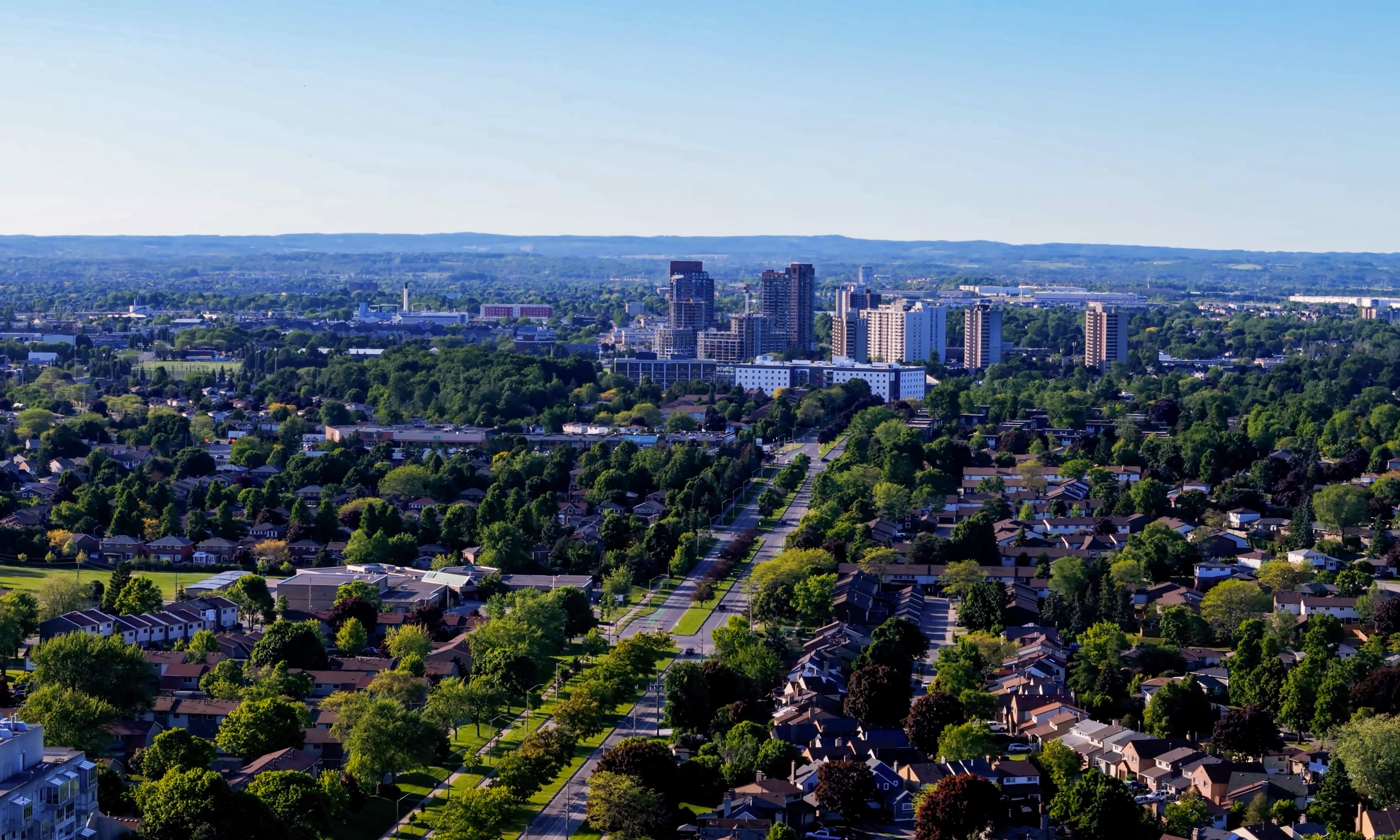
- Ajax in 2025

- Coat of arms Logo
- Motto: Town of Ajax by the Lake
- Interactive map of Ajax
- Location within Ontario Location within Canada
- Coordinates: 43°51′30″N 79°02′11″W
- Country: Canada
- Province: Ontario
- Regional Municipality: Durham
- Established: 1955

Government
  - Mayor: Marilyn Crawford
  - Governing body: Ajax Town Council
  - MP: Jennifer McKelvie (Ajax)
  - MPPs: Rob Cerjanec (Ajax)

Area
  - Land: 66.64 km^{2} (25.73 sq mi)
- Elevation: 90 m (300 ft)

Population (2021)
  - Total: 126,666 (Ranked 44th)
  - Density: 1,634.2/km^{2} (4,233/sq mi)
- Demonym: Ajacian
- Time zone: UTC−5 (EST)
  - Summer (DST): UTC−4 (EDT)
- Postal Code FSA: L1S, L1T, L1Z
- Area codes: 905, 289, 365, and 742
- Website: www.ajax.ca

Ajax (/ˈeɪdʒæks/; 2021 population: 126,666) is a waterfront town in Durham Region in Southern Ontario, Canada, located in the eastern part of the Greater Toronto Area.

The town is named for HMS Ajax, a Royal Navy cruiser that served in the Second World War. It is approximately 11 kilometres (7 mi) east of Toronto on the shores of Lake Ontario and is bordered by the City of Pickering to the west and north, and the Town of Whitby to the east.

== History ==
Indigenous peoples were active in the watersheds of the Duffins Creek and the Carruthers Creek since the Archaic period (7000–1000 BCE), although they did not build any major settlements in the area, presumably because of the poor navigability of these streams. In 1760, French Sulpician missionaries from Ganatsekwyagon reached the Duffins Creek area, but did not settle there.

After the British conquest of New France in 1760, the area became part of the Pickering Township. Mike Duffin, an Irish fur trader, is the earliest known European to have settled in the area, in the 1770s. The conversion of the main local trail into the Kingston Road in 1799 contributed to increased settlement in what is now Ajax. In the first half of the 19th century, the Pickering Village, now a neighbourhood in Ajax, evolved as the major population centre of the Township, supported by a timber and agricultural boom. In 1807, Timothy Rogers led Quaker families to settle in the area, and built saw and grist mills on the banks of the Duffins Creek. The War of 1812 increased military traffic on the Kingston Road, resulting in a better-maintained road, and leading to further development of the area.

In the mid-19th century, Audley, a smaller community, emerged as a stopover on the route to the port of Whitby. By the 20th century, much of the area of present-day Ajax had been converted into farmland. In 1926, James Tuckett of Toronto bought lakeshore farmland, and started the development of the Pickering Beach cottage community, which later became a permanent settlement.

After the start of the World War II in 1939, the Government of Canada expropriated most of the farmland in what is now southern part of Ajax, to establish the Defence Industries Limited Pickering Works munitions plant. Operated by Defence Industries Limited (DIL), the government-owned plant employed workers from different parts of Canada. The plant site, along with the residences and the facilities established for the workers, evolved into a self-contained community, whose residents called it a "village". As part of a contest, the DIL employee Frank Holroyd suggested the name "Ajax" for the community, in honour of the British warship HMS Ajax which had damaged German Panzerschiffe Admiral Graf Spee at the Battle of the River Plate in 1939.

After the plant shut down in 1945, the site was used as a war surplus warehouse and sales outlet, a University of Toronto campus (1946–1949), and a holding camp for war refugees from Europe (1949–1953). The government mandated the Canada Mortgage and Housing Corporation (CMHC) to develop the site and its surrounding area into a modern industrial town. George Finley, the CMHC manager of the area, planned new housing subdivisions, commercial centres, and industrial areas.

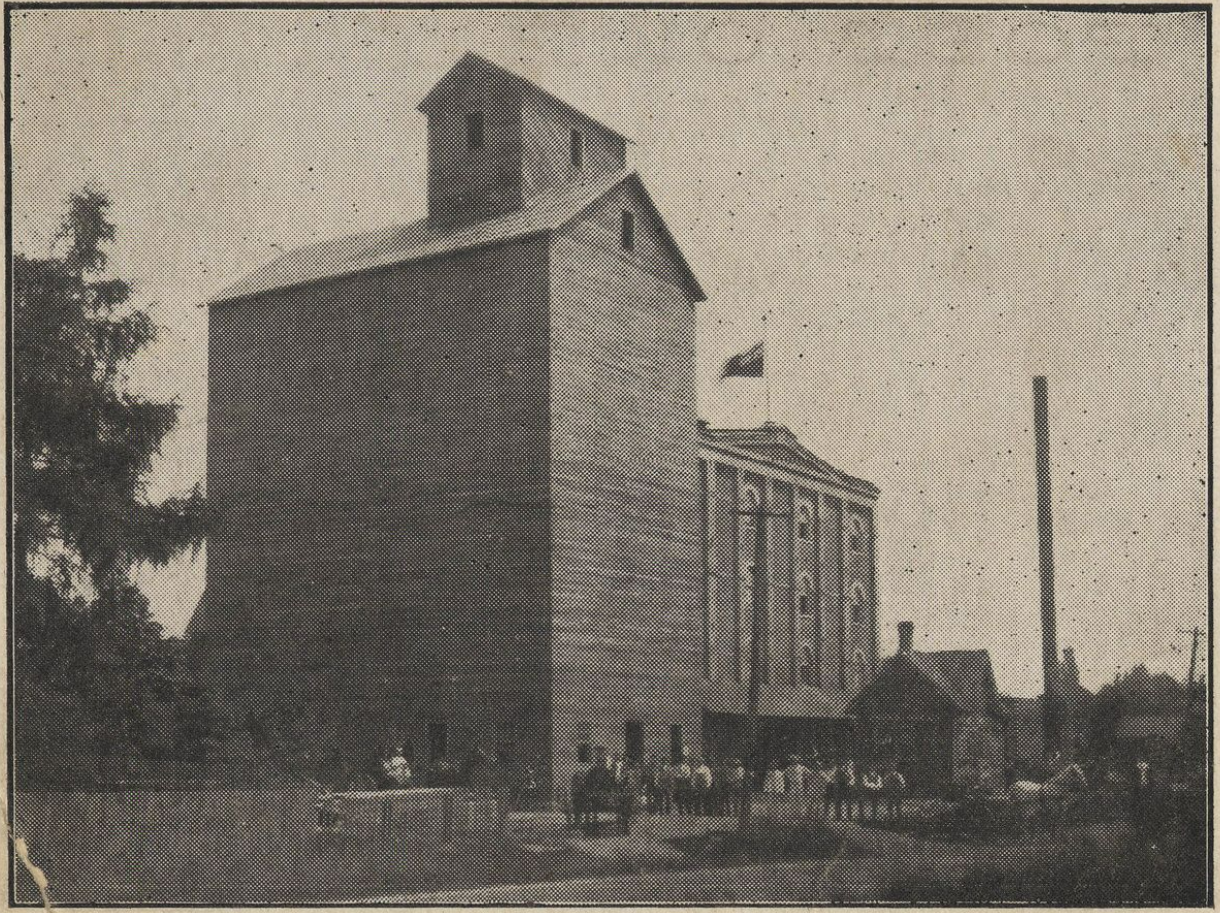
Spink's mill in Pickering Village (1906), now part of Ajax

Farmland expropriated for the DIL plant (1939)

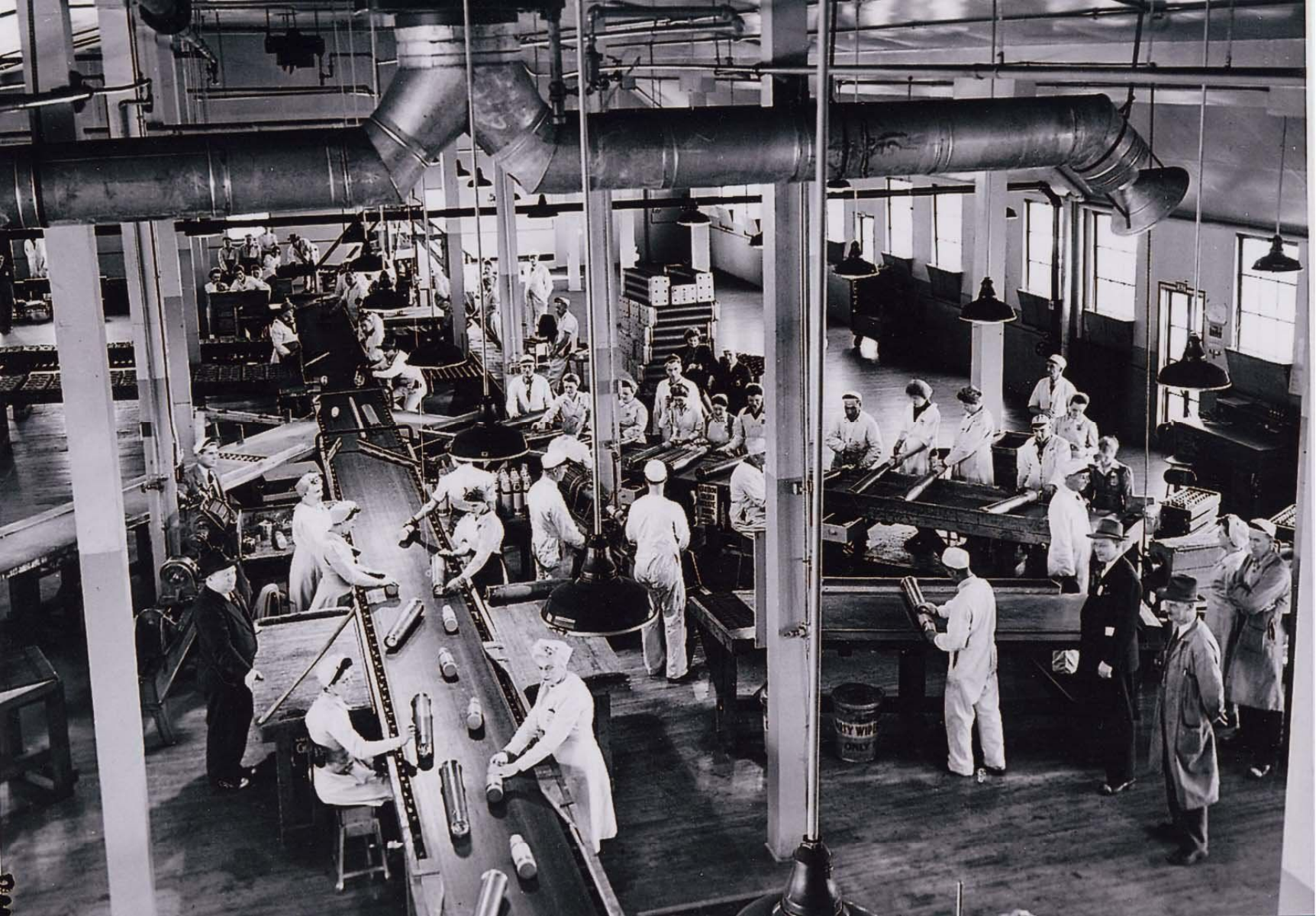
Workers assemble shells at the DIL plant (1940s)

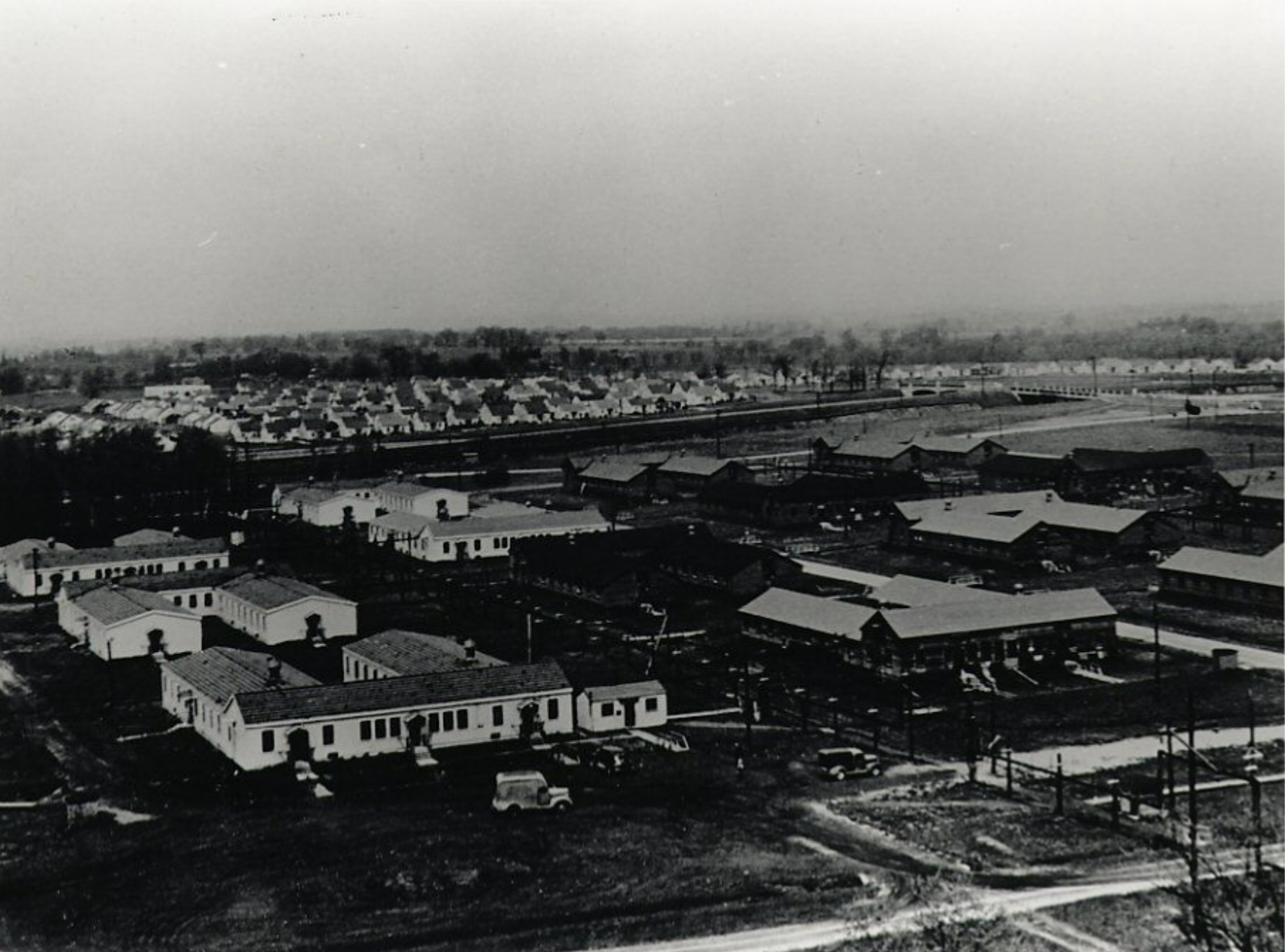
University of Toronto Ajax Division (1946-1949)

In 1950, Ajax was incorporated as an Improvement District, a form of local administration managed by the Lieutenant Governor's appointees. The Improvement District Board created the community's first by-laws and hired employees for the local administration. In August 1954, as a result of a campaign by the Ajax Citizens Association, the Ontario Municipal Board declared Ajax a town, granting it full municipal status. The first town council members were elected on 11 December 1954, and assumed office on 1 January 1955. The first mayor of the town was Benjamin de Forest Bayly, better known as Pat Bayly.

In the early 1970s, the Metropolitan Toronto and Region Conservation Authority (MTRCA) acquired much of the land along the lakeshore. In the Pickering Beach area, several homes, a church, and a school were demolished to make way for a parkland.

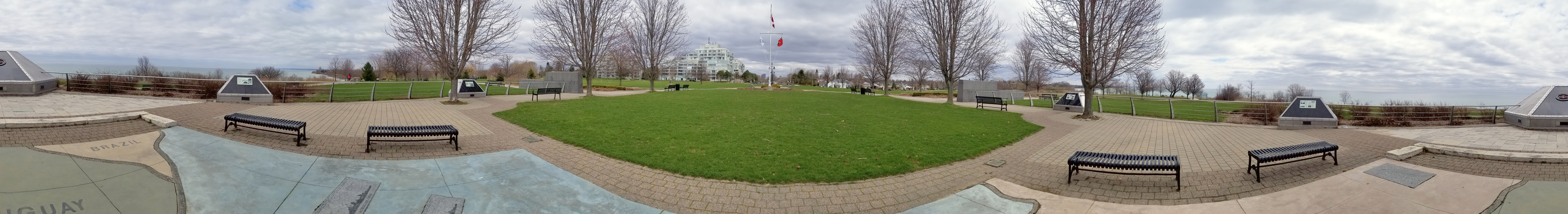
Waterfront Park

On 1 January 1974, Ajax became a part of the newly formed Regional Municipality of Durham, which manages functions common to multiple municipalities in the region. The boundaries of the town of Ajax were expanded to include several areas of the former Pickering Township, including Pickering Village, Pickering Beach, and Audley.

In 1995, Ajax was the first community along the 3,600-kilometre (2,200 mi) Great Lakes Waterfront Trail to erect a pedestrian-only asphalt waterfront trail. In 2018, the trail was named William Parish Waterfront Trail to honour the founding mayor of the town.

== Geography ==
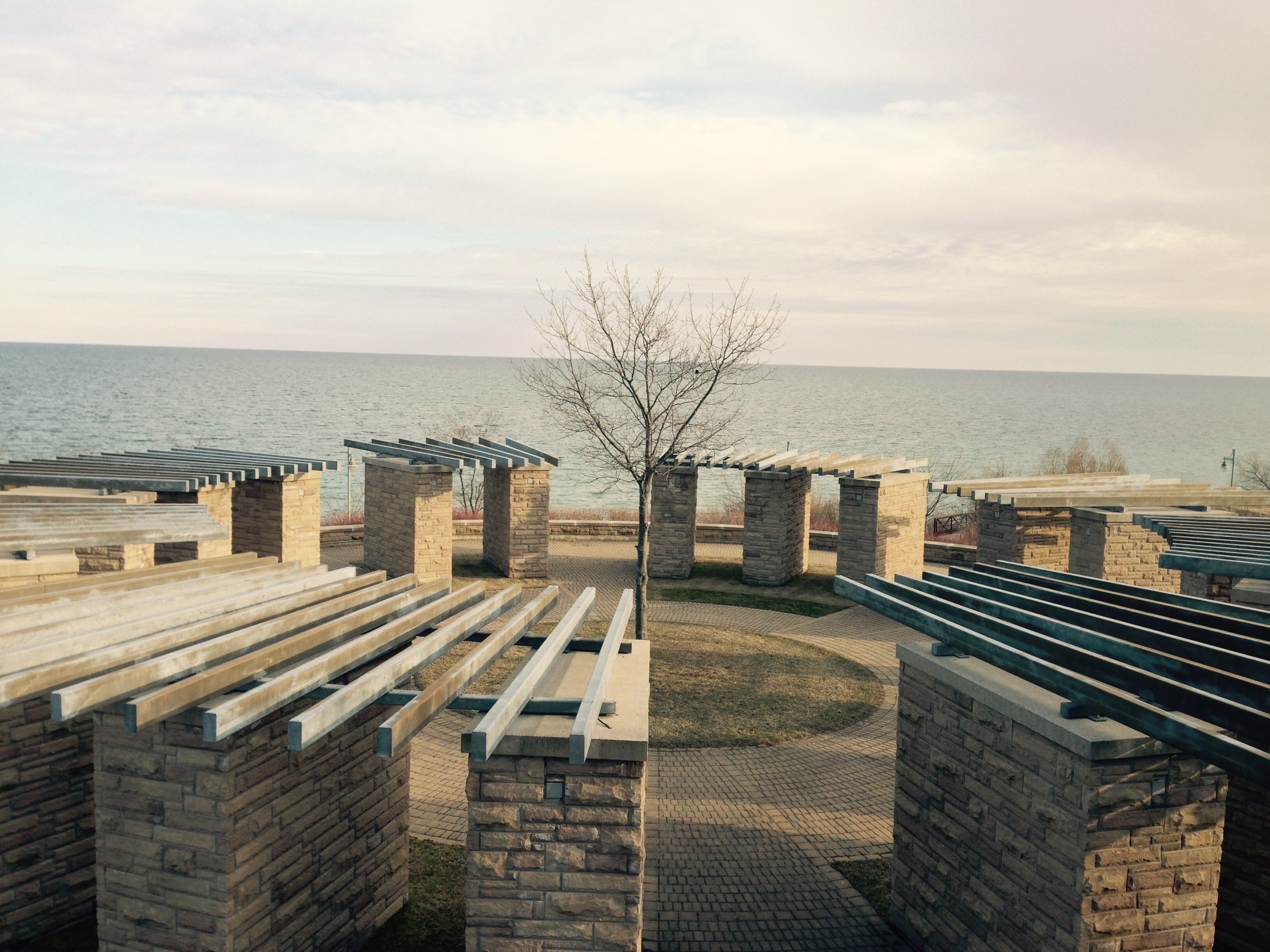
View of Lake Ontario as seen from Ajax Water Supply Plant located on Ajax Waterfront

Ajax is bordered to the west and north by the City of Pickering, to the east by the Town of Whitby and to the south by Lake Ontario.

== Neighbourhoods ==
The town is made up of the following neighbourhoods:

- Applecroft
- Audley North
- Audley Road Business Area
- Audley South
- Carruthers Creek
- Carruthers Creek Business Area
- Central Employment Area
- Clover Ridge
- Deer Creek
- Discovery Bay
- Downtown
- Duffins Bay
- Duffins Crossing
- Hermitage
- Lake Vista
- Lakeside
- Meadow Ridge
- Memorial Village
- Midtown
- Nottingham
- Pickering Beach
- Riverside
- Salem Business Area
- Salem Heights
- South Greenwood
- Southwood
- Village, better known as Pickering Village
- Westney Heights

=== Downtown Ajax ===
Ajax Council and a private developer entered into an agreement in 2012 for the purchase and sale of 9 acres (3.6 ha) of vacant town-owned land at the corner of Bayly Street and Harwood Avenue. Called "Pat Bayly Square", it will provide residential, retail and office space, as well as a civic square and civic facility. Pat Bayly Square opened in September 2018.

== Local government ==
Ajax is governed by an elected town Council consisting of a Mayor, and local Councillors representing each of the town's three wards. In addition, three Regional Councillors each represent a ward each. The Mayor and the Regional Councillors sit on both Ajax Town Council and Durham Region Council.

The members of the council elected in the 2022 municipal election are:

Mayor: Shaun Collier

Regional Councillors:

- Ward 1: Marilyn Crawford
- Ward 2: Sterling Lee
- Ward 3: Joanne Dies

Councillors:

- Ward 1: Rob Tyler-Morin
- Ward 2: Nancy Henry
- Ward 3: Lisa Bower

In the past, Council has sat for a three-year term, but the Ontario Legislature increased the length of municipal council terms in Ontario to four years, in 2006. In 2018, Ajax Council shifted from two regional councillors and four local councillors to three regional councillors and three local councillors.

== Demographics ==
Historical populations
Year	Pop.	±%
1956	5,683	—
1961	7,755	+36.5%
1971	12,515	+61.4%
1981	25,474	+103.5%
1986	36,550	+43.5%
1991	57,350	+56.9%
1996	64,430	+12.3%
2001	73,753	+14.5%
2006	90,167	+22.3%
2011	109,600	+21.6%
2016	119,677	+9.2%
2021	126,666	+5.8%

In the 2021 Census of Population conducted by Statistics Canada, Ajax had a population of 126,666 living in 39,488 of its 40,275 total private dwellings, a change of 5.8% from its 2016 population of 119,677. With a land area of 66.64 km^{2} (25.73 sq mi), it had a population density of 1,900.8/km^{2} (4,922.9/sq mi) in 2021.

According to the 2021 Census, the median age is 38.4 years, around 3 years less than the national average of 41.6 years; 18.8% of the population is under 15 years of age while 13.1% are 65 and over.

According to the 2016 Census, among those 25 to 64 years old, the highest levels of education are as follows: 66.6% of people have a post-secondary certificate, diploma, or degree, 25.3% have a high school diploma or equivalency certificate, and 8.2% have no certificate, diploma, or degree.

As of 2021, the median value of dwellings in Ajax is $850,000 compared to the provincial median value of $700,496, and the national figure of $472,000.

As of 2021, 92% of Ajax's residents are Canadian citizens, with 42% being immigrants. 8% of the population immigrated between 2011 and 2021. The main places of birth of the immigrant population are India (13%), Sri Lanka (11%), Jamaica (10%), Philippines (8%), Pakistan (8%), Guyana (6%), United Kingdom (5%), Trinidad and Tobago (4%), Afghanistan (4%), and China (3%). Among the 5010 recent immigrants, who immigrated between 2016 and 2021, 34% were from India.

=== Ethnicity ===
According to the 2021 Census, the main self-reported ethnic and cultural origins included English (12%), Indian (10%), Canadian (9%), Irish (9%), Scottish (9%), Jamaican (6%), Filipino (5%), Pakistani (5%), Sri Lankan (4%), Chinese (4%), and Tamil (4%). 65% of the town's population comprises visible minority, with the biggest of these groups being South Asian (26.2%), Black (16.8%), Filipino (5.3%), Chinese (3%), West Asian (3%), Arab (2%), and Latin American (1.3%). 3% of the people identify as belonging to multiple visible minority groups. Those with only indigenous ancestry make up 0.23% of the population, while those with mixed indigenous and non-indigenous ancestry make up 1.03% of the population. Ajax has the highest Black population percentage of any major Canadian municipality (population above 100,000).

Panethnic groups in the Town of Ajax (2001−2021)
Panethnic group	2021		2016		2011		2006		2001	
Panethnic group	Pop.	%	Pop.	%	Pop.	%	Pop.	%	Pop.	%
European (Note: Statistic includes all persons that did not make up part of a visible minority or an indigenous identity.)	43,415	34.39%	50,450	42.33%	58,145	53.24%	57,125	63.59%	55,280	75.19%
South Asian	33,055	26.18%	24,895	20.89%	15,025	13.76%	9,735	10.84%	4,035	5.49%
African	21,210	16.8%	19,860	16.66%	17,510	16.03%	11,680	13%	7,090	9.64%
Southeast Asian (Note: Statistic includes total responses of "Filipino" and "Southeast Asian" under visible minority section on census.)	7,495	5.94%	6,350	5.33%	5,465	5%	3,115	3.47%	1,525	2.07%
Middle Eastern (Note: Statistic includes total responses of "West Asian" and "Arab" under visible minority section on census.)	6,250	4.95%	4,880	4.09%	2,935	2.69%	1,855	2.06%	1,200	1.63%
East Asian (Note: Statistic includes total responses of "Chinese", "Korean", and "Japanese" under visible minority section on census.)	4,240	3.36%	3,790	3.18%	3,065	2.81%	2,430	2.7%	1,570	2.14%
Latin American	1,695	1.34%	1,670	1.4%	1,065	0.98%	705	0.78%	415	0.56%
Indigenous	1,270	1.01%	1,190	1%	1,080	0.99%	705	0.78%	370	0.5%
Other (Note: Statistic includes total responses of "Visible minority, n.i.e." and "Multiple visible minorities" under visible minority section on census.)	7,615	6.03%	6,095	5.11%	4,925	4.51%	2,485	2.77%	2,040	2.77%
Total responses	126,245	99.67%	119,180	99.58%	109,220	99.65%	89,835	99.63%	73,520	99.68%
Total population	126,666	100%	119,677	100%	109,600	100%	90,167	100%	73,753	100%

- Note: Totals greater than 100% due to multiple origin responses.

=== Religion ===
Religions in Ajax
Religion	Per cent
Christians	50.83%
No religious affiliation	20.77%
Muslims	14.08%
Hindus	11.62%
Others	2.7%
Distribution of religions (2021 Census)

According to the 2021 Census, the largest religion in Ajax is Christianity (50.83%), with Catholics making up the largest group (22.25%). The next most reported religions are Islam (14.08%) and Hinduism (11.62%). 20.77% of the population reported no religious affiliation.

=== Language ===
According to the 2021 census, English is the most commonly understood language in the town, with 97.97% of the people knowing it. It is also the most common mother tongue: 64.79% of the people consider English as their only mother tongue, plus 5.75% consider English and another language as their mother tongues. Other common languages include the following:

Mother tongue (2021 Census)
Language	Population	%
English (including multiple responses)	89180	70.55%
Tamil	6355	5.03%
Urdu	4620	3.65%
Tagalog (Filipino)	2840	2.25%
French (including multiple responses)	2340	1.85%
Dari	1910	1.51%
Arabic	1540	1.22%
Gujarati	1515	1.20%
Spanish	1300	1.03%
Mandarin	1280	1.01%
Punjabi	1220	0.97%
Bengali	1150	0.91%
Hindi	1020	0.81%
Yue (Cantonese)	1005	0.80%
Italian	690	0.55%

Knowledge of language (2021 Census)
Language	Population	%
English	123690	97.97%
French	9500	7.52%
Tamil	9145	7.24%
Urdu	8040	6.37%
Hindi	5725	4.53%
Tagalog (Filipino)	4350	3.45%
Punjabi	2860	2.27%
Dari	2665	2.11%
Arabic	2635	2.09%
Spanish	2315	1.83%
Gujarati	2130	1.69%
Mandarin	2030	1.61%
Bengali	1780	1.41%
Yue (Cantonese)	1295	1.03%
Italian	1070	0.85%

== Economy ==
In 1945, with the closing of D.I.L., there was no industry within the town, but in 1949, Dowty Aerospace started operations in Ajax. By 1969, major employers included Volkswagen Canada, DuPont, Paintplas, Ajax Textile, AEG Bayly Engineering and many others.

Shopping was virtually non-existent in the mid-1940s, but by 1970 major shopping centres such as Ajax Plaza, Harwood Place Mall and Clover Ridge Plaza were constructed. The 1980s saw an expansion of retail shopping malls to include Discovery Bay Plaza, Transit Square, Baywood Plaza, Westney Heights Plaza and most recently the Durham Centre at Harwood Avenue and Kingston Road.

The 1970s saw the beginning of many physical changes to the face of Ajax. New subdivisions spread over vacant land in central Ajax. The early 1980s brought extensive development to the southern part of Ajax with large, upscale housing units constructed along Lake Driveway.

The recession of the early 1980s did not stop residential development in Ajax. Westney Heights started north of Highway 2 and offered home buyers low interest rate mortgages while interest rates were then at an all-time high of 18% to 20%. Development north of Highway 2 stretched from Church Street in Pickering Village to Harwood Avenue, with the Millers Creek development south of the highway down to the edge of Highway 401.

=== Ajax Downs ===
Ajax Downs is a casino that is located on 50 Alexander's Crossing, near the intersection of Kingston Road and Audley Road. It has been controversial since the announcement of the Durham Live casino in 2018. The Ontario premier Doug Ford had promised to keep the Ajax Downs open after the completion of the casino. In 2022, The Durham Live casino was completed. Although it is referred to as the Pickering Casino, it lies on the border of the two small cities. This marks the first major casino operation in the Greater Toronto Area.

== Infrastructure ==
=== Health care ===
The Ajax and Pickering General Hospital first opened in 1954 with 38 adult and children's beds. It was expanded to 50 beds in 1958 and a major expansion to 127 beds took place in 1964. The emergency and outpatient services were expanded in 1975. The large growth of population in the Town has prompted a further expansion. Approval was granted in the fall of 1990 to further expand. In 1999, the Hospital merged with Centenary Health Centre in Scarborough to become part of the Rouge Valley Health System. Construction on a $60 million expansion began in 2007, although that has been marred by the highly controversial closure of the 3 West Mental Health ward in 2008, which was originally to be part of the expansion.

=== Emergency services ===
The Durham Regional Police police Ajax from a station in Pickering. Durham Region provides Ambulance/emergency medical services. Ajax Fire & Emergency Services provides firefighting services from three fire stations.

=== Transportation ===
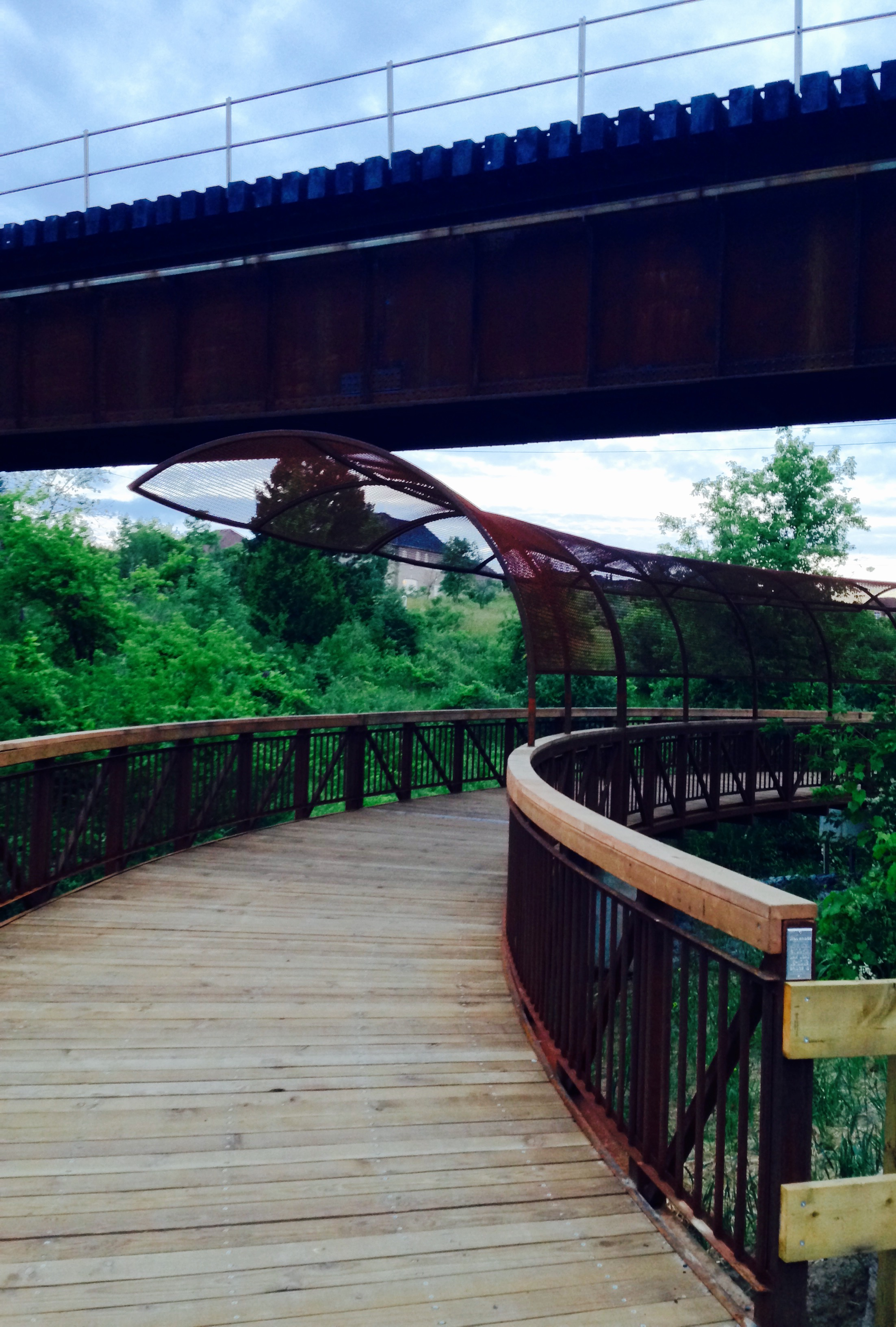
Multi-use trail over Caruthers Creek. The overhead bridge carries a Canadian Pacific rail line.

Ajax GO Station is served by GO Transit's Lakeshore East line, with service from Toronto and Oshawa.

In 1973, the Town of Ajax conducted a survey of potential transit ridership in Ajax. This led to the creation of Ajax Transit with bus service beginning in 1973 under a contract with Charterways Transportation Limited, which operated service using a fleet of school buses, with heaviest ridership between the Pickering Beach area and downtown Ajax.

In the late 1970s, the town brought the operations in house and began operations on the Elm, Duffins, and Beach routes, which exist to this day. In the early 1980s, the Harwood, Westney Heights, and Village routes began service. Service on the Puckrin route began in the late 1980s.

In 2001, Ajax Transit and the neighbouring Pickering Transit were amalgamated into the Ajax Pickering Transit Authority (APTA), which operated under the joint ownership and oversight of Ajax and Pickering.

In 2006, APTA was amalgamated into Durham Region Transit along with the other municipal transit services in Durham Region.

Road transportation in Ajax is dominated by Highway 401, which runs east–west through the town, dividing it in half. Access to Highway 401 both east and west is available via Westney Road and Salem Road. Only four streets allow transportation from the north end of town to the south end of town by crossing over or under Highway 401. These streets are (from west to east) Church Street, Westney Road, Harwood Avenue and Salem Road. Lakeridge Road crosses the highway, but it is traditionally held to be the border between the towns of Ajax and Whitby. Notable streets that run parallel to the highway are (from north to south) Taunton Road, Rossland Road, Kingston Road (Highway 2) and Bayly Street. At Salem Road is where Highway 401 narrows to three lanes each way, causing a severe traffic bottleneck eastbound during rush hours and special holidays due to increased travel to Ottawa and Montreal.

The closest international airport to Ajax is Toronto Pearson International Airport, located 50 kilometres to the west in Mississauga.

== Education ==
Ajax is served by the Durham District School Board and the Durham Catholic District School Board. There are five high schools and several elementary schools. Two of the high schools are Catholic schools: Notre Dame Catholic Secondary School and Archbishop Denis O'Connor Catholic High School. The other three are the public secondary schools: Ajax High School, J. Clarke Richardson Collegiate and Pickering High School.

== Culture ==
=== Music and dance ===
During 1955–1962, the Ajax Recreational Committee ran regular dances for the town's teenagers. The Saturday night dances, called "Ajax Teen Town", were held at the Ajax Community Centre, and were attended by as many as 500 teenagers at its peak. The Community Centre burnt down in 1960s, and the event attendance gradually declined, as music styles changed and as the members grew up.

For a short period beginning in the 1990s, Ajax became notable for its punk musicians, with the Maclean's magazine calling it the "punk-rock capital of Canada" in 2003. After the success of Sum 41, record labels began looking for upcoming artists at the local shows in the Durham region. Several other bands and artists from Ajax achieved popularity, including Closet Monster, Not by Choice, Matt Brann and Jesse Colburn (members of Avril Lavigne's back-up band). According to writer Alan Cross, punk became popular in Ajax as the local teens kept themselves busy with music, finding not much else to do in a small town. Chameleon Café (110 Dowty Road), an auto body garage converted into a music venue, became a popular spot for local bands during the mid-to-late 1990s, with hundreds of teens gathering there on weekends. According to producer Greig Nori, the popularity of Chameleon Café (which closed in 2001) and the proximity of Ajax to Toronto (where teens could attend major punk band concerts) helped the music scene in the town.

=== Public art ===
The Town of Ajax maintains a diverse collection of public art, monuments, and memorials, with a significant concentration of works by local sculptor Geordie Lishman. His installations in the town often utilize recycled industrial steel and kinetic elements, reflecting the region's natural and mechanical heritage:

- Ajax Elation: A large stainless steel fountain located in the reflecting pool at Ajax Town Hall, co-created with his father, Bill Lishman.
- Communitree (2012): A 5.5-metre steel sculpture at the McLean Community Centre. The piece features the "Running Man," a kinetic figure that rotates with the wind, symbolizing an active community.
- The Rock People (2013): A series of figurative sculptures at the Audley Recreation Centre. Created from steel mesh cages (gabions) filled with local river stone, the installation became a subject of national media discussion regarding the aesthetics of public art.
- Heritage Horse: A life-sized horse sculpture at the St. Francis Centre constructed from salvaged historical materials discovered during the building's restoration.
- The Running Man (Taunton & Salem): A standalone kinetic sculpture of a running figure located at the intersection of Taunton Road and Salem Road, serving as a landmark for the northern gateway of the town.

Other notable works in the city's collection include:

- Ron Baird sculpture: An abstract Corten steel piece commissioned in 1968 for the former Ajax Post Office, reflecting the town's naval heritage.
- The Storm (2014): An interactive installation at Lion's Point by Amanda Berry and Henry Kortekaas featuring a "lightning strike" design.
- Solar Sail: A functional solar collector and sculpture at the Ajax Operations Centre designed by Solera Sustainable Energies.
- Vasika mhuri: A Serpentine stone sculpture by Zimbabwean artist Passmore Mashaya located at the McLean Community Centre.
- Veterans' Point: A cultural landmark designed by Bruce Johnson built to resemble the bow of a ship, commemorating the town's namesake, HMS Ajax.

=== Sports ===
The members of the Ajax Aquatic Club, established in 1973, have included the Olympic medalists Anne Ottenbrite and Lori Melien. The Ajax Budokan Judo Club was also established in 1973, with 20 members, most of them high school students. Its members have included judokas Jessica Klimkait, Craig Weldon, Sandra Greaves, and Kevin Doherty. The Ajax Acros Gymnastic Club was formed as a feeder club in 1974, with 60 children. Lori Strong, who has won multiple medals at the Commonwealth Games, started her training at this club.

The Ajax-Pickering Rock (2003-2010) was a local box lacrosse team that played in the Ontario Lacrosse Association Senior "B" League during 2003–2010. In 2010, it was promoted to Senior "A" Major Series Lacrosse league, and played under the name Ajax Rock (2011-2012). The team faced challenges in attracting players and fan base because of competition from other teams in the Durham Region. In 2013, it moved from Ajax to the newly constructed Toronto Rock Athletic Centre (TRAC) in Oakville, and re-branded itself as Oakville Rock.

In 2022, the Ajax Pickering Minor Hockey Association was formed after the merger of the Ajax Minor Hockey (Ajax Knights), Pickering Minor Hockey (Pickering Panthers), and Ajax-Pickering Raiders; the team retains the name "Raiders". Ajax Spartans Minor Baseball Association (ASMBA) is a local minor league baseball team.

Ajax Wanderers, established in 1949, is the oldest rugby union club in Ontario. Its members have included Dave Moonlight of Whitby.

Other sports clubs in the town include the Ajax Soccer Club, Ajax United, Ajax-Pickering Dolphins (football), Ajax Pickering Ringette Association, Ajax Cricket Club, Ajax Scuba Club, and Ajax Skating Club. Ajax Ice Waves, a synchronized skating team of the Ajax Skating Club, won several local competitions in Ontario in the 2010s.

== Notable people and groups ==
- Isaiah Adams, NFL football player
- Toya Alexis, musician, Canadian Idol finalist
- Charlotte Arnold, actress
- Benjamin deForest Bayly, inventor
- Jeff Beukeboom, retired NHL player
- Ruby Bhatia, Indian-Canadian VJ, television show host, and actress
- Ryan Blanchet, touring car racer
- Boi-1da, hip hop producer
- Matt Brann, musician
- Brendan Canning, musician
- Munro Chambers, actor
- Nichelle Prince, women's soccer player and Olympian
- Candace Chapman, women's soccer player and Olympian
- Closet Monster, punk rock band
- Christian Corbet, painter, sculptor and forensic artist
- Derek Cornelius, professional soccer player
- Joe Dickson, MPP and owner of Dickson Printing
- Janet Ecker, former Ontario Minister of Finance
- Akeem Foster, CFL football player
- Keith Godding, CFL football player
- Glenn Healy, former NHL goaltender
- Kyle Johnson, professional basketball player and Olympian; grew up in Ajax
- The Johnstones, ska band
- Sara Kaljuvee, Olympic bronze medalist for Rugby Sevens
- Kaza Kajami-Keane, professional basketball player, and Canadian national team player
- Rabindranath Maharaj, novelist
- Connor McMichael, NHL player
- Nam Nguyen, national champion figure skater
- Not by Choice, punk rock band
- Emmett O'Connor, professional association football (soccer) player
- Phan Thi Kim Phuc, subject of a famous photo from the Vietnam War
- Matt Poitras, NHL player
- Mike Ross, broadcaster, actor, PA announcer Toronto Maple Leafs
- John Saunders, sports journalist for ESPN and ABC
- Corey Sevier, actor
- Ken Shaw, CTV Toronto news anchor
- Nathan Shepherd, NFL football player
- Devin Shore, current NHL forward
- Rene Soetens, former Progressive Conservative MP
- Sum 41, punk rock band
- T-Minus, hip hop and R&B producer
- Jessica Tyler, actress
- Nigel Wilson, retired MLB player

== See also ==
- List of municipalities in Ontario
