= Christian Cardell Corbet =

Canadian sculptor and philanthropist (born 1966)

Christian Corbet FRSA
- Corbet in 2026
- Born: Christian Cardell Corbet; 31 January 1966 (age 60); Pickering Beach, Ontario, Canada
- Education: University of Guelph
- Known for: Sculptor; Portrait Sculptor; Forensic Sculptor
- Notable work: Tutankhamun; HRH Prince Philip; Robert the Bruce
- Movement: Contemporary Art

Christian Corbet (born 1966) is a Canadian artist and philanthropist. He is a Sculptor in Residence for the Royal Canadian Navy.

== Personal life ==
Christian Corbet descends from a Guernsey family whose commercial interests included quarrying, horticulture and property investment, and whose members became noted for philanthropy and royal patronage.

Christian Corbet identifies as a member of the LGBTQ+ community.

== Early career ==
Corbet's earliest inspiration came from Lake Ontario near where he was born and studies signage from his paternal grandfather.

He later moved to British Columbia where he was befriended by Jack Shadbolt and Bill Reid. Later he moved to the UK where he practiced watercolours. Disappointed with the results he destroyed most of them.

Corbet's first commission was a portrait of Queen Elizabeth the Queen Mother in 1995 which he was asked to present at Clarence House.

Corbet painted a portrait of Princess Diana which was presented to Princes William and Harry in 1997.

== Mentoring ==
Corbet's first known mentor was Canadian sculptor Elizabeth Bradford Holbook.

== Founding Institutions ==
In 1996 Corbet founded the Canadian Portrait Academy(CPA), Canada's first professional organization dedicated to the fine art of portraiture.

In 2010 Corbet founded the first legally registered LGBTQ+ organization Corner Brook Pride Inc. in Newfoundland and Labrador, Canada.

In 2026 Corbet founded and was appointed Founding Director of the Canadian Centre for Sculpture (CCS), an independent national initiative devoted to the study, preservation, documentation, and public understanding of sculpture in Canada.

== Activism ==
Corbet is an LGBTQ+ activist.

== Subjects ==
In 2000, Corbet sculpted Dame Jane Goodall from life in Toronto, Ontario, Canada.

In 2010, Corbet sculpted an official portrait bust of Vice Admiral Charles Kingsmill and in 2011 Chief Petty Officer Max Bernays for the Royal Canadian Navy, among numerous others.

In 2011, the National Museum of Ireland acquired a forensic facial reconstruction of an Irish-born Canadian soldier from World War I named Thomas Lawless, also known as the Avion I Project as sculpted by Christian Corbet.

In 2013, a bust by Corbet of Prince Philip, Duke of Edinburgh was unveiled. The sculpture was created in Buckingham Palace and was commissioned by The Royal Canadian Regiment.

By 2016, Corbet had completed portrait busts of Vice-Admiral Ralph Hennessy, Commander Adelaide Sinclair and Midshipman William Palmer for the Royal Canadian Navy.

In 2016, Corbet created a bronze portrait bust of Canadian aviation pioneer J. A. D. McCurdy.

In 2016, Corbet created a portrait bust of Newfoundland Royal Naval Reservist Able Seaman Leander Green, DSM, as part of his series honouring figures from Canadian naval history. Two editions were produced: one is displayed at the Naval Museum of Halifax, while the other is permanently displayed at the town hall in Sunnyside, Newfoundland and Labrador.

In 2017, Corbet created a sculpture of Robert the Bruce, based on casts of the skull. Andrew Nelson of the University of Western Ontario determined that King Robert the Bruce did not die of leprosy. The sculpture is in the permanent collection of Stirling Smith Art Gallery and Museum.

In September 2018, Corbet's portrait sculpture of neuropsychologist Brenda Milner was unveiled during the Brenda Milner Centennial Symposium at the Montreal Neurological Institute and Hospital.

In 2018, Corbet sculpted from life sittings in the Supreme Court of Canada The Right Honourable Beverley McLachlin.

In 2018, Corbet along with Vice Admiral Mark Norman of the Royal Canadian Navy unveiled the official portrait of Able Seaman Leander Greene at the Canadian War Museum.

Corbet has also sculpted a portrait of General Romeo Dallaire and former Chief of Defence Staff Jonathan Vance.

In 2020, Corbet sculpted a portrait of Queen Elizabeth II for the Platinum Jubilee.

In 2020, Corbet made preliminary sketches and maquette miniature of a proposed public statue of HM Queen Elizabeth II which was announced in the House of Lords.

In 2022, Corbet was commissioned to sculpt an authorized forensic facial reconstruction of King Tutankhamun for the 100th anniversary of the discovery of his tomb. Corbet and the sculpture were featured in a 2-hour movie on PBS Tutankhamun Allies and Enemies which aired in 2022.

In 2022, Corbet produced and directed a memorial tribute to the late Queen Elizabeth II for the Royal Canadian Navy.

In 2026, Corbet sculpted and donated a portrait sculpture of HM King Charles III, commissioned by the Royal Canadian Navy to commemorate the King's coronation, to the Government of Ontario Art Collection.

== Forensic facial reconstruction ==
=== Sulman Mummy Project ===
Corbet participated in the Sulman Mummy Project, an interdisciplinary study of a Ptolemaic-period Egyptian mummy in the collection of the Chatham–Kent Museum. Researchers used computed tomography to create a three-dimensional digital model of the skull, from which physical models were produced using 3D printing and stereolithography. Corbet used one of the printed skull models to create the project's forensic facial reconstruction. The collaboration involved specialists from the University of Western Ontario, St. Joseph's Health Care, the Robarts Research Institute and the National Research Council of Canada.

=== Avion 1 Project ===
Corbet later contributed to the Avion I Project, a multidisciplinary effort to identify one of two Canadian First World War soldiers whose remains were discovered near Avion, France, in 2003. Andrew Nelson of the University of Western Ontario and Steve Kruithof of the National Research Council Canada produced a computer model and three-dimensional print of the skull, which Corbet used to create a forensic facial reconstruction. The reconstruction formed one component of an investigation that combined historical, genealogical, archaeological and anthropological research with DNA testing and stable-isotope analysis. In January 2011, the remains were identified as those of Private Thomas Lawless, an Irish-born member of the 49th Battalion, Canadian Expeditionary Force, and he was buried at La Chaudière Military Cemetery that March. The Canadian War Museum catalogues a bust by Corbet under the title Avion 1, while the National Museum of Ireland later acquired a facial reconstruction of Lawless; Veterans Affairs Canada records the latter work as being displayed at the museum.

=== Reconstruction of Sir Isaac Brock ===
Corbet's forensic reconstruction of Major-General Isaac Brock began with the profile pastel attributed to Dutch artist Gerrit Schipper, now in the permanent collection of Guernsey Museums. The portrait has been dated to between late May 1809 and mid-July 1810 and is considered the only known surviving likeness of the adult Brock produced during his lifetime. Historian Guy St-Denis concluded that Schipper probably established its profile with a physiognotrace, making the outline a mechanically traced record of the sitter's proportions rather than a wholly freehand interpretation. Brock University Archives holds eight graphite studies from Corbet's project. Its catalogue describes a sequence comprising a tracing of the Schipper portrait, lateral and frontal comparisons with an average male cranium, adjusted cranial overlays and a final proposed cranial form incorporating changes to the mandible. Brock University exhibited the reconstruction in October 2011, describing it as an examination based on forensic data and reporting that Corbet was then developing a sculptural bust for Guernsey. The archival description links the studies to a sculpted medallion created for the 2012 bicentenary of Brock's death, while the Canadian Heraldic Authority also identifies Brock as the subject of a forensic facial-reconstruction sculpture by Corbet.

=== King Robert the Bruce reconstruction ===
In 2016, Corbet produced a forensic facial reconstruction of Robert the Bruce using a plaster cast of the skull attributed to the Scottish king. The cast had been held by Bruce's descendants for nearly two centuries and was believed by the family to be the original made after the remains were uncovered at Dunfermline Abbey in 1818; the project proceeded with the permission of Andrew Bruce, 11th Earl of Elgin. Corbet collaborated with Western University physical anthropologist Andrew Nelson, French paleopathologist Olivier Dutour and forensic-dentistry specialist Stan Kogon. The group cited the preserved anterior nasal spine and the absence of bone “pencilling” in images of a surviving metatarsal as evidence inconsistent with leprosy. Corbet subsequently reconstructed the face muscle by muscle over a latex-resin copy of the cast, depicting Bruce without lesions associated with the disease. The finished bronze portrait was unveiled by Lord Charles Bruce at the Stirling Smith Art Gallery and Museum on 23 March 2017 and entered the museum's collection. Historic Environment Scotland noted in 2024 that the team's supporting paper remained unpublished and continued to characterize the question of Bruce's illness as unresolved.

=== Tutankhamun reconstruction ===
In 2022, Corbet collaborated with Western University bioarchaeologist Andrew Nelson and Cairo University radiologist Sahar Saleem on a facial reconstruction of the Egyptian pharaoh Tutankhamun. The work was commissioned for the two-part PBS documentary Tutankhamun: Allies & Enemies, produced to mark the centenary of the discovery of Tutankhamun's tomb. Saleem's involvement enabled the researchers to obtain permission from Egyptian authorities to examine computed-tomography data. Nelson used the scans and Dragonfly three-dimensional bioimaging software to construct a virtual model of the skull, from which a three-dimensional print was produced for Corbet.

Working from the printed skull in his Sackville studio, Corbet applied tissue-depth markers based on modern Egyptian anatomical data and reconstructed the face's musculature layer by layer. He first produced a forensic version without ears or a facial expression, followed by an artistic version informed by Egyptology and ancient Egyptian art and completed with a khepresh crown. The reconstruction and its development were presented in Episode 2 of the documentary, broadcast on 23 November 2022. PBS also released a dedicated segment filmed in Corbet's studio describing the forensic and artistic stages of the work.

== Awards ==
In 2012, Corbet was awarded the Queen Elizabeth II Diamond Jubilee Medal.

In 2012, Corbet was granted a coat of arms (armorial bearings) and a badge by the Canadian Government.

In 2013 the Priaulx Library in Guernsey, Channel Islands awarded Corbet "Lifetime Membership" as a generous friend of the institution.

In 2022, Corbet was awarded the Queen Elizabeth II Platinum Jubilee Medal by Lt. Governor of New Brunswick Brenda Murphey.

In 2025, Corbet was awarded the King Charles III Coronation Medal.

== Professional Affiliations ==
Corbet is an elected member and holds the post nominals for the Canadian Portrait Academy (CPA), British Art Medal Society (BAMS), Federation of International Medalists (FIDEM), Canadian Centre for Sculpture (CCS), Fellow of the Royal Society of Arts (FRSA).

== Arms ==
Coat of arms of Christian Cardell Corbet

Notes
The arms of Christian Corbet consist of:
Motto
LE TEMPS-A-V’NI EST DANS LE PASSAI;
Badge
A lion’s face Argent irradiated erablé Gules;

== Books ==
Published memoir Brutal Youth-A Memoir in Poems in 2025 by Canadian Art Publications.

== Essays and Monographs ==
In 1997 Christian Corbet wrote his first essay and exhibition catalogue on British-born painter Elizabeth Wolff Smily titled "An Introduction to the Art of Elizabeth Smily". In 1998 he followed with a monograph on the same subject, "Elizabeth Smily – A 70 Year Retrospective".

In 2001 Corbet wrote on Canadian sculptor "Elizabeth Bradford Holbook-Seven Decades of Art.

Corbet wrote the official biographical essay on Swedish sculptor Carl Milles for the Encyclopedia of Sculpture published by Fitzroy and Deeboon, 2003.

Corbet further wrote in 2003 for the same encyclopedia on Carl Milles' Orpheum Fountain.

Interplay: Tensions and Parallels Between Sport and Art, 2005.

In 2009 Corbet published his first forensic facial recognition analysis titled "Denys Corbet Forensic Analysis".

== Collections ==
Corbet is represented in the permanent collection of the British Museum with a medallion of Queen Elizabeth the Queen Mother.

Corbet is represented in the permanent collection of the Canadian War Museum with a forensic facial reconstruction of WWI soldier Private Thomas Lawless.

Corbet is also represented with a bust of Pte Thomas Lawless in the National Museum of Ireland.

Corbet is collected in the permanent collection of Stirling Smith Art Gallery & Museum with a forensic facial reconstruction of King Robert the Bruce.

Corbet is represented in the Supreme Court of Canada with his portrait of sculptor Walter Allward.

Corbet is represented in the Halifax Naval Museum with several sculptures.

Corbet is also represented in the following other institutions: Imperial War Museum, Rijksmuseum, Fitzwilliam Museum, Kunsthistorisches Museum's Coin Cabinet, Royal Coin Cabinet of Sweden, and Guernsey Museum and Art Gallery.

=== GALLERY ===
Supreme Court of Canada
