= Tompkins King =

Apple cultivar

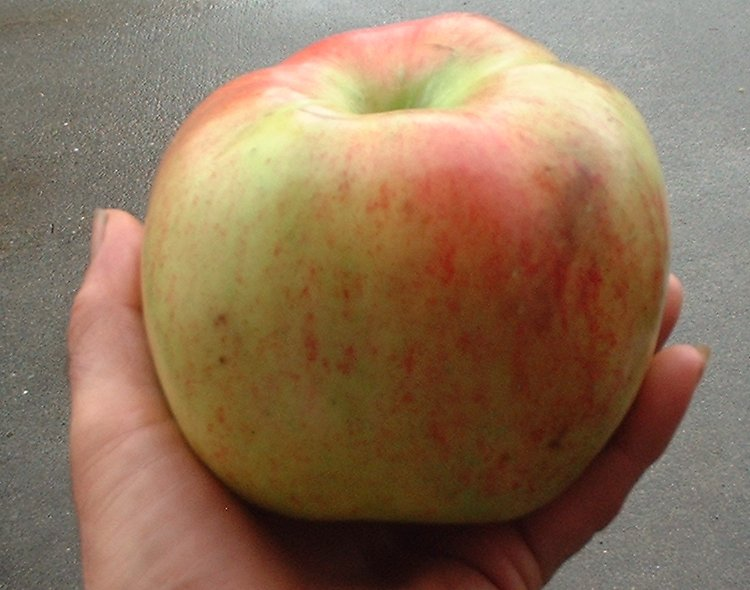
- Species: Malus pumila
- Cultivar: 'Tompkins King'
- Origin: New Jersey, U.S., before 1804

'Tompkins King' is a triploid cultivar of apple, also called 'King' or 'King of Tompkins County'. It was thought to have originated at Jacksonville in Tompkins County, New York, but Liberty Hyde Bailey investigated the tree there, and discovered that it was grafted. The cultivar was apparently brought from Warren County, New Jersey in 1804.

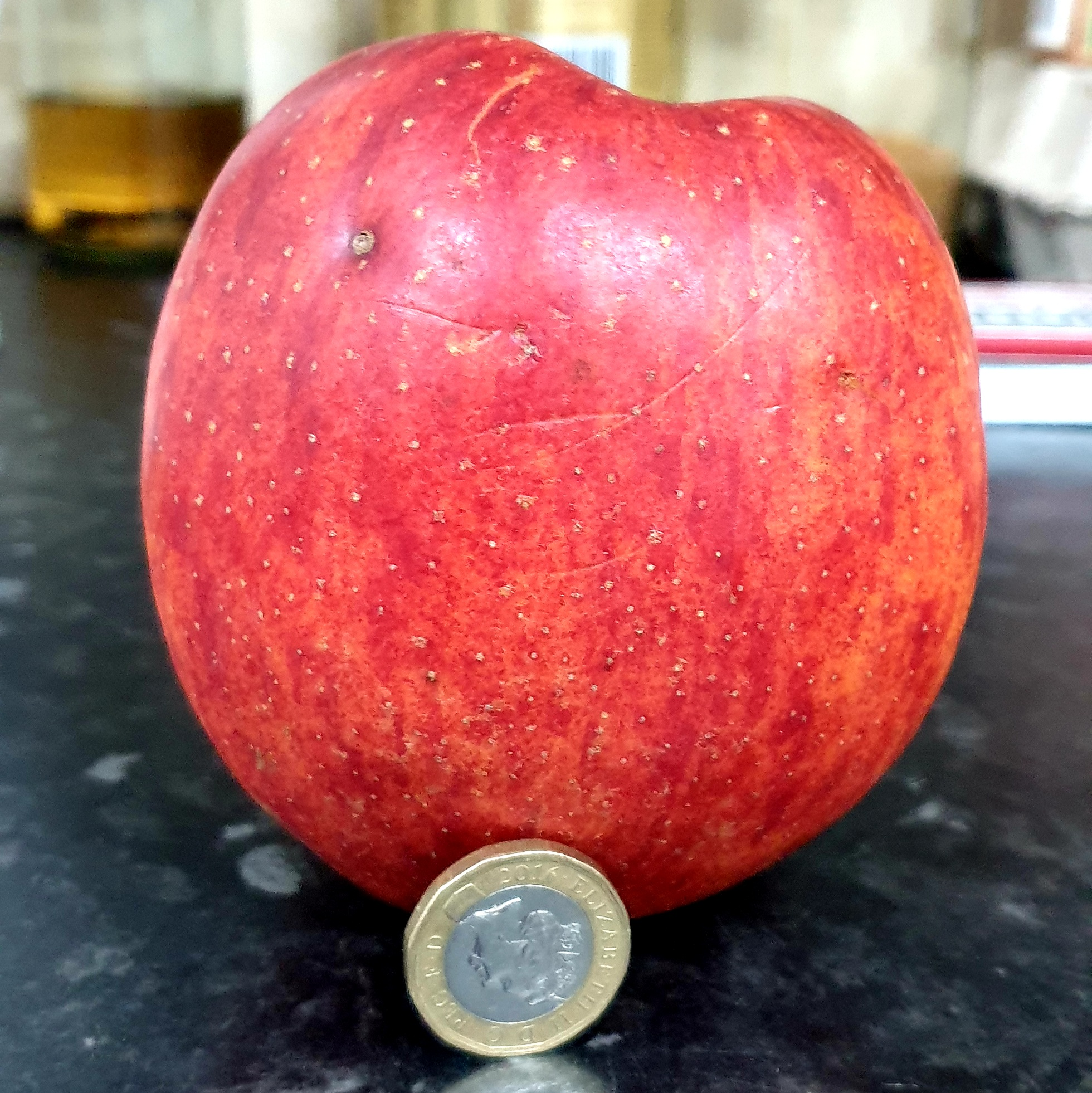
King of Tompkins County - November 2022 - Somerset UK

== Description ==
This apple is large, and of excellent quality both as a dessert fruit and for cooking. The fruit shape is uniform and the skin mostly red with some yellow stripes. The flesh is yellowish and crisp. The fruit does not keep as well as some other apple cultivars. The tree makes relatively poor root growth and should be grafted onto a different genotype that can provide more vigorous roots.
