= Stelrad =

- Company type: Public
- Traded as: LSE: SRAD
- Industry: Domestic heating
- Founded: 1936
- Headquarters: Marriott Road, S64 8BN
- Area served: Belgium, Netherlands, Germany, Austria, France, United Kingdom, Poland
- Products: Central heating radiators
- Parent: Ideal Stelrad Group
- Website: Stelrad

Stelrad is a British-based manufacturer of central heating radiators. Its Elite radiator is the most popular radiator in the United Kingdom.

== History ==
Founded in 1936 as the Steel Radiators company in Southall, London. It now makes products for central heating systems. It opened a factory in Dalbeattie, Dumfries and Galloway, in 1961, which closed in 1998.

== Structure ==
It is situated off the A6022 in Swinton, between the railway stations of Swinton and Mexborough. It has a seventeen-acre site.

The R&D site is in Belgium.

== Products ==
- Radiators – it produces over 2.5 million each year at its factory in South Yorkshire on four manufacturing lines, which operate twenty four hours a day, five days a week. Every radiator is Kitemarked under BS 442.
