= Pickering Beach, Ontario =

Pickering Beach
- Neighbourhood
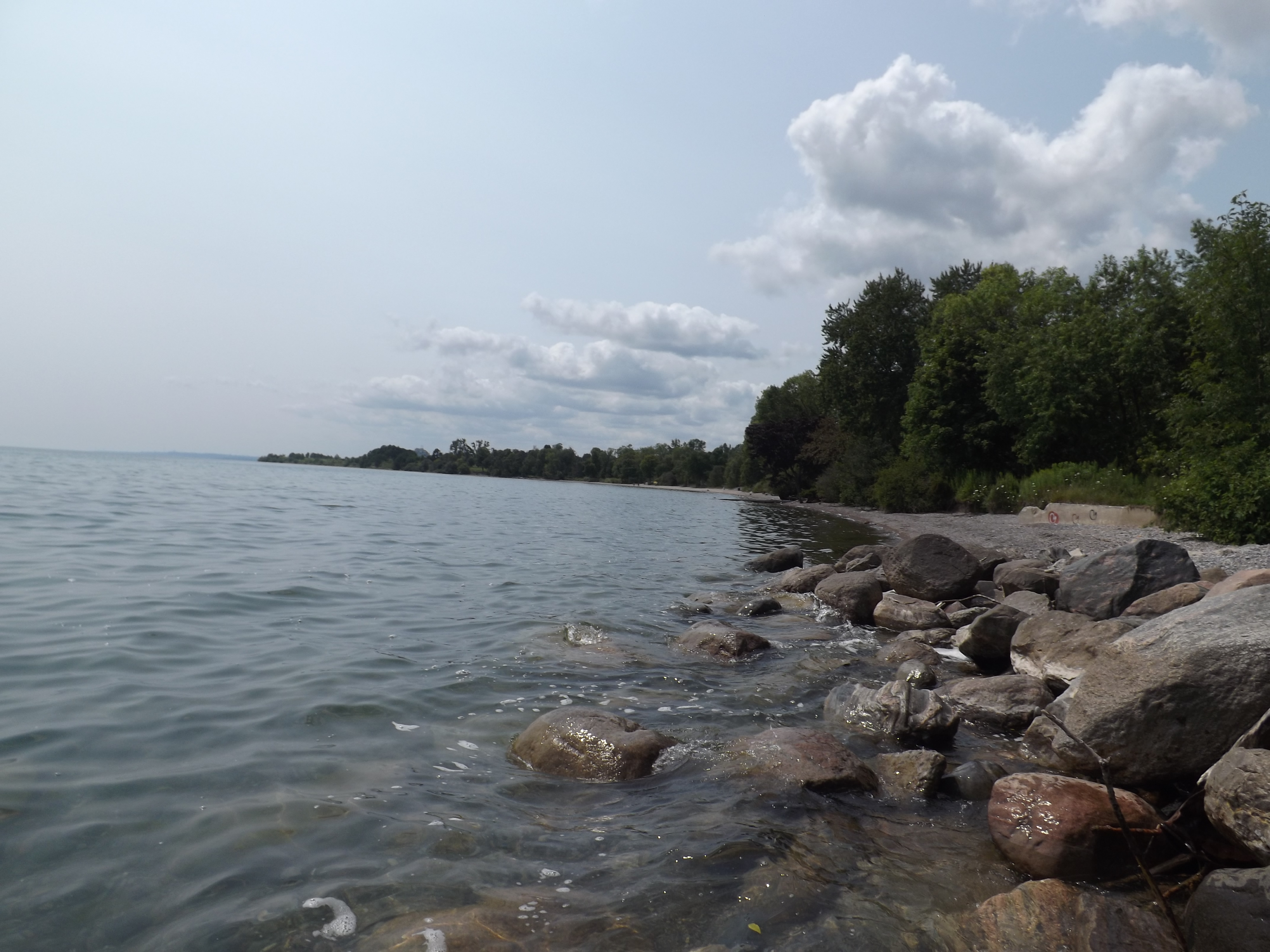
- Pickering Beach

- Location in southern Ontario
- Coordinates: 43°49′47″N 78°59′47″W
- Country: Canada
- Province: Ontario
- Regional municipality: Durham
- Town: Ajax
- Established: 1926

Population (2011)
  - Total: 1,263
- Time zone: UTC-5 (EST)
  - Summer (DST): UTC-4 (EDT)
- Forward sortation area: L1S
- Area codes: 905 and 289
- NTS Map: 030M15
- GNBC Code: FDPDS

Pickering Beach is a neighbourhood in the Ajax town of Ontario, Canada. Located on Lake Ontario east of Toronto, it was once an important cottage destination for Toronto's upper class.

In 1923, Toronto land developer James Tuckett bought an already existing proposed land development along the lakeshore in the Pickering Township to develop a seasonal cottage community. Previously a cottage and Beach resort named "Ontoro" had existed but not developed. Eventually the area post WW2 evolved into a permanently settled unincorporated community. The local residents formed an Association that organized events; raised funds for road maintenance and flood prevention; established a church, a school; operated a fire station as volunteers; and lobbied for municipal services such as electricity, garbage collection, and eventually sewage.

In the early 1970s, MTRCA acquired several lake front properties for a parkland. In 1974, Pickering Beach merged with the town of Ajax, within the Regional Municipality of Durham. Modern residences have now replaced the original cottages. The local beach is now called Paradise Beach, although the neighbourhood retains its original name.

== History ==
In 1923, James Tuckett, an Ontario land developer, purchased an existing proposed lakeside besch resort entitled "Ontoro" along the beach side at Lake Ontario now at the foot of Ajax. He expanded on a previous concept to decide the land into parcels of property for cottager. He initially built four cabins to rent for a sum of 25 cents per night. In his promotional literature, Tuckett described the Pickering Beach as "the ideal summer resort". The community became a popular weekend destination among the residents of Toronto. Beach sports, other outdoor activities, and dancing in a former barn was created by Jack Gould became popular activities for the visitors and the resident cottagers. Principal early landowners included the Gould and Corbet families.

=== Community Association ===
At the time of the community's establishment, the Powell Road (later Pickering Beach Road), the main path leading to the beach, was a dirt road. In the 1930s, Stanley Mann, a real estate manager hired by Tuckett, helped the local residents form the Pickering Beach Community Association to address issues such as poor condition of roads and flooding. The Association consulted with Tuckett, and came up with a plan to raise funds for improving the poor condition of the gravel roads leading to the Beach. The vendors at the Beach were now required to pay a license fee (up to a maximum of $15 per season); the collected amount would go towards the road maintenance. The number of vendors was restricted to two of each type; e.g. only two bakery wagons were allowed on the beach at a time.

In 1937, the Association formalized its constitution and elected officers. It had a nominal membership fee ($1 for residents, 25 cents for visitors), which paid for police presence during the events organized at the beach, among other things. The Association held monthly meetings at various cottages in rotation, and at rented spaces in Toronto during winter. It also organized various events such as races, tug-o-war contests, softball games, bingo games, and Christmas Euchres.

By 1935, electricity supply had reached the lakefront cottages and farmers through power lines. By 1938, the Association had 150 members. It lobbied for lower electricity rates, and negotiated weekly garbage collection from the cottages for a fee of $3 per season. prior garbage placement was simply either burned or buried often at the back on cottagers property.

Just prior to the end of WWII some cottagers started moving to Pickering Beach and made their cottages into year round homes this included several former military servicepeople looking to start new lives. The first home built for the purpose of a year-round dwelling was the Corbet "Beach House" in 1951 located at the former 101 Orchard Drive.

The local taxpayers formed the Pickering Beach Ratepayers' Association, which lobbied for facilities such as street lights, fire station, and upgraded telephone and power lines. In the 1970s, the Ratepayers' Association was renamed to Pickering Beach Residents Association. It started a newspaper, The Beach Newsview, which covered local news, births, deaths, and family profiles. The Association organized the Strawberry Shortcake Festival every June. The festival featured shortcakes and entertainment, and the proceeds were donated to charitable causes including the Ajax and Pickering General Hospital.

=== Pickering Beach Community Church ===
By 1945, Stanley Mann had become a fundamentalist Christian, and established a Sunday school at his home in the spring of 1945. In 1949, he founded the Pickering Beach Mission, and donated a lot at the corner of Lakeview Boulevard and Cherry Street for building a church. He started the construction of the Pickering Beach Community Church, with help and donations from other local residents, and from his friends based in Oshawa and Whitby.

The Church was dedicated on 24 June 1950, with a congregation of 160 people. Further additions were made to the church in the following year, to make it usable throughout the year. In 1956, an auditorium was added.

The Church closed after MTRCA acquired lake front properties.

=== School ===
In 1867, United Empire Loyalists had built a one-room red brick schoolhouse on Pickering Beach Road. Initially, the children of the Pickering Beach community attended this school, known as the "little red brick school".

As the number of students increased with rise in population, a new school building was proposed at a Pickering Township meeting. The local Home and School Association raised the funds for equipment and other costs through bingo, euchre, plays and carnivals.

The construction of the new school - named Paradise School - began in June 1954, but once one wall was erected Hurricane Hazel destroyed it on 15 October 1954. The school building opened in June 1955, and approximately 100 students started classes there in September.

Once the mortgage was paid on Paradise School it closed in 1974, after MTRCA acquired its land for parkland.

=== Fire station ===
In the 1950s, there were two major house fires in the area. The Pickering Township agreed to establish the South East Pickering Fire Hall, on the condition that the local residents provided the volunteers for operating it. The fire station was initially established in the form of a garage-like structure that accommodated a trailer carrying a water pump, a fire hose and nozzles.

In 1967, a cement block building housing a fire truck replaced the garage. The volunteer firemen's wives often answered the calls, as the men had full-time jobs. The women also helped raise funds for the costs not covered by the Township, by organizing bake sales, euchre nights, and dances held at the local school.

Besides fighting fires, the fire department helped erect sandbag barriers at the lake, and participated in other community projects. In 1974, after amalgamation of Pickering Beach into the town of Ajax, the South East Pickering Fire Department became part of the Ajax Fire Department. In 1989, the South East Pickering fire station shut down, and the town's Parks and Recreation Department started using its building as storage.

=== MTRCA expropriation and merger with Ajax ===
In the early 1970s, the Metropolitan Toronto and Region Conservation Authority (MTRCA) began acquiring property along the lake front east of Toronto. Around 20 homes, the Pickering Beach Community Church, and the Paradise School building were demolished for a parkland.

In 1974, the unincorporated community became a part of the town of Ajax. The local beach was now part of Ajax instead of the neighbouring city of Pickering, which retained the Township's name. In the late 2010s, the beach was renamed to "Paradise Beach".

=== Water distribution and sewage system ===
In 1972, piped drinking water reached Pickering Beach, but there was no sewer system: the locals had septic systems. The Pickering Township had banned new construction in the area because of high water table. Real estate agents had misled several people into purchasing vacant lots in the area, and because of the ban, these buyers were unable to subdivide their lots or build houses on them.

In the 1980s, these buyers lobbied to the Town of Ajax as well as the Durham Region, for installation of sanitary sewers in the area. After a survey of rate payers, the local administration installed sanitary sewers (but not storm sewers) in the area.

== Borders and demographics ==
As a neighbourhood of Ajax, Pickering Beach is bordered by Pickering Beach Road in the west, southern part of Rollo Dr in the north, Carruthers Creek in the east, and Lake Ontario in the south. Neighbourhoods bordering it include Clover Ridge in the west, Southwood in the north, and Lakeside in the east.

According to the 2011 census of Canada, Pickering Beach had a population of 1263 residing in 403 dwellings.

== Notable residents ==
Among notable Canadians who were born in, lived in, or visited the beach are grocery chain founder T. P. Loblaw, wrestler 'Whipper' Billy Watson and artist Florence Helena McGillivray. Christian Cardell Corbet, Royal Sculptor was born there and painted there annually until 2004.
