= Carruthers Creek (Canada) =

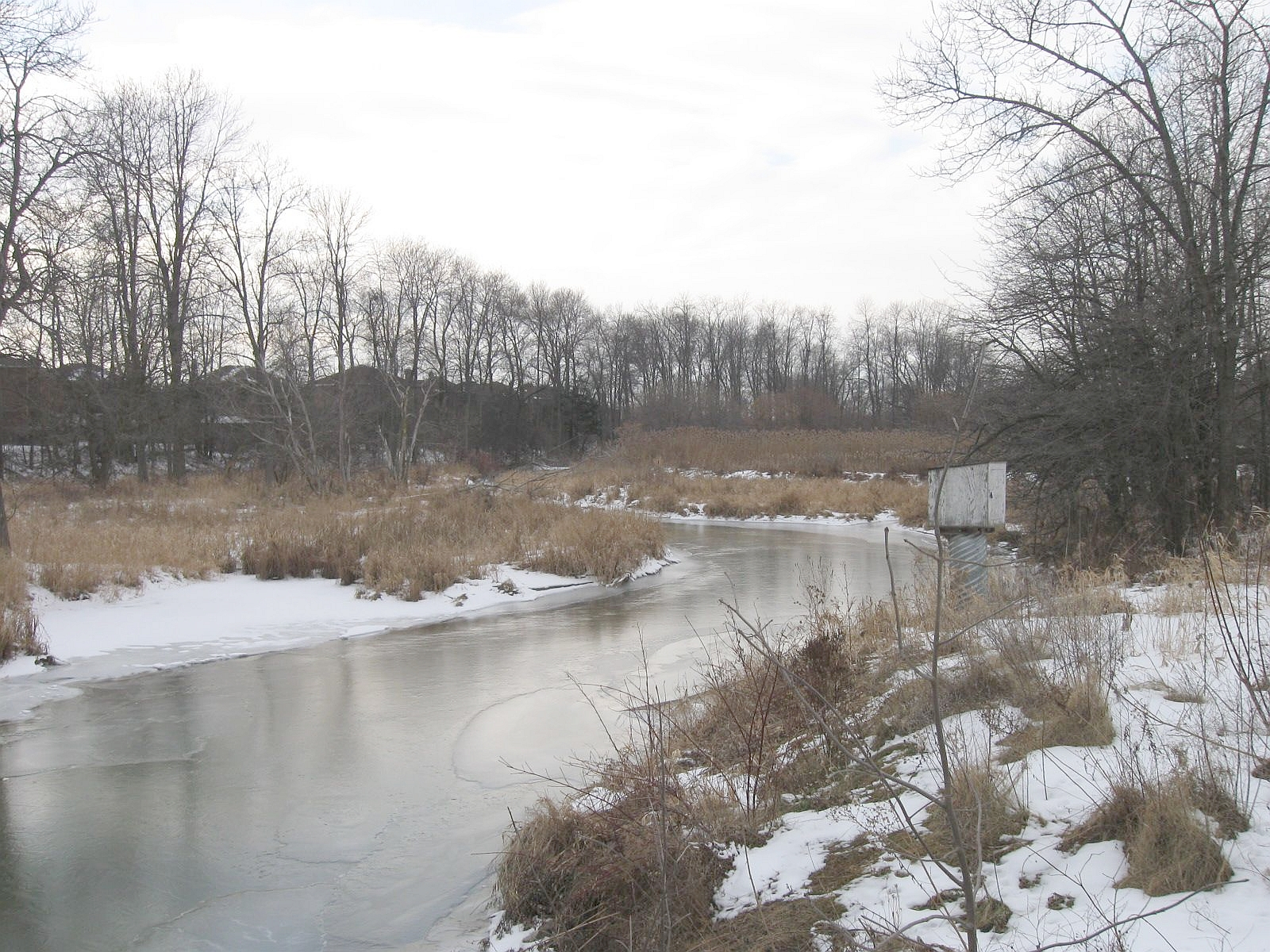
- Carruthers Creek in Ajax

- Location of the mouth of the Carruthers Creek in southern Ontario

Location
- Country: Canada
- Province: Ontario
- Area: Greater Toronto Area
- Region: Regional Municipality of Durham
- Municipalities: Pickering; Ajax

Physical characteristics
- Source
  - location: Near Concession Road 7, Mount Zion, Pickering.
- Mouth
  - location: Richardson Point, Ajax
  - coordinates: 43°49′37″N 78°59′06″W
- Length: 20 km (12 mi)
- Width
  - maximum: 3 km

Basin features
- River system: Great Lakes Basin

The Carruthers Creek is a stream in the Durham Region of Ontario, Canada. Its watershed lies within the boundaries of Pickering and Ajax.

== Etymology ==
The stream is named after Richard Carruthers (1819-1887), an English immigrant from Cumberland, whose family owned 202 acres along the banks of the Creek. Carruthers, a farmer, purchased Lots 4 and 5 on Concession Road 1 in January 1856 and September 1862, and the land remained in his family until at least the 1940s. It is remarkable that the stream is named after him, because his family was not the earliest, the wealthiest or the most prominent landowner in the region.

== History ==
The Carruthers Creek watershed includes 32 archaeological sites, 24 of which are identified with indigenous peoples, 7 with European settlers, and 1 of uncertain origin. Of the indigenous sites, 5 belong to Archaic period, 2 belong to Woodland period, and 17 are of undetermined date.

The five Archaic period sites, dated 7000-1000 BCE, are all located inland, and are marked by discovery of chert (flint) tools and flakes. The discoveries do not provide much information other than suggesting that the indigenous people hunted and camped in the Carruthers Creek watershed. It was common for indigenous groups to engage in seasonal activities such as fishing at the mouth of various streams and rivers on the Lake Ontario shore. However, if any site providing evidence of such activities near the mouth of Carruthers Creek existed, it would now be under water, as the Creek's mouth met Lake Ontario at a location 10–20 m below the present surface level at the end of the Last Glacial Period. The watershed contains two sites from the early and middle Woodland period, dated to 1000 BCE-700 CE. Not much research has been done on these sites, but they appear to be short-term campsites.

In the mid-17th century, the Iroquois people displaced the Petun and the Wendat (Huron) from what is now southern Ontario. The Iroquois Seneca people established river-side villages in nearby areas, such as Ganatsekwyagon on Rouge and Teiaiagon on Humber. However, the Carruthers Creek watershed does not show evidence of any settlement similar in size or importance. Nevertheless, it is likely that the indigenous people used the mouth of the creek for hunting and fishing. The Sulpician missionaries who settled in neighbouring areas were aware of the stream's existence in the late 17th century, although early French maps (such as Louis Jolliet's 1673 map) do not show the Carruthers Creek.

By the end of the 18th century, much of the land in the Carruthers Creek watershed was owned by Smith family through land patents, or was held as Crown and Clergy reserves. The Smiths were absentee landlords: Major John Smith (d. 1795) of 5th Regiment of Foot served at Detroit, while his son David W. Smith (1764-1837) served at Detroit and Niagara. The Smith family held 20,000 acres of land in Upper Canada, including 7,800 acres in the Pickering Township that included the Carruthers Creek.

The earliest permanent settlers in the area included the family of James Powell, who migrated from New Brunswick to Pickering Township in 1808. A prominent early settler was George Washington Post, who purchased a lot in May 1812, and built the Post Tavern there in 1814. The Tavern was located at the intersection of Carruthers Creek and Kingston Road (near 367 Kingston Rd East). It was a major stopover during long journeys on Kingston Road until 1856, when the Grand Trunk Railway rendered it obsolete.

Throughout the 19th century, several persons of European origin (not necessary settlers) leased, purchased, and re-sold land in the Carruthers Creek area. In the 1820s, the reserved lands in the vicinity of Carruthers Creek were patented to the King's College (1828) and the Canada Company (1829). These two institutions sold much of the land during 1831-1838.

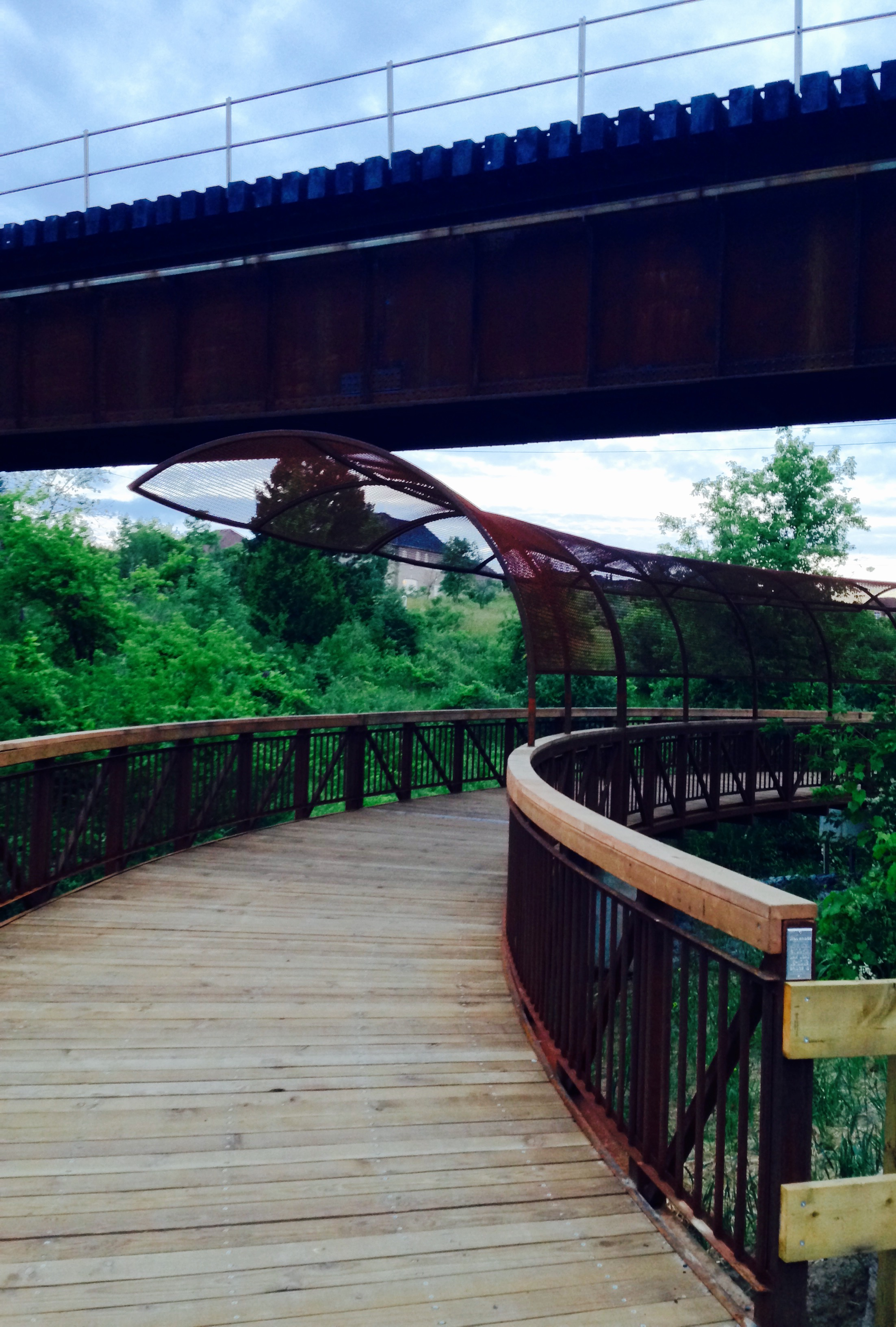
A recreation trail running along Carruthers Creek in the Audley North neighbourhood of Ajax

By the mid-19th century, several farms and small orchards existed in the area. Compared to the Duffins Creek area, a small number of mills were established along the Carruthers Creek. This was probably because the water supply in the Carruthers Creek was not consistent. The largest mill along the Carruthers Creek was located on the 3rd Concession Line, near the Audley village.

By the 1850s, three small communities existed in the Carruthers Creek watershed:

- Audley (Brown's Corners) in present-day Ajax, centered on the intersection of present-day Audley Road and Taunton Rd
- Kinsale, in present-day Pickering, centered on the intersection of Kinsale Road and Highway 7
- Salem (Hyfield or Salem's Corners), in present-day Pickering, centered on the intersection of Salem Road and Highway 7

These small villages did not grow as much as other settlements in the present-day Durham region, because the smaller size of the Carruthers Creek did not facilitate establishment of major mills, and because the Grand Trunk Railway did not pass through these villages.

In 2022, the government designated 0.62 sq. km. of wetland in the Carruthers Creek watershed in Ajax as protected area, to be managed by Toronto and Region Conservation Authority (TRCA) and the town of Ajax. The city of Pickering has planned a community called Veraine, to be developed by Dorsay Development Corporation, near the headwaters of the Carruthers Creek. The town of Ajax has opposed this development, because of the concerns that it may cause flooding at the south end of the Creek. The flood-prone area is Ajax's Lakeside neighbourhood, where the stream passes on its way to the Carruthers Creek Marsh, before meeting Lake Ontario.

== Course ==
Carruthers Creek originates near Concession Road 7, near the former community of Mount Zion, in the city of Pickering. It then flows south and enters Ajax, passing through the Deer Creek Golf Course, and finally meeting Lake Ontario at Richardson Point. The size of its watershed is smaller than that of Duffins Creek in the west and Lynde Creek in the east. It is the smallest watershed within the jurisdiction of TRCA.

The stream is approximately 20 km long, and 3 km at its widest point.
