= Claremont, Ontario =

Claremont
- Unincorporated community
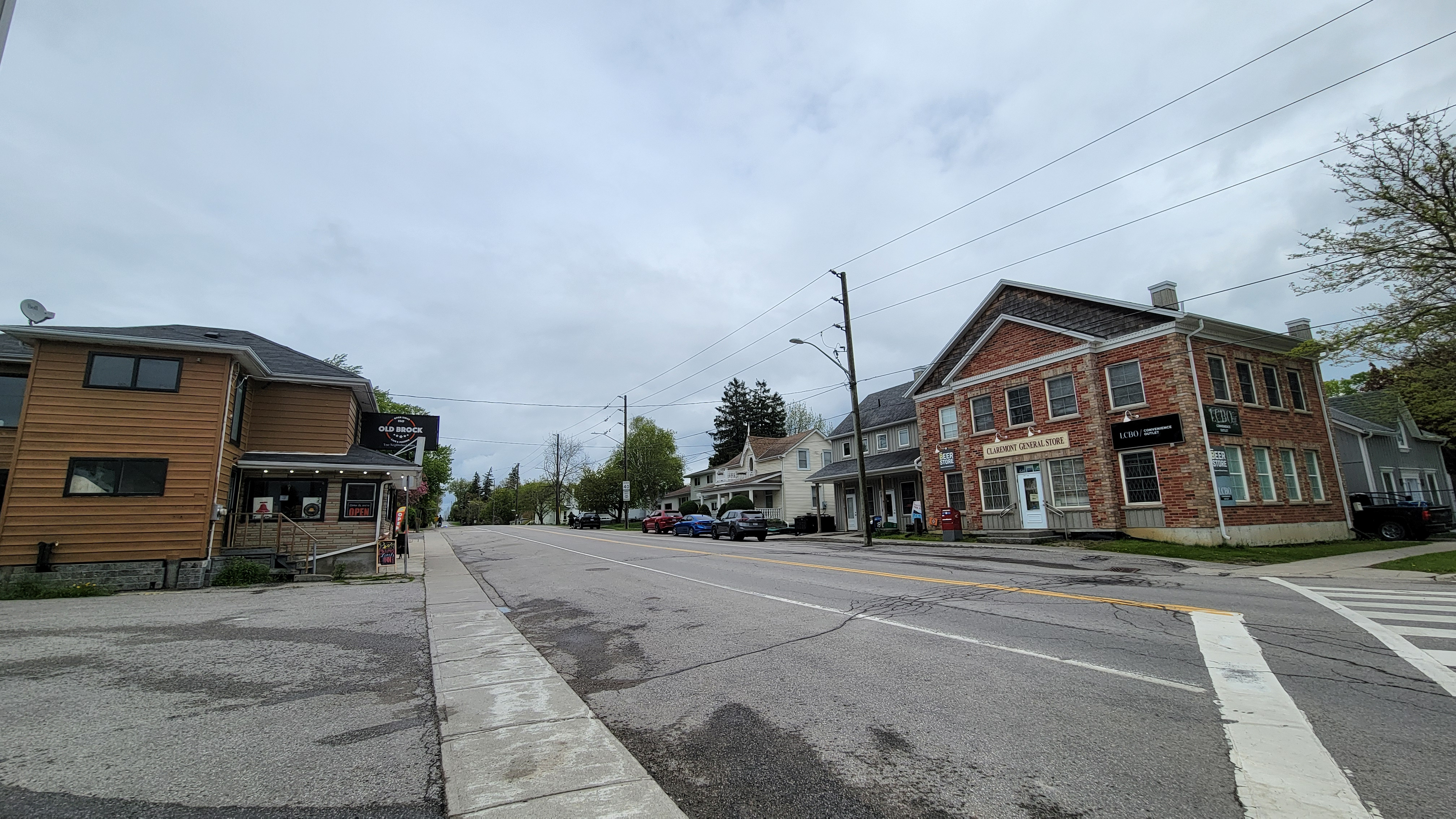
- Main thoroughfare of Claremont
- Interactive map of Claremont
- Coordinates: 43°58′21″N 79°07′45″W
- Country: Canada
- Province: Ontario
- Regional municipality: Durham
- City: Pickering
- Established: 1840

Area
  - Total: 5 km^{2} (1.9 sq mi)
- Elevation: 266 m (873 ft)

Population (2016)
  - Total: 1,202
- Time zone: UTC-5 (EST)
  - Summer (DST): UTC-4 (EDT)
- Forward sortation area: L1S, L1T, L1Y, L1Z
- Area code: 905
- NTS Map: 030M14
- GNBC Code: FARBB

Claremont is an unincorporated community in Southern Ontario in the north part of Pickering, Ontario, Canada. Historically, Claremont was part of Pickering Township, Ontario County, Ontario until 1974 when Ontario County was amalgamated into the Regional Municipality of Durham, which had just been established.

Claremont is one of many rural villages with suburban type housing mixed with older historic buildings in the Greater Toronto Area. Brock Road, the main north–south regional road in the area, was realigned to bypass the village to the east in 1970. Claremont is just below the Oak Ridges Moraine, in the Greenbelt. Typical of the moraine countryside, around 50 to 70% of the land area around Claremont is forested. The remaining land around the village is wooded farmland and streams.

Until the establishment of regional government in 1974, the municipal offices of the former Township of Pickering were located in Claremont.

Access to and traffic through Claremont increased greatly with the completion of the eastern extension of the Highway 407, which has terminated at the Brock Road exit since 2001.

The Havelock Subdivision of the Canadian Pacific Railway runs through Claremont. This line is used for freight traffic, but there have been proposals for the return of passenger service as part of a GO Transit expansion to Peterborough.

Claremont is located 20 km northwest of Oshawa and about 55 km northeast of Downtown Toronto.

Claremont has an elementary school from junior kindergarten to grade 8 and also has a cafe and a convenience store.

== Nearest places ==
- Markham, west
- Whitchurch-Stouffville, northwest
- Uxbridge, north
- Brooklin, east
- Greenwood, southeast
- Pickering, south

== History ==
In 1972, the Government of Canada expropriated 7,530 ha of land just west of Claremont for a possible future airport.

Indeed, by the late-1990s, the Greater Toronto Airport Authority (GTAA) there were plans initiated to build an international Airport in Pickering which would be constructed to relieve congestion at Pearson International Airport, located some 70 km to the southwest. This new airport was also going to become the main cargo facility for the Greater Toronto Area.

But air traffic at Pearson declined in the years to follow and is only slowly returning (although it has not reached) to previous passenger volumes.

Also, terminal expansion at Pearson and the massive Cargo infield development by the GTAA have further delayed Pickering Airport from becoming a reality, at least in the near future. But in 2005, there has been renewed discussion about airport construction. The plan anticipates 11.9 million passengers per year (or 32,600 per day) by 2032. A confidential "needs analysis study" was completed by the Greater Toronto Airports Authority for the federal government in May 2010; in summer 2010 Transport Canada began a "due diligence review."

The current landholders, mostly rural farmers are leasing the land from the federal government. Claremont is the closest community to the future airport/terminal building locations.

The Claremont General Store was destroyed by fire in July 2009. The building was built in 1847 and had been operated as a General Store since it was originally built - one of the longest operating General Stores in Canada.

== Demographics ==
In the 2021 Census of Population conducted by Statistics Canada, Claremont had a population of 1,215 living in 402 of its 413 total private dwellings, a change of 1.1% from its 2016 population of 1,202. With a land area of 2.12 km^{2} (0.82 sq mi), it had a population density of 573.1/km^{2} (1,484.4/sq mi) in 2021.

== Community features ==
Claremont has a fire station and community hall, two churches, a Royal Canadian Legion hall (Branch 483), cafe (Old Brock Cafe), community co-op (which also serves as a Liquor Control Board of Ontario and Beer Store outlet) and an elementary school (Claremont Public School).

Claremont was also the hometown of legendary Canadian painter Tom Thomson, who was born in Claremont on August 5, 1877.

== Community events ==
=== Yard Sale Day ===
Claremont is well known in the local area for its annual "Yard Sale Day", an event where all residents are invited to host simultaneous garage/yard sales. The sale is typically held on the second or third Saturday of June and has been known to draw well over 1000 visitors and bargain hunters to the small hamlet. Due to its popularity, the annual event also spawns fundraisers, BBQs, and other community gatherings.

=== Winter Carnival ===
Claremont hosts its annual Winter Carnival that marks 1 week worth of events in January or February. Popular events/activities include a winter parade through town, a teen dance at the local community centre, karaoke at the Royal Canadian Legion, and the highly anticipated Trapper's Ball, along with a host of traditional winter activities including walking in deep snow, sliding on sleds, family skates at an outdoor community rink, and a neighbourhood snow sculpture contest.

Claremont is part of the City of Pickering which is governed by an elected city Council consisting of six councillors and one Mayor. The City of Pickering is divided into three wards, each ward electing a City Councillor and a Regional Councillor. Claremont is part of Ward 3.

The current council was elected in November 2022. The members of the council are:
Mayor Kevin Ashe
Ward 1 (South West Pickering) City Councillor Lisa Robinson
Ward 1 (South West Pickering) Regional Councillor Maurice Brenner
Ward 2 (South & Central Pickering) City Councillor Mara Nagy
Ward 2 (South & Central Pickering) Regional Councillor Linda Cook
Ward 3 (South East & North Pickering) City Councillor Shaheen Butt
Ward 3 (South East & North Pickering) Regional Councillor David Pickles
