= Greenwood, Ontario =

Greenwood, Ontario, may refer to:

- Greenwood, Durham Regional Municipality, Ontario
- Greenwood, a community in Laurentian Valley, Renfrew County, Ontario
- Greenwood (Ontario federal electoral district), a federal electoral district in Toronto, represented in the Canadian House of Commons from 1935 to 1979
