= Pickering, Ontario =

Pickering
- City (lower-tier)
- City of Pickering
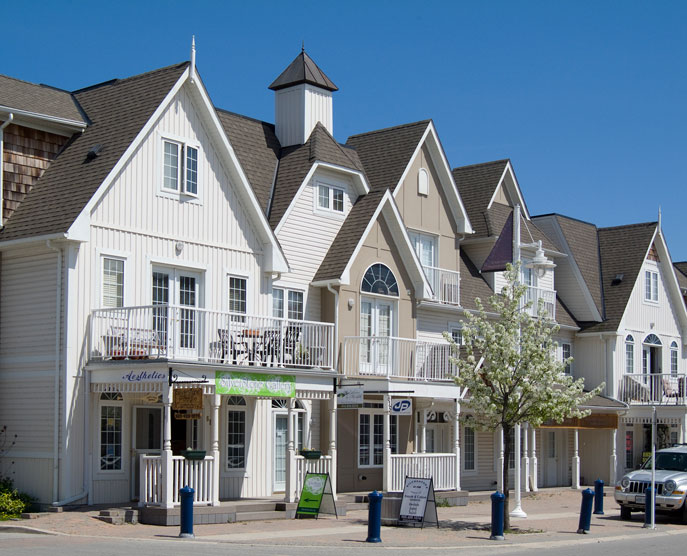
- Nautical Village on Lake Ontario

- Flag
- Nicknames: PK
- Interactive map of Pickering
- Location within Regional Municipality of Durham Location within Southern Ontario
- Coordinates: 43°50′22″N 79°4′53″W
- Country: Canada
- Province: Ontario
- Region: Durham (York County 1811–1852 and Ontario County 1852–1974)
- Established: 1811 (township); 1974 (town); 2000 (city)

Government
  - Mayor: Kevin Ashe
  - Governing body: Pickering City Council
  - MP: Juanita Nathan (L)
  - MPP: Peter Bethlenfalvy (PC)

Area (2021)
  - Total: 231.59 km^{2} (89.42 sq mi)
- Elevation: 83.8 m (275 ft)

Population (2021)
  - Total: 99,186 (59th)
  - Density: 383.1/km^{2} (992/sq mi)
- Time zone: UTC−05:00 (EST)
  - Summer (DST): UTC−04:00 (EDT)
- Forward Sortation Area: L1V to L1Y
- Area codes: 905, 289, 365, and 742
- Highways: Highway 401 / Highway 407 Highway 7
- Website: pickering.ca

Pickering (2021 census population: 99,186) is a city located in Southern Ontario, Canada, immediately east of Toronto in the Regional Municipality of Durham. It is named after the town of Pickering, in North Yorkshire.

Beginning in the 1770s, the area was settled by primarily British colonists. An increase in population occurred after the American Revolutionary War, when the Crown resettled United Empire Loyalist and encouraged new immigration. Many of the smaller rural communities have been preserved and function as provincially significant historic sites in the Golden Horseshoe and Ontario museums. The city also includes the Pickering Casino Resort, a multi-billion-dollar casino complex.

== History ==
=== Early period ===
The present-day Pickering was the territory of Indigenous peoples for thousands of years. The Wendat (called the Huron by Europeans), who spoke Wyandot, an Iroquoian language, were the historical people living here in the 15th century. Archeological remains of a large village have been found here, known as the Draper Site. Later, the Wendat moved northwest to Georgian Bay, where they established their historic homeland. There they encountered French explorers in the early 17th century, followed by missionaries and fur traders.

The first recorded history of this area was made in 1669, when a missionary from French, François de Salignac de la Mothe-Fénelon of the Society of the Priests of Saint Sulpice, noted reaching what he called the Seneca (more likely the Onondaga) village of Gandatsetiagon, on the shores of Frenchman's Bay (for whom it would be named). The Onondaga (and the Seneca) were among the Five Nations of the Haudenosaunee Confederacy. The Onondaga (and other Haudenosaunee) generally occupied territory to the south and west of Lakes Ontario and Erie in present-day New York that extended into Pennsylvania and the Ohio Valley, where they maintained hunting grounds. (The Seneca were located farther west, near Seneca Lake, among the Finger Lakes. Fenelon wintered at the village and started missionary work with this people.)

=== Township of Pickering ===
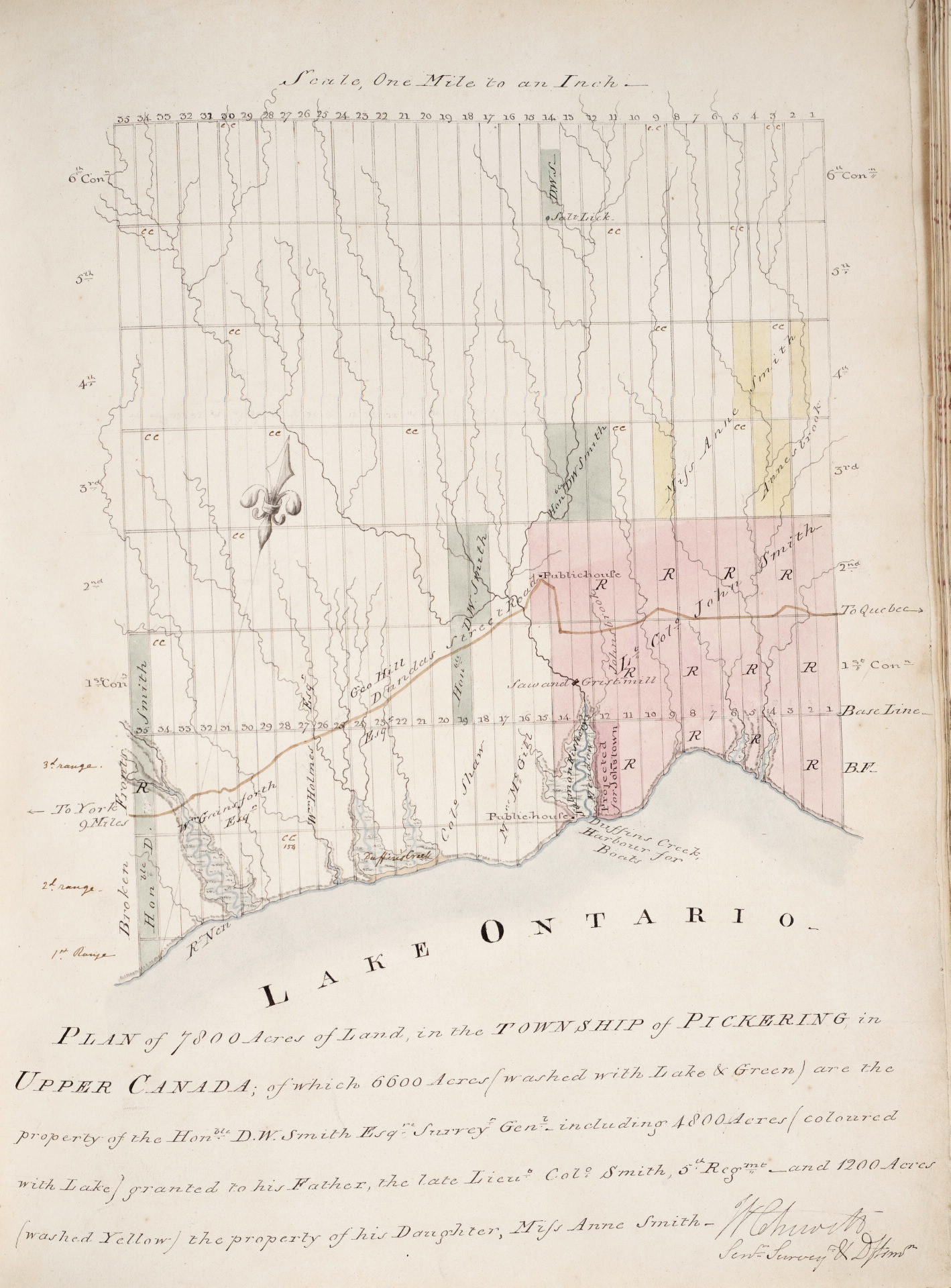
1802 map of the Pickering Township

The British took over Canada in 1763 following defeat of the French in the Seven Years' War, known in Colonial America as the French and Indian War. British colonial settlers were steadily migrating into the area from eastern areas of Canada. There is some controversy over the identity of the earliest European settler in the area. One of the candidates is Mike Duffin, who settled in what later became the Pickering Village (now in Ajax), possibly in the 1770s. The other candidate is Benjamin Wilson of Vermont, who probably lived in Pickering for sometime, before moving to Whitby in 1794.

In the 1780s, the present-day Pickering area was a part of the Nassau District of the Province of Quebec. In 1791, Augustus Jones undertook a survey of the area, establishing the baseline and some of the concessions. The same year, the District was transferred to the newly created province of Upper Canada. In 1792, the district was renamed Home District, and Pickering was established as a township.

The township was originally called "Edinburgh" but in 1792 was renamed after the town of Pickering in the English county of Yorkshire. Pickering Village, now part of Ajax, emerged as the major population and commercial centre of the Pickering Township in the early 19th century. The conversion of a local trail into the Kingston Road in 1799 contributed greatly to the increased settlement in the area. In 1807, Quakers led by Timothy Rogers settled in the area, and by 1809, the population of Pickering Township consisted of 180 people, most of whom lived along the Duffins Creek. In 1811, the Pickering Township became a separate municipality. Several sawmills, gristmills, taverns, and other businesses operated in the area. During the War of 1812, the maintenance of the Kingston Road improved because of the increased military traffic and further contributed to the development of the area.

Reesor Mills, Altona in 1877

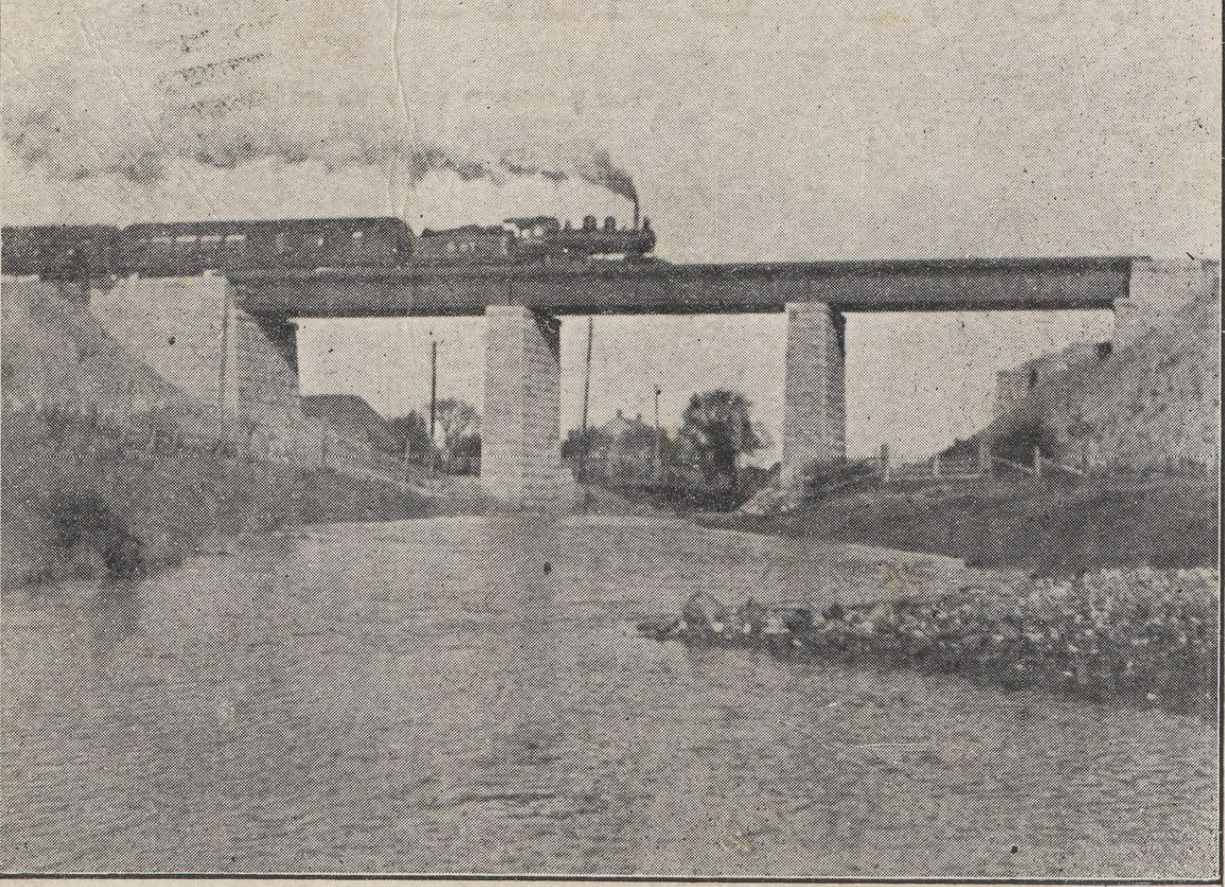
Grand Trunk Railway bridge on the Duffins Creek in 1908

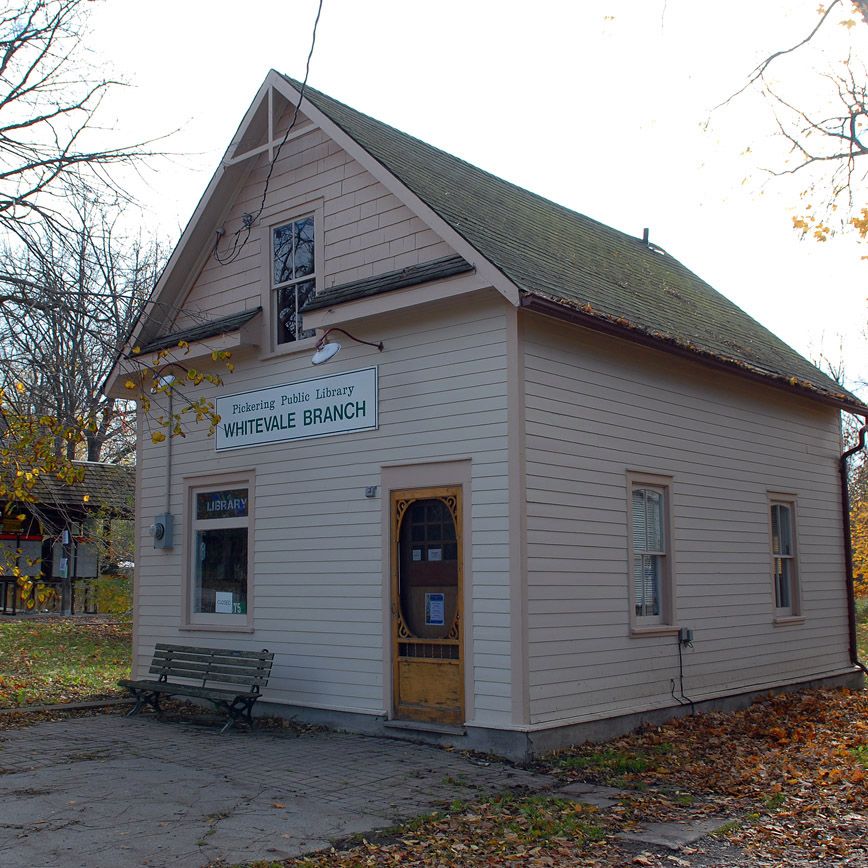
Historic Whitevale Library

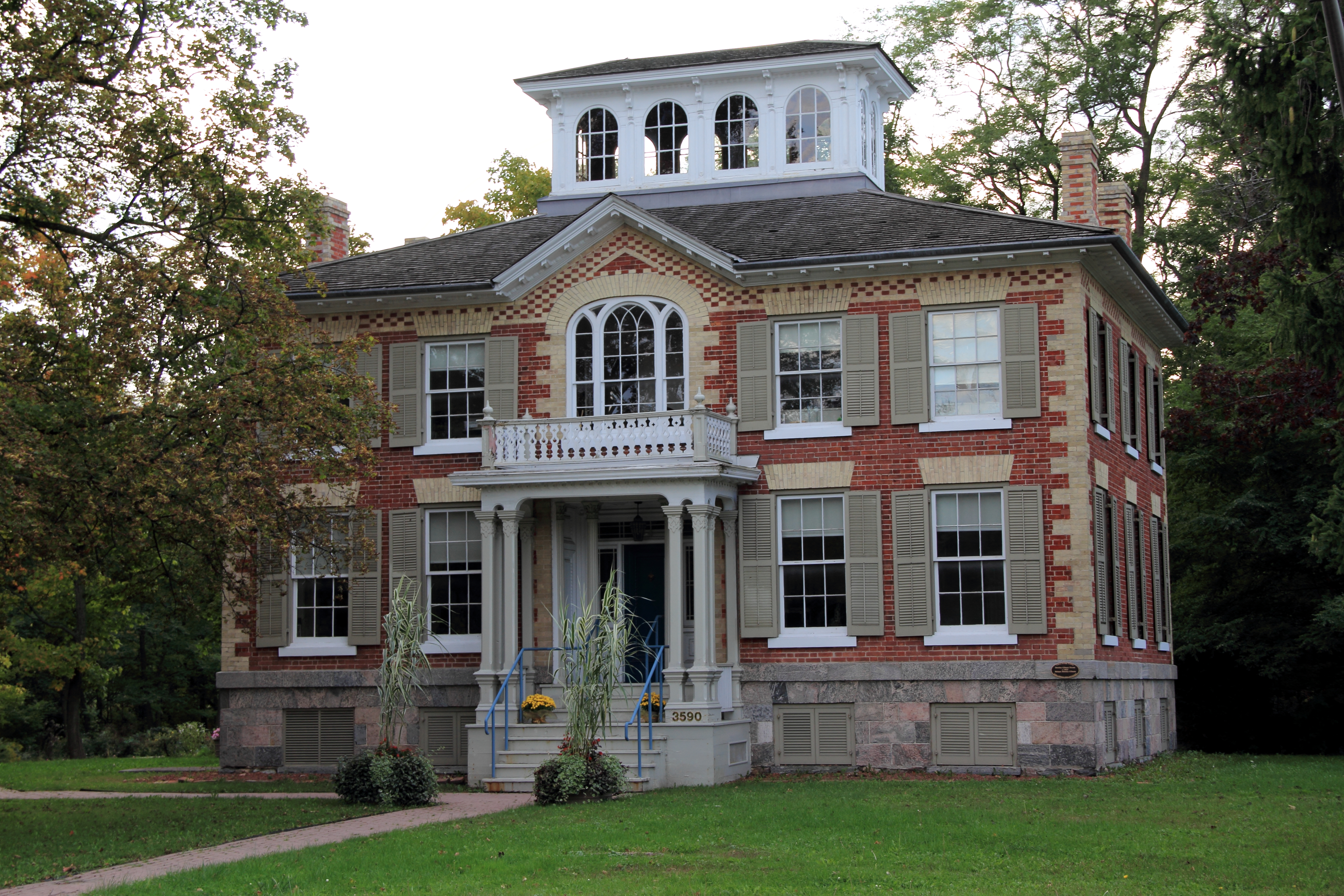
Benley House, a heritage site in Brougham

In the 19th century, several other small communities developed in the Duffins Creek watershed, within the Pickering Township. These included Whitevale, Brougham, Green River, Claremont, Altona, Greenwood, and Balsam. A few communities also developed in the smaller Carruthers Creek watershed, including Audley (now part of Ajax), Kinsale, and Salem. In 1849, the village of Dunbarton was established along the Dunbarton Creek. The Grand Trunk Railway reached the Township in 1856.

Pickering was represented in the Mackenzie Rebellion of 1837. One of its leaders, Peter Matthews, had been one of the most prominent members of the community. In 1851, the Pickering Township was severed from the York County, and became a part of the newly established Ontario County.

In the later decades of the 19th century, a fall in the demand for wheat led to economic decline in the primarily-agricultural township. The township lost over 40% of its population in the second half of the 19th century, and the decline continued in the first half of the 20th century.

In the first half of the 20th century, two new communities emerged in the Pickering Township: the cottage community of Pickering Beach and the self-contained community around the federal government-owned Defence Industries Limited Pickering Works munitions plant. Both areas are now part of Ajax. After the World War II, urbanization began in the southern part of Pickering, and later spread to other parts of the Township.

=== City of Pickering ===
On 1 January 1974, the Ontario County was dissolved, and the area became part of the Regional Municipality of Durham. The southeastern portion of the Pickering Township, including the Pickering Village and Pickering High School, became part of the independent town of Ajax. The rest of the township became the Town of Pickering, which in 2000, became the City of Pickering.

In the last quarter of the 20th century, much of the government-owned land in northern Pickering sat idle because of uncertainty over the proposed Pickering Airport. That included the land expropriated by the federal government for the airport and the adjacent land expropriated by the provincial government for the proposed Seaton community that would benefit from the airport.

The development of Seaton picked up pace in the 21st century, but as of 2022, only 1,549 of the 20,989 planned units had been built. The city also considered the development of a new community called Veraine, to be built in northeastern Pickering. The city also saw a rise in the number of high-rise condos.

== Cityscape ==
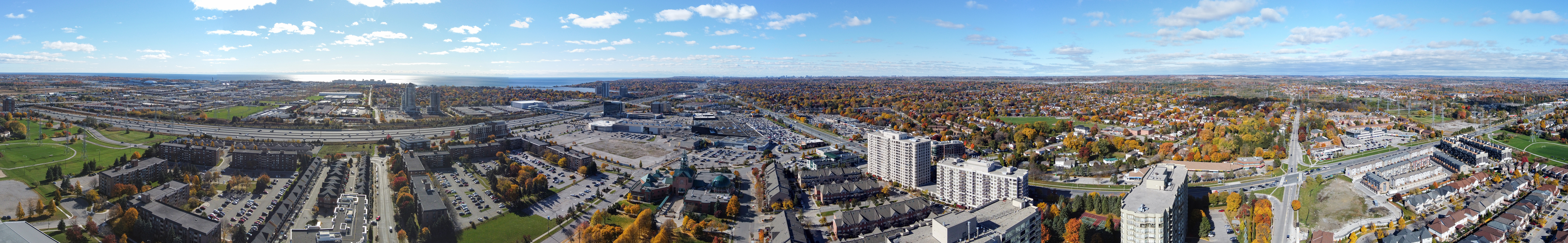
Aerial view of Pickering, Ontario in 2023

== Geography ==
Pickering territory (red) within Durham Region

The city covers an area of 231 square kilometres (89 sq mi) with an elevation of 89 metres (292 ft).

Toronto, Markham, and Rouge Park border Pickering on the west; Ajax and Whitby border Pickering on the east; Uxbridge is to the north; and Lake Ontario forms Pickering's southern boundary.

=== Communities ===
The southern part of the city is mainly suburban, with industrial areas restricted to the area around Pickering Nuclear Generating Station. Most of the suburban areas were built as subdivisions after World War II, starting in the area around Frenchman's Bay. Prior to the war, the few suburban areas in the township were the communities of Dunbarton, Fairport Beach, Liverpool Market, and Rouge Hill. Squires Beach, located by the lake shore in the southeast part of the city, is now a ghost town as the area was cleared from 1966 to make way for the construction of the Pickering Nuclear Generating Station. The only home standing in Squires Beach was built by Timothy Rogers in 1842 and relocated to Montgomery Park Road. Squires Beach Road is now cut off from the lake by a waste water treatment plant.

The northern part of the municipality is mainly rural, primarily used for agricultural purposes. However, a number of residential developments are found in this area, and the locally controversial Seaton area also falls within this part of the city. The primary rural communities in Pickering are Claremont, Brougham, and Whitevale; a number of smaller communities exist throughout northern Pickering, such as Greenwood. John Diefenbaker, a Prime Minister of Canada, lived in Greenwood for a number of years.

The abandoned ghost town of Altona is located there. Cherrywood, another hamlet in Pickering, is one of the few areas that are protected within the Greenbelt.

The communities of Kinsale in the northeast and Green River on the York-Durham town line are other small communities in Pickering, with a population each of between 50 and 100 people. Most of these communities were founded in the 1700s and 1800s and have churches and historic estates that have been restored through government funding. Dixie is a small rural community situated in rural Pickering, with more contemporary buildings.

The film industry has been very active in communities such as Whitevale, since the 1980s, due to the quality of the historical buildings and untouched nature of the landscape. The television shows Hannibal (2013–2015) Suits (2011–2019), and American Gods (2017) have filmed extensively in Whitevale and in other locations in Pickering.

Nautical Village is located at Frenchman's Bay and features entertainment, a playground, a boardwalk, restaurants, shops and an art gallery.

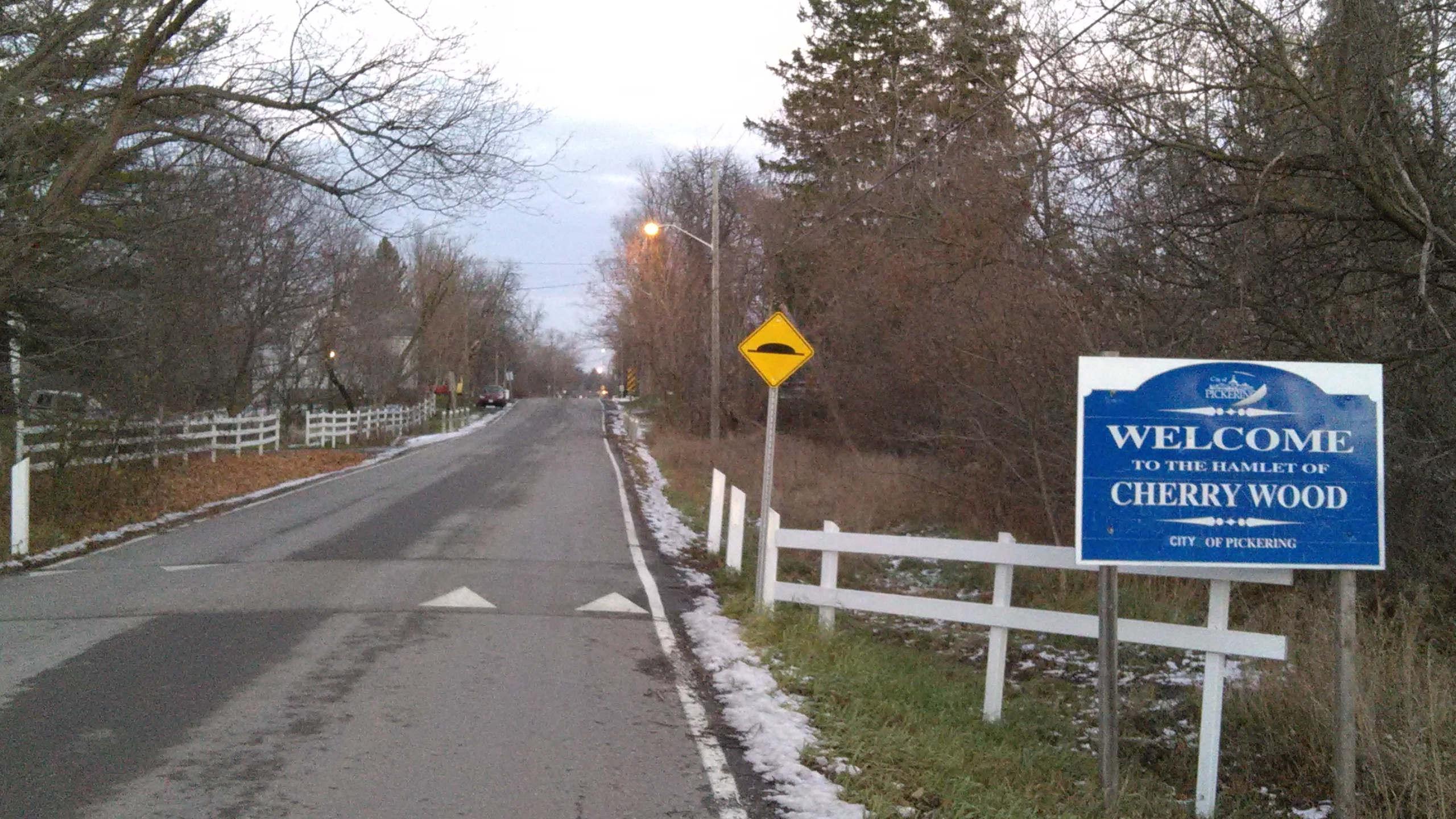
Cherrywood

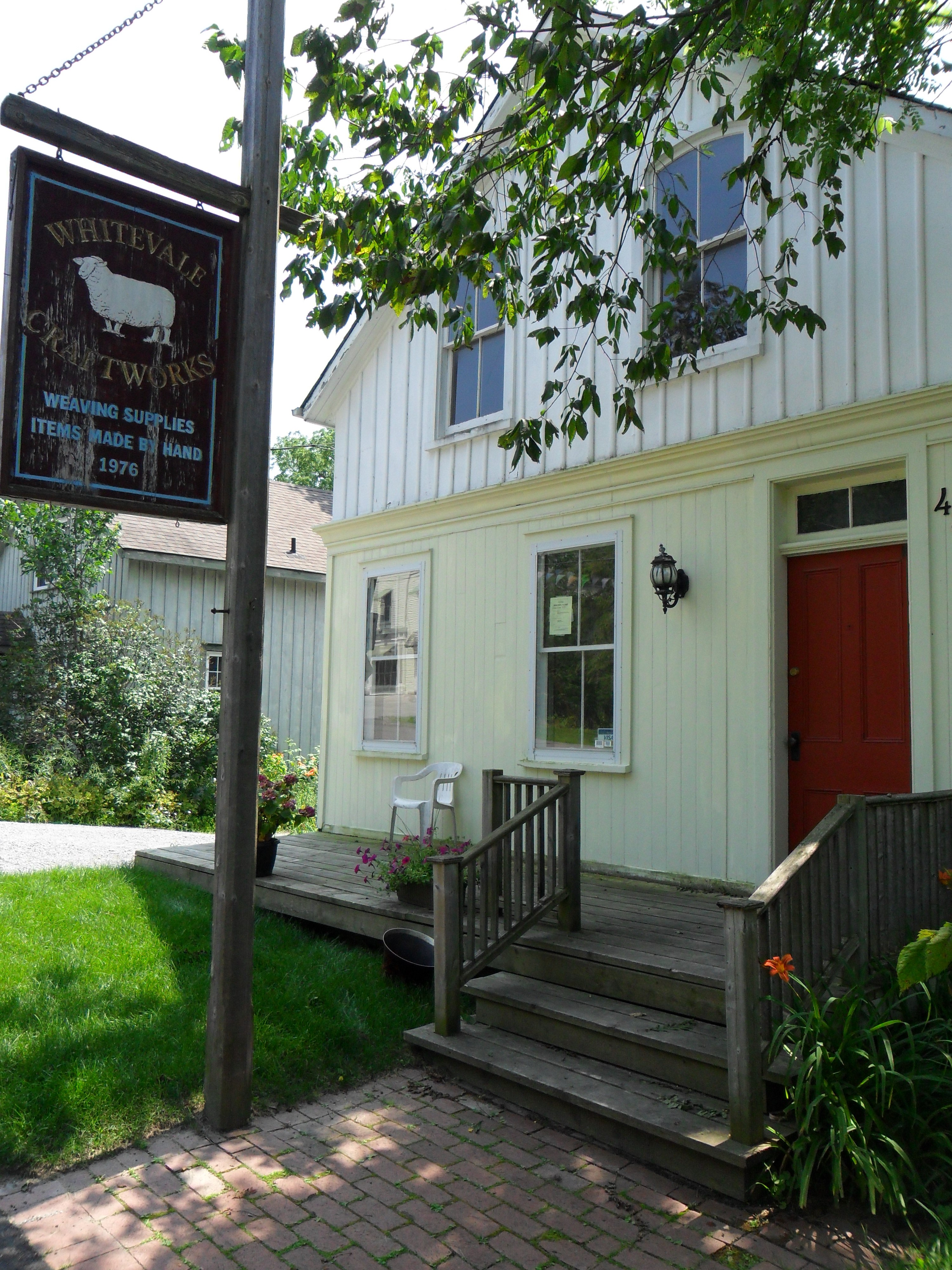
Whitevale Craftworks Store

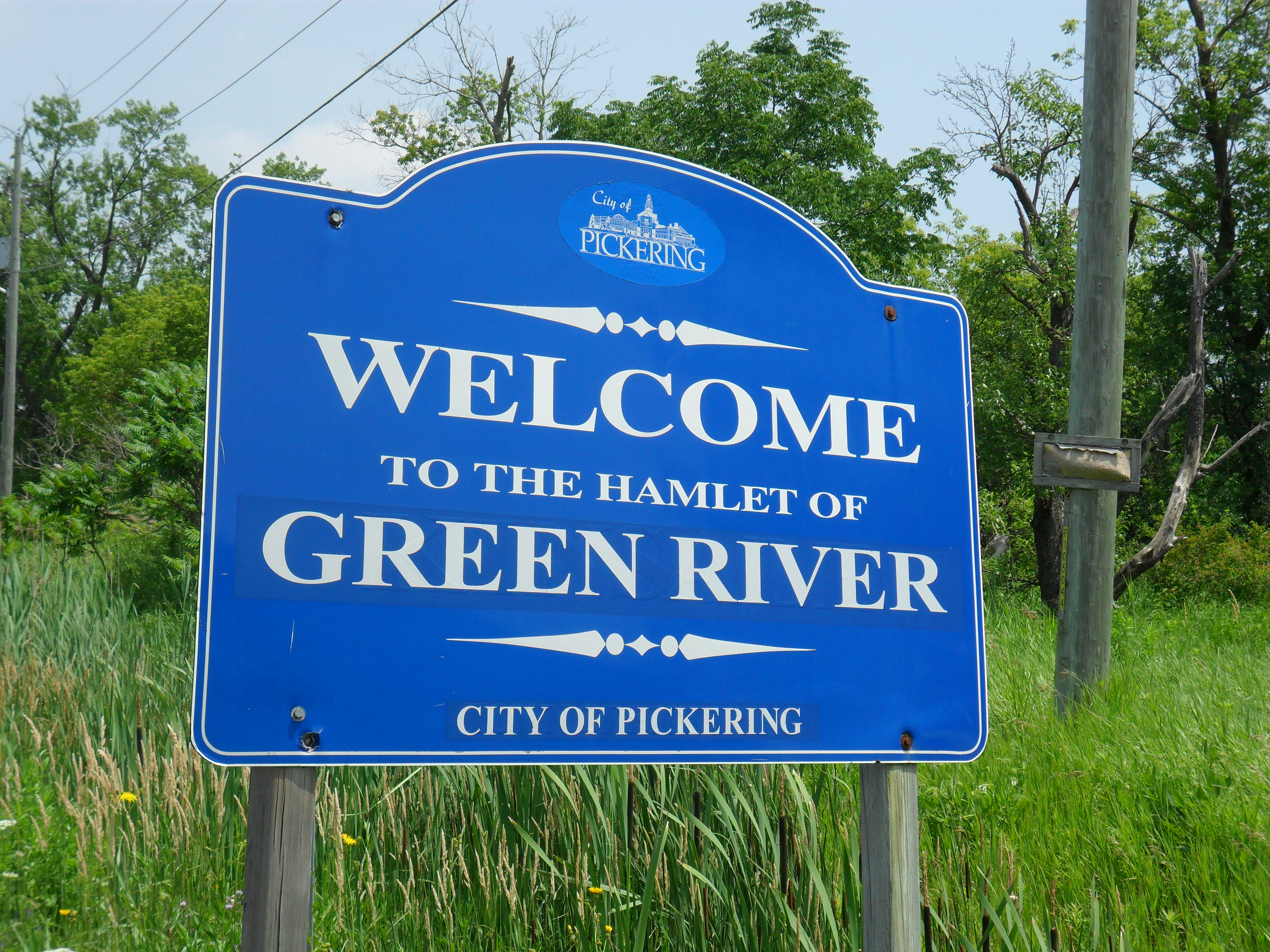
Green River

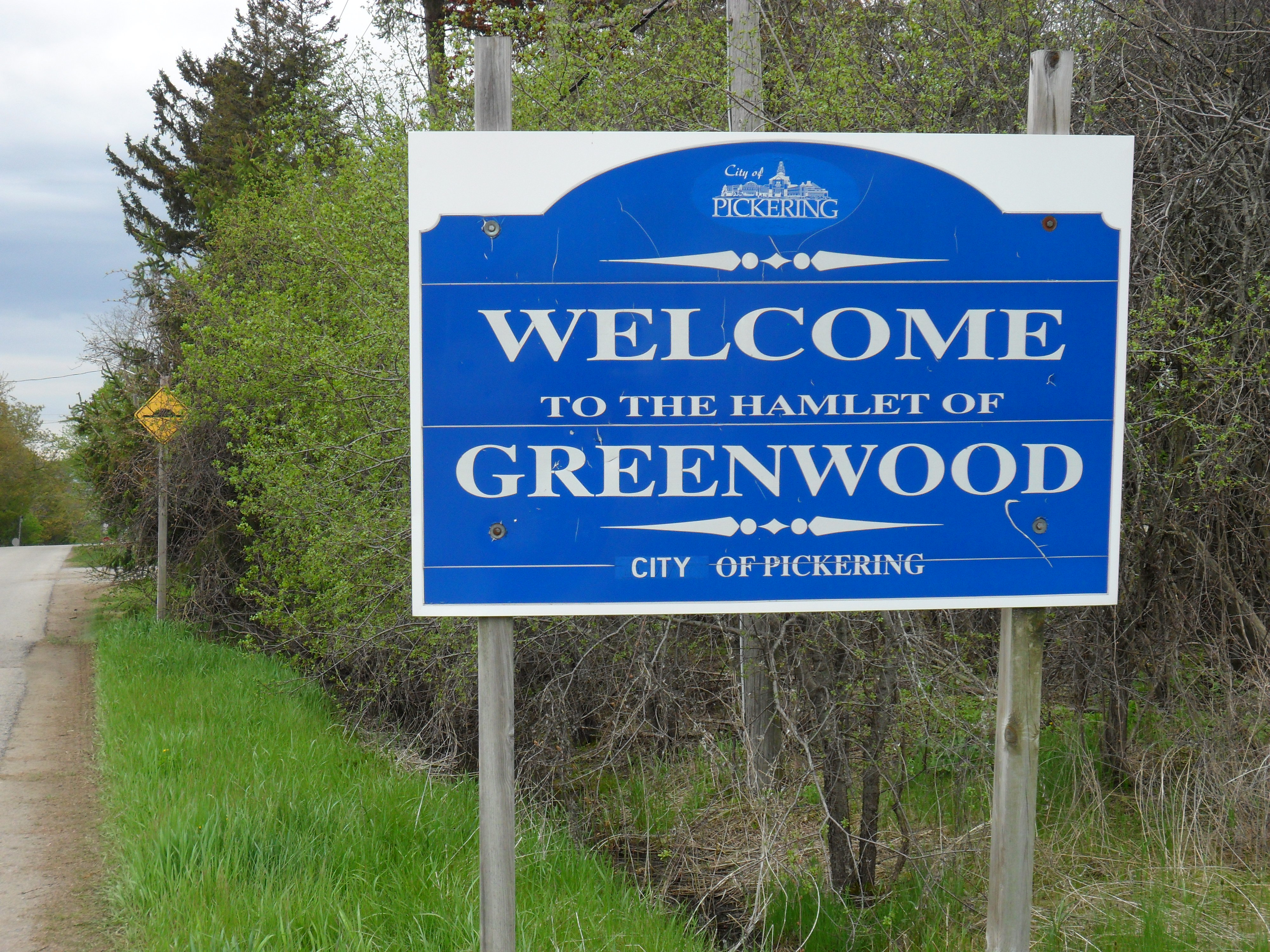
Country road to Greenwood

Interactive map of Pickering's urban neighbourhoods

The city is divided into following neighbourhoods:

- South Urban Pickering
  - Rosebank
  - West Shore
  - Bay Ridges
  - Brock Industrial
  - Rougemount
  - Woodlands
  - Dunbarton
  - City Centre
  - Village East, the eastern part of the former Pickering Village municipality
  - Highbush
  - Amberlea
  - Brock Ridge
  - Liverpool
  - Rouge Park
  - Duffin Heights
- Seaton Urban Area
  - Lamoureaux
  - Brock-Taunton
  - Mount Pleasant
  - Wilson Meadows
  - Thompson's Corners
  - Innovation Corridor
- Rural Pickering
  - Claremont & Area
  - Greenwood, Kinsale & Estate Residential Clusters
  - Other Rural Area

== Demographics ==
Historical populations
Year	Pop.	±%
1813	180	—
1981	37,754	+20874.4%
1991	68,831	+82.3%
1996	78,989	+14.8%
2001	87,139	+10.3%
2006	87,838	+0.8%
2011	88,721	+1.0%
2016	91,771	+3.4%
2021	99,186	+8.1%

In the 2021 Census of Population conducted by Statistics Canada, Pickering had a population of 99,186 living in 33,425 of its 34,327 total private dwellings, a change of 8.1% from its 2016 population of 91,771. With a land area of 231.1 km^{2} (89.2 sq mi), it had a population density of 429.2/km^{2} (1,111.6/sq mi) in 2021.

The city has estimated that by 2031, Pickering will be home to 131,608 residents.

In 2021, 16.5% of the population was under 15 years of age, and 16.6% was 65 years and over. The median age in Pickering was 40.8 years.

Immigrants made up 36.3% of the population in 2021. The top places of birth of the immigrant population were India (11.2%), Sri Lanka (8.2%), Pakistan (7.9%), Philippines (7.5%), Jamaica (7.2%), the United Kingdom (7.0%), Guyana (6.6%), Trinidad and Tobago (3.7%), China (2.7%), Bangladesh (2.5%), Afghanistan (2.4%), and the United States (1.7%).

The median total income of households in 2020 for Pickering was $118,000.

=== Ethnicity ===
As per the 2021 census, the most common ethnic origins in Pickering are English (14.0%), Irish (11.5%), Scottish (11.0%), Canadian (10.6%), Indian (9.6%), Italian (5.6%), German (5.0%), Jamaican (4.3%), Filipino (4.3%), Chinese (3.9%), British Isles (3.6%), Pakistani (3.5%), Sri Lankan (3.3%), and French (3.3%). Indigenous people made up 1.1% of the population, mostly First Nations (0.5%) and Métis (0.5%).

Panethnic groups in the City of Pickering (2001−2021)
Panethnic group	2021		2016		2011		2006		2001	
Panethnic group	Pop.	%	Pop.	%	Pop.	%	Pop.	%	Pop.	%
European (Note: Statistic includes all persons that did not make up part of a visible minority or an indigenous identity.)	46,395	47.06%	50,875	55.91%	55,940	63.63%	60,075	68.77%	63,340	73.07%
South Asian	20,890	21.19%	13,820	15.19%	9,690	11.02%	7,940	9.09%	6,075	7.01%
African	11,275	11.44%	9,810	10.78%	10,050	11.43%	8,845	10.12%	8,070	9.31%
Southeast Asian (Note: Statistic includes total responses of "Filipino" and "Southeast Asian" under visible minority section on census.)	5,585	5.67%	3,810	4.19%	3,535	4.02%	3,025	3.46%	2,045	2.36%
Middle Eastern (Note: Statistic includes total responses of "West Asian" and "Arab" under visible minority section on census.)	3,700	3.75%	3,100	3.41%	1,665	1.89%	1,410	1.61%	1,010	1.17%
East Asian (Note: Statistic includes total responses of "Chinese", "Korean", and "Japanese" under visible minority section on census.)	3,690	3.74%	3,060	3.36%	2,565	2.92%	2,485	2.84%	2,475	2.86%
Latin American	1,500	1.52%	1,135	1.25%	785	0.89%	655	0.75%	660	0.76%
Indigenous	1,065	1.08%	1,070	1.18%	850	0.97%	600	0.69%	435	0.5%
Other (Note: Statistic includes total responses of "Visible minority, n.i.e." and "Multiple visible minorities" under visible minority section on census.)	5,405	5.48%	4,315	4.74%	2,845	3.24%	2,315	2.65%	2,580	2.98%
Total responses	98,585	99.39%	90,995	99.15%	87,920	99.1%	87,360	99.46%	86,685	99.48%
Total population	99,186	100%	91,771	100%	88,721	100%	87,838	100%	87,139	100%

- Note: Totals greater than 100% due to multiple origin responses.

=== Religion ===
In 2021, 53.7% of the population identified as Christian, with Catholics (25.7%) making up the largest denomination, followed by Anglican (3.9%), Orthodox (3.8%), United Church (3.0%), and other denominations. 23.2% of the population reported no religious affiliation. Others identified as Muslim (12.6%), Hindu (8.3%), Sikh (0.8%), Buddhist (0.5%), and with other religions.

=== Language ===
The 2021 census found English to be the mother tongue of 69.2% of the population. This was followed by Urdu (3.1%), Tamil (3.0%), Tagalog (1.8%), Arabic (1.2%), Spanish (1.1%), French (1.1%), Italian (1.0%), Gujarati (1.0%), Dari (0.9%), Mandarin (0.8%), and Cantonese (0.8%). Of the official languages, 98.6% of the population reported knowing English and 7.3% French.

== Economy ==
Pickering is home to the Pickering Nuclear Generating Station, an eight-reactor facility with a capacity of 4,120 megawatts. The first station, Pickering A, opened with four reactors in 1971. Ontario Power Generation, the plants' operator, is the largest single employer in the city. In 2001, the wind-powered OPG 7 Commemorative Turbine was opened on the generating station site. The nuclear power plant is expected to start decommissioning in 2024.

A number of manufacturers are also located in the city. Major employers include Yorkville Sound (audio equipment), the Canadian headquarters of Purdue Pharma (pharmaceuticals and health & beauty products), Hubbell Canada (electrical equipment), PSB Speakers – Lenbrook (stereo equipment) and Eco-Tec Inc. (industrial water purification and chemical recovery systems).

Pickering is a founding member of the Durham Strategic Energy Alliance or DSEA. The nucleus of the DSEA is primarily Pickering businesses, such as Ontario Power Generation, Veridian, Siemens/Trench, Tetra Tech WEI, AECL, Intellimeter, Areva and Eco-Tec Inc.

Other notable organizations with headquarters in Pickering include: Municipal Property Assessment Corporation. MPAC performs value assessment for property tax purposes for all municipalities in Ontario. In 2012 Search Engine People, Canada's largest Internet-marketing company, moved to Pickering's downtown. The International Institute of Business Analysis is also headquartered in Pickering.

In 2013, the Region of Durham released its Business Count (Employment Survey), which indicated that Pickering has the most jobs amongst Durham Region municipalities, with 29,000+ positions. This figure represents a near 1/3 ratio of jobs to residents.

With the implementation of Seaton and downtown intensification, the Province of Ontario's planning anticipates the creation of 40,000 new jobs for Pickering over the next two decades.

Pickering has planned a downtown intensification program, which includes new condominium developments around the Pickering GO station and Pickering Town Centre. Pickering Town Centre is a two-story mall located in Pickering. An enclosed pedestrian bridge constructed over the 14 lanes of highway 401 was a recent development that has contributed to Pickering's push for more density downtown. The project Durham Live in south Pickering received approval for construction in 2017.

== Government ==
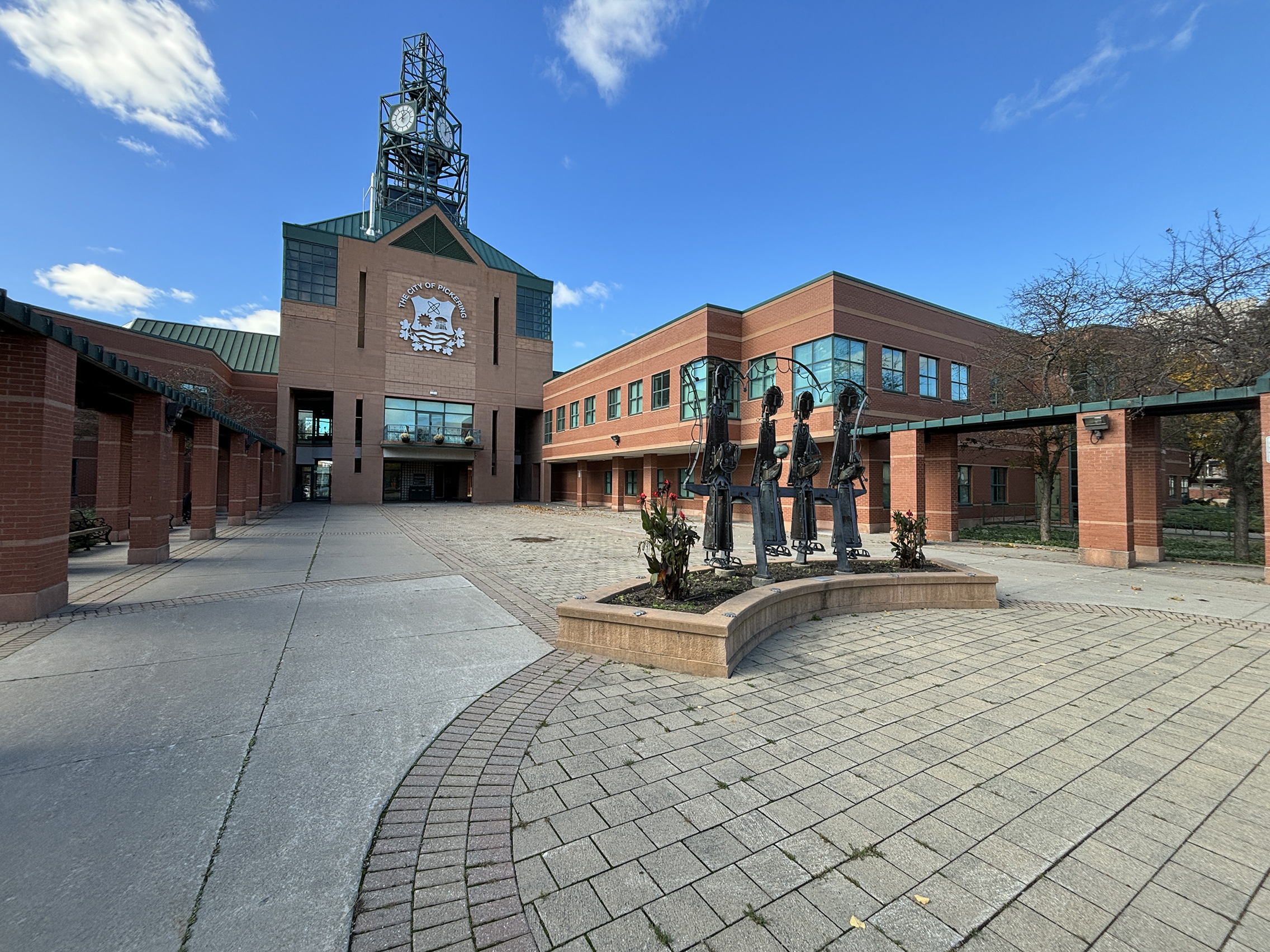
Pickering City Hall Clock Tower

The city council consists of a mayor, three regional councillors, and three city councillors. The mayor and regional councillors sit on the council and also represent the city at Durham Regional Council. The city councillors sit on city council only. Pickering is divided into three wards of roughly equal population, with one city councillor and one regional councillor elected to represent each ward, in what are known as single-member districts.

The current mayor, Kevin Ashe, has held the mayoralty since 2022.

== Transportation ==
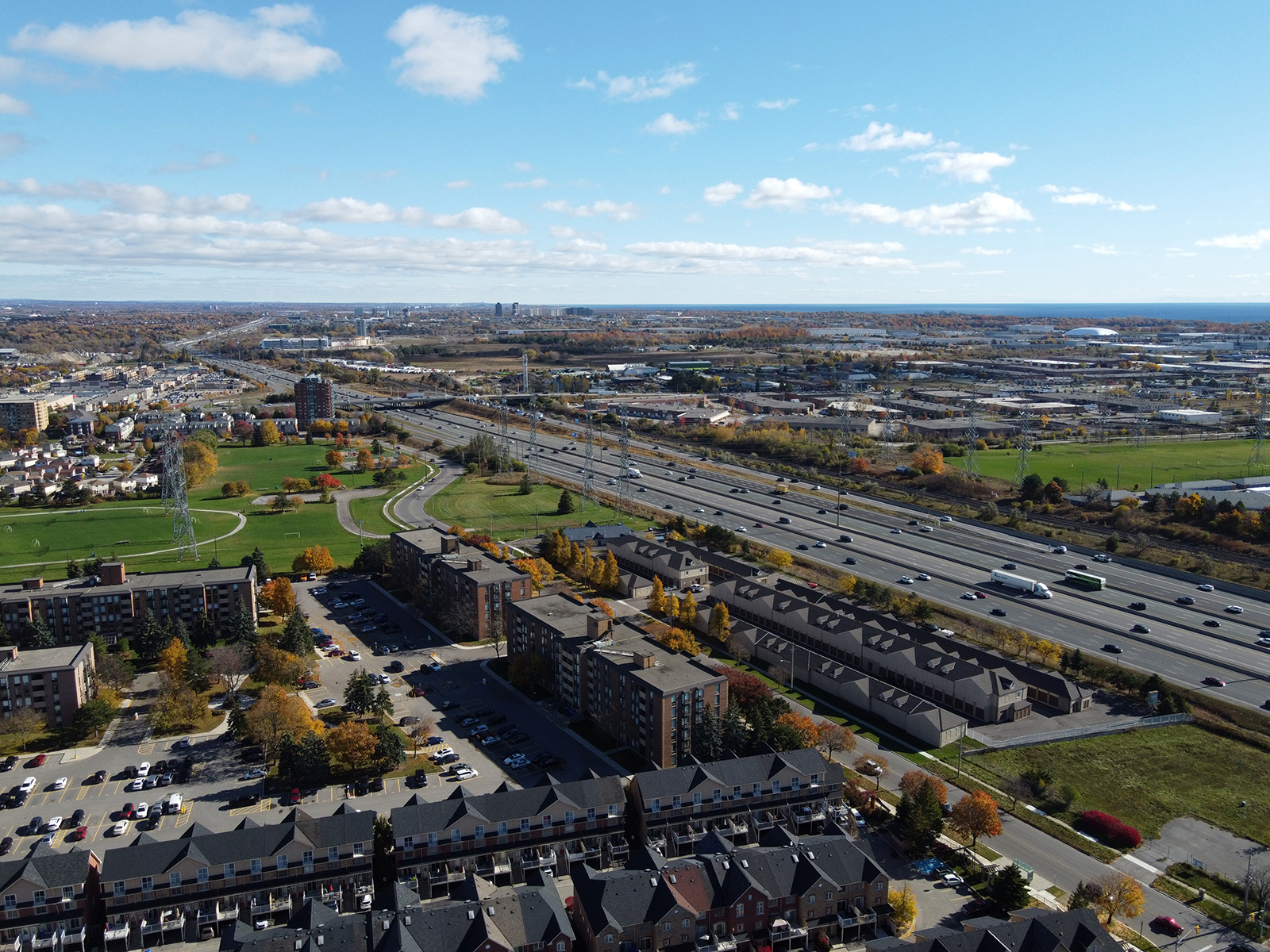
Highway 401 in Pickering

Transit service began in Pickering with the Bay Shores dial-a-bus, which began in 1970–1973. In 2001 Pickering Transit merged with former Ajax Transit to form the Ajax-Pickering Transit Authority (APTA). In 2006, the regional transit system Durham Region Transit took over operations in the Durham Regional Municipality.

The Pickering GO station offers public rail transit on an east–west axis. In 2012, Pickering's landmark bridge opened – connecting the Pickering GO station to the city's downtown core.

Durham Regional Roads serve the city, north and south. Highway 401 runs near the south end of Pickering and Highway 407 ETR runs through the mid-north of the city.

Pickering Airport was a planned second major airport for the Greater Toronto Area. Lands were expropriated in north Pickering in 1972 but the plan was stopped. As of January 2025, the federal government formally cancelled all plans for the Pickering Airport and is now in the process of transferring the majority of the remaining lands to Rouge National Urban Park.

== Infrastructure ==
=== Emergency services ===
Police services in Pickering are provided by the Durham Regional Police from a division office located in the eastern section of the city. Officers from this location also patrol Ajax. Pickering Fire Services operates from four stations with a force of all full-time firefighters. Claremont Fire Hall is now fully staffed by full-time firefighters 24 hours a day, seven days a week. Ambulance/emergency medical services are provided by Durham Region.

== Education ==
Pickering is served by the Durham District School Board, the Durham Catholic District School Board, the Conseil scolaire Viamonde and the Conseil scolaire de district catholique Centre-Sud. As of early 2007, the public board operates 17 elementary schools and two secondary schools, Dunbarton High School and Pine Ridge Secondary School (Pickering High School was previously located in Pickering, but was transferred to Ajax when the city boundaries were changed). The Catholic board runs eight elementary schools and one secondary school, Saint Mary Catholic Secondary School. The French public school board operates École Ronald-Marion, which serves both elementary and secondary students.

Blaisdale Montessori School, a private school chain, has several locations throughout Pickering serving children from preschool age to grade 8. There is also a private elementary and junior high school there called Montessori Learning Centre. Also serving the Durham Region is Durham Secondary Academy and Middle School, an inspected private high school and middle school for grades 5 to 12.

In September 2012, the Durham College/Centennial College Joint Learning Site opened at the north terminus of the pedestrian bridge. The Joint Learning Site offers primarily graduate certificate programs, with a number of complementary courses and classes. At the time of its opening, it was the only public post-secondary institution in the Province of Ontario with a direct connection to public transit.

== Gallery ==
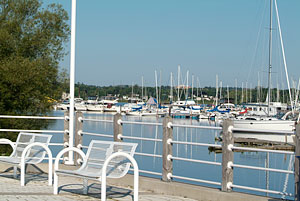
Boats and benches by Frenchman's Bay by Millennium Square

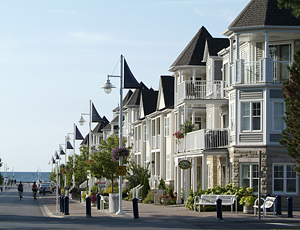
Nautical Village

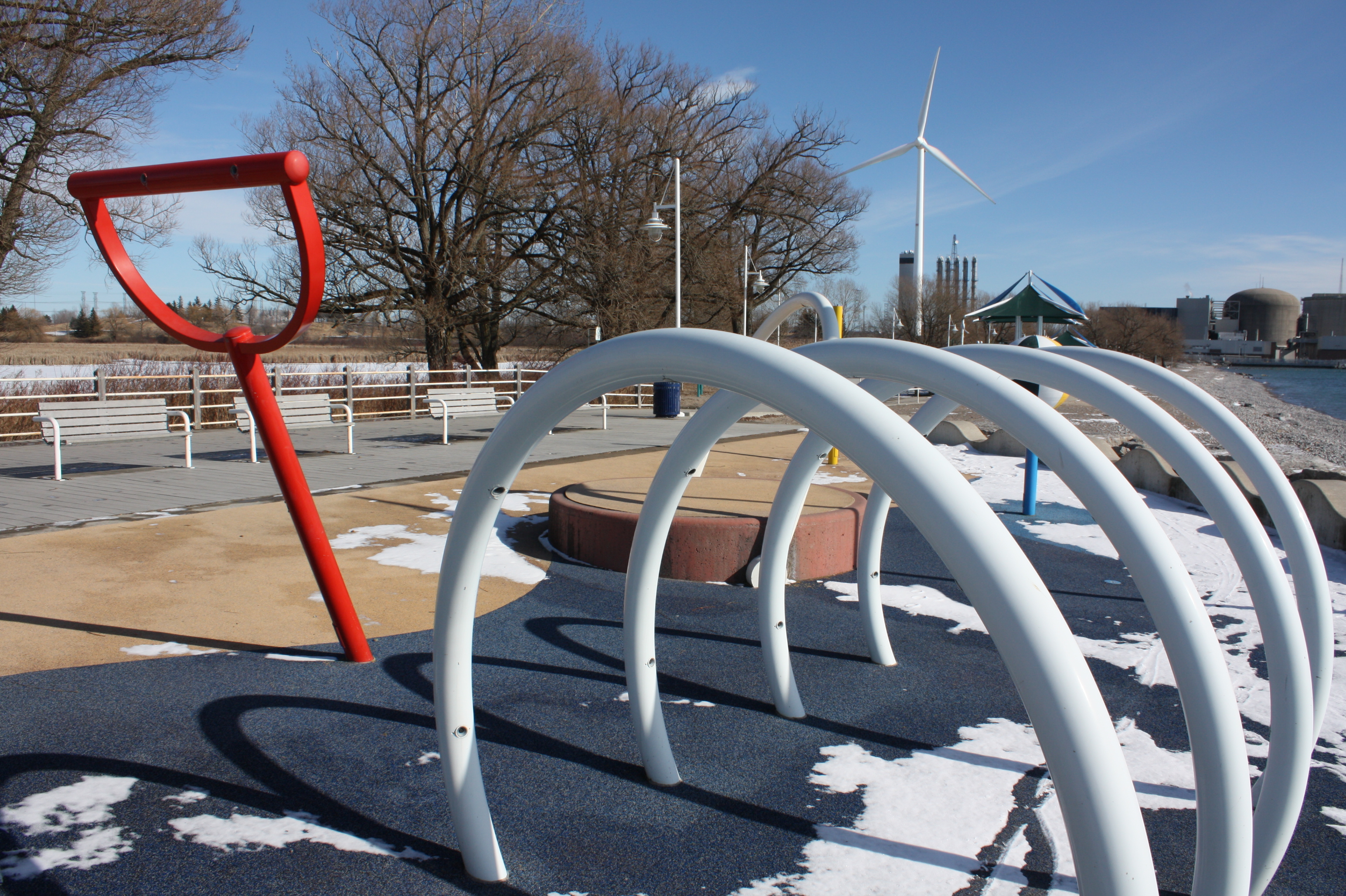
Wind Turbine and Pickering Nuclear Plant from Beachfront Park

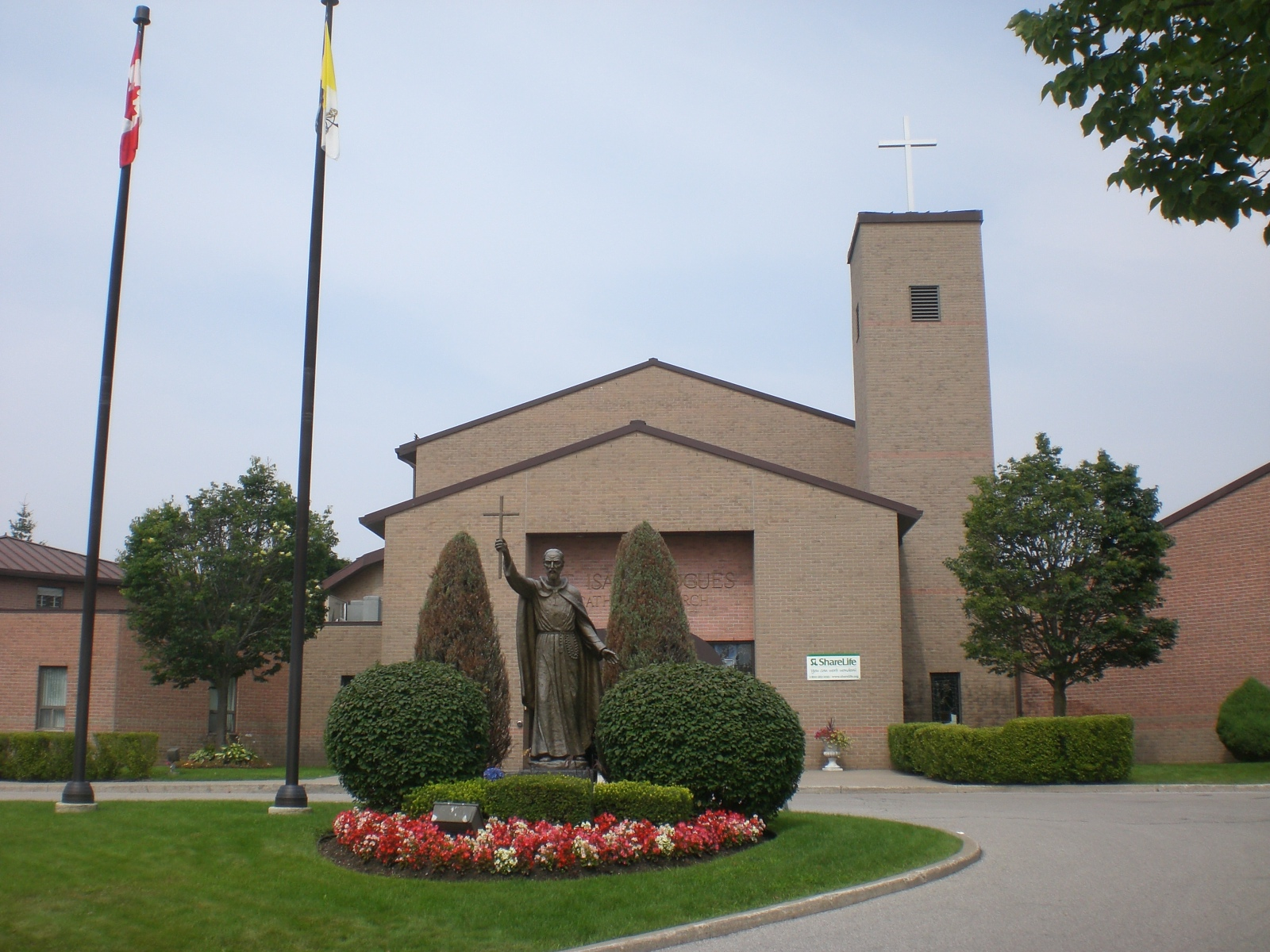
St. Isaac Jogues Church on Finch Avenue

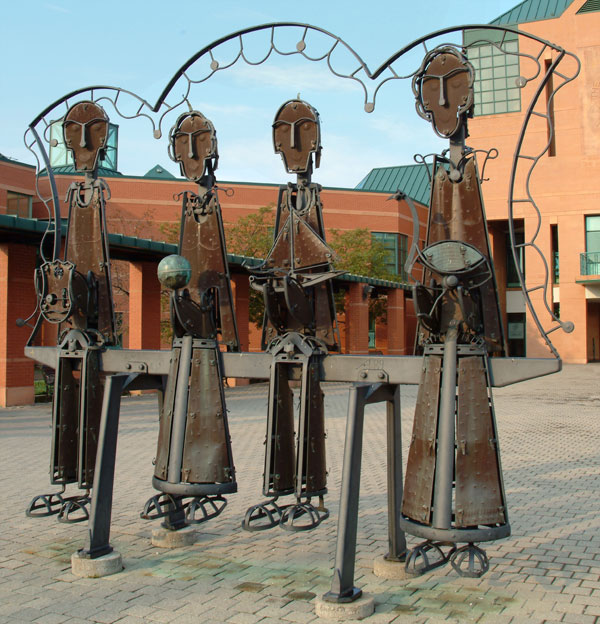
Pickering Pioneer Family by Andreas Drenters

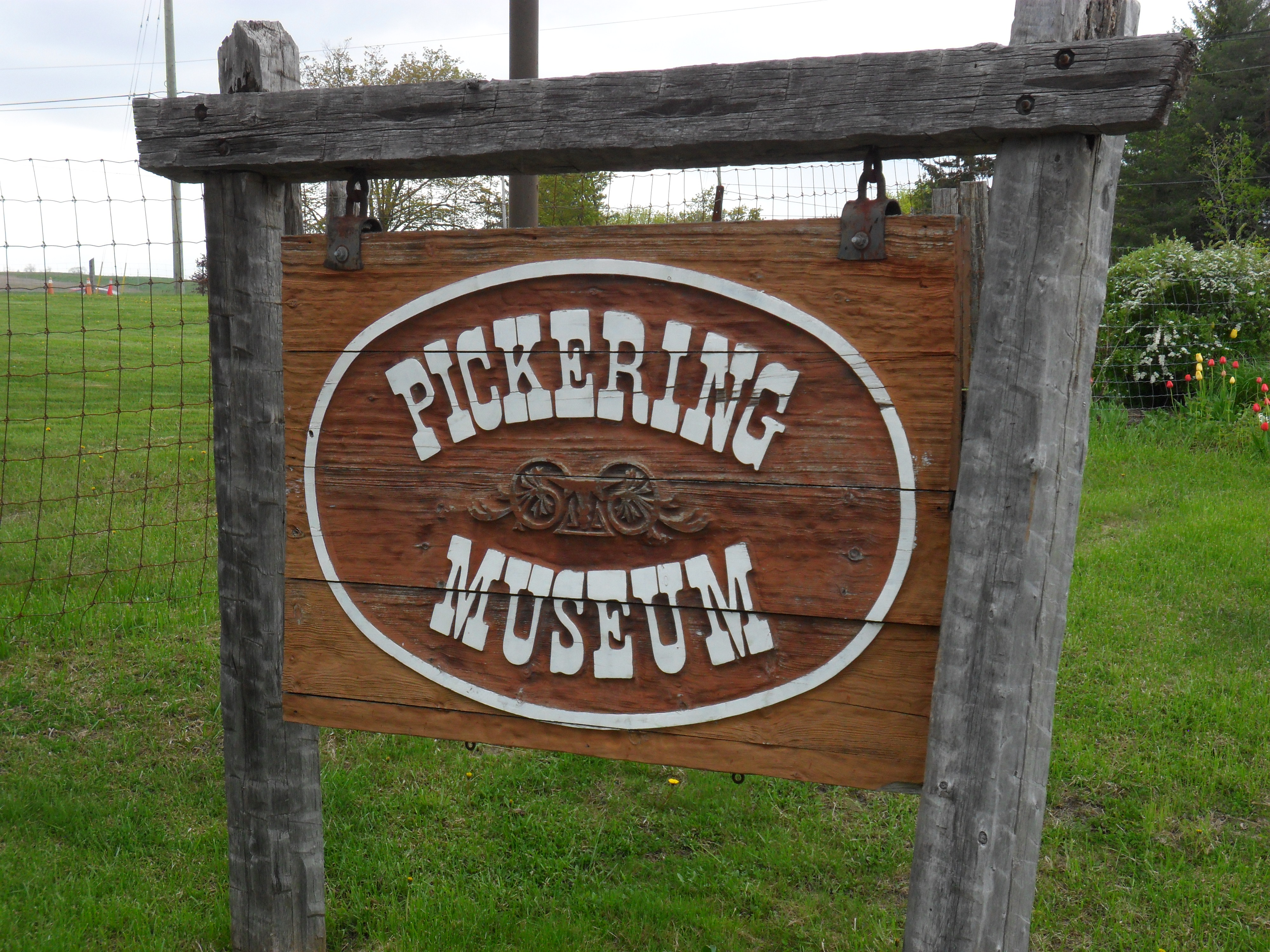
Pickering Museum

== Notable people ==
- Andy Andreoff, NHL player
- Bromley Armstrong, civil rights activist
- Sean Avery, former NHL forward
- Shelley-Ann Brown, Olympic silver medalist
- Drake Caggiula, NHL player
- Yannick Carter, Canadian Football League linebacker and special teams player
- Glenn Clark, former National Lacrosse League player and former head coach of the Toronto Rock
- Ernie Coombs, children's entertainer, better known as Mr. Dressup
- Laura Creavalle, Guyanese-born Canadian/American professional bodybuilder
- Ilona Duczynska, Polish-Hungarian communist revolutionary, active in Hungary, Austria, England and Canada
- Perdita Felicien, Olympic track and field athlete
- Dale Goldhawk, journalist and consumer rights advocate
- Glenn Healy, former NHL goalie, member of 1994 Stanley Cup Champion New York Rangers
- Kristen Holden-Ried, actor
- Nikkita Holder, Olympic track and field athlete
- Mark Holland, politician
- Craig Hutchison, Olympic swimmer
- Spider Jones, former professional boxer, media/radio personality
- Cory Joseph, NBA player for the Detroit Pistons
- Sheri Kershaw, Canadian musician, singer and songwriter
- Jonathan Langdon, actor
- Andrea Lewis, singer, actor and songwriter
- Manafest, Christian rap rock musician
- Shawn Mendes, singer and songwriter
- Caroline Nichols Churchill, American feminist, author, and editor
- Denis T. O'Connor, former Roman Catholic archbishop of Toronto
- Daniel David Palmer, the founder of chiropractic
- Griffen Palmer, country music singer-songwriter
- Paul Peschisolido, professional soccer player who played in England as a striker and was the Manager of Burton Albion F.C.
- Jaime Peters, professional soccer player who plays midfield for Ipswich Town in the United Kingdom
- Karl Polanyi, professor of economics at Columbia University and author of The Great Transformation
- Tony Sharpe, Olympic bronze medalist in the 4 x 100 metre relay at the 1984 Summer Olympics
- Kailen Sheridan, soccer goalkeeper for the Canada women's team
- Sarah Slean, singer
- Tyler Stewart, Barenaked Ladies drummer/singer
- Chris Van Vliet, journalist
- Bree Williamson, actress best known for her role as Jessica Buchanan on soap opera One Life to Live
- Neil Young, rock singer-songwriter, lived in Pickering in his youth

== Culture ==
=== Public art ===
The City of Pickering maintains a significant collection of public art, focusing on kinetic and interactive installations that celebrate the region's heritage and environment. A central feature of this collection is the work of sculptor Geordie Lishman, who has created several landmark pieces for the city:

- Spirit of Pickering (2020): Located in Esplanade Park, this series of four stainless-steel kinetic sculptures by Geordie Lishman includes the figures Gather, Inspire, Live, and Work. Each sculpture is interactive; for example, Gather features a rotating head that rings chimes, while Inspire includes a large internal chime rung by moving the figure's "dress."
- Gordon's Guitar (2025): Commissioned by the city and created by Geordie Lishman, this interactive sculpture in Ernie Stroud Park serves as a tribute to music legend Gordon Lightfoot. The 4-metre-tall, 12-string guitar is modeled after Lightfoot's own instrument and features a butterfly motif as a nod to the Mariposa Folk Festival.

Other notable public works in Pickering include:

- Millennium Mast: A 12-metre-high kinetic sculpture by Lynda and Ron Baird at Millennium Square. It features pivoting sails that rotate with the wind, representing the white pine masts historically used by the British Royal Navy.
- The P-Sculpture: A stylized "P" located at the city's western gateway, serving as a landmark for commuters entering from the Greater Toronto Area.
- Column of Liberty: A cenotaph in Esplanade Park that serves as the city's primary war memorial for Remembrance Day services.

=== Historical landmarks and institutions ===
- Pickering Museum Village: Located in the hamlet of Greenwood, it is the largest living history museum in Durham Region, featuring 19 heritage buildings dating back to 1810.
- Pickering Public Library: The city's central library system, with its main branch located in the City Centre, serves as a community hub for local arts and educational programming.

=== Festivals and events ===
- Artfest Pickering: An annual juried art show held each May in Esplanade Park, featuring over 90 artists and artisans from across Ontario.
- Pickering Dragon Boat Festival: A major annual regatta held at Frenchman's Bay, attracting hundreds of athletes and thousands of spectators to the waterfront.

== In popular culture ==
=== Film ===
- The 1957 CBC/Hollywood production of the classic television show Hawkeye and the Last of the Mohicans was filmed in Pickering. A farm at the corner of Valley Farm Rd. and 3rd Concession, owned by Arthur Gottlieb, was the setting for the 25-episode series.
- The 1979 film The Black Stallion was shot at a farm on Sideline 34 in north Pickering near Altona.
- The Canadian television show Paradise Falls' first season was filmed in the village of Whitevale, as was David Cronenberg's film The Dead Zone.
- The 1994 comedy The Ref, with Denis Leary and Kevin Spacey, was filmed in part at Port Pickering Marina, on Frenchman's Bay.
- The 1995 family/adventure film Salt Water Moose, starring Timothy Dalton and Lolita Davidovitch, was filmed in and around Frenchman's Bay.
- The 1998 comedy/action film The Big Hit, with Mark Wahlberg, Lou Diamond Phillips, Avery Brooks, Christina Applegate and Elliott Gould, was partly filmed in Pickering near Petticoat Creek.
- The 2003 two-part mini-series Lives of the Saints, based on Nino Ricci's award-winning trilogy co-starring Sophia Loren, filmed scenes on a farm just north of Pickering.
- Pickering Museum Village has been used as a setting in Road to Avonlea, Little Men, and the films Anne of Green Gables and Lantern Hill.
- The final scene in Boondock Saints 2: All Saints' Day was filmed in Pickering.

=== TV ===
- A television adaptation of Jack Reacher was partially filmed in North Pickering

== See also ==
- List of townships in Ontario

== Literature ==
- Wood, William Robertson (1911). Past years in Pickering: Sketches of the History of the Community. Retrieved at the website "Our Roots – Nos Racines", University of Calgary/Université Laval.
