= Whitevale, Ontario =

Whitevale Majorville
- Community (hamlet)
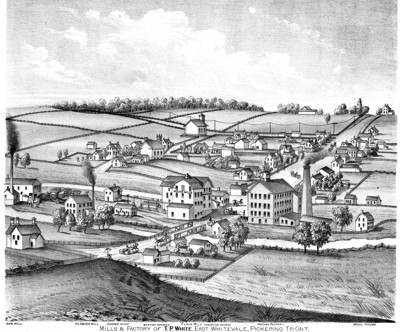
- Whitevale, 1877
- Coordinates: 43°53′18″N 79°9′32″W
- Country: Canada
- Province: Ontario
- Regional municipality: Durham
- City: Pickering
- Established: 1820s

Population (2016)
  - Total: 255
- Time zone: UTC-5 (EST)
  - Summer (DST): UTC-4 (EDT)
- Forward sortation area: L0H 1M0
- Area codes: 905 and 289
- NTS Map: 030M15
- GNBC Code: FDPDS
- Website: whitevale.ca

Whitevale, formerly Majorville, is a community located within the City of Pickering in Durham Region, Ontario, Canada. The city refers to the community as the "Hamlet of Whitevale".

== History ==
Whitevale was an excellent example of nineteenth-century industry concentrating by a power source and then expanding of its own accord.

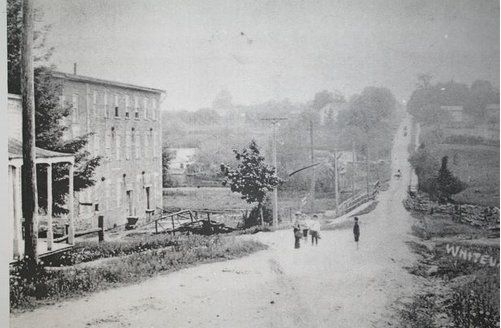
Whitevale Road (formerly Main Street), 1900

=== Settlement ===
The community was first settled in the 1820s when John Major built a sawmill. The community was known as Major or Majorville, because of the mill and the number of Majors who lived close by on the 5th Concession line.

Around 1855 Truman P. White bought the saw mill, built a gristmill and a cooperage; and in 1866 built a planing factory. The community owed so much of its development and business prosperity to T.P. White that in acknowledgement, it adopted Whitevale as its permanent designation.

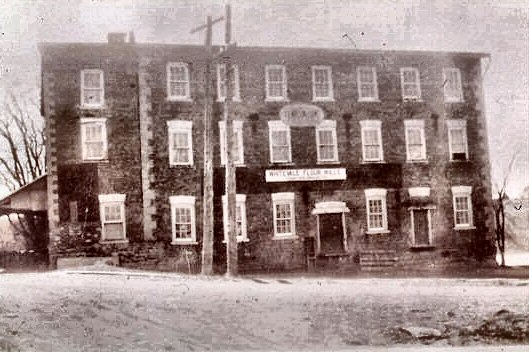
Mill, Est. 1867

=== Growth ===
The newly named community of Whitevale may be said to have had its beginning in the year 1855. In that year Donald McPhee opened the first store and T.P. White erected a grist mill that cost $10,000, which for equipment far surpassed all others in the township at the time. In 1866 he built a large planing mill and in 1867 a large four storey brick woolen mill, that cost about $30,000. The woolen mill was leased and operated for some years by Mr. Ellis, the grist mill in the year 1867 to 1874 by the Spink brothers and the sawmill by the Besse brothers.

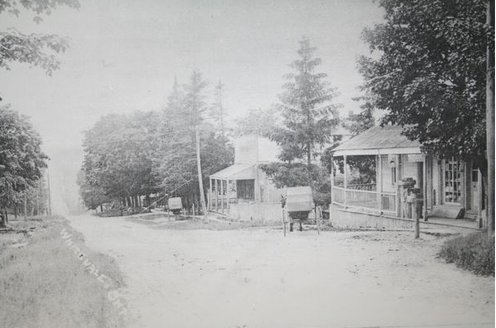
Whitevale Road (formerly Main Street), 1900

=== Prosperous Times ===
Whitevale during these years was a busy place. In 1890 Whitevale contained a stave and heading factory and a barrel factory both owned and operated by the Spink brothers; three general stores, one owned by James Taylor and Donald McPhee; a wagon and carriage factory, operated by the Pollard brothers; a cheese factory, owned and operated by P.R. Hoover and Co.; the merchant and tailoring firm of J. Rose and Son; the shoemaker shops of John Allen and D. Moodey; the butcher shop of Israel Burton and the tinsmith shop of S.B. Wigmore. In addition, Whitevale contained two blacksmiths, two wagon shops, a school house, undertakers, harness shop, grist mill, brush factory, grindstone factory, barber shop, three dressmakers, three gardeners, money order and post offices, hotel, brass band, two churches and four lodges.

=== Important Historical Structures ===
Whitevale Church

The Whitevale Church was built to replace the 1854 Wesleyan Stone Church located behind the present-day cemetery. The Whitevale Church was built as a Methodist Church in 1884 and had its Church Dedication in February 1885 with "congregations overflowing". The church became Whitevale United Church in 1925 with a total congregation of 106 members recorded in 1929.

Whitevale Church

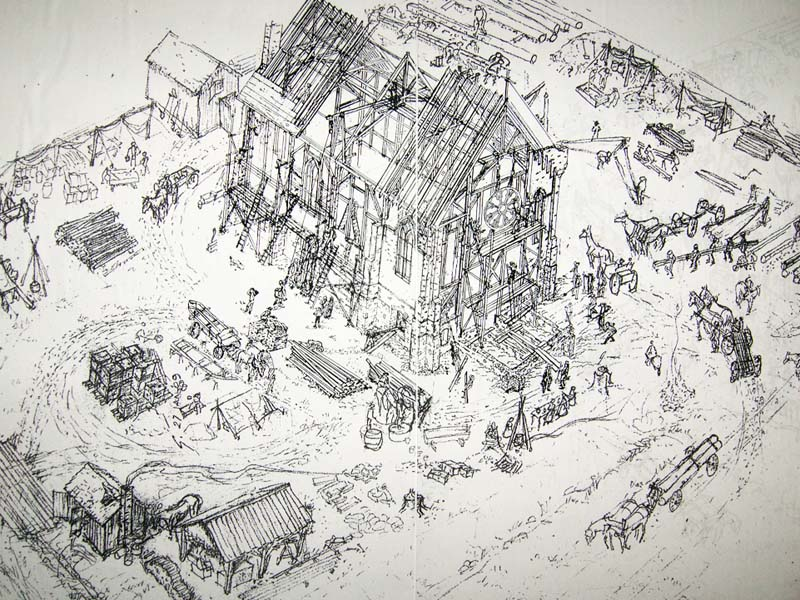
Construction Sketch

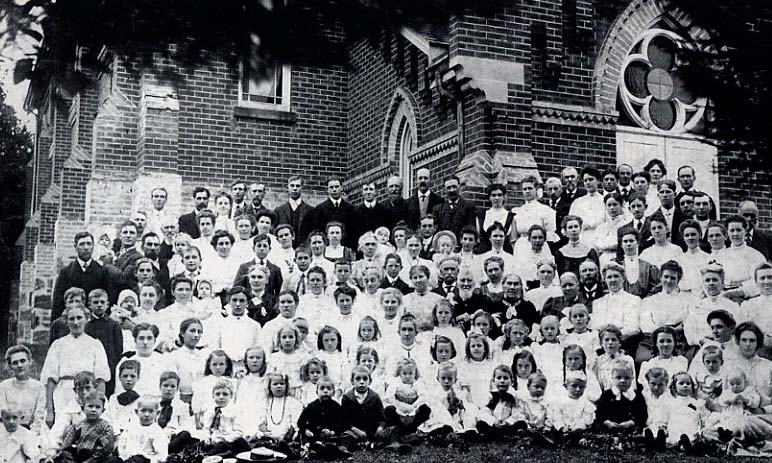
In 1907

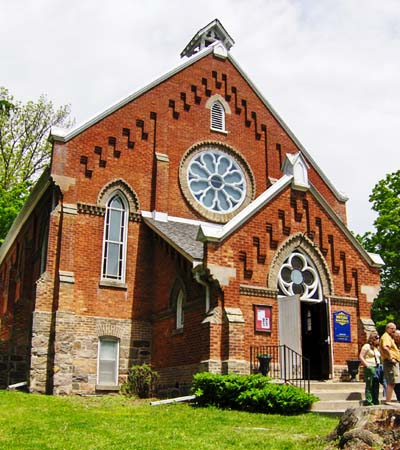
In May 2009

Following the announcement by the Ontario Government in 1972 threatening expropriation for a new airport, many of the congregation moved away. In 2009–2010, the United Church Presbytery put the church up for sale and the Whitevale community came together to try and raise funds to keep the heritage church as part of the community. Recently, the church was purchased and is now a Greek Orthodox Church. As the only remaining church in Whitevale, it remains virtually unaltered and is a very good example of Gothic Revival architecture.

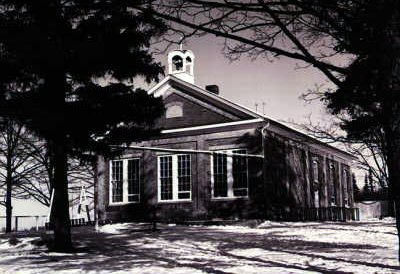
Whitevale School

Construction date: 1865 The Trustees of the School purchased this property in 1864 from James White for $150.00. This new school was to replace the 1842 school building located on the corner of the John Sleigh Farm, Concession 5, Lot 27. The construction of the present building was financed by Truman P. White. The school was used for educational purposes until 1968 when it was closed due to the government policy of regionalizating district schools, it is now a private residence.

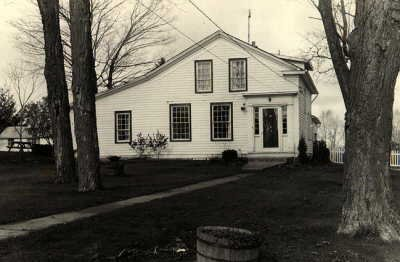
T.P. White's House

Construction date: c. 1850s. Due to its Classical Revival detailing, it is generally felt that the Truman P. White house was built around 1850. The 1861 Census Return notes that T.P.White lived in a 1 1/2-story frame dwelling. Originally the house had a front-gable plan with a side entrance and return eaves detailing on the front facade. A later nineteenth-century addition on the west side of the building gave the structure its present saltbox appearance. The T.P. White house is one of the most important heritage structures in Whitevale.

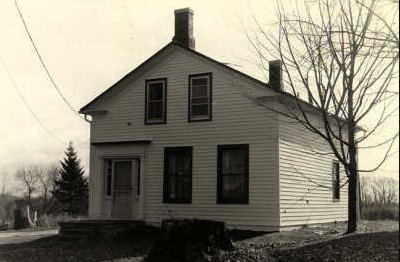
George Gilchrist's House

Construction date: c. 1858 At one time, this house belonged to George Gilchrist, a local planer and later owner of a sash and door factory. It is considered to be one of the more important heritage buildings in Whitevale. Note that this house (located directly across the street from the T.P. White House) was a mirror image (before the addition made onto the T.P White House).

=== Cemetery ===
The Whitevale Cemetery 43.8902°N 79.1434°W was established in 1832. This pioneer cemetery sits just east of the central village on Whitevale Road. The land was donated by Henry Major, son of the first settler, John Major.

The final resting place of the hamlet's name sake Truman P. White, as well as the headstones of the members of the Major family can also be found here. There are also two war graves: William Henry Emsely – a Lieutenant Colonel from World War I and Alfred Frederick Griffin – a Pilot Officer from World War II.

There is a stone lying on the ground of the cemetery which reads "An Unknown Stranger 1854". According to the century-old tale, a man who was passing through Whitevale, decided to stay the night at the Whitevale Hotel. The next day, he was discovered dead with no explanation for his death. He also carried no identification which led the residents of Whitevale having to bury him in the cemetery with a simple plaque.

Whitevale Cemetery

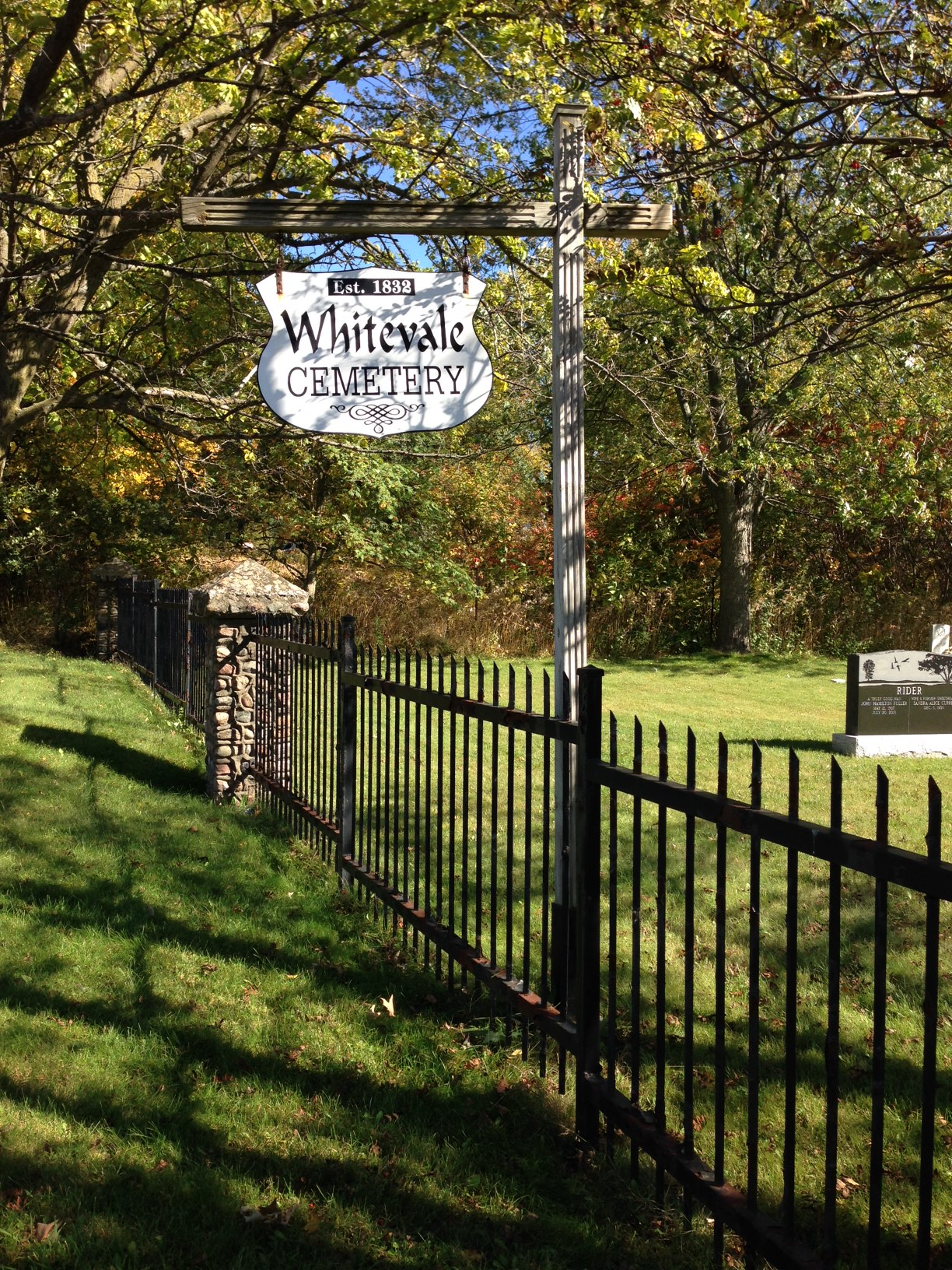

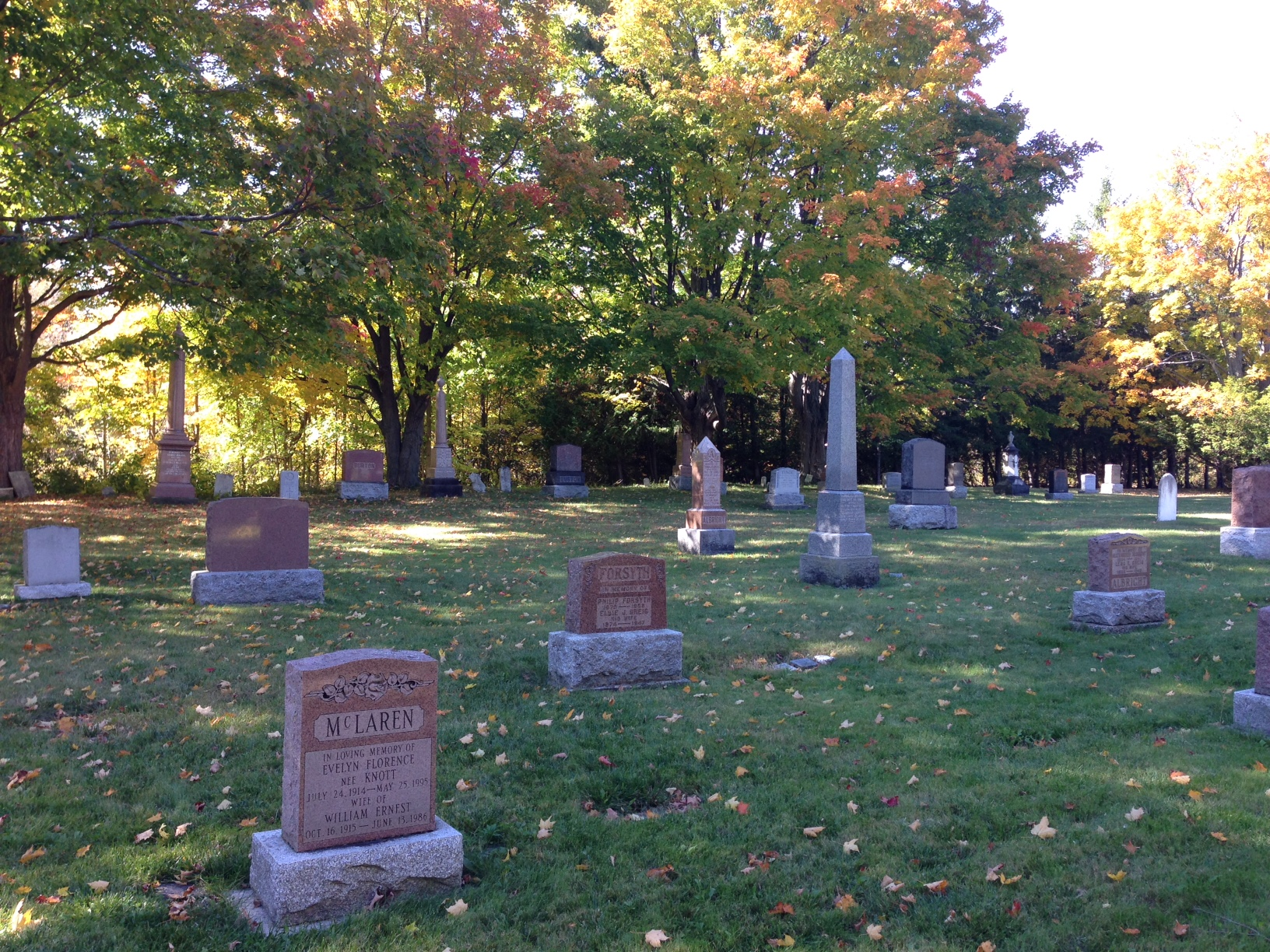

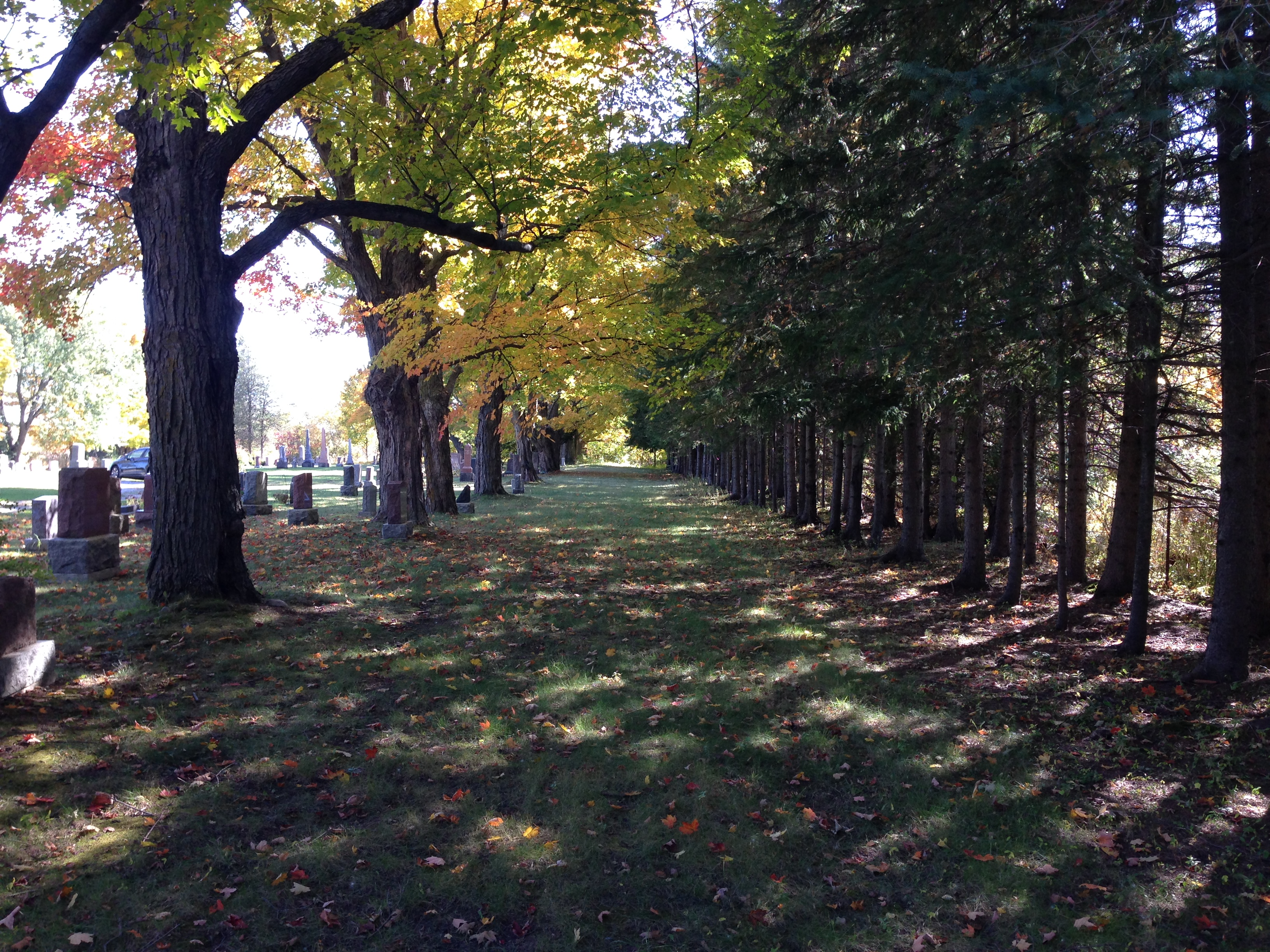

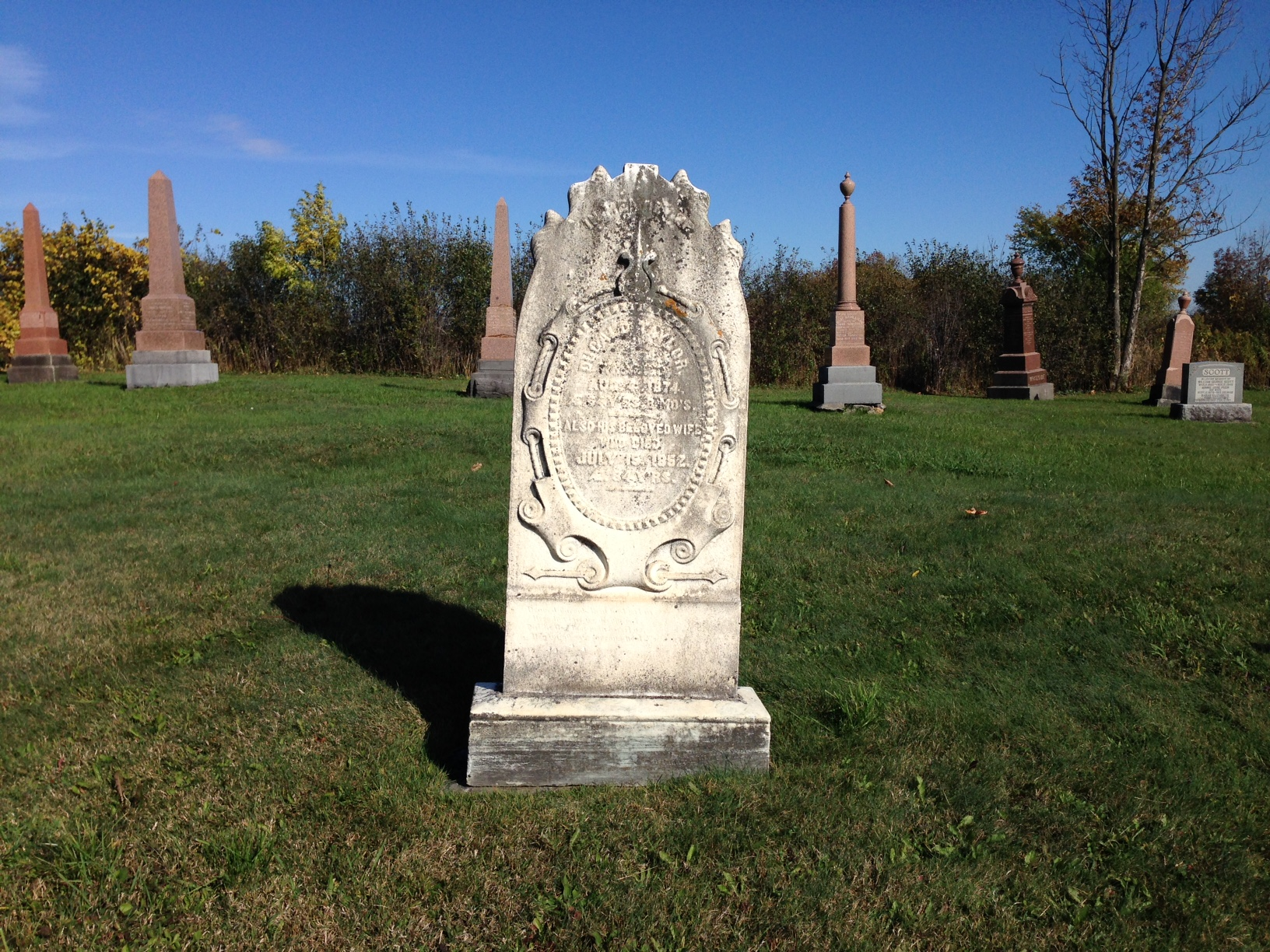

=== Fires ===
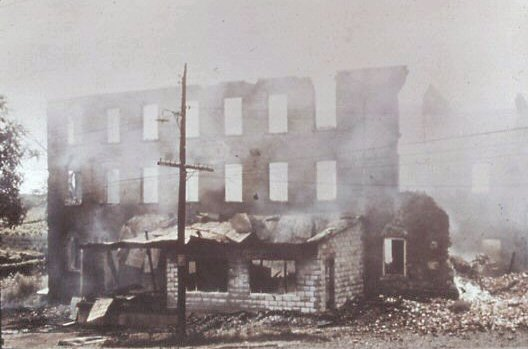
Whitevale Grist Mill Fire, 1961

Fires destroyed many of Whitevale's booming industries and continually changed the face of town. A public hall which had been erected in 1860 was also lost due to fire. A carriage factory and the Cooperage went in 1874. The woolen mill was the next to experience a fire several years later, but the brick walls remained standing. This was later followed by the destruction of the planing mill and the Grist mill, which was then being operated by Mr. White himself. The planing mill was rebuilt on the site of the grist mill and subsequently burned in 1899. The grist mill machinery was rebuilt inside the fire-damaged brick walls of the old woolen mill. A devastating fire leveled the converted grist mill in 1961, but a modern feed mill was erected on the same site in 1962. In early 2011, the Regency Coffee Co. building (which includes a portion of the building that dates back to the 1880s) caught on fire during renovations, but only sustained smoke and roof damage.

=== Floods ===
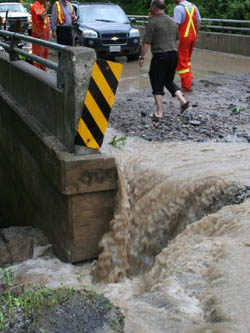
Flooding of Whitevale Bridge in 2008

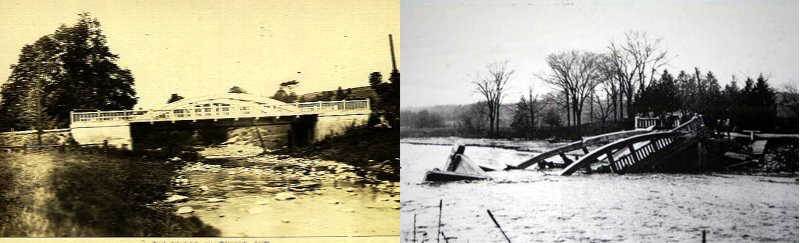
Whitevale Bridge Damage

The Whitevale Bridge has suffered from at least three separate occasions of flooding. In 1929 a heavy flood completely washed out the newly built bridge. In October 1954, the mill dam and the approach to the Whitevale Bridge (not the entire bridge) went out due to Hurricane Hazel when Duffins Creek overflowed. Finally, in July 2008 the concrete bridge suffered minor damage when heavy rains washed out a small section. The previous bridge was demolished in 2014 and replaced by the current structure.

=== Historic Organizations ===
- Lodge No. 282 of the Ancient Order of United Workmen was organized in Whitevale on June 17, 1887. The following were the charter members: George Burton, C.C. Reesor, William Boyd, J. Thornton, William Coakwell, E. Nighswander, S. B. Lynde, John Turner, W.R. Barton, Walter S. Major and A.E. Major. In 1900 the lodge was transferred to Green River.
- Court Pride of the Vale, No. 7144 of the Ancient Order of Foresters was organized on July 26, 1885. The following were the charter members: J. Kirton, J. Ferguson, A. Besse, Dr. W. H. Carleton, Levi Cooper, John Burkholder, S. Pennock, William Lount, S. Mitchell, Robert Birnie, Donald R. Beaton, Fred Fuller and Charles C. Reesor.
- Brougham Lodge No. 155 of the Independent Order of Odd Fellows was instituted in the village of Brougham on January 29, 1875 but was destroyed by a fire in December 1892. In August 1893, a duplicate charter was issued and the lodge moved to Whitevale.

== Present day ==
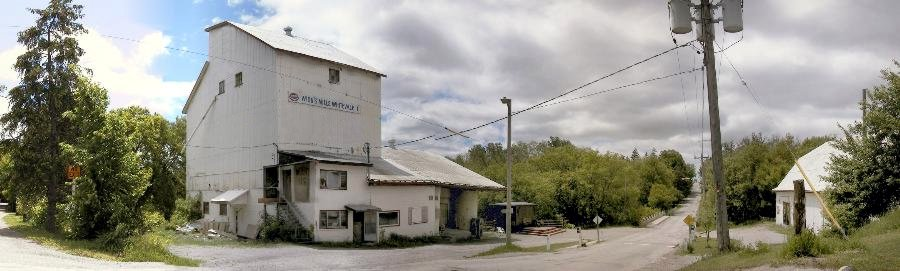
Panoramic view of Whitevale flour mill and bridge.

=== Community Events ===
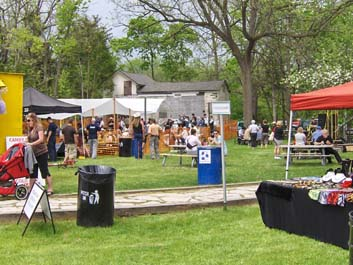
Whitevale Annual Spring Festival, 2009

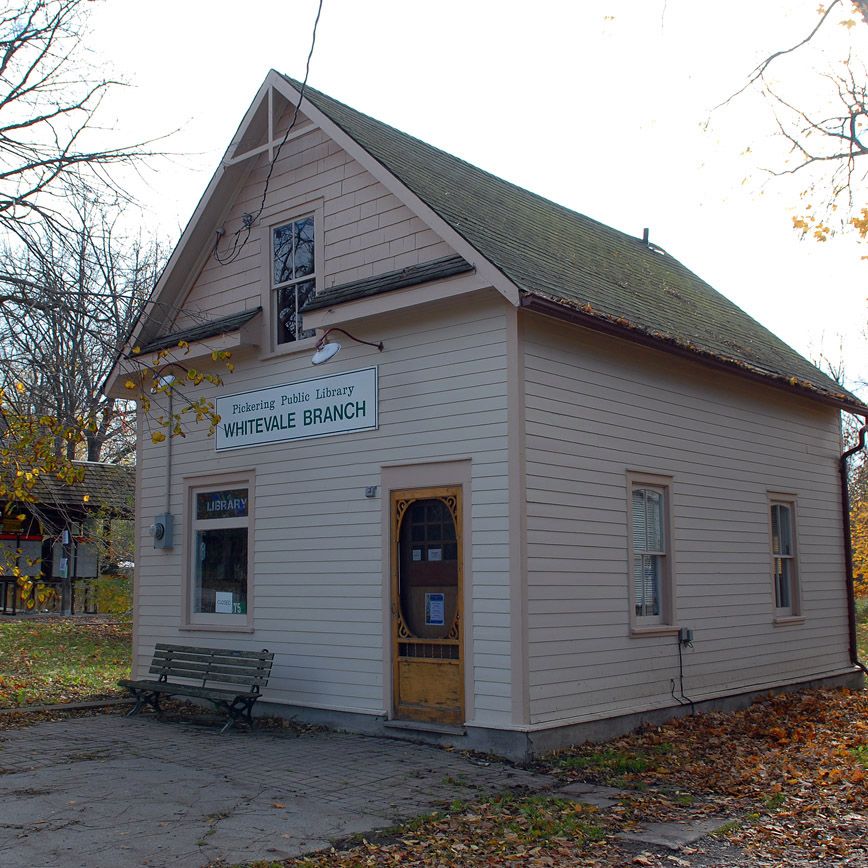
Whitevale Library Est. 1925

Annual events include the Fisherman's Breakfast held in April at the community centre, the Corn Roast held at the Whitevale Church at the end of the summer, Whitevale Porchfest held on porches throughout the village in September, and the Whitevale Spring Festival which has been held every May since 1972. These events are held for both residents and out-of-towners. The Whitevale and District Residents' Association (WDRA) helps organize events and oversees many aspects of the community, looking out for the best interests of the town and its citizens.

=== Businesses ===
- Dinner Theatre
- Golf Club

=== Facilities ===
- Whitevale Arts and Culture Centre (formerly the Pickering Public Library)
- St. Joseph of Arimathea Orthodox Church
- Whitevale Cemetery
- Whitevale Community Centre
- Whitevale Park
- Seaton Hiking Trail (along Duffins Creek)

== Film shoots ==
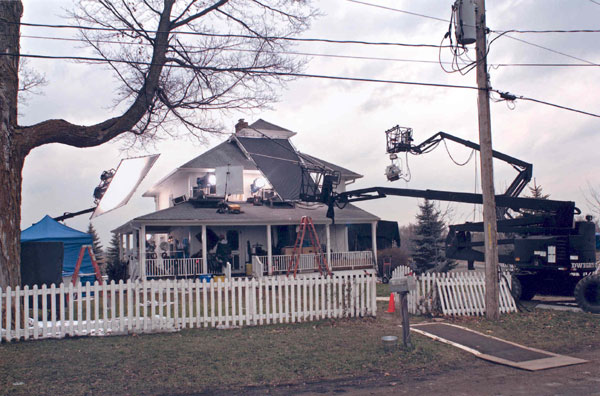
"Lars and the Real Girl" film shoot in Whitevale (2006)

=== Television ===
- The Canadian television show Paradise Falls was filmed in Whitevale
- An episode of Lost Girl was filmed in Whitevale (June 2012)
- An episode of Beauty & the Beast was filmed in Whitevale (November 2012)
- An episode of The Littlest Hobo was filmed in Whitevale in the 1980s.
- A farmhouse in Whitevale was used as the location for Will Graham's house in the television show Hannibal (2013–15)
- Scenes for the TV series American Gods was shot on North Rd in Whitevale

=== Movies ===
- Parts of David Cronenberg's film Dead Zone were filmed in Whitevale (1983)
- Academy Award Nominated film, Lars and the Real Girl (2007)
- A Home At The End of the World (2004)
- Secrets of Eden – Lifetime TV Movie (2011)
