= Pickering Airport Lands =

Proposed second airport to serve Toronto, Ontario, Canada

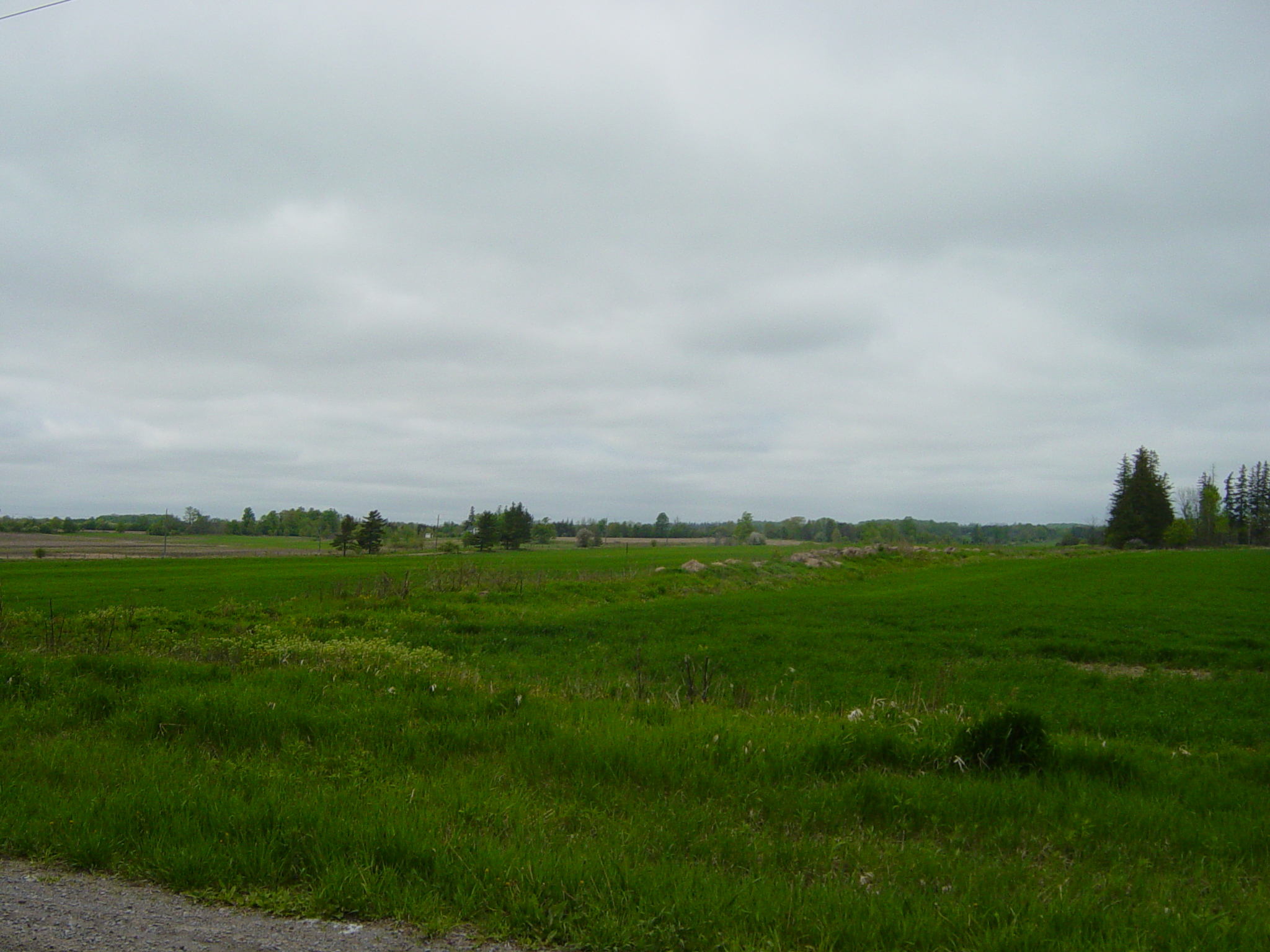
Pickering Airport Lands

The Pickering Airport Lands are parcels of lands owned by the Government of Canada located in York Region and Durham Region in the Greater Toronto Area of Ontario. The lands, totaling approximately 18,600 acres (7,500 hectares) and located approximately 56 kilometres (35 miles) east of Downtown Toronto, were expropriated in 1972 by the federal government for use as the site of a second international airport to serve the city of Toronto, its metropolitan area, and the surrounding Golden Horseshoe region. There was local opposition to an airport from the day of the original announcement.

Plans for an airport were developed during the late 1960s and early 1970s. The 1972 announcement affected properties in Pickering, Uxbridge, and Markham townships in York and Durham Regions. Residents were forced to leave as demolitions of houses and barns began. Preliminary airport construction activity was halted in 1975 when the provincial partner in the enterprise, the Government of Ontario, declared it would not build the roads or sewers needed to service the site. Despite later attempts by the federal government to revive the project, construction activities never resumed, and no operator was selected. Instead, one-year leases were offered to tenants for residential, commercial, and agricultural uses. Eventually, more than half the site was transferred to Parks Canada, to form the Rouge National Urban Park.

In the decades that followed the shelving of the airport project, the federal government commissioned a number of studies to assess future aviation needs in southern Ontario. The most recent was announced in April 2023. By then, the potential future airport site had been reduced to approximately 3,521 hectares (8,700 acres).

On January 27, 2025, the federal government officially cancelled all plans for the Pickering Airport and is instead looking at transferring the remaining lands to the Rouge National Urban Park.

== History ==
=== Initial proposal, expropriation, and abandonment ===
In the late 1960s, the federal government (which then owned and operated all major Canadian airports) studied expanding Malton Airport (now Toronto Pearson International Airport) to accommodate the tremendous growth in air passenger traffic anticipated in the coming decades. Strong local-community opposition to Malton's expansion caused the government to decide instead, in December 1968, to build a second Toronto airport. An Airport Planning Team spent 1969 evaluating nearly 60 sites within a 50-nautical-mile radius of Malton. The final contenders were Lake Scugog, Lake Simcoe, Orangeville, and Guelph, with the Guelph site ranked highest.

In May 1971, in a Toronto-Centred Region plan, the provincial government announced its intention to direct new growth to the east of Toronto. This eastern emphasis became a cause of friction between the federal and provincial governments: the federal government preferred an airport location to the west, the province wanted an eastern site. In an attempt to resolve the impasse, the federal government proposed a plan to build three new airports instead of one. Two small 2,000–4,000 hectare (5,000–10,000 acre) airports would be built to handle short-haul traffic, on sites previously eliminated as unsuitable for a large airport. The first of these small airports would be constructed in the west, in Beverly Township, near Hamilton, followed immediately by the second one in the east, in Pickering Township. A third airport – a large 6,000–8,000 hectare (15,000–20,000 acre) international airport – would be built later, at an undetermined location. In December 1971, the province told the federal government that it could not afford to service both a Beverly and a Pickering site and that it had committed funds to build sewer and water facilities only to the east of Toronto.

The federal government abandoned its plan for three new airports and decided instead to build one large international airport east of Toronto. On March 2, 1972, the federal Minister of Transport announced the construction of a "major airport" in Pickering, while the Treasurer of the Province of Ontario simultaneously announced plans for a new satellite city, called Cedarwood, to be built immediately south of the airport. The federal government expropriated about 7,530 hectares (18,600 acres) of farmland for the airport, as well as the village of Brougham and the hamlet of Altona.

Expropriation went ahead despite widespread public opposition and the Province's ongoing concerns. In September 1975, airport construction was halted when the Government of Ontario withdrew its agreement to provide the necessary infrastructure for the site. A similar major land expropriation had taken place in 1969, north of Montreal, for Montréal–Mirabel International Airport. Phase I of Mirabel opened in 1975, the same year that construction on the Pickering project was stopped. The federal government retained its ownership of the lands expropriated for the Pickering airport, reserving the option to revive the project at some point in the future.

=== Project revival attempts ===
After the shelving of the airport in 1975, the federal government began to lease the site's farmland and houses to tenants, some of them former owners of the properties. This practice continued, and there were no significant developments until 2001, when Transport Canada resurrected the airport idea and commissioned the Greater Toronto Airports Authority (GTAA) to "undertake interim planning work that would enable the federal government to determine if it should proceed with a regional/reliever airport on the Pickering Lands". In 2002, the federal government announced a plan to preserve 3,051 hectares (7,540 acres) of the site, no longer needed for the airport, as green space in perpetuity, providing a corridor of land connecting the Rouge Park with the Oak Ridges Moraine. Management and protection details of the Federal Green Space plan were never formalized. On September 30, 2004, site zoning regulations were passed for an airport on the Federal Lands in Pickering. In November 2004, the GTAA submitted its Pickering Airport Draft Plan Report to Transport Canada. The plan was for a large three-runway reliever airport but also referred referred to the long history of agricultural activity on the Pickering lands and noted that the "fertile soils have led to the majority of the land being classified as Class 1 or 2 in the Canada Land Inventory soil capability classification for agriculture".

The draft plan went into limbo when Transport Canada announced on May 9, 2007, that the GTAA had now been commissioned to complete "a needs assessment study for a potential Pickering airport". The Needs Assessment Study: Pickering Lands, Final Report was submitted to Transport Canada in March 2010. After a "due diligence review", Transport Canada released the report to the public on July 11, 2011. The study concluded that an additional airport would be needed "but it is not expected to be required before 2027 and possibly not before 2037". The study recommended that the federal government "retain and protect the site, thereby preserving the option of building an airport, if and when required".

The Canadian Owners and Pilots Association of private plane owners and pilots, took exception to the methodology and conclusions of the study, arguing that "the process to implement a new airport at Pickering should be well underway right now". Transport Action Ontario, in its own response to the study report, questioned some of the study's claims and suggested that, in lieu of building a new airport, "higher-speed, electrified rail" would be a "far superior alternative" for much of the short-haul traffic currently handled by Pearson Airport.

On June 11, 2013, the federal finance minister, Jim Flaherty, announced revised plans for the Pickering airport lands, stating that the Government of Canada would set aside an area in the southeast, of about 3,500 hectares (8,700 acres), for a future airport that would be needed in the 2027–2037 time-frame. About 2,000 hectares (5,000 acres) in York Region would be transferred to Parks Canada, to become part of the new Rouge National Urban Park. The remaining land, approximately 2,000 hectares (4,900 acres), was earmarked for economic development. The Harper government's announcement also reaffirmed the federal government’s intention to hold land on the site for a future airport, stating that the needs assessment study's conclusion was that the airport would be required within the 2027–2037 time-frame.

On April 1, 2015, Transport Canada formally transferred to Parks Canada a total of 1,911 hectares (4,722 acres) of the Federal Lands, as the first tract of land to be part of the new park, where agriculture would be one of the central pillars.

Three months later, on July 11, 2015, Prime Minister Harper announced an additional 2,100 hectares (5,200 acres), in Pickering and Uxbridge, would soon be transferred to the Rouge National Urban Park. This meant that over half the farmland, streams, and natural habitat expropriated in 1972–1973 would be permanently protected. The Prime Minister also said that the federal government intended to use the remaining lands for economic development, adding: "But let there be no doubt. Our Government will only support projects on these lands, including an airport, if they are backed by a sound business plan and if they are in the best interests of this community."

On July 13, 2015, Lisa Raitt, the federal Minister of Transport, while confirming that no decisions had been made on the development or timing of a potential future airport, reaffirmed that the remaining lands were being retained for economic development, including a potential future airport. She also indicated that an independent advisor would be appointed to consult with local public and private interests on potential economic opportunities on the site, including a future airport, and would report back to the government within 12 months. Meanwhile, Transport Canada would assess future aviation needs across the Greater Golden Horseshoe to determine if there was a business case for a Pickering airport.

Five dates later, on July 18, 2015, Transport Canada released a draft of revised Pickering Airport Site Zoning Regulations for the retained lands, to ensure that development on surrounding lands remained compatible with a potential future airport site. No final version was ever released.

In June 2016, Transport Canada's consultant, Dr. Gary Polonsky, presented his report on airport stakeholder viewpoints, based on 64 individual and small-group interviews he conducted in 2015 and 2016. The report was released to the public in November. Dr. Polonsky's first recommendation: "Undertake the analysis required to make a decision on the need for an airport." The consulting firm of KPMG had already been commissioned by Transport Canada (in May 2016) to review aviation demand and capacity within the southern Ontario airport system over the next 20 years.

At the same time, Transport Canada announced that it would begin offering 10-year agricultural leases on the Lands in place of the 1-year leases that had been available since the 1970s. That announcement was soon followed by confirmation that the second transfer of Pickering Lands to the Rouge National Urban Park had been completed, leaving approximately 3521 hectares (8700 acres) for a potential future airport.

KPMG's full report, "Pickering Lands Aviation Sector Analysis", was released by Transport Canada on March 5, 2020. The study’s scope of work had required KPMG to prepare three reports, the first on Supply and Demand, the second on Airport Type and Role in the Southern Ontario Regional Airport System, and the third on Revenue-Generating Potential and Economic Impact. However, a Transport Canada factsheet for the Pickering Lands emphasized that "The report was not intended to provide a recommendation on whether to build an airport on the Pickering Lands. The Aviation Sector Analysis is one of many inputs into the development of policy options on the future of the Pickering Lands." KPMG’s analysis found no requirement for a new airport within the period under study (2016-2036) and gave no indication as to when an airport might be needed after that.

The Minister of Transport, Omar Alghabra, announced on April 18, 2023, that Transport Canada had issued a Request for Proposals, seeking aviation professional services contractors to help the department analyze current and future airport supply and demand in Southern Ontario. The Minister also announced that the government had no intention of proceeding with the building of an airport on the Pickering Lands in the near term, and that the study’s conclusions could even indicate that no airport would be needed in the long term.

On April 24, 2023, Pickering Council voted 6–1 to withdraw its previous support for an airport on the lands and to spend no more tax dollars or staff resources on the proposal. As part of the same motion, Council voted unanimously to renew the city's support for a station near Green River in north Pickering for the federal government's proposed high-frequency rail line along the Quebec City–Windsor corridor. The agricultural land on the remaining Pickering Lands continued to be farmed by tenants.

On January 27, 2025, before a packed hall at Pickering Glen Golf Club on the Federal Lands, Anita Anand, Minister of Transport, and Jennifer O’Connell, MP for Pickering-Uxbridge, accompanied by other ministers and members of Parliament, announced the cancellation of the Pickering airport plan to an ecstatic audience. The 53-year battle to stop an airport was over. The “vast majority” of the lands will be added to Rouge National Urban Park. The future of the remaining lands will be determined through upcoming consultations with First Nations representatives, tenants, other local stakeholders, and advocates for Class 1 soil preservation.

== Controversy ==
=== Pickering site selection ===
The selection process of the site for the new airport was controversial as all candidate locations were opposed by the local residents. The 1974 Gibson inquiry did review the process and found "No new evidence to suggest that Pickering site was not appropriate" (pp. 29–32, Airport Inquiry Commission, Justice Hugh Gibson). Local residents and several newspapers disagreed, claiming that in June 1971, a federal Department of Transport team, having visited the Pickering site with a consultant, reported that a Pickering airport would disrupt community development plans and destroy "high quality farmland", that the rolling countryside would be costly to level, and that the town of Claremont would have to be phased out. Furthermore, the site offered no room for expansion. It was suitable for a two-runway airport, with four runways possible "but with considerably greater difficulty". In August 1971, Ontario planners came to similar conclusions, stating that a Pickering airport would prevent the creation of two planned towns called Brock and Audley, would destroy an area designated as a provincial agricultural and recreational preserve, and would "have a major influence on the operation of Toronto International". Despite the site's drawbacks, which had led to Pickering's elimination early in the original site selection process, the federal announcement of March, 1972, described Pickering as an "excellent" site. This was not the case. It was chosen because it was the only site left in the provincially preferred area east of Toronto, after Lake Scugog had been disqualified for being too far out, too costly to develop, too important a recreational area to disrupt, and too prone to poor weather. The Lake Scugog site had also been described as "unfavourable, as the majority of users, as well as Malton airport itself, are separated from the site by Metropolitan Toronto".

=== Political decisions favouring a new airport over expansion of the existing airport ===
Well into the 1970s, the Department of Transport remained adamant that Malton could not be expanded, citing noise and safety concerns. However, there were also political reasons behind the federal government's wish to build a second airport. Representatives of the local anti-airport protest group, People or Planes, meeting in Ottawa in 1972 with Transport Minister Jean Marchand, were told by him that he did not want to be the "French Canadian who could be accused of not giving an airport to Ontario after having given one to Quebec [Mirabel]". Together with Minister Marchand's desire to give Toronto what he had just given Montreal, there was the advice of chief consultant Philip Beinhaker, of Peat Marwick and Partners, who, while admitting a preference for expanding Malton, had pronounced the expansion "politically unsaleable", in part because Malton and a vocal group of anti-expansion residents there were in Premier-in-waiting William Davis's electoral riding.

Within months of the halt to construction at Pickering, new federal Transport Minister Otto Lang was announcing that no new air carriers would be allowed at Malton for at least five years. Malton's general manager accused federal officials of stalling improvements to the airport as a way of making Ontario reverse its position and provide supporting infrastructure for Pickering after all. In November 1978, Minister Lang told the House of Commons that Malton would not be expanded, and a study into a possible fourth runway was stopped.

The interdiction did not last. Over the years, Toronto Pearson International has been expanded to five runways, with a sixth runway planned.

=== Air passenger forecast inaccuracies ===
Numerous studies were undertaken in the late 1960s to determine whether Canada's airports could deal with future air passenger volumes. At Malton, passenger numbers in 1970 totalled 6.4 million, but consultants' forecasts for the turn of the century ranged from 25 million to 198 million. The federal government's plans for Malton and Pickering were ultimately based on an anticipated 60 million to 96 million passengers through Toronto by 2000.

In 2000, Toronto Pearson International processed about 28 million passengers. By 2003, owing to international crises, that number had dropped to just over 24 million but climbed again to 32.3 million passengers in 2008, with an average of 1,179 "aircraft movements" per day. By 2014, passenger numbers had climbed to nearly 39 million, about 62% of the 62 million passengers the GTAA was then forecasting for Pearson by 2032.

Pearson’s total passenger numbers climbed to 50.5 million in 2019, but the Covid-19 pandemic had a devastating impact on global aviation, starting with the first lockdowns in the spring of 2020. By July 2020, Pearson’s passenger numbers had dropped to 1996 levels. Only 13.3 million passengers were processed through Pearson that year. In 2023, passenger activity recovered to 88.7 per cent relative to the same period in 2019.

=== Community opposition ===
From the date of the initial announcement, in 1972, there was significant and persistent community opposition to a Pickering airport, originally led by People or Planes, then by V.O.C.A.L. (Voters Organized to Cancel the Airport Lands), and since 2005, by Land Over Landings. Transport Canada’s Southern Ontario Area Airports Study (1995) acknowledged the “long history of strong local opposition to an airport, which had not appeared to decrease over time.

=== General aviation community concerns ===
There is strong support for Pickering Airport from COPA flight 44 Canadian Owners and Pilots Association also known as the Buttonville Flying Club. Both the Friends of Pickering Airport and an older 2011 privately funded proposal to build a not for profit Airpark in Pickering originated from this General Aviation community. This community of pilots supports keeping all nearby airports open including Buttonville, Oshawa and Markham. The Markham Airport, home to the Canadian Air Land Sea Museum, is the most at risk as it is right next door and under the approach to runway 10R at the new airport. In addition part of Markham airport, including half of its only runway, was originally expropriated for the Pickering airport. Questions on if the construction of the Pickering Airport next to an existing airport (Markham CNU8) would violate the Aeronautical Act have been raised by the airports opponents. The Markham Airport, has been around since 1965 and is currently looking to expand to a 6,000 ft runway and take-on the new role of private aviation airport after the closure of the Buttonville Airport. The land that Buttonville Airport sits on has been sold for development to Cadillac Fairview and the airport closed on November 24, 2023. The city of Oshawa has passed a resolution in council affirming that Oshawa airport will remain open until 2032 or longer. There are no operational and physical constraints that would inhibit Oshawa airport from operating when Pickering opens.

In the draft plan presented by the GTAA in 2004, it proposed closing all three general aviation airports to jumpstart traffic at Pickering airport. Mixing the displaced general aviation traffic with increased heavy passenger jet traffic is a concern to many small aircraft pilots who would have no choice but to use the new airport, as larger airports tend to be less friendly to general aviation, and more difficult for student pilot training.

=== 2015 federal election issue ===
The future of the Pickering Airport Lands became an election issue in the 2015 Canadian federal election. In local candidate meetings only local Conservative candidates expressed support for building an airport on the lands, with the NDP, Liberal and Green candidates expressing opposition.

=== 2018 municipal election issue ===
The future of the Pickering Airport Lands became an election issue in the 2018 Durham Region municipal elections when it was debated whether building a new airport in the Pickering-Ajax area could be a worthwhile economic driver for the region. The mayoral candidates, with the exception of the incumbent, Dave Ryan, were opposed to an airport or were undecided.

== Location ==
The airport, as proposed in June 2013, would be located in the north-central part of Pickering, directly northeast of Toronto and about 65 km (40 mi) east of Toronto Pearson International Airport. The airport landing approach surfaces, as currently zoned, would have aircraft flying a centre line just north of Markham, and just south of Stouffville onto runways 10L and 10R, west of Uxbridge, over part of Ajax onto runway 32, and over part of north Whitby onto runway 28R and 28L. The remnants of the hamlet of Altona and the village of Brougham are situated entirely within the expropriated area. The closest large communities are Claremont (an exurban village of around 2,800 residents, located northeast of the airport lands in Pickering), and to the west, in York Region, the town of Stouffville and the city of Markham.

A significant 15th century Huron ancestral village on the airport site (the Draper Site) was completely excavated in 1975 and 1978 in anticipation of the airport's construction.

== See also ==
- List of airports in the Greater Toronto Area
