= Geordie Lishman =

Canadian sculptor and animator

- Born: 1975 (age 50–51); Port Perry, Ontario, Canada
- Education: Vancouver Film School (2002)
- Known for: Sculpture, Kinetic art, 3D Animation
- Notable work: True Power, The Rock People, Spirit of Pickering, Gordon's Guitar
- Parent(s): Bill Lishman (father); Paula Lishman (mother)
- Website: www.geordielishman.com

Geordie Lishman (born 1975) is a Canadian sculptor, painter, and educator. He creates large-scale kinetic sculptures and public art installations primarily located throughout the Greater Toronto Area and Durham Region. His work frequently utilizes recycled industrial steel and mechanical elements to encourage community interaction.

== Early life and education ==
Lishman was raised in Port Perry, Ontario. He is the son of inventor and artist Bill Lishman and fashion designer Paula Lishman. During the 1990s, he worked alongside his father as a technical consultant and bird wrangler for the film Fly Away Home (1996), which was based on his father's work with migratory birds.

In 2002, Lishman graduated from the Vancouver Film School. Following his graduation, he worked as a 3D animator on film and television projects, including Air Bud: Seventh Inning Fetch and the television adaptation of A Wrinkle in Time. Since 2007, he has served as a faculty member at Durham College, teaching 3-D Studio and Metal Sculpture.

== Artistic career and public works ==
Lishman transitioned into fine art focusing on metalworking, often using recycled scrapyard materials. In 2011, his solo exhibition, Hidden Worlds, was hosted at The Robert McLaughlin Gallery in Oshawa. The centerpiece of the exhibition, True Power—a 4.1-metre stainless steel horse representing potential energy—was subsequently purchased through community fundraising and moved to a permanent location at the Clean Energy Research Centre at Ontario Tech University.

Throughout the 2010s and 2020s, Lishman was commissioned for multiple permanent municipal landmarks. In Ajax, he co-created the metal Ajax Elation fountain at the Ajax Town Hall and designed Communitree (2012), a large-scale steel tree. In 2013, his installation The Rock People, a series of gabion-style figures at the Audley Recreation Centre in Ajax, became the subject of national media attention in the National Post after local residents criticized the physical proportions of the figures.

Lishman's public art is prominent in the City of Pickering. In 2020, he installed Spirit of Pickering in Esplanade Park, which consists of four interactive sculptures (Gather, Inspire, Live, and Work) featuring kinetic elements such as ringer bells and chimes. In 2024, he was commissioned by the city to create Gordon's Guitar, an interactive 12-string guitar sculpture installed in Ernie Stroud Park to honor Canadian musician Gordon Lightfoot.

Other notable public works include Four Directions of Durham (2014) at the Durham Regional Headquarters in Whitby, the metal heron sculpture Inspiration Taking Flight in Oshawa, and the Lions Club Lion in Newmarket's Lions Club Park. In Toronto, he co-created the Baryshnikov Leaps series, a collection of 24 figurative sculptures at Bridgepoint Active Healthcare.

== Memorials ==
Lishman designed the memorial sculpture for the Healing Garden at Lakeridge Health Port Perry. He is also the designer of the planned Bill Lishman Memorial, a 23-foot stainless steel and bronze tribute to his father on the Port Perry waterfront, coordinated in partnership with the Scugog Council for the Arts.
