= Greenwood, Durham Regional Municipality, Ontario =

Coordinates: 43.927°N 79.066°W

Location of Greenwood in Ontario

Greenwood is a small rural hamlet within the city of Pickering in Ontario, Canada.

== History ==
Originally known as Norwood, the community was renamed to Greenwood in 1852 after Frederick Green from March in the Isle of Ely (now Cambridgeshire), England, who had bought a mill here in 1843. This should not be confused with Norwood incorporated as a village in 1878, 100 km to the east.

As a young boy John Diefenbaker (1895–1979), prime minister of Canada, attended Greenwood School where his father briefly taught.

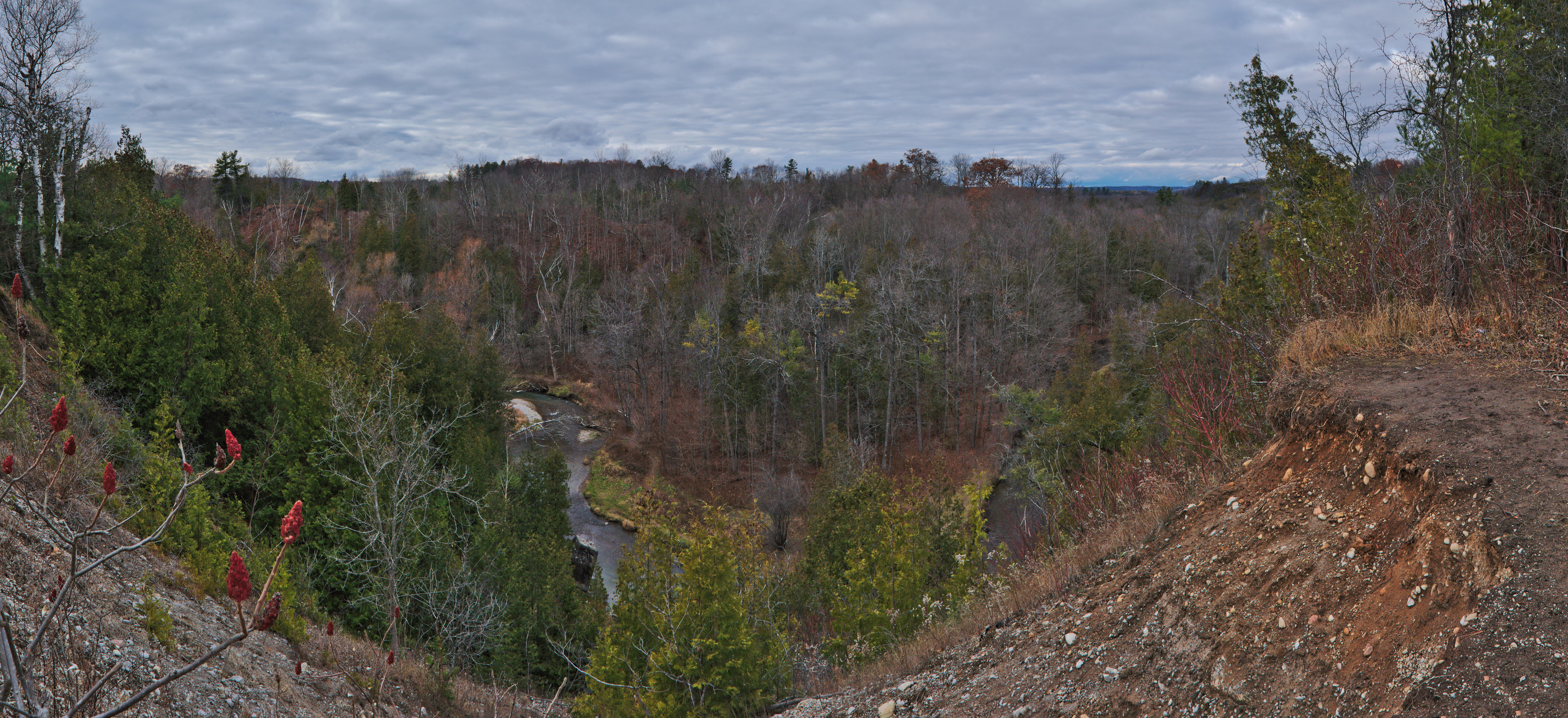
Greenwood Conservation Area in Ajax

Greenwood developed as an unincorporated community within the Pickering Township. When the Regional Municipality of Durham was created in 1974, the southern part of Greenwood was merged with Ajax, and the rest of the territory remained with the Township's successor, the town (later city) of Pickering. "South Greenwood" now exists as a neighbourhood within Ajax. The Greenwood Conservation Area is divided between Ajax and Pickering, and is owned by the Toronto and Region Conservation Authority (TRCA).

The Pickering Museum Village is located on 6th Concession Road in Greenwood. This is the largest history museum in Durham Region with 18 heritage buildings.
