= William McMaster (disambiguation) =

William McMaster (1811–1887) was a Canadian wholesaler, senator and banker.

William McMaster may also refer to:

- William Alexander McMaster (1879–1961), Canadian parliamentarian and lawyer
- William H. McMaster (1877–1968), governor of South Dakota
- William McMaster (businessman) (1851–1930), Canadian businessman
- William McMaster Murdoch (1873–1912), Scottish sailor who served as first officer aboard the RMS Titanic
