= General Engineering Company =

General Engineering Company may refer to:

- General Engineering & Dry Dock Company, a shipbuilding company in Alameda, California, United States which was named General Engineering Company before 1923
- General Engineering Company of Ontario (GECO), a munitions plant in Scarborough, Ontario, Canada
