= Telus Tower =

Office building in Montreal

Coordinates: 45.501984°N 73.566491°W

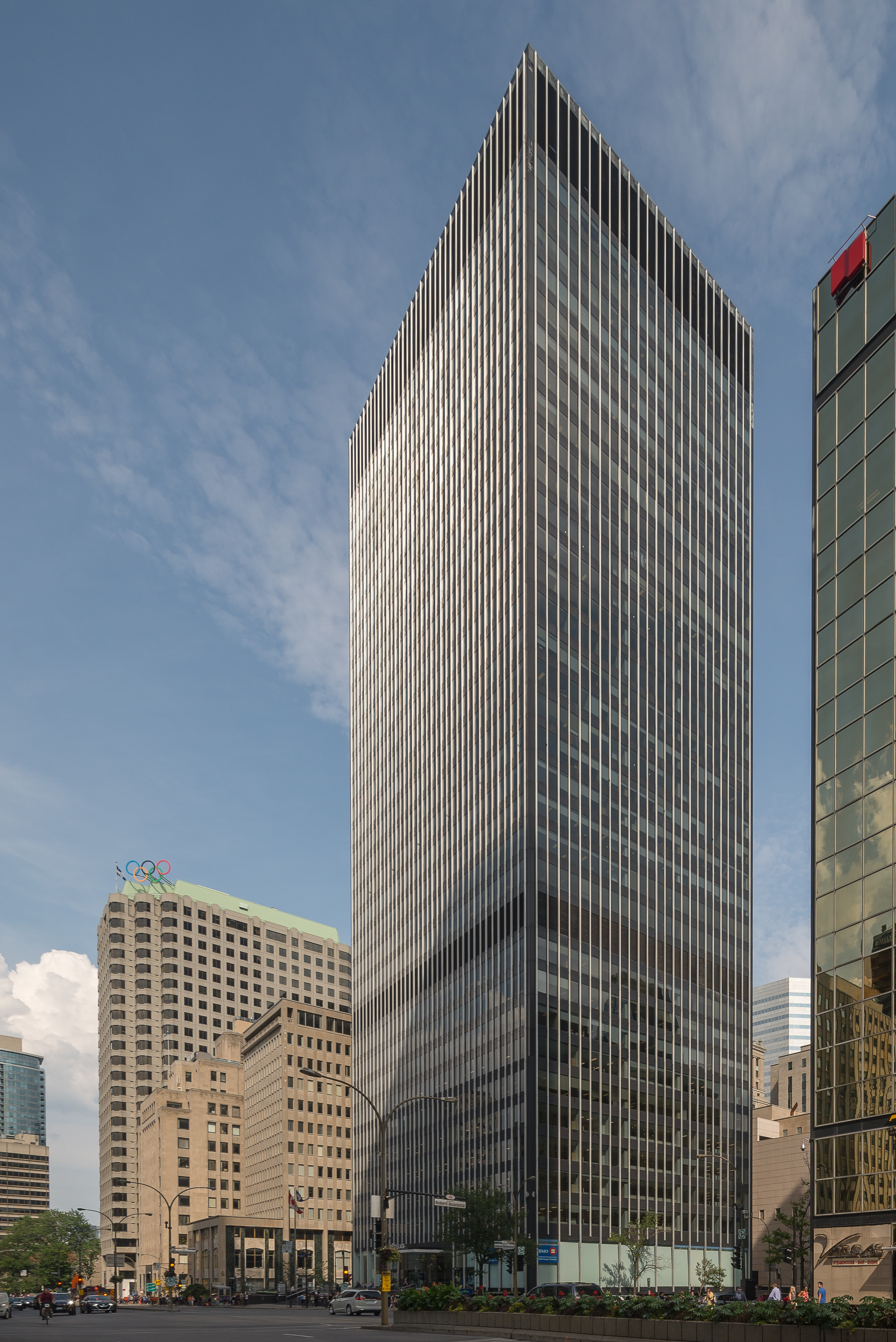

General information
- Location: Montreal, Quebec, 630 boulevard René-Lévesque ouest
- Completed: 1962

Height
- Roof: 135.6 m (445 ft)

Technical details
- Floor count: 34

Design and construction
- Architect: Gordon Bunshaft
- Architecture firm: Greenspoon, Freedlander & Dunne; Skidmore, Owings & Merrill

The Telus Tower is a 34-storey office tower in Montreal. The project was conceived and managed by Ionel Rudberg (1906–1965), and the building was owned originally by Dorchester-University Holdings Limited, a joint venture of Rudberg, the Royal Trust Company, and the Bank of Montreal. The building was announced in January 1959, and in May of that year, Canadian Industries Limited signed as the main tenant and received naming rights. Accordingly, the building was called C-I-L House at the time it opened. Designed by architect Gordon Bunshaft from the architectural firm Skidmore, Owings and Merrill with local architects Greenspoon, Freedlander and Dunne, it stands 135.6 m (445 ft) and 34 storeys tall. In 1960, Bunshaft had recently completed his seminal work, Lever House in New York City.

== History and design ==
During the 1960s when Montreal's financial district shifted from its St. James Street center to midtown, The CIL House also became the annex headquarters of the Bank of Montreal when it added a main banking branch there. Then-named Dorchester Boulevard West became the financial center of Montreal and Canada with the largest Canadian banks and insurance companies having a presence. In later years, CIL moved its head office operations to Ontario. The Royal Trust later received naming rights to the building when it located its head office there until the merger with the Royal Bank of Canada. The name Royal Trust Tower now refers to another building in Toronto.

Today, it is home to the Montreal operations of Telus, the head office of Telus Health Solutions, but also houses the local offices of NEUF architect(e)s, Accenture, Roche, Canada Life, ROBIC, Clyde & Co, Fairstone Bank, as well as a Bank of Montreal branch.
