= Millhaven Fibres =

Third ever made Polyester factory

Coordinates: 44.20762°N 76.71728°W

The Millhaven Fibres Plant opened September 28, 1955 as the third polyester plant in the world. It was originally built to manufacture a new type of synthetic yarn called Terylene, which is known as Dacron in the United States. Terylene polyester fibre was invented in England in 1940 and had wide application in the apparel trade and for industrial use. In 1966, Terylene underwent a name change, to Fortrel. This happened in the same year as the plant's name being changed

The plant, at 5275 Bath Road, was built on a 70-acre site near Napanee, in Millhaven, Lennox and Addington County, Ontario, on the north shore of Lake Ontario. The project, in 1954, was initiated by Canadian Industries Limited, a wholly owned Canadian subsidiary of Imperial Chemical Industries (ICI) Limited of Great Britain. Since then, the plant changed ownership several times and underwent a handful of expansions. The site was owned by ICI of Canada Ltd., Canadian Industries Limited, Millhaven Fibres Ltd., Celanese Canada, Hoechst, and KoSa at various points in its 55-year history, before Invista bought the 75-hectare site on Lake Ontario in 2004.

== History ==
In 1954, the plant began operations under ICI of Canada Ltd, abbreviated as CIL. In 1964, the plant began producing nylon. In 1967, the DI & staple lines were started. In 1968, a tire yarn plant was introduced. Millhaven also invented the polyester tire in this year, which was the fusion of polyester with rubber. In 1971, the plant was bought by Chemcell & Fiber Industries. The nylon filament line was shut down. In 1972, Chemcell changed name to Celanese Canada. In 1973, 1,500 persons were employed at Millhaven Fibres. In 1976, the second staple (manmade fiber) line was built, and the third was built in 1983. In 1987, Hoechst bought Celanese and became a majority shareholder of Celanese Canada. In 1989, the textured yarn line was shut down. In 1992, HDI (heavy denier industrial) was shut down. In 1996, a PET resins line was built for the production of polyester packaging resins. PET is used to manufacture shatter-resistant plastic bottles for water, soft drinks and medicinal and cleaning products. In 2009, the 100 people employed at the plant were laid off.

In 2013, explosives were used to destroy the factory during a controlled demolition.
