= Robic (disambiguation) =

Robic or Robič may refer to:

- Robic (surname)
- ROBIC, an intellectual property law firm based in Montreal, Canada
- Robic (Russian: Робик) — programming language, created in USSR.
- Robik (Russian: Робик) — ZX spectrum based home education PC, produced is USSR from 1989 to 1994.
- Robič settlement under Matajur in the Slovenia.
