= Defence Industries Limited =

Ammunition manufacturer

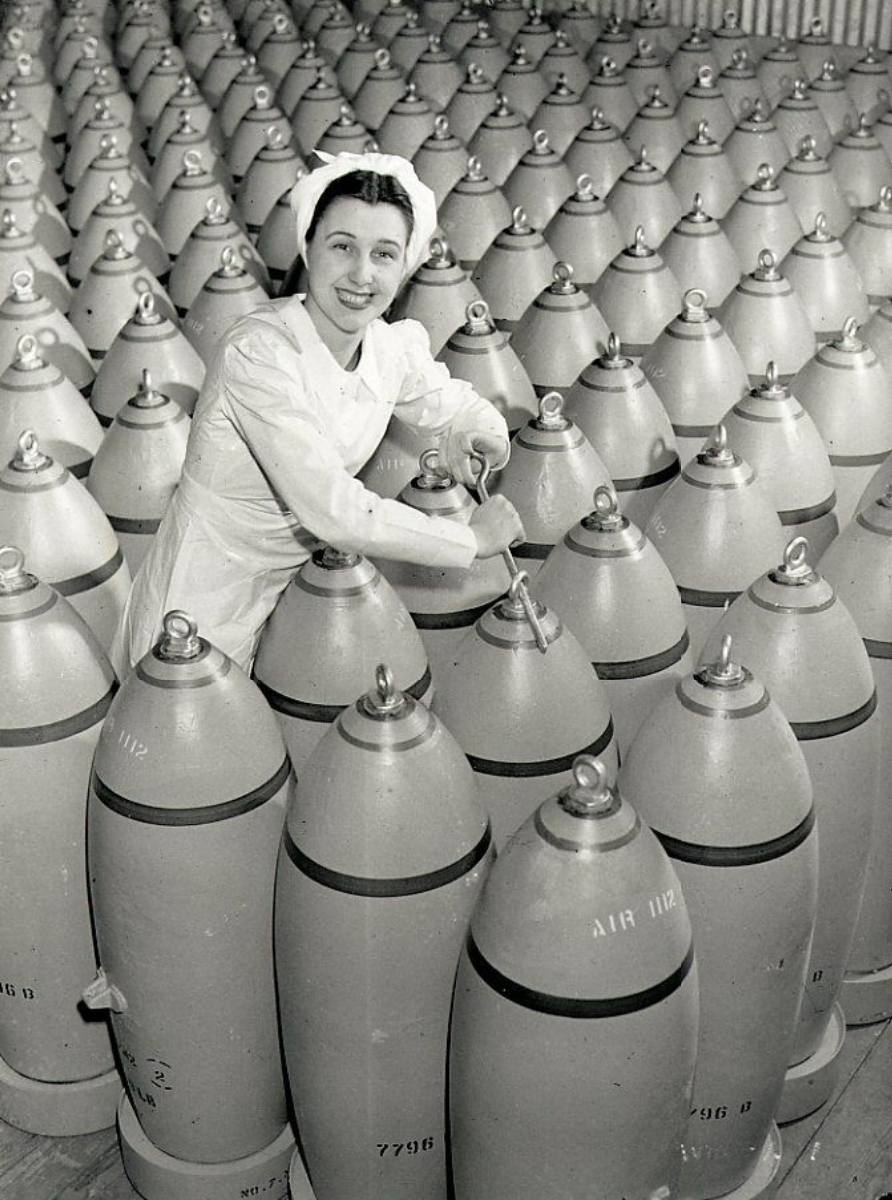
A worker tightens nose plugs of 500-pound bombs at DIL's Pickering Works plant in Ajax

Defence Industries Limited (DIL) was a subsidiary of Canadian Industries Limited (C-I-L), founded in 1939 to manufacture munitions for use in World War II. The company operated in a number of locations in Canada, in the provinces of Ontario, Quebec, and Manitoba. Its Pickering Works shell-filling plant, along with nearby housing, grew into the town of Ajax.

== History ==
=== Explosives manufacture ===
Canadian Industries Limited (C-I-L) created subsidiary Defence Industries Limited (DIL) to manufacture munitions in September 1939, and arranged a contract with the Canadian government to operate two small plants which manufactured TNT and cordite.

In 1940 the Canadian government's Department of Munitions and Supply contracted DIL to refurbish the defunct British Munitions factory in Verdun, Quebec, for the manufacture of munitions. The plant began operations in May 1941. By 1943 the company had constructed about 40 more buildings at the site.

In 1941 DIL also set up a facility in Windsor, Ontario, to manufacture carbamite, a component of cordite; other explosive components were manufactured in Beloeil and Shawinigan, Quebec; Nobel, Ontario; and Winnipeg, Manitoba.

=== Shell-filling ===
DIL set up facilities in St. Paul l'Hermite and Ste Thérèse, Quebec, to fill shells with explosives.

The company purchased 3,000 acres of farmland in Pickering Township, Ontario, for the purpose of building Pickering Works, a large munitions factory. Construction began, and the DIL plant opened in 1941. It employed about 9,000 people, including about 7,000 women, and was the largest munitions production factory in the British Empire. By the end of the war, the workers had filled more than 40 million percussion caps, detonators, bombs, anti-tank mines, armour-piercing and anti-aircraft shells. Although the houses built for the DIL employees were intended to be temporary, after the war the occupants petitioned to buy them, and, after permanent foundations were built, the homes became part of a new town, which was named Ajax after HMS Ajax (22), a light cruiser of the Royal Navy during World War II.

=== Other war materials ===
DIL's Montreal and Brownsburg plants made small arms. In Cornwall the company manufactured mustard gas.

=== Post-war ===
As World War II drew to a close, most of the DIL plants were shut down. DIL was contracted by the federal government to co-ordinate the construction and operation of Chalk River Laboratories, a pilot plant for the production of plutonium using heavy water as a moderator, which was being built in northern Ontario as part of the Manhattan Project. Temporary houses from DIL's plant in the town of Nobel, Ontario were moved to the area, creating a new town, Deep River, to house the workers.

In 1947, operation of the partially completed facility was taken over by the National Research Council; a number of DIL employees were hired by the NRC to provide continuity in the process. DIL continued to oversee construction in progress.

== List of DIL factories ==
Quebec

- l'Usine Cherrier in Saint-Paul-l'Ermite, shell-filling
- l'Usine Bouchard in Sainte-Thérèse, shell-filling
- Montreal Works in Verdun, manufacturing small arms ammunition; a refurbished version of a former British Munitions Supply Company Factory built in 1916 during the World War I
- Villeray, manufacturing small arms ammunition
- Beloeil, manufacturing explosives and cordite
- Brownsburg, manufacturing small arms ammunition
- Shawinigan, manufacturing explosives, cordite, and hexachloroethane
- Île de Salaberry, manufacturing NC cannon powder and TNT

Ontario

- Pickering Works in present-day Ajax, shell-filling
- Windsor, manufacturing explosives and cordite
- Nobel, manufacturing cordite and TNT
- Cornwall, made mustard gas
- Petawawa Works, later Chalk River Laboratories

Manitoba

- Winnipeg, manufacturing explosives and cordite
