= Canadian Industries Limited =

Canadian chemicals company

- Formerly: Canadian Explosives Limited (1910–1927)
- Industry: Chemicals
- Founded: 18 November 1910
- Headquarters: Vaughan, Ontario
- Parent: American Industrial Partners via Pittsburgh Paints Company
- Website: cil.ca

Canadian Industries Limited (CIL, historically stylized C-I-L) is a Canadian supplier of paints, stains, and specialty products based in Vaughan, Ontario. It is Canada's largest paint company with over 1,400 employees and 230 stores. CIL operates Canada's largest paint manufacturing plant, collocated with its headquarters in Vaughan, Ontario. It is the parent company for SICO and Dulux paints.

The company was founded in 1910 as Canadian Explosives Limited, and in 1927 changed its name to Canadian Industries Limited. At its inception, the company was owned jointly by Nobel Industries of Scotland and E. I. du Pont de Nemours and Company of Delaware. In 1926, Nobel merged with several other interests to become Imperial Chemical Industries, which retained the share in C-I-L. In 1954, the United States District Court for the Southern District of New York ruled that the cooperation agreement between Imperial and du Pont was unlawful. Consequently, C-I-L split its operations in two; half went to a newly incorporated C-I-L owned by Imperial, and half went to a new company called Du Pont of Canada Limited.

Canadian Industries Limited was renamed C-I-L Inc. at the beginning of 1980. The next year, the company moved its headquarters from Montreal to Toronto. In April 1988, Imperial merged its Canadian arm, ICI Investments Canada Inc., with C-I-L. The merged company continued as C-I-L Inc. until May 1990, when it was renamed ICI Canada Inc. In 2008, Imperial Chemical was acquired by AkzoNobel. ICI Canada continued to exist until 9 January 2013, when the corporation was dissolved. That year, AkzoNobel sold its Canadian assets to PPG Industries, which continued the operations as PPG Architectural Coatings Canada Inc.

In 2025, following PPG's sale of its North American paint business to American Industrial Partners, the resulting company, Pittsburgh Paints Company, re-established CIL as a standalone entity, manufacturing and selling paints, stains, and specialty products in Canada.

== History ==
=== Hamilton Powder Company ===
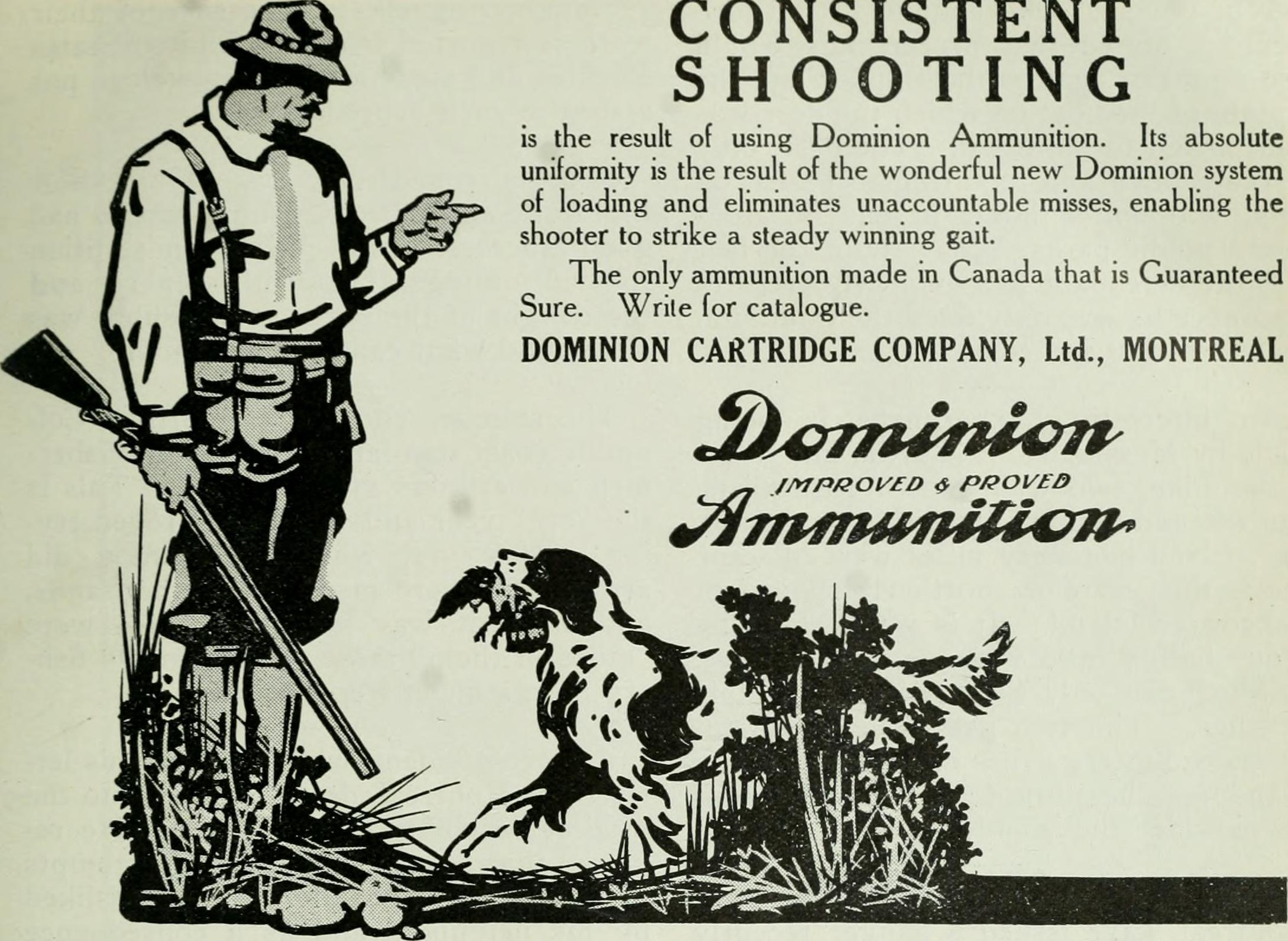
Dominion Cartridge advertisement

The oldest direct ancestor of what would become CIL originally started in 1862, then known as the Hamilton Powder Company. They were created to buy the assets of the former Canada Powder Company, which had formed in 1852. Their major product was black powder, used for blasting. In 1878 the company was purchased by Dr. Thomas C. Brainerd, a U.S. businessman in the black powder industry. In order to provide the massive amounts of explosives needed to build the Canadian Pacific Railway, a new dynamite factory was opened in McMasterville, Quebec. Other black powder plants were acquired in Quebec and the Maritimes and, in 1890, the company opened the first explosives plant in the far west, near Nanaimo, British Columbia. Another major ancestor was the Dominion Cartridge Company, started at Brownsburg, Quebec (just west of Montreal) in 1886 by Captain A. L. ("Gat") Howard, who introduced the Gatling gun into Canada and operated a battery of two of the new weapons during the Riel Rebellion.

=== Canadian Explosives Company ===
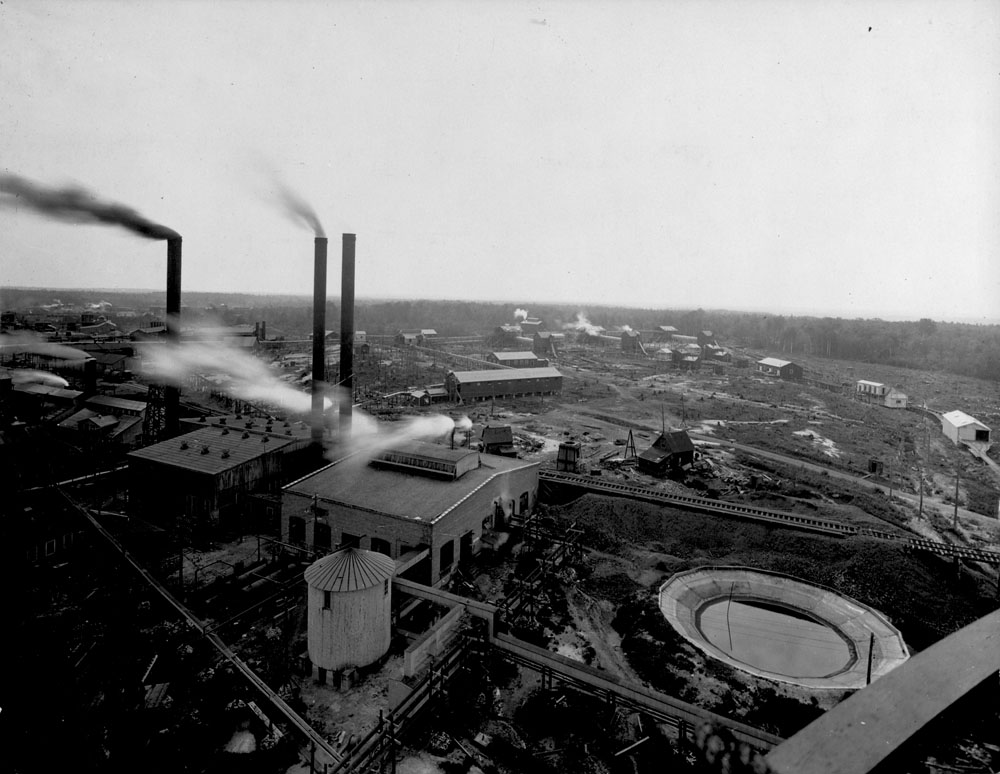
Bird's-eye view of a portion of Canadian Explosives Ltd., Nobel, Ontario

In 1910 Hamilton Powder and Dominion Cartridge merged with the Acadia Powder Company, Ontario Powder Company, Standard Explosives Company, Western Explosives Company and Victoria Chemical Company to form the Canadian Explosives Company (CXL). This was a major supplier to the Canadian Expeditionary Force during World War I, which led to the building of a new factory in the newly christened Nobel, Ontario in 1914. CXL also operated another plant across the highway on behalf of British Cordite Limited. All of the Nobel plants closed after the war in 1922, when secondary markets were not forthcoming. Then all was lost in a huge fire in 1923.

=== Canadian Explosives Limited ===
During the 1920s they diversified into paint and varnish, coated fabrics and plastics and changed their name in 1927 to Canadian Explosives Ltd. (CEL). In 1928, they re-opened the Nobel plants and acquired the Dominion Cartridge Company. In 1929 CEL merged with the Canadian Salt Co. Ltd. (CSXX), Grasselli Chemical Co. Ltd. (Grasselli), and part of the Mond Nickel Company (MNX) and changed their name to Canadian Industries Ltd (CIL).

=== World War II ===
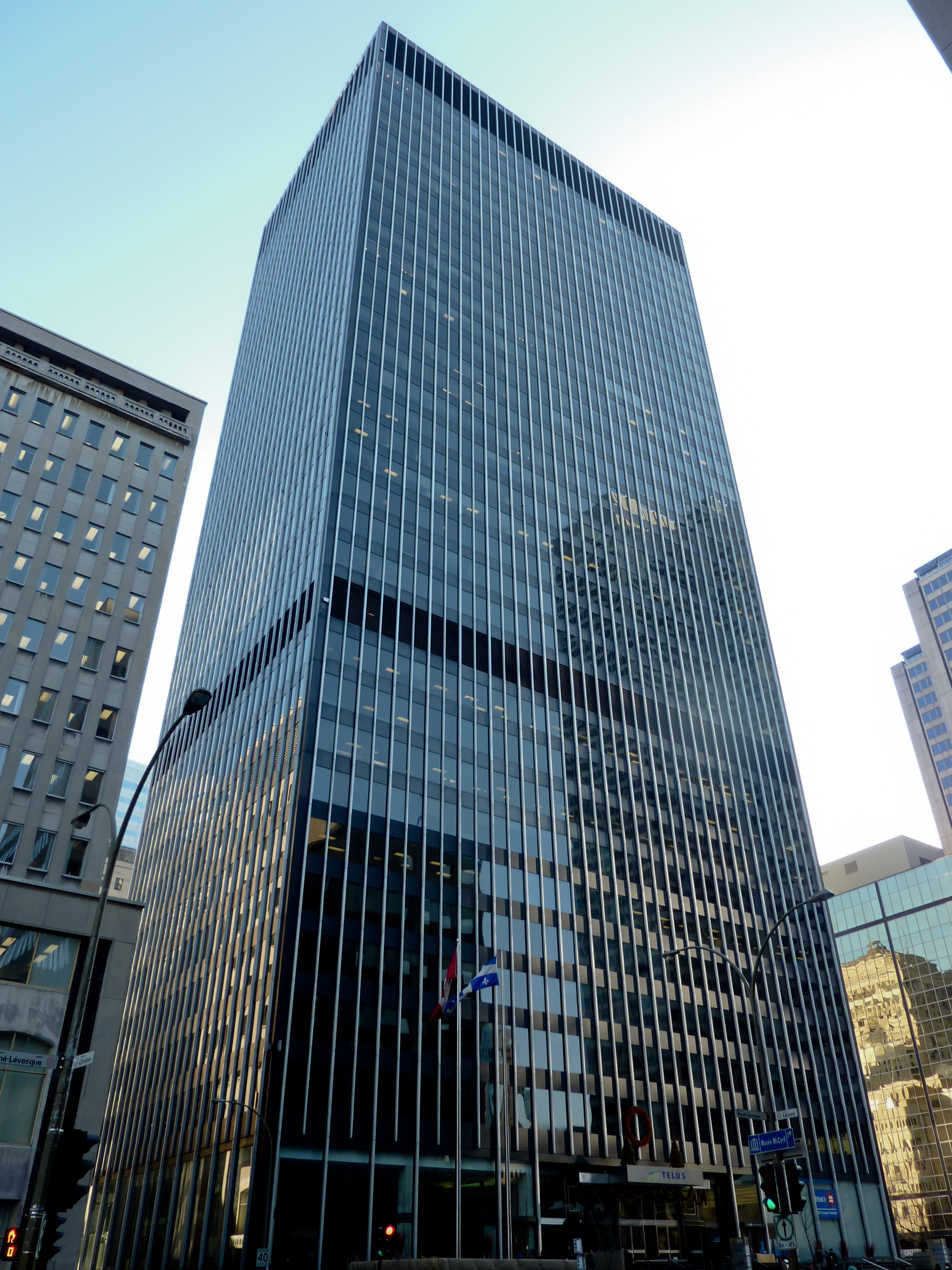
From 1962 to 1981 the company was headquartered at C-I-L House in Montreal.

With the approach of World War II, the company formed a subsidiary in September 1939 called Defence Industries Limited. Cartridge plants were opened on Park Avenue in Brownsburg, Quebec with government funding and the technical assistance of the Dominion Cartridge Company. A cannon shell factory (and the entire nearby town itself) was built at Ajax, Ontario (nicknamed "Dilville"). They opened new plants on the site formerly used by British Cordite in Nobel. The Nobel site employed 4,300 people at its peak, and the company as a whole employed 33,000.

On 3 May 1944, a CIL sulfuric acid plant in Sudbury, Ontario was certified as unionized by Mine-Mill Local 598.

Because so many working-age men were fighting overseas in the armed forces, these plants employed large numbers of women. At the Ajax DIL plant about 7,000 women filled more than 40 million shells.

=== Post war ===
A great post-war building program geared C-I-L to meet peacetime needs for explosives, paints, agricultural and industrial chemicals, plastics, sporting ammunition and man-made textile fabrics. The Nobel plants were once again closed, and this time sold off to Orenda Aerospace for use in jet engine development.

In 1913 the predecessor of CXL had established a dynamite plant on James Island, B.C. off the coast of Vancouver Island and near the town of Sidney, B.C. The plant was later reacquired by CIL and produced explosives until its closure in 1972.

=== Re-organization ===
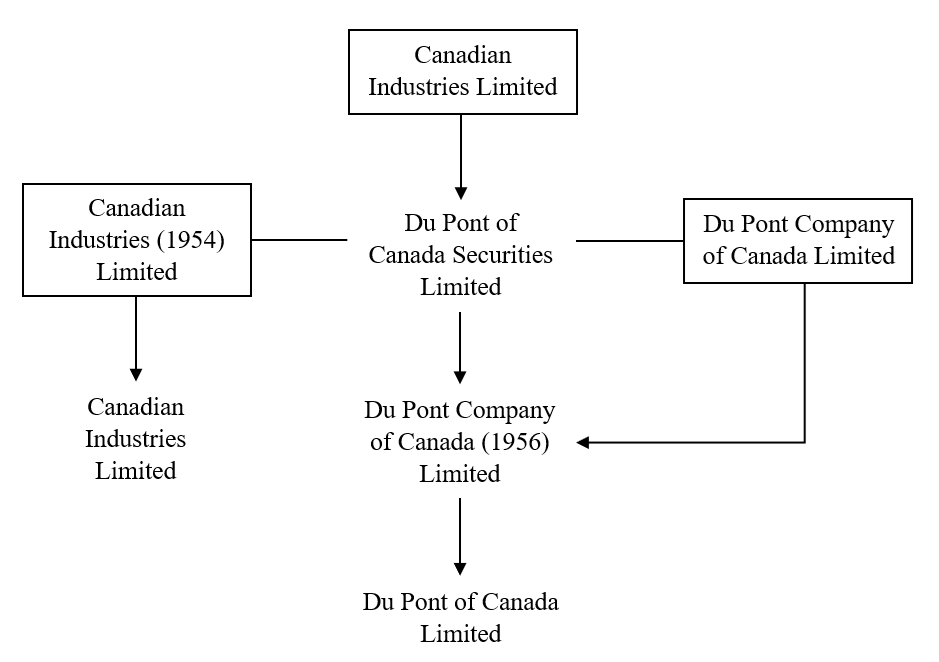
Structure of the 1954 reorganisation

In 1954 C-I-L was divided into two separate companies in accordance with the ruling of a U.S. court which had ordered E. I. du Pont de Nemours (today's DuPont) to end its joint interests with Imperial Chemical Industries Limited (ICI). Until 2010, C-I-L operated as part of Imperial Chemical Industries. In 2010 ICI was bought by AkzoNobel, a Dutch chemical company. Then in 2014, AkzoNobel's North American architectural coatings division was acquired by PPG Industries and has operated as PPG Architectural Coatings Canada since. The CIL brand is sold in major Canadian retailers Home Depot, Canadian Tire, Walmart and Rona/Réno-Dépôt.

In 1976 Industries Valcartier Inc. bought out CIL's commercial cartridge production. This granted them the rights to CIL's popular Dominion, Imperial and Canuck commercial ammunition brands.

In August 1980, CIL announced its intention to relocate its head offices to Toronto. Construction began on the new CIL House at 90 Sheppard Avenue East, which opened in late 1981. The building was designed by Shore Tilbe Henschel Irwin Peters.

Another of their manufacturing facilities, the Millhaven Fibres plant, was formerly located in Millhaven, west of Kingston, Ontario.

The C-I-L lawn and garden chemical brand was owned by Sure-Gro Inc. of Brantford, Ontario, Canada. Their other brands included Nature Mix, Green Earth, Wilson and Alaskan Ice Melter. Sure-Gro was acquired by Premier Tech of Rivière-du-Loup, Québec, Canada in 2010 for about $13.5 million.

=== Present ===
In 2025, CIL was re-established as a standalone entity by the Pittsburgh Paints Company. The company operates Dulux stores across Canada and distributes SICO products through retail partners. CIL operates the largest paint manufacturing plant in Canada.

== Leadership ==
=== President ===
1. William McMaster, 1910–1925
2. Arthur Blaikie Purvis, 1925–1941
3. George William Huggett, 1941–1951
4. Harold Greville Smith, 1951 – 31 December 1958
5. Sir Peter Christopher Allen, 1 January 1959 – 1 March 1962
6. Leonard Hynes, 1 March 1962 – 31 December 1970
7. Eric Lyon Hamilton, 1 January 1971 – April 1975
8. Wilfred John Mandry, April 1975 – 27 April 1981
9. Charles Harold Hantho, 27 April 1981 – 31 July 1988
10. Bernard Hendrik Lochtenberg, 1 August 1988 – 1 May 1990
11. Tim Fisher and Brendan Demler, 9 September 2025 – Present

=== Chairman of the Board ===
1. William McMaster, 1925–1930
2. George William Huggett, 1949–1954
3. Sir Peter Christopher Allen, 1 March 1962 – April 1968
4. Leonard Hynes, 1 January 1971 – 1 March 1975
5. Eric Lyon Hamilton, April 1975 – April 1978
6. Wilfred John Mandry, 27 April 1981 – 1983
7. Charles Harold Hantho, 1984 – 31 July 1988

== Company histories ==
- Lank, H. H. and E. L. Williams. The Du Pont Canada History. Du Pont Canada Inc., 1982.

== See also ==
- CIL House
- Science and technology in Canada
- CIL Building
- Departure Bay § History of the area

== Archives ==
There is a Canadian Industries Limited fonds at Library and Archives Canada. Archival reference number is R15655.
