= Defence Industries Limited Pickering Works =

Canadian munitions plant

Defence Industries Limited
- Location in Canada
- Built: 1940–1941
- Operated: 1941–1945
- Location: Ajax, Pickering Township, Ontario, Canada
- Coordinates: 43.84°N 79.02°W
- Industry: Ammunition
- Products: Shells
- Employees: 9,000 (at peak)
- Owner: Government of Canada

Defence Industries Limited (DIL) Pickering Works was a munitions plant owned by the Government of Canada and operated by DIL during 1941–1945, in the Pickering Township of Ontario. The unincorporated community that developed around the plant was named Ajax in honour of the British warship Ajax, and evolved into the town of Ajax, Ontario.

At its peak, the plant had 9000 workers (the majority of them women), and produced over 40 million rounds of shells. The plant premises and the surrounding area had several town-like facilities such as residences for DIL employees, a post office, a fire department, a hotel, recreation centres, a grocery store, a school, a church, and local transit.

== Selection of site ==
Farms and owners of present-day Ajax in 1939, before the expropriation

On 10 September 1939, Canada entered World War II, declaring war on Germany. Because of its distance from the war theatre in Europe, Canada was an ideal location for producing munitions for the Allied forces. The Government of Canada planned to build the largest shell-filling and assembly plant in the British Commonwealth. For this purpose, the government chose a 2,846-acre site in Pickering Township, in what is now the town of Ajax, Ontario. The site was bordered by Duffins Creek in the west, Pickering Beach Road in the east, just north of Highway 401 in the north, and Lake Ontario in the south.

Several factors made this site desirable for building the plant. It comprised leveled farmland that was suitable for expropriation, and ideal for quick construction of the plant buildings. It was close enough to major population centers to ensure a steady supply of workers, but far enough from them to ensure safety and security. It was accessible by road from Highway 2 and Highway 401 (which was in early stages of development), by railway lines, by water from Lake Ontario, and by air from nearby airports. The production lines at the proposed plant had to be separated by considerable distance to avoid accidental explosions at one line affecting the other. The chosen site was large enough to meet this requirement. The proposed plant required a sewage treatment facility and a daily supply of 1 million gallons of water, which was met by Lake Ontario.

The government expropriated land from 18 farm families, including those of Lorne Puckrin, Wilmot Shea, Heber Down, William Heron, Harry Arnold, R. J. Fleming, M. Boswell, William Linton, John Wilson, Lloyd Stanley, William Divine, Elmer Powell, and George Field. The government gave the farmers only a week to move, and offered them $125 an acre on average. Many farmers, whose families had owned the land for multiple generations, considered this compensation inadequate, and were unhappy with the expropriation.

== Construction ==
In February 1940, army surveyors Robinson and Jim Brennan (who later settled in Ajax) arrived to survey the expropriated land. They reached the site using a trail that later became the Cheese Factory Road (now Ritchie Road). To avoid delays, the Government did not issue an invitation to tender, and directly selected the firm of Carter-Halls-Aldinger as the general contractor. By the end of February, the contractors had erected their single-storey frame office buildings, just north of the present-day Ajax Town Hall. Meanwhile, the survey crews started marking the locations for the planned buildings, roadways, and a seven-spur railway line.

Wartime Defense Limited started the construction of a shell-filling plant and associated buildings on the land. Around 2000 carpenters and helpers were involved in the construction. The spring rains made the former farmland muddy, causing the heavy construction equipment to get stuck in the ground. The Government hired the local farmers (including the ones whose lands had been expropriated) to haul lumber. Several farmers bought their own tools and became carpenters on the project.

Backed by federal funds, the construction progressed at a rapid place. For example, the 50,000 square feet storage building No. 2152 was erected and ready for use 24 hours after the foundations were completed. Most of the buildings were frame buildings with corrugated metal roofs, while a few were made of bricks or poured reinforced concrete.

== Operation ==
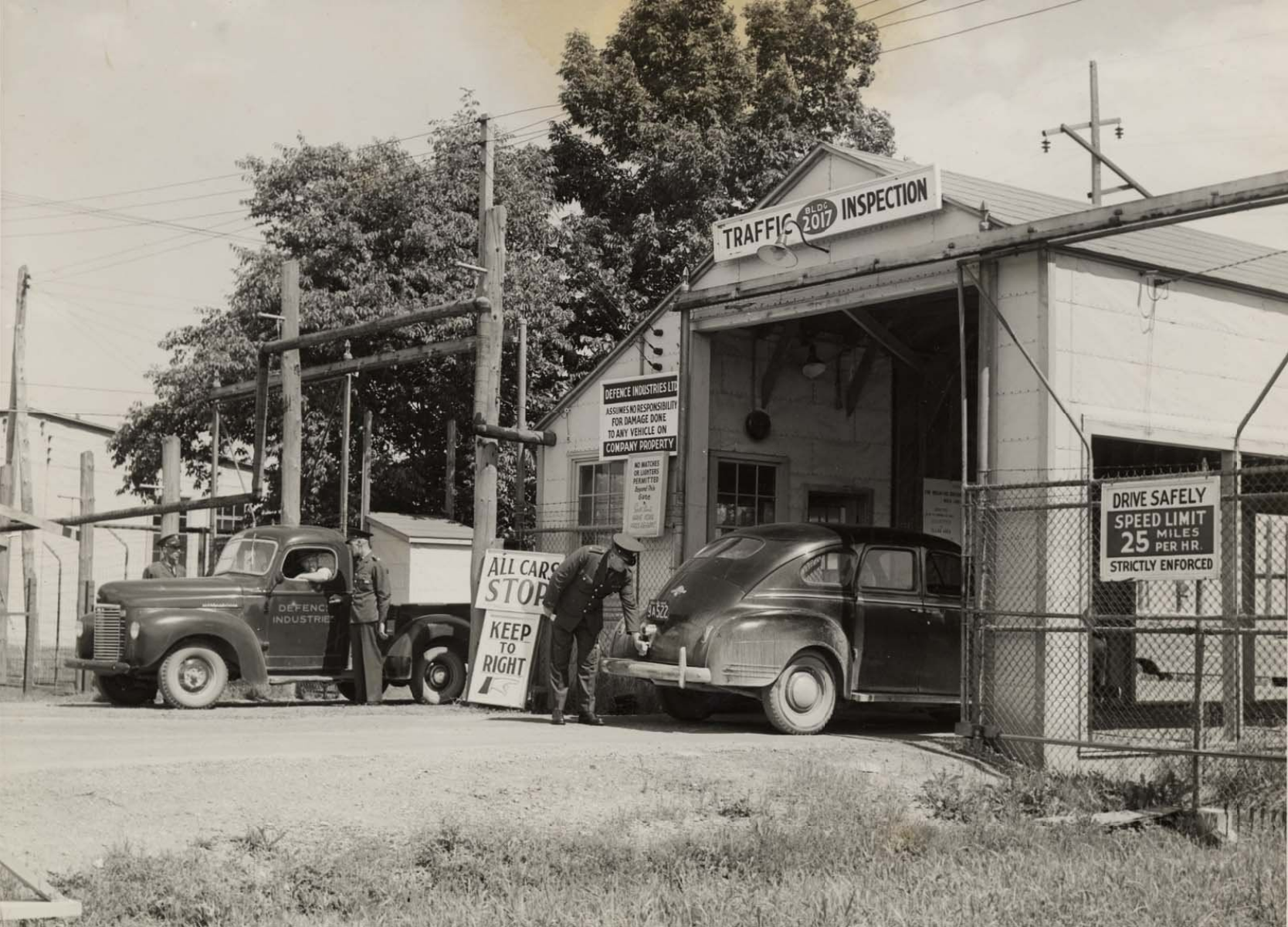
Guards search vehicles at the main gate of DIL on Harwood Ave.

Defence Industries Limited (DIL), a subsidiary of Canadian Industries Limited, operated the plant. CIL had extensive experience in manufacturing and handling explosives for ammunition. The plant was officially a Crown corporation, but practically functioned as a division of CIL.

By the end of 1941, the major plant buildings were ready. The electrical, water and sewer lines were operational. The large central steam plant, which delivered steam to other buildings, was operational as well.

The quality of the Lake Ontario water was good enough for daily use at the time, but DIL still treated the water, removing sediment and chlorinating it. The water was then pumped to the steam plant. A 25,000 gallon steel water tank was mounted 110 feet high to ensure constant supply and reliable pressure.

A sewage treatment plant was built on the Duffins Creek to treat the sewage before it was dumped into the Lake.

DIL had its own transportation department to handle buses, staff cars, and three light railway engines. The DIL railroad required at least 25 employees to operate. The Canadian National Railway installed 30 miles of railway track at DIL, and the major buildings had their own spur lines. The five largest buildings were warehouses with railway lines running through them. They were large enough to accommodate a locomotive and several boxcars, and had massive double doors to allow the trains to enter. Explosive materials used in production arrived at DIL by train. The goods produced at DIL reached the port cities of Montreal and Halifax by train.

The plant was secured like an army camp: an 8-foot fence topped with barbed wire and bright lights surrounding it. Guard huts existed every 300 feet, and were connected to the Chief Security Officer's desk and each other by telephone. In addition, guards also patrolled a gravel road running parallel to the outer parameter of the DIL12 premises. Only DIL employees with a valid ID badge were allowed on the premises, and they were allowed to be in the production area only during their scheduled shifts. They were subject to random searches, and prohibited from smoking on or near the premises. Spies trained at the Camp X were rumoured to have broken into the DIL plant to test security measures.

== The name "Ajax" ==
The plant was originally known as "Defence Industries Limited - Pickering Works", and the sign on the Canadian National Railway (CN) line identified its location as "DILCO".

The Pickering Village post office initially served the plant, but the increase in mail volume soon strained its capacity. Therefore, in 1941, DIL decided to establish its own post office, which required an official name for the place. The workers did not like the existing names in use, "DILCO" (used by CN Rail) or "DIL-ville" (often used jokingly). Therefore, the management ran a naming contest, announcing it in the DIL newsletter The Commando.

Frank Holroyd, the plant's assistant safety director, suggested the winning name "Ajax". He chose the name in honour of the British warship Ajax which took part in the Battle of the River Plate of 1939. The ship was the eighth British warship to bear this name, which derives from the name of the Greek mythological hero Ajax. The other two ships that participated in the Battle - Achilles and Exeter - were later honoured in the street names of the town.

Throughout the 1940s, Ajax remained a part of the Pickering Township, and did not have any municipal status. However, the residents of the DIL premises and its surrounding area referred to their community as a "village", and DIL's newsletter The Commando mentioned "Ajax, Ontario" as the place of its publication.

== Workers ==
DIL Ajax's first employee was Sydney Thomas Hopkins, an accountant from Oshawa, who was hired on 21 February 1941 as the Chief Construction Auditor for Carter-Halls-Aldinger. He later became the Chief Clerk of Works, responsible for a variety of tasks including general administration, traffic, stores, and work costs. He also served as the postmaster, representative for the Employees' Medical Plan, Commissioner of Oaths, and a member of the Citizens' Committee.

A week later, DIL hired Alex Russell, the former personnel director at General Motors, and tasked him with hiring and screening the plant personnel. At its peak, the DIL plant would require 9,000 workers to produce over 40 million rounds of shells. The government procured several thousand workers from the General Motors plant in nearby Oshawa. Some of the farmers who had helped with construction also joined the plant once it became operational. Male workers at DIL included several men who were highly educated in engineering or sciences, or were skilled tradesmen. In addition, DIL also hired several men who had been deemed medically unfit to serve in the armed forces. However, these workers were not sufficient to run the plant at its maximum potential. The government had difficulty finding male workers, as many men were serving as soldiers in the war, and several others were engaged in other war industries in the nearby cities like Toronto. Consequently, DIL started hiring women, many of whose husbands were fighting as soldiers in Europe. Women were said to be more suitable for shell-filling because of their "small hands, patience, and attention to detail for repetitive work".

DIL recruiters consulted the National Selection Service registry, which maintained lists of potential labour pools. By September 1940, the NSS registry had identified around 20,000 young, single women across Canada, who were available for immediate hiring in war-related industries. DIL contacted many of these women for its Pickering Works plant, promising them train fare, affordable lodgings and meals. DIL classified potential women workers into four categories, listed in order of most suitable to least suitable: single women and young girls for full-time work, childless married women without home responsibilities for full-time work, childless married women with home responsibilities for part-time work, and women with children for part-time work. Ultimately, unable to find enough workers, DIL offered jobs even to the women with children, who were considered least suitable. No such categorization was done for potential male candidates.

By the end of June 1941, the three all-woman shifts of the Cap & Det Line were producing caps and detonators, which were sent to Britain by air. Rapid construction continued, and eventually, six production lines became active.

The plant still lacked enough workers, and in late 1941, the government appealed the Canadian women to support the war effort. By the end of 1941, the major plant buildings were complete, and the government began national recruiting efforts in the summer of 1942. The DIL hiring teams called prospective women workers by telephone, and also visited places across Canada to hire women workers. Many women saw the job as an opportunity show their patriotism, to earn money, and to see another part of Canada. DIL arranged for the recruited women to travel to Toronto Union Station by train, and from there, to the Pickering Township by a bus. The government would pay for their return home only if they served at the plant for three months or more. The recruits had to undergo two medical examinations and two background checks (by RCMP and OPP).

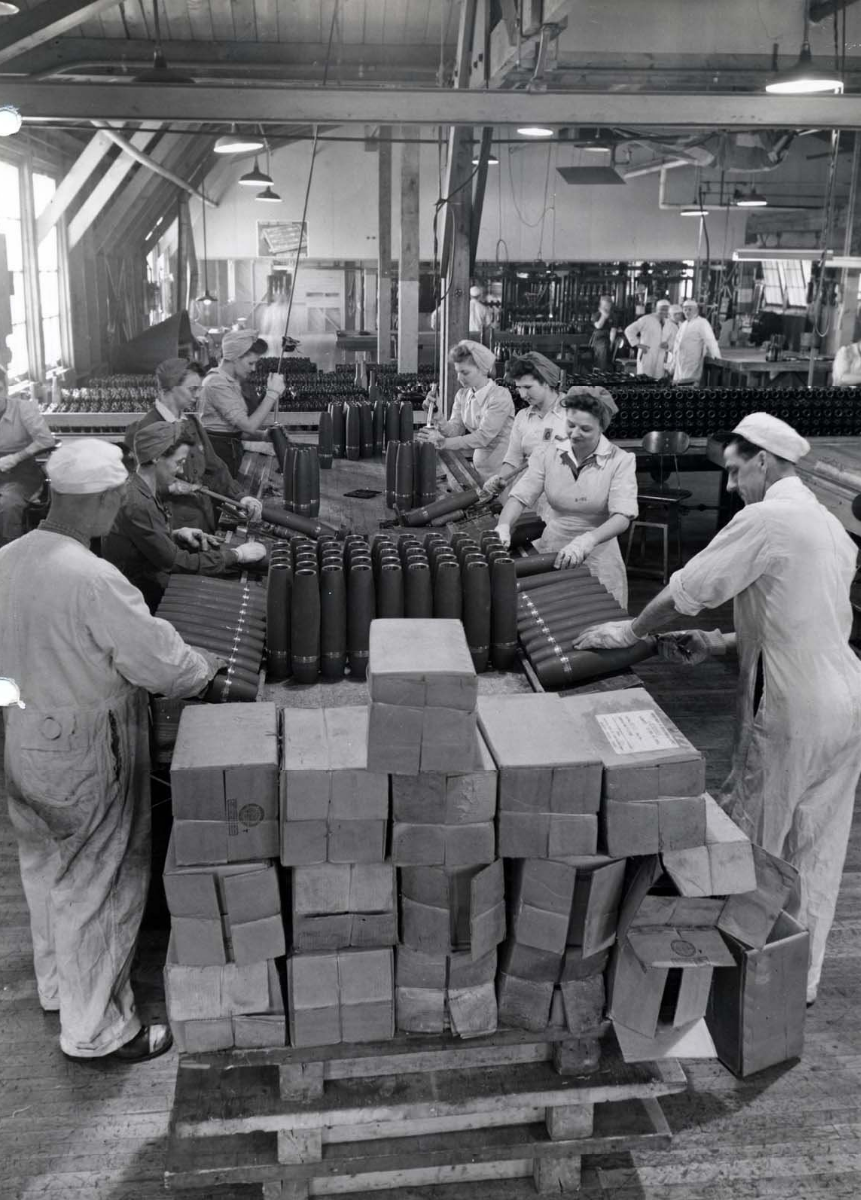
Line 2 - shell cleaning and inspection layout

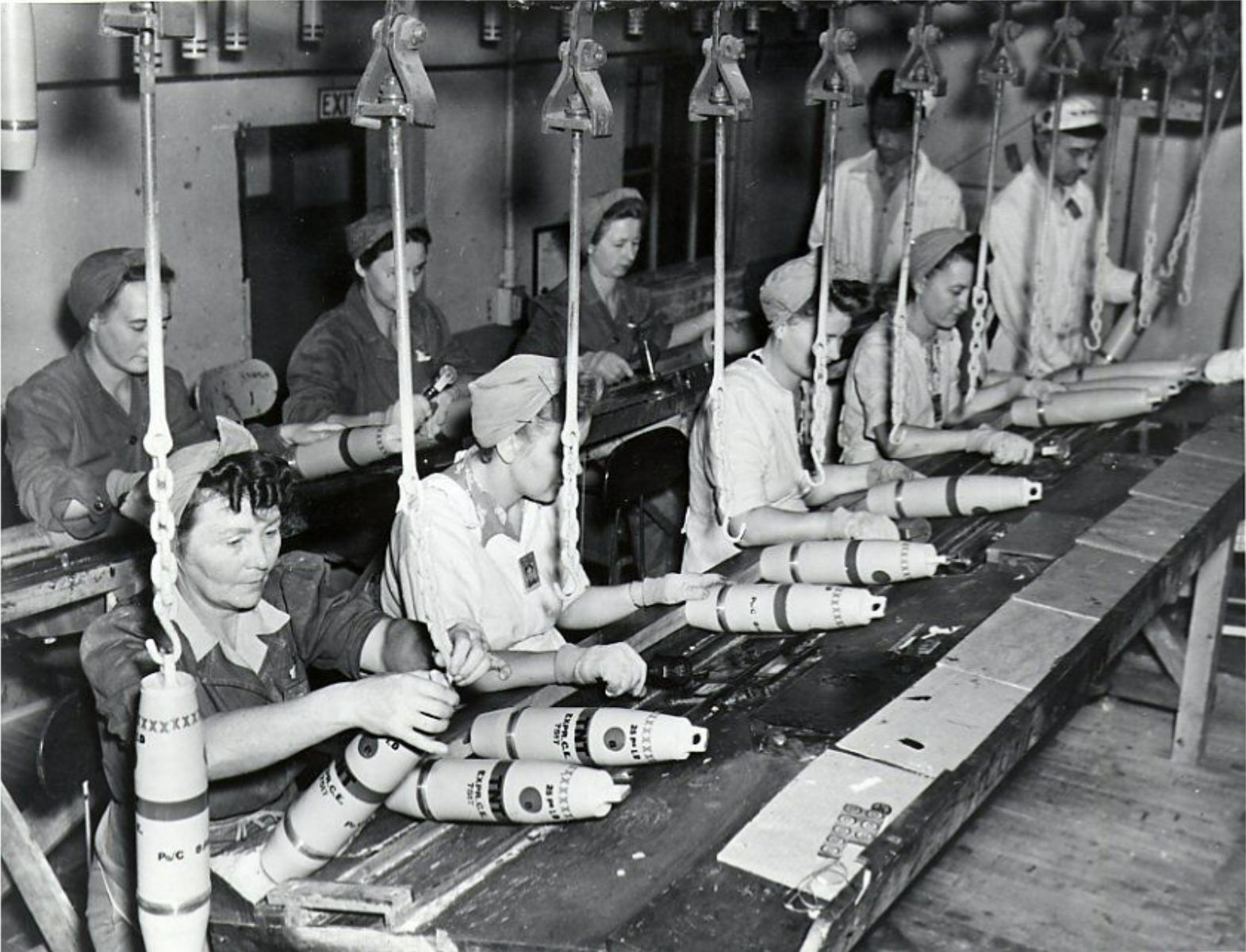
An assembly line

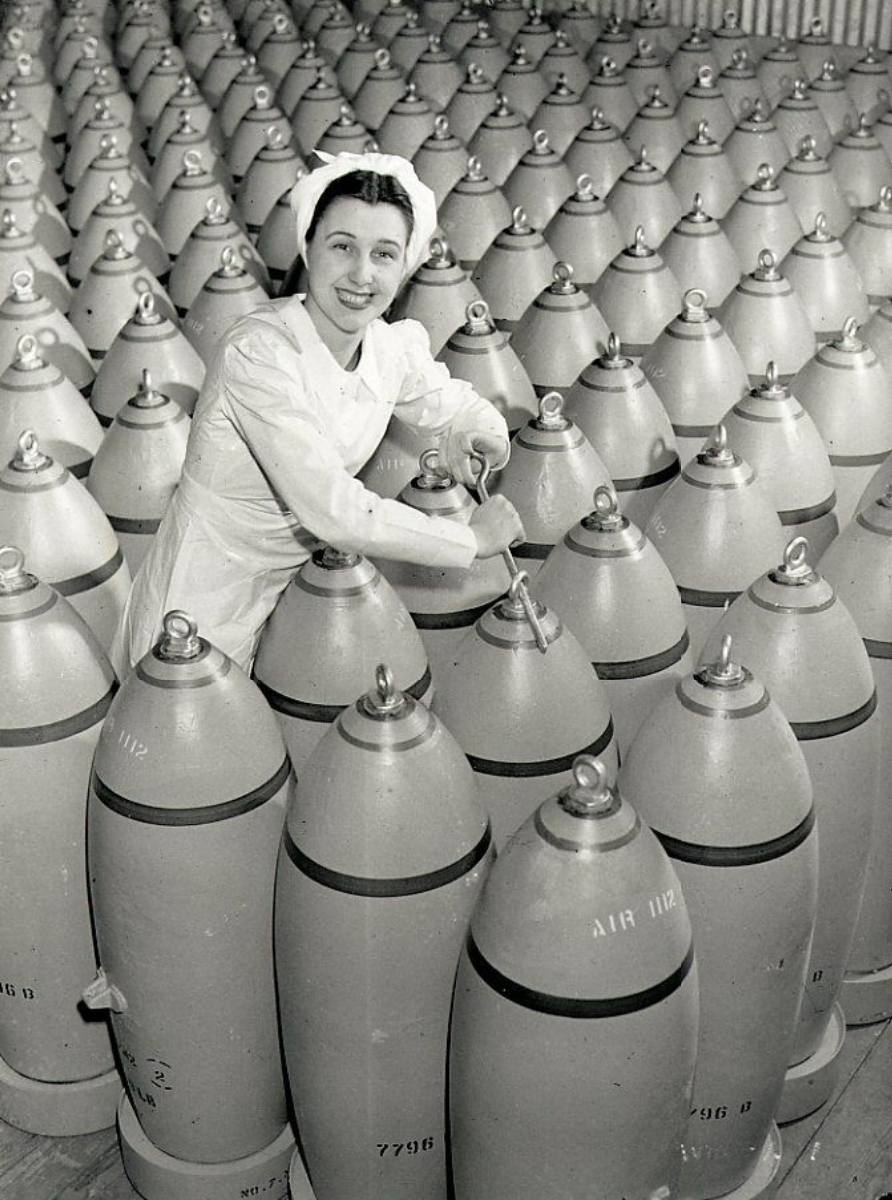
A worker tightens nose plugs of 500-pound bombs

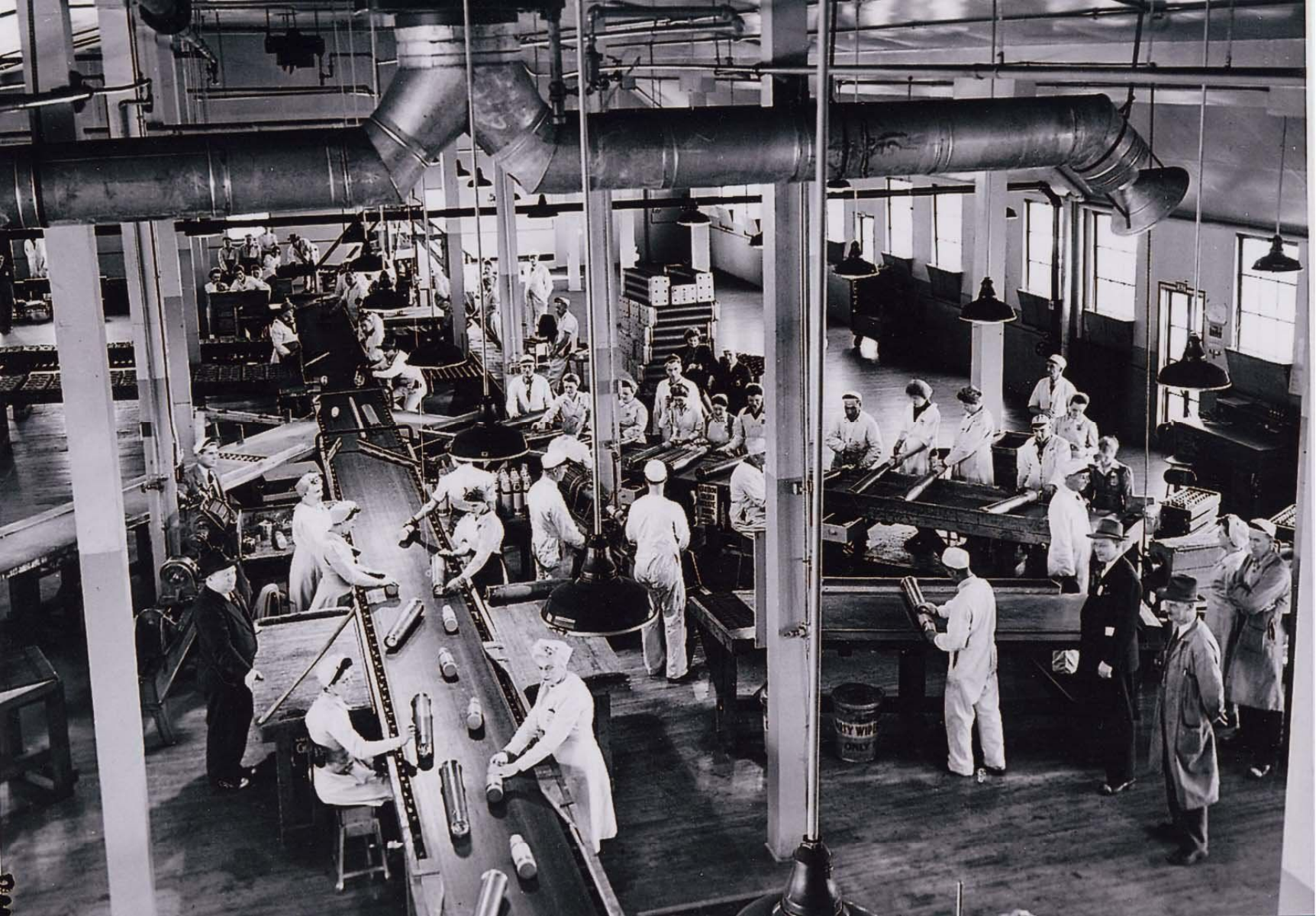
Line 3 - workers assemble 3.7 calibre anti-aircraft shells

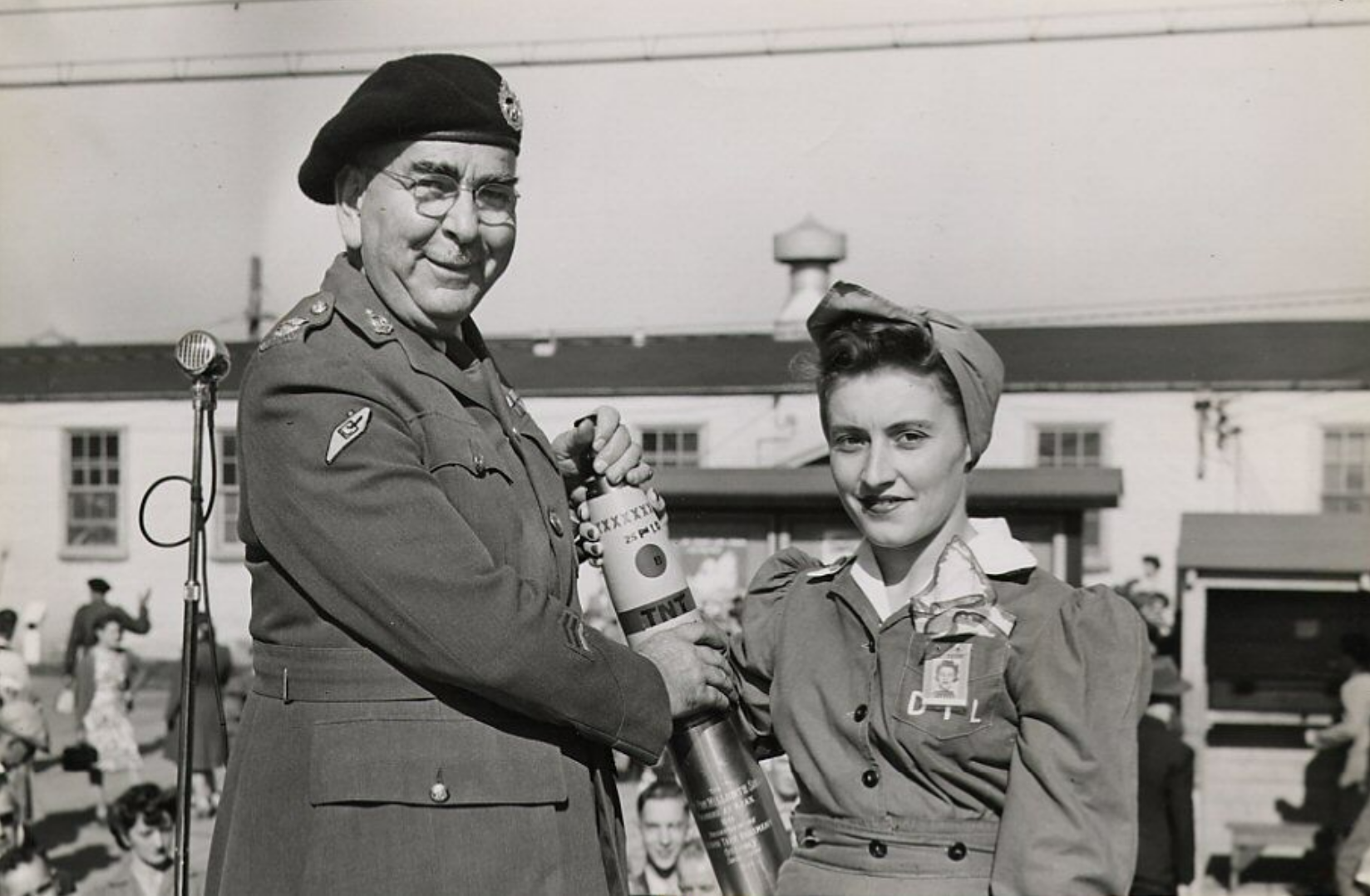
Ceremony celebrating the production of the 25th millionth shell

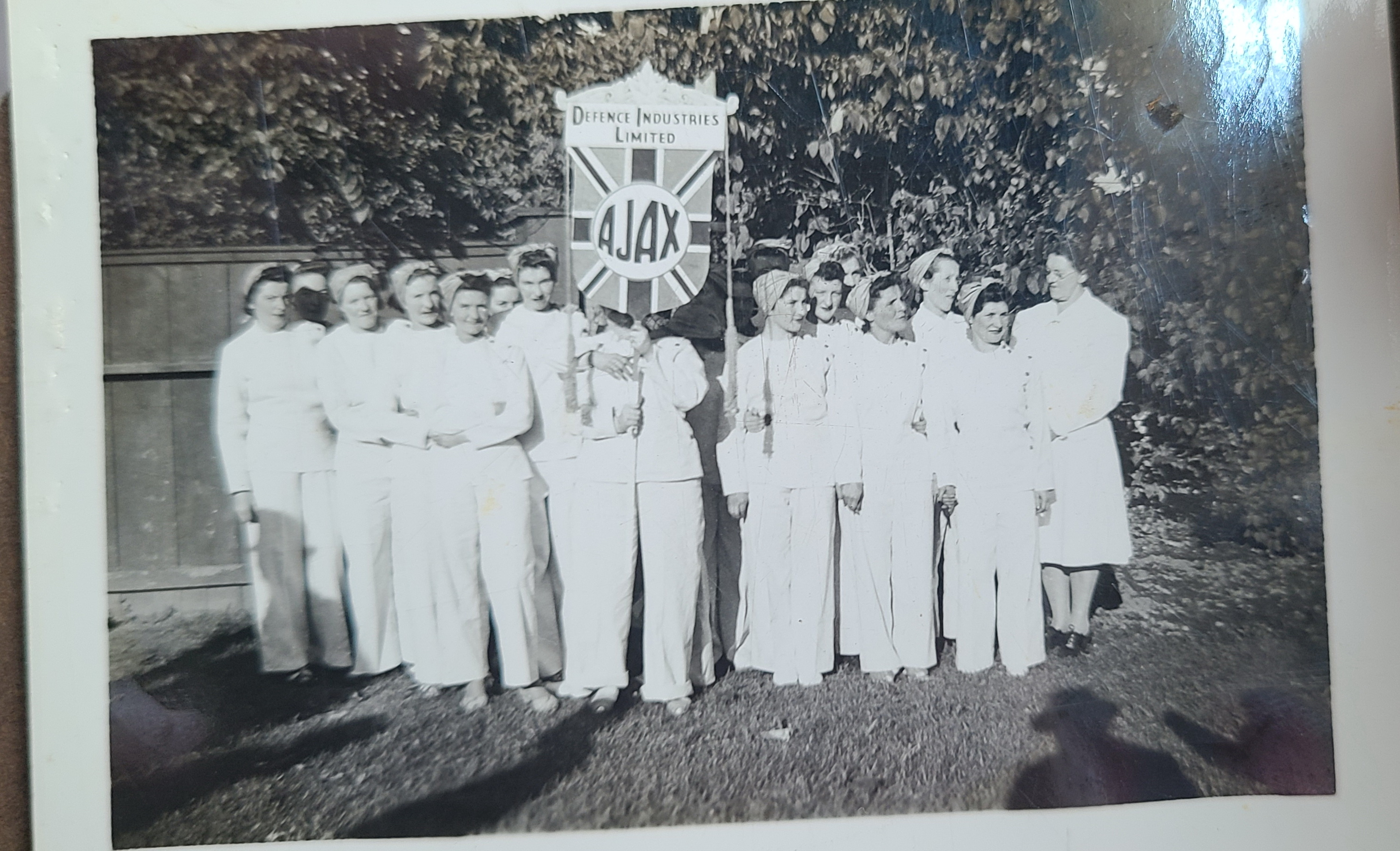
Female workers posing for a photo

The DIL work rooms and tasks were generally segregated by gender. The management generally assigned jobs requiring physical strength, inspection, or supervision to men. Men also did the most dangerous work involving explosives such as amatol and TNT. But, overall, the women vastly outnumbered men at the DIL plant, and by January 1942, the ratio of female to male workers had crossed 2:1.

Number of workers on DIL Ajax production line (1942)
Line	Product	Women	Men
Line 1	40mm anti-aircraft explosive shell loaded with a cordite propellant	742	315
Line 2	25-pound shell	878	562
Line 3	3.7-calibre larger anti-aircraft round	679	514
Line 4	2, 4, and 6-pound anti-tank shells	381	243
Cap & Det	Caps and detonators	984	168
Pellets and tracer	Pellets and tracer rounds	149	56

The majority of the workers were of Anglo-Canadian ancestry. All employees worked eight hours a day, six days a week, which was standard for the time. The DIL records were destroyed when the plant closed, but according to former employees, the men who worked on the production lines earned 71.2 cents per hour, while the women earned around 50 cents per hour for the same job. Despite the inequality, the women's wage was higher than the 1944 Canadian war industry average of 47.9 cents per hour. Several women worked part-time as apple pickers at Redwing Orchards, located at the intersection of Highway 2 and Lakeridge Road.

== Accidents ==
DIL management's reports of injury-free days in The Commando suggest that the plant remained largely accident free. However, according to worker Ken Smith, who later served as the mayor of Ajax, incidents involving minor injuries were common, and there were instances where employees lost fingers or had copper pieces lodged in their abdomen from explosions. There are no formal records of accident statistics at the plant, but at least three deaths have been documented:

- A worker tried to clear a machine blockage while loading gunpowder into leather sacks. He was injured, and returned to work after some time. Subsequently, he tried the same action again, and this time, he caused an explosion that resulted in his death and severe damage to the building. On his deathbed, the employee stated that he had ignored the safety regulations and that the accident was his fault.
- Once, the shells delivered to Line 4 were found to be 1/2000 of an inch too thick, and the excess metal on them needed to be buffed. A worker named Alexander Dodwell used too much pressure during the process, which caused the shell to heat up and explode, resulting in his death and injury to his foreman.
- A male worker and a female worker were seriously injured and hospitalized after an accident at the Pellet and Tracer line. The female victim, a young woman, later died. The accident appears to have been caused by her in the magnesium or gunpowder processing area. There are varying details about the accident, and the exact cause was probably known only to her.

The first two deaths - both of male workers - were documented in a report to minister C. D. Howe on 31 July 1942. Overall, the plant had a low incidence of damage, disability or death, which is remarkable given that most of the workers were relatively unskilled civilians inexperienced in handling explosives.

== Housing ==
Initially, the carpenters and construction workers – all of them men – lived in a tent city. Later, the government built men's residences, which came to be known as the "Men's Camp". The Camp was located at what is now the south-west corner of Harwood Avenue South and Station Street, the site of Ajax Plaza. It had 15 dormitories (each with a capacity of 65 residents), a commissary, a cafeteria, and a barbershop. It was surrounded with barbed wire, and had Stan Mann as the supervisor.

The government built the women's residences south of Highway 401, in the area between what is now Exeter Road in west and Admiral Road in east. The women's compound had 21 residences (each with a capacity of 100 residents), a cafeteria, a beauty shop, and laundry facilities. The residences were built in two rows, with a gravel road separating them. The compound was surrounded by an 8-foot fence with three lines of barbed wire. Each residence had a middle-aged woman as its supervisor, called the "housemother". The site of the women's compound was later used for building the Parkside Public School (which no longer exists) and St. Andrews Community Centre (located at Kings Cres and Exter Rd).

By the summer of 1941, around 3000 workers lived at the DIL residences, but the residences could not accommodate all the workers. Several workers rented houses or rooms from the nearby home owners, who saw this as an opportunity to earn money and to contribute to the war effort.

DIL built a hotel, five detached houses, and three small apartment blocks outside the main compound. The two-storey hotel, named Arbor Lodge, had the capacity to house 250 guests. It accommodated management personnel, inspectors, and some workers who were willing to pay for a higher class of accommodation. The detached houses were for top management officials, while the apartments housed line supervisors and superintendents. These buildings were located on Roosevelt Avenue and Churchill Road.

=== Pre-fabricated houses ===
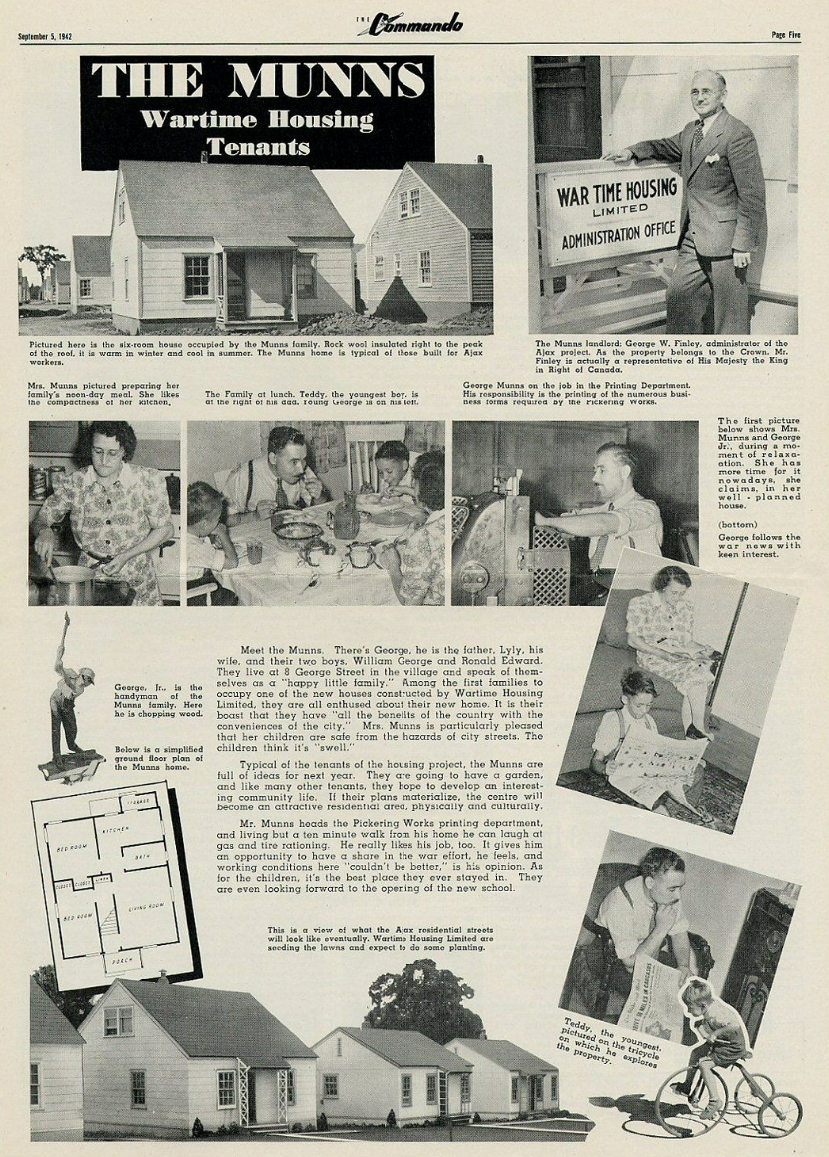
A report in The Commando features a family that rented a house built by WHL

Several married DIL employees with young families did not like living in the DIL residences designed for bachelors, or in boarding houses. They found commuting long distances from their homes elsewhere inconvenient and expensive. In response to their demands, the government approved construction of around 600 houses in Ajax. George Finley, the housing manager, set up an office in an administration building just north of Highway 401.

Wartime Housing Limited (WHL), a crown corporation formed in 1941, built around 600 pre-fabricated houses besides some dormitories, and rented them to the workers. In 1942, the WHL and the Township of Pickering reached an agreement regarding Ajax. According to this agreement, WHL was responsible for constructing houses and for servicing the land with water, sewage, and heating facilities. The Township of Pickering, along with the Ontario County, was responsible for municipal services (e.g. snow plowing) and social welfare. The Township and the County, which had small tax bases in a mainly rural area, found it expensive to cover their responsibilities, although the Ontario Department of Education supported them with education costs.

The housing team selected an area of 125 acres, did a survey of streets, and laid out the lots. Then, they installed sewer, hydro, and water lines. They set up a pre-fab operation on the west side of Harwood Avenue, near the administrator's office. Once the foundation of the house was ready, panels were taken to the site in a truck. At the site, the construction workers assembled the panels to build the floors, walls, partitions, ceilings and roofs of the homes. The houses were not built to last: the plan was to dismantle them after the war, and possibly to ship them to the United Kingdom, to provide shelter for people who had lost their homes during the German bombing.

In January 1942, the construction of houses began north of Highway 401, between Harwood Avenue and Windsor Avenue. The first houses to be finished were located on Mary Street, followed by 100 houses on the east side of Harwood Ave. By July 1942, the applications for renting these houses had exceeded the number of houses available. The construction proceeded westwards, and by the end of 1942, the last houses of the project had been built on the Cheese Factory Road (later Ritchie Road).

The houses had a heating system similar to the contemporary rural houses. The house had coal and wood stoves in the kitchen and the living room. The kitchen stove supplied heat to the hot water tank through a rod built in the wall. The living room stove supplied heat to the rest of the house.

Laundry was done mostly by hand, involving scrubbing clothes on a washboard and drying them on a clothes line, even in the winters. Residents who had moved from Toronto could not use their washing machines in Ajax because of the differences in the electricity supply at the two places. This problem could be solved with new motors, which were not available amid war-induced scarcity.

The newly built houses were called "married quarters", but did not always have married couples living in them. The tenant families included young mothers living with their children (while the father served overseas), and sisters-in-law living together with children (while their husband / brother served overseas). By 1943, many working mothers made use of the government's child care facility in Oshawa, which was managed by a committee led by Mrs. R. S. McLaughlin.

== Facilities ==
=== Post office ===
The frame building for the DIL post office was constructed just outside the plant gates. After the war, the post office moved to the nearby administration offices. After Ajax's first shopping plaza was constructed, it moved to a masonry building in the plaza; the unit was later occupied by Home Hardware. A new post office was constructed on Kings Crescent.

=== Fire services ===
DIL had its own fire department with George Allen as the fire chief. Nearly 4,000 workers were involved in handling explosives. The explosives were stored in warehouses or magazines that were spaced well apart to remain unaffected by an explosion in another building. There was at least one instance of a death by fire or explosion at the plant, but the plant remained generally safe.

=== Recreation ===
In 1941, DIL opened its Ajax Recreation Centre (called "Rec Hall" by the residents), behind the site where the main branch of Ajax Library is now located. Previously, the DIL residents had to catch a bus to Whitby, Oshawa, or Scarborough for watching movies and other entertainment.

The Ajax Recreation Centre had a 14-lane bowling alley, a dance hall, a banquet hall for 60 people, a large kitchen, several small offices and meeting rooms, and a canteen. The canteen served burgers, coffee, soft drinks, and cigarettes. The dance hall had a 16-foot stage, concert organ, footlights, full curtains and a large floor.

Harry Brock was appointed as the program director of the Ajax Recreation Centre. Besides organizing several activities at the Recreation Centre, he also arranged for news and music broadcast for workers on the production lines. At the Recreation Centre, Brock organized performances by well-known entertainers, such as Mart Kenney's band, Guy Lombardo's band, and magician Harry Blackstone Sr. He also promoted Victory Loan drives, and organized a visit by Mary Pickford for the purpose.

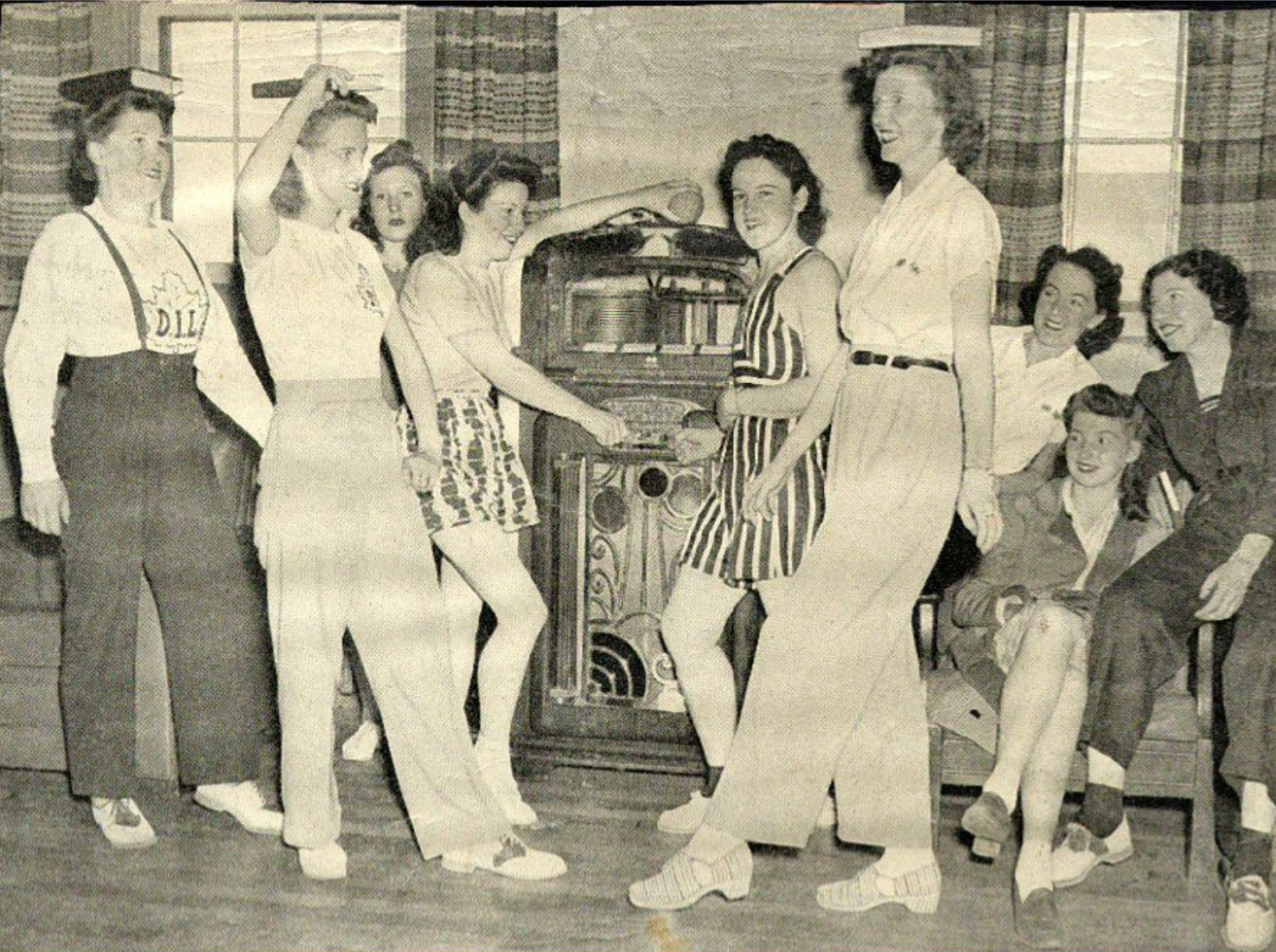
Resident women workers engage in recreational activities

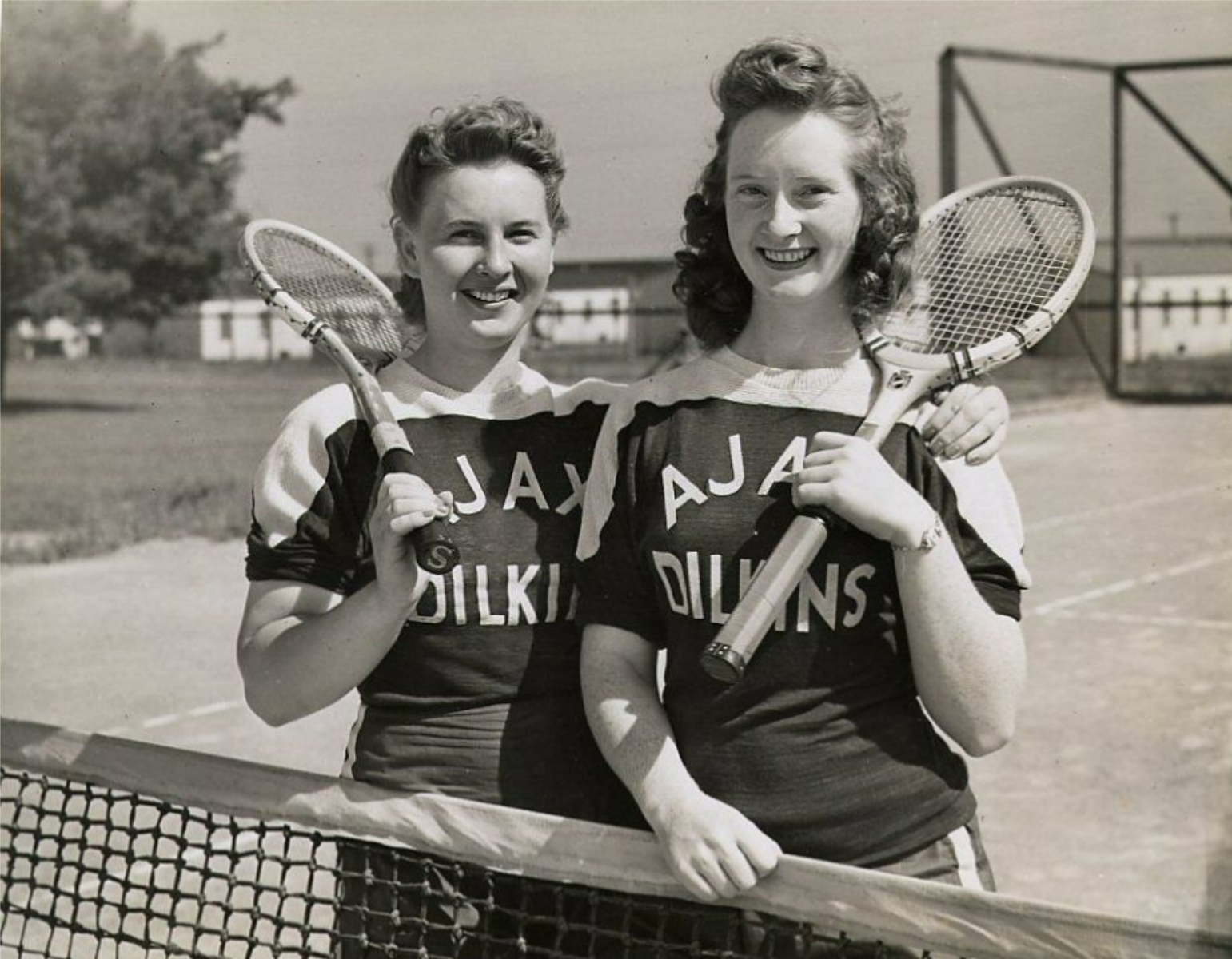
Tennis players from Ajax Dilkins team

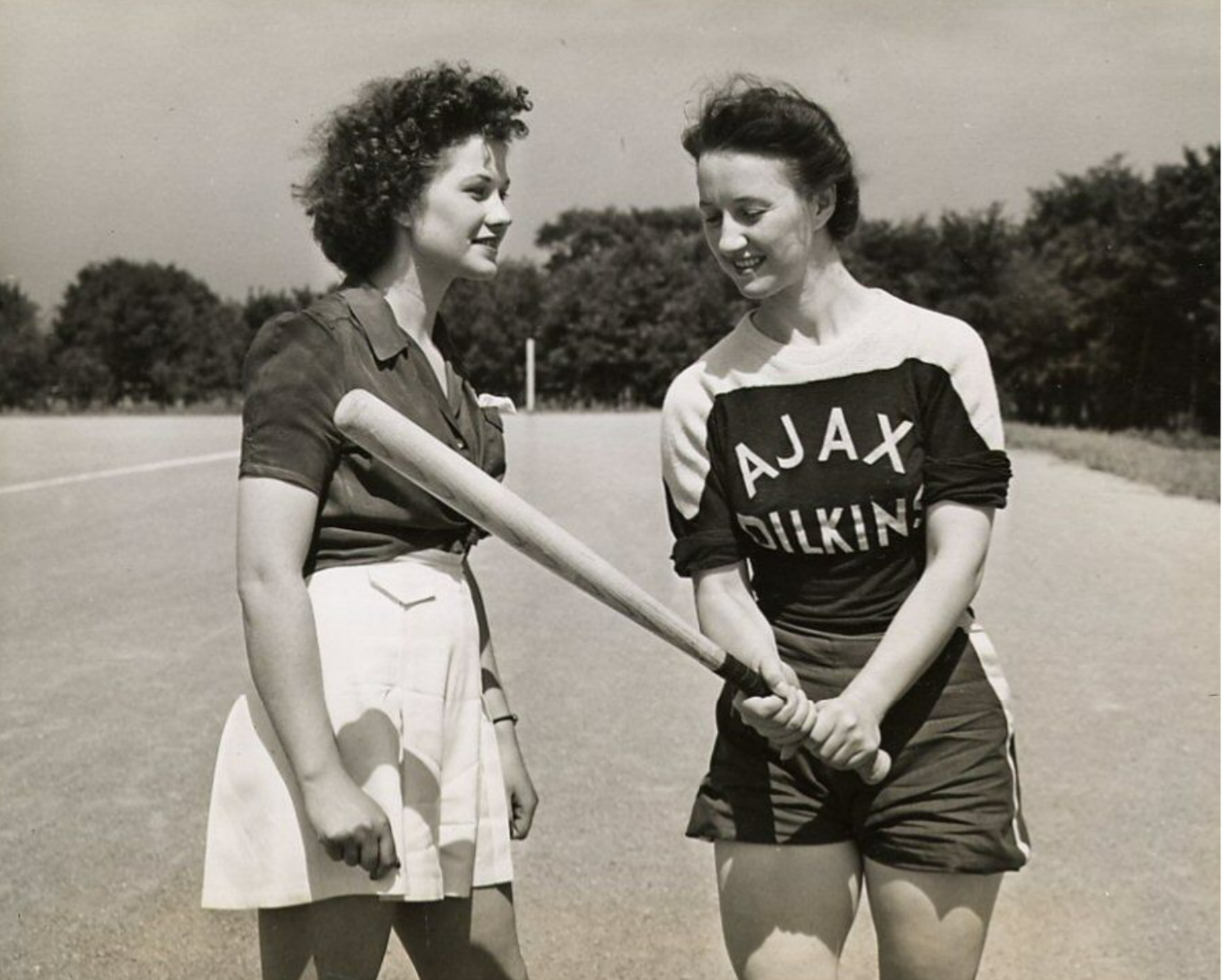
A softball game for benefit of boys from Christie St. Hospital

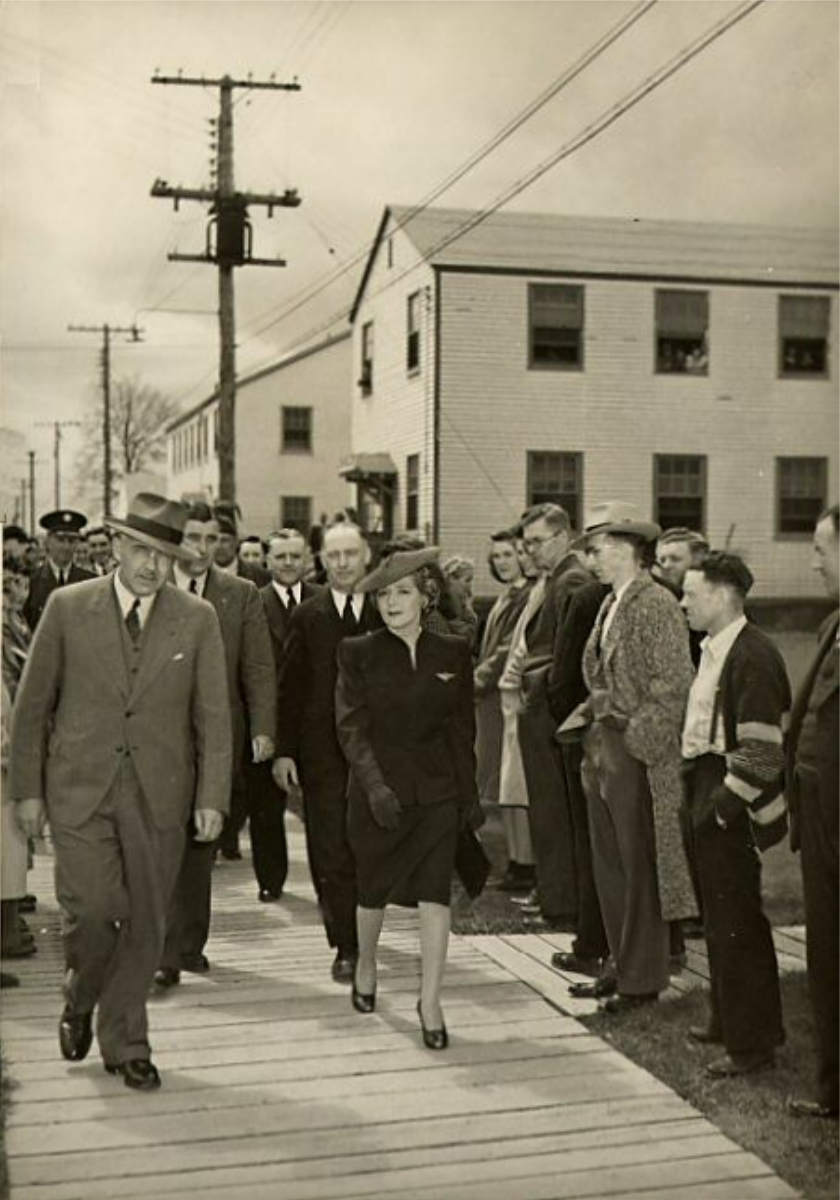
Mary Pickford visits Ajax in 1943

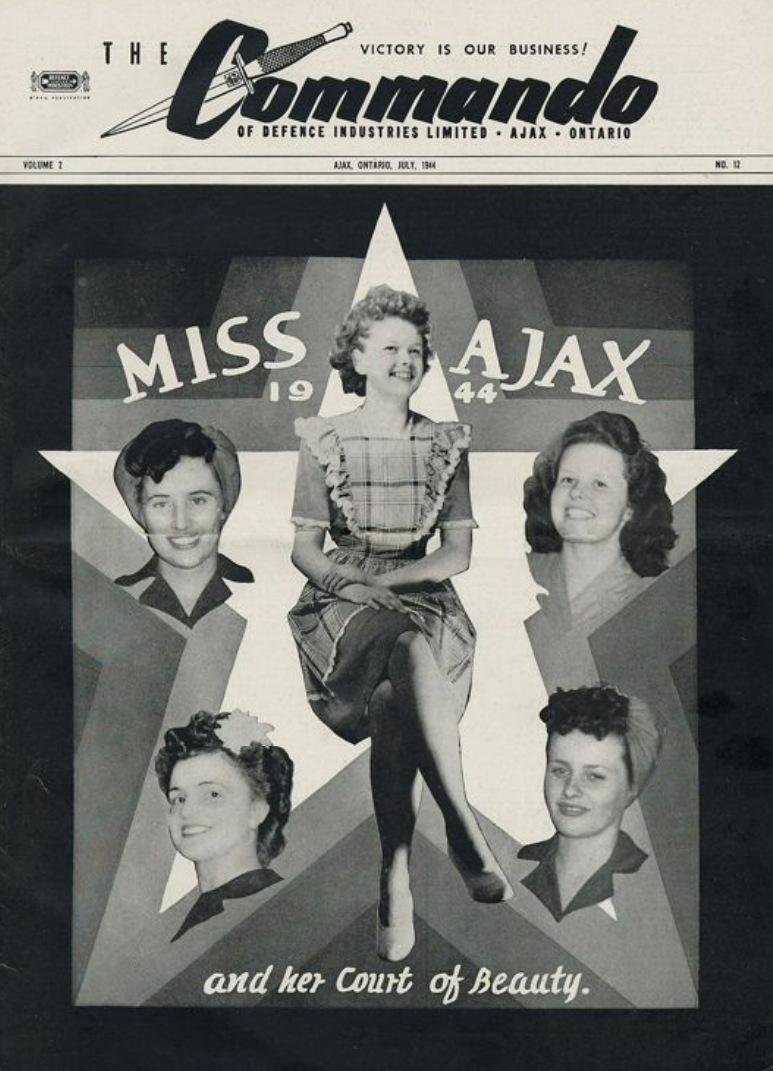
The Commando features Miss Ajax 1944 Betty Welsh

Several other events were held at the Recreation Centre, including amateur hours, movie screenings, square dance evenings, beauty contests, and the annual midsummer competitions. Facilitated by social interaction, several workers entered into romantic relationships, and got married.

Miss Ajax, the local beauty contest for DIL women workers, was a very popular annual event. Its winners included:

- 1942: Irene Brayley of Whitby, who worked on Line 2. She was later placed third in the Toronto Miss War Worker contest sponsored by the Toronto Police Amateur Athletic Association.
- 1943: Sadie Baldwin of Sydney (then living in Ajax dormitory), who worked on Cap & Det.
- 1944: Betty Welsh of Bowmanville, who worked as a government inspector on the Cap & Det Line.

Regular activities at the Recreation Centre included:

- Sports: badminton, basketball, tennis and baseball
- Boxing and wrestling tournaments
- Drama and music clubs
- Stage shows
- Bowling league

The DIL community had its own sports leagues; for example, in July 1942, the softball league had 9 teams.

In 1943, Ajax Community Centre, a family-oriented recreation centre, was built as a small hall for the north-end residents. The Centre hosted activities such as film nights, dances, and church services (first Anglican and later, Baptist).

Several social groups and clubs existed in Ajax. These included the Ajax Horticultural Society, which held its first garden contest in 1943. Sponsored by WHL, the prize was a month's rent. The Ajax Kinsmen Club, which existed from 21 December 1943 to mid-1945, had the highest membership of any Canadian Kinsmen club to that date. Ajax also had a volunteer-run library, which had grown to over 700 books by 1943.

After the closure of DIL, the Ajax Recreation Centre continued to serve the residents of Ajax, before it was destroyed by a fire in 1966. Meanwhile, its director Harry Brock established the Brock's Bowl, a bowling alley on Hardwood Avenue; the alley was later destroyed by fire as well.

=== Health ===
In 1941, the DIL Hospital opened with 12 treatment beds. Its frame building was located at the intersection of Kings Crescent and Exeter Road; the site was later occupied by the Salvation Army Citadel. By 1943, the number of beds had increased to 32, including 10 that could be used for isolation. The DIL Hospital had 5 full-time doctors, 3 part-time doctors, and 15 full-time nurses. It operated 24 hours, just like the plant.

The Hospital offered regular screening of employees who worked with TNT, to check for TNT poisoning. It also conducted the mandatory medical exams for new employees, and kept health records of all the personnel. It operated the Red Cross blood donor service, and maintained a stock of plasma for use in case of serious accidents.

The Hospital also operated the Resident/Employees' Medical Service Plan, which the employees could join for a monthly cost of $1. The medical office was originally located in the basement of the old Presbyterian Church in Pickering. The medical office and the closely aligned employment office were later relocated to Bunting store in the Village, on Kingston Road, just east of the hotel. In May 1941, both offices moved into their own buildings at DIL.

=== Education ===
In August 1942, occupants started moving into the 600 family bungalows constructed outside the DIL premises. At least half of the children in these houses were of school age. However, their families lived on the land owned by the federal government, and therefore, did not pay taxes to contribute towards schooling in the Pickering Township. This made their children ineligible for admission in the nearest schools.

Therefore, WHL built its own eight-room schoolhouse. The school opened for classes on 10 October 1942, with 208 elementary students, and was named Lord Elgin School on December 22. Earl Webster served as its first principal, followed by Graham Pinkney. The school became a meeting point for several groups, including the town's first Girl Guides and the first Boy Scouts. Adult education classes were held at the school in evening.

Among adults, several DIL employees enrolled in courses for vocational and other speciality training, such as typing. The Government also courses related to military and war industry, as part of the War Emergency Training Program. These courses aimed to train workers in various skills needed by the armed forces in case need for enlistment rose.

=== Retail ===
When the first occupants moved into the newly constructed houses in August 1942, there was no grocery store in the area. The nearest grocery stores were the Red & White Store in Pickering Village, and A&P in Whitby. Most residents of Ajax did not have cars to travel to these stores, and relied on door-to-door peddlers (who required a license), or home deliveries. Peddlers delivered bread, milk and ice daily.

The Red & White had red boxes nailed to trees at the street corners: the residents would deposit their grocery lists in these boxes; a driver picked up the lists and delivered the groceries each afternoon. Major companies such has Eaton's also delivered groceries and catalogue items to Ajax.

In October 1942, a local Citizens' Committee was formed to establish a grocery store and a church. The Committee successfully organized negotiations between WHL and Ross Murison, the owner of Red & White. Consequently, in May 1943, Murison opened Ajax Marketeria, the first grocery store in the DIL area of Ajax. Operated by Murison using locally hired staff, it was located in a large frame building, on the site later occupied by the Petro Canada gas station. Besides groceries, it also sold a small selection of clothing and other dry goods.

The Bank of Commerce had a branch in Ajax.

=== Transit ===
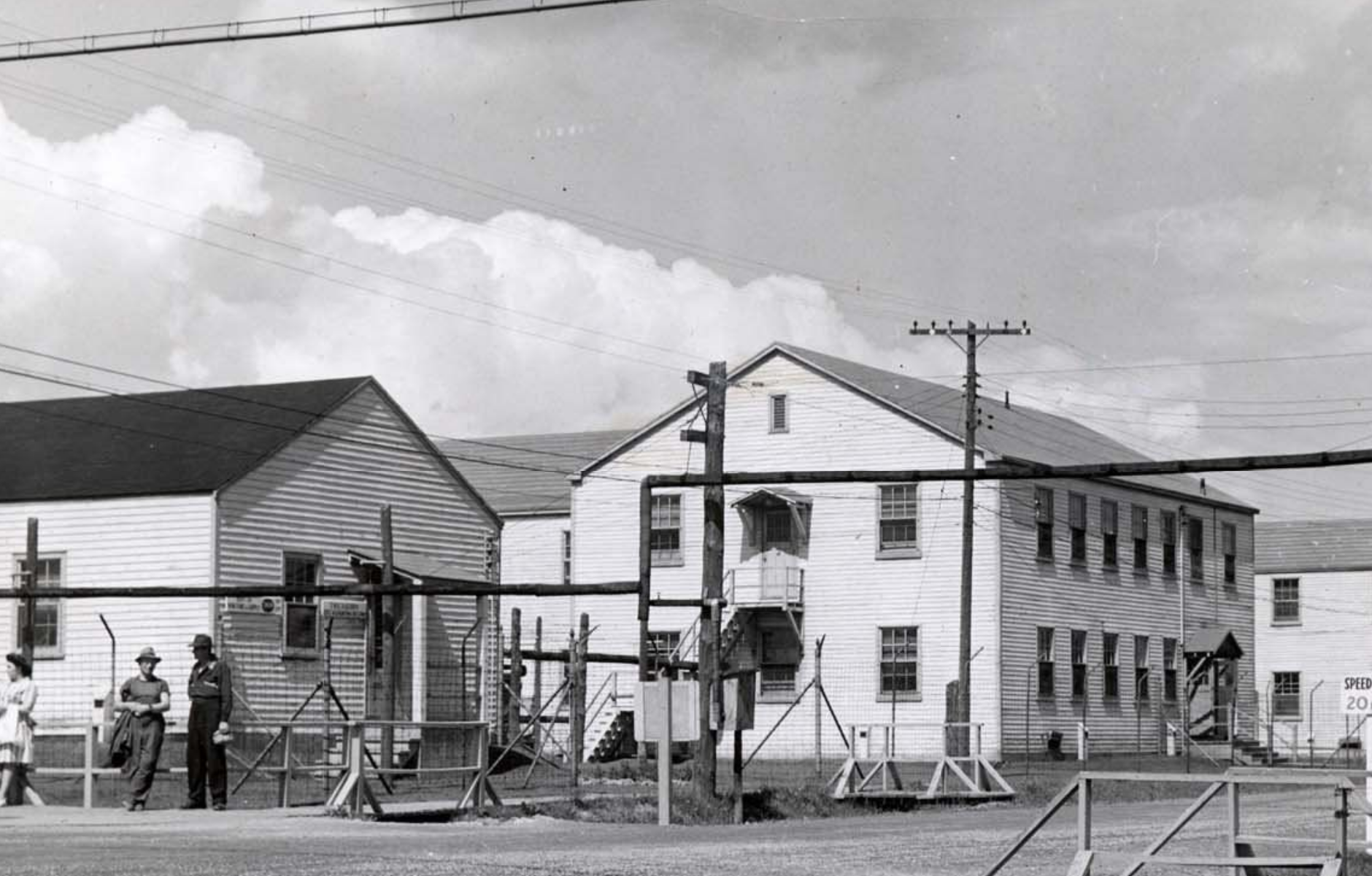
DIL employees wait for a bus on Harwood Ave and King's Cres

Most of the workers who lived far from the plant commuted by the crowded Gray Coach buses, which traveled along Highway 2 between Oshawa and Toronto. The buses dropped them off at Harwood Avenue, from where they could reach the plant by walking, riding a "cattle car", or catching lift from passing motorists.

The "cattle cars" were DIL-provided transportation for employees living in outlying areas not served by public transport. Most of the "cattle cars" were trailers pulled by tractor trucks, and also transported workers to and from various locations within the plant. They were so called because they were very crowded, and the employees were packed like cattle inside them; women workers often complained about being squeezed among men. In good weather, many employees preferred walking to riding in the crowded and bumpy cattle cars.

=== Media ===
The Commando, a semi-monthly newsletter, was published from May 1942 until the end of the war. As a government publication, it was "designed to regulate employee attitudes and behaviour", encouraging them to work towards the war effort. For example, when the Allies neared victory in 1943, the government was concerned about a decline in patriotic attitude and was concerned about losing female workers, who were considering other lucrative job opportunities. At that time, The Commando reported that DIL was planning to introduce paid vacation for its employees. Besides government propaganda, The Commando also carried gossipy sections and uplifting humour.

=== Worship ===
Many Christian DIL employees felt the need for organized worship, amid the worry and fear caused by the war. During 1941-1942, ministers from various Christian denominations conducted services in the Ajax Recreation Centre. These included M. R. Jenkinson of Pickering United Church and the E. G.Robinson of St. George's Anglican Church.

In response to the residents' demands for a church and a grocery store, George Finley advocated the formation of a local Citizens' Committee. In October 1942, 12 men and one woman were elected as the Committee members, with printer George Munns as the chairperson. The Committee loaned a portable frame structure from the United Church. It was set up on east side of Harwood Ave, on a provided by farmer William Heron for one dollar. On January 31, 1943, the Ajax Church was dedicated at the site. It was not large enough to accommodate all the parishioners, some of whom had to observe ceremonies from outside the doors.

== Closure and aftermath ==
After the entry of the United States in the war in late 1941, the demand for shells from the Ajax plant reduced. In late 1942 and early 1943, there was a reduction in shifts, resulting in transfers and layoffs. Production at DIL slowed down substantially in the winter of 1944, as the Allied victory in the World War II seemed assured and the demand for shells declined further. In the summer of 1945, all production lines were abandoned, and most of the workers were dismissed. A few worked until the summer of 1946, for tasks such as compiling an operating procedures manual, identifying records to be retained, destroying the other records, dismantling the equipment, and cleaning up the plant.

Buildings contaminated by explosives were burned, and others were demolished. All records, including those related to the personnel and the work at the plant, were shredded. A manual of operations, documenting the technologies used and dangers encountered, was compiled for possible future reference. Three copies of manuals were distributed to the CIL, the Ontario government, and the Public Archives of Canada. The material from dismantled buildings was sold to contractors, and was used for new construction within Ajax. For example, the material from the Arbor Lodge was used to build three houses.

Many men released from DIL found work at General Motors in Oshawa, as the auto industry revived after the war. The government encouraged women to discontinue work and take up roles as housemakers.

Towards the end of the war, Ajax became a warehousing location for the War Assets Corporation, which was responsible for disposing of the government-owned surplus material and property from World War II. A War Surplus sales outlet was established at the site to dispose off the production equipment and other fixtures.

During 1946-1949, the University of Toronto ran its Ajax Division in some of the vacant DIL buildings, to accommodate increased demand for engineering education, especially from the returning war veterans. During 1949-1953, the former women's residences were used as a holding camp, called the Displaced Persons Camp (or "DP Camp"), for refugees arriving from post-war Europe.

After the end of the war, the government decided to liquidate WHL, as part of a policy to minimize its intervention in the housing market. The government gave the renters of WHL in Ajax an opportunity to buy their homes with 10% down payment and a 25-year mortgage. The house prices ranged between $2,500 and $3,300. These terms were attractive to many renters, who became homeowners.

Most of the workers left the town when their jobs ended, but several decided to remain in Ajax. Around 600 renting families lived in houses that were built to last for five years. When a federal official came to Ajax and talked about tearing the houses down, the residents protested. Some residents went to Queen's Park in Toronto to petition the government. During 1945-1951, many of the residents lived in uncertainty, as there were talks of close down the community, and predictions that the community would turn into a ghost town or farming land.

The government ultimately bowed to public pressure, acknowledging the demands of the residents, and the need for housing from the incoming married University students. The government gave the tenants the first opportunity to buy the houses in which they were living. The buyers were given the option of having a permanent masonry foundation or a basement installed. For the basement, the buyer had to pay an additional cost, which could be negotiated directly with the contractor. Most residents opted for a basement.

The Government transferred the DIL property to CMHC, with George Finley (the former CMHC housing manager) as its administrator. Finley was given the mandate to develop Ajax into a planned modern industrial town. The community eventually evolved into the town of Ajax.

Bomb Girls (2012-2013), a Canadian television drama, was based on accounts of workers from the DIL Ajax and the GECO Scarborough plants. In 2016, the town of Ajax hosted a celebratory gala to celebrate the 75th anniversary of DIL Ajax's establishment. The event was attended by some of the surviving DIL Ajax female workers, and the actors and producers of Bomb Girls.

== See also ==
- Canadian women in the World Wars
- History of Ajax, Ontario
