= CIL Building =

Historic Building in Toronto

Coordinates: 43°40′10.1″N 79°23′33.6″W

The CIL Building is a fourteen-storey office tower located at 130 Bloor Street West in Toronto, Ontario. Designed by the architectural firm Bregman and Hamann and completed in 1960, the building is one of Toronto's best examples of International Style architecture. The CIL building is best known for its two-storey penthouse, which was originally occupied by businessman Noah Torno and is now a designated historic property.

== History ==
Built for Canadian Industries Limited, the CIL building's construction was financed by the Bronfman family's holding company, Cemp Investments. The building was designed by the Toronto firm Bregman and Hamann, which was founded in 1953 by Sidney Bregman and George Hamann. Their design showcases the hallmark of the International Style - the curtain wall - with a glass grade-level storefront.

In 2005 the CIL Building was purchased King Street Capital, who shortly thereafter announced their intention to undertake a major addition to the building. The addition was designed by Toronto firm Quadrangle Architects, led by Brian Curtner. This construction saw the addition of seven storeys of on top of the penthouse, as well as the removal of the large sections of the eleventh and twelfth floors. The addition was completed in 2009. Although this heavily obscured its exterior, the interior of the penthouse was not allowed to be modified due to its historic designation. The 11th and 12th floors were constructed as condominiums, and the remaining are listed as office space.

Local newspaper YongeStreet speculated as to the nature of the building's residents, as the apartments in the building were rumored to run as high as $25 million.

== Torno Penthouse ==
Above the twelve-storey office tower is a two-storey penthouse, which has a separate entrance at 155 Cumberland Street. The penthouse was originally occupied by Noah Torno (d. 2004), a businessman who worked in the brewing industry for the Bronfman family, and his wife Rose Laine Torno (d. 2002). In addition to his from his professional career, Torno dedicated much of his time to philanthropic and cultural endeavours in Toronto, at various times working for the Royal Ontario Museum, O'Keefe Centre, Toronto Symphony Orchestra, and Mount Sinai Hospital. The penthouse is structured as two offset rectangles, is clad in black brick, and features floor-to-ceiling windows on the south-facing side of the structure. It has been alleged that Torno hired American architect Philip Johnson to design the interior, although this has not been proven. Globe and Mail architecture critic John Bentley Mays claimed in an article that, according to Brian Curtner of Quadrangle Architects, there is nothing in Johnson's papers that mentions the project, and there is only one piece of evidence that indicates Johnson and Torno knew one another. In addition, photographs of the penthouse appear in the Panda Associates Collection at the Canadian Architectural Archives which name Gordon Adamson as the designer. The Architectural Conservatory of Toronto lists Philip Johnson, not Gordon Adamson, as the designer. Because of its size, historical clout, and unobstructed views over Queen's Park, the Torno Penthouse is now one of the country's most expensive properties.

=== Interior design ===
A 2012 National Post article listed the penthouse as 10,000 square feet with an additional 5,000 feet in various terraces. The interior is described as having travertine walls imported from the Bufalini quarry in Italy, as well as 400 year old oak paneling in the library.

John Bentley Mays for The Globe and Mail wrote,

The Torno suite ... is a notable instance of mid-century American modernist ideas put to work in a luxurious residential setting. The plain, elegant staircase connecting the two floors of the apartment floats upward from a stern, skylit entry hall floored and walled with travertine, the light beige stone that was always power-style modernism's favourite indicator of swankiness. The 11-foot planes of floor-to-ceiling glass on the exterior walls dramatically light the stately main-floor rooms, which are trimmed in handsomely cut and finished oak.
