= William McMaster (businessman) =

Canadian businessman (1851–1930)

- Born: 10 June 1851; Montreal, Quebec
- Died: 5 May 1930 (aged 78); Montreal, Quebec
- Spouse: Lucy Huntington Atwater Greene (m. 1877)

William McMaster (10 June 1851 – 5 May 1930) was a Canadian businessman who had two successful careers. McMaster was born in Montreal on June 10, 1851 and married Lucy A. Greene from Vergennes, Vermont on September 18, 1877. He died in Montreal on May 5, 1930 at the age of 78. The municipality of McMasterville in southwestern Quebec was named after him.

== Career ==
McMaster served 35 years at the Montreal Rolling Mills and retired as managing director in 1910 at the time of the formation of the Steel Company of Canada (later "Stelco"). The Steel Company was created from the amalgamation of the Montreal Rolling Mills; the Hamilton Steel and Iron Company; the Canada Screw Co.; the Canada Bolt and Nut Co. and the Dominion Wire Manufacturing Co.

In 1911, he was appointed the first President of Canadian Explosives Ltd and served as President until 1925. Canadian Explosives was formed as the result of a 1911 merger by DuPont and the Nobel Dynamite Trust of the Hamilton Powder Co. and other dynamite and powder interests in Canada.

During his business career, McMaster also served as President of Montreal Telegraph Company; Vice-President of Belding Corticelli Ltd.; Vice-President of Dominion Glass Co. Ltd.; Vice-President of The Guarantee Company of North America and Vice-President of Asbestos Corporation of Canada Ltd. He was also a Director of the Bank of Montreal; Sherwin Williams Co. Ltd.; Canada Paint Co. Ltd.; Consumers Cordage Co. Ltd.; Penman's Limited; Paton Manufacturing Co. and the British and Mercantile Insurance Co.
