= GECO =

Munitions plant

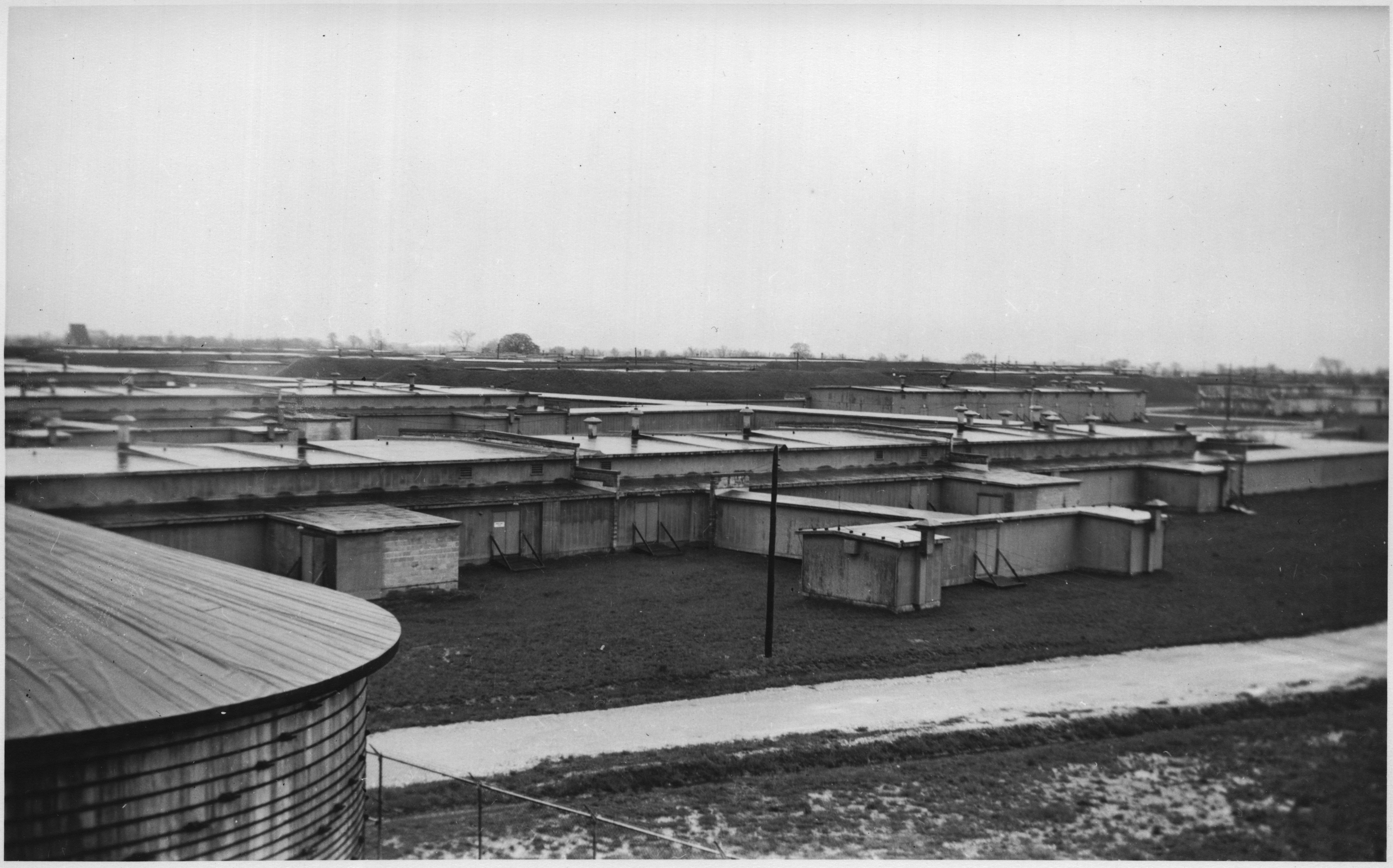
General Engineering Company (Canada) munitions factory

The General Engineering Company of Ontario (GECO, pronounced: "Gee-ko") was a munitions plant located in Scarborough, Ontario, and owned by the Government of Canada. Between July 1941 to July 1945, GECO filled more than 256 million units of ammunition for the Government of Canada. GECO is named after its builder and operator, General Engineering Company (Canada) Limited. The Scarborough GECO munitions plant was also known as "Project No. 24", and "Scarboro". It spanned 172 buildings. Following the Second World War, some of the buildings were used for emergency housing.

== History ==
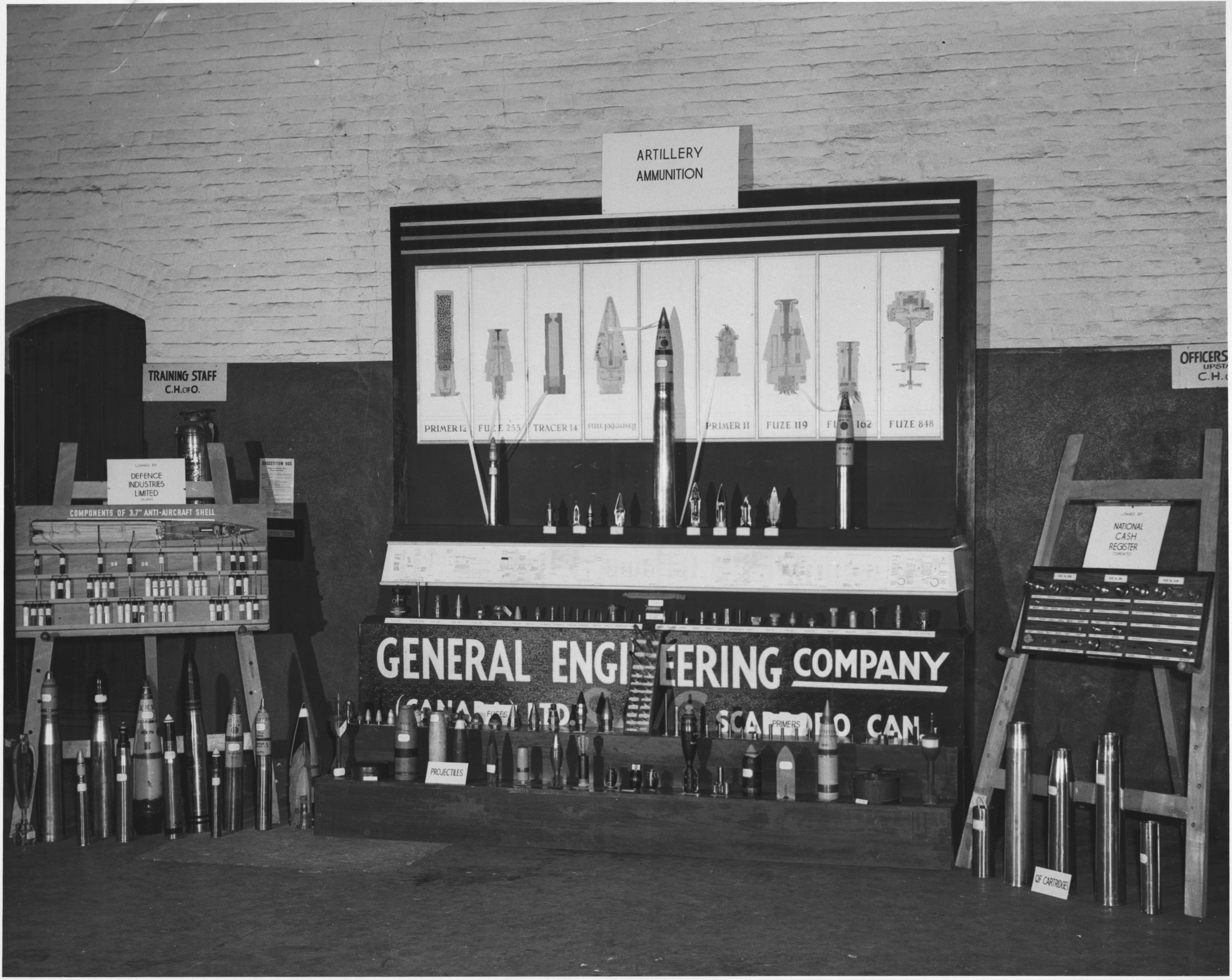
Display of artillery and ammunition produced by the General Engineering Company (Canada)

In 1940, the Allied War Supplies Corporation (AWSC) contracted General Engineering Company (Canada) Limited to build a fuse filling plant (Project No. 24). The 172 buildings included a bank, a guardhouse, a medical centre, a cafeteria, changing houses, a chemical lab, a power plant, carpentry shops, and more. The munitions plant was divided into the 'clean' and 'dirty' side, dividing the area used for handling explosives from that of the safe area. GECO spanned 345 acres of land. The construction of the munitions plant cost over $7 million which was more than the initial estimate of $2.25 million.

The GECO plant was overseen by Robert Mclean Prior Hamilton (GECO's president) and his brother Philip Dawson Prior Hamilton (Vice-President of GECO).

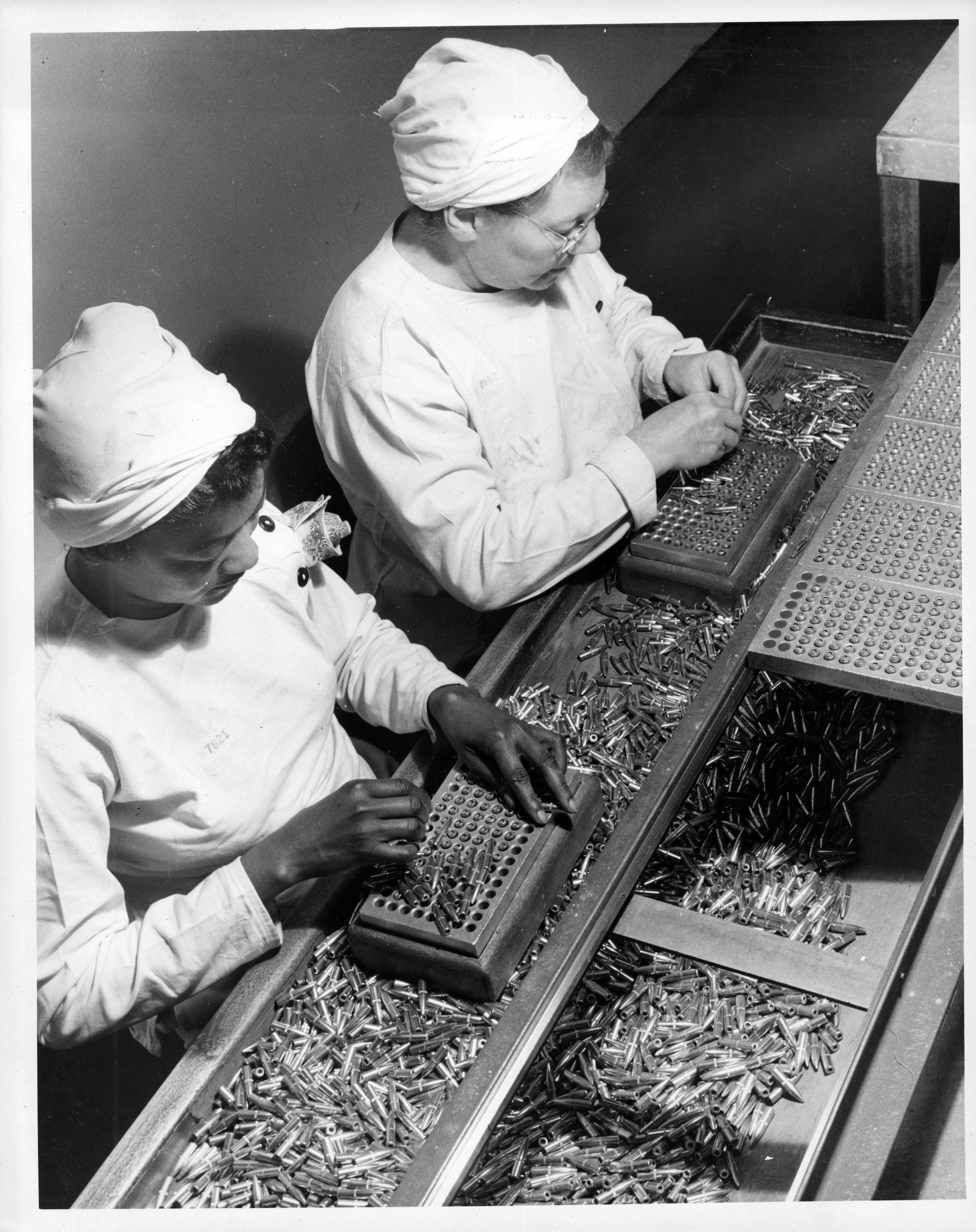
Operators traying based bullets for tip lacquering

A large percentage of GECO employees during World War II were women. Later on during the war most of the employees were women. The GECO employees who worked with ammunition earned the nicknames "Bomb Girl", "Munitionette", "Fusilier", and "Munitions Gal". Often the tetryl powder that they worked with resulted in yellowed hair and hands. This made it easy to spot who worked at GECO. The cotton uniforms the employees wore was specially designed to reduce static and protect skin from the dust from tetryl powder that could cause rashes. Part of the uniform was a turban or head covering worn to cover the head to prevent accidents with machinery. When crossing from the 'dirty to the 'clean' side of the factory, the employees were inspected for any prohibited items such as metal or matches. The employees on the 'dirty' side were also not allowed to wear anything with metal because of the risk of an explosion.

Workers at GECO had the option of joining the GECO Recreation Club, using the laundry services, the daycare services and gardening in the Victory Gardens. GECO published an employee magazine called the GECO Fusilier. GECO employees were also encouraged to participate in Miss War Worker that was sponsored by the Toronto Police Amateur Athletic Association. GECO hosted its own pin-up contest in 1943.

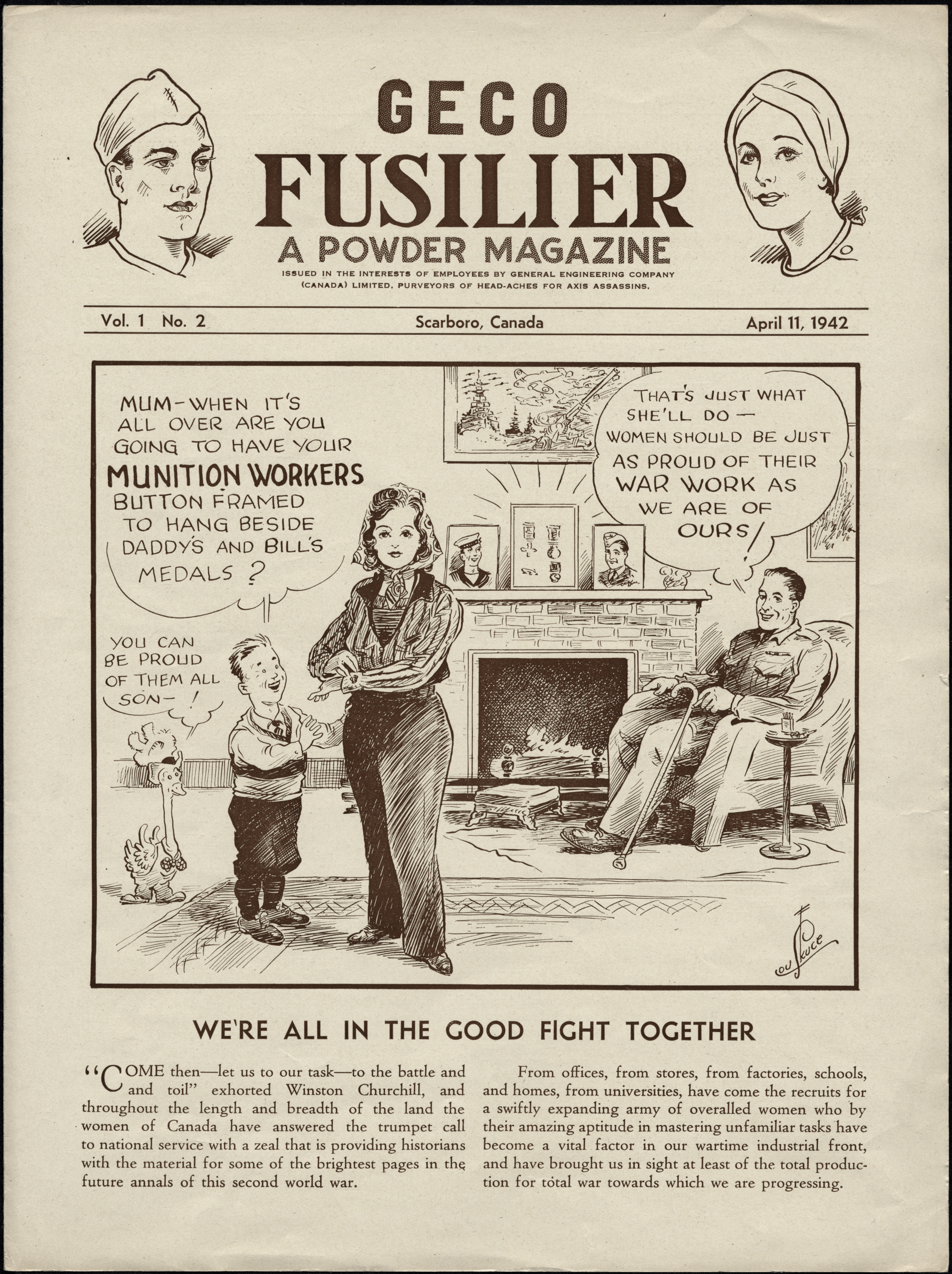
GECO Fusilier Magazine Vol. 1 No. 2

Visitors to the GECO munitions factory included: Mary Pickford, Alexander Cambridge, 1st Earl of Athlone, and Andrew McNaughton.

After World War II, between 1945 and 1954, some of the GECO buildings were used for emergency housing. Twenty of the GECO buildings are still visible in Scarborough. The site where GECO used to be was bought by the township of Scarborough in 1948 and now is part of the Golden Mile. GECo Park in a new subdivision in the area is named in honour of the company.

Bomb Girls (2012–2013), a Canadian television drama, was based on accounts of workers from the DIL Ajax and the GECO plants.
