= Robic (surname) =

Robic or Robič is the surname of the following people:

- Antony Robic (born 1986), French football midfielder
- Geneviève Robic-Brunet (born 1959), Canadian road racing cyclist
- Ivo Robić (1923–2000), Croatian singer and songwriter
- Jean Robic (1921–1980), French road racing cyclist
- John Robic (born 1963), American basketball coach
- Jure Robič (1965–2010), Slovenian cyclist and soldier
- Mylène Dinh-Robic (born 1979), Canadian actress
- Sašo Robič (1967–2010), Slovenian alpine skier
- Xavier Robic (born 1979), French actor
