= Duffins Creek =

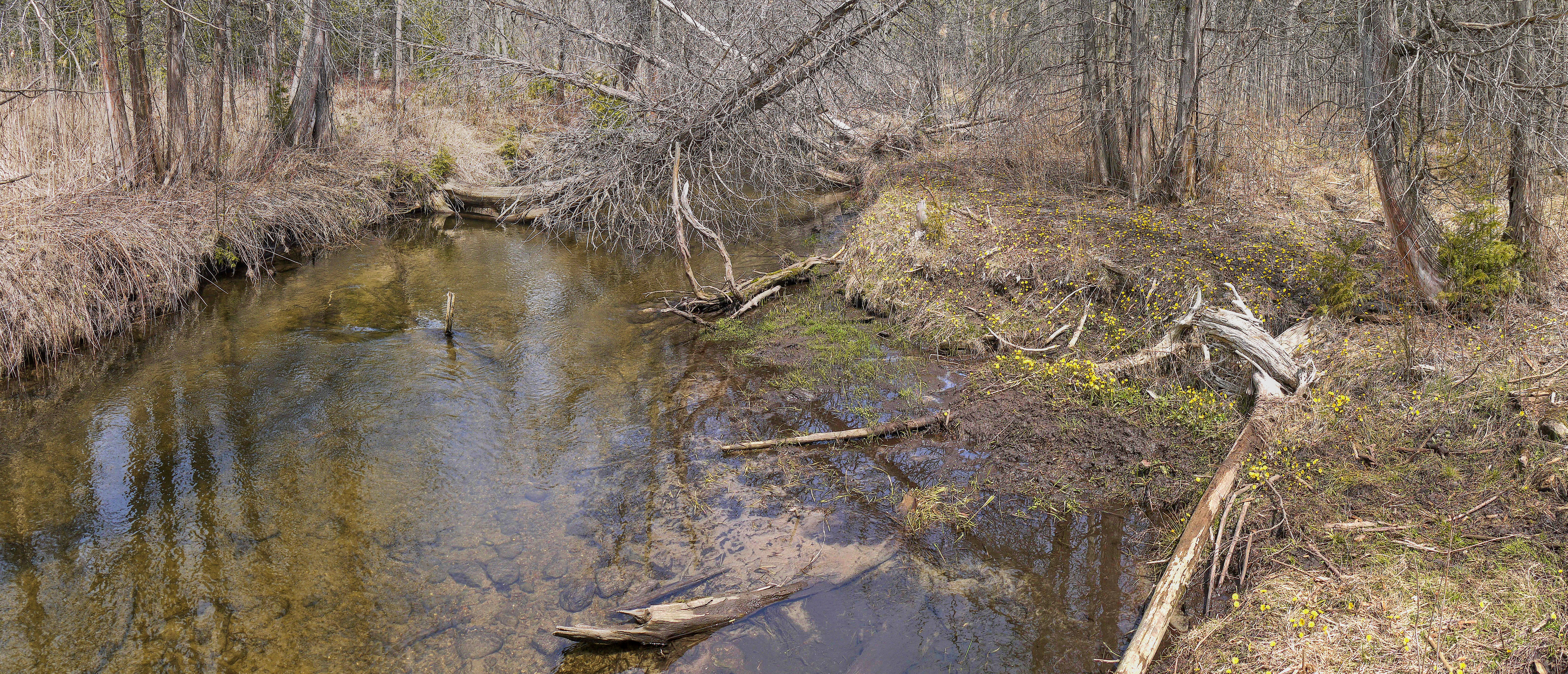
- Headwaters of the West Duffins Creek, Rouge National Urban Park

- Location of the mouth of the Duffins Creek in southern Ontario

Location
- Country: Canada
- Province: Ontario
- Area: Greater Toronto Area
- Region: Regional Municipality of Durham
- Municipalities: Stouffville; Markham; Uxbridge; Pickering; Ajax

Physical characteristics
- Source: Confluence of several branches of Duffins Creek and tributaries
  - location: Uxbridge (Goodwood and Glen Major); Stouffville (Bloomington and Lincolnville)
- Mouth: Duffins Marsh at Lake Ontario
  - location: Ajax
  - coordinates: 43°49′00″N 79°02′05″W
- Basin size: 287 km^{2} (111 sq mi)
- Discharge
  - average: 1.38 m^{3}/s (49 cu ft/s)
  - minimum: 0.51 m^{3}/s (18 cu ft/s)
  - maximum: 3.67 m^{3}/s (130 cu ft/s)

Basin features
- River system: Great Lakes Basin

Duffins Creek is a waterway in the eastern end of the Greater Toronto Area in Ontario, Canada. The watershed of the Duffins Creek is part of the Durham Region (Uxbridge, Pickering and Ajax) and the York Region (Markham and Whitchurch-Stouffville).

== Etymology and names ==
Augustus Jones, who surveyed the area for the Government of Upper Canada in 1791, states that the native (Mississauga Anishinaabek) name for the stream was Sin-qua-trik-de-que-onk, meaning "pine wood on side". The Ojibwe Mississauga name of the creek in modern orthography is Zhingwaatigotigweyaa-ziibi.

The French missionaries from Ganatsekwyagon, who reached the stream in 1670, called it Riviere au Saumon, meaning the "Salmon River", because of a large number of salmon fish that spawned there.

Jones named the stream after Mike Duffin, the first person of European descent to settle in the area. The current name of the stream first appears as "Duffin" on Jones' map in 1791; subsequent records mention the variants "Duffin's" and "Duffins".

== History ==
The Duffins Creek watershed includes 192 archaeological sites tracked using the Borden System. These sites represent both indigenous peoples and early European settlers.

Number of archaeological sites in the Duffins Creek Watershed
Stream	Paleo-Indian	Archaic	Woodland	Undermined Aboriginal	Mississauga	Multi-component	Euro-Canadian	Undetermined	Total
Stouffville Creek		1	1					1	3
Reesor Creek		2	2					6	10
West Duffins	1	13	5	6				36	61
Wixon Creek			1					1	2
Mitchell Creek		3	1		1			8	13
East Duffins	2	2	5	25		2	1	5	42
Major Creek		3	3	1				11	18
Whitevale Creek									0
Ganatsekiagon Creek		2	7	3			1	4	17
Urfé Creek	2		2					2	6
Brougham Creek		3	2					5	10
Millers Creek		1	1	4			4		10
Total	5	30	30	39	1	2	6	79	192

Projectile points of "Hi-Lo" style have been discovered at four Late Paleo-Indian (10000-7000 BCE) sites in the Duffins Creek watershed. Around Lake Ontario, the indigenous peoples have been commonly associated with the lake shore, which fluctuated because of the melting glaciers. At the end of the Last Glacial Period, the Duffins Creek met Lake Ontario at a point located 10-20 m below the present surface level. So, any evidence of indigenous activity at the mouth of the Duffins Creek would be under water now.

Scattered remains of chert (flint) tools and flakes have been discovered at several inland sites dated to the Archaic period (7000 BCE-1000 BCE). Detailed excavations have not been carried out at these sites, so little information is available about the pre-historic residents of the area.

Several sites dated to the early and middle Woodland period (1000 BCE-700 CE) exist along the Duffins Creek, but not much research has been done on them. The sites from the Late Woodland period (700-1651 CE) indicate the existence of permanent villages that were occupied for 5-30 years. Some of the Iroquoian villages were 3-10 acres in size, and featured longhouses and palisades. The largest site from this period in the Duffins Creek watershed is the Draper Site, which was excavated during the 1970s for the proposed Pickering Airport.

In the mid-17th century, the Iroquois people displaced the Petun and the Wendat (Huron) from what is now southern Ontario. The Iroquois Seneca people established river-side villages in nearby areas, such as Ganatsekwyagon on Rouge and Teiaiagon on Humber. However, the Duffins Creek was not as attractive for building a settlement, because a sand bar at its mouth prevented boats from entering it. Moreover, it was navigable for canoes only for 6 km upstream. When the Europeans arrived in present-day Ajax, at least one Ojibwe family resided in area, as attested by Arthur Field. This family lived at the east edge of the Duffins Creek marshes until the mid-19th century.

Unlike the Rouge River watershed, where a well-established trail ran along the stream, the Duffins Creek watershed remained largely ignored by the early European visitors in the area. In 1670, French missionaries from Ganatsekwyagon reached the Duffins Creek, but did not settle there.

In the 1770s, Mike Duffin, an Irish fur trader, became the first person of European descent to settle in the Duffins Creek area. He built a cabin on the east side of the Creek, north of a trail that later became the Kingston Road. At the beginning of the 19th century, the Duffins Creek was navigable as far up as Kingston Road. Later, the water flow decreased as a result of construction of mill dams and clearing of forests for farming. The dams also cut off the salmon from their spawning grounds. Pickering Village, a settlement initially known as "Duffins Creek", developed along the stream, in what is now Ajax. The first mill in the new settlement was established in 1810 by Timothy Rogers on the banks of Duffins Creek. At the time of Rogers's arrival, thousands of salmon from Lake Ontario came to the Duffins Creek. By the time of his death in 1834, the salmon had practically disappeared from the stream.

The growth of Pickering Township (which included Pickering Village) was slow compared to the other parts of Greater Toronto Area, because much of the land was held by absentee landlords (such as the Smith family), or held as Crown and Clergy reserves. Apart from Pickering Village, several other communities developed in the Duffins Creek watershed in the early 19th century:

- Magnolia (California Corners), in present-day Markham, centred on the intersection of 10th Concession Line (now Reesor Road) and 18th Avenue (now Elgin Mills Road East)
- Stouffersville (later Stouffville), in present-day Whitchurch-Stoufville, located at the intersection of Stoufville Creek and the 9th Concession
- Bloomington, in present-day Whitchurch-Stoufville, north of Stouffville
- Glasgow, Goodwood and Glen Major; in present-day south-west Uxbridge
- Whitevale, Brougham, Green River, Claremont, Altona, Greenwood, and Balsam; in present-day Pickering

During 1825-1900, population of the Duffins Creek watershed increased substantially because of growth in farming and other businesses. After 1850s, several smaller communities declined as people migrated to larger centres located along the Grand Trunk Railway. Pickering Village and Stoufville, where several mills had earlier been established and which were now accessible by railway, emerged as the major population centres of the area. The community around the DIL munitions plant evolved into the town of Ajax in the mid-20th century. The northern part of the Duffins Creek watershed did not develop as rapidly as other watersheds in the Greater Toronto area, because the Government of Canada marked a large portion of land for the proposed Pickering Airport.

== Course ==
The headwaters of the Duffins Creek are located in the Oak Ridges Moraine area, within the boundaries of Uxbridge, Pickering, Markham, and Whitchurch-Stouffville. The mouth of the stream is located in Ajax.

The Duffins Creek drains an area of 283 sq. km., much of which is owned by the government. The federal government owns around 75 sq. km., the provincial government of Ontario owns around 28 sq. km., and the Toronto and Region Conservation Authority (TRCA) owns around 23 sq. km.

=== List of tributaries ===
Although Duffins Creek is a single waterway entering Lake Ontario at Duffins Marsh in Ajax, there are 12 other waterways that branches off Duffins towards the Oak Ridges Moraine.

The main tributaries of Duffins Creek include:

- West Duffins Creek - branch of main creek near Pickering Village and runs northwest towards Stouffville
  - Stouffville Creek - named for the town for which the creek runs course off Duffins
  - Reesor Creek - named for Reesor family that resides in the area in north Pickering and Markham
  - Wixon Creek
  - Major Creek
  - Whitevale Creek
- East Duffins Creek
  - Mitchell Creek
  - Brougham Creek
  - Spring Creek
- East Duffins Creek
- Urfé Creek
- Ganatsekagon Creek
- Millers Creek

== See also ==
- Pickering Village, Ontario - a neighbourhood in Ajax, Ontario, which at one point, was called Duffins Creek
- Seaton, Ontario - a planned community in Pickering, Ontario
