= Pickering Village =

Pickering Village Canton, Duffins Creek
- Neighbourhood
- Pickering Village (right) is now a neighbourhood in the town of Ajax. Some of the early settlement's territory is now part of the Village East neighbourhood (left) in the city of Pickering. Interactive map of Pickering Village neighbourhood in Ajax
- Location in southern Ontario
- Coordinates: 43°51′8″N 79°3′4″W
- Country: Canada
- Province: Ontario
- Regional municipality: Durham
- Town: Ajax
- Settled: c. 1800
- Incorporated (municipal village): 1953

Population (2011)
  - Total: 3,520
- Time zone: UTC-5 (EST)
  - Summer (DST): UTC-4 (EDT)
- Forward sortation area: L1T, L1S
- Area codes: 905 and 289
- NTS Map: 030M14
- GNBC Code: FEQTG

Pickering Village is a former municipality and now a neighbourhood in the town of Ajax, within the Durham Region of Ontario, Canada. The Pickering Village derives its name from the former Pickering Township, which included the present-day town of Ajax and the city of Pickering. A small portion of the original settlement is now part of the Village East neighbourhood in the city of Pickering.

The Pickering Village emerged as a settlement at the intersection of Duffins Creek and Kingston Road towards the end of the 18th century. In 1807, Quakers led by Timothy Rogers established a major presence in the area, and built saw and grist mills. The area gradually developed into the main commercial and residential centre of the Pickering Township. It was incorporated as the Municipality of the Village of Pickering in 1953, around same time as the neighbouring DIL community in Ajax. In 1974, most of the Pickering Village, the Pickering Beach, and other areas neighbouring the DIL settlement merged with the town of Ajax, while the city of Pickering remains a separate entity.

== Etymology and names ==
Since its establishment, the settlement that developed around the intersection of Duffins Creek and Kingston Road was part of the Pickering Township, which was named after Pickering, North Yorkshire. The settlement was the major population centre of the Township, and the local post office, established in 1829, was known as the "Pickering Post Office". However, the settlement itself was known by various names at different times.

In its early years, the settlement was called "Duffins Creek", or simply, "the Creek". In the 1850s, it was known as "Canton", as attested by an 1855 map in the possession of William Murkar, the publisher of The Pickering News. Murkar, writing on Pickering's 150th anniversary in the 29 June 1961 edition of the newspaper, also cites an elderly lady who confirmed that the area was known as Canton when she worked for the family that owned the Spink's Mill (now the site of Moodie's Motel at the intersection of Kingston Road and Notion Road).

By the time the village was formally designated as a police village under the County of Ontario, in 1900, it was firmly known as Pickering. When it achieved municipal status in 1953, it was incorporated as the "Municipality of the Village of Pickering". Since its amalgamation into the town of Ajax in 1974, it has been called the "Pickering Village" to distinguish it from the neighbouring city of Pickering.

== History ==
=== Early settlers ===
The Iroquois Seneca people had established river-side villages such as Ganatsekwyagon on Rouge and Teiaiagon on Humber in what is now the Greater Toronto Area. However, the Duffins Creek was not as attractive for building a settlement, because of low navigability and the existence of a sand bar at its mouth which prevented boats from entering it. At least one Ojibwe family resided in the area, as attested by Arthur Field. This family lived at the east edge of the Duffins Creek marshes until the mid-19th century. In 1760, French missionaries from Ganatsekwyagon reached the Duffins Creek, but did not create any settlement there.

Mike Duffin (died c. 1791), a fur trader of Irish descent, was the earliest European to settle in the area that later came to be known as Pickering Village. A bachelor, he arrived in the area in the 1770s. Past Years in Pickering, a 1911 book by William R. Wood, describes him as a "King's County Irishman" who had come from "the Green Isle". Duffins cleared a few acres of forest land, but survived mainly by fishing, hunting (fowl and deer), and eating tubers. He trapped animals for fur, and traded with the natives. A Methodist minister, who traveled across Ontario, used to meet Duffin when passing through the area, and found his dead body one day. Wood speculated that he may have been murdered by the natives. Another theory is that he was murdered by one of the travelers for whom he provided lodging. Duffins cabin was located on the east side of the Creek, north of Kingston Road. Augustus Jones, who surveyed the area for the Government of Upper Canada in 1791, named the Duffins Creek after him.

The municipality that contained the area was known as Edinburgh Township until 1792, when it was renamed to Pickering Township. Major John Smith of 5th Regiment of Foot, who had served the commanding officer at Detroit, became the first person to receive a land patent in the region. He was an absentee landlord, and his grant of 5,000 acres of land included a part of what later became the Pickering Village. The grant was inherited by his son David W. Smith, who received an additional 1,200 acres of land.

In 1799, the Government of Upper Canada converted the major trail in the area into the Kingston Road, which greatly contributed to increased settlement in the area.

=== Quaker settlement ===
In this first decade of the 19th century, a small number of Quakers from the United States migrated to the Pickering Township. The Quakers, who were anti-war and advocated pacifism as part of their religious belief, had migrated to other parts of Upper Canada during and after following the American War of Independence. In 1807, Quaker leader Timothy Rogers bought 800 acres of land in the Duffins Creek area, at 10 shillings per acre. He arrived in Pickering with his wife, most of his 15 children, and 20 other Quaker families. They settled around what is now the intersection of Kingston Road and Mill Street, and cleared forest for farming.

By 1809, the population of Pickering Township was 180 people, most of whom lived along the Duffins Creek. The writings of Timothy Rogers' son Wing suggest that the area was remained densely forested at the time, home to "thousands of wolves, bears, deer, foxes, wildcats, or lynx, raccoons, and other small animals too numerous to mention." Wing states that the settlers were most afraid of packs of wolves, followed by the bears. There had been frequent encounters between these wild animals and the settlers, resulting in deaths of humans and domestic animals. An 1805 news report in York Gazette describes how a woman called Mrs. Munger shot dead a bear that attacked her neighbour.

By 1820, Quakers from the British Isles had started arriving in the area, encouraged by Rogers. The Quakers built several meeting houses, a small school, and the Pickering College in the Pickering Village. In 1842, there were 245 Quakers in Pickering Township, whose total population was 3,450.

=== Industry and businesses ===
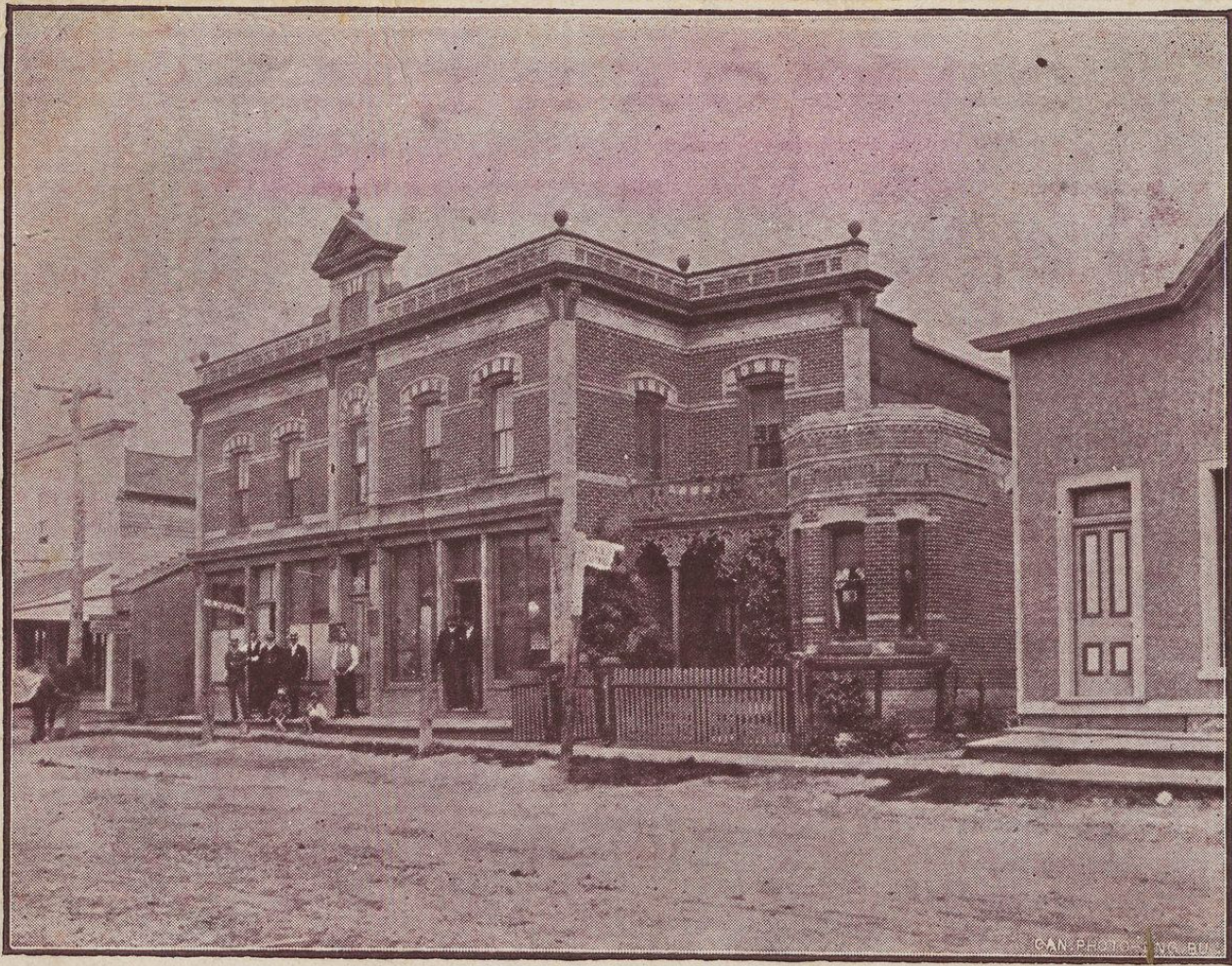
Dale Block, the Village's largest commercial building, in 1908

Timothy Rogers built the first mill in the area, in 1810. His saw and grist mills were located around 5 km north of Lake Ontario. The dams constructed for the mills cut off the salmon off from their spawning grounds, and by the time of Rogers death, the salmon had practically disappeared from the Duffins Creek.

In 1820, Alexander Wood of Toronto build the Elmdale grist mill near the intersection of what is now Church Street and Highway 401; the site was later occupied a Latter-day Saint chapel. The mill was rebuilt and changed owners several times, before being destroyed by fire in 1956. By 1825, there were two other sawmills in the township, one was on the Rouge below the old bridge, and one, and the other one probably higher up on the Duffins Creek. The lumber from these mills supported the shipbuilding industry at the mouth of the Rouge river. In 1837, a man surnamed Elliot, built a grist mill; it was later sold to Peter Head, and was known as Head's Mill. It gradually fell into disrepair, and was ultimately destroyed by fire.

Noadiah Woodruff of Pennsylvania, another Quaker, settled in Duffins Creek around the same time as Timothy Rogers. In 1808, he built a tavern to the west of the village, on Lot 17 Concession 2 (almost immediately west of Moodie's Motel). The site later housed the Riverside Farms. Woodruff married Charity Powell, whose family owned a farm in the Pickering Beach area. Woodruff's sister Melinda married clock-maker Jordan Post, and their family acquired extensive lands in and around Toronto. In 1822, the Post family built the Post Inn on the south side of Kingston Road, around 3 km east of the Pickering village. It served as a home for the family, and also operated as a stage station, providing service for stagecoach driver, passengers, and horses. It shut down after the Grand Trunk Railway reached Pickering in 1856, rendering its services obsolete.

Samuel Munger built another tavern on Lot 16, across the Creek, on the east side of Brock Road, in Concession 3.

Hugh Brown's dry goods store was one of the first general stores in the Pickering Village. In 1857, Brereton Bunting, a migrant from England, bought the store and renamed it Old No. 1 store. The store was very successful, and sold a variety of goods including groceries, clothing, footwear, glassware, light fixtures, hardware, and medicine. His son Richard A. Bunting renamed the store to R. A. Bunting in the late 1880s. Bereton also provided other services, including issuance of marriage licenses.

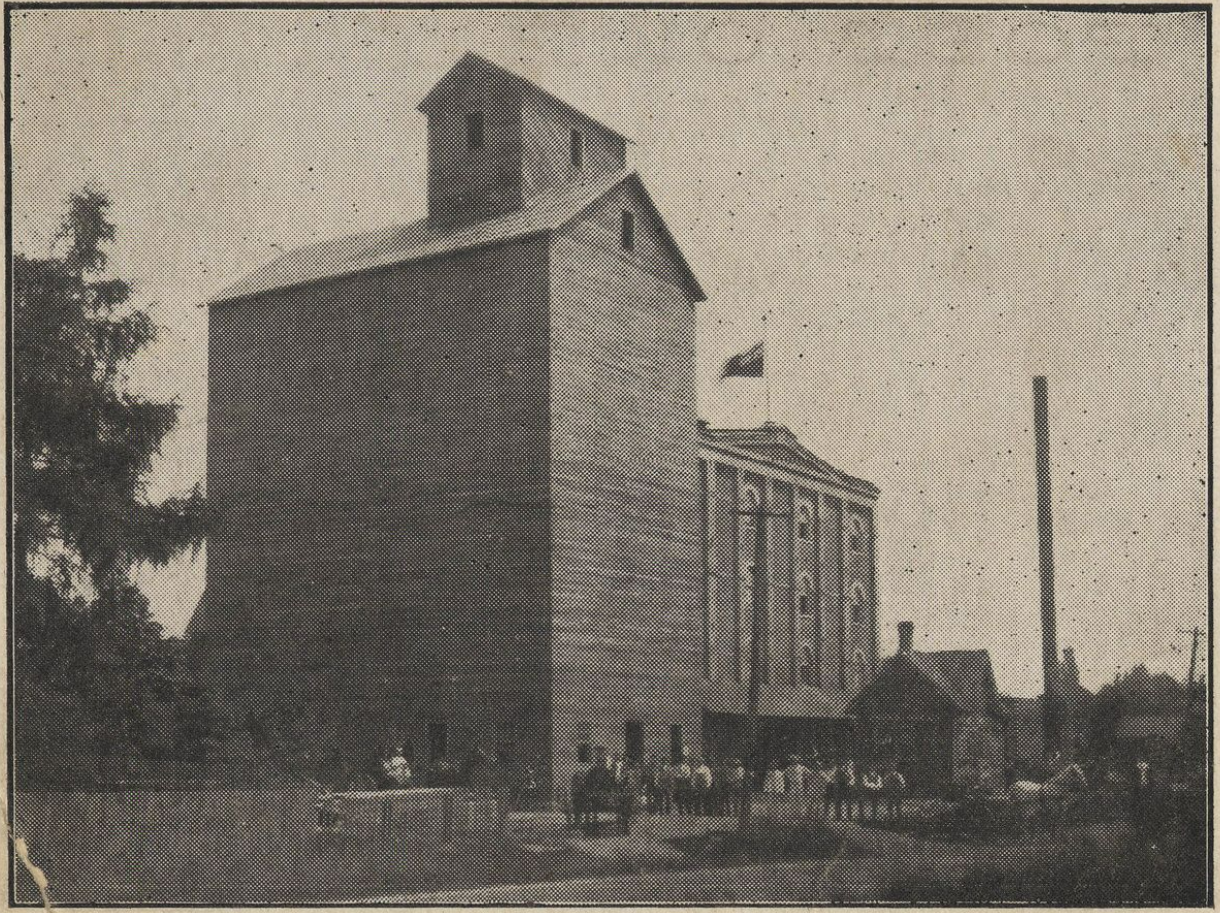
Spink's Mill in 1906

In 1875, John L. Spink established Pickering's largest and most successful grist mill. The mill was located adjacent to the site of Head's Mill. Later, the location was occupied by Moodie's Motel/ Motor Inn, at the intersection of Kingston Road and Notion Road. The mill building was a five-storey (70 feet) high stone structure. The mill infrastructure was later expanded to included dams, a mile-long canal, a storehouse, and a Grand Trunk Railroad switch line. The mill changed owner multiple times, before being destroyed by a fire in 1934.

In 1883, the local farmers and other residents established the Pickering Cheese Factory as a joint stock company. Also known as the Pickering Butter and Cheese Company, the factory was located at the south-east corner of Kingston Road and Ritchie Road (then called Westney Road). The factory was not very profitable, and the stockholders criticized the board of directors for paying the dairy farmers over the market rate for milk. The factory ultimately failed because there were not enough farmers to supply the milk. In 1886, the factory was sold by auction. Attempts to reopen the factory in 1889 failed because of insufficient milk supply. The property of the factory was later turned into a subdivision.

=== Transport ===
The War of 1812 increased military traffic on the Kingston Road, contributing to the development of the Duffins Creek settlement. The soldiers, who used the road more frequently, contributed to its maintenance. The frequency of the stagecoach service increased from twice per week to daily. The increase in the passenger traffic benefited the local businesses, particularly the inn keepers.

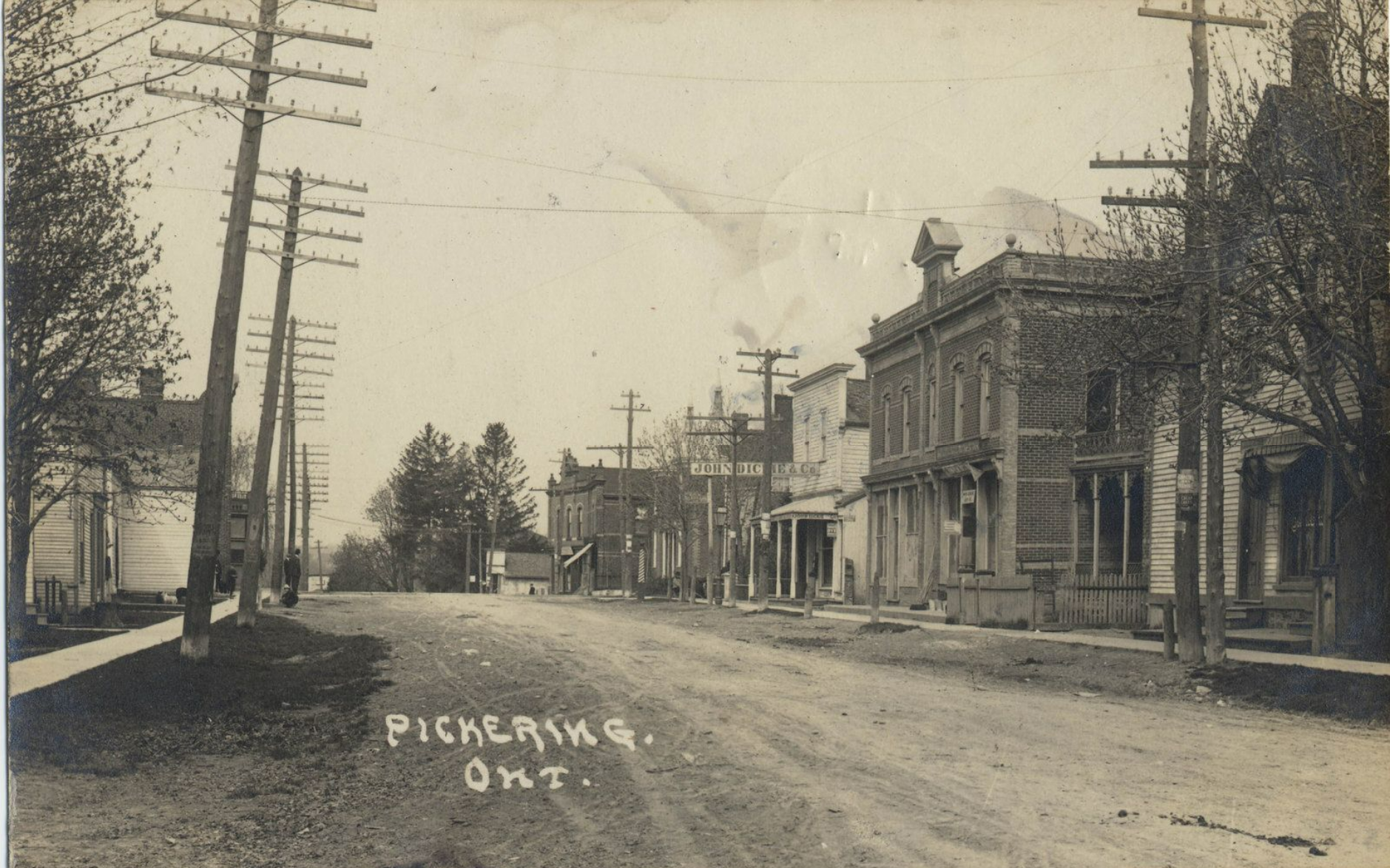
A street in 1910

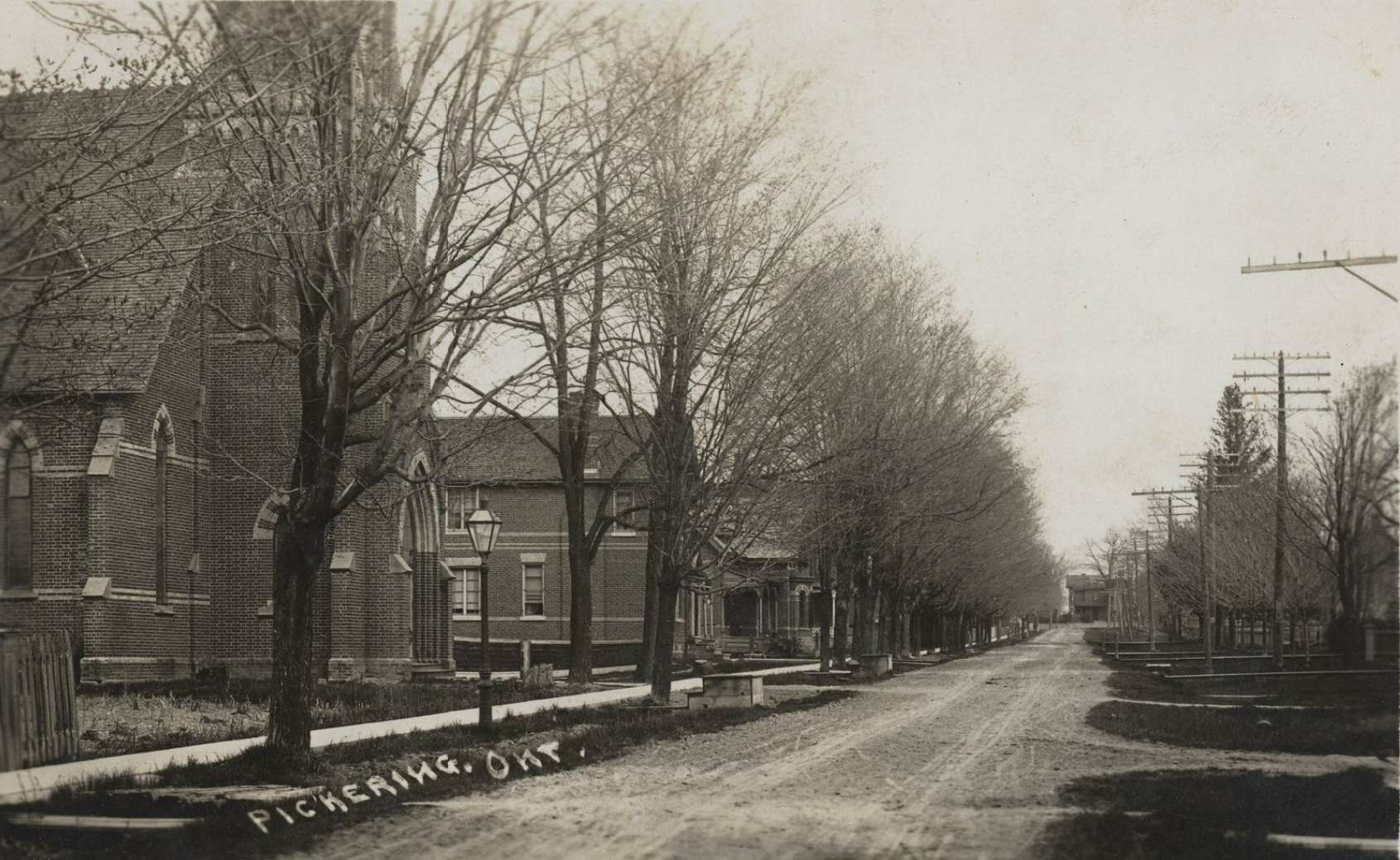
A street in 1912

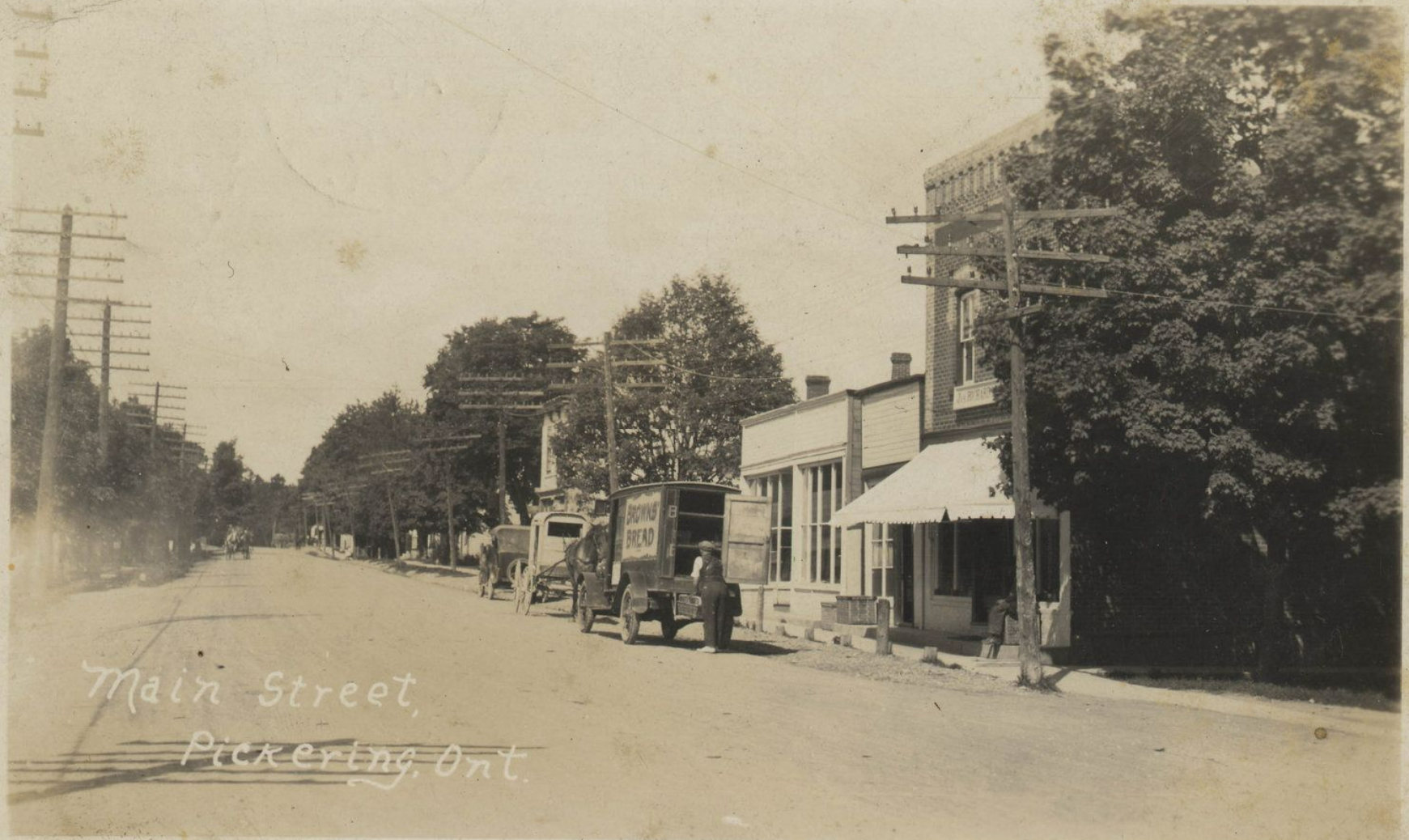
Main Street in 1921

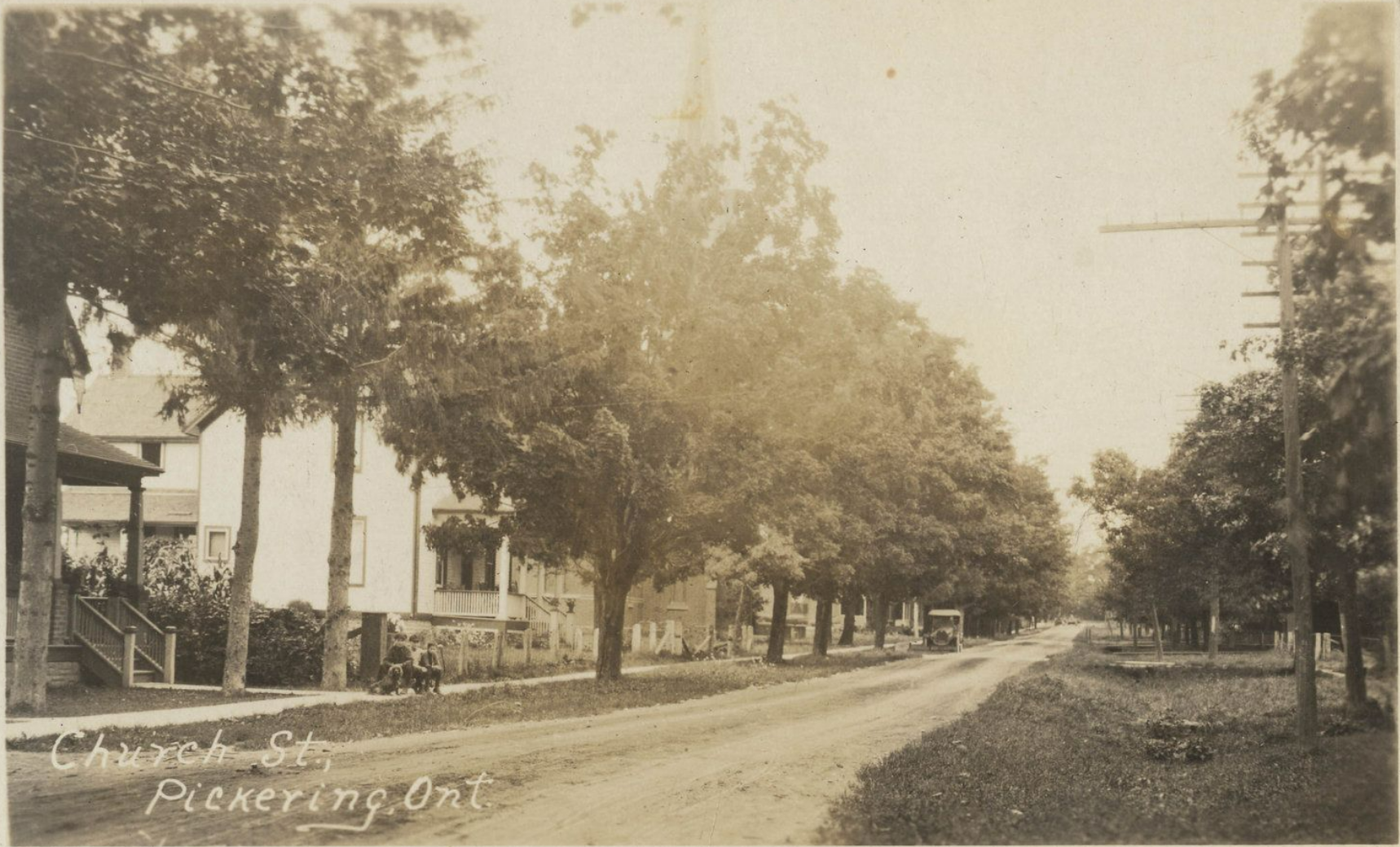
Church Street in 1927

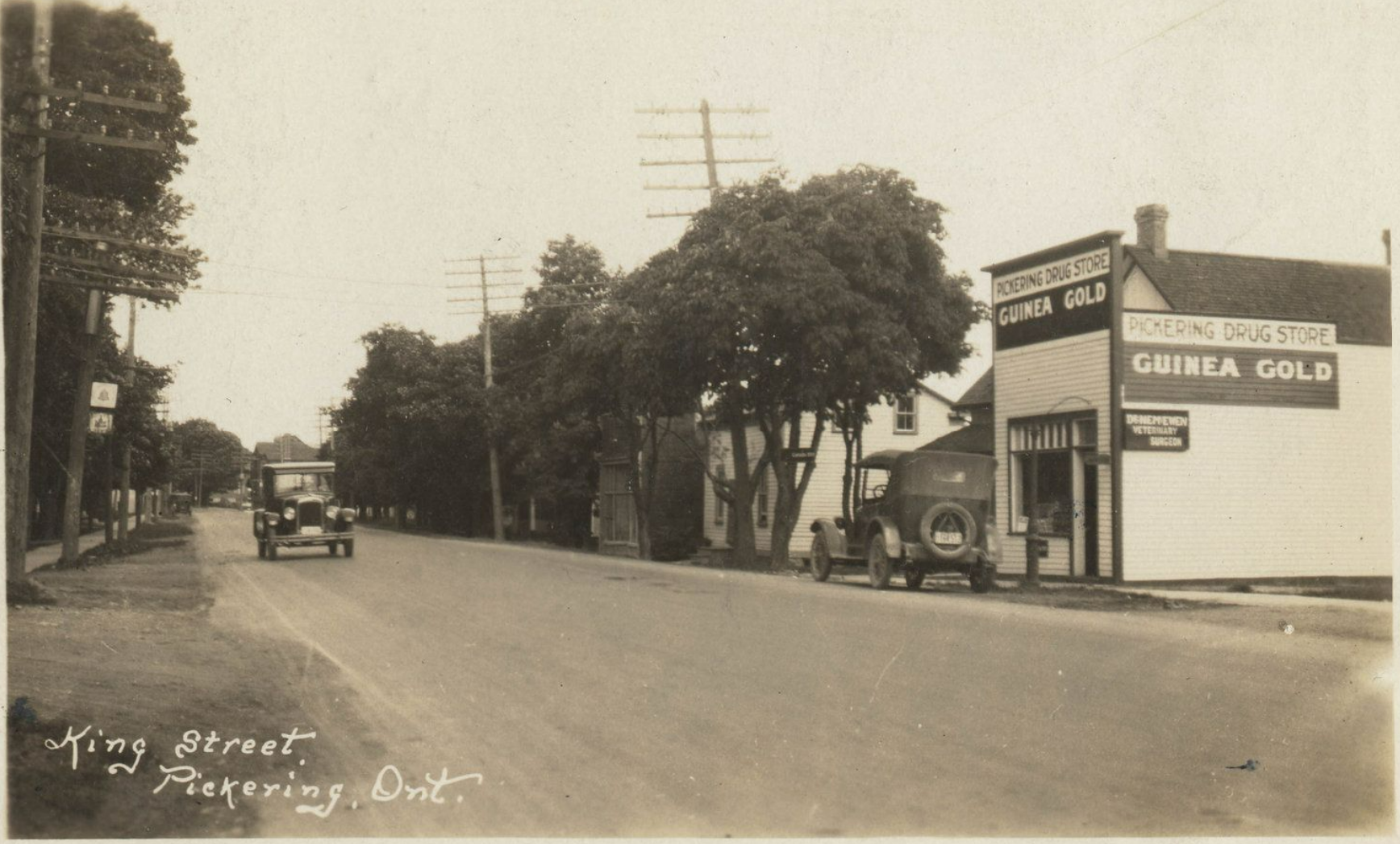
King Street in 1932

The stagecoach service became largely obsolete with the arrival of the Grand Trunk Railway in 1856. However, the demand for local transportation increased because of the considerable distance between the core Pickering Village and the Pickering Railway Station. William Peak (presumably a descendant of an earlier settler of same name) and others provided livery service, carrying mail and passengers between the two points.

In 1891, an iron bridge was constructed across the Duffins Creek on Kingston Road. In 1920, the Department of Highways replaced the iron bridge with a concrete bridge.

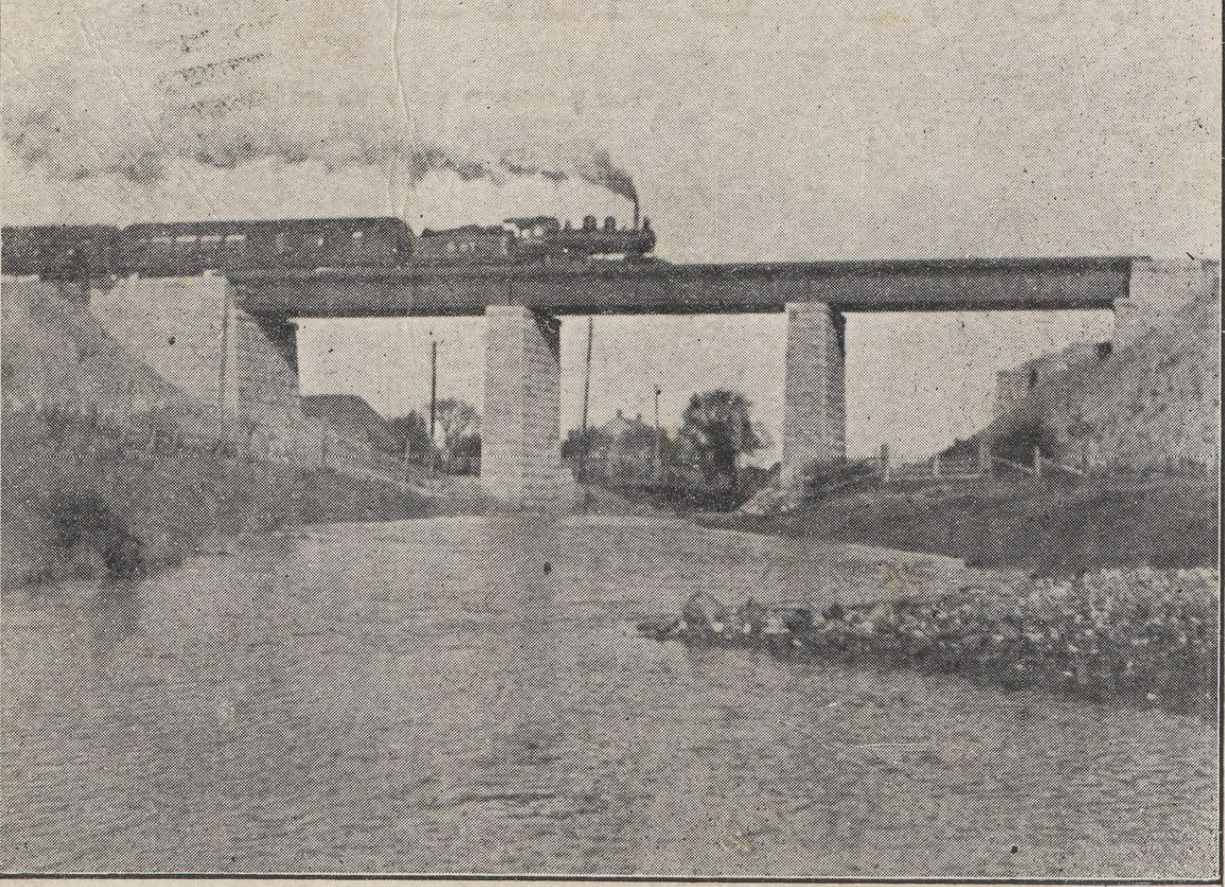
Grand Trunk Railway bridge over Duffins Creek, 1908

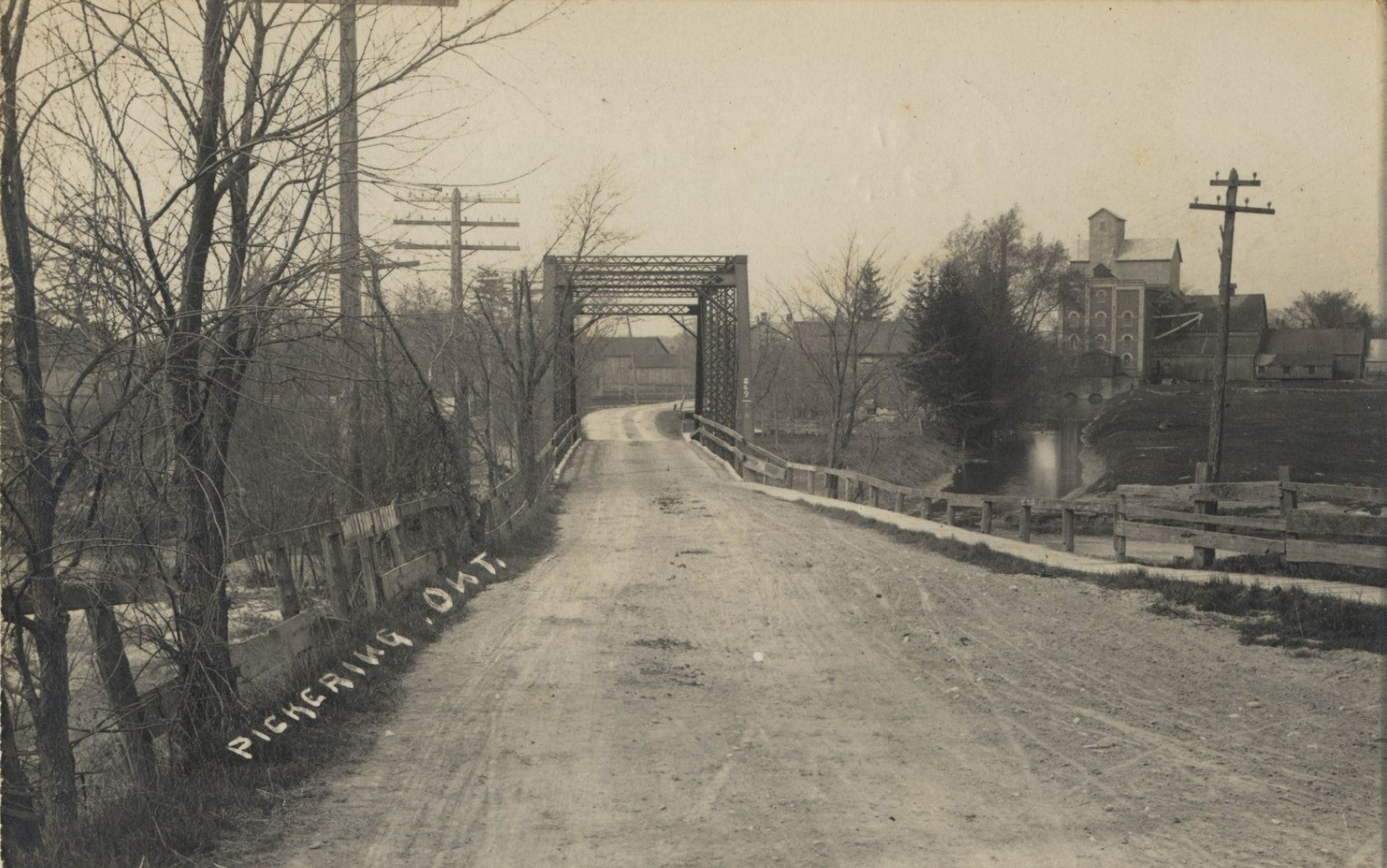
Iron Bridge over Duffins Creek, 1912

During 1910–1912, a proposal to bring The Toronto Eastern electric railway was taken up. Track had been laid from Port Hope in the east to Church Street in the Pickering Village in the west. The right-of-way had been negotiated up to Dunbarton in the west, but there was difficulty in negotiating entry into Toronto. As a result, the entire project was halted, and when the World War I began in 1914, the rails were lifted and shipped to France. The line was completely abandoned during the 1920s.

In 1921, the Kingston Road was paved. Two companies - Collacut Coach Lines of Pickering and Del-Ray Coach Lines of Oshawa - operated bus service along Kingston Road, connecting Pickering Village to Toronto.

=== Telephone ===
In 1844, the telephone network serving communities between Toronto and Whitby reached the Pickering Village. At that time, the Village had only one telephone, which was in a drug store owned by Dr. Byron Field. It was used only for long-distance calling. The service was expanded in the following years, when a Gilliland switchboard was installed in the store. By 1885, five other businesses plus Dr. Field's residence had telephones. In 1886, Dr. Bateman became Dr. Field's partner. When Dr. Field retired in 1887, Dr. Bateman took over his practice, his telephone agency, and his residence. In 1900, a more modern switchboard, of the 117 type, was installed at the drug store. As the telephone agency's responsibilities increased, Dr. Bateman relinquished the job to another person in 1906.

In 1922, the Bell Company transferred its Pickering exchange with 63 subscribers to the Home Company. In 1949, Home Company was amalgamated into the Woodbridge & Vaughan Telephone Company. In 1949, Woodbridge & Vaughan instituted a new exchange service in the southern part of Ajax. In 1953, the North Ajax customers were transferred from the rural Pickering exchange to the Ajax exchange. In 1960, Bell acquired Woodbridge & Vaughan, and all Ajax telephone subscribers became Bell customers.

=== Medical services ===
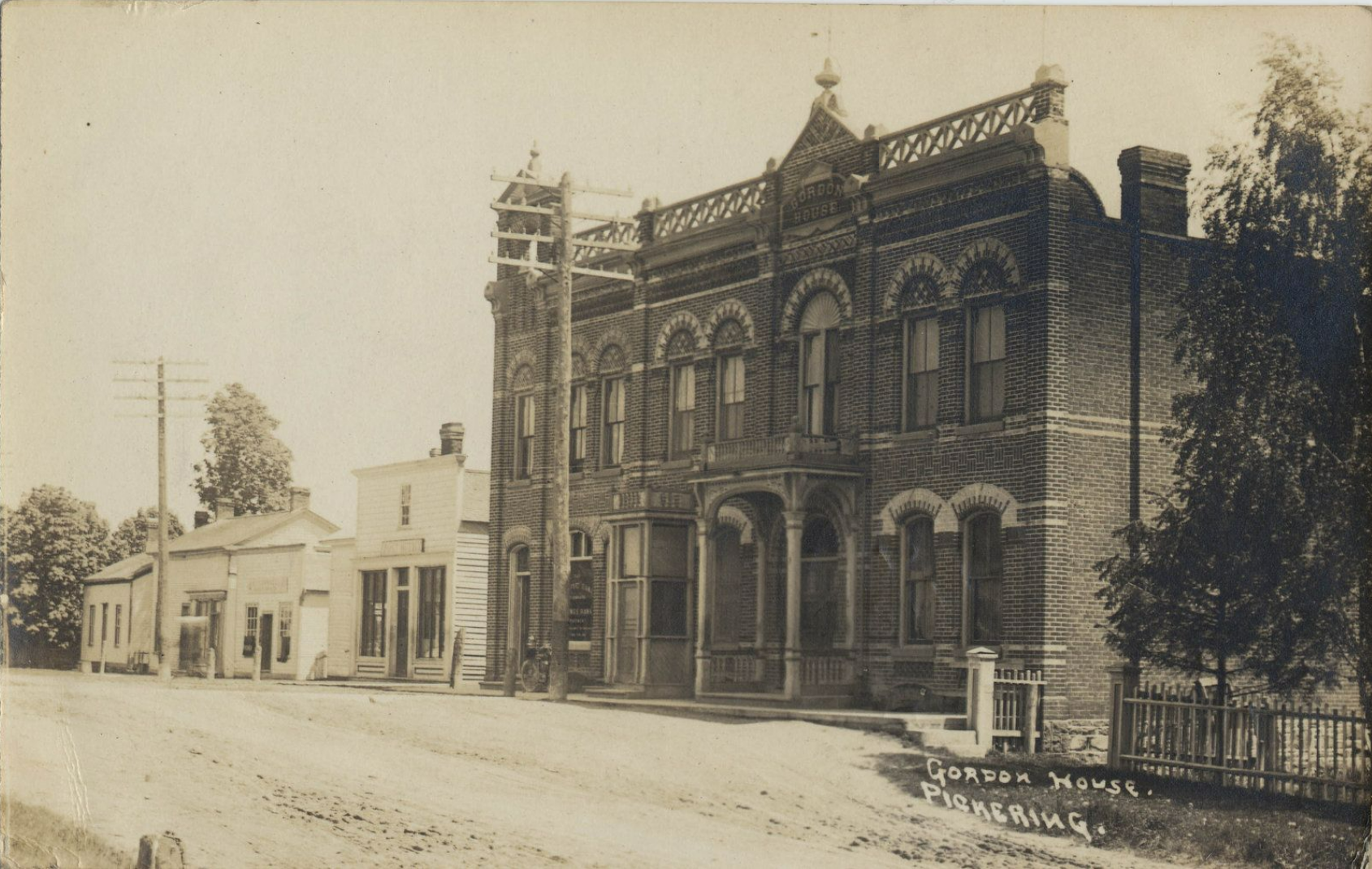
Gordon House (103 Old Kingston Rd) in 1910

The Pickering Village was served by doctors at least since the 1850s, but most of these doctors remained there for a very short time. The first resident doctor of Pickering Village was Dr. Burns, who lived north of the Head's Mill. Dr. Vernon-Cartwright was the first doctor to live in Pickering Village for a long time: he served there from 1917 to 1951, when he retired and moved to Burlington. He was also the local coroner for 25 years. In the 19th century, dentists from other places saw patients in the village on certain days; for example, Dr. F. L. Hemy saw patients at Gordon House every Saturday in 1877. In 1925, Dr. Herbert T. Fallaise became the first resident dentist of the village, seeing patients at his home on Kingston Road. The first veterinarians in the village were George O'Leary and W. H. Hopkins, both of whom graduated from Toronto's Ontario Veterinary College in the 1880s.

=== Media ===
In 1881, W. H. Higgins, who also published the Whitby Chronicle, established The Pickering News. The first issue of the newspaper appeared on 11 November 1881, with James Campbell as its editor. Its ownership changed several times, with John Murkar and Ross Thexton becoming the owners in 1901. After Thexton retired in 1907, Murkar became the sole owner, and the newspaper was owned by his family until its closure in 1965. Murkar, a former school-teacher and principal, rode a horse around Pickering to gather news. He operated the newspaper out of a property on the Old Kingston Road, which is now occupied by The Piano Shop. In 1965, the Inland Publishing Company bought the rights to the Pickering News, and incorporated it into The Ajax News Advertiser. In 1965, the old newspaper press of The Pickering News was given to the Black Creek Pioneer Village in Toronto, where it showcased in the Dalziel Barn. The Murkar family retained the ownership of the building and the other equipment, which they used for commercial printing. In 1970, they rented the building to Bay News.

=== Education ===
Initially, school classes in Pickering Village were held at the home of Francis Leys, a migrant from Scotland, who later became postmaster (Squire Leys' School). Later, two schools were built: a public school at the intersection of Brock Road and Kingston Road (now in city of Pickering), and a Quaker school east of Duffins Creek. The Pickering Township also had several other schools in the rural areas. The earliest school buildings were single-room log houses, heated by a wood burning stove in the centre of the room.

Many of the early teachers lacked qualifications, and lasted for a short time. The young women were generally regarded as the best teachers, but had problems dealing with the oldest male students. The teachers were paid poorly; for example, a teacher's contract from June 1835 offers salary of six shillings per quarter.

In 1867, Pickering's first brick school building was constructed at the southwest corner of Kingston Road and Church Street, in present-day Ajax. Called Pickering Public School S.S. #4 West, it was a one-storey structure. The building was abandoned in 1888, when a larger two-storey brick school was built on Church Street, north of Kingston Road. The new building cost 5,000 dollars to build, and had the capacity to accommodate 200 students. In 1923, two rooms were added to the school building, but high school students still needed to commute to Whitby or Scarborough.

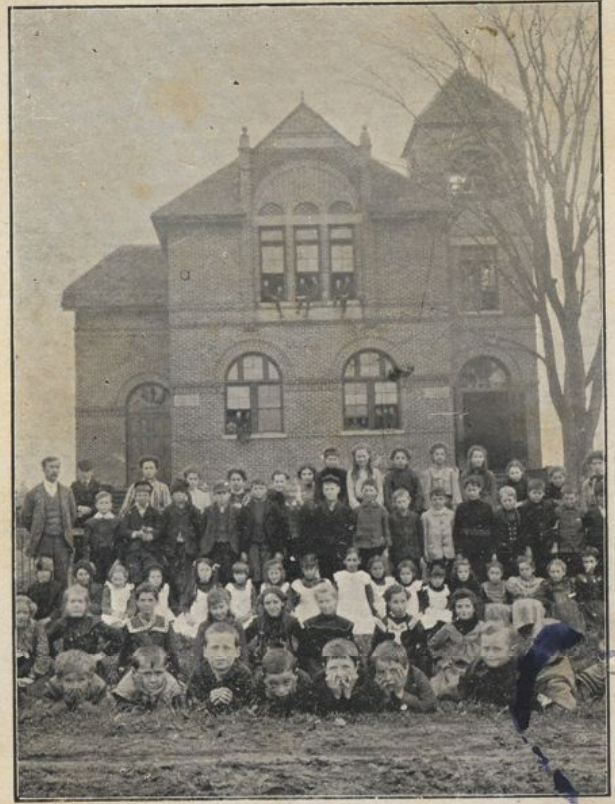
Pickering Public School in 1905

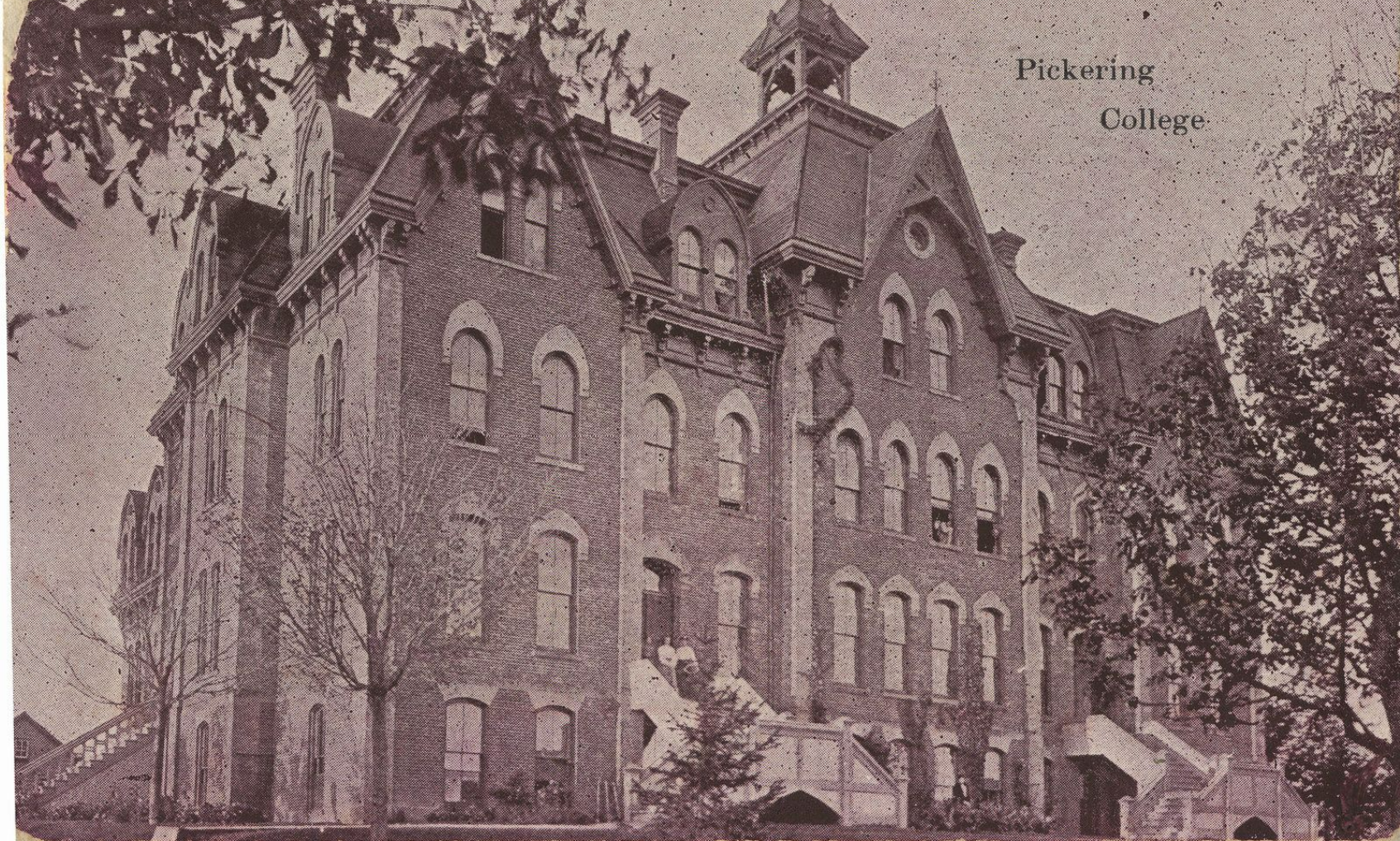
Pickering College in 1907

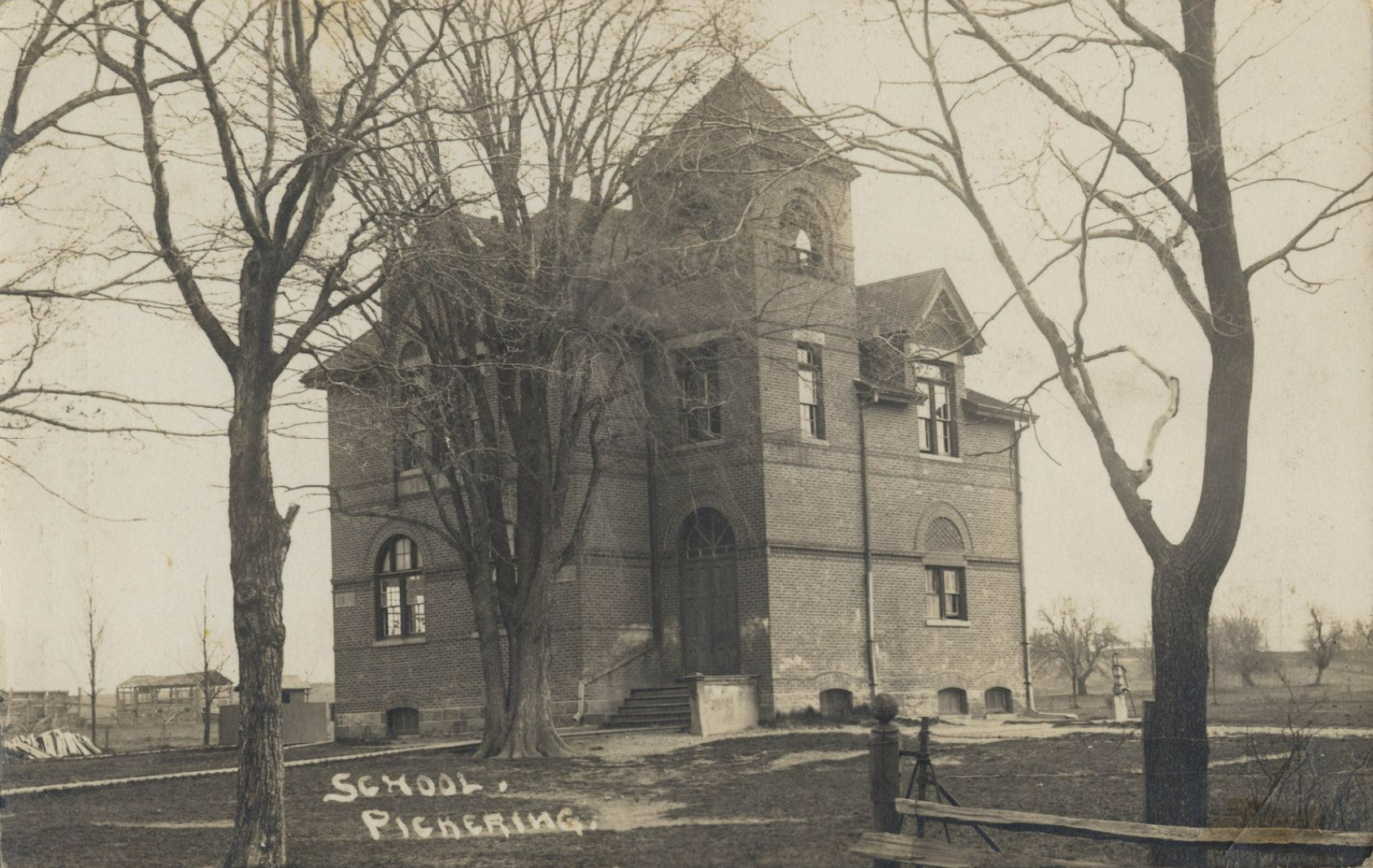
Pickering Public School in 1910

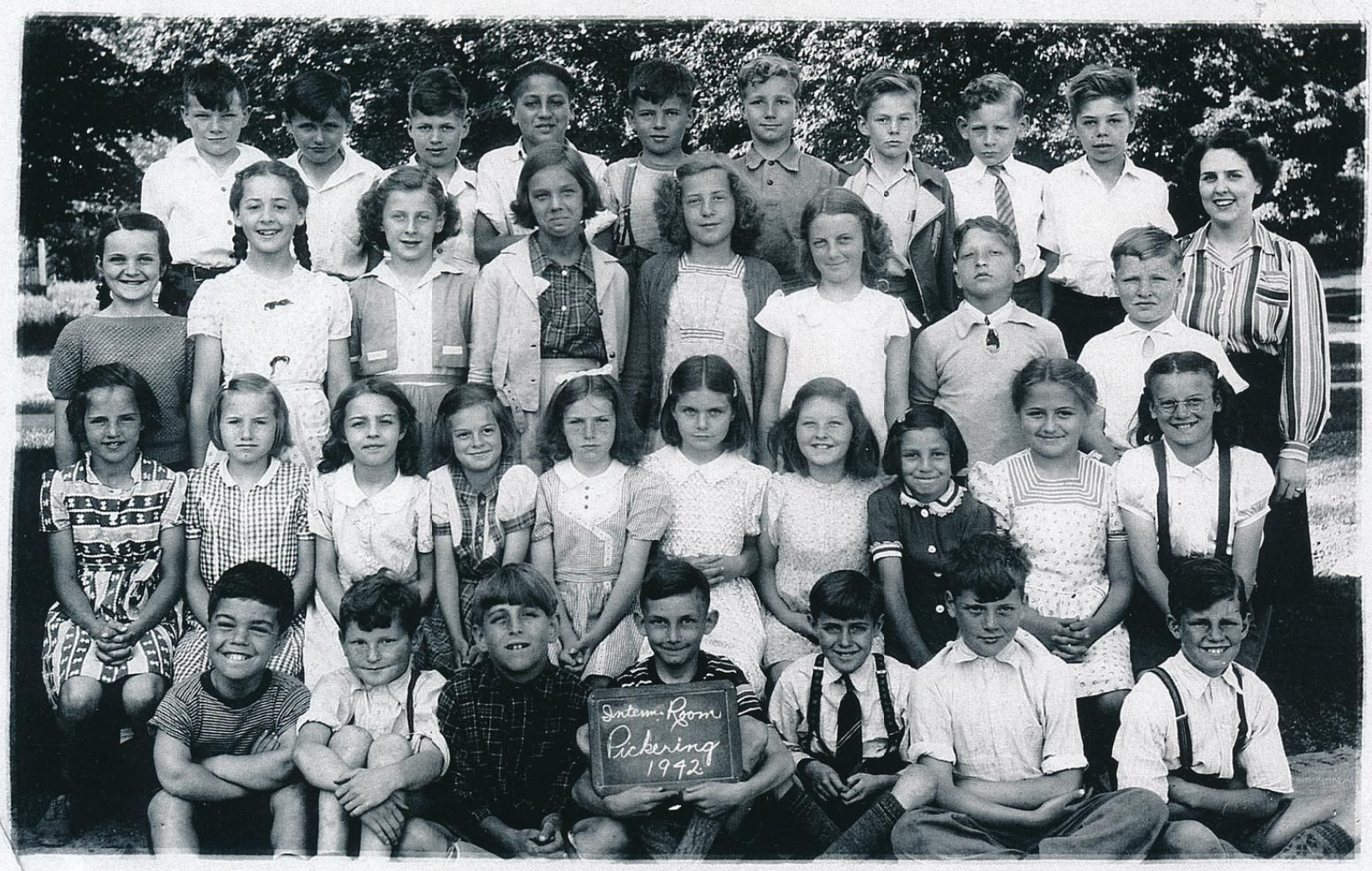
Pickering Public School: grade 3, 4, and 5 students in 1942

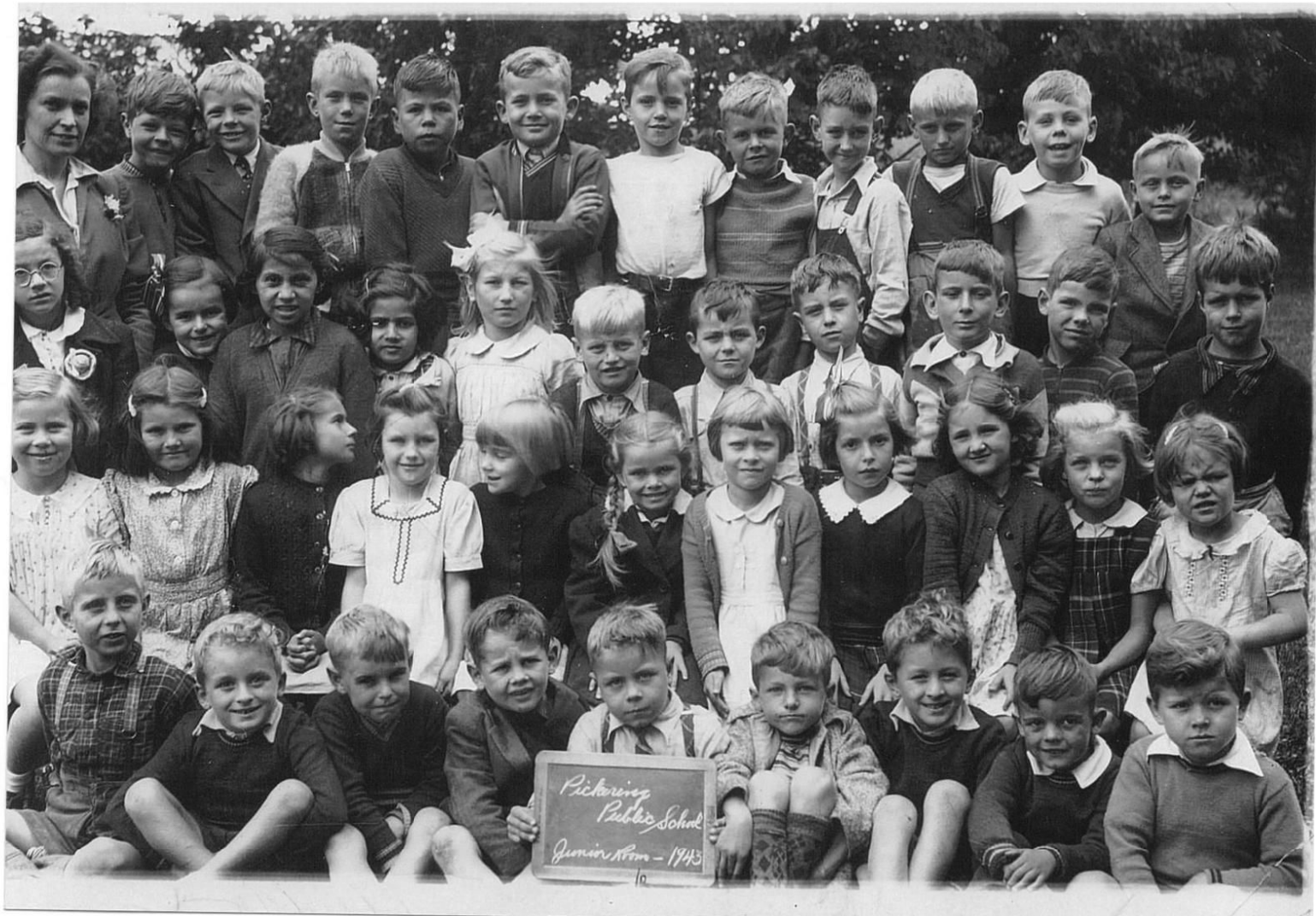
Pickering Public School: grade 1 and 2 students in 1943

In the 1870s, the Quakers decided to relocate their West Lake college to Pickering Village. The construction of the new college building began in 1877, north of Kingston Road, near its intersection with the Mill Street. Called Pickering College, the institution opened for classes in the fall of 1878, and offered residence for students. It offered classes for both boys and girls, in languages, music, art, and university preparation. After a fire destroyed the main building, the Quakers relocated the college to Newmarket, but retained the name "Pickering College". The college property in Pickering Village was sold, and eventually became a subdivision of expensive homes.

=== Religion ===
Anglicans

In 1826, the Anglicans established the first Mission at Duffins Creek. In early days, circuit ministers traveling on horses conduct serves at private homes, schools or public halls. In 1832, Adam Elliott founded the parish of St. George. In 1841, the parishes of Whitby and Pickering were combined, and the St. George's Anglican Church was built. The Grand Trunk Railway supplied the bricks for the building, in exchange for a right-of-way across the south end of the Church property. Improvements were made to the Church in the subsequent years, including the construction of a parish hall in 1959. Edward George Robinson, a pastor at St. George's church, held services at the DIL plant until the establishment of a church there.

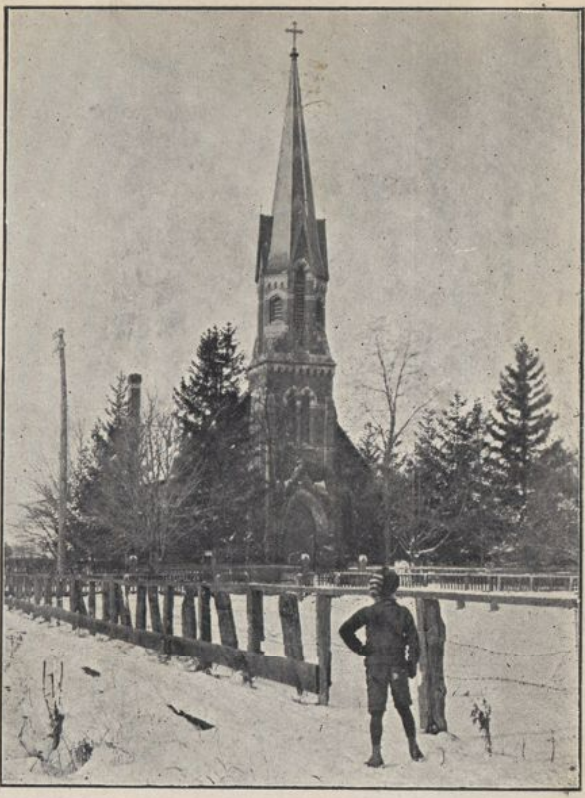
St. Francis de Sales Church, 1909

Roman Catholics

The Roman Catholics in the area attended churches in Toronto until 1842, when a church was built in Oshawa. J. B. Proulx, who was appointed to Oshawa parish in 1848, started the initiative to build a church in the Duffins Creek area. Accordingly, the wooden building of St. Wilfrid's church was erected on the Notion Road (formerly Station Road). The property later became the St. Wilfrid's cemetery.

In 1869, the St. Francis de Sales Church was built on the Church Street. It operated as a mission until 1942, when it became a parish. In 1953, a school was built on the St. Francis de Sales church property.

Presbyterians

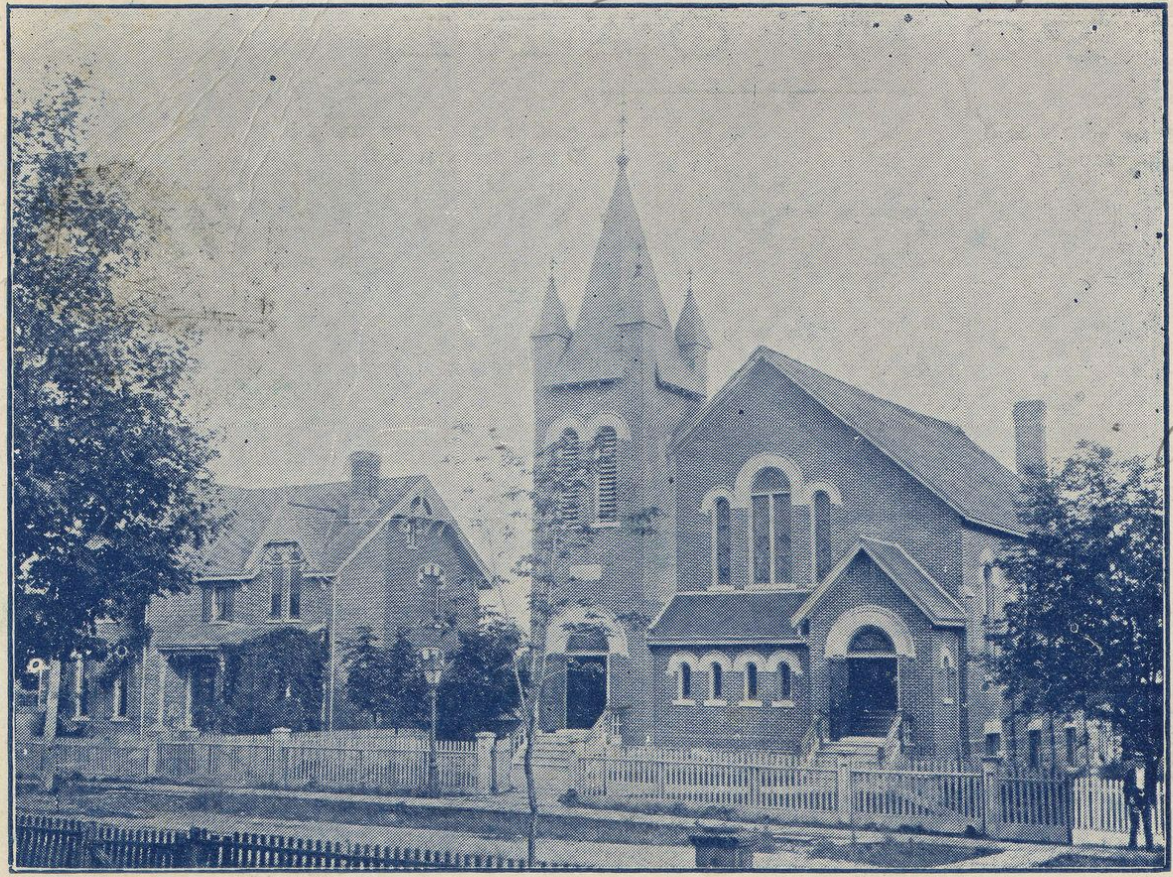
St. Andrew's Presbyterian Church in 1905

In 1835, Robert Hill Thornton, a missionary from Scotland, brought the Presbyterian Church to the area. He lived in what is now called Thornton's Corners in Oshawa, but ministered to his congregation at various places, including Duffins Creek.

In 1841, the Church of Scotland (The Auld Kirk) established St. Andrew's Church in Duffins Creek, with James Lambie in charge. The "Stone Church" was built in 1843.

In 1854, Presbyterian residents of the Pickering Village (then called Canton) and Dunbarton (now in city of Pickering) requested the Toronto Presbytery to unite them as the Canton congregation. In 1857, a brick church was built in the center of the Pickering village for the Canton congregation. The Church remained in use until 1879, when the Canton congregation was incorporated with St. Andrew's. Its building was later used as a town hall before its demolition in 1956. Meanwhile, a new church building for St. Andrew's was erected on Kingston Road.

Methodists

The first Methodist preacher in the Duffins Creek area was James Jackson, a circuit rider. His successor Egerton Ryerson gathered his congregation at Squire Leys' school like other circuit riding preachers. During the 1840s, the Methodists established a regular circuit served by multiple preachers, and in 1844, erected the St. Paul's Methodist Church north of Kingston Road, between Elizabeth Street and the Creek. The property later became a Methodist cemetery. In 1879, the Methodists erected a brick building where the IGA grocery store now stands. In 1930, the Methodists became part of the Pickering United Church.

United Church

In 1930, the St. Andrew's Presbyterian congregation united with the Methodist congregation of St. Paul's to form the Pickering United Church. Dr. J. A. Carmichael revived the Presbyterian Church in Pickering in 1932, used the Quaker meeting house for worship. In 1949, the Presbyterians built a new church on Church Street, north of Kingston Road. In 1970, a Christian Education Building was built. In 1983, a new church building was erected.

In the early 1950s, the tower of the Pickering United Church was dismantled after being stuck by lightning, and was replaced with a metal cottage roof. In 1964, the Christian Education Centre was established. In 1989, the Church was relocated from the small Kingston Street building to a new building on Church Street North. Its name was changed to Pickering Village United Church.

Quakers

The Quakers were influential in Pickering Village since Timothy Rogers and his associates settled there in 1807. Rogers designated land for a large wooden meeting house and a cemetery on the east side of the Mill Street. The cemetery was divided into burial grounds for Quakers and non-Quakers. The non-Quakers' burial ground was nearly full by 1882, and was poorly maintained. The Quakers' burial ground, called the "Friends Cemetery", was well-maintained by the Society of Friends as of 1990s.

In 1830, the local Hicksites split from the larger Quaker body. The Hicksites later built their own Meeting Hall on the north side of Kingston Road, east of Harwood Avenue, opposite the Friends Cemetery.

In 1867, the main body of the Quakers built a large brick meeting hall, on the west side of Mill Street, to accommodate their Annual Meeting. The Annual Meeting was attended by Quakers from Canada, United States, England, and Ireland. In 1908, the meeting hall was heavily damaged by a lightning strike and fire, and rebuilt. The membership of the Quaker movement in the area gradually declined, and in November 1942, The Pickering News carried a public notice of auction of the sale of the Quaker properties in the area. In 1943, the Quakers sold the building to Freemasons, and it became a Masonic Lodge.

Other denominations

In the 1840s, Edmond Shepherd started the Disciples Church with a small group who met in a school building. As the congregation grew over 200 members, a brick church was built on Kingston Road. The congregation membership declined gradually, and the Disciples Church discontinued its services by the end of the century.

The Bible Christian movement met in a small brick church on the north-west corner of Kingston Road and George Jones Avenue. In 1883, they united with the Methodist Church, and their building was taken over by the Hicksite Quakers.

During the World War II, the churches of Pickering Villages served the residents of the DIL Pickering Works community in Ajax. Bernard Kyte of St. Francis opened a mission at the Ajax Recreation Centre; the mission evolved into St. Bernadette's Parish. Pickering United Church and St. George's Anglican Church conducted joint services at the Ajax Recreation Centre under the ministry of the M. R. Jenkinson.

=== Other services ===
On 6 January 1829, a Scottish immigrant Francis Leys opened the first post office in the Duffins Creek area. It was called the "Pickering Post Office", and was located at various places near the intersection of Kingston Road and Church Street at different times.

In 1942, the Pickering Village established its own civil defense unit, and 25 people signed up for a volunteer fire brigade. When a fire broke out, the volunteers were summoned using a town bell (c. 1898) that rang for church services and daily at specified times. The regular use of the bell was discontinued in 1944, and it rang only on special occasions, such as on the Victory in Europe Day in 1945.

In 1941, when the federal government established a water distribution system at DIL Pickering Works in Ajax, the Pickering Village requested a connection to the DIL water plant, for its 136 houses and several small businesses. However, the request was denied, and the Village had to wait another 15 years for running water.

=== Municipal status ===
By 1850, when the Pickering Village achieved a formal village status, it had over 300 residents. It had 4 churches, a brewery, two hotels, a doctor, two water mills, and several merchants. As a commercial center, it attracted visitors from the surrounding rural areas, including Scarborough, Uxbridge, and Whitby.

On 2 June 1900, the Village of Pickering was formally designated as a police village, authorized under bylaw number 580 by the County of Ontario. The first meeting of the Village's trustees was held on 20 June. On 1 March 1953, the village achieved full municipal status, incorporating as the "Municipality of the Village of Pickering". At that time, it had a population of nearly 900.

In the late 1960s, the Government of Ontario proposed the idea of Regional Municipalities, which would replace the County Councils, taking over the municipal and transportation services common to multiple towns and cities. The former Ontario County would be replaced with the Regional Municipality of Durham, which would include lower-tier city or town municipalities. To gain or retain the lower-tier municipal status, an area had to have a population of at least 8,000. Pickering Village (population 2,535) fell considerably short of this threshold, and was to be merged with either the Township of Pickering (population 17,000) or the Town of Ajax (population 12,000). Some of its residents resented the idea of losing their distinct identity with this merger.

After a series of negotiations between the various municipalities and the provincial government, on 1 January 1974, Pickering Village merged with Ajax within the Durham Region. To satisfy the residents of Pickering Village, the town of Ajax enacted strict development guidelines to ensure that the village retained its "distinctive flavour".

== See also ==
- History of Ajax, Ontario
