= Fred Haslam (Quaker) =

Canadian administrator and pacifist

- Born: May 26, 1897; Middleton, Lancashire, England
- Died: October 16, 1979 (aged 82); Toronto, Canada
- Education: self-educated
- Occupations: Administrator, Friends Relief Mission, Vienna, 1920–21; Secretary-treasurer, Rogers Radio Tube Co., 1924–1940; General secretary, Canadian Friends Service Committee, 1931–1956; Research fellow, Woodbrooke Coll., 1967–68; Secretary-treasurer, Canadian Yearly Meeting, 1960–1972

Fred Haslam (26 May 1897 – 16 October 1979) was a Canadian administrator and pacifist.

After emigrating from England to Canada in 1921 he began a lifelong association with Arthur G. Dorland, Albert S. Rogers (son of Edward S. Rogers Sr), and other leading Quakers. He assisted the Rogers Radio Tube Co. in humanitarian pursuits during the interwar years, including the organization of Russian Famine Relief (later merged into the Canadian Save the Children Fund); the operation of boys and girls clubs in Toronto; and the founding of Camp NeeKauNis.

Haslam was instrumental in organizing the Canadian Friends Service Committee and served as its first executive secretary for 25 years. He also brought Canadian Quakers closer to other groups in the Canadian peace movement, such as the Women's International League for Peace and Freedom, the Fellowship of Reconciliation, and the Student Christian Movement.

Haslam assumed a leading role in the first years of the Conference of Historic Peace Churches, for example as "a special liaison between sectarian pacifists and those from mainstream Protestant churches. Together they ensured, in negotiations with government authorities, the advancement of the right of all Canadians, regardless of religious affiliation, to conscientious objector status..." As World War II progressed he organized and deployed Canadian conscientious objectors to the Friends' Ambulance Unit in China, coordinated an effort to assist German Jewish refugees interned in Canada as enemy aliens, and supported the movement to build intentional community as an experimental base for a future pacifist society.

After World War II,

Haslam turned his attention to the search for Christian unity through the ecumenical movement. He became active in the Canadian Council of Churches and the World Council of Churches in the hope of developing an international spiritual basis for world peace and nuclear disarmament.
