= Canadian Friends Historical Association =

The Canadian Friends Historical Association (CFHA) has been active since 1972 in collecting and publishing the heritage and historical impact of Quakers in Canada. The Association is responsible for two publications, a quarterly newsletter and an annual Canadian Quaker History Journal, and one annual conference in September. The Association maintains a website at www.cfha.info .

The annual conference often meets in places where Quakers made a notable contribution, and the event consists of visiting cemeteries, museums, and markets looking for lost Quaker heritage. For example, in 2008 the CFHA met in Owen Sound, Ontario to explore the Quaker contribution to the Underground Railway in that area.

CFHA is a not-for-profit national body and a registered Canadian charitable organization. All activity and governance are performed by unpaid volunteers, and membership is open to all. CFHA was incorporated under the laws of Ontario in 2011. Although it is not a formal part of any Yearly Meeting of the Religious Society of Friends (Quakers), meetings of the Executive and business conducted are performed in the manner of Friends, and Quaker principles and ethos are maintained.

The association engages in various projects in support of its mission. The oldest project is the Built Heritage Register. The purpose of this register is to document, recognize and, if possible, preserve Quaker-built heritage in Canada such as the John Moore House in Sparta, Ontario. Another project is the Family History Project which seeks to document the lives and experiences of the thousands of descendants of Quaker settlers from the 18th century onwards. A more recent project has been the Transcription of Minute books and Registers of the Nine Partners Meeting in Millbrook, New York which contain many references to Canadian Friends. Other transcriptions such as the West Lake Meeting minutes have been posted online. Another project is to openly identify people of Quaker heritage who have entries in Wikipedia such as Timothy Rogers, Samuel Moore and Charles Ambrose Zavitz.

CFHA actively encourages and supports interest in Canadian Quaker history and research by providing open website access to hundreds of published articles and several monographs it has produced since 1972. The association also sponsors information booths at related conferences, such as the Ontario Genealogical Society and the Ontario Historical Society. The association distributes literature that refers to the Quaker experience in Canada, and works with the Quaker Library and Archives of Canada which is housed in Pickering College to assist people in search of their Quaker genealogy.
