= Pickering College =

Location
- 16945 Bayview Avenue; Newmarket, Ontario, L3Y 4X2; Canada; 44.0470°N 79.4520°W

Information
- School type: Independent
- Motto: Bene Provisa Principia Ponantur ("Let Well Planned Foundations be Laid.")
- Founded: 1842; 184 years ago
- Head of school: Dr. Cinde Lock
- Grades: JK through 12
- Enrollment: 295 day students, 116 boarders (2017)
- Colours: Blue and Silver
- Website: www.pickeringcollege.on.ca

Pickering College is an independent, co-educational school for children in grades from Junior Kindergarten through grade 12. It is located in Newmarket, Ontario in Canada on a 17-hectare (42 acre) property on Bayview Avenue. The school accepts both day students and boarders (Grade 7 through Grade 12 only).

Pickering College is the second oldest independent school in Ontario, after Upper Canada College.

Pickering College is also the site of the Quaker Archives and Library of Canada which are housed in the Arthur Garratt Dorland Reference Library.

== History ==
=== Bloomfield (West Lake), Prince Edward County, 1841 ===
==== Campus ====
The roots of Pickering College trace far back into the 19th century in Bloomfield, a significant Quaker settlement near Picton at West Lake, in Prince Edward County. There, on property (lot 13, concession 2, Military Tract) purchased by Israel Bowrman, a Quaker, a school (or seminary) was eventually established.

It is said that around this time Joseph John Gurney, a prominent Quaker Englishman (considered a 'minister', in the Quaker sense of the term), and brother of Elizabeth Fry, herself a noted advocate of social and prison reform, offered the sum of 500 pounds to the Religious Society of Friends for the establishment of a school there, if they could raise a similar amount.

It is not immediately clear when the building that eventually became the West Lake Boarding School (and still stands today as a private residence) was actually erected. Mr. Bowrman mortgaged the property in 1830, and it is possible these funds were used to build what might have originally been intended as a house, later converted to a school. In either case, in 1841 the building began official use as a school, welcoming first only girls, and later, in 1842, with the construction of a wood framed building to the east, boys.

The main building served three purposes: its top floor served as dormitory for students, the basement served as dining room and servants' quarters, and the first floor acted as classroom and administrative facilities. For its time, the building was rather advanced in some respects, including indoor plumbing featuring a septic tank built of large red cedar logs.

There were a number of other buildings on the property including the boys' residence and other utility buildings, none of which remains today. Compared to the facilities of some of its contemporaries, West Lake Boarding School's were somewhat modest and more remote.

==== Operation ====
In 1848 this school was registered under the name West Lake Friends' or Quakers' Seminary. That it was coeducational was due to the Quakers' belief in the need to educate both sexes. The school was primarily administered and guided by the Quakers and it was non-denominal in nature.

According to historical sources, the school at West Lake was closed in 1865 due to lack of enrollment, partly on account of its difficult accessibility at the time. The property was sold in 1869.

In 1871 the Ontario legislature passed an Act to Incorporate the Trustees of the Friends' Seminary of the Province of Ontario. The Act stated that it was "the opinion of the said yearly meeting of Friends that the usefulness of the said Seminary would be largely increased by changing its location to the Township of Pickering near the village of Duffins Creek". The Act received royal assent on February 15, 1871 and a few years later, construction would begin on the new and modern school in Pickering.

=== Pickering Village, 1877 ===
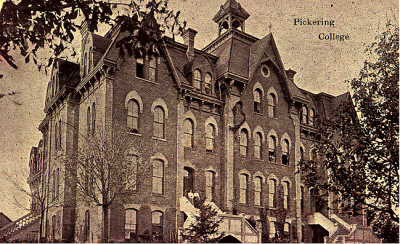
Former Pickering College Campus at Pickering Village

Former Pickering College Campus at Pickering Village

==== Campus ====
In 1877 a successor to the original school near West Lake was constructed on Conc. 2, Lot 13, near the Village of Pickering. It would be a grand building, situated on 2 ha (5 acres) high atop a hill and visible to the town below. It would also be known as a landmark along what was then known as Old Kingston Road, and later as Highway 2.

The main school building, four storeys high in red and white brick [ref], was to be built by an Oshawa contractor for a relatively frugal sum of $24,300 (close to $475,000 in 2006 dollars). It featured a slate roof, arched windows, and a classic belltower over the centre section. It featured two wings that ran some 24 m (80 ft) behind the building, housing up to 75 boarding students, with the girls situated on the east side, boys on the west. The Principal and Matron of the school occupied a wing to the north, complete with living facilities and library. The centre of the school featured a large study room, with a stage for entertainment. It was also used for meetings of the Pickering College Literary Society. The second floor was exclusively classrooms and the third and fourth floors housed the students and teachers. In the basement were the kitchen and dining areas, along with the school's modern science laboratory. The school was said to enjoy a commanding view of its surroundings, including the Village of Pickering below.

The schoolhouse never acquired electricity (electricity was not available in the area, even in the early 20th century). For heat, the building relied on stoves until 1883, when steam heat became available. Indoor plumbing arrived only around 1905, the last year of the building's existence. A former student, Arthur Dorland recalled later in an interview:

"About the time I arrived at the school, inside plumbing had been installed and toilet accommodation had been modernized and enlarged. An adequate supply of water was also ensured by the erection of a windmill at Duffins Creek. which delivered some eight thousand gallons of water daily. This was in addition to the reserve supply in the main well and cisterns at the school. Nevertheless, we still used pitchers and basins in our rooms for washing and we filled our own jugs at a tap in the bathroom."

Having no electricity, the school had no electric lights. "Consequently, coal-oil lamps were used throughout the school for illumination. This presented a serious fire hazard, for oil lamps were always liable to be knocked over, and many a glass chimney was smashed to smithereens in a pillow fight or similar fracas". This dangerous situation was corrected by the installation of an acetelyne gas plant, eliminating the need for the lamps altogether.

In 1899, Sam Rogers (not to be confused with the English poet Samuel Rogers who died 44 years earlier), a Quaker descendant of Timothy Rogers (who had originally helped settle Pickering Village with a number of Quaker families in the early 19th century) donated funds to build an impressive gymnasium to add to the amenities. This building was done in an imposing Greek revival style with high arched windows, and a portico at the front with a roof supported by four large pillars. It would be the only major addition to facilities at the main campus, and would outlive the schoolhouse by some 82 years.

==== Operation ====
Former Pickering College Gym – Purchased by E.L. Ruddy and converted into a summer mansion

Although Pickering College had its roots in the original Friend's Seminary at West Lake, and remained primarily populated by Quaker staff, students, and administrators, the school in fact welcomed students from all walks of life. The students tended to come from families of decent means, as the tuition cost ($165.00 per year in 1893) was considerable to those of lower income, including children of agrarian families, for whom an education was considered unnecessary, since they were expected to maintain their family farms.

The school was guided by the Friends' belief in a high standard of education that emphasized all aspects of human development – academic, spiritual and physical: "The object of Pickering College [was] to secure to its students as thorough an education as can be obtained outside of a University or of a professional school, and at the same time to surround them with all the moral influences and guarded care of a well-conducted home."

The school's emphasis on a well-rounded education included ample opportunities for rigorous exercise: ball fields, rinks and courts, and later the gymnasium surrounded the building. Popular sports included "Association football as well as rugby, where the rules of that day were not so restricted as they are to day, were modified by the good moral atmosphere-for the most part-of the college." The athletic program was not merely extracurricular: "It [was] the chief aim of...the teachers to encourage in students a love of outside exercise, and no pains [would] be spared by the [Friends] Committee to make this a prominent feature of the institution, so that the health of the students may be secured in the best possible way, viz. by fresh air and outdoor recreation."

The school operated until 1885, when litigation between a number of Quaker bodies forced the school to close. The matter settled, the school reopened in 1892, and apparently enjoyed great success: "Mr. W. P. Firth M.A., D.Sc., became principal. With his wife, formerly Miss Ella Rogers B.A., daughter of Samuel Rogers, a well known Toronto figure at that time the school prospered, and attendance grew rapidly. Students came from all over the Continent, as well as from Japan, Russia, China, Persia, Armenia, Australia, Central America and the West Indies. A large number of Jamaicans graduated from the school. Many local students attended both the preparatory, as well as the collegiate departments. In the early nineties the attendance taxed the capacity of the building." Such was the success of the school in the late 1890s that an alumni event in 1894 gathered some 400 students from all over the country.

A number of notable graduates hailed from Pickering College, including university professors, Reverends and businessmen. The school had a business program that was described as "world-class", and even boasted a typewriting class, a first for a North American school. An excellent fine arts program was nourished at the school. The Pickering College Literary society met weekly for "musical recitals, poetry readings, discussions and debates on current issues." The school kept up a column in the local Pickering News "inviting the public to attend special meetings when the Society had a speaker".

The Village of Pickering also enjoyed a close and intimate relationship with the school — many businesses and trades supplied the College's needs, and the Village itself supplied a number of students. An example of the trade links between school and village was a man by the name of William Peak, "who ran a "taxi service" from the Grand Trunk Railway station to the College transporting students".

==== Fire ====
On December 30, 1905, a catastrophic fire broke out in the main building of the College. Although the exact cause was never determined, it was known that the blaze began in the Principal's quarters, and, stoked by high winds, the fire quickly consumed the brick building's wooden inner frame and structure. By dawn the next day, all that remained of the once great school were the charred brick outer walls, along with the Gymnasium, the stables, and a few other brick outbuildings. Nearly all of the school's contents, including valuable records and equipment, were destroyed.

The extent of the damage was enormous; over $50,000 in 1905 dollars, with some $4,000 alone attributed to the loss of the Principal's (Mr. Firth's) library. Rebuilding costs were estimated to be another $30,000 or more over and above that number. Adding to the financial strain was that the school was actually underinsured at the time, the amount actually covered by insurance being less than $13,000.

The fire of 1905 was to have consequences both for the school and for the Village of Pickering itself. A debate over the future of the school ensued, with many alumni, the Village of Pickering itself (fearing a loss of business and tax revenue) and others wishing to rebuild the College on its original site. A period of time passed where the College committee reviewed its options. For a time, Pickering remained the favourite; the local newspaper reported plans to rebuild the school on the same site, even larger than before, with a near doubling of capacity for boarding students. However, this was not to be. A number of towns expressed interest in hosting the College and were perhaps more vocal than the Village of Pickering had been. A new option would eventually come to the fore: the tiny town of Newmarket.

With its larger Quaker community, direct rail link to Toronto, and the ready availability of services to the future campus, logic seemed to dictate a move there, and in 1908, sadness and objections of Alumni notwithstanding, the decision was made to relocate and rebuild the college in Newmarket.

==== Disposition of the Pickering Property ====
The old grounds of Pickering College at Pickering were eventually sold at a distressed price of $11.00 per acre (for a total of $550.00) to a man by the name of Ernest L. Ruddy. Mr. Ruddy, who hailed from Toronto, also bought the surrounding lands for approximately $4320. 16. Ruddy converted the former gymnasium into a large, lavish summer home, complete with mezzanine, four bedrooms created in part by splitting the original single storey building into two. An artesian well was placed close by. Mr. Ruddy called the property 'The Hermitage', and it would continue to serve him and his family until 1960, when it was sold.

The property slowly became derelict in the years following, with the building falling into a serious state of disrepair. Local interest in restoring the former property grew steadily, but no one appeared willing or able to put forward the required $400,000 estimated cost of repair. Passionate supporters of restoration argued that the former residence/school gym was one of few remaining reminders of what had helped put Pickering on the map in the first place, and that the cost was well worth the value in preserving a unique piece of Pickering Village's history. This did not appear to garner much support with the town council of the time: the council felt the structure would be of little value to the community once restored, since there were still no services onsite. The building continued to deteriorate.

==== A Final Fire ====
On October 4, 1987, 110 years after the erection of the original Pickering College and 82 years after its destruction, the sole survivor of the old campus, the gymnasium, also succumbed to fire. The fire began in the evening and completely consumed the building; leaving only the Ruddy family's "wishing well" standing afterwards. With arson suspected, some recriminations followed. Many mourned the loss of a piece of Pickering history, feeling it was a loss that could have been prevented.

Ultimately the property did become a housing development, with only a small portion, designated the "Hermitage Park" remaining. A replica of the original Ruddy well was placed at the site. Of the old school at Pickering Village, nothing now remains. The grounds of the former campus are today mostly covered by modern housing.

=== Campus ===
Rogers House at Pickering College in Newmarket, circa 1920s

The Pickering College name by the early 20th Century had become well established and known in many parts of the world, so despite the move to Newmarket, the old name was retained. A new school building was constructed, once again atop a commanding hill (hence the school's nickname – The Hilltop) and the College reopened in 1909. The striking new four storey building in Newmarket — named Rogers House in honour of Sam Rogers' and his family's contributions to the school — bore similarities to the old one in function (it served both as dormitory and schoolhouse), however it was very different in design. The building's architect was a young John Lyle, who also collaborated on Toronto's Union Station. As in his contribution to Union Station, Lyle included a Georgian-style façade featuring four large pillars. Lyle also suggested a dome for the new building, but this was declined by the Friends, who probably felt it too decadent. Nonetheless, the new building would become a Newmarket landmark, instantly recognizable; its majesty symbolic of great belief the Friends had in a solid education. The four Romanesque columns that adorned the front of the building were eventually given the names Faith, Freedom, Friendship and Fun, to further emphasize the cornerstones of the school's philosophy and educational approach.

As anticipated, the school prospered in its new location. Enrollment gradually increased from opening until a number of years later, when the First World War began to impact on enrolment. In 1916, enrolment declined significantly and the school was closed. The Friends then lent the school property and buildings to the Military Hospital Commission rent-free until other facilities could be built.

Since 1878, the school had operated under the auspices of the Canada Yearly Meeting of Friends. In 1917, an act of the Provincial Legislature transferred the assets, endowments, and property of Pickering College to an independent corporation: still primarily administered and guided by the Friends.

In 1927, for the first time, Pickering College became a boys-only school, and would remain so for the next 65 years. Under Headmaster Joseph McCulley, the school married its traditional Quaker teachings to the progressivism of John Dewey, which called for greater emphasis on problem solving and critical thinking skills rather than rote learning.

As part of the property, adjacent to the campus, a fully operational farm provided food for the school kitchen. In the wintertime, the fields and the slopes down to them could be used by the students for skiing and sledding. More recently, the farm has become a housing development.

Over the years, additions were made to the campus, including the addition of a gymnasium to Rogers House. In 1930, a new residential building which also included two classrooms was built and dedicated to former principal William Firth as Firth House, further adding to the school's capacity for boarding students. Further additions included a running track, four playing fields, and an ice rink. A new dining hall was added in the 1960s. A new student lounge was constructed adjacent to the concourse between Rogers house and the dining hall. A health center is located in New House, staffed by a school nurse, who is on call 24 hours a day for the needs of boarding students.

Current facilities also include a baseball diamond, newly constructed athletic complex and an off-site equestrian facility. The school has a CRTC-licensed radio station and recording studio (102.7 CHOP FM).

==== Fire ====
Rogers House has been involved in two fires, the second time causing extensive damage.

In 1979, fire broke out in the Master's apartment in the Lower South corridor. The fire was caused by a smouldering candle. Student Harry Albright, who was on a spare period in his room opposite the apartment, smelled the smoke and raised the alarm. The fire had already taken hold, but thanks to the quick response of the fire department, damage was confined to the apartment and minor smoke damage on the corridor.

In November, 1981, in a near-repeat of the events of 1905, fire again broke out in Rogers House. Due to some of the more primitive materials used in the building's original construction, the fire accelerated quickly and caused extensive damage to the southern wing of the building and water damaged the school throughout. Thankfully the events of 1905 were not repeated, and the year that followed saw the school embark on a major reconstruction and renovation program.

While construction progressed, a number of the boarding students, along with some classrooms, were temporarily relocated to trailers on the school property. This became somewhat affectionately known as 'Trailer City'.

Ultimately the fire brought about the end of Rogers House's long existence as both dormitory and schoolhouse. Save for the Headmaster's house attached to the back of the building, there would be no living quarters in Rogers House, which from this point forward would house only classrooms, laboratories and the school's administration offices. Drawing from some of the lessons of the 1981 fire, in 1983 a brand new, three storey residence (dubbed New House) for teachers and students was constructed using a cinderblock design to render the building as fireproof as possible. The end of the 1980s also saw the complete renovation of Firth House, again changing the function of a formerly dual-use building – classrooms in Firth House were eliminated in favour of new residences for teachers and the building became entirely residential in nature.

==== The 1990s ====
In 1992 Pickering College celebrated its Sesquicentennial (150th anniversary). Changes included the addition of a lower school (Junior Kindergarten to Grade 6) to the existing middle (Grade 7 and 8) and upper schools (at the time, Grade 9 to OAC).

1992 would also mark the return of coeducation to Pickering College, after nearly seven decades as a boys-only school, with the admission of girls to the lower school. The following year, coeducation was extended to the entire school. After 1992, Firth House would no longer house male students — it became an exclusively female dormitory, with New House remaining for the boys.

The late 1990s again saw upgrades and renovations to campus facilities.

==== The Present ====
With the completion of the new athletic complex (named Egan House as of Sep 30, 2006, in honor of the key role played by the Egan Family Foundation in raising funds for its construction), Pickering College has attained an large array of student facilities, while retaining much of its traditional Quaker heritage and approach to learning.

The school continues to foster athletic achievement: a mandatory after-school activity program ensures that a Pickering student receives excellent physical exercise or a way to express themselves in several different arts-related fields, as well as academic instruction. A drive to expand the physical campus is also underway.

== Tuition and Scholarships ==
Pickering College offers bursaries for students based on financial need, and scholarships based on academic merit and/or evidence of personal qualities and talents that add positive influences to the school.

== Government, Faculty and Staff ==
Pickering College is incorporated under an act of the Legislative Assembly of Ontario. The Corporation of Pickering College, whose 35 members are drawn from the school's extended community is responsible for electing the Pickering College Board of Directors, which in turn reports to the Corporation. The Corporation does not act in a policy or governance role, but rather acts similarly to a senate, primarily in the role of watchdog and "chamber of sober second thought". It approves the Boards' financial statements at the Annual General Meeting.

The Board of Directors has 10 members who are elected from the membership of the Corporation for terms of 3 years. These are also drawn from the ranks of the school's extended community and can include alumni and past faculty. The Board establishes the school's vision, mission and strategic plan, appoints the Headmaster and conducts annual performance reviews, as well as overseeing the school's financial affairs. The Board ultimately reports to the Corporation. As of 2016, the Chair of the Board of Directors is Kelly Mason.

Pickering College faculty consists of Masters (teachers) with a diverse range of qualifications, supervised by the Headmaster. Some faculty (including the Headmaster) live on campus in campus-supplied housing, most live in and around the immediate community. In addition to their regular teaching role Masters also act as academic counsellors for groups of students, overseeing their academic and general progress throughout the school year.

Also among faculty are Junior Masters (tutors) who are often drawn from abroad and assist Masters inside and outside the classroom.

== Headmasters/Principals of Pickering College ==
At Bloomfield (West Lake)

1842–1845 – Mr. Jessie H. Haines
1845–1846 – Mr. Francis Ferris
1846–1857 – Mr. Levi Varney

At Pickering Village

1878–1879 – Mr. Thomas Burgess
1879–1881 – Mr. John E. Bryant
1881–1883 – Mr. S. Percy Davis
1883–1885 – Mr. William H. Huston
1892–1905 – Mr. William P. Firth

At Newmarket

1909–1916 – Mr. William P. Firth
1927–1948 – Mr. Joseph McCulley
1948–1953 – Mr. Robert E. K. Rourke
1953–1978 – Mr. Harry M. Beer – longest serving at 25 years
1978–1995 – Mr. Sheldon H. Clark
1995 – Mr. Peter Sturrup (acting)
1996–2022 – Mr. Peter Sturrup
2022–Present – Dr. Cinde Lock

== Notable alumni and faculty ==
- Charles Beer (born 1941), Liberal Ontario MPP (1987–1995)
- Gabrielle Daleman (born 1998), Olympic medal holder for Team Canada in figure skating
- Iain Duncan (born 1963), professional ice hockey player
- Hugh Edighoffer (1928–2019), Liberal Ontario MPP (1967–1990) and Speaker of the Ontario Legislature (1985–1990)
- John Wendell Holmes (1910–1998), diplomat and academic
- Hal Jackman (born 1932), 25th Lieutenant Governor of Ontario (1991–1997) and Chancellor of the University of Toronto (1997–2003)
- Kenneth McNaught (1918–1997), author and historian
- John Meisel (1923–2025), academic
- R. Dean Taylor (1939–2022), singer/songwriter/producer ("Indiana Wants Me"; Diana Ross & the Supremes, The Temptations, The Four Tops)
- Ethan Werek (born 1991), professional ice hockey player
- Harland Williams (born 1962), actor and comedian

== Pickering as a filming location ==
The Pickering College ice rink is the scene of at least one film and one commercial. In the romantic comedy film The Cutting Edge (1992), starring D. B. Sweeney and Moira Kelly, the rink masquerades as the private training arena of Kelly's leading character.

Pickering College is also featured very briefly in the film The Big Hit (1998), as the high school from which Keiko Nishi (played by China Chow), is kidnapped. Other films that have included location-filming at Pickering College are Blown Away (1992) and A Life Less Gone (2008).

== Houses ==
There are four houses in Pickering College: Gold, Silver, Red and Blue. Each student is randomly assigned to one of the houses upon enrolment. Houses are led by two House Chairs, elected students in grades 11 and 12. The house with the most points at the end of the year is awarded the house banner.
