= Arthur G. Dorland =

- Born: Arthur Garratt Dorland; July 30, 1887; Wellington, Ontario, Canada
- Died: June 26, 1979 (aged 91); Toronto

Arthur Garratt Dorland (July 30, 1887 – June 26, 1979) was Canada's leading historian on the Religious Society of Friends (Quakers) in Canada.

Dorland was born on July 30, 1887, into a Quaker family that had come to Prince Edward County, Ontario with the American Loyalists after the American Revolutionary War. Soon after Dorland was born, his father, John Trumpour Dorland, accepted a post as a Quaker preacher in England. The family lived there until the father died, at which time it returned to Canada.

During his high school years, Dorland attended Pickering College, the Quaker school in Newmarket, Ontario. After high school, he earned his BA at Queen's University in Kingston, Ontario and then returned to teach at Pickering. After 2 years, he continued his studies to earn his MA in 1912 and do post-graduate studies at Yale University.

In 1916, Dorland returned to Queen's University as its first-ever lecturer in American history. During this time, he published his first perspective entitled "The Royal Disallowance in Massachusetts." While this work was primarily interested in British inefficiencies that contributed to the loss of the American Colonies, it did raise the issue of how Quakers were forced to pay the church tax that supported the Presbyterian clergy. Four years later, he accepted a notable promotion to Head of the History Department at the University of Western Ontario in London, Ontario.

In 1927, Dorland earned a PhD for his studies in Quaker history which he published that same year under the title: A History of the Society of Friends (Quakers) in Canada. During his time at Western, he published many other volumes as listed below, and was accepted as a Fellow into the Royal Society of Canada. He retired in 1956, after which the university honoured him with an LLD degree.

Dorland played a valuable role in centralizing early records of the Quakers in Canada. "The grace of God was revealed many times and in many ways in Arthur Dorland's long life. As a result of gathering materials for a history of early Friends in Canada on the occasion of the 50th anniversary of the founding of the orthodox Canada Yearly Meeting he was led into deeper study of Quaker history and also into recognition of the necessity for collecting and caring for the many scattered records of all the three branches of Friends in Canada. These were deposited at the University of Western Ontario's Lawson Library and are the basis of the present Friends Archives."

He regretted that members of Religious Society of Friends had actually been unfriendly towards each other and had split at least twice, once in 1827 and again in the 1840s. He and others worked persistently for re-unification and their goal was realized in 1955 when the major factions held a joint Yearly Meeting.

"In 1932, as Chairman of the Peace Committee, he promoted the idea of an Institute of International Relations. Conferences were held at the YMCA camp, Geneva Park, Lake Couchiching. The Institute later became the Canadian Institute of International Affairs and the well-known Couchiching Conferences." From 1931 he served for 12 years as the Chairman of the Canadian Friends Service Committee, including during World War II; in this role he worked particularly on the campaign for world disarmament and the search for solutions to the social crisis caused by the depression.

Dorland expressed his pacificism in many other leadership roles; for example, in cooperation with the Women's International League for Peace and Freedom, "he helped lead a concerted campaign against cadet training in Canada's schools as well as against militarism in school textbooks"

After his death on June 26, 1979, his library formed the nucleus of the Quaker Library and Archives of Canada at Pickering College in Newmarket, and its quarters were named the Arthur Garratt Dorland Reference Library.

His publications include:

- The Royal Disallowance in Massachusetts, 1917
- A History of the Society of Friends (Quakers) in Canada, 1927
- A Hundred Years of Quaker Education in Canada – the Centenary of Pickering College, 1942
- Our Canada, 1949
- The Republican Tradition in the British Empire and the Commonwealth, 1950
- Recent Developments in Canadian Quakerism, 1955
- The Quakers in Canada: A History, 1968
- Former Days & Quaker Ways, 1968
- Along the Trail of Life: a Quaker retrospect, 1979
