= Ontario Genealogical Society =

The Ontario Genealogical Society
- Formation: 1961
- Type: Registered Charity
- Purpose: Genealogy, family history
- Headquarters: Concord
- Location: Ontario, Canada
- Region served: Ontario
- Official language: English
- Main organ: Board of Directors
- Website: ogs.on.ca

The Ontario Genealogical Society, operating as Ontario Ancestors since early 2019, is the largest organization devoted to research into family history in Ontario, Canada. Founded in 1961 as a Registered Charity corporation, the Society has grown by 2020 to include 30 local branches covering all of Ontario and five Special Interest Groups.

== Objectives ==
The objectives of the Society are:

- To promote genealogical research
- To set standards for genealogical excellence by encouragement and instruction in effective research methods
- To make available to those whose ancestors are from Ontario, the knowledge, diversity and comprehensiveness of the genealogical resources in Ontario

== Activities ==
Professional genealogists from around the province recommend membership in the Ontario Genealogical Society. To fulfill its mandate of helping those who are tracing their family roots, the Society's members are involved in a variety of activities such as:

- Holding regular branch meetings in each area of Ontario with expert speakers and panel discussions, to which the general public is invited. Topics are not limited to Ontario research, but have a world wide scope.
- Organizing genealogical seminars, workshops, displays, presentations, bus trips, etc. throughout Ontario
- Locating, rescuing and preserving heritage documents
- Digitizing documents and making them available online
- Transcribing and indexing hand-written documents
- Transcribing and photographing pioneer gravestones
- Advocating for the release of government and other historical documents to public view
- Advocating for the preservation of pioneer cemeteries

== Heritage societies ==
The Society has organized certificate programs for those who are proud that their ancestors were part of Ontario's early heritage:

- War of 1812 Society
- Centenary Club
- 1837 Rebellion Society
- Upper Canada Society.

== Annual conference ==
Each year, the Society organizes a family history conference in a different part of the province. In 2018 the Conference was in Guelph, Ontario, in 2019 in London, and the 2020 Conference will be held in Hamilton. Genealogists and family historians from all over North America attend these conferences to exchange information, and to learn about new resources and research techniques. This conference also arranges for information booths from similar organizations, such as the Canadian Friends Historical Association to facilitate networking, as well as exhibits and presentation from commercial providers such as Ancestry, MyHeritage and Family Tree Maker.

== Branches ==
The Ontario Genealogical Society's branches are spread all over Ontario. Each branch takes responsibility for carrying out the Society's objectives in local communities. Members of the public can find information about the branches nearest them by checking the section of the Ontario Ancestors website devoted to Branches/SIGs. https://ogs.on.ca/branchessigs/branch-sig-locator/

== Publications ==
The Society produces a quarterly publication called Families. Many of the branches also produce regular newsletters.

The Ontario Genealogical Society supports the efforts of Ontario genealogists and historians by publishing and selling books of interest to them. As of a 2012 count, the Society had published about 140 books.
