= Mongolia, Ontario =

Mongolia California Corners
- Unincorporated community
- Interactive map of Mongolia
- Coordinates: 43°56′31″N 79°13′34″W
- Country: Canada
- Province: Ontario
- Regional municipality: York
- City: Markham
- Established: 1865
- Elevation: 242 m (794 ft)
- Time zone: UTC-5 (EST)
  - Summer (DST): UTC-4 (EDT)
- Area codes: 905 and 289

Mongolia is a historical community in Markham, Ontario centred on 10th Line (Reesor Road) and Elgin Mills Rd. East, immediately south of the Town of Whitchurch-Stouffville. The hamlet lies completely within the expropriated federal Pickering Airport lands and also within the boundaries of the Rouge National Urban Park.

== History ==
The first settler at Mongolia was Peter de Guerre (Degeer), 1772–1827, a French Huguenot, who acquired lot 26, concession 9 in 1801 and lot 25, concession 9 in 1803. Pennsylvania Dutch (Mennonite) families began to settle in the area in the 1820s. In 1824, a tavern licence was granted using the name California Corners.

During the Upper Canada Rebellion, William Lyon Mackenzie's troops apparently designated a large elm tree in Mongolia on Elgin Mills/18th Ave, between concessions 9 and 10 as a rallying point. The Mackenzie's supporters raised a flag on the tree and drove a keg of spikes into the tree to prevent the opposition from cutting it down; the elm stood until 1973.

In 1865, David Nighswander (lot 25, concession 10) requested a post office for the community, and chose the name "Mongolia" from a list of possible names after he was told the name "California" was already in use in Canada. The community had a general store, an inn (which burned down in 1870), a blacksmith shop, wagon-making shop, a cobbler shop, and a Temperance Hall. In the early years, school was held in the general store at the corners. In 1855, a wooden-frame school (S.S. #22) was built on the east side of the 10th Line on lot 26. In 1882, a new school was built on the west side of 10 Line on lot 26, and it remained in use until 1964. Beside the original schoolhouse was a Wesleyan Methodist church which existed for only short time; it was torn down and moved to concession 9 in 1877 and land now Bushwood Golf Course.

When the rail lines to Stouffville and Claremont by-passed Mongolia, the area reverted to farmland.

In March 1972, the federal government announced plans for a future international airport on the Pickering side of the York-Durham Line. The lands around Mongolia were expropriated for the Pickering Airport. The last merchant in Mongolia closed his business on Dec. 31, 1974. Very few original families live in the area; most of the homes in Mongolia have been boarded or demolished. The land has been rented by the federal government to local farmers since expropriation.

== Rouge National Urban Park ==
In 2011 the federal government announced plans for Rouge National Urban Park that could also include the expropriated federal lands west of the York-Durham Line, including the land around Mongolia.
