= Canadian Friends Service Committee =

Canadian charity

- Abbreviation: CFSC
- Formation: 1931
- Type: Religious organizations based in Canada
- Legal status: active
- Purpose: advocate and public voice, educator and network
- Headquarters: Toronto, Ontario
- Region served: Canada
- Official language: English; French
- Website: Canadian Friends Service Committee http://quakerservice.ca/

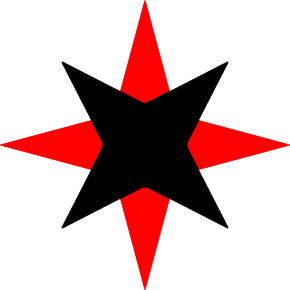

The Canadian Friends Service Committee (CFSC) is a charity that acts on the peace and social justice concerns of the Religious Society of Friends (Quakers) in Canada.

Quaker service work is rooted in the daily practice of pacifism, integrity, truthfulness, equality, community, simplicity and, above all, love both in the objectives of its work and in the discernment with which it plans and delivers its work.

== History ==
Canadian Friends Service Committee (CFSC) was founded in 1931 when members of the Religious Society of Friends or "Quakers" wanted a vehicle to act upon their peace and social justice concerns. That year, Fred Haslam "was instrumental in the organization of the CFSC, and, as its executive secretary for the next twenty-five years, he was personally responsible for the day-to-day direction of its activities, especially those concerning world peace and the abolition of capital punishment".

Since its founding, CFSC has worked on many projects related to peace and justice.

In 1947, the Religious Society of Friends (Quakers) received the Nobel Peace Prize for its service work during World War II. All of the Service Committees work is honoured by the Prize and the ethics that garnered it continue to inform CFSC's work today.

Between 1959 and 1963, during the Vietnam War, CFSC sent medical aid to Vietnam to be used by victims on all sides of the conflict in accordance with Quaker's tradition of relief work that cuts across the boundaries of war and conflict. Many American Quaker's knowingly contravened U.S. law by contributing to this work through CFSC.

In 1976, CFSC and Canadian Quaker's worked with partners to secure the abolition of the death penalty.

Since 2003, CFSC has been helping American soldiers and their families who refused to participate in the Iraq War and came to Canada seeking refuge.

In 2014, CFSC was one of two non-Indigenous organizations asked to intervene in the Supreme Court in the Tsilhqot'in Nation land rights case, it encouraged the Court to adopt an approach to Indigenous land rights that would be consistent with international human rights standards, including the United Nations Declaration on the Rights of Indigenous Peoples. The Court later unanimously recognized the Tsilhqot'in peoples right to control their traditional territory.

== Program Committees ==
- Quaker Indigenous Rights Committee (QIRC)

Friends have traditionally had a concern for the rights of Indigenous Peoples. In 1974 individual Quakers (Friends) were led to go to Kenora in Northern Ontario to attempt reconciliation in a confrontation over mercury contamination of the waterways. Friends with skills in pathology and medicine assisted the Indigenous community, whose people were suffering from mercury poisoning, by helping to document the problem and to provide medical treatment. The Quaker Committee on Native Concerns (now Quaker Indigenous Rights Committee) was born out of this work and other concerns, especially amongst Friends in western Canada. Since then the committee has supported Indigenous community building initiatives, and urged governments to live up to their legal commitments to Indigenous peoples including Esgenoopetitj (Burnt Church) in New Brunswick, Pimicikamak Cree Nation in northern Manitoba and the Lubicon in northern Alberta. Since the mid-1990s, QIRC has worked with others at the United Nations towards the development and recognition of an international instrument specifically addressing the rights of Indigenous Rights through the UN Declaration on the Rights of Indigenous Peoples. CFSC is one of the founding members of the Coalition for the Human Rights of Indigenous Peoples. This group of Indigenous and Non-Indigenous partners work together to inform and educate Canadian people and politicians on work related to the UN Declaration.

- Quakers Fostering Justice (QFJ)

In 1972, CFSC established the Quaker Committee on Jails and Justice (now called Quakers Fostering Justice, QFJ) which has worked to encourage prison visiting, sought alternatives to prisons, and fostered awareness of the roots of crime and violence in society. QFJ promotes restorative justice and has supported the Alternatives to Violence Project. In 1981, Canadian Yearly Meeting (Canadian Quakers) minuted: "Prison abolition is both a process and a long-term goal. In the interim there is a great need for Friends to reach out and to support all those affected: guards, prisoners, victims, and families. We recognize a need for restraint of those few who are exhibiting dangerous behaviour. The kind of restraint used and the help offered during that time must reflect our concern for that of God in every person."

- Quaker Peace Committee (QPC)

Quaker Peace Committee (QPC), formerly Quaker Peace and Sustainable Communities Committee (QPASCC), exists to put into practice the Quaker Testimonies through projects, education, and public witness designed to alleviate suffering and poverty, promote justice, sustainable livelihoods and peace. The work of QPC is guided by the Quaker Testimonies of Peace, Simplicity, Community, Equality and Integrity. QPC works in partnership with communities, both domestically and internationally.

QPAC's work is rooted in mutual learning, which is the traditional Quaker practice of encouraging exchange, cooperation, education, and relationship amongst partners and participants in projects, overseas or in Canada. Lessons learned through our grassroots experience inform policy and education work in Canada. Generally speaking, projects are designed to have long-term results and develop self-reliance, as well as to respond to practical needs.

Using Quaker practice and in worshipful discernment, QPC provides concrete assistance and engages in policy dialogue towards peaceful, sustainable communities worldwide. QPC's work and experience is shared with Quakers and other people through education and partnership-building. In this way, QPC hopes to contribute to the social transformation necessary to achieve their goal that one day all people might be free from suffering, persecution and repression, and instead enjoy their rights to dignity, sustainable livelihoods, social inclusion and expression.

== See also ==
- American Friends Service Committee
- Quaker Peace and Social Witness
