= West Lake, Ontario =

Community in Prince Edward County, Ontario

Coordinates: 43.925°N 77.262°W

Location of West Lake in Ontario

West Lake is a rural community in Prince Edward County, Ontario. It is situated on the south shore of a bay of Lake Ontario which is known as West Lake.
