= Timothy Rogers (Quaker leader) =

Canadian Quaker leader (1756–1834)

Timothy Rogers (1756–1834) was a Quaker settler. He is notable for founding Quaker settlements that eventually became Newmarket and Pickering in what is now Ontario, Canada.

== Life and work ==
Rogers was born into poverty in Lyme, Connecticut Colony, on May 22, 1756. His ties are to James Rogers (c. 1615-before 1687), whom is believed to have arrived in America before 1646 from Stratford, Warwickshire, England as part of the Puritan migration to New England. He was born out of wedlock to Timothy Rogers Sr. (1735-1774) and Mary Huntley and treated like an orphan. He spent most of his childhood hired out to earn his own keep, and had only three weeks of formal education. Though raised in Baptist circles, in his early twenties, Rogers joined the Religious Society of Friends (Quakers). Rogers and his wife pioneered farms in Danby, Vermont, Saratoga, New York, and then Ferrisburgh, Vermont. This was a common pattern in those days; the family would buy, or be granted, a plot of undeveloped land, develop it, then sell it and take the profits to buy a bigger plot.

In the mid-1790s, Rogers visited fellow Quakers such as Samuel Moore in Annapolis County, Nova Scotia, and Seth Coleman in Dartmouth, Nova Scotia, but he decided on Upper Canada for his next frontier adventure.

“In 1797 Timothy Rogers placed before his Monthly Meeting ‘a desire to go westward to look for some new settlements’. But he met with no encouragement from the overseers of the meeting so he dropped the subject for a time.” However, the sense of calling remained and “Rogers came to Yonge Street from Vermont in 1800…. He obviously liked what he saw, for he agreed to settle forty farms of two hundred acres each in the district. In the winter of 1800-1801, Rogers and his family moved, by sleigh in the dead of winter, to Yonge Street." This group of pioneers met all the conditions of land grants and by 1804, they were also recognized as an official meeting of the Religious Society of Friends. The Yonge Street settlement grew into the town of Newmarket.

In 1809, Rogers started a second Quaker colony in Pickering. He believed this was his calling in life. In his journal, he declared, “It is well known I have a great gift from the Lord to settle new country; I have settled eight new farms or plantations, laid out one town, where I went first. “ There were already Quaker colonies at Pelham in the Niagara Peninsula and Adolphustown on the Bay of Quinte that had been started by refugees fleeing persecution by Patriots during the American Revolutionary War. Rogers saw the need to have a Quaker meeting house at a central location between Newmarket and the earlier colonies. The Meeting House at 17030 Yonge Street, built in 1810, still stands.

Rogers started by buying 800 acres and then moving “his family from Yonge Street to Duffin’s Creek, where he operated what was probably the first grist and saw mill in the township.” In 1810, he “went back to the United States and returned with another company of settlers who were settled in Pickering Township, east of Duffin’s Creek. For his services, Rogers received a grant of several hundred acres of land near the present village of Pickering.”

== Death and legacy ==
Rogers died in 1834, after 2 marriages and 21 children. He is buried in the Friends Cemetery at Mill Street south of Kingston Road in Ajax, Ontario. His journal has been re-published by the Canadian Friends Historical Association.

His great grandson was Elias Rogers, a Canadian coal tycoon and bank executive.

His further descendants went on to become one of the leading families in telecommunications in Canada, including:

- Edward S. Rogers Sr., a pioneer in the Canadian radio industry;
- Edward S. Rogers Jr., the founder of Rogers Communications;
- Edward S. Rogers III, former chairman of Rogers Communications.

Another branch of his family is active in the Canadian Friends Historical Association.
