= Wardens and chairs of Peel Region =

Wardens and Chairs list

This is a list of the Wardens and Chairs of the Regional Municipality of Peel, Ontario an administrative area located west of Toronto.

Sortable table
Year	Warden/Chair	Representing	Notes
1867	John Barnhardt	Village of Streetsville	
1868–1870	Kenneth Chisholm	Village of Brampton	
1871–1872	Thomas Bowles	Chinguacousy Township	
1873–1874	Robert Cotton	Toronto Township	
1875	William Porter	Toronto Gore Township	
1876	Henry Bracken	Caledon Township	
1877–1878	Sir Melville Parker	Toronto Township	
1879	Richard Hewson	Chinguacousy Township	
1880	Alexander McLaren	Caledon Township	
1881	Thomas Swinarton	Albion Township	
1882	J. P. Hutton	Chinguacousy Township	
1883	M. W. Cook	Toronto Township	
1884	William Porter	Toronto Gore Township	
1885	W. A. McCulla	Town of Brampton	
1886	Alexander Cunnington	Chinguacousy Township	
1887	George Atkinson	Caledon Township	
1888	H. H. Bolton	Village of Bolton	
1889	William Andrew	Village of Streetsville	
1890	W. R. Wright	Toronto Township	
1891	Walter Watson	Toronto Gore Township	
1892	John Groat	Chinguacousy Township	
1893	Richard Blain	Town of Brampton	
1894	Thomas Hanna	Albion Township	
1895	R. B. Henry	Caledon Township	
1896	Henry Shook	Toronto Township	
1897	John Graydon	Village of Streetsville	
1898	Reuben S. Lightheart	Chinguacousy Township	
1899	Thomas D. Norval	Town of Brampton	
1900	Robert Johnston	Caledon Township	
1901	William G. Lyons	Chinguacousy Township	
1902	G. R. Anderson	Town of Brampton	
1903	S. A. Egan	Village of Bolton	
1904	James Jackson	Town of Brampton	
1905	Edward J Ellis	Caledon Township	
1906	George T. Ward	Toronto Gore Township	
1907	C. A. Irvine	Town of Brampton	
1908	T. I. Bowie	Village of Streetsville	
1909	F. J. Jackson	Toronto Township	
1910	Peter Speirs	Chinguacousy Township	
1911	John A. McBride	Caledon Township	
1912	John S. Beck	Town of Brampton	
1913	John H. Moffat	Albion Township	
1914	William Rutledge	Toronto Township	
1915	J. J. Porter	Toronto Gore Township	
1916	Guy Bell	Chinguacousy Township	
1917	William J. Limebeer	Caledon Township	
1918	D. H. McCaugherty	Toronto Township	
1919	E. A. Walshaw	Village of Bolton	
1920	W. D. Bowles	Chinguacousy Township	
1921	R. M. Parkinson	Village of Port Credit	
1922	E. A. Orr	Toronto Township	
1923	O. R. Church	Village of Streetsville	
1924	T. H. Elliott	Chinguacousy Township	
1925	L. H. Pallett	Toronto Township	
1926	W. N. Riddell	Albion Township	
1927	W. J. Beatty	Town of Brampton	
1928	N. S. Lindsay	Toronto Gore Township	
1929	John J. Jamieson	Toronto Township	
1930	H. C. Thompson	Village of Port Credit	
1931	John Willis	Caledon Township	
1932	Robert Smith	Village of Bolton	
1933	Ernie McCulloch	Town of Brampton	
1934	O. H. Downey	Albion Township	
1935	William Hostrawser	Toronto Gore Township	
1936	William G. Denison	Toronto Township	
1937	D. W. Moran	Chinguacousy Township	
1938	G. F. Skinner	Village of Port Credit	
1939	W. A. Bates	Town of Brampton	
1940	A. D. McBride	Caledon Township	
1941	E. D. Maguire	Toronto Township	
1942	A. E. Sherman	Chinguacousy Township	
1943	C. E. Cantelon	Village of Streetsville	
1944	John G. Hooper	Toronto Gore Township	
1945	Cecil Gott	Village of Bolton	
1946	H. R. Lawrence	Town of Brampton	
1947	J. W. Davis	Toronto Township	
1948	J. M. Fraser	Chinguacousy Township	
1949	Dr. M. M. Fletcher	Village of Port Credit	
1950	D. S. Dunton	Toronto Township	
1951	O. J. Hardwick	Village of Bolton	
1951	J. A. McLaughlin	Town of Brampton	
1951	G. H. Montemurro	Village of Streetsville	
1951	G. F. Skinner	Village of Port Credit	
1952	J. E. Patterson	Albion Township	
1953	J. S. Scott	Caledon Township	
1954	J. C. Saddington	Village of Port Credit	
1955	N. J. Black	Toronto Gore Township	
1956	W. C. Arch	Village of Streetsville	
1957	C. C. Core	Town of Brampton	
1958	Cyril Clark	Chinguacousy Township	
1959	Mary Fix	Toronto Township	
1960	Wilton E. Downey	Village of Bolton	
1961	Roderick Johnston	Albion Township	
1962	T. W. Glassford	Caledon Township	
1963	Robert Speck	Toronto Township	
1964	C. F. Kline	Town of Brampton	
1965	T. E. McCollum	Village of Port Credit	
1966	J. J. Graham	Village of Streetsville	
1967	Cyril Clark	Chinguacousy Township	
1968	E. W. Martin		
1969	Nance Horwood	Town of Brampton	
1970	J. I. McMullin	Township of Albion	
1971–1972	Lou H. Parsons	Town of Mississauga	
1973	J. Ivor McMullin	Township of Albion	
1974–1979	Lou Parsons	Region of Peel	
1979–1991	Frank Bean	Region of Peel	
1991–2014	Emil Kolb	Region of Peel	
2015–2018	Frank Dale	Region of Peel	
2018-	Nando Iannicca	Region of Peel	
