= Airport Road (Ontario) =

Road in Ontario, Canada

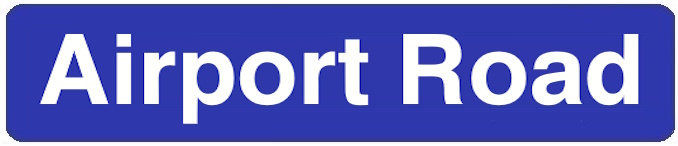
- Peel Regional Road 7 Dufferin County Road 18
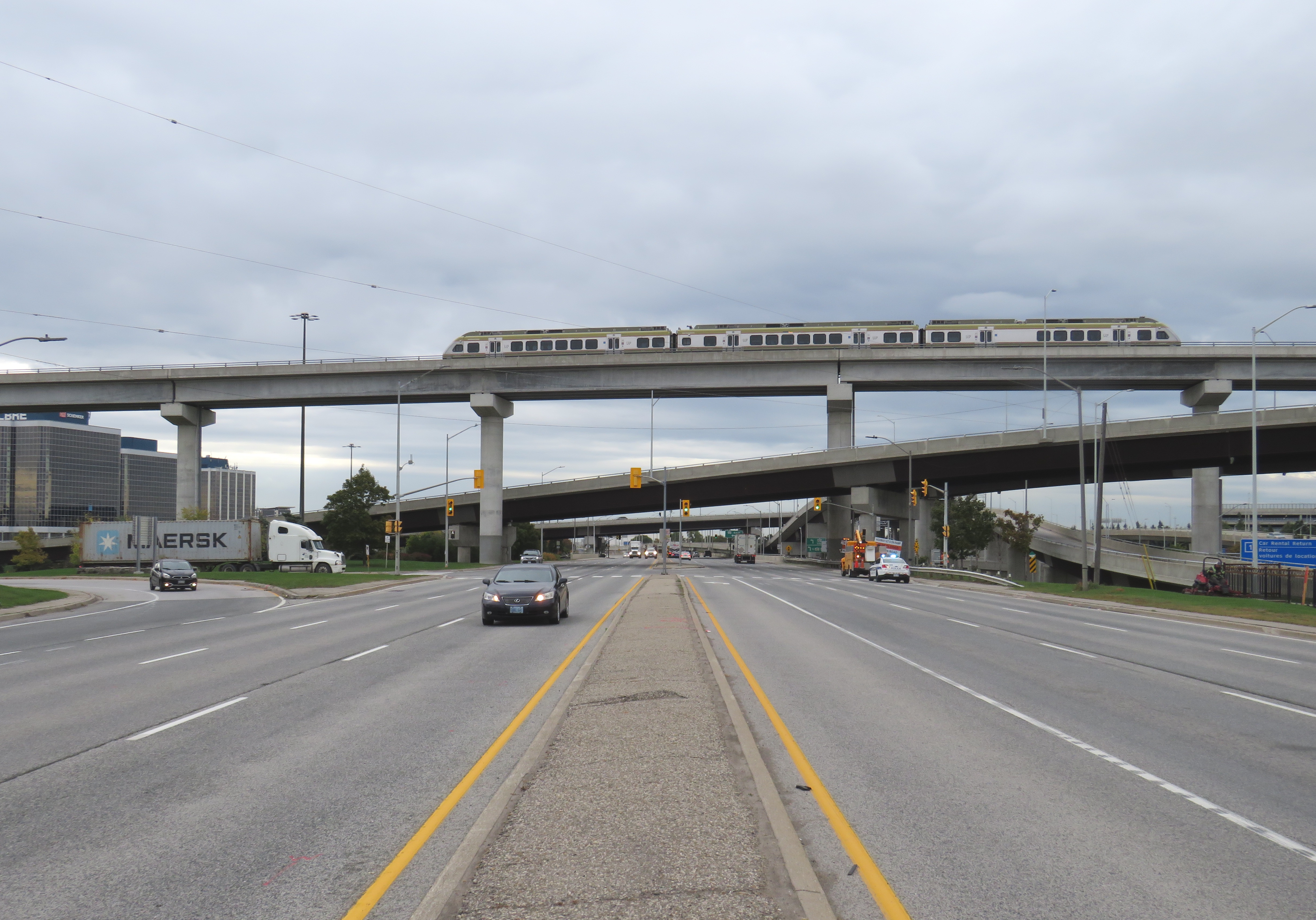
- Airport Road by Toronto Pearson International Airport in Mississauga with a Union Pearson Express train passing overhead

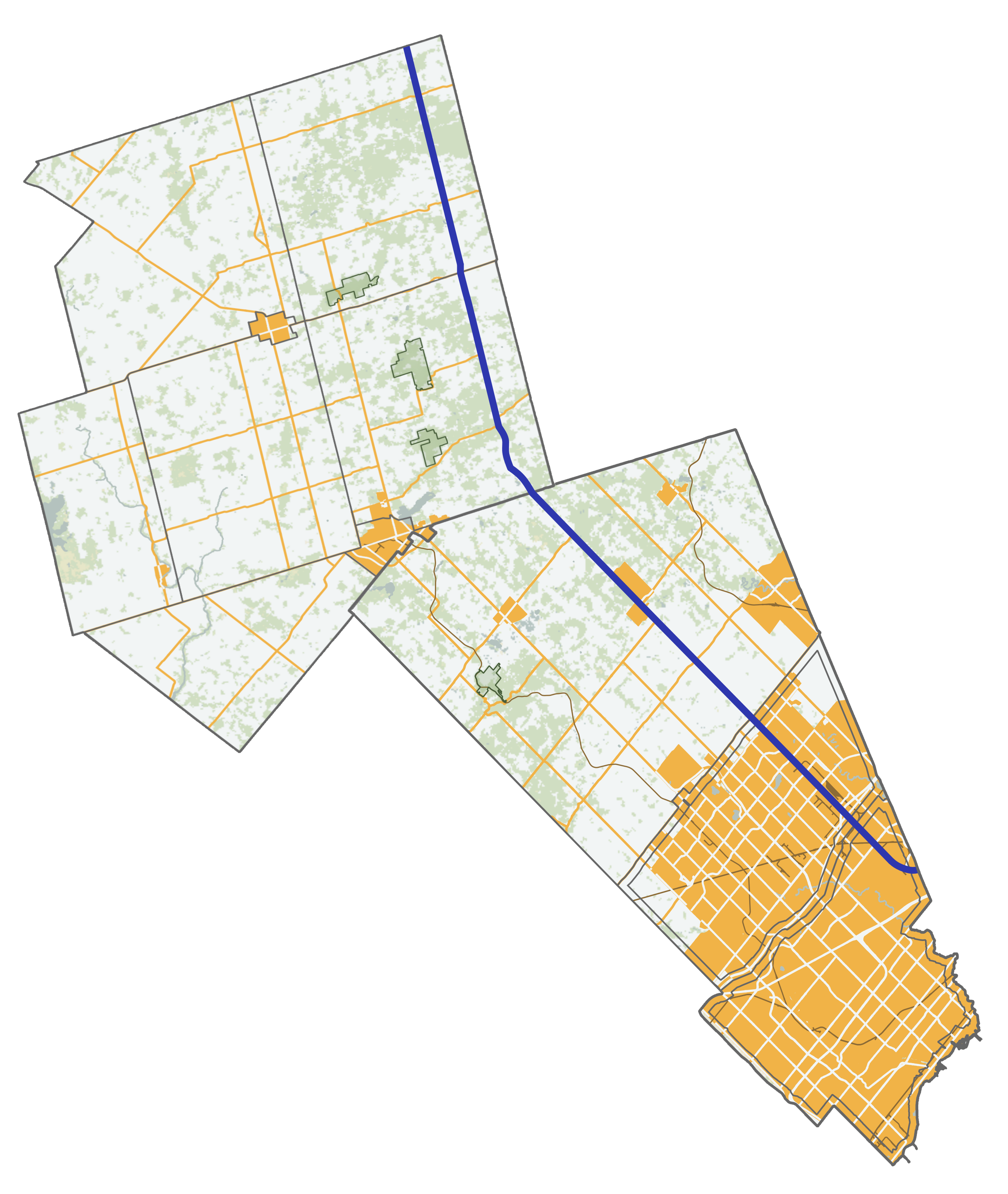
- Route of Airport Road in Peel Region and Dufferin County (blue line)
- Namesake: Toronto Pearson International Airport
- Maintained by: Region of Peel; Dufferin County
- Length: 81.0 km (50.3 mi)
- Location: City of Mississauga; City of Brampton; Town of Caledon; Town of Mono; Mulmur Township
- South end: Highway 427 at the Mississauga/Toronto boundary. (Continues east as Dixon Road)
- Major junctions: Highway 409; Derry Road; Steeles Avenue; 407 ETR; Queen Street; Williams Parkway; Bovaird Drive; Sandalwood Parkway / Humberwest Parkway; Mayfield Road; King Street; Olde Base Line; Charleston Sideroad; Highway 9; Hockley Road; Highway 89; 10 Sideroad; 25 Sideroad
- North end: Mulmur-Nottawasaga Townline (Continues as Simcoe County Road 42)

Other
Nearby arterial roads
← Dixie Road; Highway 10 / Hurontario Street; Simcoe Road 124	Goreway Drive; Coleraine Drive; Highway 50 / Simcoe Road 50; Simcoe Road 10 →

Airport Road is an 81 km (50 mile) major north–south urban and rural thoroughfare in Ontario, Canada, running through the Regional Municipality of Peel and Dufferin County. In combination with its continuation, Simcoe County Road 42, and in turn a portion of Highway 26 north of Stayner, it is a popular non-highway route (as an alternative to Highway 10 and former Highway 24) from the Greater Toronto Area to the Georgian Triangle, in particular the tourist towns of Wasaga Beach, Collingwood, and The Blue Mountains. It is named for Toronto Pearson International Airport, which it passes at its southern terminus.

It is designated Peel Regional Road 7 in Peel and Dufferin County Road 18 in Dufferin. In Peel, it follows the sixth Concession road east of Hurontario Street, and was numbered Sixth Line East. Despite Airport Road transitioning into Simcoe Road 42 and not reaching Stayner, the latter is commonly referred to as part of Airport Road and signage in Stayner indicates Airport Road reaching the intersection where Highway 26 makes a turn.

== Route description ==
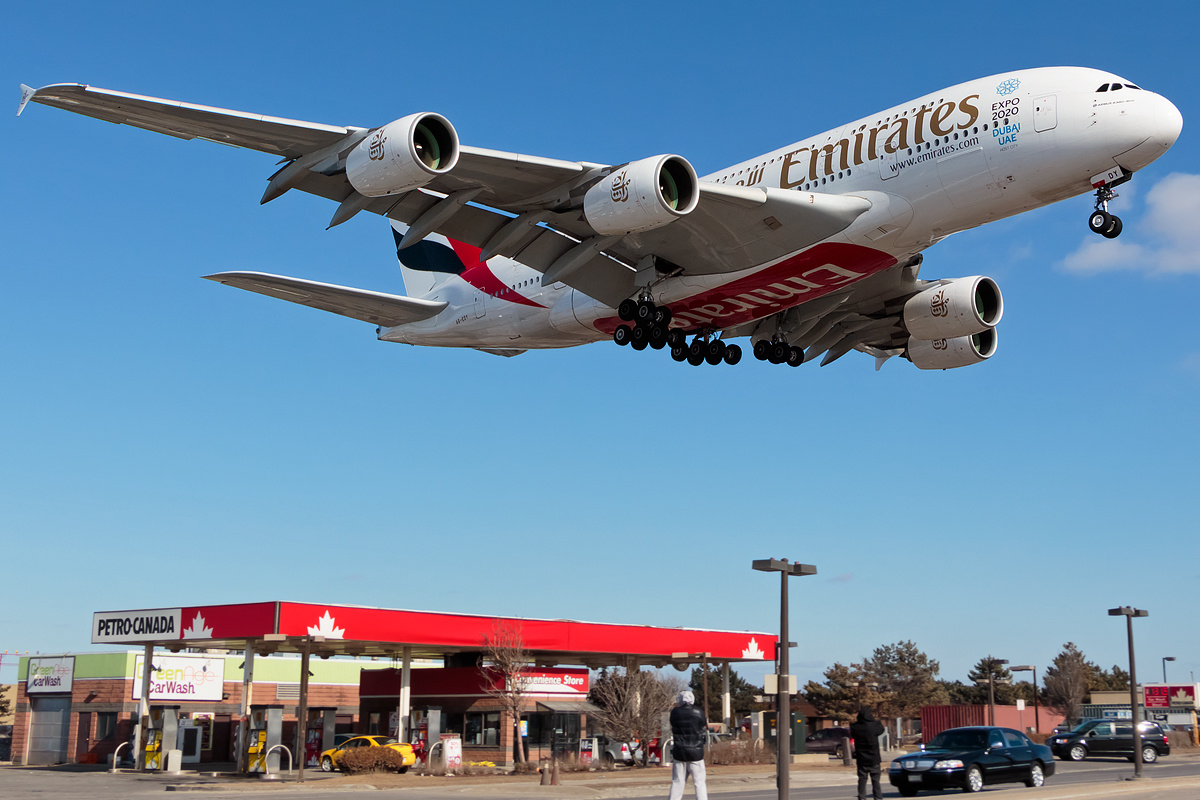
Planespotters watching an Airbus A380 landing at Pearson Airport passing low over Airport Rd.

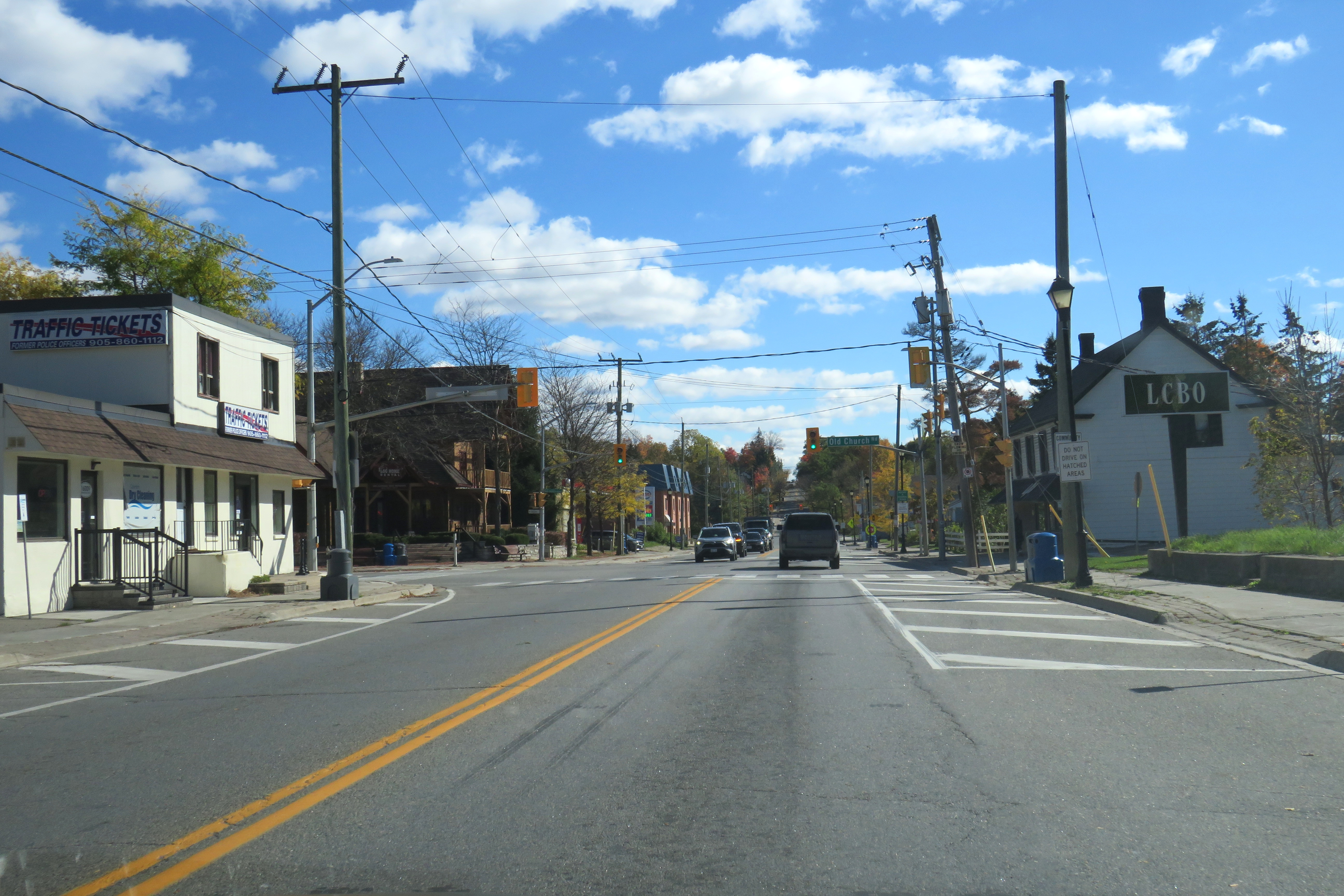
Airport Rd. in Caledon East

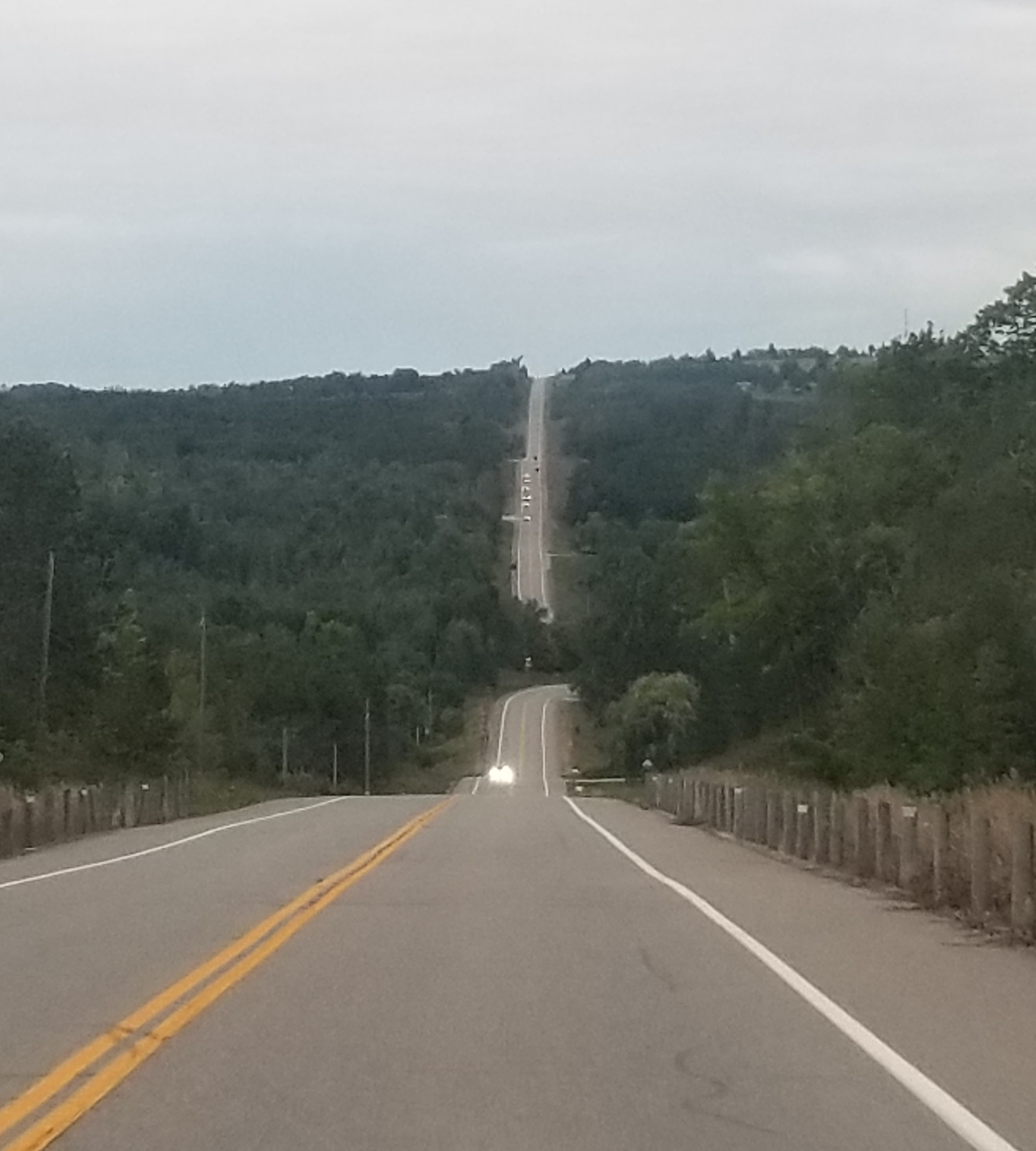
Airport Rd. passing through the hilly terrain of the Niagara Escarpment

Airport Road begins at Highway 427 in Mississauga, initially tracing a broad curve as a continuation of Toronto's east–west Dixon Road near the main street entrance of Pearson Airport to the west. Shortly after, it passes both over and under Highway 409 and its complicated ramps that serve as the airport's freeway access. Just to the north it passes under the elevated tracks of the Union Pearson Express, an airport rail link running to Downtown Toronto, and the guideway of the Terminal Link, the airport's automated people mover. It then straightens to join the main road grid and runs northwest, passing the operations centre for Air Canada, the airport's cargo facilities, and the east end of Runway 36R, a popular location for planespotting. At Derry Road, the street enters the Malton neighbourhood, dipping under the tracks hosting GO Transit's Kitchener Line commuter trains just north of the intersection. It enters Brampton, south of Steeles Avenue and then interchanges with Highway 407 (Exit 53). Airport Road continues through more industrial areas, passing under the rail spur serving the Brampton Assembly (Stellantis Canada) auto plant. At Bovaird Drive, it forms the boundaries of two residential districts; Springdale and Castlemore, and at Mayfield Road enters the largely rural Town of Caledon, although a suburban warehouse district is under development for a short distance north of Mayfield.

From there, the road finally leaves urbanized areas and becomes rural, narrowing down to two lanes, soon after passing through the adjacent communities of Mono Road and Caledon East, through which the Trans-Canada Trail passes. North of Caledon East it enters the Oak Ridges Moraine and the first of the trademark hills that define much of rural Airport Road. At Highway 9, it runs through the rural community of Mono Mills as it leaves Peel Region and enters Dufferin County, where the hills become steeper as it traverses the Niagara Escarpment. Airport Road is notorious for having a high collision rate in this area, and signs advise motorists of that fact.

Airport Road ends at the boundary of Simcoe County where it transitions into Simcoe Road 42, which continues it into the community of Stayner (through which it is named King Street) where Highway 26 continues it in turn after turning into it from the east, forming the continuous route into the aforementioned tourist towns in the Georgian Triangle.

== History ==
The historic townships in the former Peel County, with Airport Rd. (green line) serving as the divide between the eastern and western townships

Airport Road was originally named the Mono Mills Plank Road, as it was a main historic plank road to Mono Township. Originally the road's southern terminus was at what is today Eglinton Avenue, with the present realignment to tie into Dixon Road being constructed during the late 1950's and early 1960's coinciding the expansion of Pearson Airport, with a short stub remaining south of Highway 401 until the mid-1980's, when it was removed due to the development of the Airport Corporate Centre.

In Peel County (now Peel Region), Airport Road served as the north-south dividing line between the original five townships within the county; with Caledon, Chinguacousy, and Toronto (not to be confused with the City of Toronto), to the west, and Albion and Toronto Gore to the east. Airport Road ceased being said divide after the county was restructured into the present regional municipality with the five townships incorporated into the three present lower-tier municipalities (Mississauga, Brampton, and Caledon) that each span its width in 1974.

== Public transit ==
Airport Road is served by eight bus routes in Mississauga and Brampton: one by MiWay, three by Brampton Transit, and three by the Toronto Transit Commission (TTC). MiWay's Route 7 Airport (originating at the City Centre Transit Terminal) provides 24-hour local service along the street from Pearson Airport to Westwood Square Mall. Brampton Transit's 30 Airport Road runs local from Westwood Square Mall north to Mayfield Road in Brampton, and an express route, 115 Airport Express, serves the road from the airport north to Derry Road before turning west and then north on Bramalea Road. Brampton Transit also operates a bus rapid transit route; 505 Züm Bovaird, along Airport Road from the Viscount Terminal Link station at the airport north to Bovaird Drive before turning west to serve Bovaird. The TTC's 52 Lawrence West bus has three branches that run west from Lawrence subway station in Toronto, with an "A" branch terminating at the airport, and the "B" and "D" bypassing it and running to either Westwood Square Mall or McNaughton Avenue, with the "B" branch duplicating the service of the Miway 7 Airport bus along Airport Road. The TTC also serves the airport with three overnight routes. A separate fare (either MiWay or TTC fare) is charged (for cash payments) west of the airport if continuing to or from Toronto and/or Mississauga.

The major routes serving the street are:

Mississauga (MiWay and Toronto Transit Commission):

Route		Direction and Termini				Note
7	Airport	NB	To Westwood Square Mall (via Renforth station, Pearson Airport Terminal 1, and Morning Star Drive)	SB	To Mississauga City Centre Transit Terminal (via Morning Star Drive, Pearson Airport Terminal 1, and Renforth station)	Operates 24 hours

One daytime TTC route, 52 Lawrence West, has three branches which continue northwest along Airport Road from Toronto.

Route		Direction and Termini				Notes
52A	Lawrence West	NB	To Pearson Airport	SB	To Lawrence subway station (via Lawrence West subway station)	Extra fare (if paying with cash) required if continuing to/from Toronto (53B/D branches); 52B branch operates weekdays only; 52D branch operates weekends and holidays only.
52B	Lawrence West	NB	To Westwood Square Mall (via Morning Star Drive, bypassing Pearson Airport)	SB	To Lawrence station (via Lawrence West station, bypassing Pearson Airport)	Extra fare (if paying with cash) required if continuing to/from Toronto (53B/D branches); 52B branch operates weekdays only; 52D branch operates weekends and holidays only.
52D	Lawrence West	NB	To McNaughton Avenue (bypasses Pearson Airport)	SB	To Lawrence station (via Lawrence West station, bypassing Pearson Airport)	Extra fare (if paying with cash) required if continuing to/from Toronto (53B/D branches); 52B branch operates weekdays only; 52D branch operates weekends and holidays only.

The TTC also operates three overnight "Blue Night" routes to Pearson Airport that all briefly follow Airport Road west of Highway 427: 300A Bloor-Danforth, 332A Eglinton, and 352 Lawrence West.

Brampton (Brampton Transit):

Route		Direction and Termini			
30	Airport Road	NB	To Mayfield Road (or AMB Distribution Centre limited service only)	SB	To Westwood Square Mall
115	Airport Express	NB	To Bramalea Terminal (via Derry and Bramalea Roads and Bramalea GO Station)	SB	To Pearson Airport Terminal 1
505	Züm Bovaird	NB	To Mount Pleasant GO Station (via Bovaird Drive and Trinity Common Terminal)	SB	To Viscount Terminal Link station
