= List of roads in Brampton =

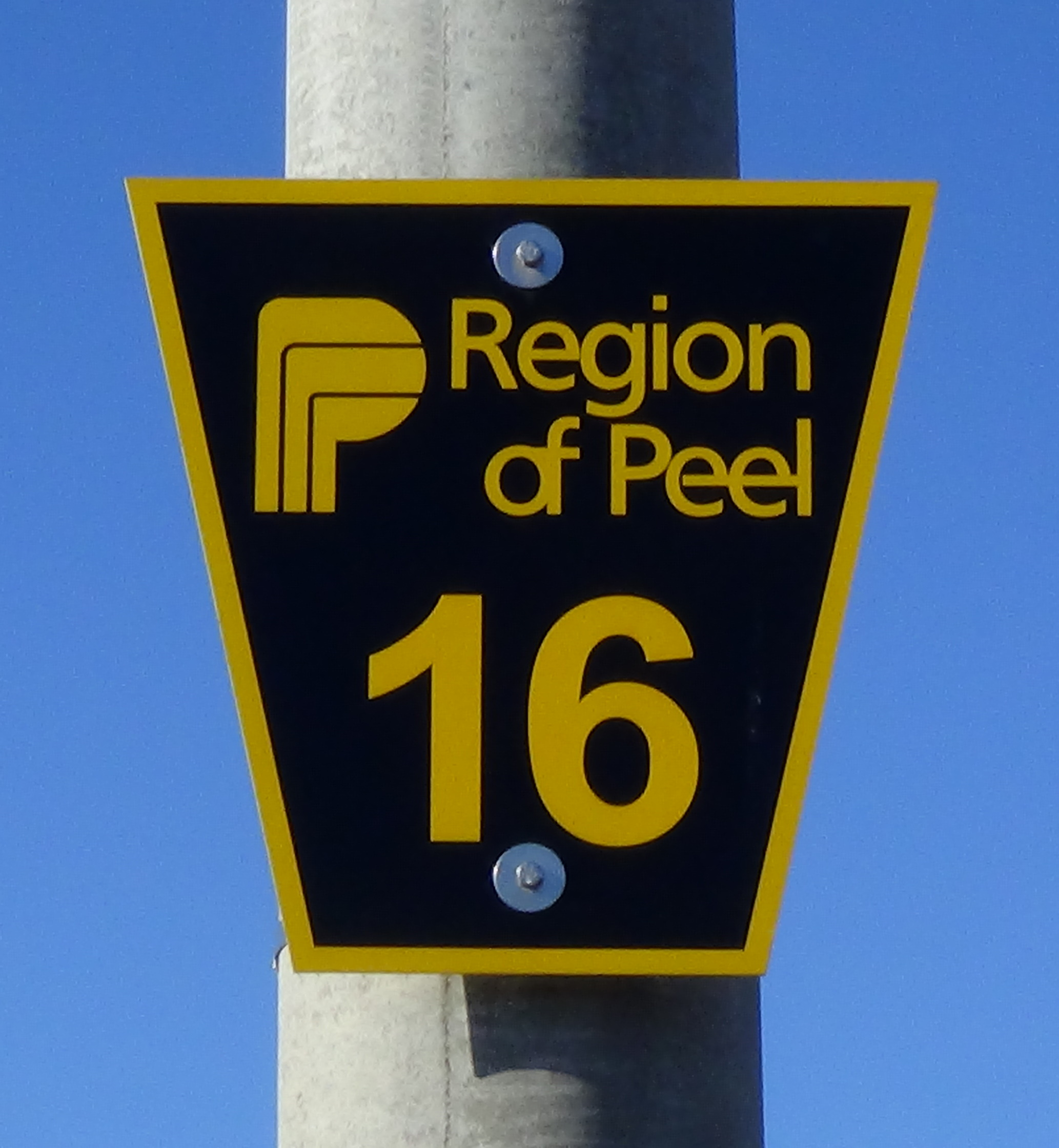
Some arterial roads in Brampton are maintained by Peel Region and are numbered: A Peel Regional Road 16 sign on Kennedy Road

The following is a list of non-numbered and numbered (Peel Regional Roads) in Brampton, Ontario.

== History and layout ==
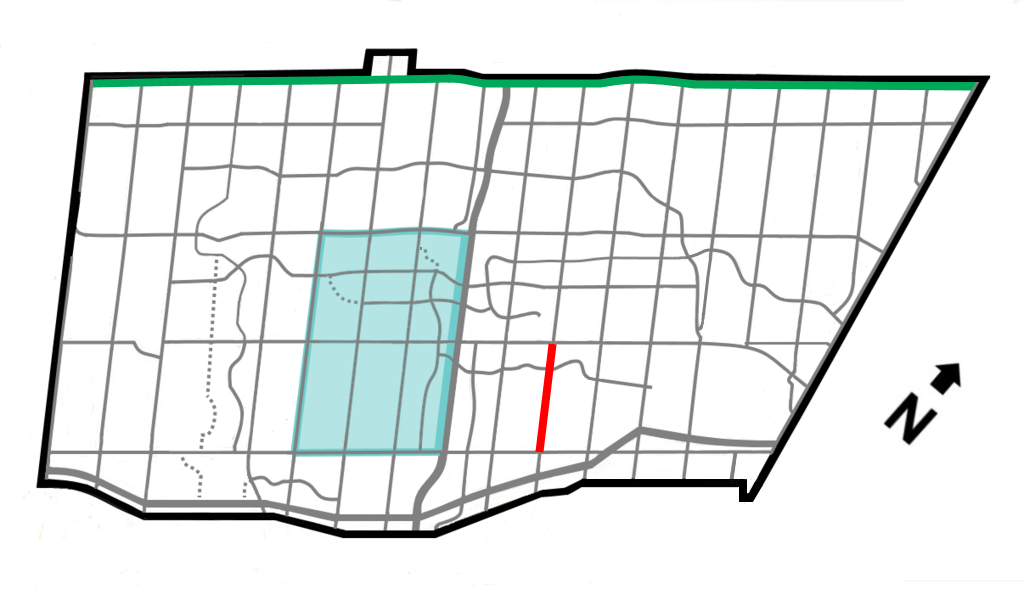
Map of major roads in Brampton, with the area highlighted in blue being the area where a quadrant system is used for dividing streets. The section of Bramalea Road with its distinct numbering section is highlighted in red; and Mayfield Road, which is not divided into east-west sections, is highlighted in green.

Most major roads in Brampton are concession roads laid out in the early 19th Century, in what was then Chinguacousy and Toronto Gore Townships. In Chinguacousy, east–west roads were historically called either concessions or sideroads, while north–south roads were called lines. North–south roads were surveyed from Hurontario Street (which includes present-day Main Street) as the meridian. Toronto Gore Township used a different naming convention, with the concession road designation being used for north–south roads as well. The grid is rectangular, with the historic north–south roads spaced at 3 km (1.9 mile) intervals, and east–west roads at 1.4 km (0.85 mile) intervals. Most of the original major north–south roads run fully through the city and continue into Mississauga and Caledon, with a few exceptions, mainly in the east end, where three either spur off (or formerly did) from Peel Road 50 (formerly Highway 50) which runs slightly offset from the grid and forms the eastern boundary of the city, or are truncated at the Claireville Conservation Area.

=== Designation and address numbering system ===
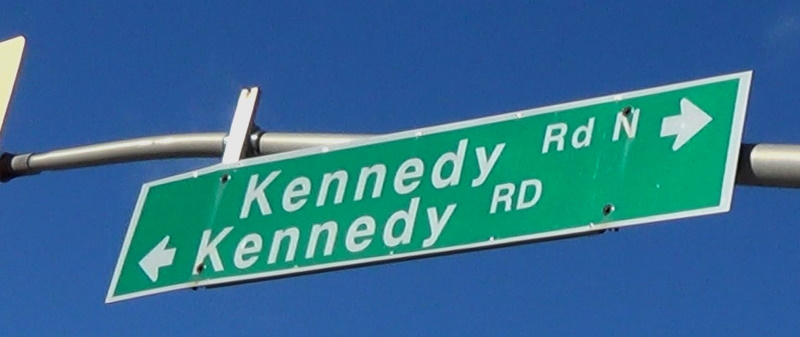
Kennedy Road street sign at Bovaird Drive at the northern end of the quadrant system. The "North" section actually runs south from the intersection.

East–west roads (with the sole exception of Mayfield Road) are designated with "East" and "West" segments on either side of Main and Hurontario Streets. The designation of north–south roads into North and South segments by Queen Street (resulting in a localized quadrant system), is more complicated, with the unusual situation in which only the portions of those between McLaughlin Road and Highway 410 are designated as such. To complicate matters further, even for the roads which are divided, the designation only applies between Steeles Avenue and Bovaird Drive: For example, Kennedy Road South only extends to Steeles with its address numbers resetting from a southward increase beginning at Queen, to numbers descending (from about 7999) to follow the numbering sequence starting at the foot of the street at Eglinton Avenue in Mississauga after it crosses Steeles, and becomes simply Kennedy Road. Likewise Kennedy Road North only runs to Bovaird, with the northward numbers jumping into the 10,000s (with the 8000 and 9000 blocks being replaced by the north–south numbering system) as the street again reverts to just being Kennedy Road This is a legacy of the city's original numbering plan prior to it being enlarged after being amalgamated with the surrounding townships in 1974.

An anomaly in the numbering system outside the north–south numbering area is Bramalea Road, which also has numbers ascending from Mississauga south of Steeles, but resetting to "1" north of it to Queen Street, where the numbers return to the standard sequence in the 9000s.

== East–west roads ==
=== South of Queen ===
==== Steeles Avenue ====
Steeles Avenue
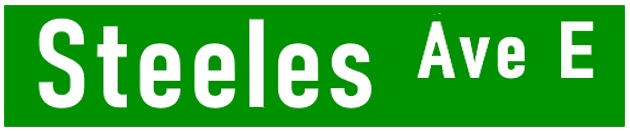
- Location: Winston Churchill Blvd – Highway 50 (continues west into Milton; east into Vaughan.)

Steeles Avenue is the southernmost arterial in Brampton and runs across the entire city, and is designated as Peel Road 15. It begins in Milton in the west and continues to Vaughan and Toronto in the east, where it forms the boundary of Toronto and York Region. Historically, it was also the southern boundary of the Town of Brampton and the Townships of Chinguacousy and Toronto Gore, and the northern boundary of Toronto Township (later the Town of Mississauga between 1968 and 1974) until the municipal restructuring of 1974 brought it fully within Brampton when the new city limits were set to the south at the-then future Highway 407 corridor and the Canadian National Halton Subdivision. This resulted in the community of Churchville becoming part of Brampton. Before 1967, it was known as the Upper Base Line

==== Clark Boulevard ====
Clark Boulevard
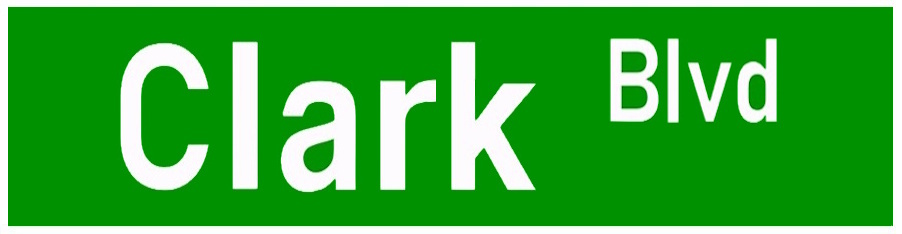
- Location: West Dr. – Torbram Rd. (Brampton Intermodal Terminal)

Clark Boulevard is a sinuous road that runs east from Rutherford Road and continues east to Airport Road, where it ends at the entrance to Canadian National's Brampton Intermodal Terminal. As of 2021, there are plans to extend the street west to Kennedy Road by incorporating a section of Eastern Avenue.

==== Embleton Road ====
Embleton Road
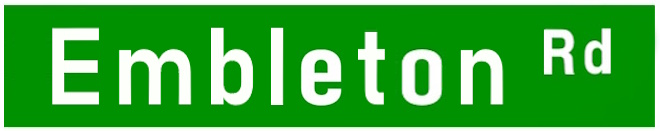
- Location: Winston Churchill Blvd. – Mississauga Rd. (continues west as 5th Sideroad in Halton Hills)

Embleton Road is a short and still-rural two-lane road running east from Winston Churchill Boulevard as a continuation of Fifth Sideroad in Halton Hills, and ends at the Credit River at Mississauga Road in the historic community of Huttonville. It, as well as most of Queen Street and Ebenezer Road in the extreme east of the city, which continues its concession road baseline, were also part of the Fifth Sideroad.

==== Queen Street ====
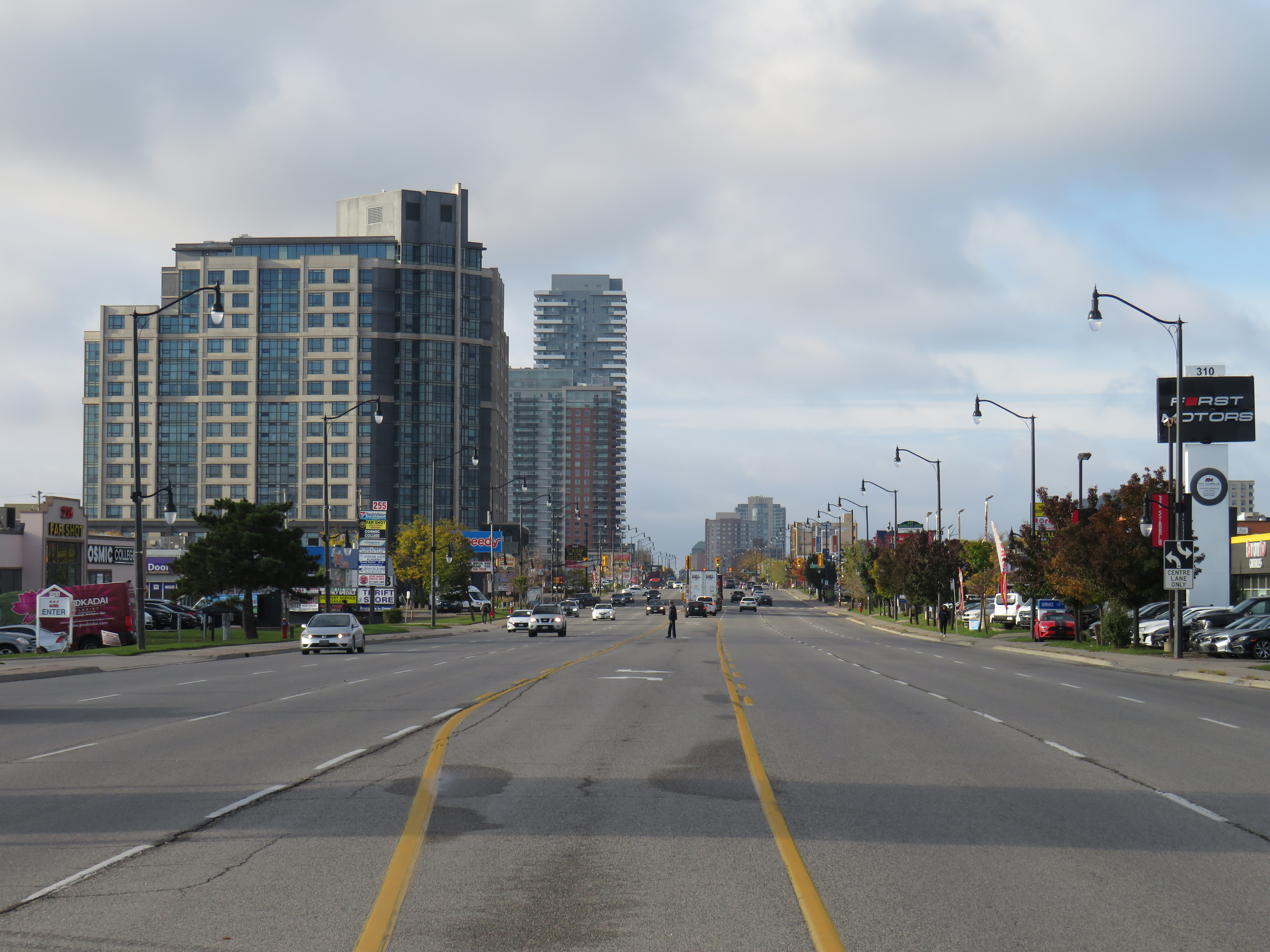
Queen St. west of Highway 410

Queen Street
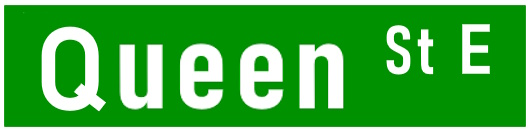
- Location: Mississauga Rd. – Highway 50 (continues east as York Regional Road 7)

Queen Street runs from Mississauga Road east to Peel Regional Road 50 (former Highway 50) and is Brampton's main east–west street with the city's downtown being located at its intersection with Main Street. The street was designated as Highway 7 until 1997 from Highway 410 (which Highway 7 ran concurrently with between Queen and Bovaird Drive, which it followed west of the 410) easterly. Prior to the numbering of the 410 in 1982, it carried the Highway 7 designation as far west as Main Street (where it ran concurrent with Highway 10) north to Bovaird. After the mass provincial highway downloadings of the late 1990s, the Highway 7 designation along both Queen and Bovaird was replaced with the present Peel Road 107 for continuity, with the westernmost portion of the street later being designated as Peel Road 6 west of McMurchy Avenue. This former status as Highway 7 was a factor in making the street one of Brampton's busiest roads, as its importance as an arterial relative to parallel streets diminishes west of Main Street due to it being truncated at the Credit River.

=== North of Queen ===
==== Williams Parkway ====
Williams Parkway
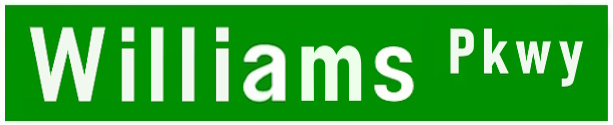
- Location: Mississauga Rd. – Humberwest Pkwy.

Williams Parkway is a modern road built in stages beginning in 1970s, beginning in Bramalea and was extended in stages over the next several decades west to Mississauga Road. It was slated be widened to six lanes between North Park Drive and McLaughlin Road in 2020, but the project was shelved after the David Suzuki Foundation, a prominent Canadian environmental group, lobbied for its cancellation, although construction of replacement noise walls and tree-clearing for the road widening were already completed.

==== Cottrelle Boulevard ====
Cottrelle Boulevard.
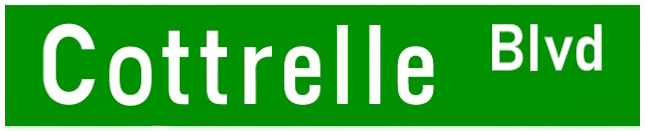
- Location: Goreway Dr. – Highway 50 (Continues west as North Park Drive; east as Langstaff Rd. (York Road 71) into Vaughan)

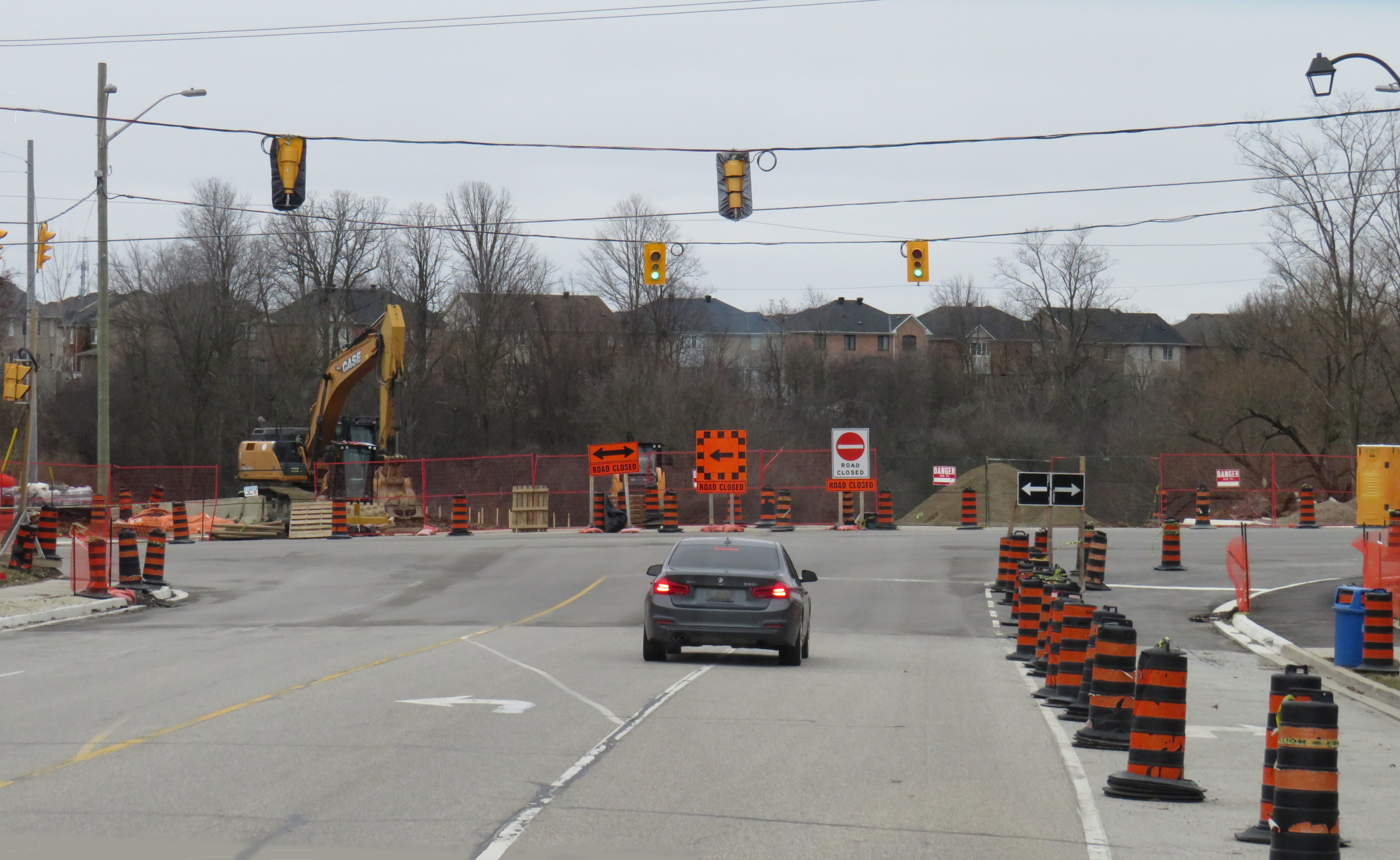
Construction of the Cottrelle Blvd. bridge over the Humber River in 2024

Cottrelle Boulevard is a modern road constructed in the 1990s and runs from Airport Road east to Highway 50 (with a break at the Humber River, where it continues into Vaughan as Langstaff Road (York Regional Road 71). As of March 2024, two bridges to cross the river valley are under construction to join the two sections, after several years of delays due to opposition by environmentalists, who successfully stopped an earlier plan to bridge Williams Parkway (which most of Cottrelle east of the river was originally intended to be an extension of) further south.

==== Bovaird Drive ====
Bovaird Drive
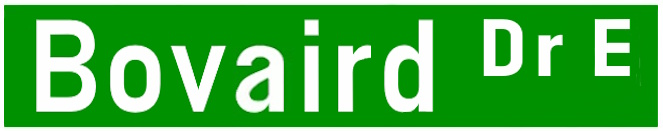
- Location: West city limits – Airport Rd. (continues west as Highway 7 (Guelph St.) into Halton Hills; east as Castlemore Rd.)

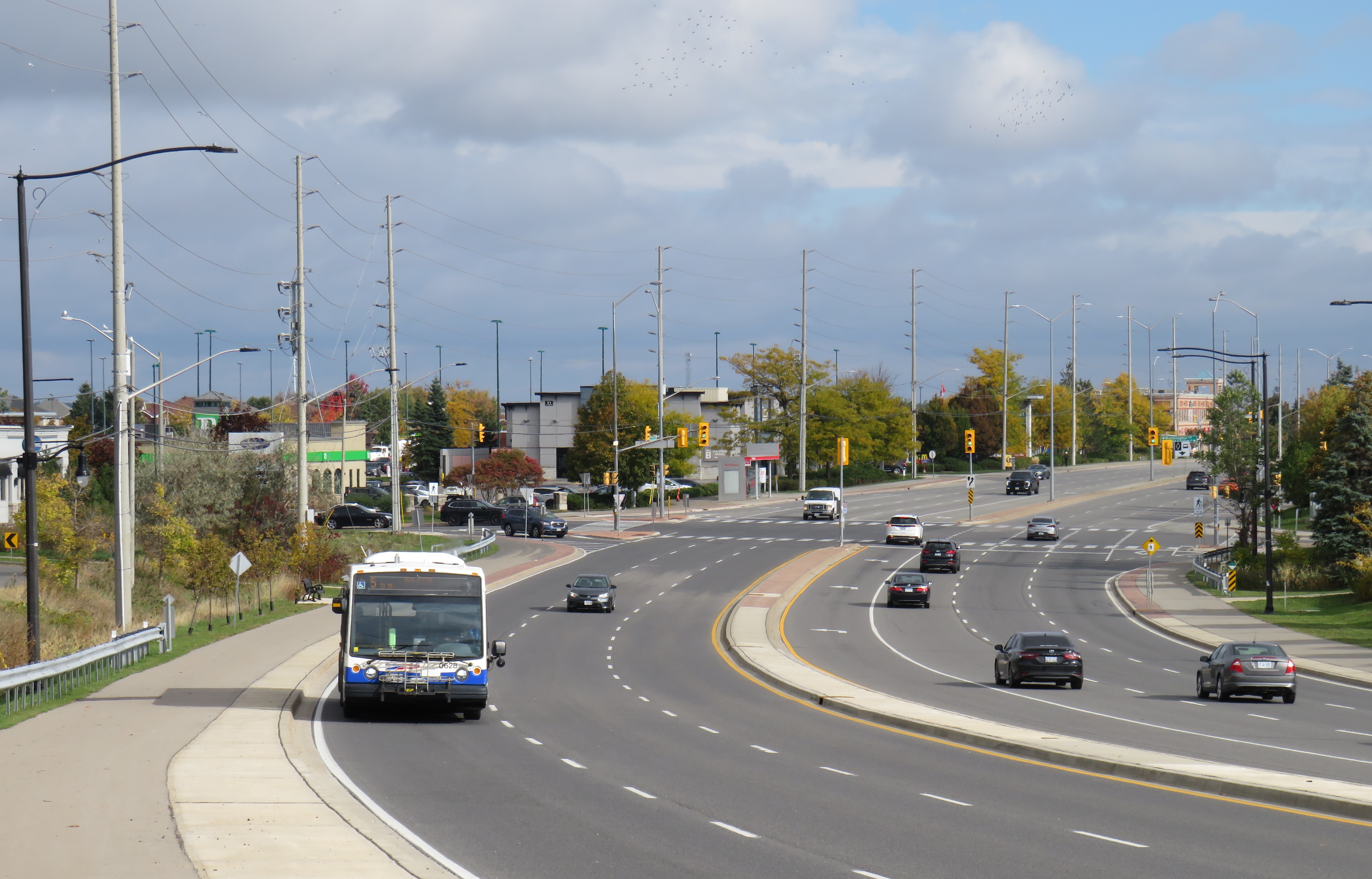
Bovaird Drive near Mount Pleasant GO station

Bovaird Drive runs from the western city limits (at the location where Winston Churchill Boulevard diverts west of the boundary near Norval), where it continues from Highway 7 (Guelph Street) coming from Georgetown (an unincorporated town within Halton Hills), east to Airport Road, where it continues as Castlemore Road. Bovaird, along with Queen Street, was once designated as Highway 7, following Main Street and later Highway 410 to Queen Street before being downloaded and redesignated as regional roads (with the non-highway section of Bovaird being numbered as Peel Road 10) as described in the section of the latter street. Before the downloading the road only bore the name east of Main and Hurontario Streets (with the portion to the west simply being Highway 7), and thus was not divided into east–west sections.

Bovaird is still only two lanes wide as it runs through the still-rural west end of the city, widens to four lanes at Mississauga Road, then expands again to six east of the overpass over the CN Halton Subdivision until Airport Road

==== Castlemore Road ====
Castlemore Road
- Location: Airport Rd. – Highway 50 (continues west as Bovaird Drive; east as Rutherford Rd. (York Road 73))

Castlemore Road is the eastern continuation of Bovaird Drive, through what was originally Toronto Gore Township. It is named after the former rural hamlet of Castlemore. East of Highway 50, it continues into Vaughan as Rutherford Road—not to be confused with the Rutherford Road in Brampton—(York Regional Road 73). As Castlemore and Rutherford Roads did not originally line up at Highway 50, a new alignment of Castlemore was constructed to make the tie-in, with the bypassed section being renamed Old Castlemore Road.

==== Sandalwood Parkway ====
Sandalwood Parkway
- Location: Mississauga Rd. – Airport Rd. (continues south as Humberwest Pkwy.)

Sandalwood Parkway runs from Mississauga Road east to Airport Road. It was built in phases beginning in the late 1970s to serve the then-new Heart Lake neighbourhood. Originally only consisting of a short section between Hurontario Street and Heart Lake Road, it was extended west of Hurontario in the mid-1980s, and a second, separate section was constructed between Dixie and Bramalea Roads in the early 1990s during construction of the Springdale neighbourhood, with the gap between Dixie and Heart Lake Roads being closed when a new overpass opened for traffic in November 2004, concurrent with the extension of Highway 410 (then under construction), with the final sections being completed later that decade. East of Airport Road, it becomes Humberwest Parkway and turns south.

==== Wanless Drive ====
Wanless Drive
- Location: Winston Churchill Blvd. – Hurontario St. (continues east as Conservation Dr.)

Wanless Drive runs east from Winston Churchill Boulevard and runs east to Hurontario Street, where it continues east as Conservation Drive, a minor collector road that ends east of Kennedy Road Both roads are the western half of the original concession road that is broken by the Heart Lake Conservation Area, which resumes east of Heart Lake Road as Countryside Drive (described below). The areas along the street were largely developed during 2010s, and the road is notable for having an unusually large number of stormwater management ponds along much of its length.

==== Countryside Drive ====
Countryside Drive
- Location: Heart Lake Rd. – Highway 50 (continues east as Nashville Rd into Vaughan.)

Countryside Drive is a resumption of the Wanless Drive baseline east of Heart Lake Road, running east to Highway 50. As of 2021, most of the area along the road corridor as far east as The Gore Road are under are either development or recently developed, but remains rural east of there to Highway 50.

==== Mayfield Road ====
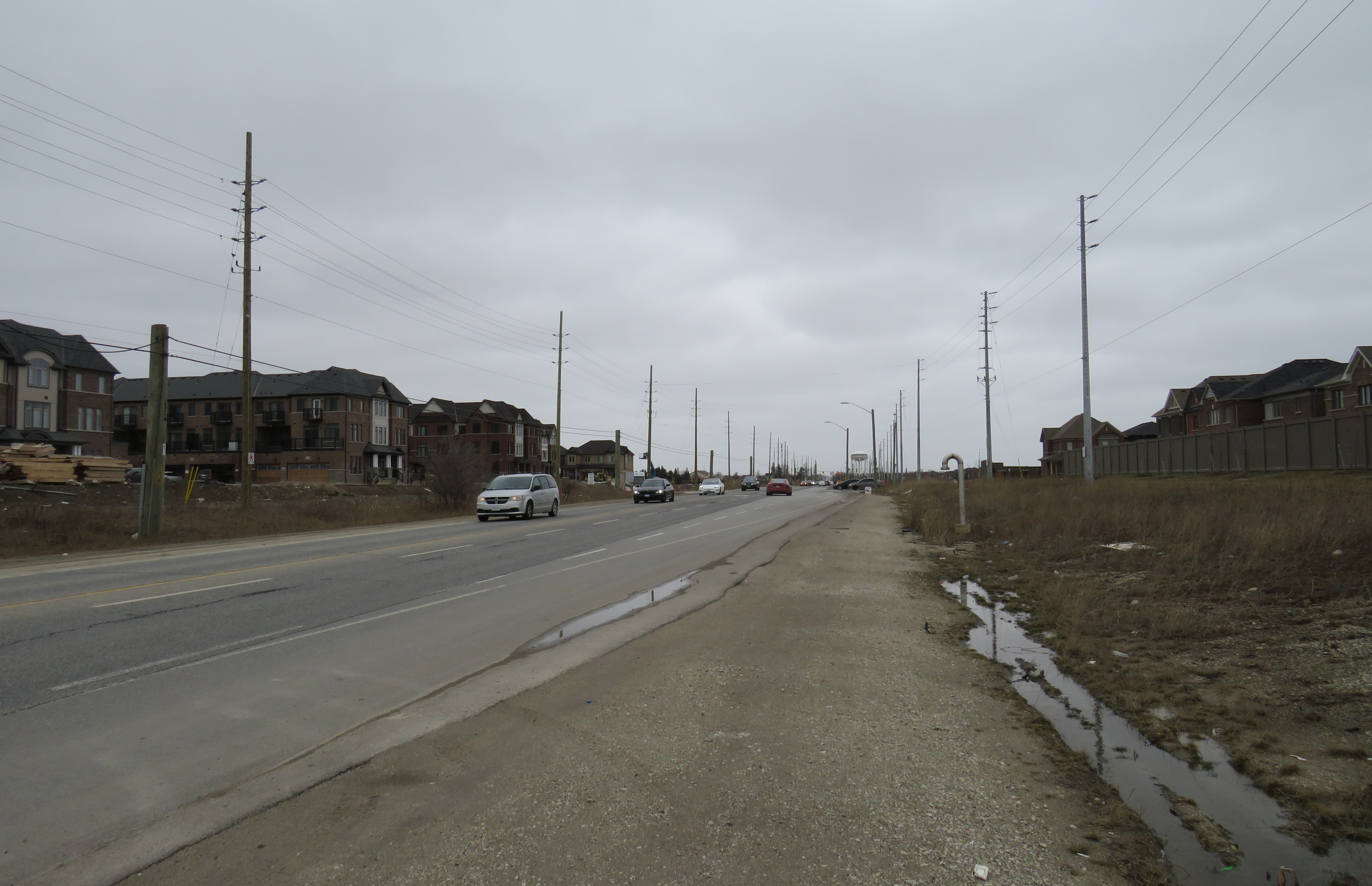
Mayfield Road west of McLaughlin Road, with spillover development occurring in Caledon (left) in 2024

Mayfield Road
- Location: Winston Churchill Blvd. – Highway 50. (continues west as 17th Sideroad into Halton Hills; north as Albion-Vaughan Rd.)

Mayfield Road is designated as Peel Road 14 (and historically the 17th Sideroad, a moniker it still carries to the west in Halton Region) and marks the northern boundary of Brampton across the entire city with the Town of Caledon, except for the area around Hurontario Street, where it shifts north to include the entirety of Snelgrove (originally named Edmonton), which straddles Mayfield, within Brampton. At 21.8 km (13.6 miles) long, it is the longest arterial in the city. Historically, most of Mayfield was not a municipal boundary, but ran through the centre of Chinguacousy Township, though it was the boundary between Toronto Gore and Albion Townships (east of Airport Road) until 1974. Uniquely, the road is not divided into east and west sections, and address numbers follow the Caledon numbering system; starting at the city's western boundary and increasing as it runs eastward. Also, despite both being concession roads, the spacing between Mayfield and the adjacent Wanless/Countryside Drives is only about 1 km (0.6 mile). Rural until the 2000s, the road's corridor is seeing rapid development as residential expansion encroaches from the south, mostly concentrated along the central section; mostly on the Brampton side, but also, to a lesser degree, on the Caledon (north) side.

== North–south roads ==
All roads continue south into Mississauga and/or north into Caledon unless described otherwise.

=== West of Main/Hurontario ===
Winston Churchill Boulevard
- Location: Highway 401 – Mayfield Rd. (continues south into Mississauga; north into Caledon.)

==== Winston Churchill Boulevard ====
Winston Churchill Boulevard is designated as Peel Road 19 and marks the western limits of Brampton (and Peel Region), entering the city near Highway 401. It diverts to the west to run entirely within Halton Hills in the vicinity of Highway 7. Nearly all the areas the road passes through are still rural except for the short section south of Steeles Avenue

==== Heritage Road ====
Heritage Road
- Location: South city limit – Mayfield Rd. (continues south into Mississauga as Meadowvale Blvd; north into Caledon.)

Heritage Road was formerly Fifth Line West, and is a continuation of Mississauga's Meadowvale Boulevard, a diagonal local collector road. Fifth Line originally ran south to the Queen Elizabeth Way in Mississauga; but was reconstructed through it as Erin Mills Parkway to veer east and channel into Mississauga Road south of Highway 401, which resulted in the Brampton section being severed from the Mississauga section. Later, the Brampton section was linked with an extension of Meadowvale Boulevard.

==== Mississauga Road ====
Mississauga Road
- Location: South city limit – Mayfield Rd. (continues south into Mississauga; north into Caledon.)

Mississauga Road is designated as Peel Road 1 and is named after the Mississauga First Nation, as is the adjacent City of Mississauga. It is typically much busier and wider in Brampton (where it is mostly four or six lanes) than most of Mississauga due to the aforementioned Erin Mills Parkway acting as a bypass of it through most of the latter city, where it is mostly only two lanes wide. In Brampton, it is six lanes wide from Highway 407 to north of Sandalwood Parkway (with the exception of a four-lane section south of Queen Street through the former hamlet of Huttonville), but is still only two lanes from there north to Mayfield Road. In early 2026, an overpass over the CN Halton Subdivision opened to traffic, a project that also included widening the artery to six lanes from Bovaird Drive to north of Sandalwood Parkway.

==== Creditview Road ====
Creditview Road
- Location: Dead end south of Steeles Ave. – Mayfield Rd. (with breaks) (continues north into Caledon.)

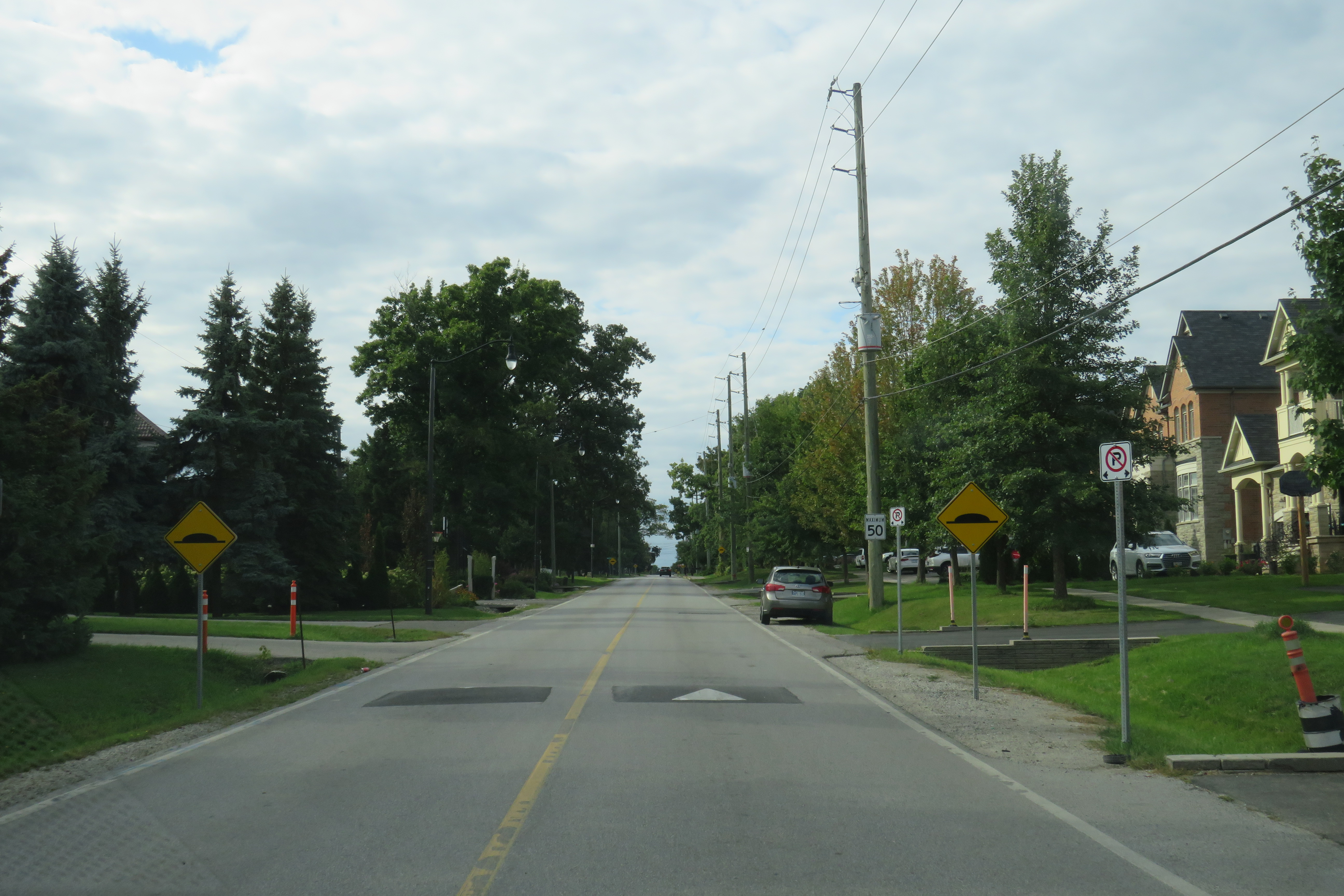
The bypassed southern section of Creditview Rd.

Creditview is a broken road that is named due to it passing through the valley of the Credit River, crossing the river itself several times. To preserve the river valley and the hamlet of Churchville it has been retained as a minor rural road in the southern two-thirds of the city, where it is bypassed by James Potter Road (see below). It begins at a dead end just north of Highway 407 (though it previously continued south into Mississauga – where another section exists – but was severed through the municipal boundary area), passes through Churchville and jogs east at Steeles Avenue and continues north through the river valley. It leaves the valley south of Queen Street and enters an urban area with homes fronting the road, though it still retains its original rural cross-section though much of the area. The bypassed section breaks at Williams Parkway (by curving at 90° to become short frontage streets along it) and ends at James Potter Road. James Potter turns to run north, where it ends at Bovaird Drive. There, Creditview becomes a major arterial as it continues James Potter northward. The first kilometre (0.6 mile) of this section is a realignment of the original road, which is today known as Salvation Road.

The main arterial sections of Creditview in both Brampton and Mississauga are linked via James Potter Road (on the east side of the Credit River), and Financial Drive (on the west side of it) by following Steeles Avenue.

==== James Potter Road ====
James Potter Road
- Location: Steeles Ave. – Bovaird Dr. (continues north as Creditview Rd.)

James Potter Road is a modern-built arterial bypass of Creditview Road between Steeles Avenue and Bovaird Drive, and is located entirely east of the Credit River and is a sinuous street that closely parallels a hydro corridor, crossing it several times. North of its terminus at Bovaird, it continues as the northernmost arterial section of Creditview

==== Mavis Road ====
Mavis Road
- Location: Highway 407 – Steeles Ave. (continues south into Mississauga; north as Chinguacousy Rd.)

Mavis Road is a short road within Brampton, only running between the south city limits near Highway 407 and Steeles Avenue It is designated as Peel Road 18. and is the shortest stretch of designated regional road in Peel, encompassing only the Brampton section of the street, extending neither south along it into Mississauga or further north via Chinguacousy Road. Mavis was built in the late 1990s as a bypass of Chinguacousy (former Second Line, and still designated as such in Mississauga) in both Brampton south of Steeles and Mississauga to avoid the latter city's historic Meadowvale Village.

==== Chinguacousy Road ====
Chinguacousy Road
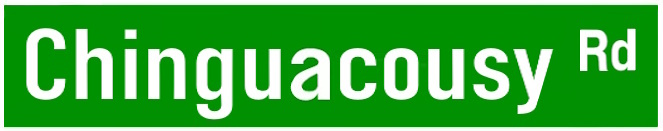
- Location: Dead end south of Steeles Ave. (briefly subsumed into Mavis Rd. south of Steeles) – Mayfield Rd. (continues north into Caledon.)

Chinguacousy Road is a continuation of Mavis Road and runs from Steeles Avenue north into Caledon, with a short bypassed stub south of Ray Lawson Boulevard where Mavis Road curves in from the southeast to tie into the main segment, subsuming a short stretch of the street. As mentioned in the Mavis Road section, it was formerly Second Line West. A short section of the road north of Queen Street formed the boundary between the Town of Brampton and the namesake former Chinguacousy Township between 1960 and the 1974 amalgamation.

==== McLaughlin Road ====
McLaughlin Road
- Location: South city limit – Mayfield Rd. (continues south into Mississauga; north into Caledon.)

McLaughlin Road is the westernmost street in the city with designated north and south sections divided by Queen Street between Steeles Avenue and Bovaird Drive McLaughlin generally runs near Fletcher's Creek, with the creek running directly alongside it for most of the section north of Bovaird. It was the western town limits of Brampton for much of the town's early history.

==== Hurontario Street ====
Hurontario Street
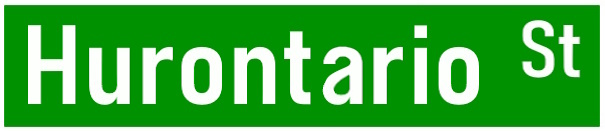
- Location: South city limit – North city limit. (subsumed by Main St. between Steeles Ave. and Bovaird Dr.) (continues south into Mississauga; north into Caledon after merging with Highway 410.)

Hurontario (and Main) Street was formerly Highway 10, and is a historic route running north from Port Credit in present-day Mississauga, through Brampton, and terminating in Collingwood. Its name comes from the two lakes it runs between; Huron and Ontario, and today is subsumed by Main Street between Steeles Avenue and Bovaird Drive. Uniquely, Hurontario does not leave the city when crossing Mayfield Road but continues a short distance north of it to include Snelgrove, north of which it has ramps connecting to Highway 410, which terminates there as it transitions onto northbound Highway 10 (its present southern terminus) to Orangeville.

A light rail transit line, the Hurontario LRT is planned to run along southern section of Hurontario as far as the Brampton Gateway Terminal at Steeles Avenue It is currently under construction and with its opening date currently unknown.

==== Main Street ====
Main Street
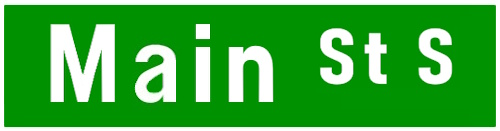
- Location: Steeles Ave. – Bovaird Dr. (continues north and south as Hurontario St. beyond Bovaird and Steeles)

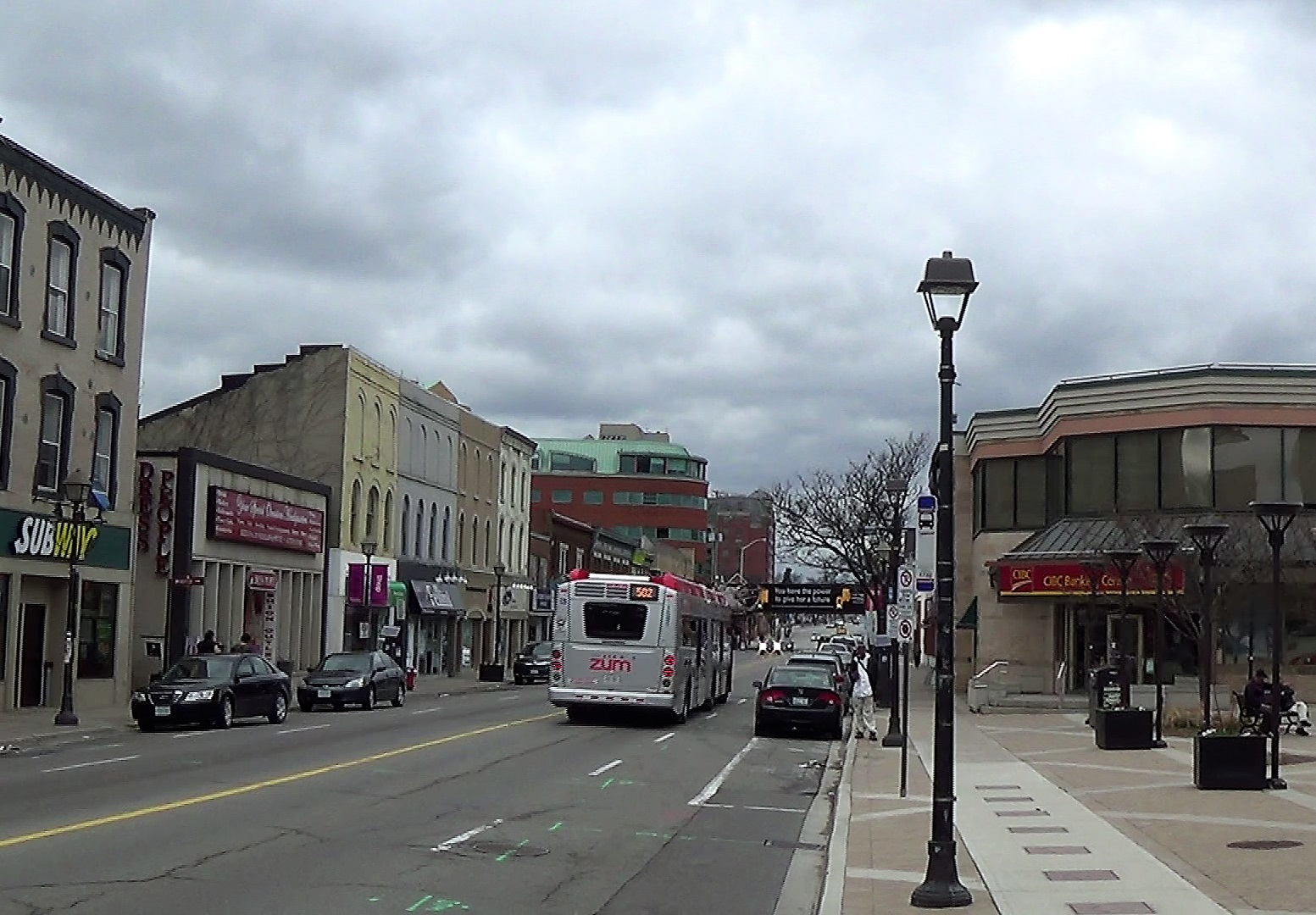
Main Street in downtown Brampton

Main Street is Brampton's primary historic north south street, and originally bore the Hurontario Street name, but was changed after the city's founding. The corner of Main and Queen Streets is the location of downtown Brampton (often referred to as the "Four Corners" due to once having a bank branch on each corner). Attractions along Main include Gage Park and the Rose Theatre. Along with being designated as Highway 10 along its full length, and as mentioned in the Queen Street section, Main also carried the Highway 7 designation between Queen and Bovaird as the latter highway jogged along it between those two roadways. A second phase of the aforementioned Hurontario LRT is proposed to continue up Main to the Brampton GO station.

=== East of Main/Hurontario ===
==== Kennedy Road ====
Kennedy Road
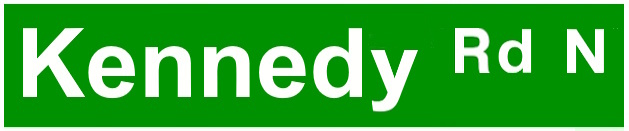
- Location: South city limit — Mayfield Rd. (continues south into Mississauga; north into Caledon.)

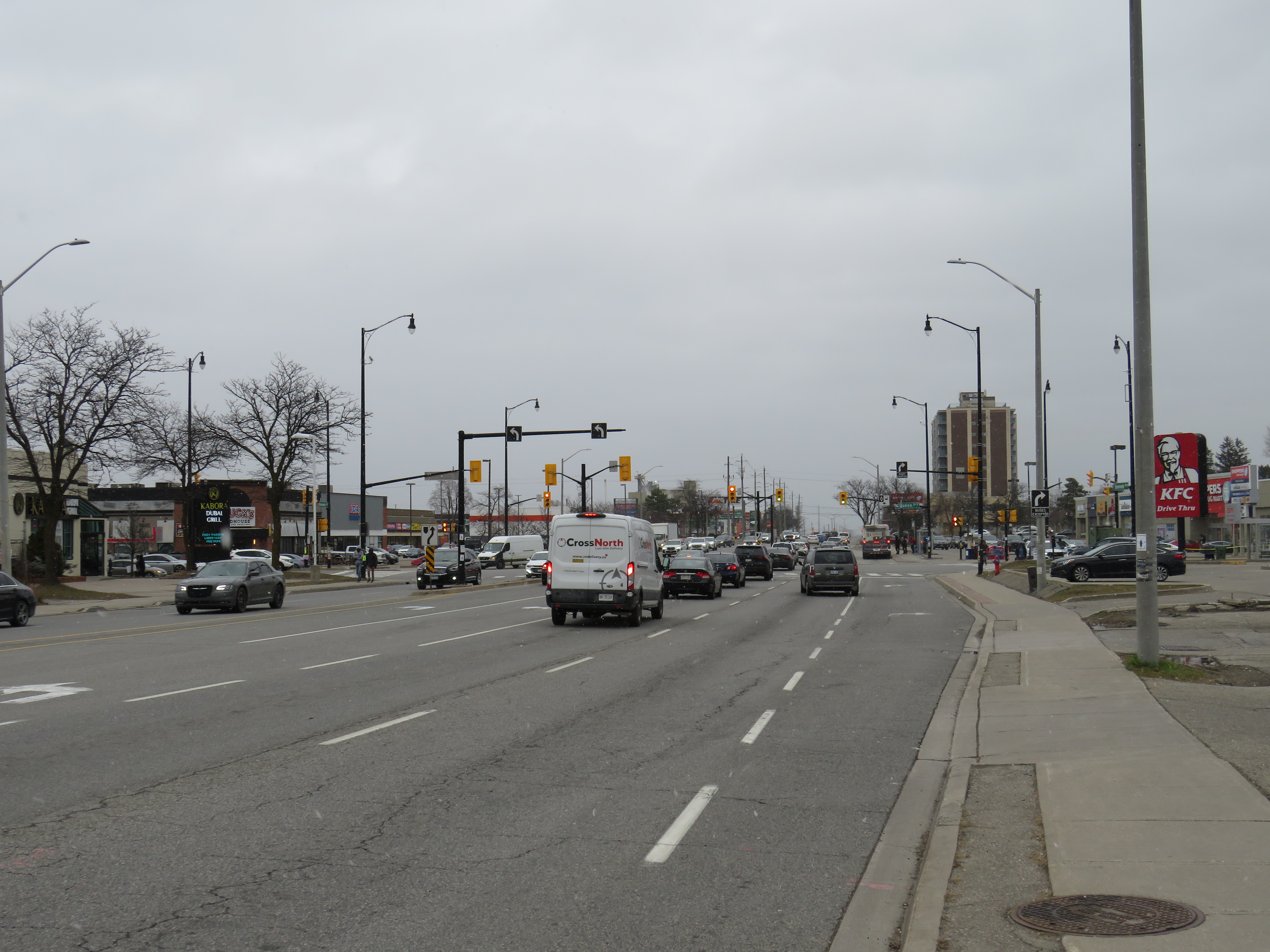
Kennedy Road near the corner of Queen Street

Kennedy Road is named after Thomas Laird Kennedy, a former local MPP and the 15th Premier of Ontario, and is designated as Peel Road 16 between Steeles Avenue and Bovaird Drive (with the portions to the north and south being maintained by the city), with the regionally maintained section mostly corresponding with the street's busiest and most commercialized stretch. The CAA Centre arena is located on Kennedy near the southern city limit by Highway 407, as is the back end of the storage and maintenance facility for the under-construction Hurontario LRT.

Before the 1990s, Kennedy Road served a role as an alternative bypass route for Highway 7, diverting the route out of downtown Brampton, and had a wide curve diverting both directions of traffic traffic straight from Kennedy to Bovaird Drive. This curve was eliminated in the early 80's with road improvements on Bovaird, in favour of highway bypass traffic using Heart Lake Road instead, and the opening of Highway 410 allowed the Highway 7 routing to use the new 410 between Bovaird and Queen.

==== Heart Lake Road ====
Heart Lake Road
- Location: Has three sections: Two short sections located between Steeles Ave. and Queen Street, and a third between Bovaird Dr. and Mayfield Rd. (third section continues north into Caledon)

Heart Lake Road is today a series of discontinuous roads that have been mostly displaced by Highway 410 since the 1980's. It is named after Heart Lake, and runs in three sections: the first between Bramsteele and Selby Roads, the second between Orenda Road and Clark Boulevard (both retained as service roads to maintain access to local buildings predating the adjacent highway's construction), and the third between Bovaird Drive and Mayfield Rd, which continues north into Caledon. Today, only the northernmost section is an arterial road, with the 410 bypassing it to the east since September 2007 (avoiding the Heart Lake Conservation Area, which is accessed directly by Heart Lake Road). Originally, Heart Lake was a single road that continued south to Steeles and beyond into Mississauga, but the section in that city was renamed Tomken Road after being severed from the Brampton section, with a new extension (see below) being constructed to the east to connect to Steeles. This left a fourth bypassed section of Heart Lake, which was renamed Westcreek Boulevard.

==== Tomken Road ====
Tomken Road
- Location: South city limit — Steeles Ave. (continues north as West Drive; south into Mississauga)

Tomken Road, like Kennedy Road, is named for Thomas Laird Kennedy, with "Tomken" as a portmanteau of Thomas and Kennedy. It is a short arterial within Brampton and continues from Mississauga and ends at Steeles Avenue, where it continues as West Drive. As mentioned above, it is a renaming and bypass of the largely displaced Heart Lake Road in the south end of the city after Heart Lake was severed. The southernmost stretch was originally part of Heart Lake, while the northernmost section is a later-built extension that veers east to tie into West Drive

==== West Drive ====
West Drive
- Location: Steeles Ave. – Queen St. (continues north as Laurelcrest Street; south as Tomken Rd.)

West Drive is a northerly continuation of Tomken Road north of Steeles Avenue and runs north to Queen Street, where it continues north as Laurelcrest Street. It originally had a break at the CN tracks midway between Steeles and Queen.

==== Dixie Road ====
Dixie Road
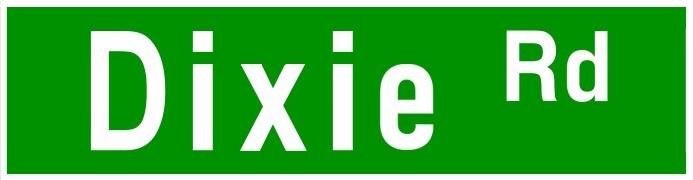
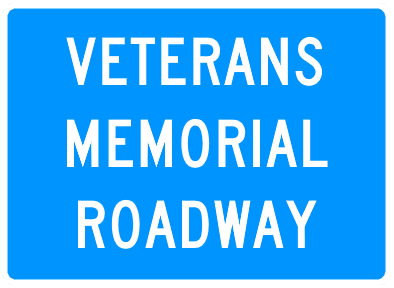
- Location: South city limit — north city limit (continues south into Mississauga; north into Caledon)

Dixie Road is designated Peel Road 4 (and also, as of 2016, Veterans Memorial Roadway), and is the easternmost street in the city to continue south through Mississauga all the way to Lake Ontario due to Peel's eastern boundary narrowing from north to south.

==== Bramalea Road ====
Bramalea Road
- Location: South city limit — Mayfield Rd. (continues south into Mississauga; north into Caledon.)

Bramalea Road is named after the city's Bramalea district; Bramalea is a portmanteau of Brampton, Malton (Malton being a village that is part of Mississauga today), and lea (an old English word meaning meadow or grassland) created by the farmer William Sheard, who owned a large parcel of cattle grazing land that he sold for the new venture—through which it passes. It has its own unique address numbering anomaly with a numbering sequence distinct from both the main grid and north–south systems for the section between Steeles Avenue and Queen Street

==== Torbram Road ====
Torbram Road
- Location: South city limit — Mayfield Rd. (continues south into Mississauga; north into Caledon.)

Torbram Road's name is a portmanteau of Toronto (likely referring to the former Toronto Township) and Bramalea or Brampton.

==== Airport Road ====
Airport Road
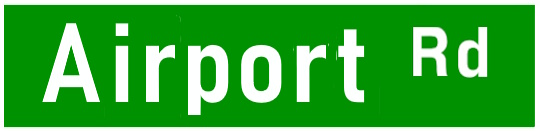
- Location: South city limit — Mayfield Rd. (continues south into Mississauga; north into Caledon.)

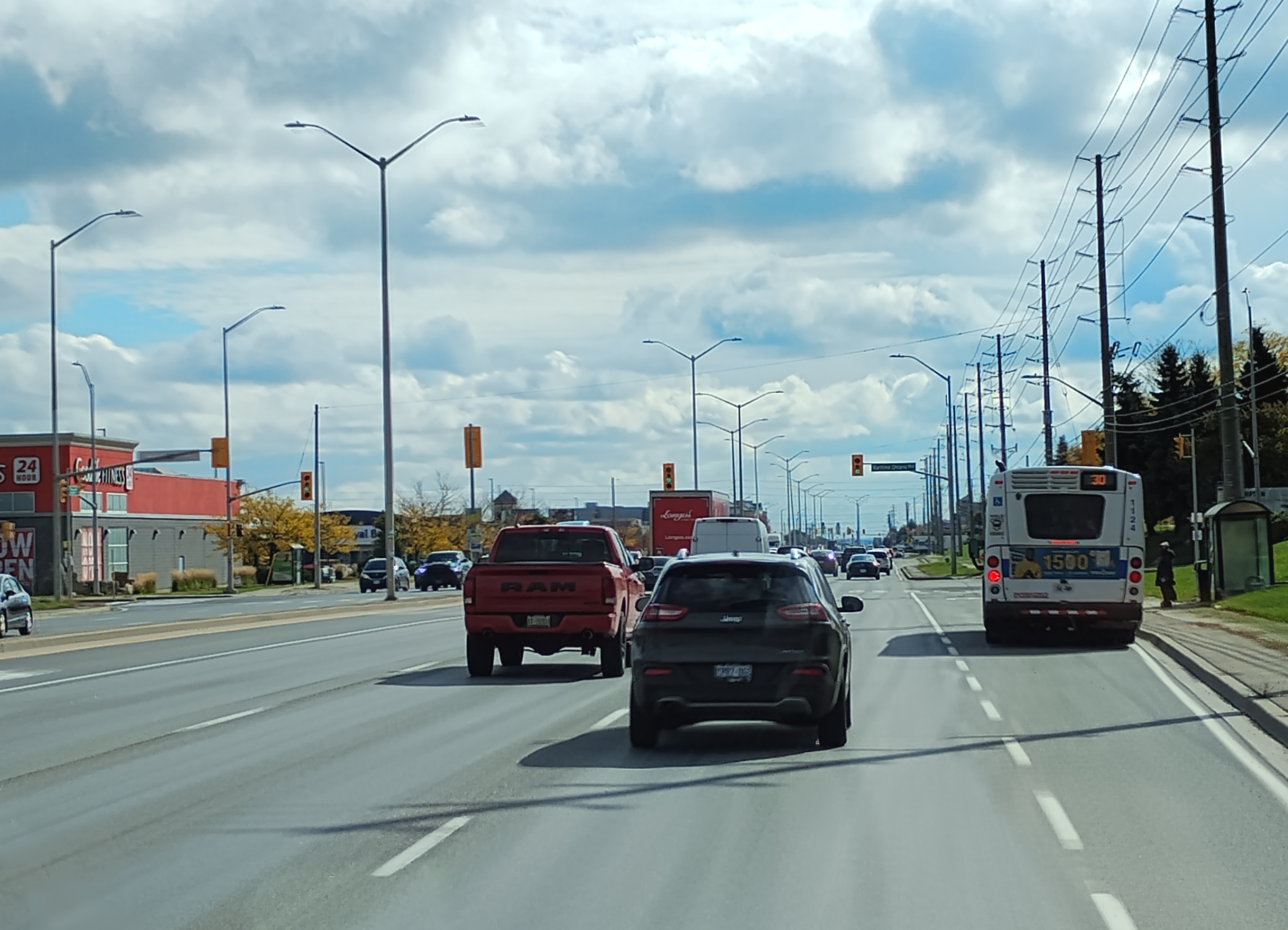
Airport Rd. north of Queen St.

Airport Road is designated as Peel Road 7. It is a very long and busy road beginning at Toronto Pearson International Airport in Mississauga, passing through Brampton, and extending north beyond Peel Region to the boundary of Dufferin and Simcoe counties, where it ends (officially) south of Stayner; a distance of 80 km (50 mi). Before the 1974 amalgamation, it was the boundary between Chinguacousy and Toronto Gore Townships.

==== Humberwest Parkway ====
Humberwest Parkway
- Location: Queen St. – Airport Rd. (continues south as Goreway Dr. (south leg); west as Sandalwood Pkwy.)

Humberwest Parkway runs from Queen Street, opposite the southern leg of Goreway Drive, diagonally northwest to north of Bovaird Drive where it turns west to become Sandalwood Parkway after crossing Airport Road It is named after the west branch of the Humber River which it runs parallel to

==== Goreway Drive ====
Goreway Drive
- Location: South city limit — Mayfield Rd. (continues south into Mississauga; north into Caledon as Innis Lake Rd.)

Goreway Drive is the easternmost road in Brampton to continue into both Mississauga and Caledon, though it changes name to Innis Lake Road in Caledon. A short section just north of Queen Street is subsumed today by the newer Humberwest Parkway, and a right turn is needed to continue northbound. It is named after the former Toronto Gore Township, which is itself named either after Francis Gore, Lieutenant Governor of Upper Canada, or the triangular survey, called a gore, which gave the township its shape. In 2023, construction started on a long-delayed overpass at the CN Halton Subdivision level crossing on the boundary with Mississauga. The bridge opened to traffic in October 2025.

==== Finch Avenue ====
Finch Avenue
- Location: South city limit — Steeles Ave. (continues south into Mississauga)

Finch Avenue is designated Peel Regional Road 2, and runs for only 1 km. (0.6 mi.) south from Steeles Avenue before continuing into Mississauga where it ends at Highway 427 after a similarly short distance, making it the shortest regional road in terms of being applied the entirety of a road within Peel. However, just north of the 427, it curves eastwards to cross into Toronto, where it continues as one of that city's major east–west streets and eventually reaches Pickering.

==== McVean Drive ====
McVean Drive
- Location: Queen St. – Mayfield Rd. (continues north into Caledon as Centreville Creek Rd.)

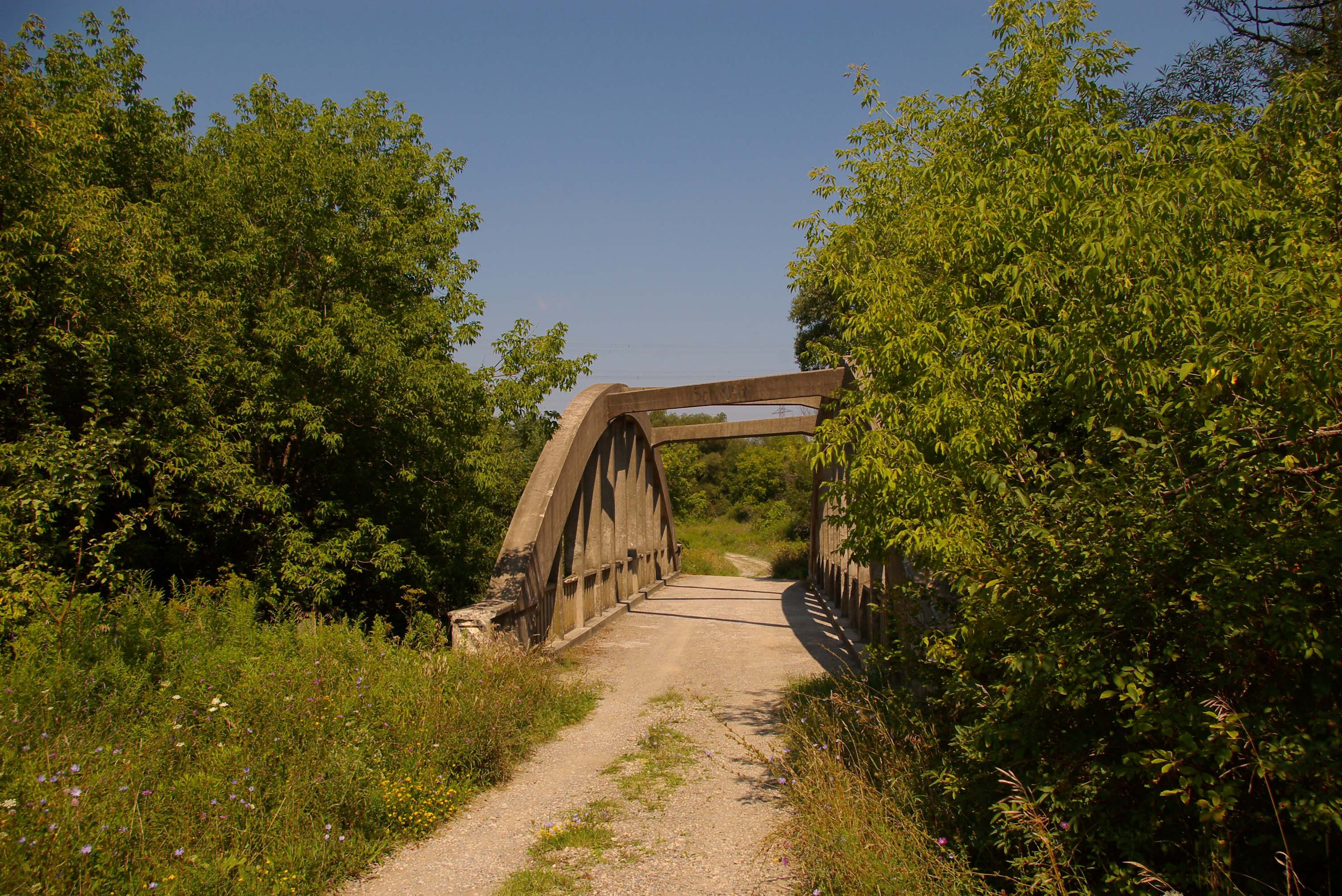
The historic 9th Concession bridge in Claireville Conservation Area

McVean Drive runs north from Queen Street, opposite the north entrance to the Claireville Conservation Area, through which it runs as a pathway, and changes name to Centreville Creek Road after it leaves the city and enters Caledon. It was originally the 9th Concession and ran south through the present conservation area (where the historic bowstring bridge that carried it across the west branch of the Humber River remains in use for a trail), and continued south via Gorewood Drive to Steeles Avenue and beyond along the present course of Finch Avenue.

==== The Gore Road ====
The Gore Road
- Location: Highway 50 – Mayfield Rd. (continues north into Caledon)

The Gore Road spurs northwest off Highway 50 between Steeles Avenue and Queen Street and is designated as Peel Road 8. It passes through the Ebenezer (originally a rural hamlet) and Claireville neighbourhoods. Like Goreway Drive, it is named after Toronto Gore Township.

==== Clarkway Drive ====
Clarkway Drive
- Location: Cottrelle Blvd. – Mayfield Rd. (continues north into Caledon as Humber Station Rd.)

Clarkway Drive runs north of Cottrelle Blvd opposite Via Romano Way and the area it passes through is still rural north of Castlemore Road. The southernmost section has been realigned through the Ebenezer area, but the original section still branches off Highway 50 as a stub east of the new alignment, and still bears the name, giving the road two parallel segments. It becomes Humber Station Road in Caledon.

==== Coleraine Drive ====
Coleraine Drive
- Location: Highway 50 – Mayfield Rd. (continues east as Major Mackenzie Dr. (York Road 25); north into Caledon)

Coleraine Drive is designated Peel Road 150 and spurs off Highway 50, where it turns east to continue as Major Mackenzie Drive (York Road 25) into Vaughan, and runs north to Mayfield Road where it continues north into the west end of Bolton, a large community within Caledon. It still runs through a wholly rural area in the extreme northeast corner of Brampton.

==== Highway 50 ====
Highway 50
- Location: Steeles Ave. – Mayfield Rd. (continues south into Toronto as Albion Road; north into Caledon (Bolton))

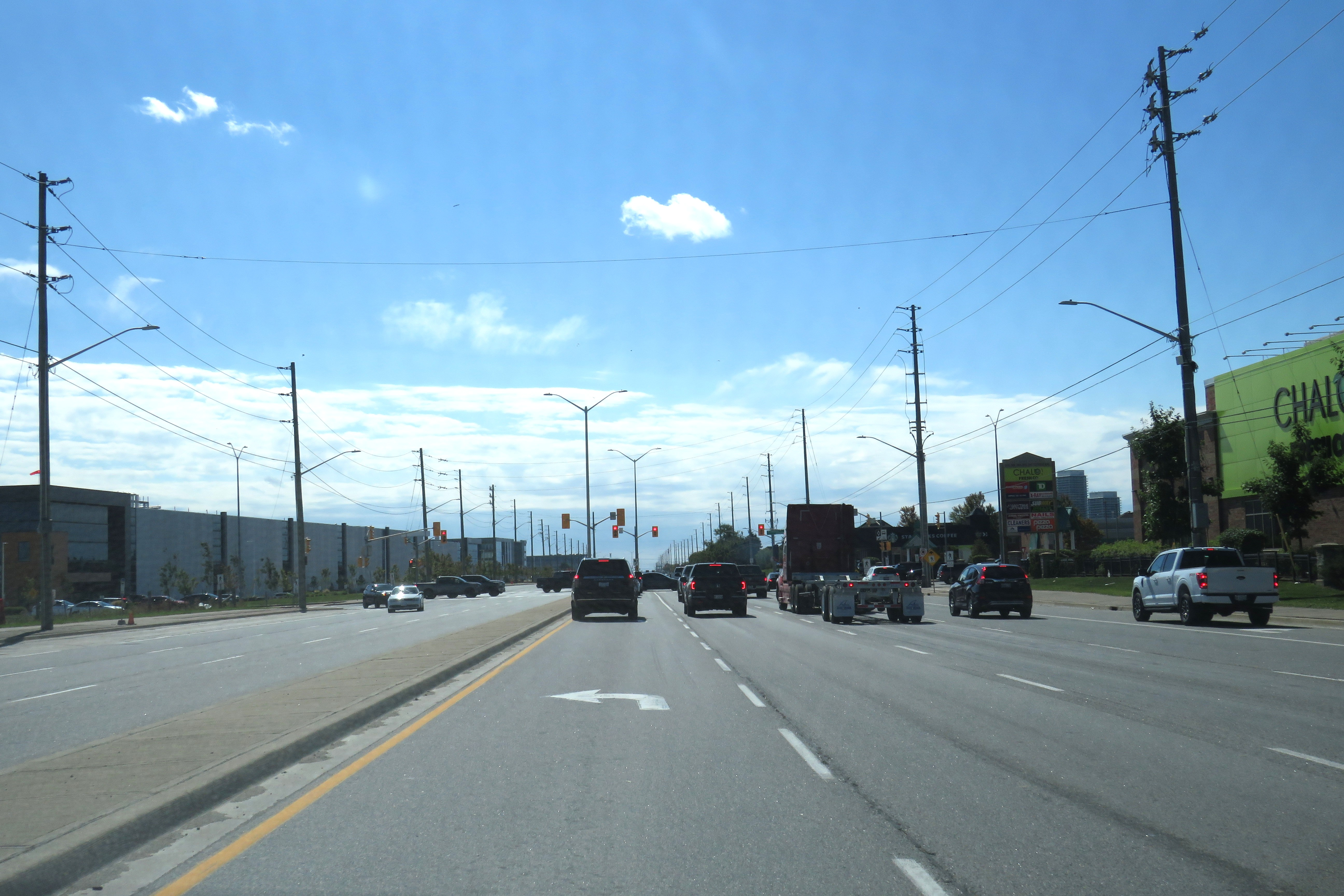
Highway 50 north of Cottrelle Blvd. with the City of Vaughan on the east (left) side

Highway 50 runs north from Steeles Ave, where it continues south as Albion Road into Toronto (at the only location where Brampton and Toronto meet), and continues into Caledon as the main artery of Bolton. It is a very busy and mostly six-lane road, and is the easternmost road in Brampton. It marks the eastern boundary of both the city and the region, with Vaughan, and York Region, located on the eastern side. Despite its name, it is no longer a provincial highway and is now officially maintained by the Region as Peel Regional Road 50. The former highway continued south along Albion Road as far as Highway 27, and ended at Highway 89 west of Alliston.

== Collector roads ==
=== Ebenezer Road ===
Ebenezer Road
- Location: West of McVean Dr. – Highway 50

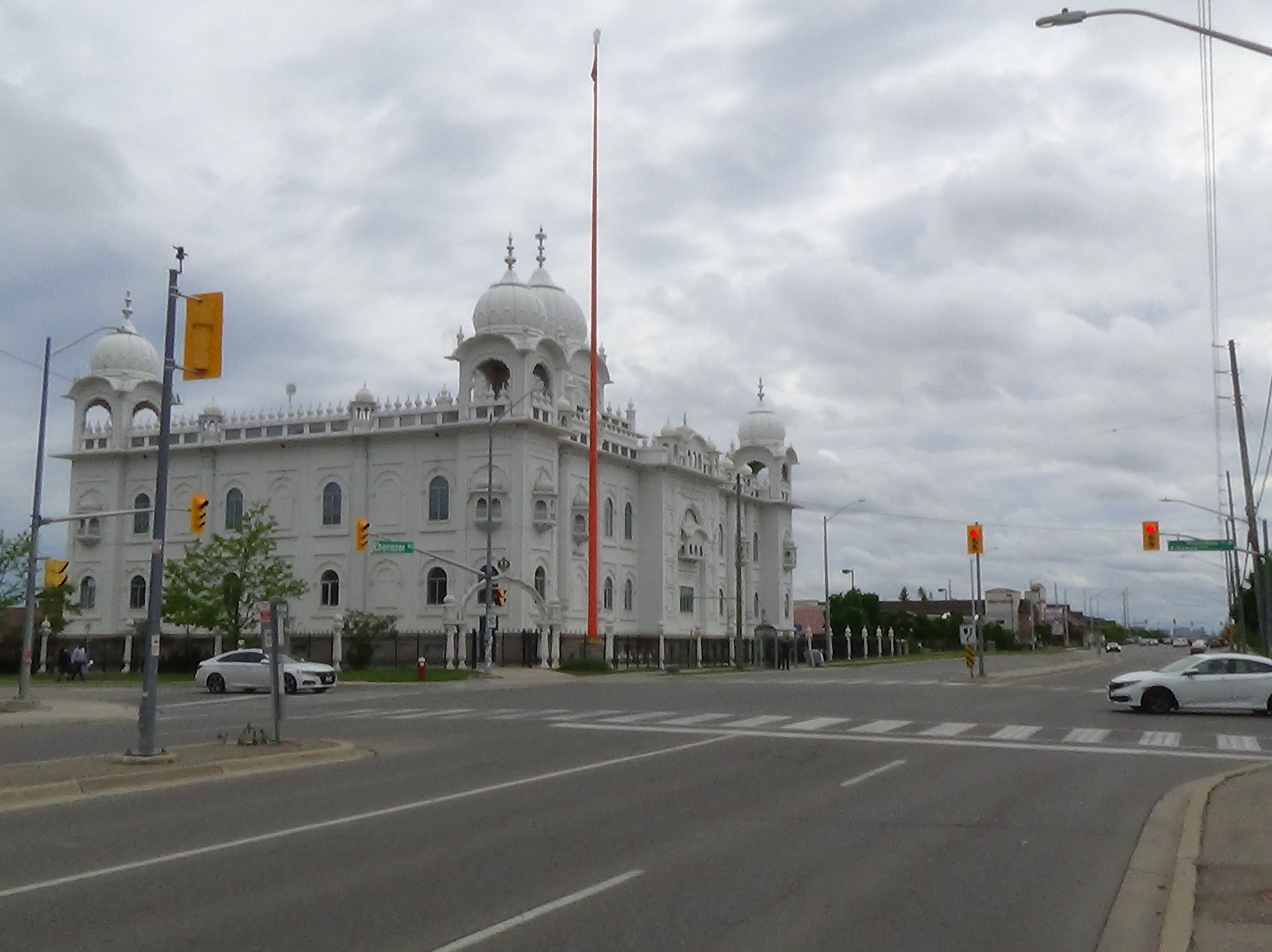
The Gurdwara Dasmesh Darbar Ontario Sikh Temple is located on Ebenezer Road

Ebenezer Road begins as a stub west of McVean Drive just north of Queen Street and ends at Highway 50. It continues the straight course of Queen after the street curves to tie into York Road 7 (Highway 7), and was the original route of the former highway (and was also part of the afformentioned earlier Fifth Sideroad) when it jogged at Highway 50. A Sikh temple, the Gurdwara Dasmesh Darbar Ontario Sikh Temple, is located on the street at the corner of Nexus Avenue.

=== Financial Drive ===
Financial Drive
- Location: South city limit – Heritage Rd. (continues south into Mississauga)

Financial Drive runs north from Mississauga west of the Credit River and turns west where it crosses Mississauga Road to end at Heritage Road. It functions as the main link between the Brampton and Mississauga sections of Creditview Road

=== Howden Boulevard ===
Howden Boulevard
- Location: Williams Pkwy. – Central Park Dr. (continues north as North Park Dr.)

Howden Boulevard is a short collector street with a C-shaped course, running south as a continuation of North Park Drive at that street's southwestern terminus at Williams Parkway It curves to the east at Vodden Street (as a continuation of its alignment) and ends at Central Park Drive near Chinguacousy Park.

=== North Park Drive ===
North Park Drive
- Location: Williams Pkwy. – Humberwest Pkwy. (continues south as Howden Boulevard; east as Cottrelle Blvd.)

North Park Drive runs north and west of Williams Parkway as a continuation of Howden Boulevard, and runs east to Humberwest Parkway, where it continues as the western section of Cottrelle Boulevard west of the Humber River.

=== Ray Lawson Boulevard ===
Ray Lawson Boulevard
- Location: Mavis Rd. – Hurontario St. (continues south as Chinguacousy Rd. (stub section); east as County Court Blvd.)

Ray Lawson Boulevard is a residential collector street that runs east from Mavis Road as a continuation of the bypassed stub of Chinguacousy Road and ends at Hurontario Street where it continues east as County Court Boulevard.

=== Rutherford Road ===
Rutherford Road
- Location: Steeles Ave. – Kennedy Rd. (turns back south as Centre St. after crossing Kennedy)

Rutherford Road runs from Steeles Avenue west of Highway 410, to north to Williams Pkwy, where it becomes a minor residential street as it turns east to end at Kennedy Road, where it becomes Centre Street and turns south. It is the easternmost street in the city with north–south sections.

=== Vodden Street ===
Vodden Street
- Location: Williams Pkwy. – Howden Blvd. (continues north as Royal Orchard Drive)

Vodden Street runs south from Williams Parkway and becomes a collector street after it turns east and crosses Main Street. It ends at Howden Boulevard.

== Provincially maintained highways ==
There are two 400-series highways running through Brampton:

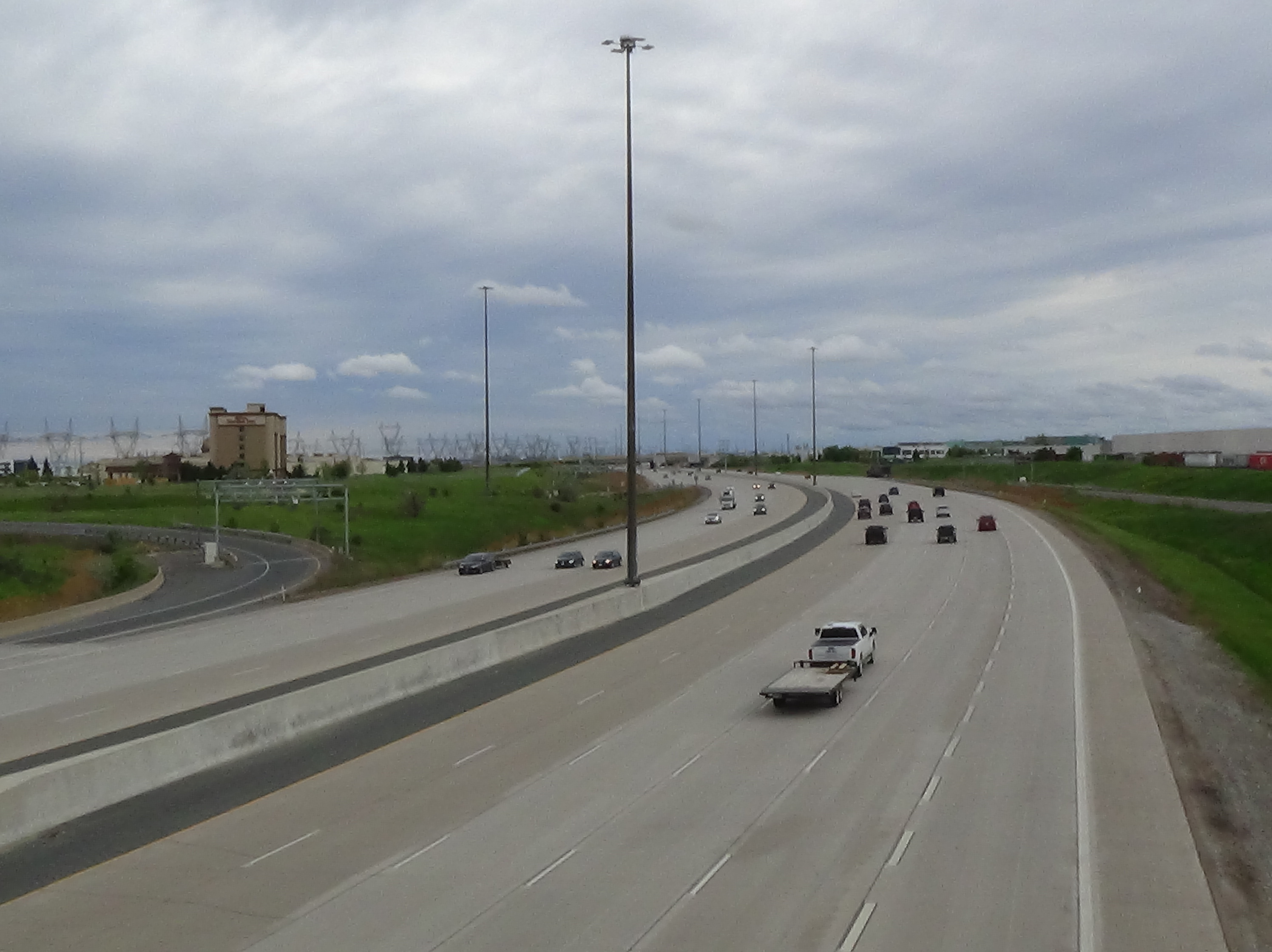
Highway 407 looking west from Airport Road

- Highway 407: A privately maintained toll highway crossing the city just north of its southern limits.
- Highway 410: Runs north–south through the city from Mississauga through to southern Caledon, where it merges with Highway 10.

There is also the planned Highway 413, which would have a north–south section running through the west end of the city.

== See also ==
- List of numbered roads in Peel Region
- List of roads in Mississauga: For description of southward continuations of various north–south roads within that city.
