= Peel County, Ontario =

Former County in Ontario, Canada

Peel County
- Dissolved county
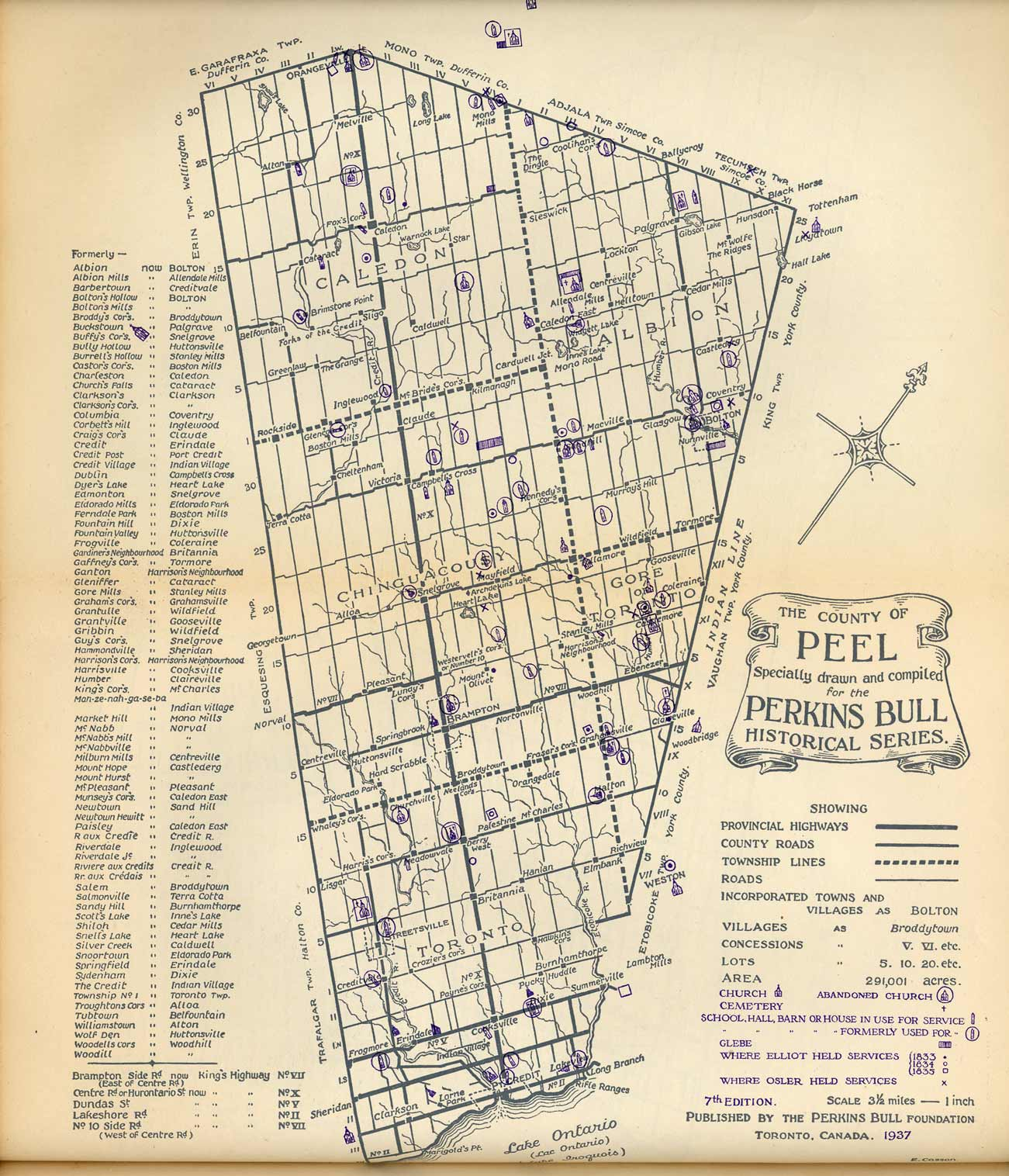
- Interactive map of Peel County
- Coordinates: 43.68491°N 79.75752°W
- Country: Canada
- Ontario: Province
- Established: 1851 (from York County)
- Dissolved: 1974 (into Regional Municipality of Peel)
- Time zone: UTC-5 (Eastern (EST))
  - Summer (DST): UTC-4 (Eastern (EDT))

Peel County is a historic county in the Canadian province of Ontario. Named for Sir Robert Peel, Prime Minister of the United Kingdom, the county was organized in 1851. Settlers, however, were in Toronto Township as early as 1807. The Credit River was reserved for the Mississaugas; however, they sold their land and moved to the Bruce Peninsula.

== Formation and history ==
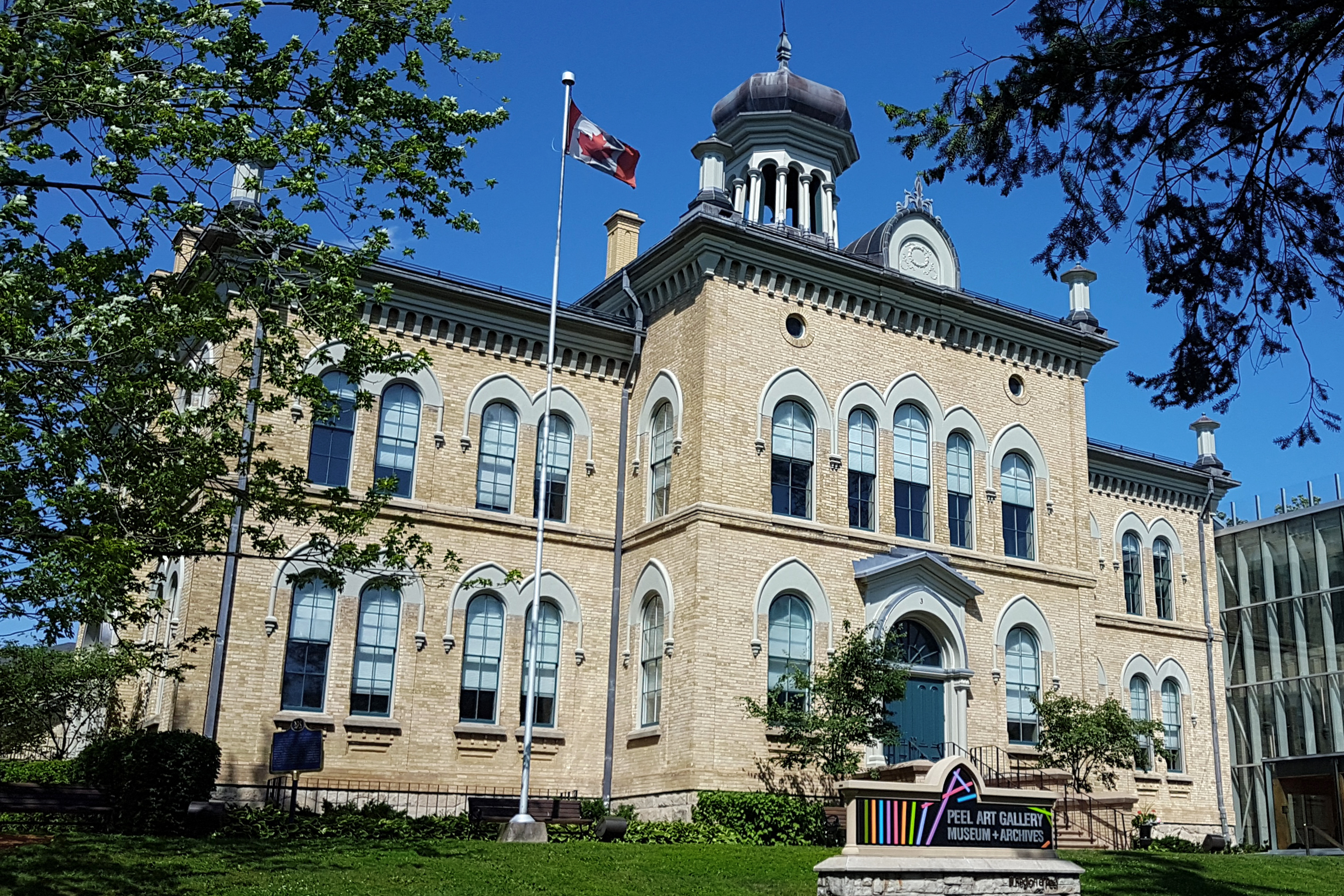
Now an art gallery, the Peel County Courthouse was built in 1865–66

The townships that would eventually constitute Peel were initially part of York County in the Home District, and were designated as the West Riding of York in 1845.

Historic townships of the County of Peel
Township	Opened	Description
Albion	1819	Given the ancient name of England.
Caledon	1819	Named for the historic district of Caledonia, Scotland.
Chinguacousy	1819	Named, probably in honour of a loyal Chippewa chief who fought at the capture of Michilimackinac. His name was Shinguacose, "the small pine." Born to a Scottish officer and Chippewan mother, Shinguacose died around 1858. The name of the township may also be from an indigenous word meaning "the place where young pines grow."
Toronto	1806	Named after the Toronto Purchase. (In 1834, the name was also adopted by the nearby town of York when it became the City of Toronto.)
Toronto Gore	1831	Its name is derived from the Toronto Purchase and from the word "gore", referring to a triangular piece of land.

The following communities were organized:

Historic communities of the County of Peel
Community	Township	Description
Town of Brampton	Chinguacousy	Opened in 1834 when John Elliott laid out the lots and named the place. Incorporated as a village in 1852, and as a town in 1873. Named by settler John Eliot and likely linked to Brampton, Carlisle, Cumbria in England.
Village of Bolton	Albion	James Bolton, the first settler, in partnership with his brother George, built a grist mill in 1824.
Village of Port Credit	Toronto	Named for French trading post Port-de-crédit.
Village of Streetsville	Toronto	John Barnhart opened the first store in 1821 and Timothy Street built a saw and grist mill.
Police Village of Malton	Toronto Gore	It had its beginnings about 1820. Likely named for Malton, North Yorkshire by local settler Richard Halliday.

The county was created in 1851, forming part of the United Counties of York, Ontario and Peel. It was given its own provisional county council in 1856, and was formally separated from York in 1860.

However, disputes as to whether the county seat should be Malton or Brampton prompted the provisional council to request that the separation be reversed, and an 1862 Act of the Parliament of the Province of Canada brought that into effect, reviving the United Counties of York and Peel. In 1866, the counties were re-separated.

In 1973, Peel County became the Regional Municipality of Peel, as a result of the Ontario provincial government's regionalization of the rapidly developing counties surrounding Toronto.

== See also ==
- List of Ontario census divisions
- List of townships in Ontario
