= Toronto Gore =

Coordinates: 43°47′39″N 79°42′37″W

The Emblem of Toronto Gore Township, used until 1974.

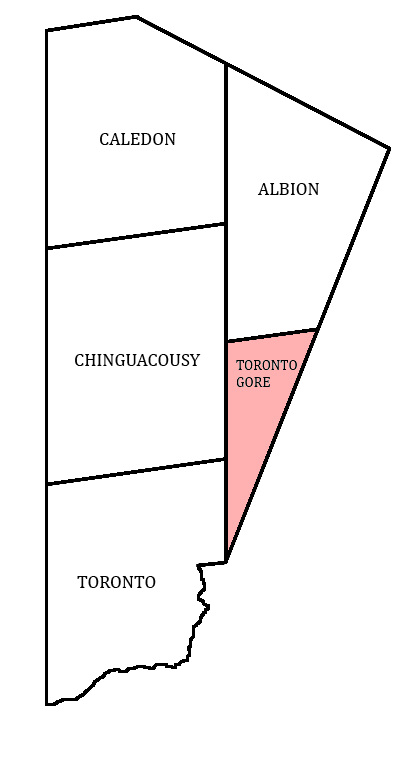
Toronto Gore within Peel County.

Toronto Gore (also the Gore of Toronto) is a former incorporated and now geographic township in Ontario, Canada. It is today split between Mississauga and Brampton.

== History ==
Toronto Gore came into existence as a township in 1819 when it was separated from Chinguacousy Township. In 1867 it became part of Peel County when that county was split from York County. A small wedge-shaped tract of land, Toronto Gore was located in the east of the county, on the border with York County (and later, Region). It was south of Albion Township, east of Chinguacousy Township (the boundaries being located along Castlemore and Airport Roads respectively in present-day Brampton), and northeast of Toronto Township (now Mississauga). In 1952, the southern portion of the township (south of the present Steeles Avenue) was annexed to Toronto Township, and in 1974 the remainder was amalgamated into the City of Brampton.

Several historical villages were once located within Toronto Gore, including Claireville, Ebenezer, Castlemore, Wildfield and Coleraine. However, only small remnants like churches and cemeteries of these former villages exist. Wildfield remains the only community to maintain its unique identity while the rest have been completely overtaken by suburban developments.

The name lives on in the name of two local roads "Goreway Drive" and "The Gore Road", and the Brampton neighbourhood of Gore Meadows.

Toronto-Gore, along with Goreway Drive, might have been named for Sir Francis Gore, Lieutenant Governor of Upper Canada. A more likely derivation is from the shape of the tract or its origin: in surveying, a gore is a triangular piece of land in British usage and a small strip or tract of land lying between larger divisions in US usage.

== See also ==
- List of townships in Ontario
