= Bolton, Ontario =

Community in Ontario, Canada

Bolton
- Unincorporated community
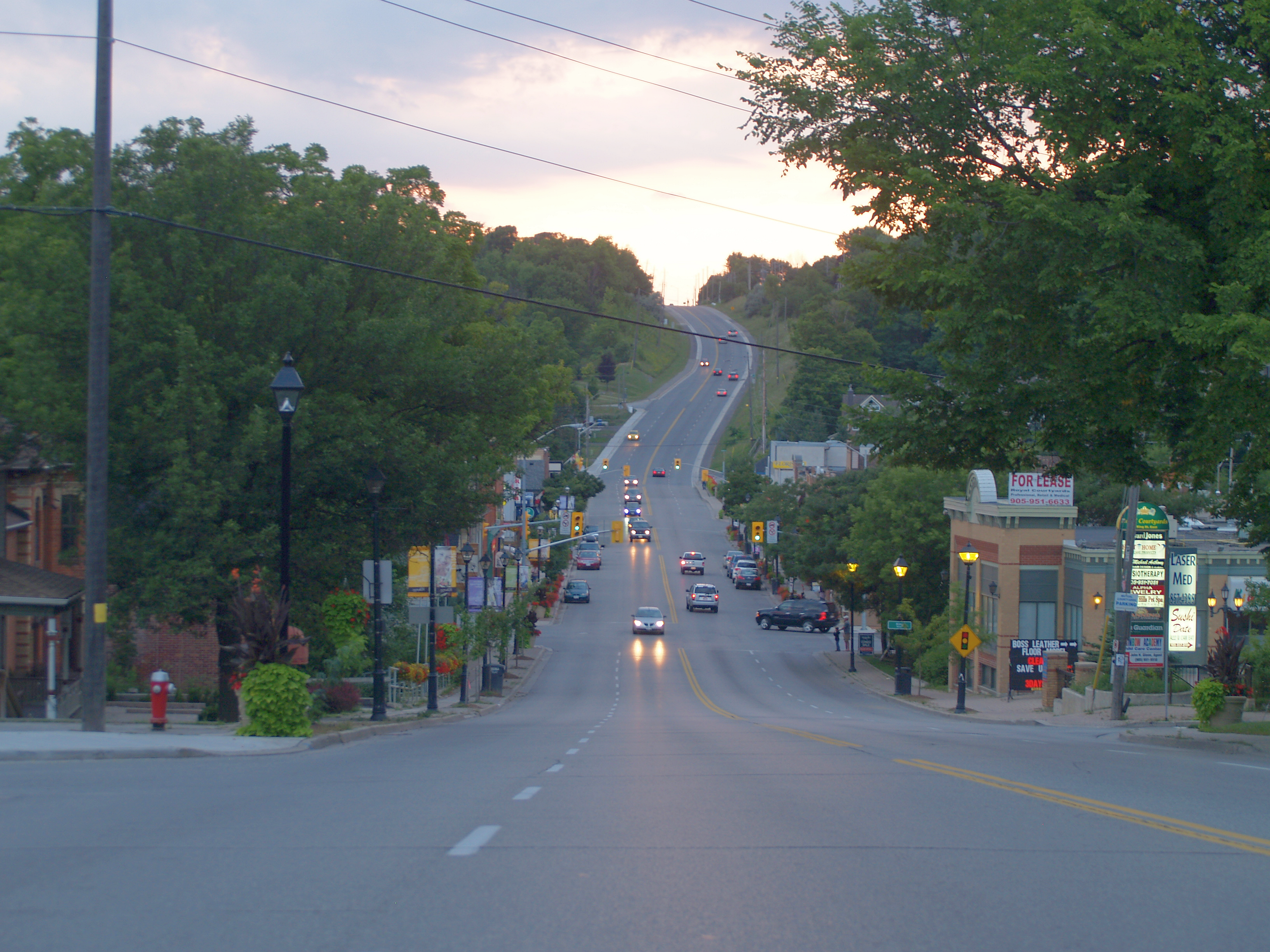
- Queen Street (Highway 50) in Bolton

- Location within Regional Municipality of Peel Location within Southern Ontario
- Coordinates: 43°52′50″N 79°44′17″W
- Country: Canada
- Province: Ontario
- Regional municipality: Peel
- Town: Caledon
- Ward: 5

Area
  - Land: 20.71 km^{2} (8.00 sq mi)

Population (2021)
  - Total: 26,795
  - Density: 1,294/km^{2} (3,350/sq mi)
- Time zone: UTC-5 (EST)
  - Summer (DST): UTC-4 (EDT)
- Forward Sortation Area: L7E
- Area codes: 905, 289, 365, and 742
- NTS Map: 30M13 Bolton
- GNBC Code: FDJLH

Bolton (2021 population 26,795) is an unincorporated town and is the most populous community in the town of Caledon, Ontario, Canada, in the Regional Municipality of Peel. It is located beside the Humber River, approximately 50 kilometres northwest of Toronto. In regional documents, it is referred to as a 'Rural Service Centre'. It has 26,795 residents in 9,158 total dwellings. The downtown area that historically defined the village is in a valley, through which flows the Humber River. The village extends on either side of the valley to the north and south.

== Geography ==
The conservation lands' forests dominate a large part of the north and the east, including along the Humber valley. These conservation lands have created several recreational areas, including parts of the Humber Valley Heritage Trail. Farmland and the protected Oak Ridges Moraine dominate the landscape surrounding the village.

There are two 400-series highways nearby, including Highway 427, about 9 km southeast (the highway's northern terminus being at Major Mackenzie Drive), and Highway 400, about 14 km east (exit at King Road).

To the northwest is the community of Glasgow, which pays homage to an earlier planned settlement also called Glasgow. The older settlement was established in 1855 but merged into Bolton in 1872. Old Glasgow was supposed to house mill workers, it later served as a summer getaway for Toronto’s Jewish community from 1925 to 1950, then home to Edelweiss Ski Club. The planned community has naturalized again and now exists as Edelweiss Park and Humber Valley Heritage Trail.

== History ==
The community, formerly known as Bolton Mills, was founded around 1822 when James Bolton helped build a flour mill for his relative George Bolton. By 1857, Bolton was a village with a population of 700 in the Township of Albion in Peel County. George Evans was a prominent early settler in the area.

It was established on the Humber River, on the line of the proposed Toronto, Grey and Bruce Railway. There were stages to and from Weston. The average price of land was $40 to $50 per acre.

== Transportation ==
=== Roads ===
Queen Street, formerly Highway 50, and now Peel Road 50, runs north-south through the community and is its main street. King Street (Peel Road 9) is the main east-west cross street. It continues outside Bolton beyond both ends and runs across the full width of Caledon.

=== Public transit ===
The Town of Caledon does not operate its own public transit system; however, transit service is provided by Brampton Transit (the transit system of the nearby City of Brampton), which operates Route 41 Bolton, serving the community and travelling south down Highway 50 to Highway 7/Queen Street at the border of Brampton and Vaughan to make connections with other Brampton Transit routes and York Region Transit. Route Caledon Community Services Transportation and Transhelp (operated by Region of Peel Accessible Transportation Services) provides paratransit services for the elderly, disabled, and infirm in Bolton and Caledon as a whole, and travels to select major destinations in Peel and York Regions.

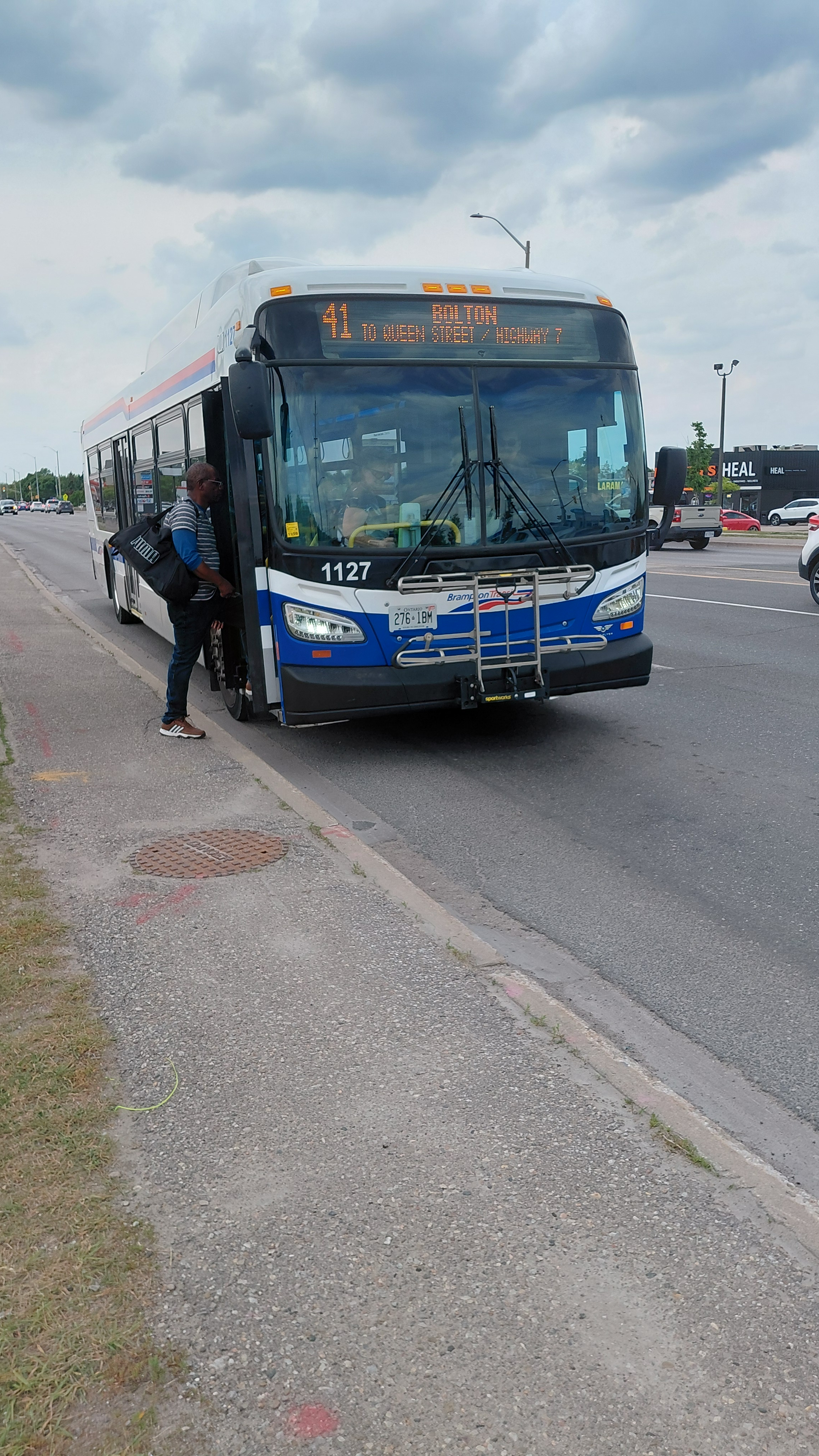
A Brampton Transit New Flyer XD40 operating on Route 41 Bolton

==== History ====
There were three earlier privately-operated transit services running within Bolton: In 1999 a company named Caledon Transit Incorporated ran a trial bus service in the community. In 2006, the growing population of Bolton prompted local resident Darren Parberry to start a second bus service with two routes using leased school buses, called Métis Transit. One route ran briefly in 2006. Both services ceased operations due to low ridership. Later, a private contractor, Voyago, formerly provided the Bolton line bus service, but also travelled south to make wider transit connections. Adult cash fares were $4.00 and there were no free transfers with other connecting transit agencies. This service was replaced in May 2024 by the present Brampton Transit service.

== Demographics ==
As of the 2021 census, the top three ethnic groups in Bolton are Italian (11,480; 43.4%), English (3,540; 13.4%) and Canadian (3,120; 11.8%).

== Organizations ==
- Freemasonry
- Kinsmen Club of Bolton, chartered in 1964

== Media ==
The 1996 Warner Bros. film Twister and the 2005 film Four Brothers were partially shot here.

== Education ==
Bolton is home to several public and Catholic schools:

Public Elementary Institutions:

- Allan Drive Middle School
- Ellwood Memorial Public School
- James Bolton Public School
- Macville Public School (just outside Bolton located in Caledon)

Public Secondary Institutions:

- Humberview Secondary School

Catholic Elementary Institutions:

- Holy Family Elementary School
- St. John Paul II Elementary School
- St. John the Baptist Elementary School
- St. Nicholas Elementary School

Catholic Secondary Institutions:

- St. Michael Catholic Secondary School

Private Institutions:

- King's College School (Just outside Bolton located in Caledon)
- Creative Children's Montessori School

== Notable residents ==
- Lorne Duguid – hockey player
- Keith McCreary – hockey player, former Chairman of the NHL Alumni, politician
- James East – politician
- Todd Elik – hockey player
- Organik – musician and founder of King of the Dot
- Steven Halko – hockey player
- Peter Holland – hockey player
- Andrew Mangiapane – hockey player
- Skye Sweetnam – singer
- Jason Saggo – UFC Fighter
- Joseph Shabason – ambient jazz musician
- Josh Alexander – professional wrestler
