= Albion Township, Ontario =

Albion Township
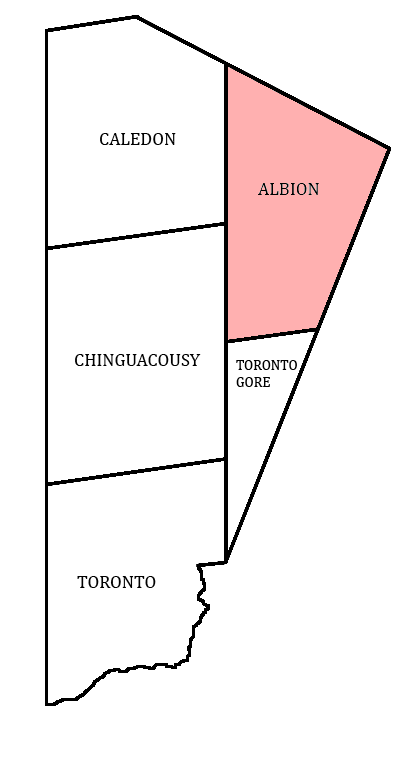
- Albion Township

- Location within Ontario
- Coordinates: 43°55′26″N 79°50′38″W
- Country: Canada
- Province: Ontario
- Region: Greater Toronto Area

Albion Township is a former incorporated municipality now part of the town of Caledon, in Peel County (now Region) in the Greater Toronto Area of Ontario, Canada. Its major population centre was Bolton. Albion Township was consolidated with Caledon Township and the northern half of Chinguacousy Township into the Town of Caledon.

Albion Road, a major roadway leading to the township from near Weston (today part of the City of Toronto) is named after it, although the name was not extended along former Highway 50 (which a section of Albion Road was a part of) into Peel following the highway's decommissioning and subsequent urbanization.

== See also ==
- List of townships in Ontario
