= Chinguacousy Township =

Geographic township in Ontario, Canada

Coordinates: 43°45′13″N 79°50′22″W

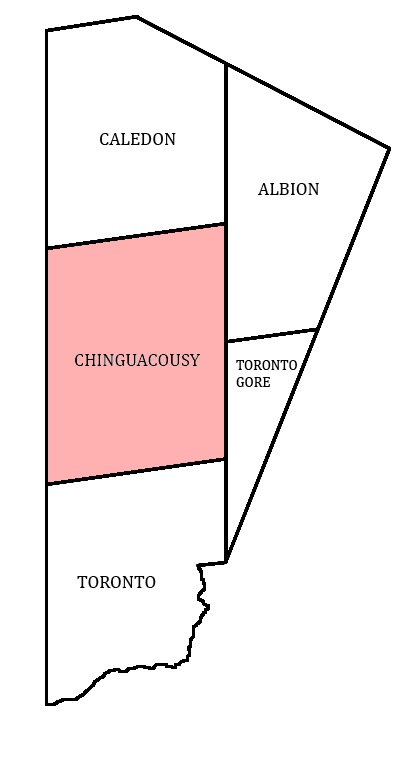
Chinguacousy Township within Peel County.

Chinguacousy Township /tʃɪŋˈkuːzi/ is a former municipality and present-day geographic township in the Regional Municipality of Peel, Ontario, Canada. In 1974, when Peel County became the Region of Peel, the township was split in half, with the northern half becoming part of the town of Caledon (previously a smaller township), and the southern half, along with the township of Toronto Gore, joining the Town of Brampton, which was then promoted to a city.

Chinguacousy Township spanned from what now is Winston Churchill Boulevard to Airport Road, Olde Base Line Road to Steeles Avenue.

Several villages were once located within Chinguacousy Township. In most cases only small remnants like churches and cemeteries of many of these former villages exist. Cheltenham is the largest preserved village, while Terra Cotta and Huttonville both have some historic buildings.

Bramalea, Canada's first satellite city was developed in Chinguacousy Township beginning in the 1960s just east of the-then separate Town of Brampton.

The Chinguacousy name lives on in present-day Brampton, including Chinguacousy Park, Chinguacousy Road, the Chinguacousy Concert Band, and Chinguacousy Secondary School (many places that were originally formed as a part of the Bramalea community).

The township was named in honour of an Anishinaabe chief, Shingwauk (Ojibwe: Zhingwaakoons, meaning: "Little White Pine").

== People from Chinguacousy ==
- Nathaniel Currie

== See also ==
- List of townships in Ontario
