= Caledon Township, Ontario =

Geographic township in Ontario, Canada

Coordinates: 43°51′03″N 80°00′03″W

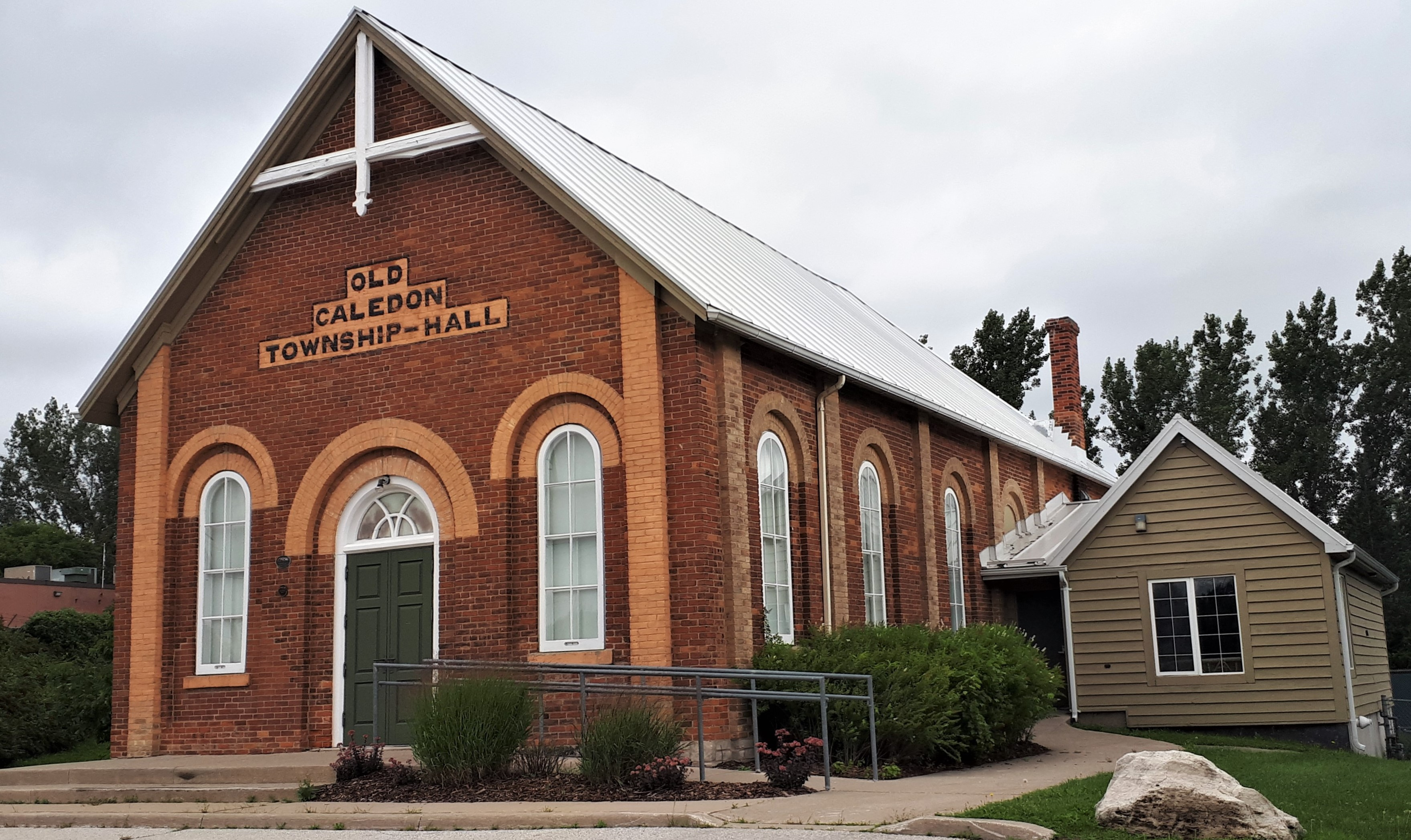
Old Caledon Township Hall

Caledon Township, Ontario was a historic incorporated township and is a present-day geographic township in the modern Region of Peel, Ontario, Canada. The township forms the northwest section of Caledon, Ontario.

Caledon Township was likely named by settlers, like Edward Ellis or by public voting. Many settlers had come from the area around Caledon, County Tyrone in Northern Ireland. In 1845, the population of the Township was 1,920. There were three grist-mills and a saw-mill.

== See also ==
- List of townships in Ontario
