= Lex MacKenzie =

Canadian politician

Major Lex MacKenzie MC

Ontario MPP
- In office 1945–1967
- Preceded by: George Herbert Mitchell
- Succeeded by: William Hodgson
- Constituency: York North

Personal details
- Born: Addison Alexander MacKenzie; 1 November 1885 Woodbridge, Ontario, Canada
- Died: 13 May 1970 (aged 84) Brampton, Ontario, Canada
- Resting place: St. Paul's Presbyterian Church, Vaughan
- Party: Progressive Conservative
- Occupation: Farmer; Soldier; MPP
- Nickname(s): A.A. Lex

Military service
- Allegiance: Dominion of Canada
- Branch/service: Canadian Militia: Canadian Expeditionary Force
- Years of service: 1904-1918
- Rank: Major
- Unit: The Governor General's Horse Guards; 4th Battalion, Canadian Mounted Rifles (CEF)
- Commands: 4th Company
- Battles/wars: World War I: Western Front; Battle of the Somme; Battle of Vimy Ridge (WIA)
- Awards: Military Cross

Addison Alexander "Lex" MacKenzie, MC (1 November 1885 – 13 May 1970) was a Canadian politician who represented York North in the Legislative Assembly of Ontario from 1945 to 1967 as a Progressive Conservative member.

== Background ==
MacKenzie was born to Douglas MacKenzie and Lydia Ann Addison in Woodbridge, Ontario (today a district in the City of Vaughan) on a farm (Lot 5 Concession 7) that was originally a land grant to his great-grandfather (and settled by his grandfather William MacKenzie (1819-1904) in 1842). He was educated in Woodbridge and then worked at a variety of jobs across the country.

In 1914, at the start of First World War, he enlisted in the 4th Battalion, Canadian Mounted Rifles and quickly rose to the rank of major because of his previous experience serving in the militia (The Governor General's Body Guard).

During the Battle of the Somme, MacKenzie led a reconnaissance party to observe the effects of the artillery fire and later led his men and assaulted the Germans positions. His efforts that day would earn him the Military Cross. The citation read: "For conspicuous gallantry in action. He carried out a daring reconnaissance of the enemy's wire in daylight. Later he led his Company with great courage and determination, greatly assisting the bombers by sniping the enemy as they brought up reinforcements."

MacKenzie went on to participate in the Battle of Vimy Ridge, leading the 4th company. During the action he was hit by shrapnel from an artillery shell and was seriously wounded. After the battle, he praised the men of his command: "What I say about our Toronto boys is true in every other branch of the army. We fought Monday, not for cities, but for Canada. Every Canadian battalion did well." His wounds were serious enough that he spent the rest of the war behind the front lines. He returned to farming after the war. Every Thanksgiving he held a turkey dinner for his neighbours.

== Politics ==
He developed an interest in politics and served on Woodbridge Town Council before running for provincial office.

He ran as the Progressive Conservative candidate in York North in 1943 but was defeated by CCF member, George Mitchell. In 1945 he ran again, this time defeating Mitchell.

He served as a backbench member of the house for the next 22 years and finally retired in 1967. He was not known as a strong speaker and made only two speeches but was remembered as a strong advocate for his riding constituents.

== Later life ==
After retiring from politics, MacKenzie sat on the Board of the Metropolitan Toronto Conservation Authority and was a charter member of the Woodbridge Horticultural Society. Just before his death, he was on his way to Peel Memorial Hospital when his ambulance was slowed by a parade. Upon learning who was in the ambulance, the marching pipers insisted on escorting him to the hospital.

In recognition of his long public service, Major Mackenzie Drive, a main east–west thoroughfare in York Region, and Alexander Mackenzie High School in Richmond Hill, Ontario, were named after him, as is Royal Canadian Legion Branch 414, in Woodbridge, Vaughan.

After his passing in 1970, the William Mackenzie house on his homestead (located on Lot 5, Concession 7, southeast of present-day Islington Ave. & Highway 7) was moved to Black Creek Pioneer Village in 1973. It reportedly incorporated the 1830s log cabin built by his great-grandfather John Brown (founder of Brownsville) that had been built on the hillside property overlooking the Humber River valley. The old homestead property was then redeveloped into the present-day Pioneer Lane residential housing neighbourhood in the mid-1970's.
