= Major Mackenzie Drive =

Road in Ontario, Canada

- York Regional Road 25
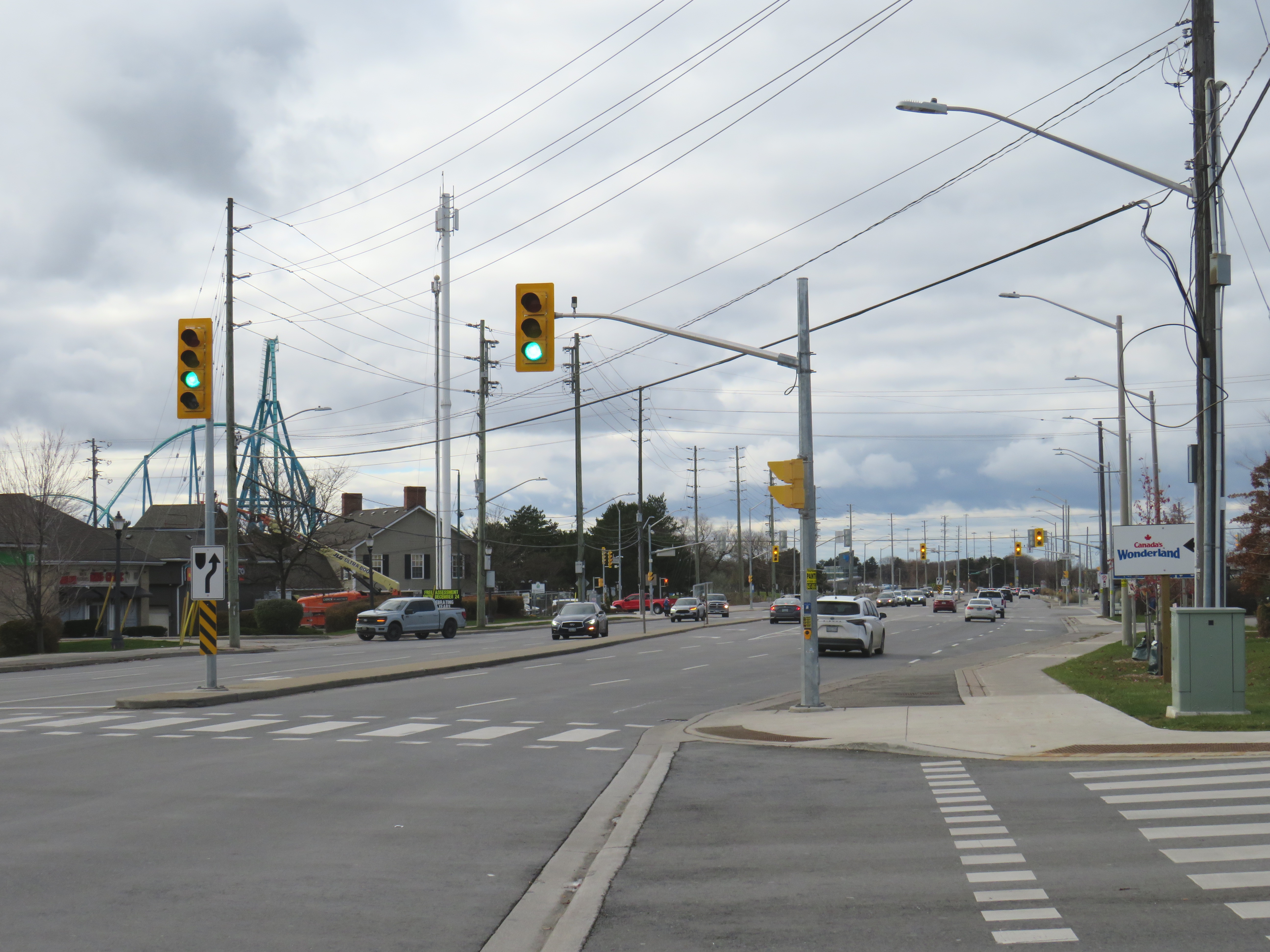
- Major Mackenzie Drive looking west to Jane Street and Canada's Wonderland

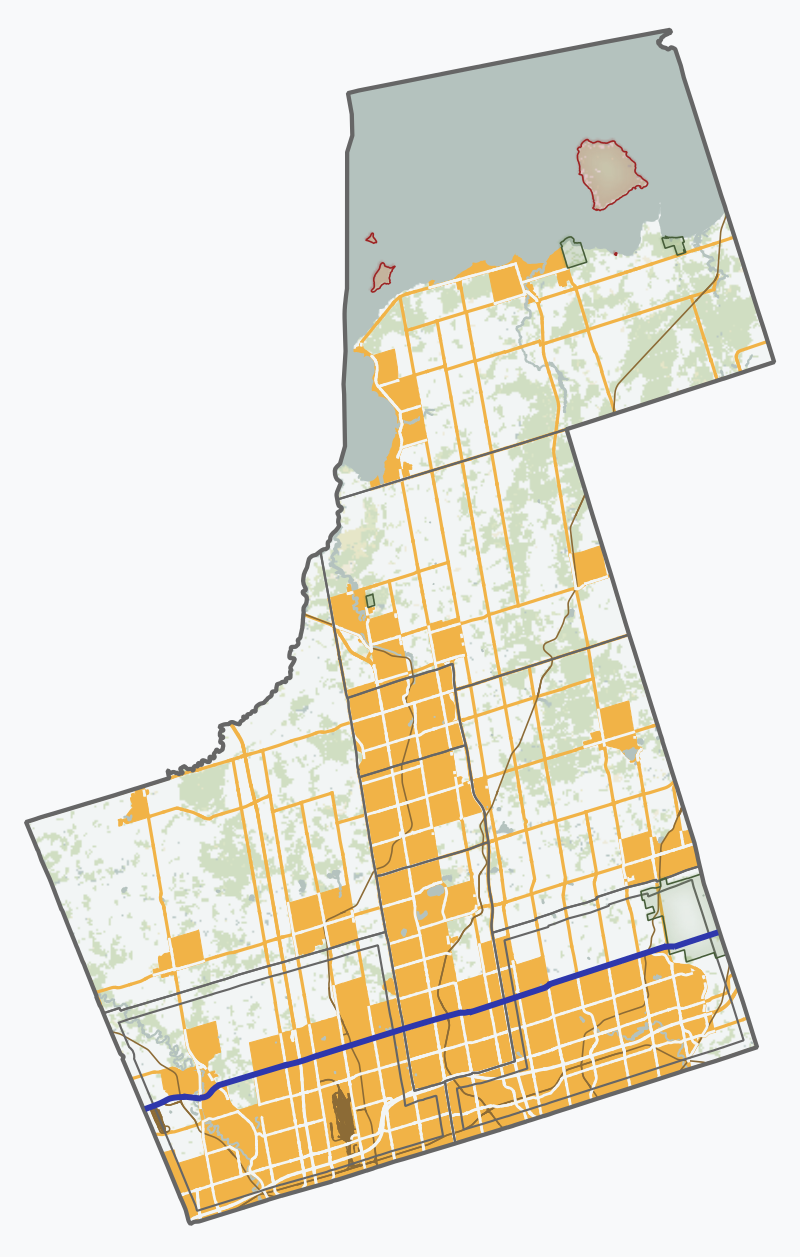
- Route of Major Mackenzie Drive across York Region (blue line)
- Namesake: Addison Alexander MacKenzie
- Maintained by: Region of York
- Length: 40.4 km (25.1 mi)
- Location: York Region (Vaughan, Richmond Hill, Markham)
- West end: (Former) Highway 50 In Brampton (Continues north as Coleraine Drive into Brampton)
- Major junctions: Highway 427 (Former) Highway 27; Islington Avenue; Weston Road; Highway 400; Jane Street; Keele Street; Dufferin Street; Bathurst Street; Yonge Street; Bayview Avenue; Leslie Street; Highway 404; Woodbine Avenue; Warden Avenue; Kennedy Road; McCowan Road; Highway 48 / Markham Road; Donald Cousens Parkway
- East end: York-Durham Line

Other
Nearby arterial roads
← Rutherford Road / Carrville Road / 16th Avenue	Teston Road / Elgin Mills Road →

Major Mackenzie Drive, often shortened to Major Mac, is a major east-west arterial road in southern York Region, Ontario, Canada, just north of Toronto. It is a York regional road, numbered as York Regional Road 25, and passes through the three cities of southern York Region: Vaughan, Ontario, Richmond Hill, and Markham. It does not continue outside of York Region as an east-west road, but does cross into Brampton (in Peel Region) as Coleraine Drive which immediately curves sharply at the boundary to head north towards Bolton.

== Name ==
The road is named after Lex MacKenzie, a former local politician and World War I veteran (with Major being a reference to his military rank), although the road is officially spelled "Major Mackenzie" with a lowercase K.

The section west of Yonge Street was originally known as Maple Side Road (after the community of Maple though which it passed) while the portion east of Yonge was Seventeenth Avenue before being named after Lex Mackenzie, although a bypassed cul-de-sac near Warden Avenue is still named Old '17th Avenue'.

== History ==
The road was laid out by early settlers as a concession road across the original York County to divide the land into farms. Most of the farmland has now been developed (although some remains protected in eastern Markham within the Rouge National Urban Park) as residential development expanded northwards in York Region.

In 2020, a new alignment of Major Mackenzie was constructed in tandem with the northward extension of Highway 427 between Huntington Road and York Road 27 (former Highway 27). The 427 extension opened on September 18, 2021.

== Communities ==
Communities Major Mackenzie Drive passes through as it runs across York Region, listed by municipality:

=== Vaughan ===
- Maple
- Kleinburg
- Woodbridge
- Patterson

=== Richmond Hill ===
- Downtown Richmond Hill (north side)
- Yongehurst
- Beverley Acres
- Headford

=== Markham ===
- Victoria Square
- Cathedraltown
- Cachet
- Berczy Village
- Wismer Commons
- Mount Joy
- Greensborough
- Cachet

== Road information ==
- Transportation: Mainly York Region Transit Routes 4, 6, and 25; Major Mackenzie West Terminal; serving the Viva Blue line

=== Road status ===
- Zoning: Mainly low-density residential in Vaughan and Markham, some developing, medium-density in Richmond Hill,
- Speed: Anywhere from 50–80 km/h with 60 km/h being the most common,

== Future ==
There are plans for a future connection between Major Mackenzie Drive and Mayfield Road in Brampton. The project is part of the Highway 427 Extension Area Transportation Master Plan, which aims to improve traffic flow and connectivity in the area. The new roadway is designated as Arterial A2 in the plan and will be a six-lane north-south connection. However, a specific construction timeline has not been announced yet.

== Landmarks ==
Notable sites along Major Mackenzie from east to west:

Landmark	Cross street / location	Notes	Image
CPKC Vaughan Intermodal	Highway 50	Canadian Pacific Kansas City intermodal freight terminal	
Kortright Centre for Conservation	Humber River	Large urban conservation area	
Canada's Wonderland	Highway 400	Canada's largest theme park, opened in 1981	
Major Mackenzie West Terminal	Amusement Drive	York Region Transit bus terminal	
Cortellucci Vaughan Hospital	Jane Street	342 bed hospital, opened in 2021	
Vaughan City Hall	Keele Street		
Maple GO station	East of Keele Street	Station on the GO Transit Barrie Line	
Mackenzie Richmond Hill Hospital	Trench Street	506 bed hospital, formerly York Central Hospital from its opening in 1963 until 2012	
Angus Glen Community Centre	Angus Glen Boulevard	Community centre in Markham's Angus Glen neighbourhood	
Angus Glen Golf Club	Kennedy Road	Hosted the Canadian Open in 2002 and 2007 and golf events in the 2015 Pan American Games	
Rouge National Urban Park	Easternmost section of street to York-Durham Line	Urban national park centred around the Rouge River watershed	
