= Clifford Case (Canadian politician) =

Canadian politician

Ontario MPP
- In office 1929–1934
- Preceded by: Peter William Pearson
- Succeeded by: Morgan Baker
- Constituency: York North

Personal details
- Born: July 17, 1897; King township, Ontario
- Died: December 30, 1940 (aged 43); York County, Ontario
- Political party: Progressive Conservative
- Spouse: Mary Dunbar
- Children: 3
- Occupation: Lawyer

Clifford Case, KC (July 17, 1897 – December 30, 1940) was a lawyer and political figure in Ontario, Canada. He represented York North in the Legislative Assembly of Ontario from 1929 to 1934 as a Conservative member.

== Background ==
Case was born on a farm in King township to parents George Case and Annie Morning. He was educated in Aurora and at Osgoode Hall, graduating in 1924. In 1923 he married Mary Dunbar and together they raised three sons. Case practised law in Aurora and Toronto and was named King's Counsel in 1929. Case died in York County Hospital at the age of 43.

== Politics ==
Case served as deputy reeve of Aurora in 1928. In 1929 he ran as the Conservative candidate in the riding of York North. He defeated Liberal incumbent Peter Pearson by 195 votes. He was defeated by Liberal candidate Morgan Baker in the next election.
