= Peter William Pearson =

Canadian politician from Ontario

Member of the Ontario Provincial Parliament for York North
- In office December 1, 1926 – September 17, 1929
- Preceded by: William Keith
- Succeeded by: Clifford Case

Personal details
- Born: December 20, 1862 York, Ontario, Canada
- Died: September 16, 1948 (aged 85) Kitchener, Canada
- Party: Liberal

Peter William Pearson (December 20, 1862 – September 16, 1946) was a Canadian politician from the Liberal Party of Ontario. He represented York North in the Legislative Assembly of Ontario from 1926 to 1929.

== See also ==
- 17th Parliament of Ontario
