= Morgan Baker (politician) =

Canadian politician from Ontario

Member of the Ontario Provincial Parliament for York North
- In office June 19, 1934 – June 30, 1943
- Preceded by: Clifford Case
- Succeeded by: George Herbert Mitchell

Personal details
- Party: Liberal

Morgan Baker was a Canadian politician who was Liberal MPP for York North from 1934 to 1943.

== See also ==
- 19th Parliament of Ontario
- 20th Parliament of Ontario
