= York North (Ontario provincial electoral district) =

Former provincial electoral district in Ontario, Canada

Ontario electoral district

Defunct provincial electoral district
- Legislature: Legislative Assembly of Ontario
- District created: 1867
- District abolished: 2007
- First contested: 1867
- Last contested: 2003

Demographics
- Census division: York Region
- Census subdivision(s): Aurora (until 1999), Chippewas of Georgina Island First Nation, East Gwillimbury, Georgina, King, Newmarket, Vaughan (until 1987), Whitchurch-Stouffville (until 1987)

York North was a provincial riding in Ontario, Canada, that was represented in the Legislative Assembly of Ontario from 1867 to 2007. The provincial riding was known as York—Mackenzie from 1995 to 1999.

In 2007, the Ontario provincial electoral district was eliminated when it was matched to the redistributed ridings of the federal districts. Julia Munro, who held the York North seat, was re-elected in the new riding of York—Simcoe.

== Members of Provincial Parliament ==
York North
| Assembly | Years | Member | Party |
|---|---|---|---|
| 1st | 1867–1871 | John McMurrich | Liberal |
| 2nd | 1871–1875 | Alfred Boultbee | Conservative |
| 3rd | 1875–1879 | Joseph Henry Widdifield (Note: Widdifield resigned in 1888 to take a position of county sheriff.) | Liberal |
| 4th | 1879–1883 | Joseph Henry Widdifield | Liberal |
| 5th | 1883–1886 | Joseph Henry Widdifield | Liberal |
| 6th | 1886–1888 | Joseph Henry Widdifield | Liberal |
| 6th | 1888–1890 | Elihu James Davis | Liberal |
| 7th | 1890–1894 | Elihu James Davis | Liberal |
| 8th | 1894–1898 | Elihu James Davis | Liberal |
| 9th | 1898–1899 | Elihu James Davis | Liberal |
| 10th | 1899–1905 | Elihu James Davis | Liberal |
| 11th | 1905–1908 | Thomas Herbert Lennox | Conservative |
| 12th | 1908–1911 | Thomas Herbert Lennox | Conservative |
| 13th | 1911–1914 | Thomas Herbert Lennox | Conservative |
| 14th | 1914–1919 | Thomas Herbert Lennox | Conservative |
| 15th | 1919–1923 | Thomas Herbert Lennox | Conservative |
| 16th | 1923–1926 | William Keith | Conservative |
| 17th | 1926–1929 | Peter William Pearson | Liberal |
| 18th | 1929–1934 | Clifford Case | Conservative |
| 19th | 1934–1937 | Morgan Baker | Liberal |
| 20th | 1937–1943 | Morgan Baker | Liberal |
| 21st | 1943–1945 | George Herbert Mitchell | Co-operative Commonwealth |
| 22nd | 1945–1948 | A. A. MacKenzie | Progressive Conservative |
| 23rd | 1948–1951 | A. A. MacKenzie | Progressive Conservative |
| 24th | 1951–1955 | A. A. MacKenzie | Progressive Conservative |
| 25th | 1955–1959 | A. A. MacKenzie | Progressive Conservative |
| 26th | 1959–1963 | A. A. MacKenzie | Progressive Conservative |
| 27th | 1963–1967 | A. A. MacKenzie | Progressive Conservative |
| 28th | 1967–1971 | William Hodgson | Progressive Conservative |
| 29th | 1971–1975 | William Hodgson | Progressive Conservative |
| 30th | 1975–1977 | William Hodgson | Progressive Conservative |
| 31st | 1977–1981 | William Hodgson | Progressive Conservative |
| 32nd | 1981–1985 | William Hodgson | Progressive Conservative |
| 33rd | 1985–1987 | Greg Sorbara | Liberal |
| 34th | 1987–1990 | Charles Beer | Liberal |
| 35th | 1990–1995 | Charles Beer | Liberal |
| 36th | 1995–1999 | Frank Klees | Progressive Conservative |
| 37th | 1999–2003 | Julia Munro | Progressive Conservative |
| 38th | 2003–2007 | Julia Munro | Progressive Conservative |
Sourced from the Ontario Legislative Assembly
Redistributed into York—Simcoe, Newmarket—Aurora and Oak Ridges—Markham after 2007

== Election results ==
=== 1867–1879 ===
1867 Ontario general election
| Party | Candidate | Votes | % |
|---|---|---|---|
| Liberal | John McMurrich | 1,369 | 54.20 |
| Conservative | Alfred Boultbee | 1,157 | 45.80 |
| Total valid votes | | 2,526 | 73.90 |
| Eligible voters | | 3,418 | |
| Liberal pickup new district. | | | |
Source: Elections Ontario

1871 Ontario general election
| Party | Candidate | Votes | % | ±% |
|---|---|---|---|---|
| Conservative | Alfred Boultbee | 1,306 | 50.10 | +4.29 |
| Liberal | John McMurrich | 1,301 | 49.90 | −4.29 |
| Turnout | | 2,607 | 66.64 | −7.26 |
| Eligible voters | | 3,912 | | |
| Conservative gain from Liberal | | Swing | | +4.29 |
Source: Elections Ontario

1875 Ontario general election
| Party | Candidate | Votes | % | ±% |
|---|---|---|---|---|
| Liberal | Joseph Henry Widdifield | 1,835 | 57.69 | +7.78 |
| Independent | E. Jackson | 1,346 | 42.31 | |
| Total valid votes | | 3,181 | 65.36 | −1.28 |
| Eligible voters | | 4,867 | | |
| Liberal gain from Conservative | | Swing | | +7.78 |
Source: Elections Ontario

1879 Ontario general election
| Party | Candidate | Votes | % | ±% |
|---|---|---|---|---|
| Liberal | Joseph Henry Widdifield | 2,200 | 56.54 | −1.15 |
| Conservative | N. Murphy | 1,691 | 43.46 | |
| Total valid votes | | 3,891 | 68.77 | +3.41 |
| Eligible voters | | 5,658 | | |
| Liberal hold | | Swing | | −1.15 |
Source: Elections Ontario

=== 1959–1963 ===
1959 Ontario general election
| Party | Candidate | Votes | % | ±% |
|---|---|---|---|---|
| Progressive Conservative | Addison Lex Mackenzie | 12,981 | 47.16 | -1.58 |
| Liberal | Donald Plaxton | 9,982 | 36.27 | -0.95 |
| Co-operative Commonwealth | Stanley Hall | 4,560 | 16.57 | +2.53 |
| Total valid votes | | 27,523 | 98.95 | |
| Total rejected, unmarked and declined ballots | | 293 | 1.05 | +0.13 |
| Turnout | | 27,816 | 49.89 | -5.23 |
| Eligible voters | | 55,752 | | |
| Progressive Conservative hold | | Swing | | -0.31 |

1963 Ontario general election
| Party | Candidate | Votes | % | ±% |
|---|---|---|---|---|
| Progressive Conservative | Addison Lex Mackenzie | 18,233 | 49.22 | +2.06 |
| Liberal | Donald Plaxton | 12,000 | 32.40 | -3.87 |
| New Democratic | Robert McVey | 5,959 | 16.09 | -0.48 |
| Independent | William Fuller | 850 | 2.29 | |
| Total valid votes | | 37,042 | 99.35 | |
| Total rejected, unmarked and declined ballots | | 244 | 0.65 | -0.40 |
| Turnout | | 37,286 | 57.35 | +7.46 |
| Eligible voters | | 65,016 | | |
| Progressive Conservative hold | | Swing | | +2.97 |

=== 1999–2003 ===
1999 Ontario general election
| Party | Candidate | Votes | % |
|---|---|---|---|
| Progressive Conservative | Julia Munro | 29,613 | 61.81 |
| Liberal | John Volpe | 15,755 | 32.89 |
| New Democratic | Steve Saysell | 2,236 | 4.67 |
| Natural Law | Kwok-Lin Mary Wan | 305 | 0.64 |
| Total valid votes | | 47,909 | 99.27 |
| Total rejected, unmarked and declined ballots | | 353 | 0.73 |
| Turnout | | 48,262 | 58.63 |
| Eligible voters | | 82,320 | |

2003 Ontario general election
| Party | Candidate | Votes | % | ±% |
|---|---|---|---|---|
| Progressive Conservative | Julia Munro | 24,517 | 47.19 | -14.62 |
| Liberal | John Taylor | 21,054 | 40.53 | +7.64 |
| New Democratic | Sylvia Gerl | 4,029 | 7.76 | +3.09 |
| Green | Bob Burrows | 1,854 | 3.57 | |
| Family Coalition | Simone Williams | 497 | 0.96 | |
| Total valid votes | | 51,951 | 99.29 | |
| Total rejected, unmarked and declined ballots | | 369 | 0.71 | -0.03 |
| Turnout | | 52,320 | 58.58 | -0.05 |
| Eligible voters | | 89,320 | | |
| Progressive Conservative hold | | Swing | | -11.13 |

== See also ==
- List of Ontario provincial electoral districts
- Canadian provincial electoral districts
