= Carlo Baldassarra =

Italian-Canadian businessman

- Born: 1939 (age 85–86); Italy
- Known for: Founder of Greenpark Group; First owner of York United FC
- Spouse: Angela Baldassarra
- Children: 3

Carlo Baldassarra (Italian: [ˈkarlo baldasˈsarra]; born 1939) is an Italian-Canadian businessman who founded homebuilder company Greenpark Group.

== Career and family ==
Carlo Baldassarra was born in Italy, and immigrated to Canada in 1958 at the age of 19. Less than 10 years later, in 1967, Baldassarra founded a homebuilder company, Greenpark Group along with two partners Jack Wine and Philip Rechtsman. Greenpark Group is now fully owned by Carlo and his family. He and his wife Angela had three children Mauro, Armando and Michael, who work as senior executives at Greenpark Group.

In 2018, Greenpark Group was revealed as the inaugural owners of York United FC (then known as York9 FC) of the Canadian Premier League, with Michael as chairman.

Baldassarra was inducted into the Italian Walk of Fame in 2012, which pays tribute to achievements of Italians. On April 25, 2014, Baldassarra received a Lifetime Achievement Award at the 34th annual Building Industry and Land Development Association awards, recognizing his impacts within the building and development industry. In December 2017, Baldassarra donated $5 million to the construction of the Cortellucci Vaughan Hospital.

During the 2023 season, it was announced that York United was sold from the Baldassarra family to the Canadian Soccer Business with plans to transfer the club to new ownership.
