= Cortellucci Vaughan Hospital =

- Mackenzie Health
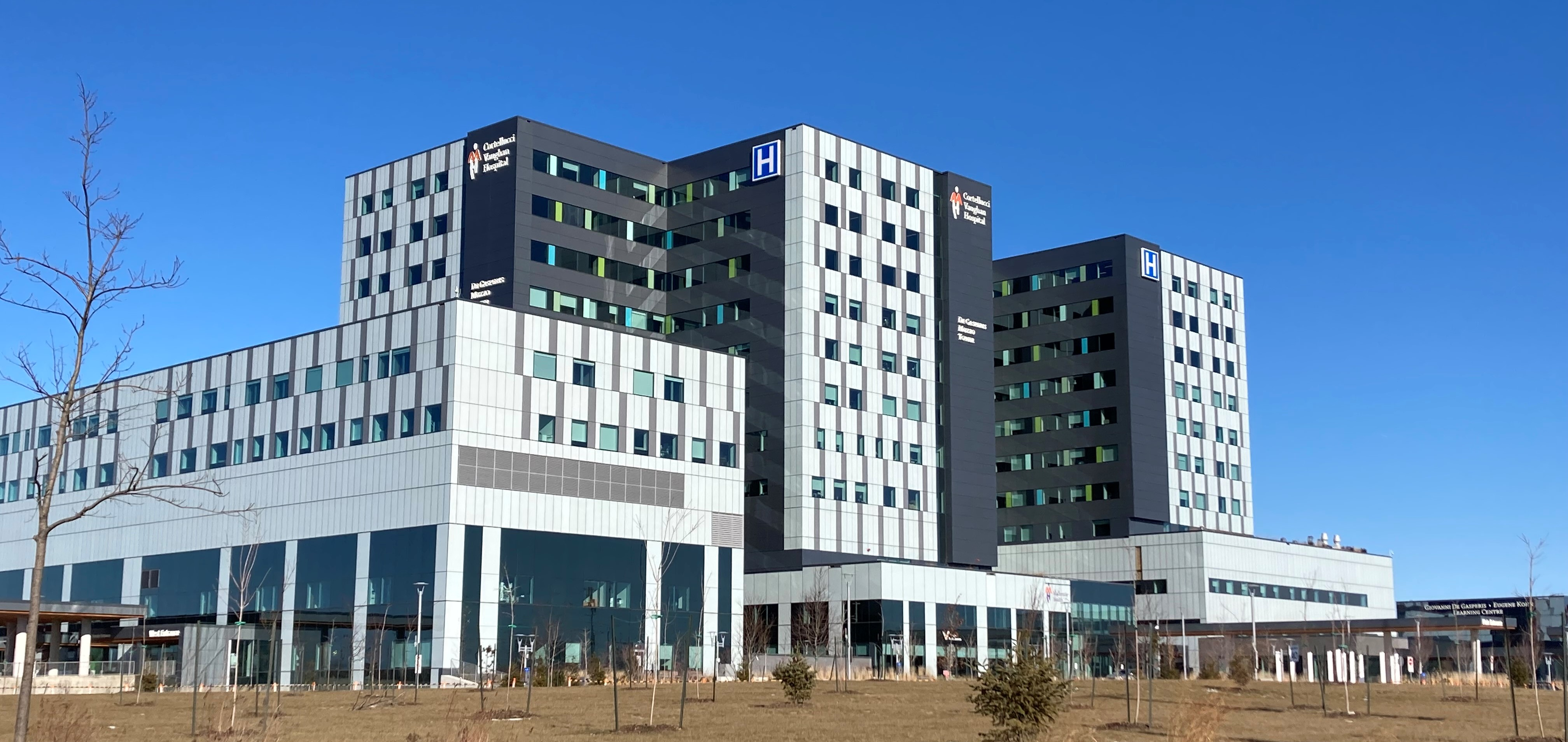
- Cortellucci Vaughan Hospital

Geography
- Location: 3200 Major Mackenzie Drive West, Vaughan, Ontario, Canada
- Coordinates: 43°51′00″N 79°32′24″W

Organization
- Care system: Public Medicare (Canada) (OHIP)
- Type: General

Services
- Emergency department: Yes
- Beds: 342

History
- Constructed: 2016
- Opened: February 7, 2021; 5 years ago

Links
- Website: mackenziehealth.ca/mvh/
- Lists: Hospitals in Canada

Cortellucci Vaughan Hospital (pronounced [kortelˈluttʃi]; originally proposed name; Mackenzie Vaughan Hospital) is a hospital in Vaughan, Ontario, Canada. Construction of the hospital was completed in September 2020. It opened on 7 February 2021 to alleviate hospital capacity pressures caused by the COVID-19 pandemic in Ontario, and opened for full service on 6 June 2021. It is operated by Mackenzie Health, which also operates Mackenzie Richmond Hill Hospital. Its service area is primarily Vaughan, King, and Richmond Hill in the southwestern and south-central portions of York Region. Its construction cost about CA$1.7 billion.

The 11-storey hospital is situated on a 62-acre (25 ha) property on the northwest corner of Jane Street and Major Mackenzie Drive (York Regional Road 25), adjacent to Canada's Wonderland.

== History ==
=== Proposal ===
On 16 January 2004, the city of Vaughan established the Vaughan Health Care Foundation (VHCF), an independent non-profit organization with primary task to "bring a hospital and ancillary services" to Vaughan. Its chairman was Michael di Biase. The VHCF was required to raise about $200 million to fund the city's share of the projected $1.3 billion construction costs and for acquisition of equipment. Michael DeGasperis later became chairman of the board, and in November 2007 he and others established the privately owned Vaughan Health Campus of Care (VHCC). DeGasperis became chairman of VHCC, and board member and insurance businessman Sam Ciccolini became chairman of VHCF.

The group campaigned to build a hospital in Vaughan, and with local community and political support, in 2007 the Government of Ontario gave official approval to build a hospital in Vaughan, and in October 2008 it directed the Central LHIN (the regional Local Health Integration Network) to create the master plan for development of the hospital. At this time, construction of the hospital was expected to start in 2011.

Search for a suitable site began in 2007, and VHCC approached landowners of at least nine sites in Vaughan to evaluate its suitability to build a hospital and other health care services. A 2008 report by Deloitte Consulting commissioned by the Central LHIN stated that the proposed hospital should be located on the Highway 400 corridor. In 2009, VHCC negotiated a deal with Cedar Fair to acquire the northern portion of land on the Canada's Wonderland campus. The city of Vaughan paid $60 million for 82 acres.

=== Land use dispute ===
Development of the land was to be administered by VHCC. In 2011, the Government of Ontario stated that Mackenzie Health would build the hospital, The government encouraged the foundations to merge, to which the foundations were initially amenable, but ultimately prompted a dispute between VHCC, Mackenzie Health, and the City of Vaughan. The focus of the dispute was the area of the acquired land allocated for the hospital, and the development of the remaining portion. A VHCC letter to the city stated that the agreement they had signed stipulated 40 acres of the 82 acquired were to be allocated to the hospital; the Mackenzie Health CEO stated that 50 acres would be necessary to build the hospital and for future expansion, and that the city would provide the requested 50 acres.

On 16 March 2011, Minister of State in the federal cabinet Gary Goodyear announced that VHCC had been awarded a $10 million grant from the Economic Development Agency. Greg Sorbara stated that this was a "reward for getting Julian Fantino elected" in the November 2010 by-election for the federal electoral district of Vaughan. DeGasperis and Sam Ciccolini, members of the VHCC board of directors, were fundraising co-chairs for Fantino's election campaign. The grant prompted a complaint to the Auditor General of Canada, and a press release by the CEO of Mackenzie Health stating that grant funds were not "being directly contributed from the federal government for the planning and/or construction of the hospital". The grant was also criticized for the perceived impropriety of the federal government funding projects of provincial jurisdiction (health care). In March 2012, a letter from VHCC to the Economic Development Agency stated that VHCC could not secure the land transfer and the $20 million contribution from the city of Vaughan, and thus the project was stalled. The Economic Development Agency deallocated the remaining $8.7 million of its contribution. VHCC had spent the allocated funds for a Deloitte and Touche report, and consultant fees.

In May 2012, after Mackenzie Health announced its intention to establish its own fundraising foundation, VHCC abandoned its fundraising operations and affiliation with the project. The $12.3 raised by VHCF was allocated to the Vaughan Hospital Building and Equipment Trust Fund. In September 2012, VHCC removed its signage from the hospital site.

In a September 2013 letter to the city of Vaughan, DeGasperis stated that VHCC could claim damages if more than 40 acres of the land was allocated for the hospital. From 2011 to 2015, DeGasperis challenged city decisions involving that land. In a 2014 interview, DeGasperis stated that VHCC considered Mackenzie Health's request as "trying anything to get this extra 10 acres of land under their control" for development of ancillary health care services, which was the mandate of VHCC for the non-core hospital lands.

Resident property taxpayers complained that development of the site acquired with tax revenues should not be controlled by a private developer.

In April 2015, Mackenzie Health and the city of Vaughan signed a lease deal for a nominal charge of $2. The 99-year lease granted the hospital corporation operated by Mackenzie Health 40 acres (16 hectares) of land for development of the hospital, 10 acres (4.0 hectares) for future expansion, and a right to determine the type of development that may occur on another 12 acres (4.9 hectares). An additional condition of the deal was to terminate the agreement with Vaughan Health Campus of Care.

On 3 June 2015, VHCC and the city of Vaughan signed an agreement by which VHCC abandoned claims on 62 acres of the site, and VHCC and the city would jointly develop 15 acres of the remaining land for ancillary health care services.

The agreement terminated the dispute, which had stalled the development of the hospital by four years.

=== Funding ===
The project is funded by various sources. The land acquired from Canada's Wonderland were purchased via an $80 million debenture from the city of Vaughan, which implemented a property tax surcharge in 2009 to recoup the costs. The surcharge will be assessed until 2022. By 2008, approximately $4 million had been raised via a $200 voluntary developer levy on each newly constructed house in Vaughan.

The Regional Municipality of York allocated $117 million for the project, and the Government of Ontario $58 million for planning, design, and tendering. About 90 percent of the construction costs was borne by the Government of Ontario, and the remainder was funded from donations from private sources, including residents and businesses. The community fundraising project, named "Exceptional Care Belongs Here" led by Greg Sorbara (who had donated $5 million himself), had a goal to raise $250 million, and to fund purchase of the furnishings and equipment, in addition to the 10 percent portion of the construction costs. The project received a $10 million donation from Magna International in October 2015, and $10 million from Vaughan businessman Vic De Zen and his wife Angelina in September 2016. In August 2017, the De Gasperis and Muzzo families jointly donated $15 million; the hospital's west wing was named the De Gasperis-Muzzo Tower in recognition of the families' contributions, though there was controversy as Marco Muzzo was involved in a fatal drunk driving accident that killed three children and their grandfather in 2015. In December 2017, Carlo Baldassarra and family donated $5 million. In June 2018, the hospital received a $20 million joint gift from the De Gasperis and Kohn families to help build the Giovanni De Gasperis and Eugene Kohn Learning Centre which was to be the most technologically advanced education facility within a Canadian community hospital. Early fundraising efforts were conducted by Vaughan Health Care Foundation, a charitable sister company of VHCC established in 2004; it raised $9 million, which DeGasperis said is in an irrevocable trust fund for the hospital, but which would not be given to the Mackenzie Health Foundation. In June 2019, the Cortellucci family made the largest single donation of $40 million, bringing the total amount raised to more than $160 million as part of the "Exceptional Care Belongs Here" campaign. In 2022, businessman David Braley donated $15 million, and the hospital's east wing was named the David Braley Tower.

In addition to direct donations, community fundraising is accomplished with events, such as the "Ride for Health" and annual fun runs including "Run for Vaughan" and "Richview Manor Strides for Stroke 5K Run/Walk.

=== Development ===
Site plan for the hospital lands between Highway 400 (left), Jane Street (right), and Major Mackenzie Drive (bottom). The Mackenzie Vaughan Hospital is on 'block 2' at the right, blocks 1, 4, 5 and 7 (in orange) are for privately-owned ancillary health-care service businesses, and blocks 8 and 9 (in light blue) are stormwater runoff ponds. The grey blocks are parking lots. Visible at the bottom is the planned transit terminal.

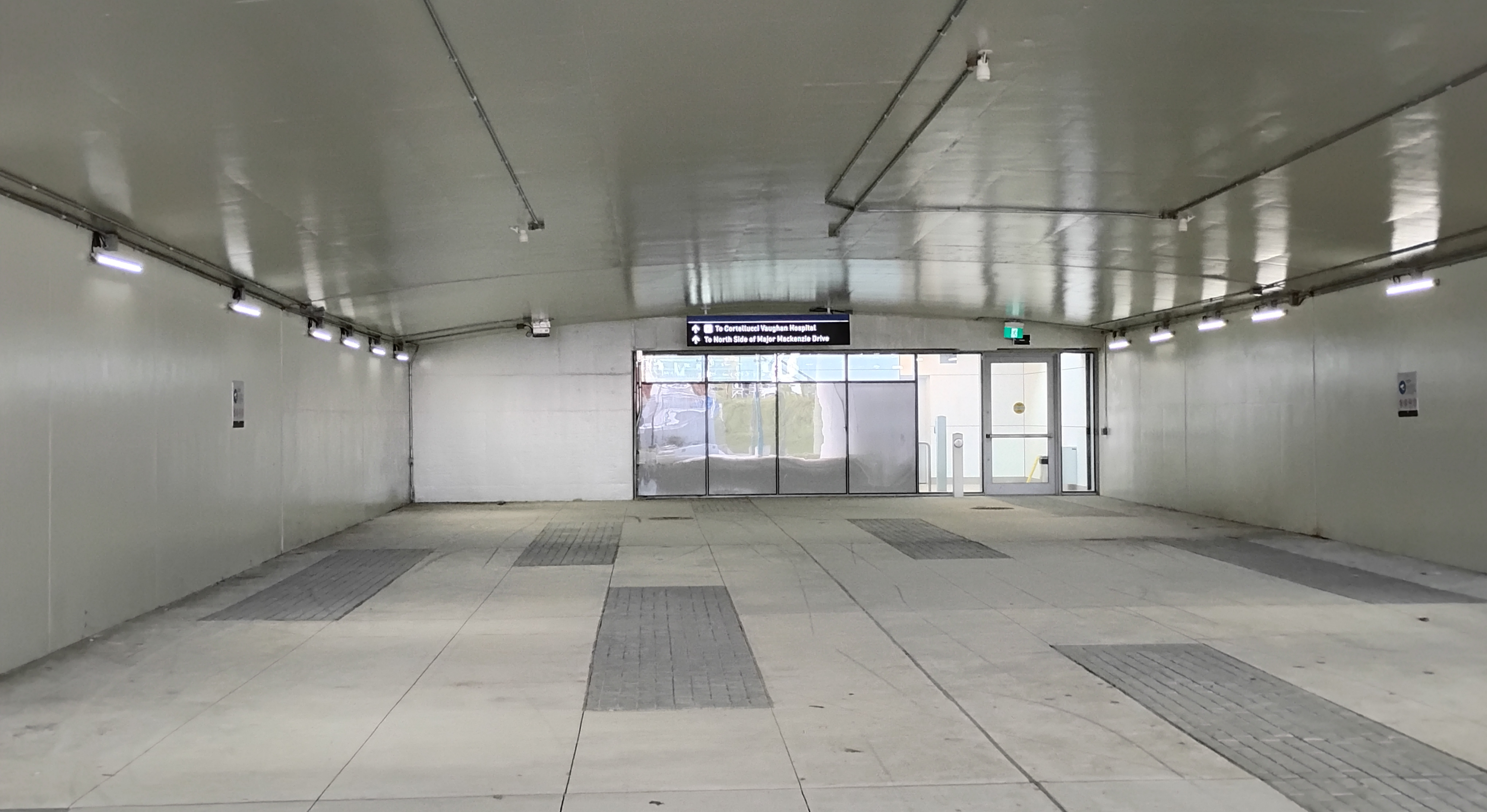
Walkway under Major Mackenzie Drive connecting the hospital to the Major Mackenzie West Terminal

In March 2014, Infrastructure Ontario and Mackenzie Health began a request for qualification for the construction project, stating that the primary criteria were "construction capability, experience and financial capacity to deliver a project of this size and scope". This resulted in three consortia being shortlisted as bidders for the project. At a news conference held on 29 June 2015, Vaughan councillors and provincial ministers announced that the request for proposals had been initiated, requesting bid submissions from the shortlisted consortia. Two final bids, from Hospital Infrastructure Partners and Plenary Health, were evaluated, and one chosen to build the hospital starting in mid 2016. The $1.3 billion contract was awarded to the Plenary Health bid in 2016, consisting of developer Plenary Group Canada, architecture firm Stantec Architects, planning and design company RTKL, design-build and construction management company PCL Constructors, facility management company Johnson Controls Canada, and RBC Capital Markets.

In 2014, the city of Vaughan spent $27 million for two phases of development, the first for site earthworks and site access modifications to Canada's Wonderland, the second for site stormwater management, sanitary works, water servicing, storm works, and roadworks on Jane Street.

In late 2015, the city of Vaughan refined details to enter into a memorandum of understanding with Mackenzie Health for the construction and operation of a pedestrian walkway under Major Mackenzie Drive from the future hospital to a transit terminal being developed on the south side of the street adjacent to Canada's Wonderland. It was built by reconstructing an existing underpass originally built for vehicular access to the theme park, and is fully accessible. The transit terminal, named the Major Mackenzie West Terminal, opened on November 6, 2022, and is served by York Region Transit and GO Transit buses.

The groundbreaking ceremony for the hospital was held on October 25, 2016.

=== Opening ===
On 16 June 2020, the unopened Mackenzie Vaughan Hospital was renamed the "Cortellucci Vaughan Hospital" in recognition of the $40 million donation from the Cortellucci family.

Construction of the hospital was completed in September 2020. On 18 January 2021, Premier Doug Ford announced that the hospital would open on 7 February to provide a total of 185 beds, including over 35 critical care beds and 150 general medicine beds, to support COVID-19 patients from other hospitals and alleviate hospital capacity pressures due to the pandemic in Ontario. It opened on 7 February with 42 patients on its first day. The emergency department was not open at that time.

As of April 2021, it was the only health care facility in Canada exclusively attending to COVID-19 patients. By 6 June 2021, it had tended to 514 patients transferred from other Ontario hospitals.

It opened as a full service hospital on 6 June 2021, with the Magna Emergency room opening at 10:00 that morning.

== Services ==
The hospital has 342 beds, 1,800 full-time staff, and 100 specialist physicians. Approximately 90 percent of beds are in single-occupancy rooms. The hospital is expected to handle 140,000 medical imaging exams, 6,300 surgeries, 3,100 births, and 1,800 urgent care pediatric visits annually. It has a 35-bed intensive care unit.

The 35,000-square-foot (3,300 m^{2}) emergency department, named Magna Emergency in honour of the donation by Magna International, has a capacity of about 75,000 annual visits.

Other services include:

- surgical services and operating rooms
- diagnostic imaging
- ambulatory clinics
- intensive care
- acute care patient rooms to prevent and control infection

In November 2015, Mackenzie Health signed an 18-year managed equipment services contract with Philips, which would provide room design, diagnostics, alarm management, predictive analytics, and other medical technology services for Mackenzie Vaughan Hospital and Mackenzie Richmond Hill Hospital. The managed services contract includes "procurement, installation, systems integration, maintenance and timely updates".

The hospital operates a Woman and Child centre, Inpatient Integrated Stroke unit, and Inpatient Mental Health program.

== York University School of Medicine ==
In 2024 the province of Ontario announced the funding for the creation of a School of Medicine with York University and will be located next to the hospital.

== See also ==
- Lists of hospitals in Ontario
