= Ontario Highway 50 =

Former Ontario provincial highway

King's Highway 50
- Peel Regional Road 50; York Regional Road 24 (unsigned); Simcoe County Road 50

Route information
- Maintained by the Regional Municipalities of Peel and York and the County of Simcoe
- Length: 53.5 km (33.2 mi)
- Existed: August 12, 1936–January 1, 1998

Major junctions
- South end: Highway 27 – Toronto
- Highway 7 – Vaughan; Highway 49; Highway 9 – Mono Mills
- North end: Highway 89 – Alliston

Location
- Country: Canada
- Province: Ontario

Highway system
- Ontario provincial highways; Current; Former; 400-series
← Highway 49	→ Highway 58
Former provincial highways
Highway 51 →

King's Highway 50, commonly referred to as Highway 50, was a provincially maintained highway in the Canadian province of Ontario. The highway, which was decommissioned in 1998, is still referred to as Highway 50, though it is now made up of several county and regional roads: Peel Regional Road 50, York Regional Road 24 and Simcoe County Road 50. The route began in the north end corner of the former Etobicoke (today part of Toronto) at Highway 27 as Albion Road, and travelled northwest to Highway 89 west of the town of Alliston. En route, it passed through the villages of Bolton, Palgrave and Loretto. The road south of Bolton has become more suburban as development has encroached from the east and west; but despite this increased urbanization, the removal of highway status, and the fact that it runs through the former Albion Township, the Albion Road name has not been extended to follow it outside Toronto.

Highway 50 was designated in 1936, connecting the western terminus of Highway 49 with Bolton. One year later, it was extended both north and south to Highway 9 and Highway 7, respectively. In 1962, the route was extended south to Highway 27 in Toronto. A final extension was designated in 1976, extending the highway north to Highway 89. In 1997 and 1998, the entire route was transferred to regional governments, decommissioning the designation.

== Route description ==
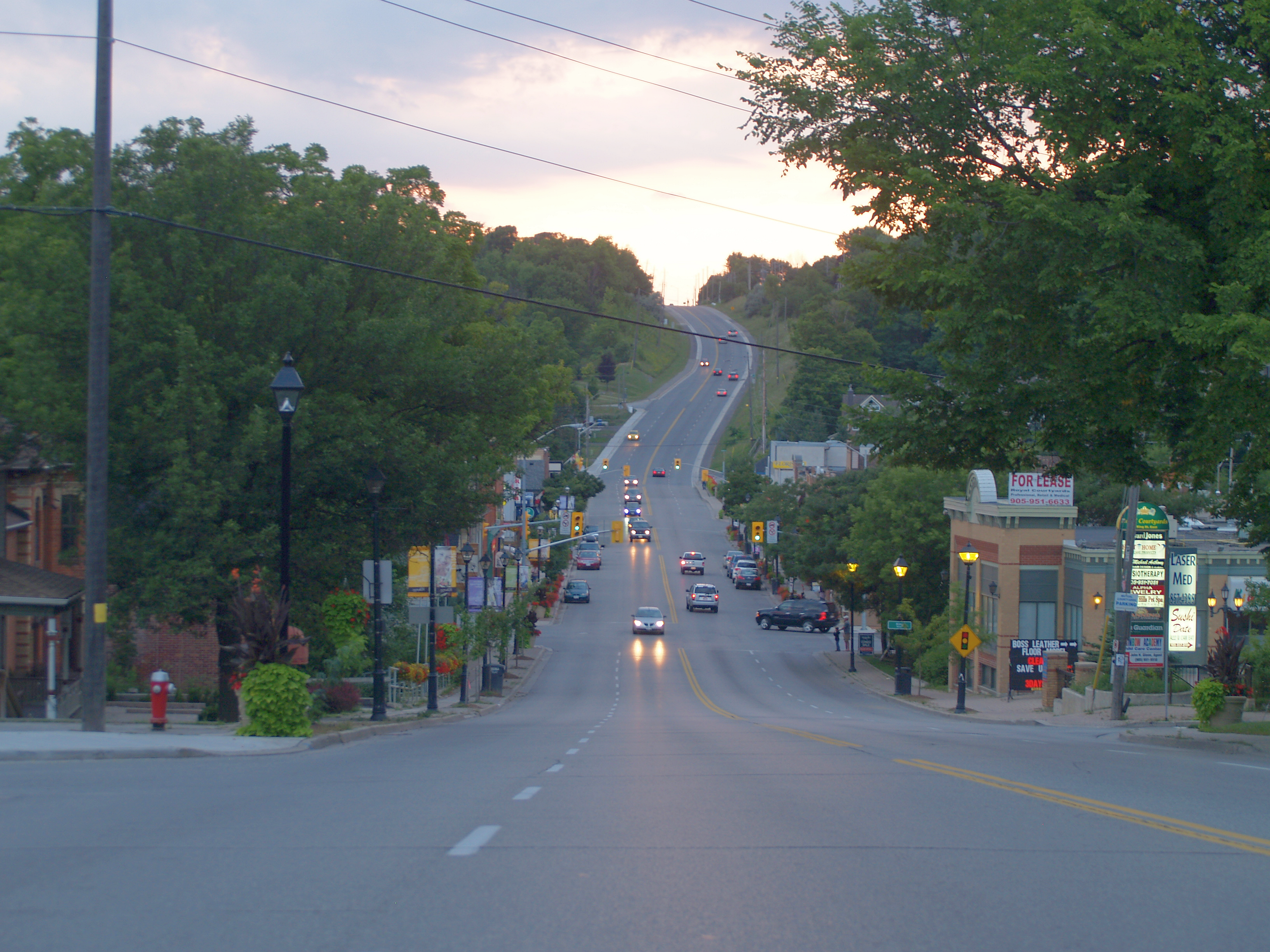
Highway 50 in Bolton

Highway 50 began at Highway 27 in Etobicoke, following Albion Road in a northwesterly direction. As far as Steeles Avenue, it was maintained as a connecting link with Metropolitan Toronto, bearing little resemblance to the rural highway north of the city.

The former route of Highway 50 begins as an urban arterial road; as the northwesternmost part of Albion Road. Unlike most other major roads in Toronto, it travels diagonally through the road grid. At Steeles, the road curves north and serves as the boundary between Brampton to the west and Vaughan to the east, in the regions of Peel and York, respectively, following an alignment that divides the concession road grids of both regional municipalities but follows neither. North of the former Highway 7 (named Queen Street on the Brampton side), the road passes to the east of the former hamlet of Ebenezer and then west of the Canadian Pacific Railway Vaughan Intermodal Facility, a large rail yard. At Mayfield Road (Peel Regional Road 14), which serves as the Brampton and Caledon boundary, the route curves northwest to align to the Peel regional road grid as it turns to run entirely within that region, and enters the village of Bolton, where it is named Queen Street.

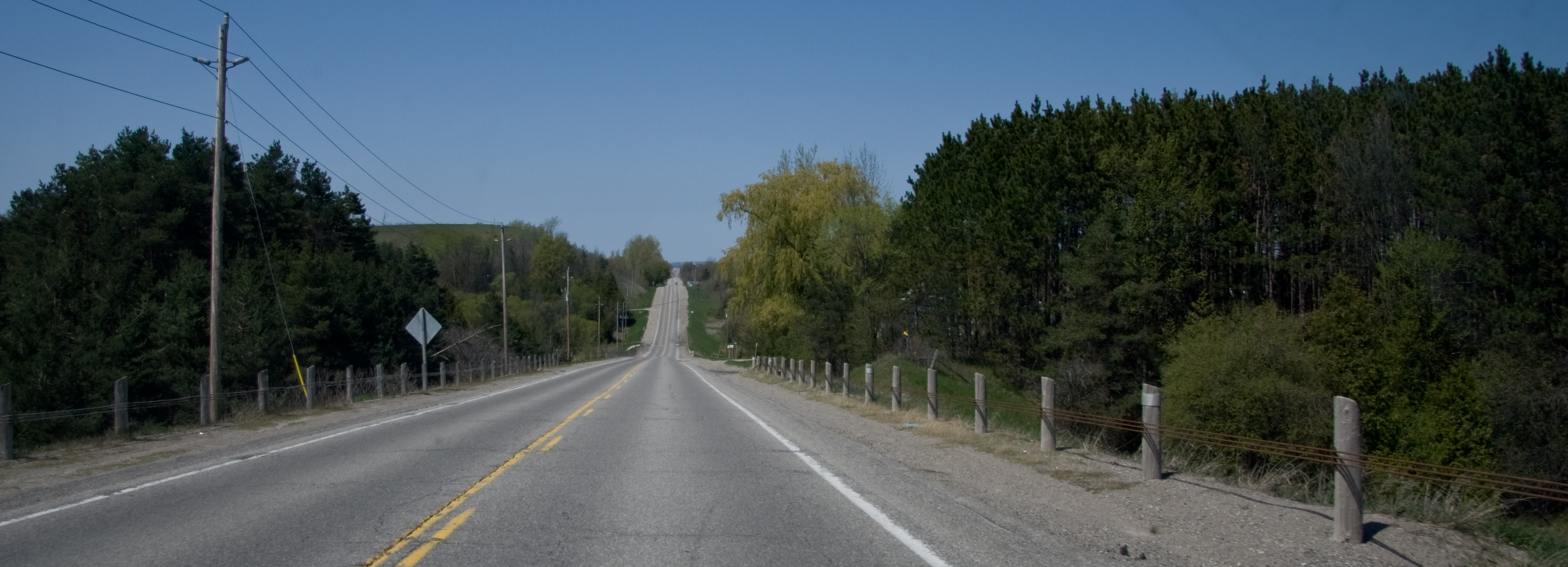
Highway 50 between Bolton and Alliston

North of Bolton, the road enters a rural stretch, where it divides two golf courses and provides access to Albion Hills Conservation Area. Shortly thereafter it enters the village of Palgrave, veering to the west to avoid a pond. North of Palgrave, the road is mostly rural, surrounded by open farmland; to the west is Palgrave Conservation Area. The road meets Highway 9 and curves northward, entering Simcoe County. It travels straight through the small hamlet of Loretto on its final leg northward. The former highway ends at Highway 89, west of Alliston, the location of a Honda Manufacturing plant.

== History ==
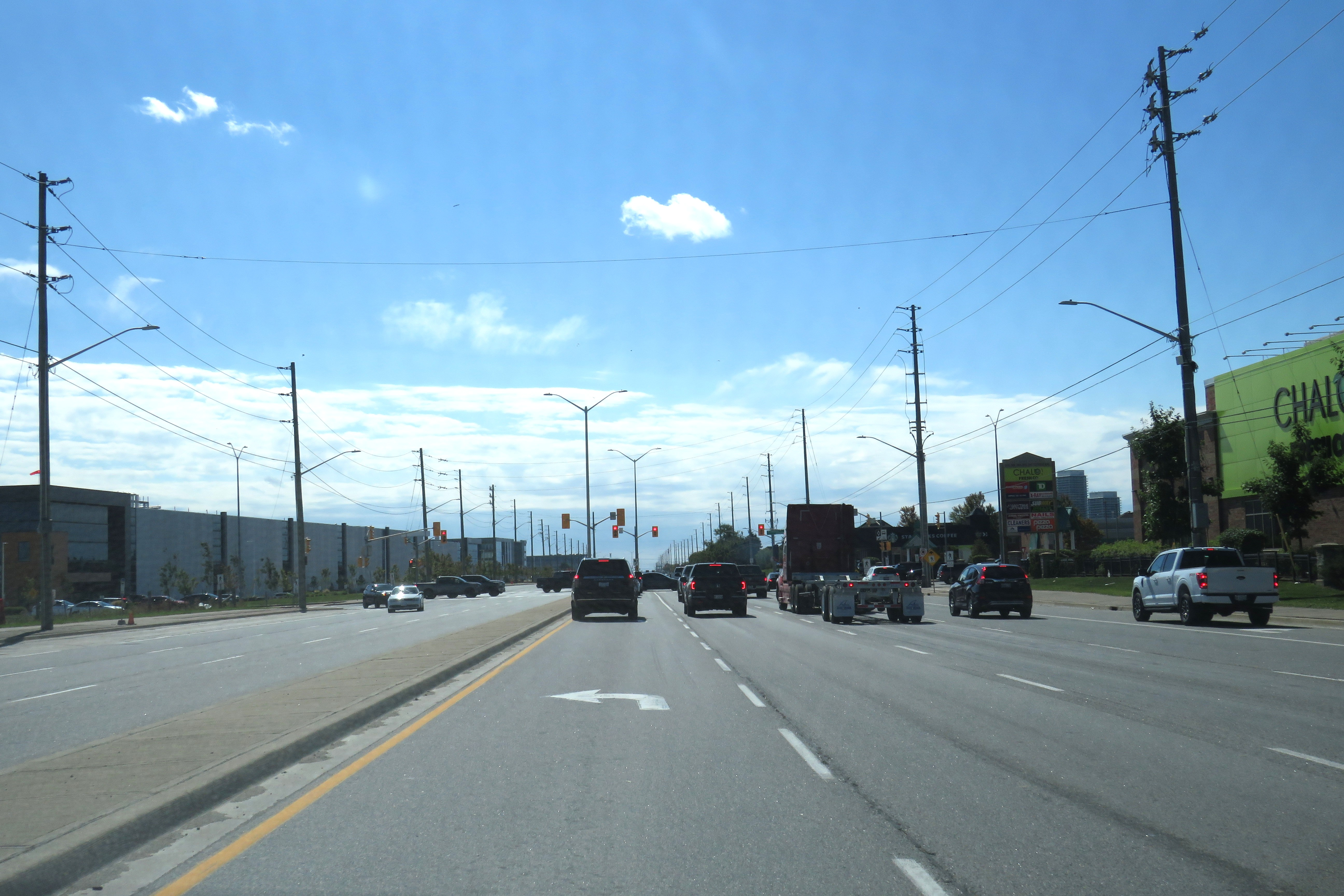
Now-urbanized section of former Highway 50 along the Brampton and Vaughan boundary

Highway 50 between Steeles Avenue and Bolton was originally part of a historic road named Indian Line, that continued the future highway's course south of the junction of Albion Road in Claireville, prior to the southern portion of Indian Line being rerouted and subsequently subsumed into Highway 427. It was first assumed by the Department of Highways as part of the King's Highway network in 1936, connecting Highway 49 with Bolton. On August 12, 1936, the 5.4-kilometre (3.4 mi) route was designated.

One year later, on August 11, 1937, the route was extended north to Highway 9. On October 6, it was extended south to Highway 7 along the York–Peel boundary.

Highway 50 was downloaded, a process that transfers responsibility for funding and maintenance of a highway to the various jurisdictions it passed through, beginning on April 1, 1997. On that day, the section between Steeles Avenue and Highway 7 was transferred to the joint jurisdiction of the Regional Municipalities of York and Peel, and the connecting link agreement with the Town of Caledon through downtown Bolton repealed. The road was designated Regional Road 24 on July 10, 1997, but renumbered as Regional Road 50 on March 26, 1998. York Region did not follow suit with this change, and so the road is still designated as Regional Road 24 by their Public Works Department, although they did not signpost it and the former highway is signed as Peel Road 50 only. The remaining section of Highway 50 north of Highway 7 was transferred to the regions of York and Peel and the County of Simcoe on January 1, 1998, decommissioning the designation entirely. A final transfer took place on August 13, 1998 between the Town of Caledon and Region of Peel, when the former connecting link through Bolton was assumed by Peel Region. Simcoe County has since designated its portion of the former highway as County Road 50.

== Major intersections ==
The following table lists the major junctions along Highway 50, as noted by the Ministry of Transportation of Ontario.

Division	Location	km	mi	Destinations	Notes
Metropolitan Toronto	Etobicoke	0.0	0.0	Highway 27 – Toronto (City Hall)	Highway 27 was downloaded in 1997 to Metro Toronto (now the amalgamated City of Toronto)
Metropolitan Toronto-Peel-York tripoint	Etobicoke-Brampton–Vaughan tripoint	2.7	1.7	Regional Road 15 (Steeles Avenue)	Northwest terminus of Albion Road
Peel-York boundary	Brampton–Vaughan boundary				
Peel-York boundary	Brampton–Vaughan boundary	3.7	2.3	Regional Road 8 (The Gore Road)	
Peel-York boundary	Brampton–Vaughan boundary	4.7	2.9	Highway 7 (Queen Street) – Brampton, Vaughan	Highway 7 was downloaded in 1997 to York and Peel Regions. Now York Regional Road 7 and Peel Regional Road 107.
Peel-York boundary	Brampton–Vaughan boundary	11.1	6.9	Coleraine Drive; Regional Road 25 (Major Mackenzie Drive)	
Peel-York boundary	Brampton–Vaughan boundary	13.0	8.1	Countryside Drive; Regional Road 49 (Nashville Road)	
Peel-York boundary	Caledon-Brampton-Vaughan tripoint	14.4	8.9	Regional Road 14 (Mayfield Road); Albion-Vaughan Road	
Peel	Caledon	19.3	12.0	Regional Road 9 (King Street)	
Peel	Caledon	26.8	16.7	Regional Road 22 (Old Church Road)	
Peel-Simcoe boundary	Caledon-New Tecumseth boundary	33.9	21.1	Highway 9 – Orangeville, Newmarket	
Simcoe	New Tecumseth				
Simcoe	New Tecumseth	43.2	26.8	County Road 1	
Simcoe	New Tecumseth	53.5	33.2	Highway 89 – Shelburne, Alliston	
1.000 mi = 1.609 km; 1.000 km = 0.621 mi: Closed/former
