= CPKC Vaughan Intermodal =

The CPKC Vaughan Intermodal facility is an intermodal rail-truck terminal serving the Greater Toronto Area from a property adjacent to the Canadian Pacific Kansas City transcontinental main line on the Mactier Subdivision in the community of Coleraine, Ontario in the City of Vaughan, Ontario.

Operated by CPKC Rail Intermodal Freight Systems, the facility opened in 1991 on 770 acres (3.1 km^{2}) along Peel Regional Road 50 between Rutherford Road and Major Mackenzie Drive. It underwent expansion in 2001 and handles 700,000 twenty-foot equivalent units (TEU) of cargo annually using four electric gantry cranes; it initially handled only 110,000 TEU annually.

Tenants on the site include:

- Fastfrate - relocated from CPKC West Toronto Yard
- Sears

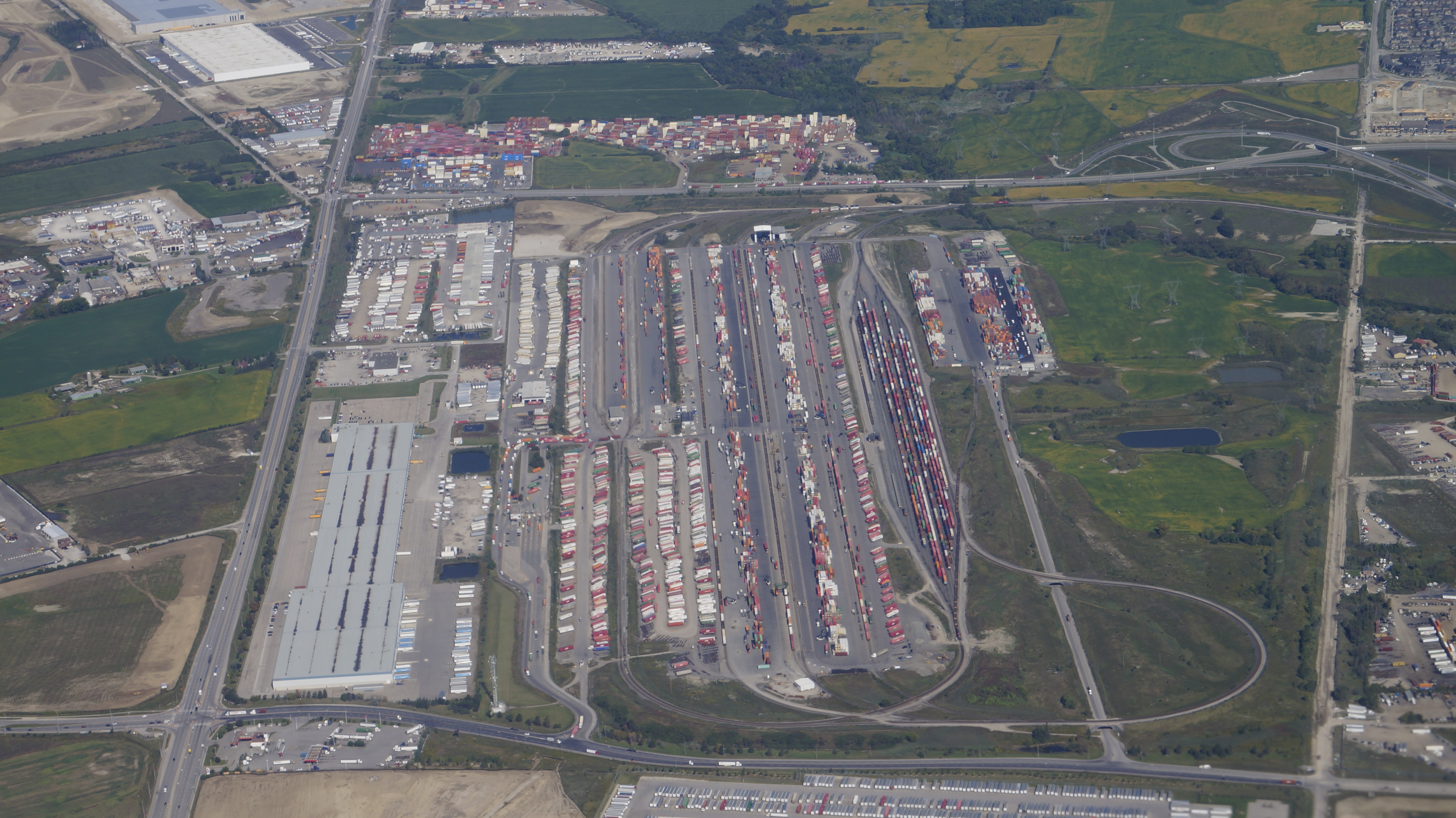
Aerial view of the facility west of Highway 427, looking northwest

== See also ==
- Canadian Pacific Kansas City
- Canadian Pacific Railway
