= Mackenzie Health =

Geography
- Location: Richmond Hill, York Region, Ontario, Canada

Organization
- Care system: Medicare
- Type: Community

Services
- Emergency department: Yes

History
- Opened: 1963

Links
- Website: https://www.mackenziehealth.ca/

Mackenzie Health is a hospital corporation based in Richmond Hill, Ontario, Canada that provides health care services in southern York Region. It operates two hospitals - Mackenzie Richmond Hill Hospital and Cortellucci Vaughan Hospital.

It also operates urgent care centres in Richmond Hill and Vaughan, and a mental health facility in Barrie.

== Facilities ==
- Mackenzie Richmond Hill Hospital, in Richmond Hill (opened as York Central Hospital in 1963)
- Cortellucci Vaughan Hospital, in Vaughan (opened in 2021)
- Oak Ridges Medical Centre, in Oak Ridges (northern Richmond Hill)
- Urgent Care Centre, in Vaughan (opened in 2006)
- Centre for Behavioural Health in Barrie

=== Management ===
In November 2015 Mackenzie Health signed an 18-year managed equipment services contract with Philips, for room design, diagnostics, alarm management, predictive analytics, and other medical technology services for Cortellucci Vaughan Hospital and Mackenzie Richmond Hill Hospital.

== Funding ==
The Mackenzie Health Foundation is the fundraising foundation for Mackenzie Health, responsible for obtaining donations from private donors. Established in 1977, it is responsible for acquiring the local funding for capital projects, for example the 10% of construction costs for the Cortellucci Vaughan Hospital, as well as all funding for other capital projects and ancillary operational costs. Capital projects funded include the acquisition of medical and diagnostic equipment, for example a magnetic resonance imaging scanner.

Donors can specify their donation to be allocated to a specific purpose.

The Mackenzie Health Volunteer Association is a community fundraising association that raises funds via community events, for example its annual dance held since 1993. The dance has raised over $500,000 since its inception, and has partially funded the acquisition of surgical equipment and a digital mammography unit, and the establishment of the Intensive Care Unit and the Neonatal Intensive Care Unit.
