= Deaths of the Neville-Lake children =

Drunk-driving incident in 2015 in Canada

- Left to right: Harrison, Milly, and Daniel Neville-Lake.
- Date: September 27, 2015; 11 years ago
- Location: Vaughan, Ontario, Canada; 43.870887°N 79.618666°W
- Cause: Blunt trauma; traffic collision
- Deaths: 4
- Injuries: 2
- Burial: Brampton Memorial Gardens; Brampton, Ontario, Canada

The deaths of the Neville-Lake children occurred on September 27, 2015, when Daniel, Harrison, and Milagros (Milly) Neville-Lake, and their grandfather, Gary Neville, were killed by a drunk driver, Marco Michael Muzzo, who sped through a stop sign and collided with their vehicle in Vaughan, Ontario. The incident and aftermath received significant media attention in Canada not only because of the young age of most of the victims, but also because of Muzzo's wealth and status.

== Incident ==
On September 26, 2015, Muzzo attended his bachelor party in Miami, Florida, and consumed alcohol until 3:00AM. Muzzo described drinking the most he has ever had in his life, but maintained he was aware and in control.

On the morning of September 27, 2015, Muzzo returned to Toronto by private jet. While on the jet, he continued to drink alcohol and is unsure how many drinks he consumed. Upon arriving at the Toronto Pearson International Airport, he decided to drive home as he felt he was not impaired. Muzzo admitted he did not consider alternatives such as a taxi or asking someone to pick him up. He would later admit knowing he was not sober, but decided to "take a chance" because he was confident he could drive.

Around 4:00PM on September 27, 2015, Vaughan Fire and Rescue responded to a report of a collision at the intersection of Kirby Road and Kipling Avenue. After arriving, first responders found a Jeep Grand Cherokee and a minivan in a T-bone collision. Upon investigation, they found that the minivan was carrying six family members. More than 30 first responders arrived to the scene. At one point, firefighters and paramedics were working to resuscitate four people at once.

First responders located the driver of the Jeep Grand Cherokee who was identified as 29-year-old Marco Michael Muzzo. Muzzo was travelling at a speed of 85 km/h (53 mph), had driven through a stop sign, and a test registered a blood alcohol content of 245 mgs/100 mL, nearly three times the legal limit and the range where falling into a coma is possible. He was immediately arrested. First responders described Muzzo as unsteady, holding on to other people for balance, had difficulty comprehending directions, and had urinated himself.

During the news reports of the accident, the children's mother, Jennifer Neville-Lake, learned about the crash via television when she saw a brief clip of the minivan. Police escorted her to the hospital where she identified the deceased. The four victims were:

- Daniel Neville-Lake, 9
- Harrison Neville-Lake, 5
- Milly Neville-Lake, 2
- Gary Neville, 65

The other passengers were the children's great-grandmother, Josephine Frias, and grandmother, Neriza Neville, who were seriously injured but survived.

== Trial ==
On September 28, 2015, Muzzo's Jeep ignited at the York Regional Police headquarters. The Jeep, which was seized for evidence, was investigated by the Central York Fire Services who found that the battery was located under the passenger side floor instead of under the hood, which they stated “wasn’t normal”. In the fire report, the official cause was listed as undetermined.

On February 4, 2016, Muzzo pleaded guilty to drunk driving causing the deaths of four. After his guilty plea, Muzzo was granted bail and released on $1-million recognizance until his sentencing hearing.

On March 29, 2016, Muzzo received a 10-year prison sentence, the longest sentence in Canadian history for an impaired driver without a prior record. Muzzo was also banned from driving for 12 years.

Muzzo was imprisoned at the Beaver Creek Institution as a minimum security offender.

== Aftermath ==
During the trial, Muzzo admitted to drinking and driving in the past. Muzzo also had a history of interactions with law enforcement. In 2012, Muzzo was arrested for being intoxicated in a public place after an altercation at a nightclub. After being denied entry into a club because of intoxication, Muzzo began fighting with the bouncers and threatened their lives. After he was arrested, Muzzo tried to kick out the back windows of the police car several times. He was not charged. Muzzo had been found guilty of speeding on 10 separate occasions and stated he would drive 20 km/h over the posted speed limit as a matter of habit. Muzzo also stated that fines for speeding did not change his driving behaviour.

Footage was found of Muzzo's mother, Dawn Muzzo, appearing on a reality television series, Come Dine with Me Canada, and boasting of her own reckless driving habits, explaining that she used to own a Porsche, "but I couldn't wear my heels, have a cigarette, and drink my coffee whilst shifting. So it had to be traded for an automatic".

On June 22, 2016, Kettle Lake Park in King Township received plaques and trees in honour of the three children and their grandfather.

On September 21, 2016, Muzzo and his family were sued for $22.5 million by the Neville-Lakes in a wrongful death civil lawsuit. The lawsuit named defendants including Muzzo's family's company, Ayrfield Holdings Limited operating as Marel Contractors.

In December 2016, Mothers Against Drunk Driving launched a campaign to "Fight Affluenza", stating that "drunk driving is unacceptable no matter how rich you are".

In November 2018, after two years of imprisonment, Muzzo applied for parole, which was subsequently denied for reasons including a lack of insight into his drinking habits and the risk they posed to others. The Parole Board of Canada stated that Muzzo intentionally failed to disclose information about his previous interactions with law enforcement, including his 2012 arrest, in an attempt to present himself as a "modest and responsible drinker who had simply made a terrible mistake on the day of the fatal collision".

In April 2020, after four years of imprisonment, Muzzo was granted day parole. He was then granted six more months of day parole in November 2020.

In February 2021, after nearly 5 years of imprisonment, Muzzo was released and granted full parole. Muzzo's full parole came with several conditions, including barring him from entering Brampton and York Region. He was also forbidden from any contact with the victims' families and barred from drinking alcohol or visiting drinking establishments. The parole board believed there were legitimate concerns regarding the potential for unintended victim contact.

=== Petition to remove Muzzo name ===
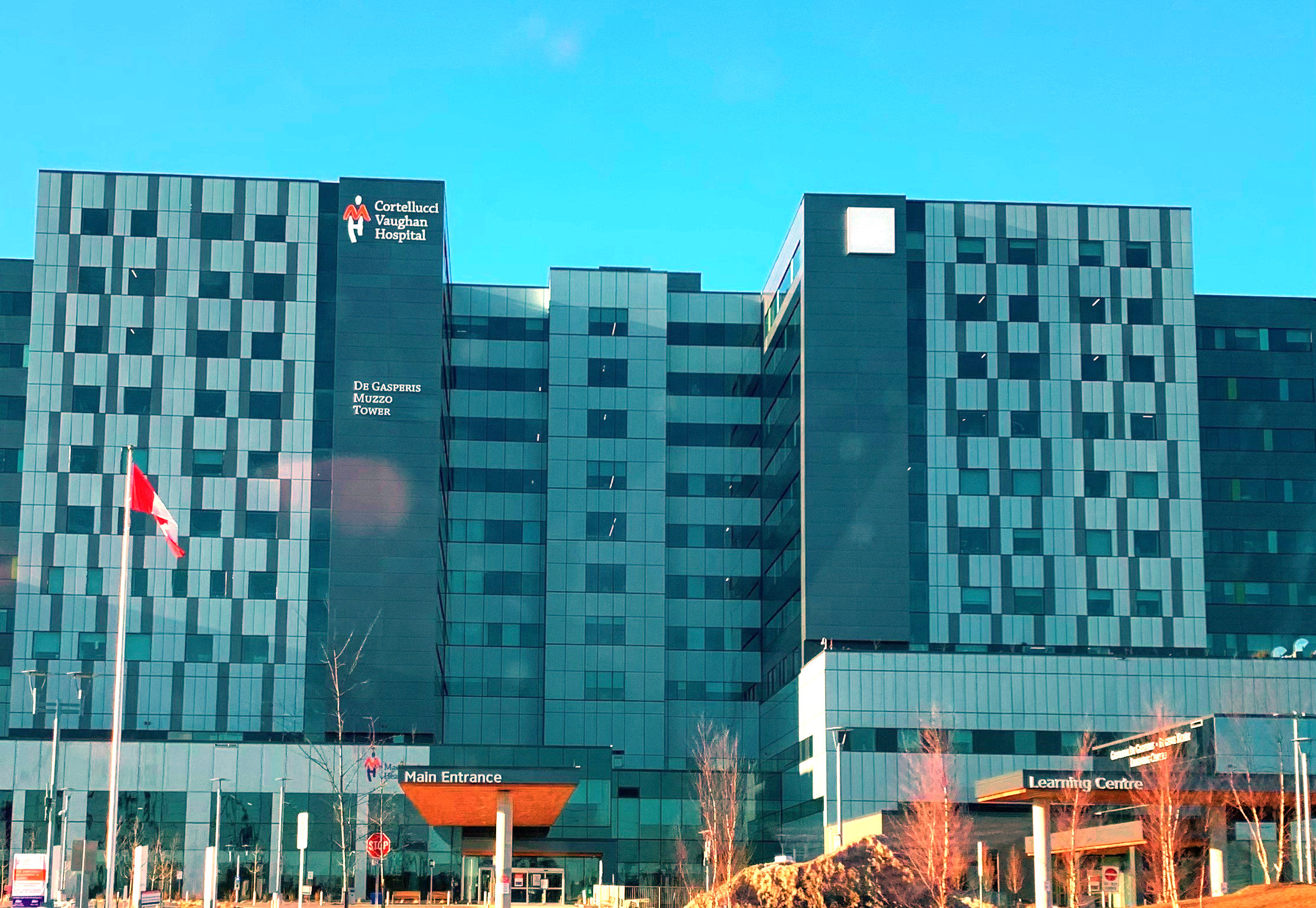
Cortellucci Vaughan Hospital, which features a tower bearing the Muzzo family name and offers mental health services.

After Muzzo's release, a petition was launched to remove Muzzo's name and pictures from various organizations, including the University of Toronto, which has the Muzzo Family Alumni Hall, Cortellucci Vaughan Hospital, and the Hospital for Sick Children. Muzzo's family, which had an estimated wealth of $1.8 billion, provided donations to these organizations. The petition accumulated more than 3,000 signatures in less than 24 hours, but all the organizations refused to remove any references to Muzzo's name or his picture.

In Mississauga, Marco Muzzo Memorial Woods was renamed to Marco Muzzo Sr. Memorial Woods, in order to clarify that it was a tribute to Muzzo's grandfather, Marco Muzzo Sr.

=== Death of Edward Lake ===
The day after Father's Day on June 20, 2022, the children's father, Edward Lake, was found deceased at his home, with his death ruled a suicide.

The preceding day, police officers interacted with Lake at his home to investigate an altercation. Police arrived and became involved in a separate altercation with Lake, resulting in a taser being deployed. Lake was arrested and charged with one count of assault. Lake was later taken to the hospital, where he was assessed and released.

Lake had said in a statement at Muzzo's sentencing that he had suffered from suicidal thoughts and anxiety since the crash.

After Lake's death, there were renewed calls for organizations which had received donations from Muzzo's family to remove the name from their facilities. All organizations again refused.
