= Major Mackenzie West Terminal =

Bus station in Vaughan, Ontario

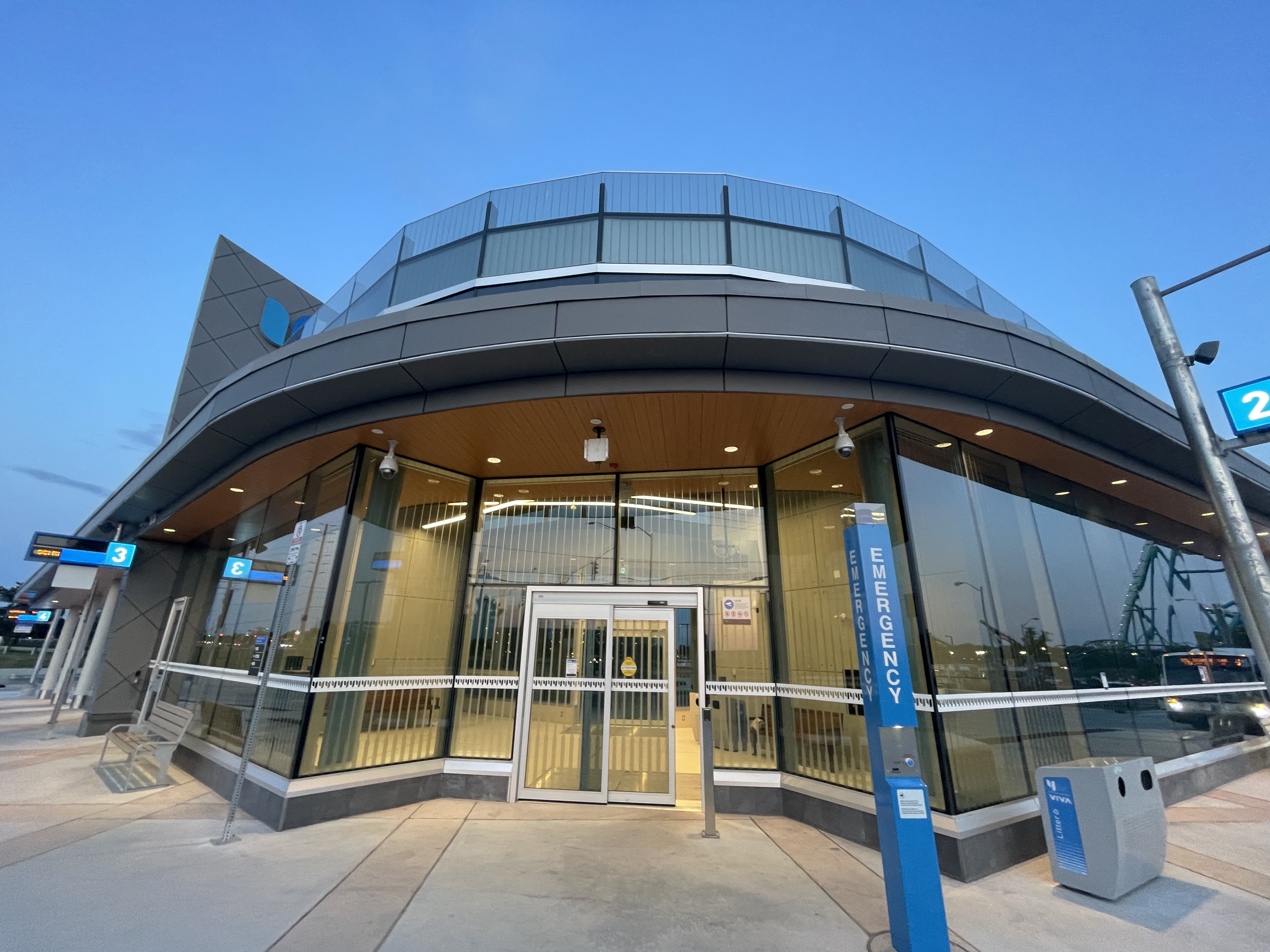

General information
- Location: Major Mackenzie Drive West, Vaughan, Ontario; Canada
- Coordinates: 43°50′51″N 79°32′30″W
- Owner: Regional Municipality of York
- Operator: York Region Transit
- Bus routes: YRT buses: 4 Major Mackenzie; 6 Major Mackenzie; 20 Jane; 165 Weston; 320 Jane Express; 360 Vaughan Mills/Wonderland
- Bus stands: 12

Construction
- Accessible: Yes

History
- Opening: November 6, 2022 (partial); April 30, 2023 (full)
Location
Location

Major Mackenzie West Terminal is a York Region Transit local bus terminal in Vaughan, Ontario, Canada. It is located on Major Mackenzie Drive immediately north of Canada's Wonderland and immediately south of Cortellucci Vaughan Hospital just west of Jane Street. The terminal partially opened on November 6, 2022, and fully opened on April 30, 2023. It includes a passenger pick-up and drop-off area and a pedestrian underpass connection to Cortellucci Vaughan Hospital under Major Mackenzie. It has 12 bus platforms.

== Bus service ==
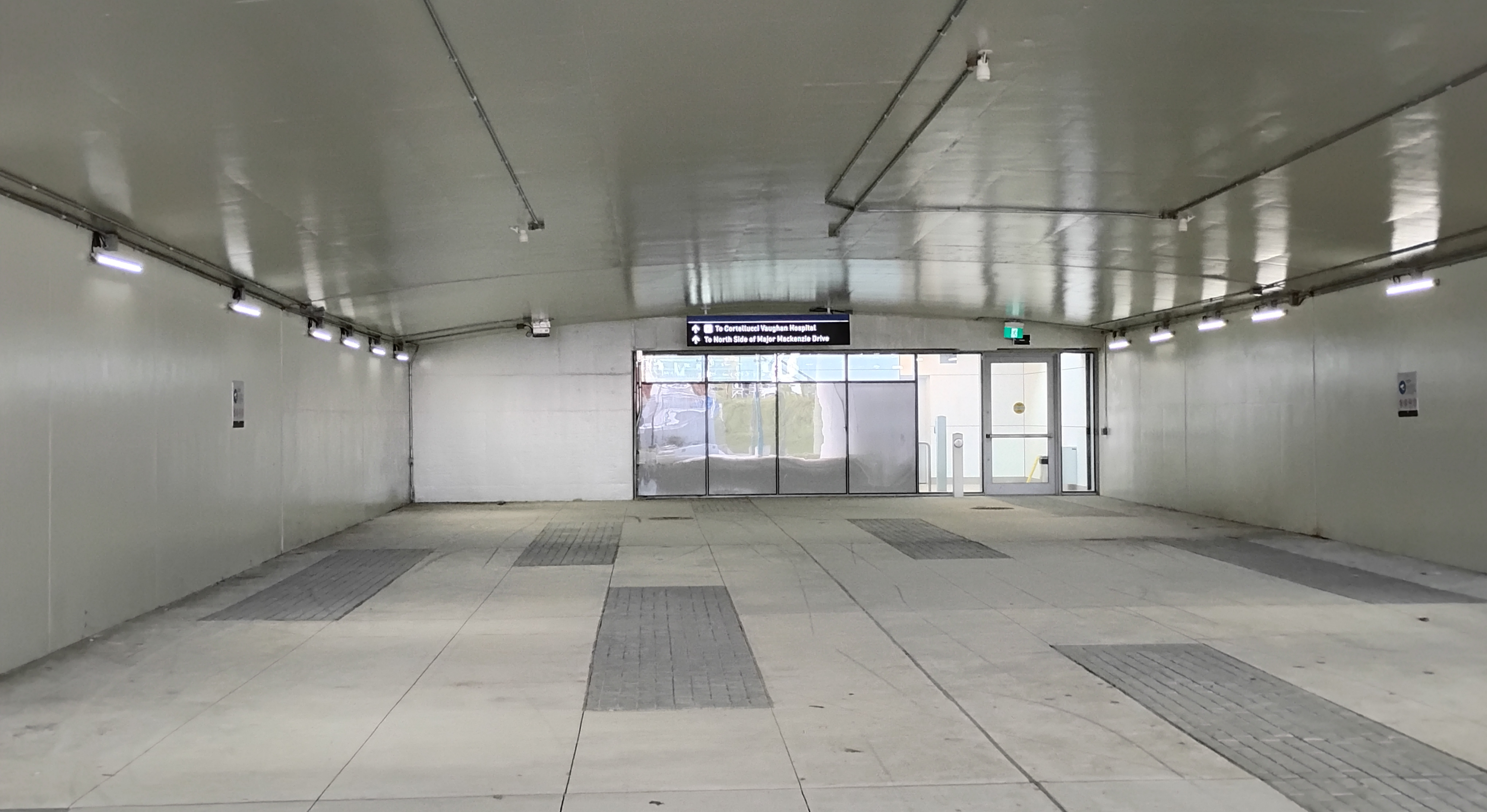
Walkway under Major Mackenzie connecting to the Cortellucci Vaughan Hospital from the terminal

=== Platform assignments ===
Walkthrough of the terminal

All routes are YRT.

- Platform 1: 6 Major Mackenzie
- Platform 2: Mobility On-Request
- Platform 3: 165 Weston
- Platform 4: 20 Jane northbound
- Platform 5: Spare
- Platform 6: 4 Major Mackenzie
- Platform 7: 20 Jane southbound
- Platform 8: 320 Jane Express
- Platform 9: GO Transit
- Platform 10: Spare
- Platform 11: 360 Vaughan Mills/Wonderland
- Platform 12: GO Transit
