= Ontario Highway 427 =

Controlled-access highway in Ontario

Highway 427
- Highway 427 highlighted in red

Route information
- Maintained by Ministry of Transportation of Ontario
- Length: 27 km (17 mi)
- Existed: December 4, 1971–present

Major junctions
- South end: Queen Elizabeth Way / Gardiner Expressway – Toronto; Continues as Brown's Line; however, according to the King's Highway Website, the south end is Evans Avenue.
- Highway 401 – Toronto; Highway 409 – Toronto/Mississauga; 407 ETR – Vaughan
- North end: Regional Road 25 (Major Mackenzie Drive) – Vaughan

Location
- Country: Canada
- Province: Ontario

Highway system
- Ontario provincial highways; Current; Former; 400-series
← Highway 420	→ Queen Elizabeth Way

King's Highway 427 (pronounced "four twenty-seven"), also known as Highway 427 and colloquially as the 427, is a 400-series highway in the Canadian province of Ontario that runs from the Queen Elizabeth Way (QEW) and Gardiner Expressway in Toronto to Major Mackenzie Drive (York Regional Road 25) in Vaughan, near the hydro towers. It is Ontario's second busiest freeway by volume and the third busiest in North America, after Highway 401 in Ontario and Interstate 405 in California. Like Highway 401, a portion of the route is divided into a collector–express system with twelve to fourteen continuous lanes. Notable about Highway 427 are its several multi-level interchanges; the junctions with the QEW/Gardiner Expressway and Highway 401 are two of the largest interchanges in Toronto (and Ontario) and were constructed between 1967 and 1971, while the interchanges with Highway 409 (Toronto) and Highway 407 (Vaughan) were completed in 1992 and 1995, respectively.

Highway 427 is one of two complete north-south freeways in Toronto, the only other one being Highway 404/Don Valley Parkway (DVP) serving North York and Scarborough. Highway 427 serves as a major traffic route for the western portion of Toronto (Etobicoke), the northeastern portion of Mississauga (Malton), the southeastern portion of Brampton (Claireville), and the western portion of Vaughan (Woodbridge). The section of Highway 427 between Highway 401 and Dundas Street (Highway 5) is a heavily traversed transit corridor; the 1.61-kilometre (1.00 mi) stretch between Burnhamthorpe Road and Rathburn Road saw an average of over 400,000 vehicles and over 5,000 buses per day in 2016, including express buses from GO Transit, MiWay, and the Toronto Transit Commission (TTC). The freeway is also the main feeder to Toronto Pearson International Airport from the north and south, as a considerable amount of traffic from Highway 401 (eastbound), the QEW/Gardiner Expressway, and Highway 407 make use of the route for airport access.

First designated in 1972, Highway 427 assumed the recently completed, 12-lane, collector-express freeway of Highway 27, as well as a short freeway north of Highway 401 known as the Airport Expressway. Both routes were upgraded throughout the 1950s and 1960s, eventually becoming intertwined into the present configuration in 1972. The freeway was extended north from Pearson Airport to Highway 7 over the following twenty years. Construction of an extension north to York Regional Road 25 (Major Mackenzie Drive) began in May 2017 and was opened on September 18, 2021.

The speed limit is 100 km/h (62 mph). The route is patrolled by the Ontario Provincial Police (OPP) and maintained by the Ministry of Transportation of Ontario (MTO).

== Route description ==
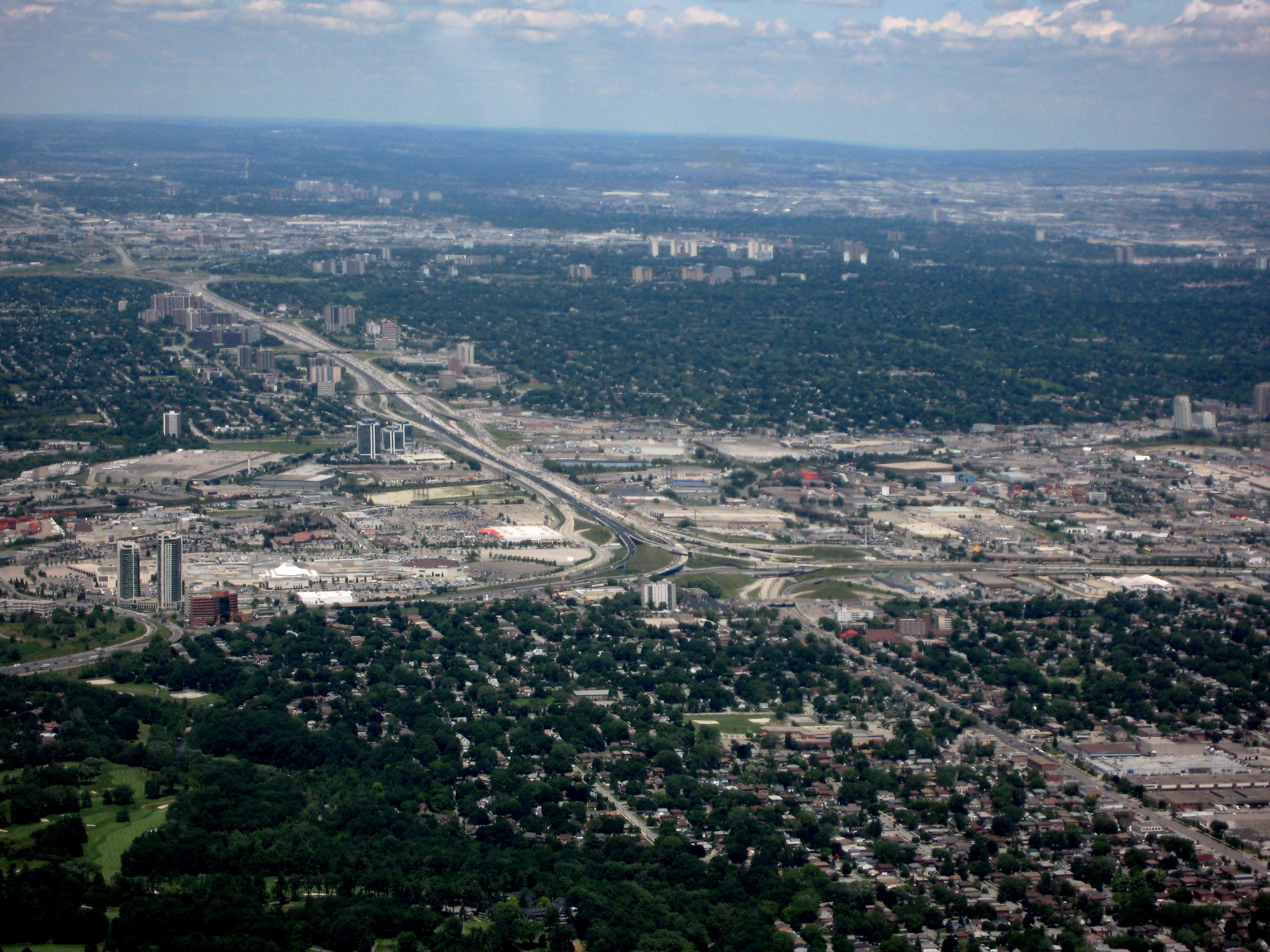
Highway 427 begins at a complicated interchange with the Queen Elizabeth Way (QEW) and Gardiner Expressway.

Highway 427 is the second-busiest freeway in Canada with an average of 300,000 vehicles that use it between the QEW and Highway 401 per day. The section between Burnhamthorpe Road and Rathburn Road (south of Highway 401) has an annual average daily traffic (AADT) count of 353,100 vehicles. The route was 19.9 km (12.4 mi) long from 1991 until 2021, when the latest extension increases its length to approximately 17 miles (27 km).

At its southern terminus, the highway begins at Coules Court, where it continues as Brown's Line, once the southernmost stretch of Highway 27. Alderwood Plaza, located on the east side of the route, has a parking lot which provides access to the highway; this is the only at-grade access along the length of the route. The four-lane arterial road splits into a divided highway, then descends below Evans Avenue, where a northbound exit ramp to the latter allows indirect access to the Hamilton-bound QEW at the intersection with The West Mall (TWM), plus there are also connecting ramps to the highway north of Evans Avenue. The highway then weaves through a complicated, semi-directional T interchange, providing northbound access to Evans Avenue and the Gardiner Expressway, and southbound access to The Queensway, the QEW/Gardiner Expressway, and Evans Avenue. North of that massive interchange, the lanes from Brown's Line diverge and form the collector lanes of a collector-express system. Flyover ramps to and from the QEW/Gardiner pass over the southbound lanes and converge to form the express lanes. This collector-express system serves to divide local traffic from freeway-to-freeway traffic; the express lanes provide access between the QEW/Gardiner Expressway and Highway 401, while the collector lanes provide local access between those interchanges.

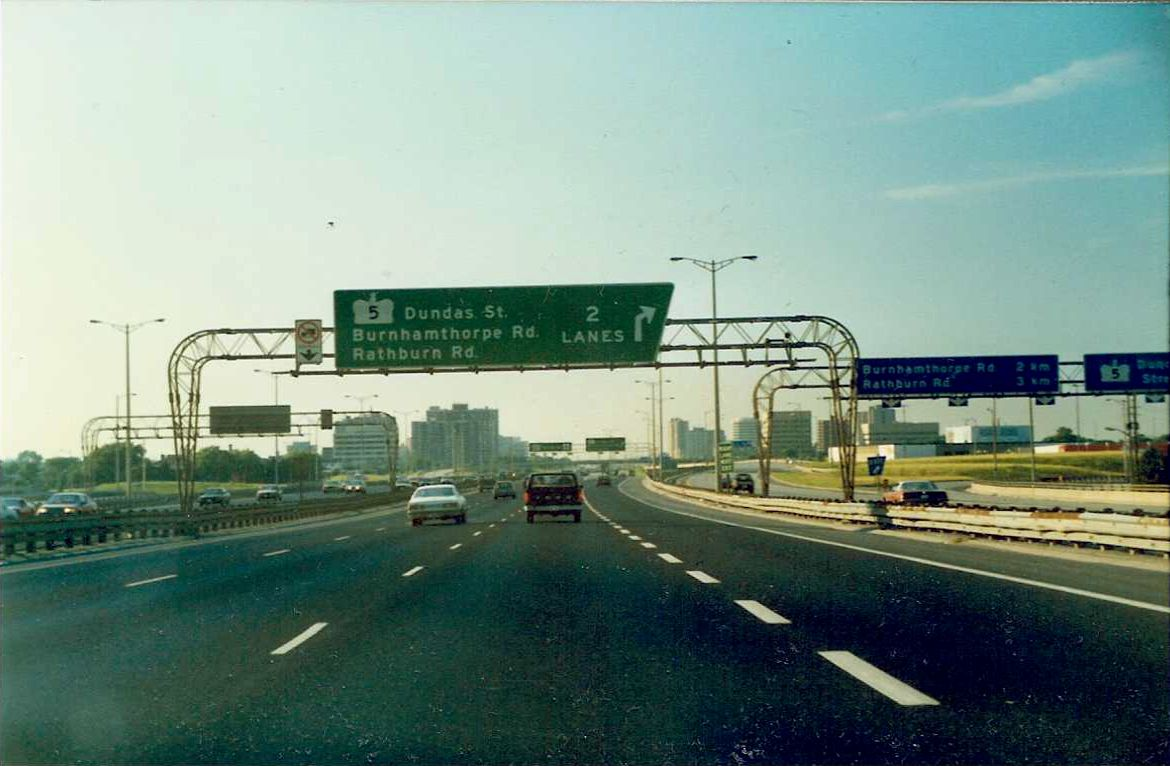
Northbound express lanes approaching Dundas Street (formerly Highway 5) and "Basketweave" transfer, circa 1989.

South of Eglinton Avenue, Highway 427's northbound and southbound express lanes split to interchange with Highway 401, while the collector lanes split off to become Highway 27.

After crossing Canadian Pacific Railway (CPR) tracks, the highway interchanges with Dundas Street (formerly Highway 5). A set of criss-crossing ramps provide access between the collector and express lanes north of this point, referred to as "The Basketweave", with the northbound express-to-collector transfer also having an offramp to The East Mall (TEM) and Dundas Street. North of Dundas, Highway 427 has a northbound right-in/right-out (RIRO) interchange with Gibbs Road, the first of several that provide collector lane access to minor streets that mostly connect to The East Mall and The West Mall, which run parallel with the collector-express section of the highway. The highway passes beneath Bloor Street, then a full Parclo A4 interchange is provided shortly after with Burnhamthorpe Road, southwest of Burnhamthorpe Collegiate Institute. Across from the school, another RIRO provides access from the southbound lanes to Holiday Drive and The West Mall (which terminates). Following the off-ramp, to the north, is a half-cloverleaf interchange with Rathburn Road, which provides access from the northbound lanes and to the southbound lanes.

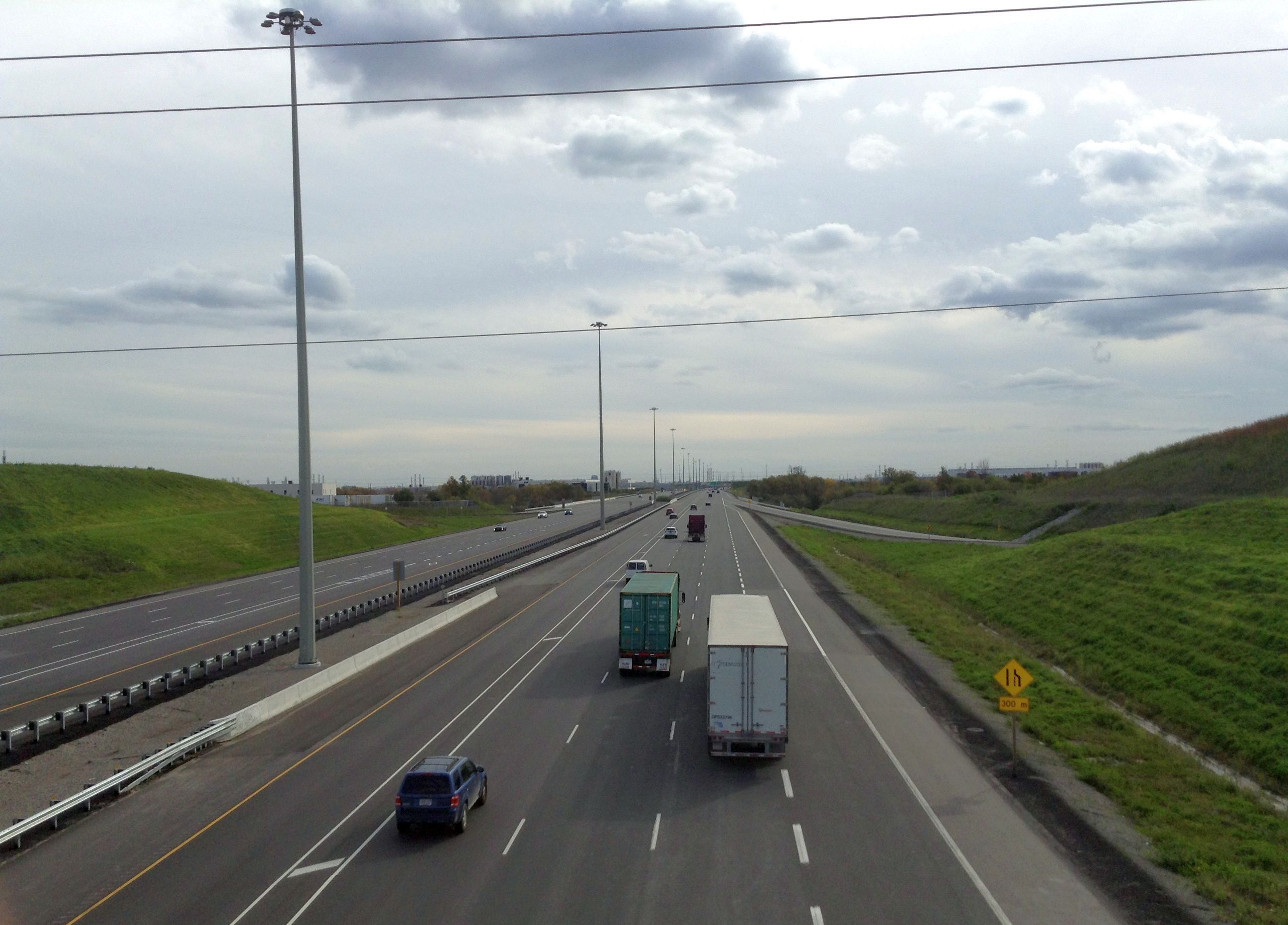
Extension of Highway 427 looking south from Langstaff Road, in Vaughan.

Transfers provide a second and final opportunity to cross between the express and collector lanes (or vice versa), south of the complicated, 1.56-square-kilometre (0.60 sq mi) Highway 401 spaghetti interchange. A final RIRO provides southbound access to and from Eringate Drive, after which the collector lanes diverge, and the express lanes cross the southbound collectors. The collector lanes cross Eglinton Avenue at a half-cloverleaf interchange and then dives under Highway 401 while transitioning into Highway 27, while the express lanes interchange with Highway 401 and continue the route of Highway 427. The Highway 427 express lanes, along with ramps connecting to Highway 401, are constructed around the Richview Memorial Cemetery. Highway 427 passes through the sprawling Highway 401 Interchange and becomes displaced approximately one kilometre (0.62 mi) to the west. There are no ramps to provide access from southbound Highway 427 to eastbound Highway 401 (and vice versa), as this connection is handled by Highway 409.

Highway 427 crosses Renforth Drive, then curves to the east of Runways 24R and 24L of Toronto Pearson International Airport. Shortly thereafter, the freeway narrows to eight lanes before it crosses Dixon Road and Airport Road (Peel Regional Road 7), between which the freeway forms the demarcation line. At the Dixon Road partial interchange, which only serves the freeway south of this junction, another ramp branches off and passes under the highway, providing access to Pearson Airport. From here to just south of Finch Avenue, the freeway follows the boundary line between Toronto and Mississauga. The freeway encounters the third multi-level junction along its length, a cloverstack with Highway 409, which provides access to the airport for the freeway west of this junction. This interchange also provides the southbound movement to eastbound movement to Highway 401, via a flyover ramp to Highway 409, that cannot be performed at the larger interchange with Highway 401 to the south. There is no movement from northbound to westbound at the interchange with Highway 409, since airport access is already provided at the Dixon Road exit to the south. Highway 427 continues straight north and narrows again to six lanes.

After crossing the GO Transit Kitchener Line, it passes west of Woodbine Racetrack and interchanges with Rexdale Boulevard/Derry Road and Finch Avenue (Peel Regional Roads 5 and 2). The freeway bends slightly eastward, diverging from the Toronto–Mississauga boundary to briefly run exclusively through Toronto again. It crosses the West Humber River where it drains from the Claireville Reservoir. The highway crosses Steeles Avenue and enters Vaughan, as it approaches a fourth and final sprawling interchange with Highway 407 Express Toll Route, then passes beneath a hydro corridor. Highway 427 then interchanges with Highway 7 (York Regional Road 7), Langstaff Road (York Regional Road 72), and Rutherford Road (York Regional Road 73), and finally ends at a trumpet interchange with Major MacKenzie Drive (York Regional Road 25). At a trumpet interchange, the northbound exit ramp from the freeway defaults into Garnet Williams Way, a local side street.

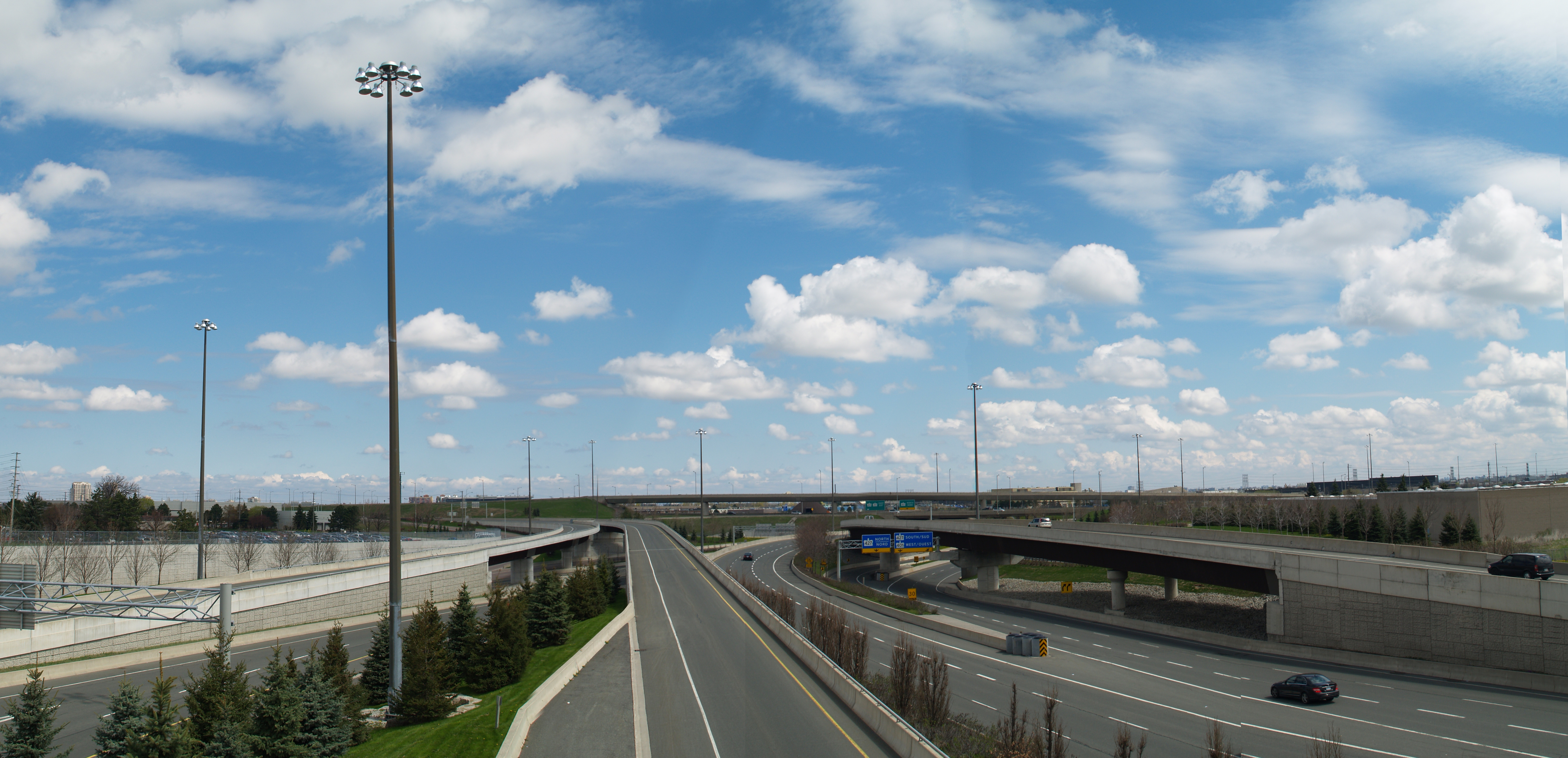
Highway 427 and Highway 409 interchange, as seen from the Network Road overpass.

== History ==
=== QEW to Highway 401 (1953–1956) ===
Although Highway 427 was not officially designated until 1972, several sections of freeway were already in place prior to that date. The designation was applied following the completion of the interchanges at the QEW and Highway 401 as well as the expansion of the section between them into a collector-express system.

Highway 27 was designated as a two-lane road travelling north from Highway 2 (Lake Shore Boulevard) towards Barrie. As Toronto grew outwards following the annexation of various municipalities, the Ontario Department of Highways (DHO) began planning for a bypass of the city, aptly named the Toronto Bypass. A significant portion of this bypass was designed to be incorporated into the Transprovincial Highway, now Highway 401. The remainder was designed to follow the existing right-of-way of Highway 27 between the QEW and Richview Sideroad (now Eglinton Avenue).

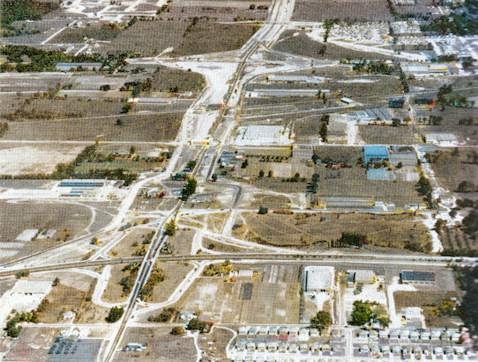
An aerial view, facing north, of the reconstruction of Highway 27 to a four-lane freeway during the early 1950s, including a cloverleaf interchange with the QEW.

Construction of the Toronto Bypass began near Yonge Street in 1949 (along present-day Highway 401) and on the four-laning of Highway 27 in 1953. The Highway 27 work involved the construction of two interchanges: a three-way interchange at Highway 401 and a large cloverleaf at the QEW, the latter of which would become one of the worst bottlenecks in the province a decade after its completion, according to Minister of Transportation Charles MacNaughton. By September 1956, it was possible to bypass Toronto entirely on the four lane divided highway composed of Highway 401 and Highway 27. Highway 401 was extended to the west soon after, but Highway 27 remained a two-lane highway north of it.

Completed grading on the reconstruction of Highway 27 in 1954; the Highway 401 overpass is visible in the background

=== Airport Expressway (1964–1971) ===
An aerial photograph of the Airport Expressway in 1964

During the early 1960s, Toronto International Airport was expanded with the construction of the Aeroquay One terminal. To serve the expected demand of the airport expansion, the DHO built a new four-lane freeway known as the Toronto Airport Expressway which opened on January 3, 1964. This new route ran north from Highway 401 at Renforth Drive to Dixon/Airport Roads (roughly followed the same alignment as today's Highway 427) where it tied in with and downgraded into Indian Line. The Airport Expressway featured a connection with the western terminus of Richview Sideroad at the southern end of the interchange with Highway 401 as well as an interchange with Renforth Drive. On Highway 401 the Airport Expressway interchange was located 1 kilometre (0.62 mi) to the west on the existing interchange with Highway 27.

=== Expansion (1963–1971) ===
In 1963, MacNaughton announced that Highway 401 would be widened from a four-lane highway to a collector-express system, modeled after the Dan Ryan Expressway in Chicago. Plans were soon developed to apply this model to the QEW between Highway 27 and Royal York Road and to Highway 27 between the QEW and Highway 401, and were unveiled to Etobicoke council on October 13, 1966. Design work followed and was completed by May 1967. The widening of Highway 27 required the demolition and rebuilding of overpasses at Bloor Street, Burnhamthorpe Road, and Rathburn Road constructed just over a decade earlier. The rest of the route was rebuilt by September 1968, the next stage involved the reconstruction of the interchanges with QEW and Highway 401 which were reconfigured into complicated multi-level interchanges to permit free-flow movement.

Replacing a cloverleaf, the new interchange with the QEW was built over 48.5 ha (120 acres) and required the construction of 19 bridges and the equivalent of 42 km (26 mi) of two-lane roadway. The project involved the temporary diversion of QEW traffic to an overpass that would eventually be used for The Queensway. Construction began in September 1968, although preliminary work had been ongoing since 1966; the interchange opened to traffic on November 14, 1969.

A diagram superimposing the old Airport Expressway and the current Highway 401–427 interchange

The existing Airport Expressway was removed in its entirety, as the DHO deemed it insufficient for future expansion beyond an airport access road, but its replacement in the form of the Highway 427 extension (also known as the Airport Expressway until 1980) still followed roughly the same alignment. Like the former Airport Expressway, the extension included direct access to the airport and Dixon/Airport Roads, north of which at a temporary terminus it defaulted to Indian Line.

Highway 401's new junction with Highway 27 remains the largest interchange in Canada as it sprawls over 156 ha (385 acres) and required the construction of 28 bridges and the equivalent of 46.6 km (29 mi) of two-lane roadway, being built around the existing Richview Memorial Cemetery. On Highway 401 this required the removal of the existing interchange with Highway 27 as well as the half-cloverleaf interchange with the Airport Expressway which was 1 km (0.62 mi) to the west as both were originally conceived as separate routes. These two separate interchanges were replaced with a single large junction, where north of Highway 401 the collector lanes would continue the Highway 27 routing while the express lanes would shift westward to meet the rebuilt Airport Expressway. The reconstructed interchange also including connections to Eglinton Avenue (ultimately meant for the proposed but never-built municipal Richview Expressway) from all directions except for Highway 401 east of that interchange, while Carlingview Drive received ramps to Highway 401 east of that interchange. While the new interchange with the QEW was opened to traffic on November 14, 1969, the more complex Highway 401 junction required several more years of construction staging, fully opening on December 4, 1971 (though portions were opened in the weeks prior to that). On that same date, Highway 427 was inaugurated as it assumed the collector-express portion of Highway 27 and the new Airport Expressway. North of Highway 401, while the existing Highway 27 remained a provincial route as it transitioned from an expressway to an arterial road, the parallel section of Highway 427 effectively served as a freeway bypass.

=== Extensions beyond Highway 401 (1976–1994) ===
At the recently opened interchange between Highway 401 and Highway 427, the off-ramp from westbound Highway 401 to Carlingview Drive was temporarily signed as "Airport Expressway", since Carlingview Drive had a temporary on-ramp to northbound Highway 427 near the Renforth Drive underpass but that on-ramp was closed in the early 1970s. Direct access from westbound Highway 401 to northbound Highway 427 would be restored a few years later once Highway 409 opened, which had greater capacity then the short-lived Carlingview ramps.

Ultimately, it was planned to extend Highway 427 north along Indian Line (although a 680-metre (2,230 ft) stretch of that road would be retained to maintain access to driveways) most of the way to the future Highway 407, where ramps would direct northbound traffic onto Highway 27, although this connection was never built. An extension north of Dixon/Airport Roads began in 1976 as part of the work to build Highway 409, and it included the construction of the interchange between the two freeways, which was completed by the beginning of 1980. Construction was progressing on the section north to Rexdale Boulevard, which opened by the end of the year. From 1981-82 a new underpass at Dixon Road was built to carry northbound traffic, then the existing underpass for Dixon Road which formerly carried both directions of the Airport Expressway was rehabilitated and reopened to carry southbound traffic. In 1982, construction began on the next section of Highway 427, extending it to south of Albion Road (then Highway 50), with traffic defaulting onto the two-lane Indian Line to reach Albion. This project included an interchange with a new Finch Avenue extension west from Humberline Drive to Steeles Avenue, which was completed in late 1984.

Highway 427 was extended north to Highway 7 in Vaughan beginning with the construction of the Parclo interchange between the two in 1988. The extension followed a new alignment since this has sufficient right-of-way for future expansion and a junction with the initial phase of Highway 407, as opposed to upgrading Indian Line and incorporating it into the freeway. The extension opened in late 1991. The bypassed remnant of Indian Line ending at Albion Road was then closed off to regular vehicular traffic, though it is still used for utility vehicle access to a natural gas facility.

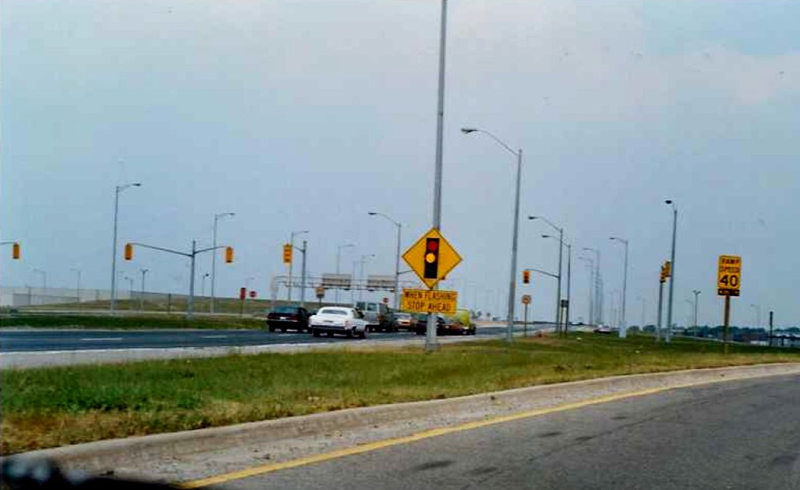
The junction of Highways 427 and 409 in 1989, featuring an at-grade signalized intersection to allow traffic on southbound Highway 427 to access eastbound Highway 409. A flyover ramp replaced this intersection in 1992.

The final at-grade intersections were removed in the early 1990s, the first being the signalized left turn from the southbound lanes with eastbound Highway 409 which was replaced by a flyover ramp in 1992, and the second being at Morning Star Drive where an overpass was constructed in 1994 to extend the street across the freeway to Humberwood Boulevard, making Highway 427 a fully controlled-access freeway for its entire length.

Work on the interchange with Highway 407 proceeded in stages, starting with (as part of the 427 extension project itself) the underpasses for Highway 407 as well as the fourth-level flyover ramp from westbound Highway 407 to Highway 427 southbound prior to 1991, following by the third-level flyover ramp from Highway 427 northbound to Highway 407 westbound, with the interchange being put into service when Highway 407 opened in 1997.

=== Upgrades since 1990s ===
In the late-1990s, at the interchange with Highway 401, the underused left-hand exit for Eglinton Avenue was narrowed from two lanes to one lane, in order to provide an additional lane for Highway 427 southbound, although this extra lane ends shortly before the underpass with Highway 401.

In 2001-02, modifications were made to the interchange with the QEW and Gardiner Expressway. This included a new loop ramp from the Highway 427 southbound collectors to the Gardiner, aimed at relieving the congestion in the express lanes created by the southbound collector-to-express transfer near Bloor Street, as the collector lanes originally lacked direct access to the Toronto-bound QEW (downloaded from the province in 1998 to become the part of the Gardiner). The Gardiner Expressway also received an off-ramp to Sherway Gardens, which necessitated an underpass to be implemented in the directional ramp from the Highway 427 southbound express to the Hamilton-bound QEW.

In the late 2000s, the ramp from Highway 401 westbound to Highway 427 southbound, as well as the ramp for the opposite movement, were restriped from three lanes to two lanes.

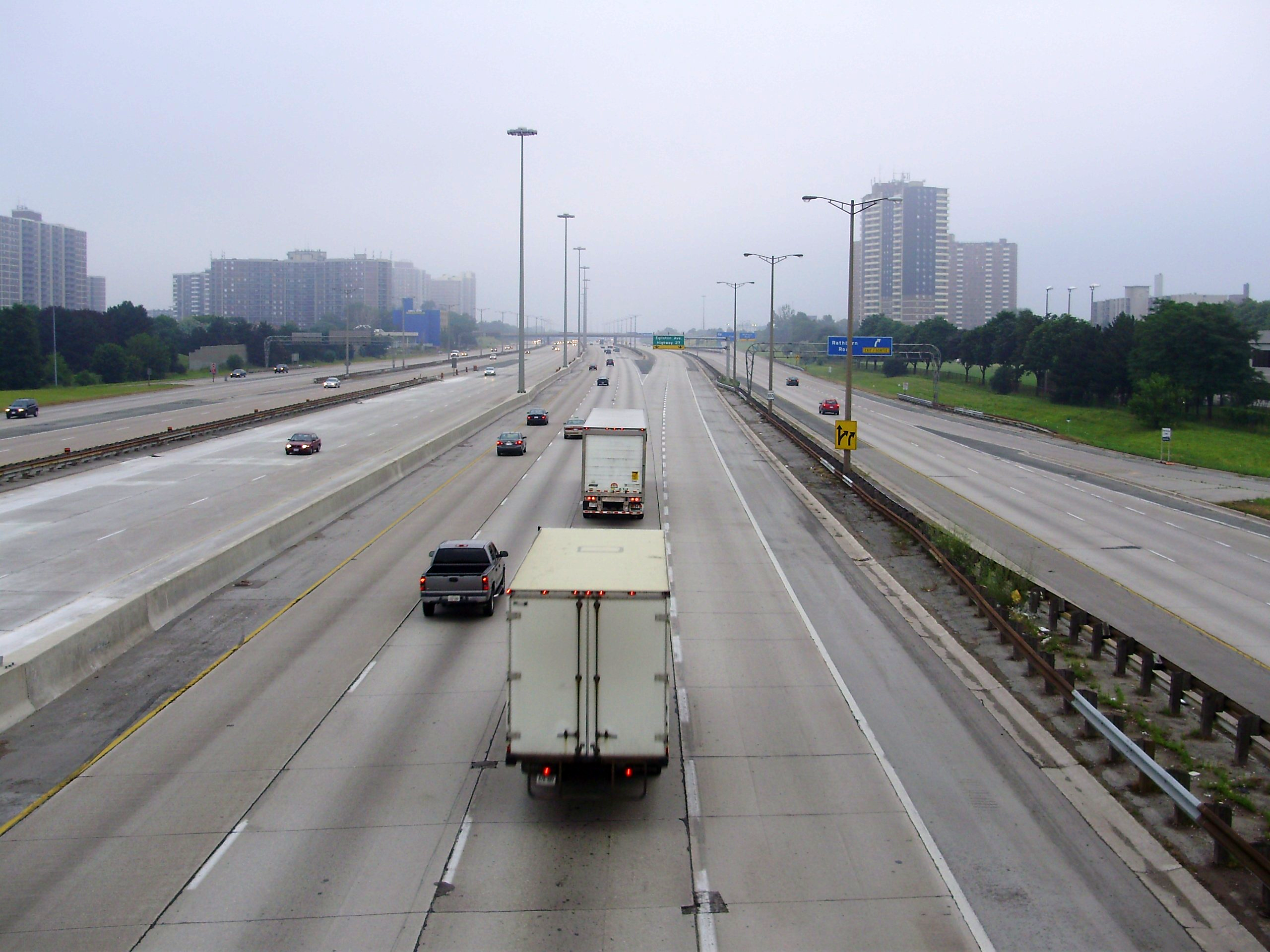
Highway 427 looking north from Burnhamthorpe Road, showing the newer concrete median barrier and high-mast lighting, with remaining 1970-era guardrail and lighting poles to be replaced.

=== Arterial extension and widening (2008–2021) ===
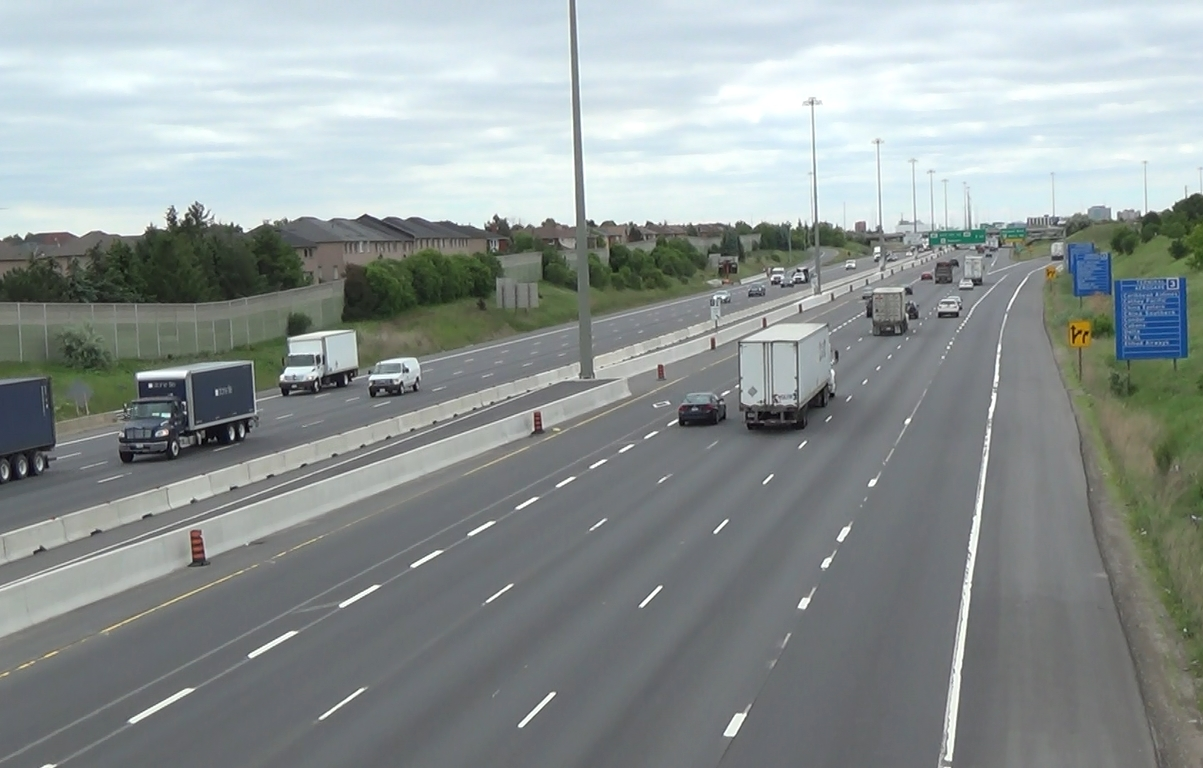
Nearly completed Highway 427 widening work as seen from the Morning Star Drive overpass in June 2018.

An 800-metre (2,600 ft) four-lane arterial road designated as Regional Road 99 was opened in the autumn of 2008 by York Region. This municipal addition ran from Highway 427's northern terminus at Highway 7 to a signalized intersection with Zenway Boulevard, and mainly served to provide improved access to Highway 27 and Highway 50. It was constructed as a temporary access road and not intended to be expanded to full freeway standards, with the use of portable jersey barriers as it approached the Highway 7 overpass, and its alignment veering on the western side of the right-of-way for the future Highway 427 extension. York Regional Road 99 was permanently closed on August 8, 2020, to make way for the extension of Highway 427 northwards to Major MacKenzie Drive (York Regional Road 25), which also involved constructing an overpass for Zenway Boulevard to cross the extended freeway.

A section of Highway 427 between Campus Road-Fasken Drive and Highway 7 was expanded to four lanes in each direction. This project included the installation of high-mast lighting, median barriers, and the addition of high-occupancy toll lanes (HOT) in both directions, and was completed in 2021 in conjunction with the Vaughan Extension (see below). One of the challenges during this project was widening the Highway 427 bridges crossing Highway 407 ETR, with the solution being steel box girders added on either side of the existing post-tensioned concrete structures, as opposed to the conventional bridge widening practice of the expansion using a similar construction to the original bridge since post-tensioned concrete additions require falsework which in turn would close down Highway 407 ETR lanes for extended periods. The completed HOT lanes stretch from south of Highway 409 to north of Rutherford Road. In conjunction with the widening work, and in anticipation of the opening of the extension north of Highway 7, exit numbers were added (still ongoing as of late 2021), starting with the northern sections of the highway.

=== Vaughan Extension (2017–2021) ===
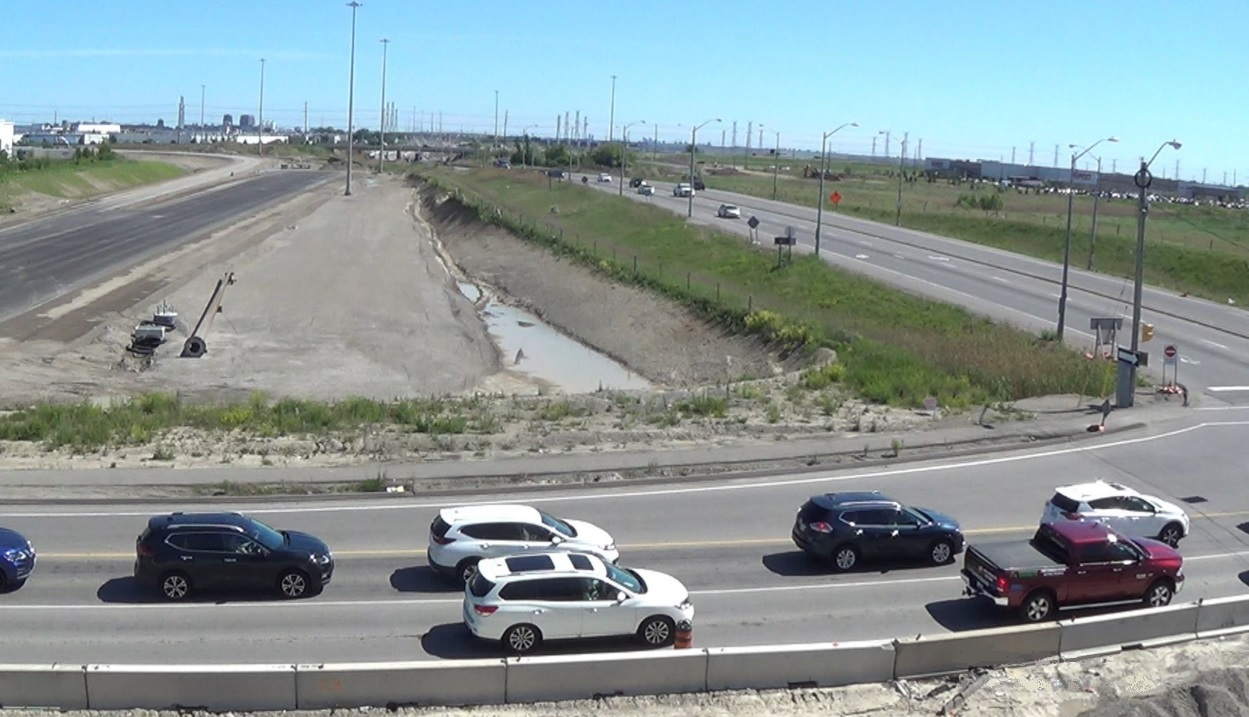
Highway 427 extension under construction looking south from the Zenway Drive overpass (construction detour at bottom) in June 2020, with a hydro corridor in the background. York Regional Road 99, the temporary extension of the highway, is at right.

An environmental assessment was completed on a northward extension of Highway 427 from Highway 7 to Major Mackenzie Drive to relieve traffic issues on Regional Road 27 and 50, as well as provide improved access to the Canadian Pacific Intermodal Terminal, with construction beginning in May 2017. The project included HOT lanes as far north as Rutherford Road, and was scheduled to open in 2021, with the HOT lanes opening the following year. However, a pending legal dispute between the provincial government and the constructor delayed the opening of the extension in late April 2021.

The extension was built by Link 427, a consortium of six companies that tendered the winning bid to Infrastructure Ontario, The project was estimated at a cost of $616 million, and included the design, financing, and construction of the extension, as well as its maintenance for thirty years. Construction required the periodic closure of eleven roads, as well as the removal of Regional Road 99. McGillivray Road was realigned at Rutherford Road, as was the intersection of Huntington Road and Major Mackenzie Drive. The extension north to Major Mackenzie Drive opened on September 18, 2021, after the legal dispute was settled.

== Future ==
There is a planned extension that would see the freeway pushed north to near Bolton to meet the proposed Highway 413, should that highway be constructed. On April 30, 2024, the Ontario provincial government confirmed it will start constructing Highway 413 in 2025 after coming to an agreement with the Canadian federal government, and Highway 413 would be the proposed northern terminus of Highway 427. The Highway 427 Extension Transportation Needs Assessment Study examined further extensions; connections with the Bradford Bypass freeway, as well as Highway 400 and Highway 11 north of Barrie were considered. In the past decade, there has been little discussion of this highway extension due to concerns with traversing the Oak Ridges Moraine and Minesing Wetlands.

== Exit list ==
The following table lists the major junctions along Highway 427, as noted by the Ministry of Transportation of Ontario.

Division	Location	km	mi	Exit	Destinations	Notes
Toronto		0.0	0.0	–	Brown's Line Coules Court	Highway 427 southern terminus; continues south as Brown's Line
Toronto		0.3	0.19	–	Evans Avenue	No access to QEW/Gardiner Expressway from northbound entrance
Toronto		0.6	0.37	–	Queen Elizabeth Way – Hamilton, Niagara Falls; Gardiner Expressway – Downtown Toronto	Southbound exit and northbound entrance; other movements are directed to Evans Avenue; QEW exit 139
Toronto				–	Sherway Gardens Road; The Queensway	No northbound exit; no access to QEW from southbound entrance.
Toronto		2.3	1.4	–	Dundas Street	Formerly Highway 5; no access to QEW from southbound entrance; incorrectly signed as "Regional Road 5"
Toronto				–	Gibbs Road	Right-in interchange; northbound entrance only
Toronto				–	Valhalla Road	Northbound right-out exit only
Toronto				–	Eva Road	Southbound RIRO exit and entrance
Toronto		4.2	2.6	4	Burnhamthorpe Road	
Toronto				–	Holiday Drive	Southbound right-out exit only
Toronto		5.2	3.2	–	Rathburn Road	Northbound exit and southbound entrance
Toronto				–	Eringate Drive	Southbound right-in entrance only; southbound exit accessible from Highway 27 and Eglinton Avenue
Toronto		7.8	4.8	–	Eglinton Avenue	No access to Highway 401 east from northbound entrance
Toronto		7.8	4.8	–	Highway 27 north	Northbound exit and southbound entrance
Toronto		7.8	4.8	–	Highway 401	No access from southbound Highway 427 to eastbound Highway 401 or westbound Highway 401 to northbound Highway 427; Highway 401 exits 348 (eastbound) and 352 (westbound)
Toronto–Peel boundary	Toronto–Mississauga boundary	10.3	6.4	–	Regional Road 7 (Airport Road) northwest / Dixon Road east	Northbound exit and southbound entrance, access to Toronto Pearson International Airport
Toronto–Peel boundary	Toronto–Mississauga boundary			–	Fasken Drive	Northbound exit only
Toronto–Peel boundary	Toronto–Mississauga boundary	11.6	7.2	13	Highway 409	Southbound access to eastbound 401 via Highway 409, access to Toronto Pearson International Airport. Former southbound access via traffic signal, replaced by a ramp in 1994.
Toronto–Peel boundary	Toronto–Mississauga boundary	14.2	8.8	15	Regional Road 5 (Derry Road) west / Rexdale Boulevard east	
Toronto–Peel boundary	Toronto–Mississauga boundary			–	Morning Star Drive	Former signalized intersection closed in the 1990s after an overpass was constructed
Toronto		16.0	9.9	17	Finch Avenue; Etobicoke General Hospital	
York	Vaughan	18.3	11.4	19	407 ETR	Toll highway; Highway 407 exit 58
York	Vaughan	19.9	12.4	21	Regional Road 7 (Highway 7) – Brampton, Markham	Former Highway 7. Northern terminus of Highway 427 from 1991 to 2021
From 2008 to 2020, Highway 427 unofficially continued as York Regional Road 99 to Zenway Boulevard. Arterial road extension closed in 2020 in advance of the 427 extension's 2021 opening due to extension connection work.
York	Vaughan	22.0	13.7	23	Regional Road 72 (Langstaff Road)	
York	Vaughan	23.9	14.9	25	Regional Road 73 (Rutherford Road)	
York	Vaughan	26.3	16.3	–	Regional Road 25 (Major Mackenzie Drive)	Highway 427 northern terminus
York	Vaughan	26.3	16.3	–	Garnet Williams Way	Northbound exit only
York	Vaughan	29.3	18.2	—	Highway 413	Proposed northern terminus of Highway 427.
1.000 mi = 1.609 km; 1.000 km = 0.621 mi: Closed/former; Incomplete access; Proposed; Tolled

== See also ==
- Highway 427 BRT
