= Mackenzie Richmond Hill Hospital =

- Mackenzie Health
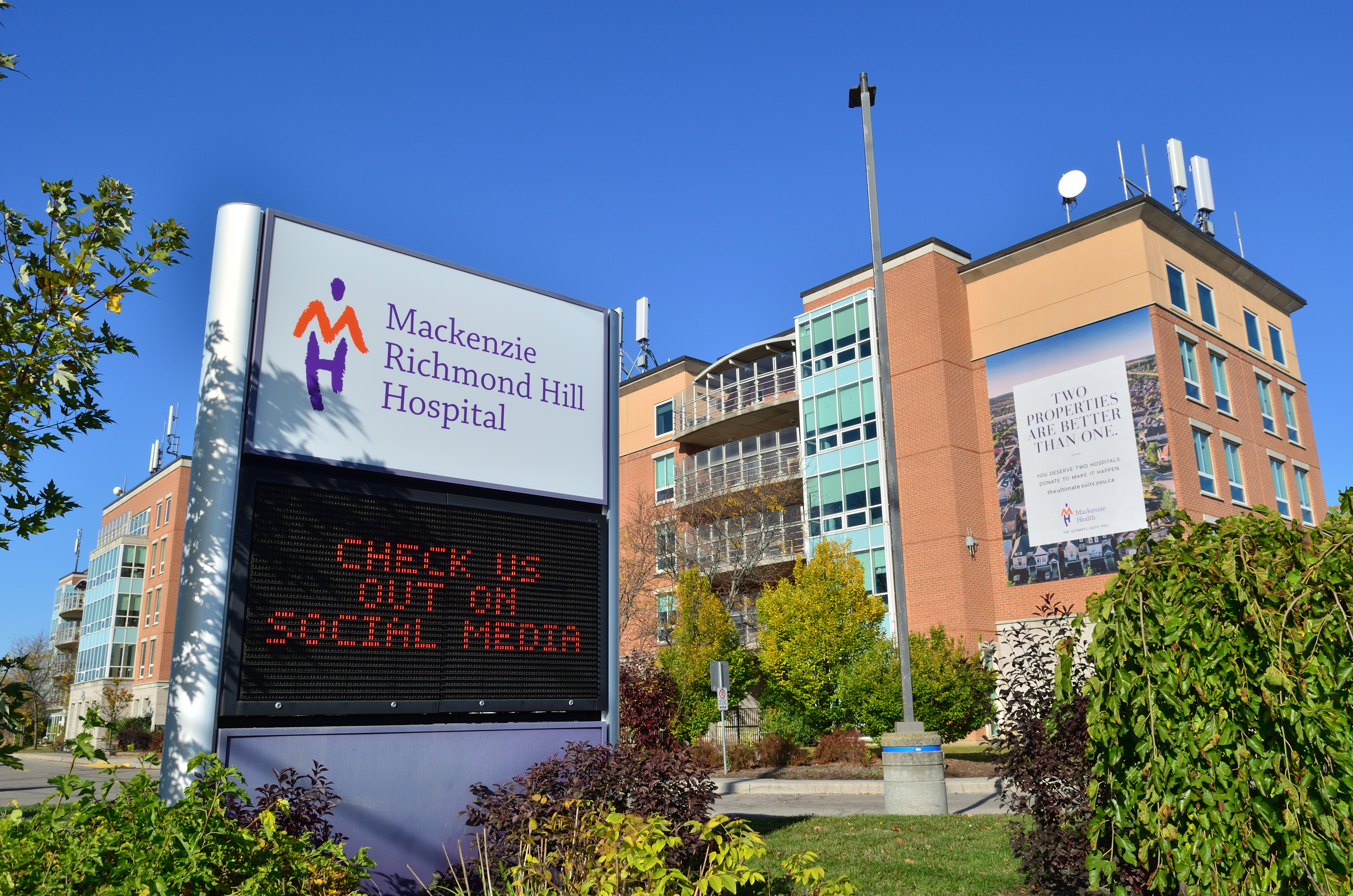
- Wing A of Mackenzie Richmond Hill Hospital

Geography
- Location: Richmond Hill, York Region, Ontario, Canada
- Coordinates: 43°52′11″N 79°27′00″W

Organization
- Care system: Public Medicare (Canada) (OHIP)
- Type: General

Services
- Emergency department: Yes
- Beds: 506

History
- Former name: York Central Hospital (1963–2012)
- Founded: 1963

Links
- Website: http://www.mackenziehealth.ca/
- Lists: Hospitals in Canada

Mackenzie Richmond Hill Hospital (formerly York Central Hospital) is a hospital in Richmond Hill, Ontario, Canada and one of four in York Regional Municipality. Mackenzie Health in Richmond Hill is part of the Local Health Integration Network (LHIN) Hospital Partnerships.

== History ==
Mackenzie Richmond Hill Hospital was founded in 1963 in Vaughan Township as York Central Hospital, close to the suburb of Richmond Hill, and incorporated into Richmond Hill following the amalgamation of the town in 1973. Funded by both local donations and public money, the hospital opened less than a half mile (800 metres) from the old commercial downtown of Richmond Hill. Since its inception, the hospital has undergone several expansions to cope with the rapid population growth of Richmond Hill, the latest of which was completed in 2009. In September 1974, it opened a 300-bed extension. In 2012, in conjunction with managing the construction of the Cortellucci Vaughan Hospital and to grow health care services in the area, the hospital was renamed Mackenzie Richmond Hill Hospital; both hospitals would be administered by Mackenzie Health, a new regional healthcare services provider.

== 2003 SARS outbreak ==
In 2003, hospital workers contracted Severe acute respiratory syndrome (SARS) from a patient who had been transferred from Scarborough Grace Hospital, which prompted the closing of the hospital on March 28. The hospital's emergency room and maternity ward reopened on April 19.

Inpatients were required to have their body temperature checked twice daily, and those who had SARS-related symptoms such as a fever or respiratory issues were isolated and required to have a chest X-ray. All pneumonia patients were treated in isolation until a pulmonologist could assess them to eliminate SARS as a cause.

== Locations ==
The Hospital occupies four adjoining buildings in central Richmond Hill, with a total of five floors in each building.

- A Wing - The southernmost building contains the Centre for Continuing Care and Rehabilitation (CCCR).
- B Wing - Douglas H. Storms Memorial Wing
- C Wing - Dr. James Langstaff Memorial Wing, Main hospital entrance
- D Wing - The newest building is the Town of Richmond Hill Wing. This building contains the Emergency Room, the ICU and the Main Dialysis unit.

The Vaughan Satellite Dialysis Unit of Mackenzie Richmond Hill Hospital's Regional Dialysis Program is located at 9401 Jane Street. Patients referred to this unit must be medically able to receive dialysis away from the hospital and find this location more convenient. The unit consists of 33-station renal dialysis units, including a nephrology out-patient clinic.

== Services ==
The hospital has one of two dialysis centres in York Region, and received a new 1.5T Magnetic Resonance Imaging (MRI) unit in 2005.

- Ambulatory Care Services
- Continuing Care Program
- Diagnostic Imaging
- District Stroke Centre
- Emergency Medicine Program
- Laboratory Medicine
- Long Term Care
- Magnetic Resonance Imaging
- Medicine Program
- Mental Health Program
- Rehabilitation Services
- Surgery Program
- York Region Dialysis Program
