= George Herbert Mitchell =

Canadian politician (1888/89–1980)

George Herbert Mitchell (1888/1889—1980) was a Canadian politician who served in the Ontario legislature as CCF MPP for York North from 1943 to 1945 and also served as reeve of North York, Ontario from 1940 until 1949.

Mitchell was the last reeve of North York to be elected by a predominantly rural electorate as after World War II North York's population began to boom as the township transformed into a residential suburb of Toronto.

As reeve, he kept track of expectant mothers come snowfall to ensure that the township's two snowplows kept open the sideroads around their homes. Mitchell was the last reeve to be elected by a predominantly rural electorate.

Mitchell was born in England and was the son of an innkeeper in Manchester. He immigrated to Canada in 1910.

Mitchell served in World War I and was wounded twice. He entered the real estate and construction business after being demobilized.

He was elected deputy reeve in 1938 but was disqualified when it was found that his property was in his wife's name, as only property owners could hold office. He resigned and his wife was elected in a by-election. Mitchell himself was acclaimed to the position the following year.
