= Taste of Asia =

- Status: Active
- Location: Markham, Ontario
- Country: Canada
- Inaugurated: 2003
- Attendance: 180,000+
- Organizer: Federation of Chinese Canadians in Markham (FCCM)
- Filing status: Non-profit
- Website: http://www.taste-of-asia.ca/

The Taste of Asia is a non-profit annual street festival organized by the Federation of Chinese Canadians in Markham (FCCM) located in Markham, Ontario, Canada. It is the largest Asian festival in Canada with over 180,000 attendees each year. Major attractions include exotic food vendors, live performances from famous Asian pop culture celebrities, and a variety of community events ranging from basketball competitions to hot sauce competitions. The festival takes place between the intersections of Kennedy Road and Clayton Drive to Kennedy Road and Steeles Avenue East during the last weekend of June. It is located beside Pacific Mall and Market Village.

The Taste of Asia was named as one of the top festivals in Ontario by Festivals and Events Ontario.

In 2021, the event was held between June 25–27 at Kennedy and Steeles. In 2020, due to the COVID-19 pandemic, the event was held virtually.

== Programming ==
Taste of Asia showcases various performances relating to Asian culture including musical performances, dances, and martial arts performances. In 2017, Taste of Asia featured TVB superstar Elanne Kong.

== History ==
Taste of Asia was created in 2003 during the outbreak of severe acute respiratory syndrome (SARS) with the goal of recovering the local economy.

== Organizer ==
Since its establishment, FCCM has organized, participated and been involved in a variety of events that promote the Chinese community and culture, most notably the annual Taste of Asia street festival. Other events include the 2016 Chinese New Year Celebration at the Markham Civic Centre and Vaughn City Hall, Mid-Autumn Festival, Thanksgiving, Asialicious program, PRC Flag Raising, YRP International Day of Elimination of Discrimination and many more. FCCM's goal for organizing these events is not only to bring awareness to the Chinese culture but to also interact and appreciate other cultural backgrounds participating. FCCM also has collaborated with multiple other charitable organizations in the past such as United Way of York Region, Sunnybrook and Women's College Health Sciences Centre, Markham-Stouffville Hospital, and the Canadian Red Cross.

== Location ==
In 2021 and 2022, Taste of Asia was hosted at Kennedy Road and Steeles Avenue East between the border of Markham and Scarborough. It also happens to be located beside Pacific Mall, the largest indoor Asian shopping mall in North America and is said to be the largest indoor Asian shopping mall in the western world. Between the festivals dates, the area of Kennedy Road between Clayton Drive and Steeles Avenue East was closed for the festival booths and attendees.
