= New Horizon Mall =

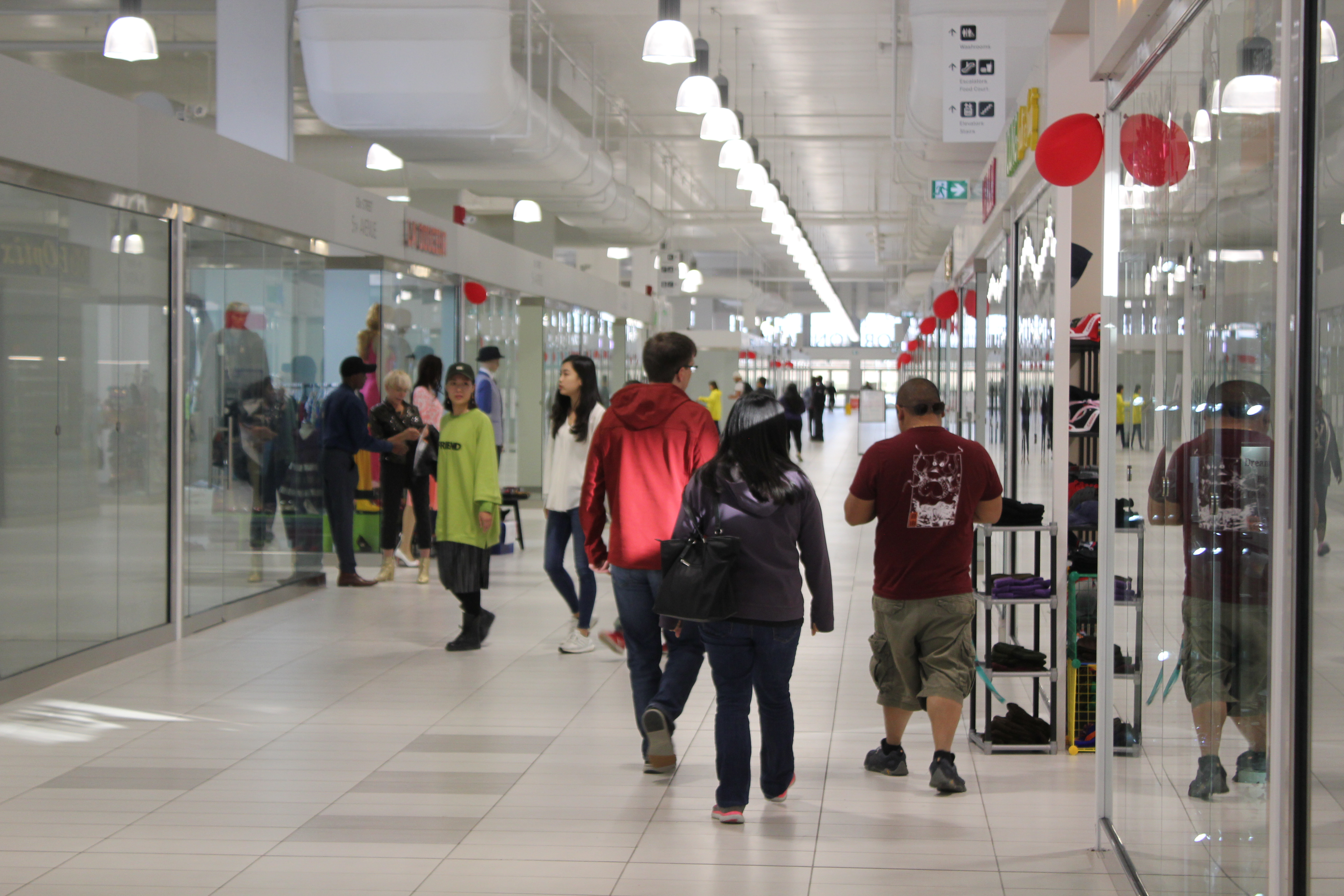
- Location: Rocky View County, Alberta, Canada
- Coordinates: 51.1960°N 113.9965°W
- Address: 260300 Writing Creek Crescent
- Opened: May 1, 2018
- Manager: Condominium Corporation 1810813
- Owner: The Torgan Group
- Num. of stores: 517 (incl. vacant)
- Num. of anchor tenants: 3
- Floor area: 30,000 m^{2} (320,000 sq ft)
- Floors: 2 and 1 basement
- Website: newhorizonmall.com

New Horizon Mall is a shopping mall in the Calgary Metropolitan Region located inside Balzac, a hamlet of Rocky View County, Alberta. The mall features a retail floor space of approximately 30,000 m^{2} (320,000 square feet), and features a flea market design with smaller stores inside the mall; this allows the mid-sized mall to have the second most stores inside a mall in Canada at over 500 store locations. The mall opened its doors on May 1, 2018, As of February 2021, over 100 had opened for business. The grand opening was scheduled for October 27, 2018, however on September 21, 2018, the opening was pushed to 2019. It was modeled after the Pacific Mall in Markham, Ontario.

== History ==
New Horizon Mall was first announced in 2013 by the Torgan Group, with construction expected to begin in 2014 and finish in late 2016. Construction of the mall was awarded to Ledcor and expected to cost $200 million. The project broke ground in June 2016 following unexpected delays, which pushed back its completion date to late 2017. In August 2017, the developers announced that the mall would be complete by March 2018, and that it had already sold over 95% of the mall's units.

New Horizon Mall opened its doors on May 1, 2018. 99% of the mall's 517 units were sold by October 2018, though only 11 of those units were open for business. The mall's developers called the low occupancy rates "totally expected", citing Pacific Mall in Ontario, which took two years to reach 75% occupancy. Nonetheless, a grand opening event planned for October was pushed back to the following year.

Two new anchor tenants were announced in 2019. The Best Shop, a retail outlet described as "Chinese Walmart", was announced as the mall's first anchor tenant in March and opened in four months later. The store received eight months of free rent and financial support for improvements to its 15,000 square feet (1,400 m^{2}) retail space. In April 2019, a 23,000 square feet (2,100 m^{2}) farmers market, Prairie Horizon Fresh Market, was announced as the mall's second anchor tenant. Due to the COVID-19 pandemic, the market's grand opening in March 2020 took place mostly online, focusing on fresh food delivery.

109 out of 517 units at New Horizon Mall were occupied by businesses by October 2019; the low traffic and occupancy prompted the mall to host a meeting to address the concerns of owners. New Horizon Mall exceeded 50% retail tenant occupation in February 2020 with the planned opening of Sky Castle, a 34,000 square feet (3,200 m^{2}) indoor playground and family entertainment centre anchored on the mall's second floor. The facility opened in June 2021.

== Features and events ==
A unique feature of the mall is that it features small independent shops rather than large chains like other shopping malls, with each unit being sold to investors as condominiums. According to the Mall's online directory, the majority of retail spaces are less than 300 square feet in size, and many of those are less than 150 square feet. Almost all the rest are under 500 square feet. There is also a food court, and event stage, and heated underground parkade.

== Anchors ==
- Sky Castle Indoor Playground
- The Best Shop
- Playmore Tables and Games
