= Milliken GO Station =

Railway station in Toronto, Ontario, Canada

Milliken
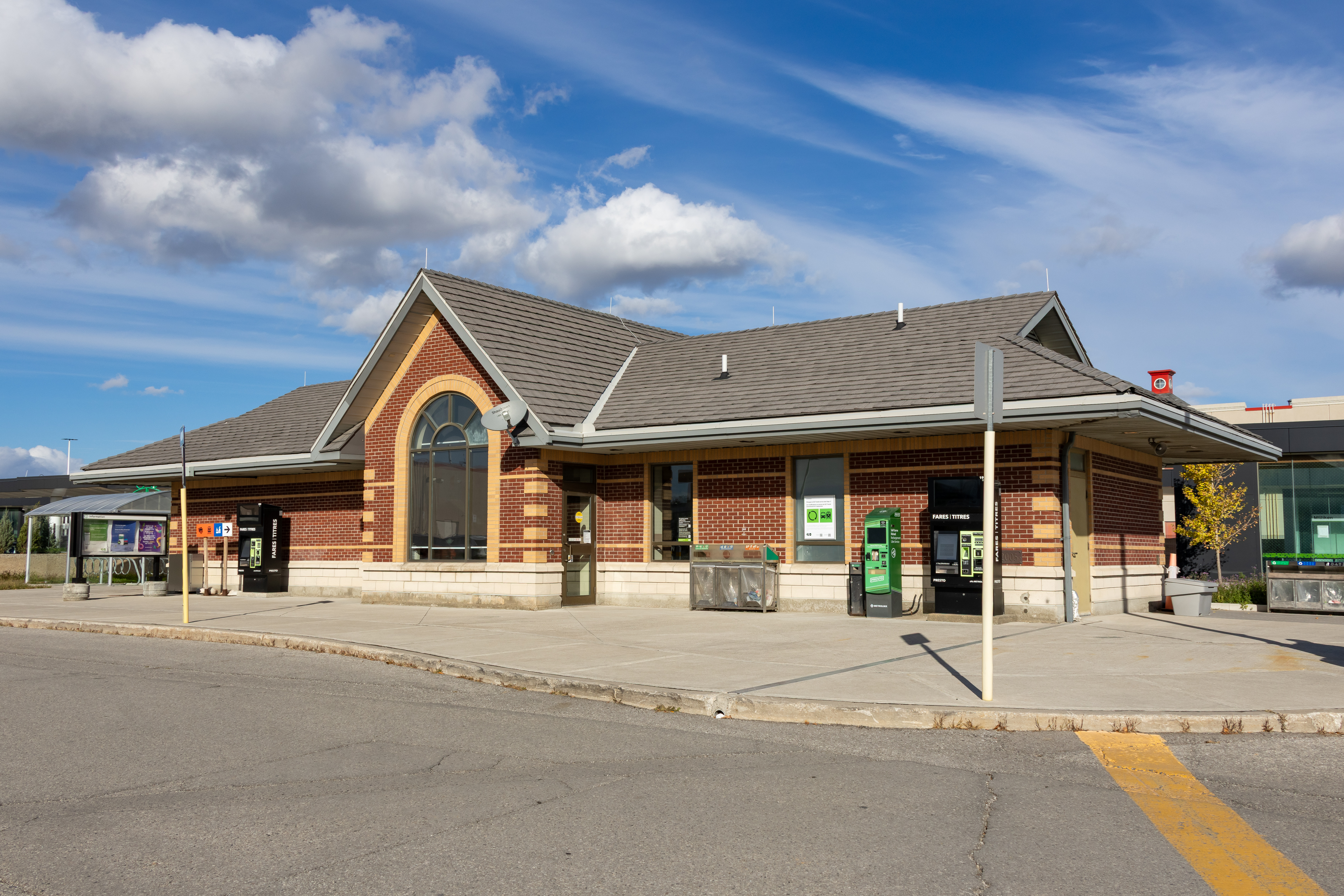
- Milliken GO Station in 2025

General information
- Location: 39 Redlea Avenue; Scarborough, Ontario; Canada
- Coordinates: 43°49′23.5″N 79°18′06″W
- Owner: Metrolinx
- Platforms: 2 side platforms
- Tracks: 2
- Connections: TTC buses; York Region Transit

Construction
- Structure type: Station building
- Parking: 661 spaces
- Cycle facilities: Yes
- Accessible: Yes

Other information
- Station code: GO Transit: MK
- Fare zone: 70

History
- Opened: September 7, 1982; 43 years ago (North of Steeles Avenue); September 6, 2005; 20 years ago (South of Steeles Avenues)
- Closed: September 6, 2005 and relocated
- Rebuilt: 2004–2005, 2019-2023

Passengers
- 2018: 195,000 ▲18.7%

Services
Preceding station	GO Transit	Following station
Agincourt towards Union	Stouffville	Unionville towards Old Elm
Former services at CN station
Preceding station	Canadian National Railway	Following station
Agincourt toward Toronto	Toronto – Belleville via Peterboro	Unionville toward Belleville
Agincourt toward Toronto	Toronto – Port Hope via Peterboro	Unionville toward Port Hope
Location

Milliken GO Station is a GO Transit train station in Toronto, Ontario, Canada. It is located in the neighbourhood of Milliken which is on the city's northern border with Markham. It serves the Stouffville line.

== Description ==
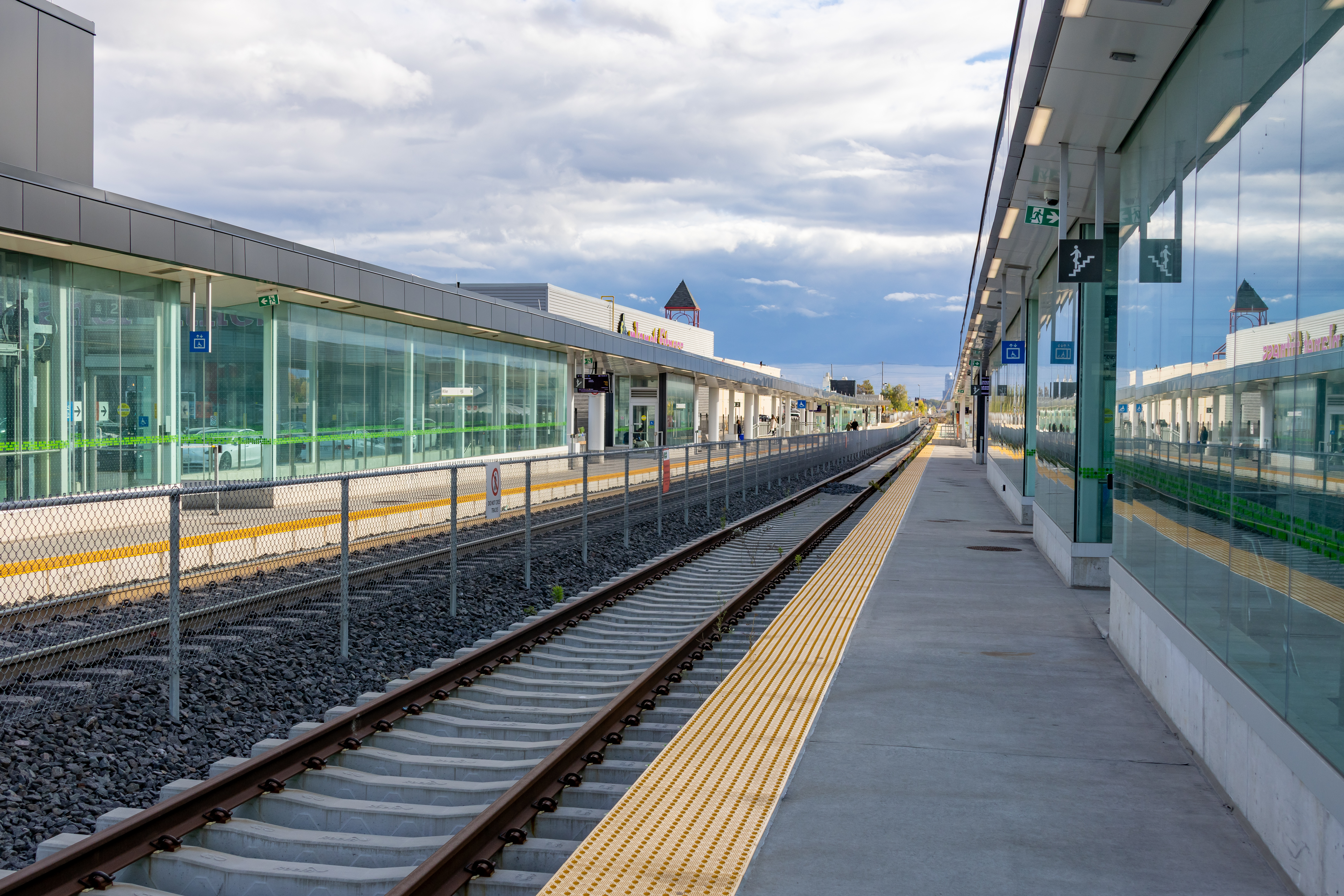
Platforms at Milliken GO station

The station is located south of Steeles Avenue, opposite to the Splendid China Mall shopping centre and is accessed via Redlea Avenue. The station has two tracks, two side platforms and two pedestrian tunnels to connect the east platform to the station next to the west platform. There is also direct access to the platforms from Steeles Avenue. It has a 661-car parking lot, a dedicated passenger pick-up and drop-off area, and a station building with ticket vending machines, a waiting area, and public washrooms.

== History ==
A small shed was built (in latter 19th Century) by the Toronto and Nipissing Railway as a flag stop located on the north side of Steeles Avenue on the east side of the tracks (see postcards) and used by successor railways (Grand Trunk Railway and Canadian National Railways) until it was demolished in the early 1960s. CN continued passenger service on the line (Union to Stouffville from 1971) until 1977 when VIA Rail took over passenger rail service. VIA cut service in 1981.

The first GO station opened on September 7, 1982 and closed on September 2, 2005. It was located on the north side of Steeles in Markham, to the east of the former Market Village Mall. It consisted of a fenced off area with a small ticket booth and 2 large bus shelters. It was one of the most neglected GO railway stations because it was built on a sharp curve, and was much shorter than most GO stations. Because of that, trains could not open all the doors when stopped there. It had no dedicated parking spots and a small kiss-and-ride area. Cars waiting for the trains were parked at Market Village or along Steeles Avenue. There are no traces of the former platform, other than a single sign facing towards Steeles Avenue reading "CN Milliken" which has since been removed after double tracking work. The old station footprint is now on the northbound tracks.

The second GO station opened on September 6, 2005 on the south side of Steeles Avenue and was accessed by a re-aligned Redlea Avenue. The new location allowed the construction of a parking lot for 680 vehicles and an accessible new station.

Milliken GO Station has been undergoing redevelopment since 2019 to support future growth, including two way, all day 15-minute interval service between Union Station and Unionville Station. Once complete, along with the grade-separated crossing and the pedestrian bridge over Steeles Avenue, there will be a longer renovated existing platform, a new second station platform and track, two pedestrian tunnels and elevators, new shelters, and access from both platforms to a covered pedestrian bridge over Steeles Avenue. The redevelopment was planned to be completed by the end of 2022.

On May 8, 2023, the south tunnel and the east-side platform were opened for customer use. On that date, trains started to use the east platform only while the west platform was being upgraded. A north tunnel near Steeles Avenue was also available. In September 2023, Metrolinx announced that all station upgrades at Milliken had been completed including the railway overpass over Steeles Avenue.

== Connecting transit ==
There is a short covered walkway beside the railway tracks from the train platforms to bus stops on Steeles Avenue East.

Toronto Transit Commission's bus routes 53 Steeles East operates along Steeles Avenue East and 43 Kennedy terminates by looping there, as does the 57 Midland.

York Region Transit route 8 Kennedy stops at the nearby Steeles Avenue and Kennedy Road intersection.
