= Splendid China Mall =

Shopping mall in Toronto, Canada

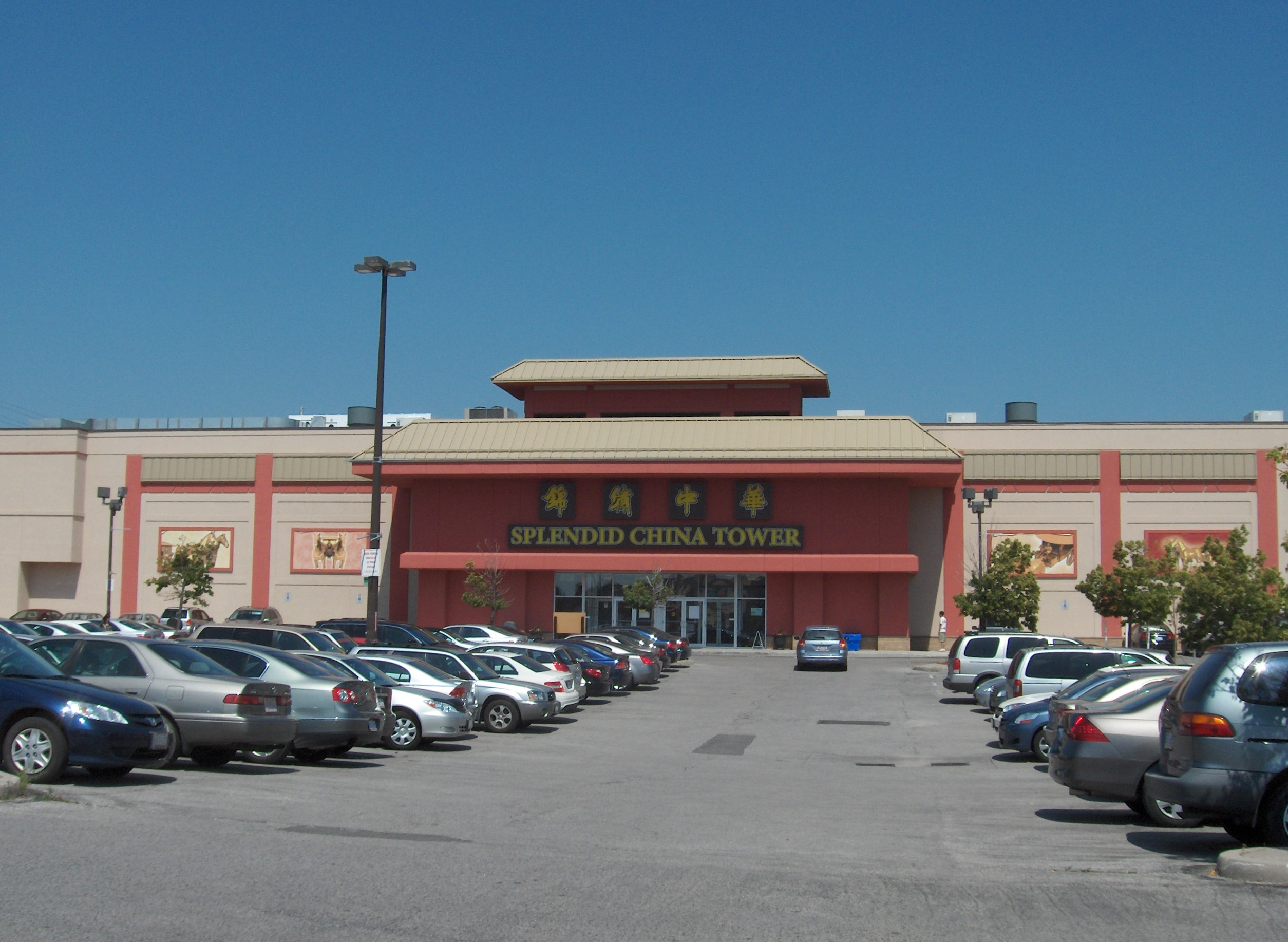
- Entrance to Splendid China Mall; the entrance sign shows its former name
- Coordinates: 43.824°N 79.3028°W
- Address: 4675 Steeles Avenue East; Toronto, Ontario; M1V 4S5
- Opened: February 17, 2007
- Developer: Splendid China Development Inc.
- Num. of stores: 150
- Floors: 2
- Website: splendidchinamall.ca

Splendid China Mall
- Traditional Chinese: 錦繡中華
- Simplified Chinese: 锦绣中华
Transcriptions
Standard Mandarin
- Hanyu Pinyin: Jǐnxiù Zhōnghuá
Yue: Cantonese
- Yale Romanization: gam2 sau3 zung1 waa4

Splendid China Mall (traditional Chinese: 錦繡中華; simplified Chinese: 锦绣中华) (formerly known as Splendid China Tower) is a 90,000-square-foot (8,400 m^{2}) Chinese-themed ethnic shopping centre located at the southeast corner of Redlea Avenue and Steeles Avenue in the Scarborough district of Toronto, Ontario, Canada. It is on the Scarborough side of Steeles Avenue (the other side is in Markham, Ontario). It is located adjacent to Milliken GO Station and across from the Pacific Mall along with the now closed Market Village. The structure was formerly occupied by Canadian Tire.

== Chinese language signs ==
Scarborough's local sign bylaws limit the size a business may post signs in one singular language. The signs the centre has (in Chinese characters) taken up the permitted total wall acreage, so permission had to be sought to add an English sign.

== See also ==
- Chinese Canadians in the Greater Toronto Area
