= Green Bush Inn =

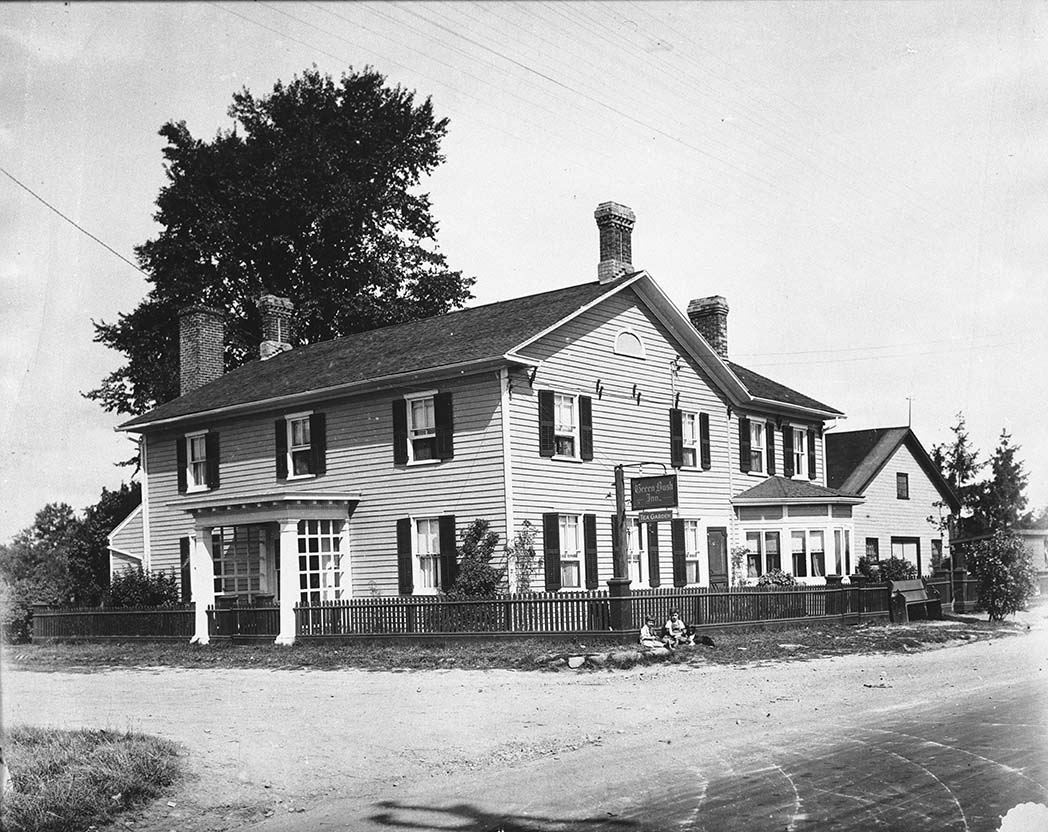
The Green Bush Inn at Yonge and Steeles.

There have been several enterprises in the Toronto region called the Green Bush Inn. The first Green Bush Inn was a two-story clapboard structure built around 1830 on the northeast corner of Yonge Street and Steeles Avenue. The Inn was a meeting place for those planning the Upper Canada Rebellion. A second Green Bush Inn was opened at 215-217 Shuter Street. According to F.R. Berchem, in Opportunity Road: Yonge Street 1860-1939, Joseph Abraham opened both establishments. Wes Porter, writing in Hort Pro magazine, asserts Thomas Steele, the namesake for Steeles Avenue, was the first proprietor. By 1876 the second Green Bush Inn was under new management, and by 1880 it had been renamed the Russell House.

In 1938, the structure was moved to the northwest corner and was used as a family home.

In 1969, a student association at the newly opened York University made plans to move it on campus and reopen it as a student pub. However, the structure was not moved and was demolished in 1972 although the pub adopted its early name.

== See also ==
Steeles Avenue
