= Agincourt GO Station =

Railway station in Toronto, Ontario, Canada

Agincourt
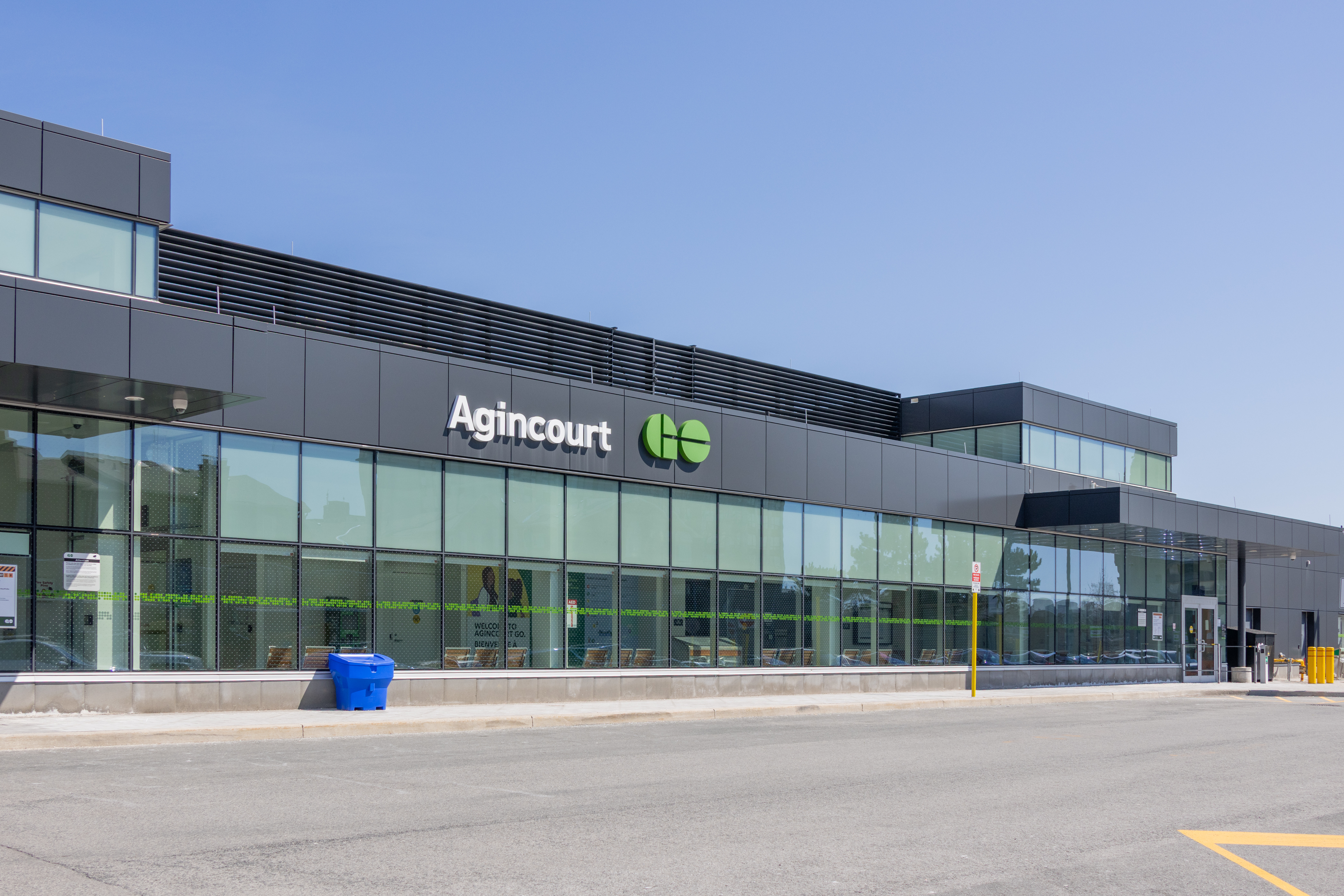
- Station building in 2026

General information
- Location: 4100 Sheppard Avenue East; Scarborough, Ontario; Canada
- Coordinates: 43°47′10″N 79°17′04″W
- Owner: Metrolinx
- Platforms: 2 side platforms
- Tracks: 2
- Connections: TTC Buses

Construction
- Structure type: Brick station building
- Parking: 340 spaces
- Cycle facilities: Yes
- Accessible: Yes

Other information
- Station code: GO Transit: AG
- Fare zone: 07

History
- Opened: September 7, 1982; 44 years ago (as a GO station)
- Rebuilt: October 2021

Passengers
- 2018: 134,000 ▲15.2%

Services
Preceding station	GO Transit	Following station
Kennedy towards Union	Stouffville	Milliken towards Old Elm
Former services at CN station
Preceding station	Canadian National Railway	Following station
Scarboro toward Toronto	Toronto – Belleville via Peterboro	Millikens toward Belleville
Scarboro toward Toronto	Toronto – Port Hope via Peterboro	Millikens toward Port Hope
Location

Agincourt GO Station is a GO Transit railway station in Toronto, Ontario, Canada. The Stouffville line station serves the Agincourt neighbourhood in the former suburb of Scarborough.

== History ==
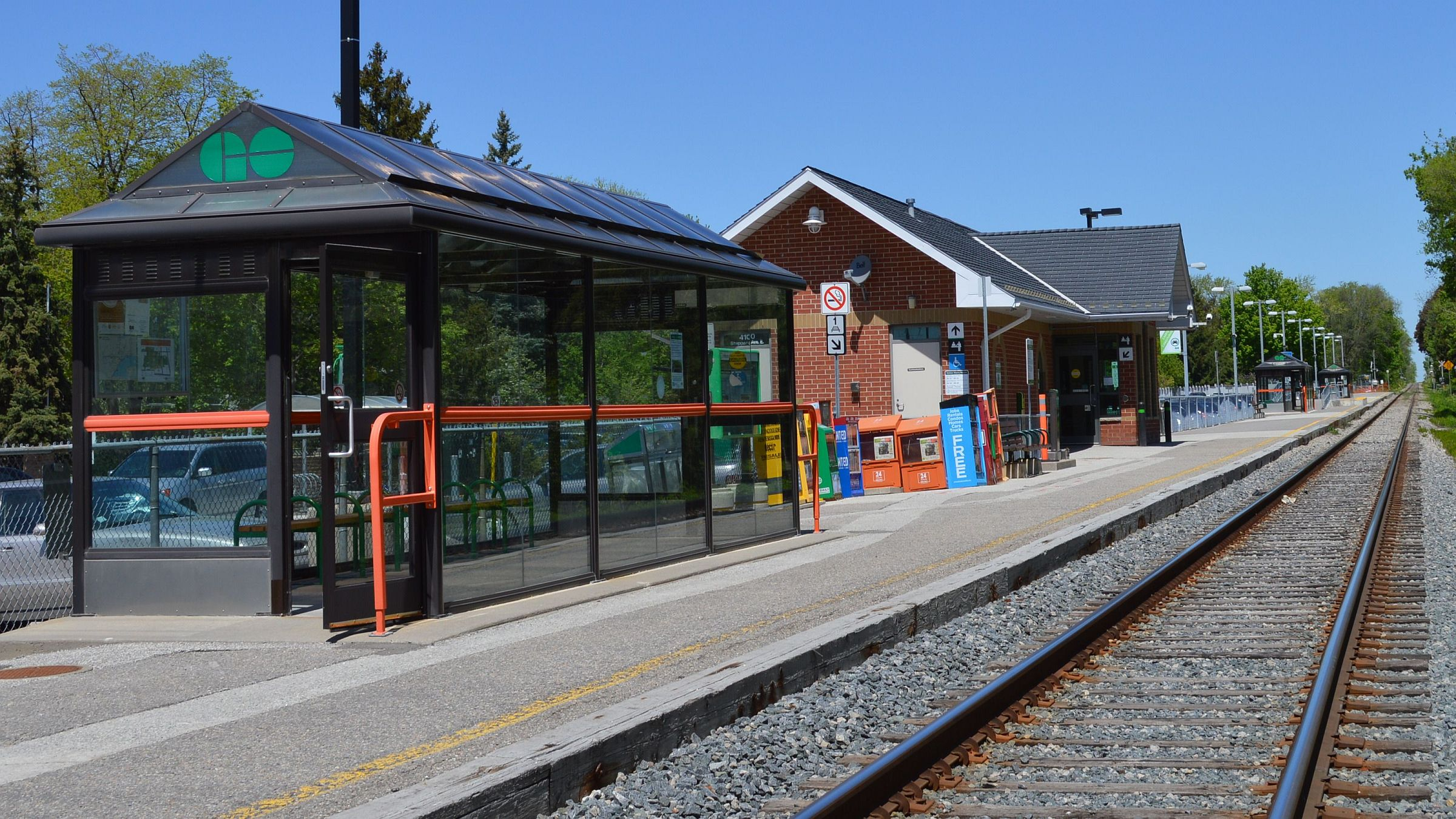
First Agincourt GO Station, built 1982, demolished 2021

The station's track was once used by Toronto and Nipissing Railway and later Grand Trunk Railway and finally by Canadian National Railway. TNR opened a simple wooden station at Agincourt in 1871. The CN station lasted into the 1970s and was demolished to accommodate the first Agincourt GO Station built in 1982. There was also a separate CPR Agincourt station located further east, built in 1884 by the Ontario and Quebec Railway which later merged with the Canadian Pacific Railway; it was demolished in 1962 and replaced by a passenger shelter that in turn was demolished in 1975.

In 2018, EllisDon Transit Infrastructure was awarded a contract to expand the station for increased Regional Express Rail service. The project included construction of a second platform, improved pedestrian and vehicle connections, and a new station building. By February 2021, the old station building built in 1982 was demolished. By October 2021, the new station building was completed; however, at that time work still remained for tracks, platforms and the parking area. By November 2022, two new pedestrian tunnels had opened between the north- and southbound platforms which also allows community members to cross the right-of-way underground; the pedestrian level crossing at Marilyn Avenue had closed. A new parking lot with 74 spaces was added at the north end of the station area along with a pick-up, drop-off area for 24 vehicles. In September 2023, Metrolinx announced that all work had been completed at Agincourt.

== Station description ==
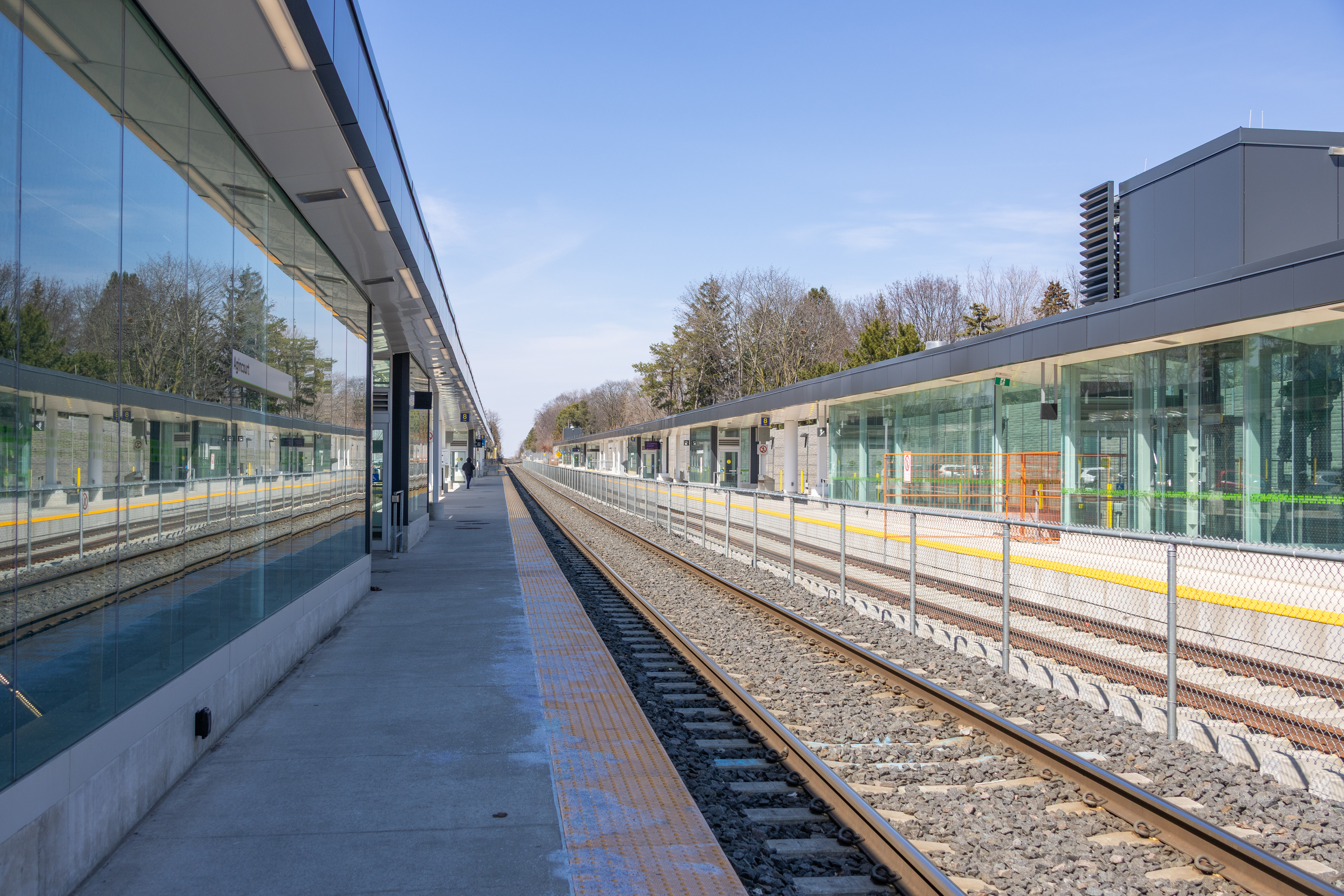
Station platform in 2026

The station has the following features:

- Station building featuring waiting area, digital displays, wood paneled ceiling, phone charging stations, accessible washrooms
- Designed for LEED certification
- Passenger pick-up and drop-off area (Kiss & Ride)
- Indoor bike storage room for eight bicycles
- Two tracks and two platforms
- Two pedestrian tunnels with elevators
- Canopies and integrated platform shelters
- Connection to Sheppard Avenue at the south end of the platforms

== Connecting transit ==
The Toronto Transit Commission's 85 Sheppard East ‚ 985 Sheppard East Express and the 904 Sheppard-Kennedy bus routes links Agincourt GO to Don Mills station in the west, the 85 and 985 continues east into Scarborough while the 904 continues express to Scarborough Centre station.

== Grade separation ==
When the Sheppard East LRT was a plan back in 2010, it required a grade separation of Sheppard Avenue East and the GO train tracks. This led contractors from the City of Toronto government and TTC to build a bridge for the GO train tracks, while having Sheppard Avenue move under it, as the light rail vehicles would not have been able to cross the GO tracks at ground level. On July 3, 2012, the underpass was completed and opened to regular traffic, which was five months ahead of schedule. However, in April 2019, Ontario premier Doug Ford announced that the provincial government would extend Line 4 Sheppard to McCowan Road at some unspecified time in the future, replacing the proposed Sheppard East LRT.

The new underpass improves not only the flow of traffic along Sheppard Avenue, as vehicles no longer have to wait at a rail crossing, but also GO train service. The bridge also allows for two-way service on this portion of the line. Building the bridge also meant that the parking capacity of the station could be expanded. It has now been increased to 340 spaces.
