= Steeles Avenue =

Road in Ontario, Canada

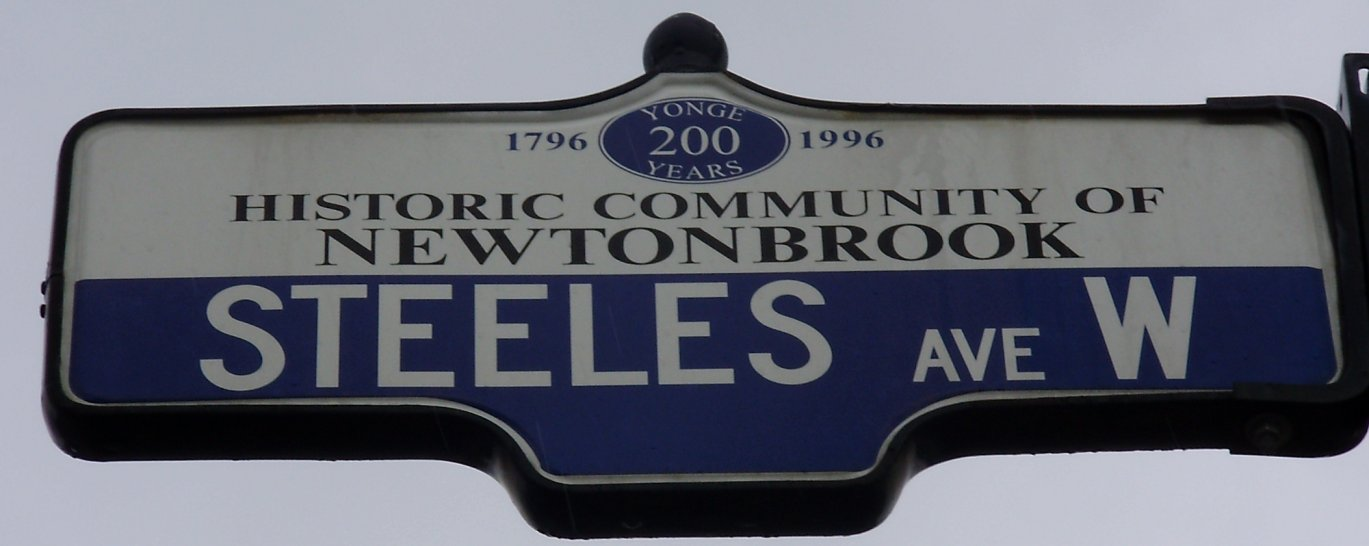
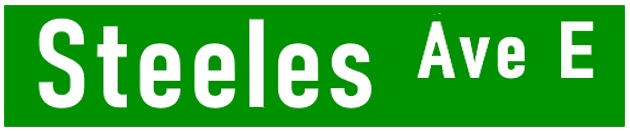
- Halton Regional Road 8 Peel Regional Road 15; York Regional Road 95 (unsigned)
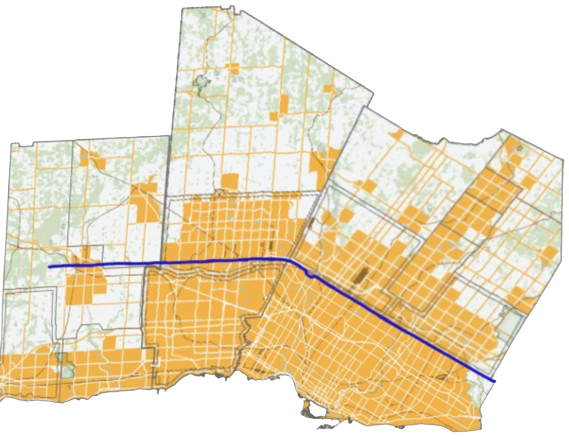
- Route of Steeles Avenue in the Greater Toronto Area (GTA), Highlighted in a blue line.
- Namesake: Thomas Steele
- Maintained by: City of Toronto; Region of Peel; Region of Halton
- Length: 77.5 km (48.2 mi)
- Location: Toronto; Vaughan; Markham; Brampton; Milton; Halton Hills
- West end: Appleby Line in Milton
- Major junctions: (Former) Highway 25 (Martin Street); Trafalgar Road; Winston Churchill Boulevard; Mississauga Road; Hurontario Street / Main Street; Highway 410; Airport Road (Former) Highway 50 / Albion Road (Former) Highway 27; Islington Avenue; Weston Road; Highway 400; Jane Street; Keele Street; Dufferin Street; Bathurst Street; Yonge Street; Bayview Avenue; Leslie Street; Don Mills Road; Highway 404 / Woodbine Avenue; Warden Avenue; Kennedy Road; McCowan Road; Markham Road
- East end: Scarborough-Pickering Townline / York-Durham Line in Pickering (Continues as Taunton Road)

Other
Nearby arterial roads
← Finch Avenue; Derry Road	John Street; 14th Avenue; Highway 7 Queen Street →

Steeles Avenue is an east–west street that stretches 77.5 km (48.2 mi) across the western and central Greater Toronto Area in Ontario, Canada. Running from Appleby Line in Milton in the west to the Scarborough-Pickering Townline in the east, where it continues east into Durham Region as Taunton Road, which itself extends 58 km (36 mi) across the length of Durham Region to its boundary with Northumberland County. It is most notable for being the north city limit of Toronto where it borders the southern limit of York Region along its eastern half.

York Region refers to Steeles Avenue as York Regional Road 95 but this use is only internal and there are no signs posted; as the street borders and is maintained by the City of Toronto. Through Peel and Halton Regions, the road is signed as Peel Regional Road 15 and Halton Regional road 8, respectively.

The combination of Steeles and Taunton Road is the only arterial road to cross almost the entire Greater Toronto Area without breaks or turnoffs.

== History ==
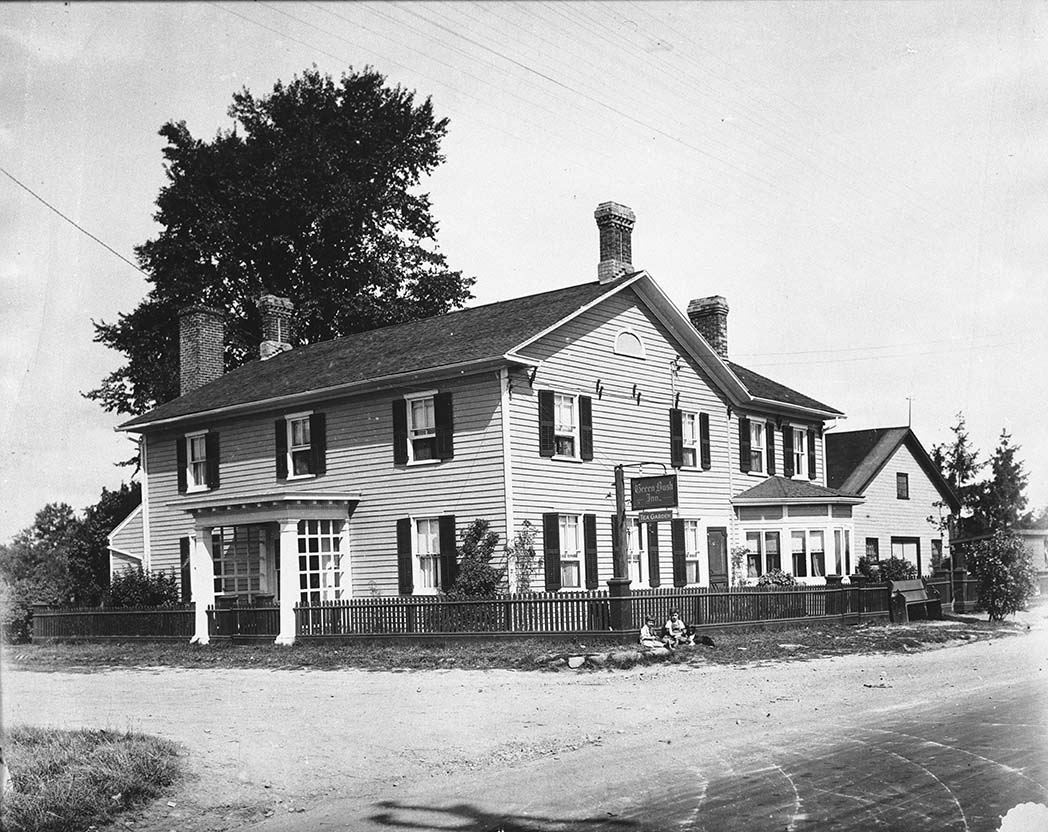
The Green Bush Inn at Yonge and Steeles; circa 1920

The street is named after Thomas Steele (1806–1877), the first proprietor of the Green Bush Inn on the northwest corner of the street's intersection with Yonge Street in Vaughan Township. Thomas Steele also previously managed an Inn in Bond Head, Ontario. The street's name originally contained an apostrophe (before the 'S'), a suggestive of Steele's possession of the inn and land around the intersection, but it was dropped by the mid-20th century.

Steeles in Scarborough was once referred to as Scarborough Town Line from 1850 to 1953. The section west of Yonge (bordering Vaughan) was called Vaughan Town Line. Prior to 1967, Steeles Avenue was named Upper Base Line (Lower Base Line being Eglinton Avenue, which is still named as such) in Halton County.

Steeles became a division boundary in 1953 when the road, which was a common township boundary across the width of the-then York County between the more urban townships surrounding the old City of Toronto and the more rural ones farther north, was chosen as the northern boundary of the new Metropolitan Toronto, which was severed from the county that year. To the west in Peel County, it was also the southern boundary of Chinguacousy Township and the Town of Brampton and the northern boundary of Toronto Township (later the Town of Mississauga between 1968 and 1974) until the municipal restructuring of 1974 brought Steeles fully within Brampton when the new city limits were set to the south at the-then future Highway 407 corridor and the Canadian National Halton Subdivision.

A 1.5 kilometres (0.93 mi) stretch of Steeles Avenue will be widened from east of Tapscott Road to just east of Ninth Line is planned to begin in 2027.

== Route description ==
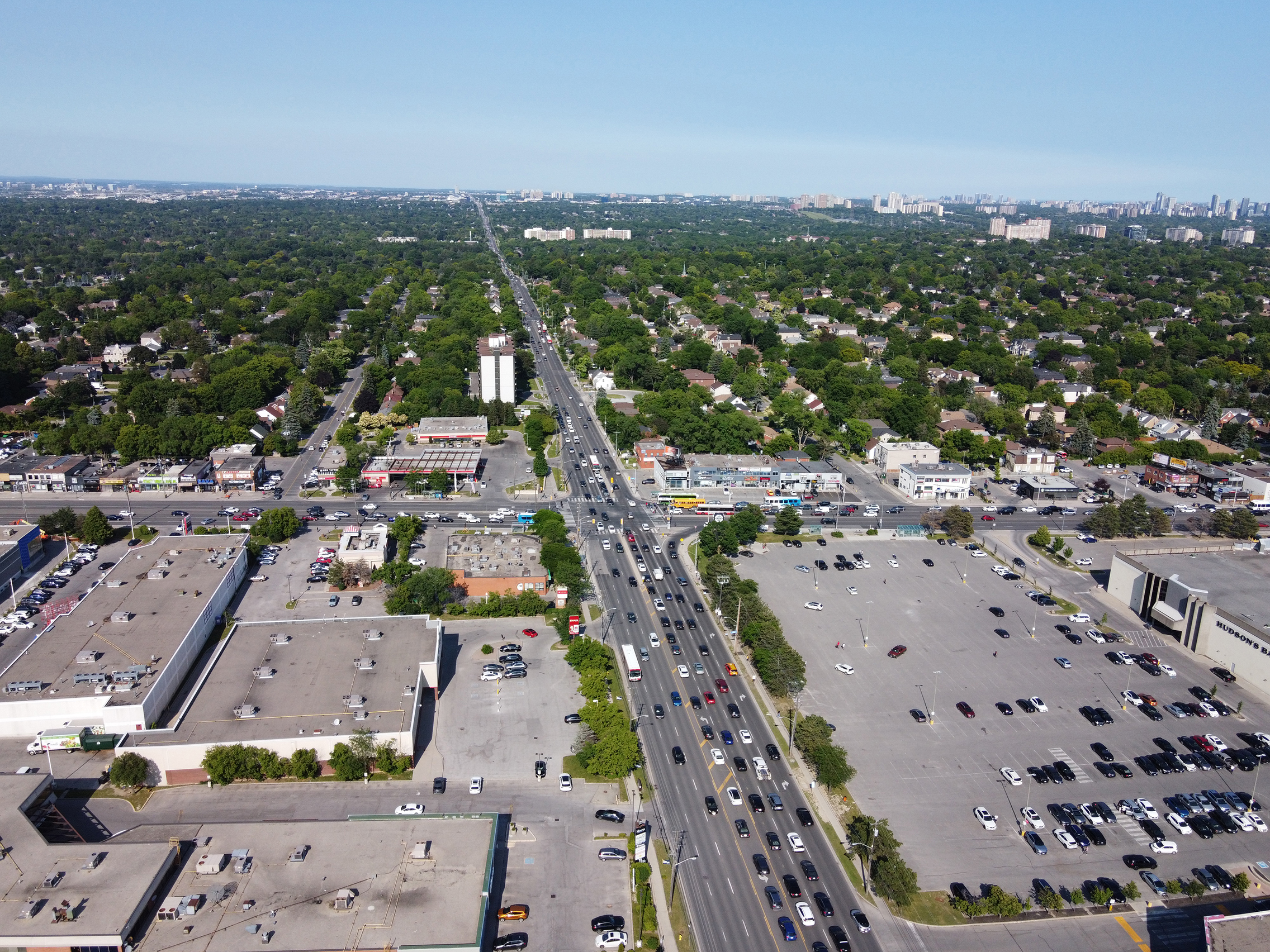
Steeles Avenue viewed from Yonge Street

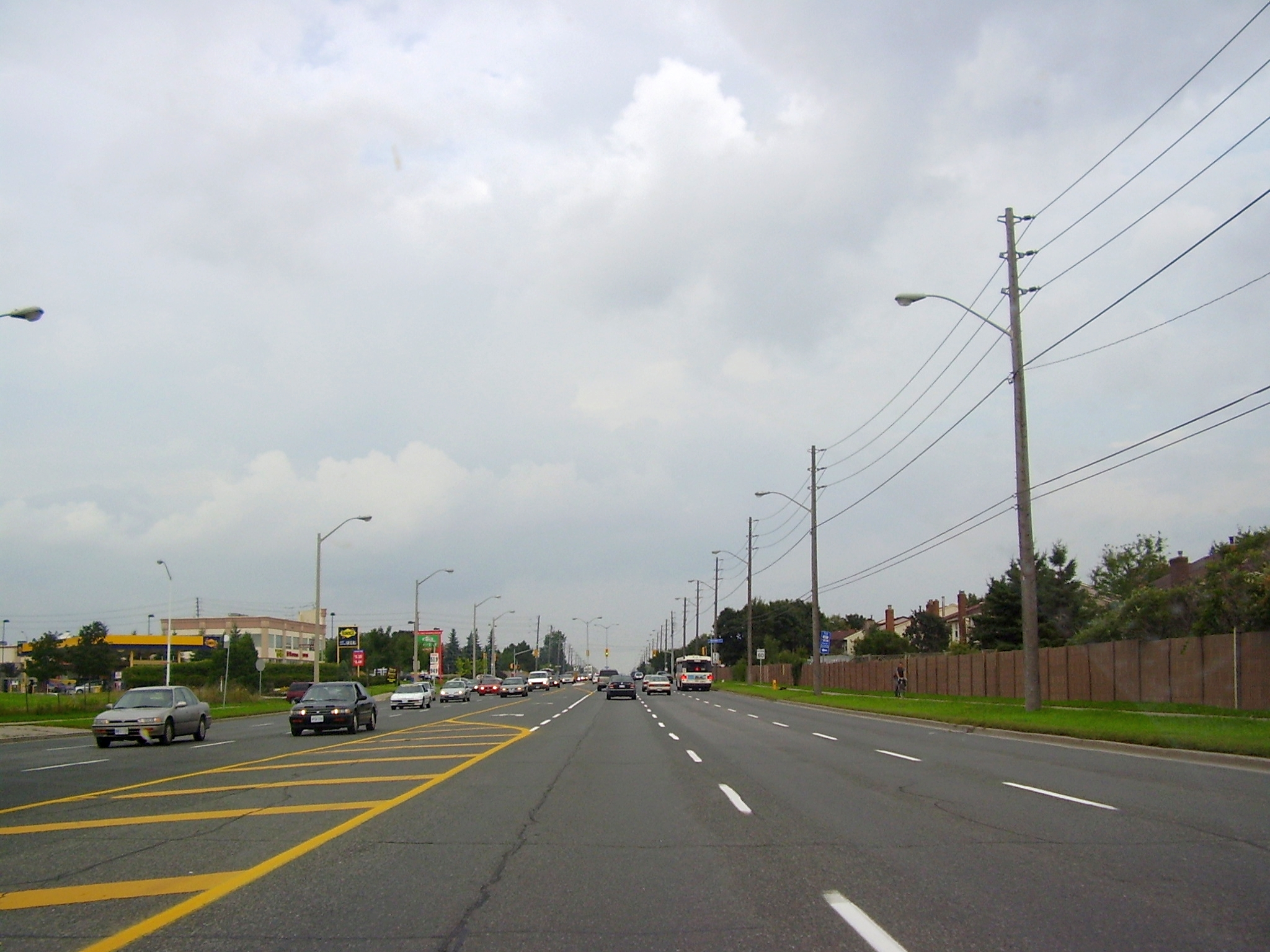
Steeles Avenue near the intersection of Warden Avenue

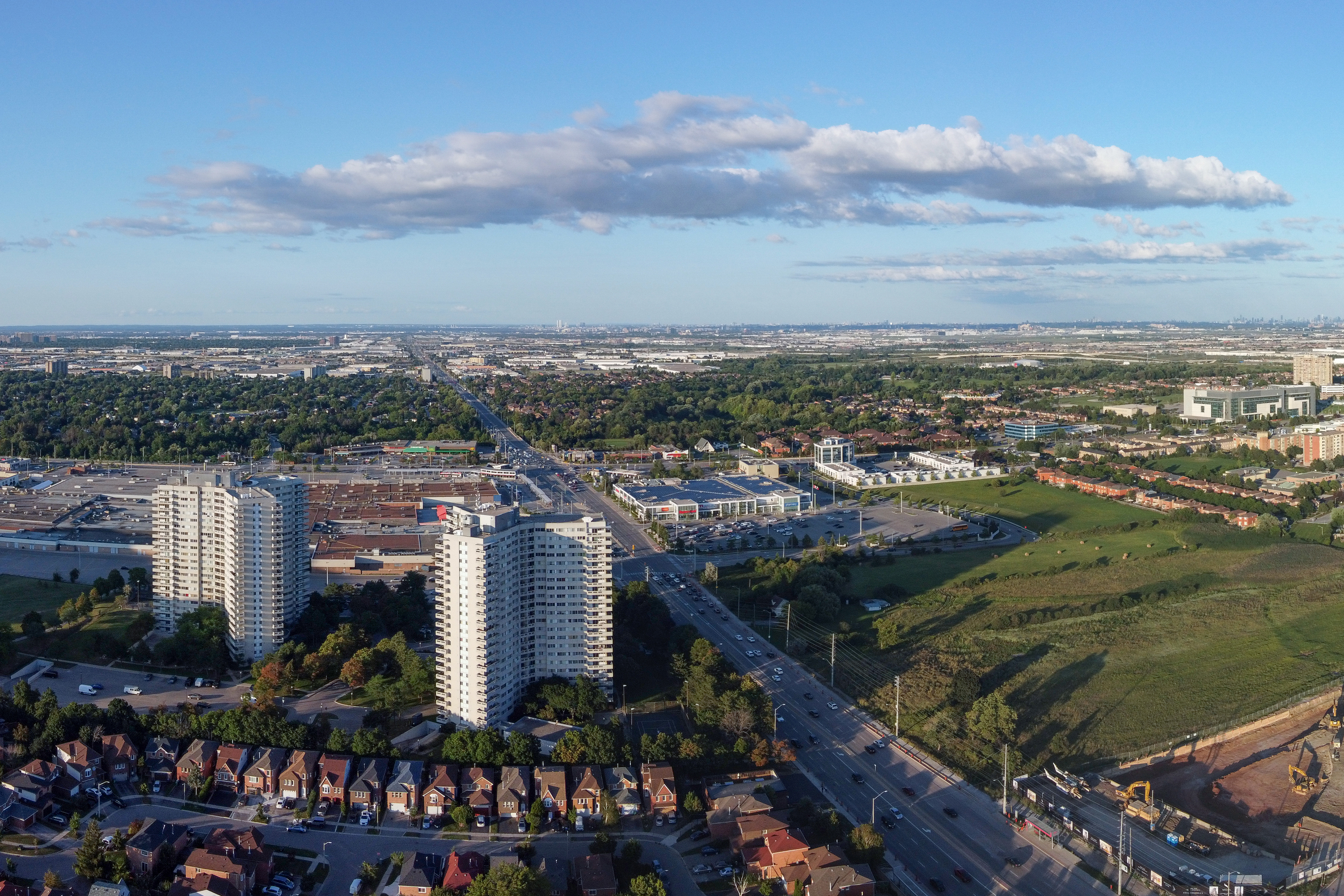
Steeles Avenue in Brampton, near Shoppers World Brampton

Starting from the east, the road begins at Scarborough-Pickering Town Line/York-Durham Line, although east of the town line, the road continues as Taunton Road or Durham Regional Road 4. Taunton Road continues as is until reaching Highway 35, where it becomes Concession Road 6, then after a turn, will become East Town Line, then to 6th Line, before ending at County Road 65.

Steeles is a two-lane rural road until east of Markham Road. It becomes a four lane suburban road with bicycle lanes on each side between Markham and Kennedy Roads, six lanes from Kennedy to Victoria Park Avenue, and eight lanes from Victoria Park to the interchange with Highway 404. West of there, it alternates between four and six lanes the rest of way to Albion Road. Like many other east–west arterial roads within Toronto and York Region, Steeles is divided into east and west segments by Yonge Street.

Although on the boundary between the two municipalities, the Toronto-York Region portion of the road is maintained by Toronto. As a result, limited planning authority is granted to Toronto over York Region for lands that is within 45 metres (148 ft) of Steeles; formalized through a 1974 agreement between Metropolitan Toronto (succeeded by the amalgamated City of Toronto) and York Region. For instance, Toronto city councillor David Shiner invoked the 1974 agreement to veto a proposed condo development that would replace the Shops on Steeles mall. Due to an ongoing dispute on the widening and maintenance costs of Steeles, York Region's proposed Markham Bypass to Morningside Avenue has been stalled.

The areas around the street in Toronto and York Region consists of farmland (within the Rouge National Urban Park) in the east, a mix of commercial and residential in the middle, and industrial zones near the west.

West of Albion Road, Steeles Avenue continues into Brampton in Peel Region, where it is also designated as Peel Regional Road 15. Like the section in Toronto, Steeles Avenue has east–west segments, this time on either side of Hurontario and Main Streets. Steeles Avenue continues into Halton Region, where it is also designated as Halton Regional Road 8, through the town of Milton, crossing Highway 401 (no interchange) and ending at Appleby Line at a T intersection.

Originally, the road had a second section west of the height of the Niagara Escarpment (the location of the Crawford Lake Conservation Area), which ran from just east of Guelph Line west to the Milborough Townline on the boundary between Milton and Hamilton, but this section was renamed to Conservation Road and is thus no longer part of Steeles.

== Public transit ==
=== Toronto and York Region ===
The street is served by the Toronto Transit Commission (TTC) bus routes 53 Steeles East and 60 Steeles West, which both turn south at Yonge Street to terminate at Finch station on the eastern portion of the Line 1 Yonge–University subway. There are also two counterpart express bus routes operating during rush hours; 953 Steeles East Express and 960 Steeles West Express, as well as one overnight Blue Night route; 353 Steeles. York Region Transit (YRT) routes 88 Bathurst and 91 Bayview also travel along a portion of Steeles between Bathurst Street and Bayview Avenue respectively to and from Yonge Street en route to the Finch Bus Terminal adjacent to Finch station.

Several TTC bus routes provide service on north-south arterial roads in York Region that continue north from Toronto on a contractual basis, with Steeles being the fare zone boundary. However, the extra fare (for YRT) is waived and there are free transfer privileges with YRT for passengers paying with Presto, credit, or debit cards under a fare integration policy, although double fares are still charged for riders paying with cash.

The western (University) portion of the Line 1 Yonge–University subway has a station at Steeles named Pioneer Village, which was named after the nearby Black Creek Pioneer Village (since renamed The Village at Black Creek) heritage museum, as opposed to simply having a West designation as is the practice on most of the western section of the line. Unlike TTC-contracted bus routes however, no extra fare was ever charged when crossing Steeles to and from stations in Vaughan to simplify fare collection. An extension of the eastern (Yonge) branch is currently under construction north from Finch, and will include a station at Steeles.

=== Brampton ===
Brampton Transit routes 11 Steeles, 51 Hereford, and 511 Züm Steeles (bus rapid transit) run along much of the street in Brampton. The 11A branch of route 11 serves the street from Brampton Gateway Terminal to Humber College, while limited trips along route 11 and all 511 Züm Steeles trips run from Lisgar GO Station to Humber College. Route 51 Hereford serves the route west of Brampton Gateway Terminal to Mississauga Road. In addition, several other routes run along it for shorter stretches.

=== Milton ===
Milton Transit operates 2 routes that run along part of Steeles Avenue in Milton: 1 Industrial and 2 Main. Route 2 runs between Lawson Road and Thompson Road before going south. Route 1 is split into 3 branches, 1A, 1B and 1C. Routes 1A and 1B are separate directions in a loop, running on Steeles between Industrial Drive and Ontario Street and Thompson Road and Esquesing Line while route 1C operates on the section of Steeles between Martin Street and Ontario Street.

== Canadian Automobile Association rating ==
Steeles Avenue was listed by the CAA as the "worst road in Ontario" for 2006, and as the fifth-worst road in October 2007. In October 2008, it was again crowned the worst road in Ontario. Reasons include potholes and general quality of surface. Soon after the results of CAA's survey were made public, some parts of the road between Dufferin Street and Bayview Avenue were resurfaced. The results of the 2009 survey listed Steeles as Ontario's worst road, for the second year in a row.

However, in 2010, Steeles Avenue was resurfaced from Yonge Street to Markham Road, with the funds coming from the federal infrastructure stimulus program, and the CAA named it the "Best Road in Ontario".

== Landmarks ==
Landmarks and notable sites along Steeles from west to east

Landmark	Cross street	Notes	Image
Crawford Lake Conservation Area	West of Guelph Line	Former separate section of Steeles west of Guelph Line now known as Conservation Road	
Rattlesnake Point	Appleby Line	Present western terminus of Steeles	
Toronto Premium Outlets	Trafalgar Road	First Premium Outlets Center in Canada	
Sheridan College-Davis Campus	McLaughlin Road	Sheridan's largest campus, educating nearly 8,000 students.	
Shoppers World Brampton	Hurontario Street / Main Street	Brampton divide between Steeles West and Steeles East	
Bramalea GO Station	Bramalea Road		
Wet 'n' Wild Toronto	Finch Avenue	Canada's largest waterpark	
Black Creek Pioneer Village	Jane Street		
Pioneer Village station	Northwest Gate		
York University	Keele Street, Founders Road, Murray Ross Parkway	Toronto's second largest university	
Centerpoint Mall	Yonge Street	Formerly Towne and Country Square; Toronto/York Region divide between Steeles West and Steeles East	
Brebeuf College School	Conacher Drive		
Pacific Mall	Kennedy Road	Largest indoor Chinese Asian mall in North America	
Market Village	Kennedy Road, Redlea Avenue	Former shopping centre which closed in 2018. To be replaced by Remington Centre.	
Splendid China Mall	Kennedy Road, Redlea Avenue	Former Canadian Tire store	
Milliken GO Station	Old Kennedy Road, Silverstar Boulevard	Station moved across the street from Markham to Toronto	
Cedar Brae Golf & Country Club	Staines Road	Road enters Rouge Park. Formerly Cedar Brook Golf and Country Club c. 1922	
Menno-Reesor House (6461 Steeles Avenue East)	Littles Road	Home and barn will be renovated as part of the Toronto Wildlife Centre development	

== Neighbourhoods and communities ==
Steeles Avenue passes through numerous neighbourhoods (and two rural communities) across the municipalities it runs though:

=== Halton Region ===
- Peru (Milton)
- Dorset Park (Milton)
- Hornby (Halton Hills)

=== Brampton ===
- Churchville
- Peel Village
- Bramalea

=== Toronto/York Region ===
- Claireville (Toronto)
- Rexdale (Toronto)
- Woodbridge (Vaughan)
- Humber Summit (Toronto)
- Black Creek (Toronto)
- Concord (Vaughan)
- Thornhill (split between Vaughan and Markham)
- Newtonbrook (Toronto)
- Bayview Woods-Steeles (Toronto)
- Milliken (split between Toronto and Markham)
- Armadale (split between Toronto and Markham)
- Morningside Heights (Toronto)
- Rouge (Toronto)

== Proposed rapid transit ==
A rapid transit corridor along Steeles Avenue in Toronto and York Region, operated by the Toronto Transit Commission, has been proposed for completion in The Big Move, Metrolinx's transportation plan for the Greater Toronto Area. It has not been determined if this corridor would be a bus rapid transit or a light rail transit line.
