= Pacific Mall =

Shopping centre in Markham, Canada

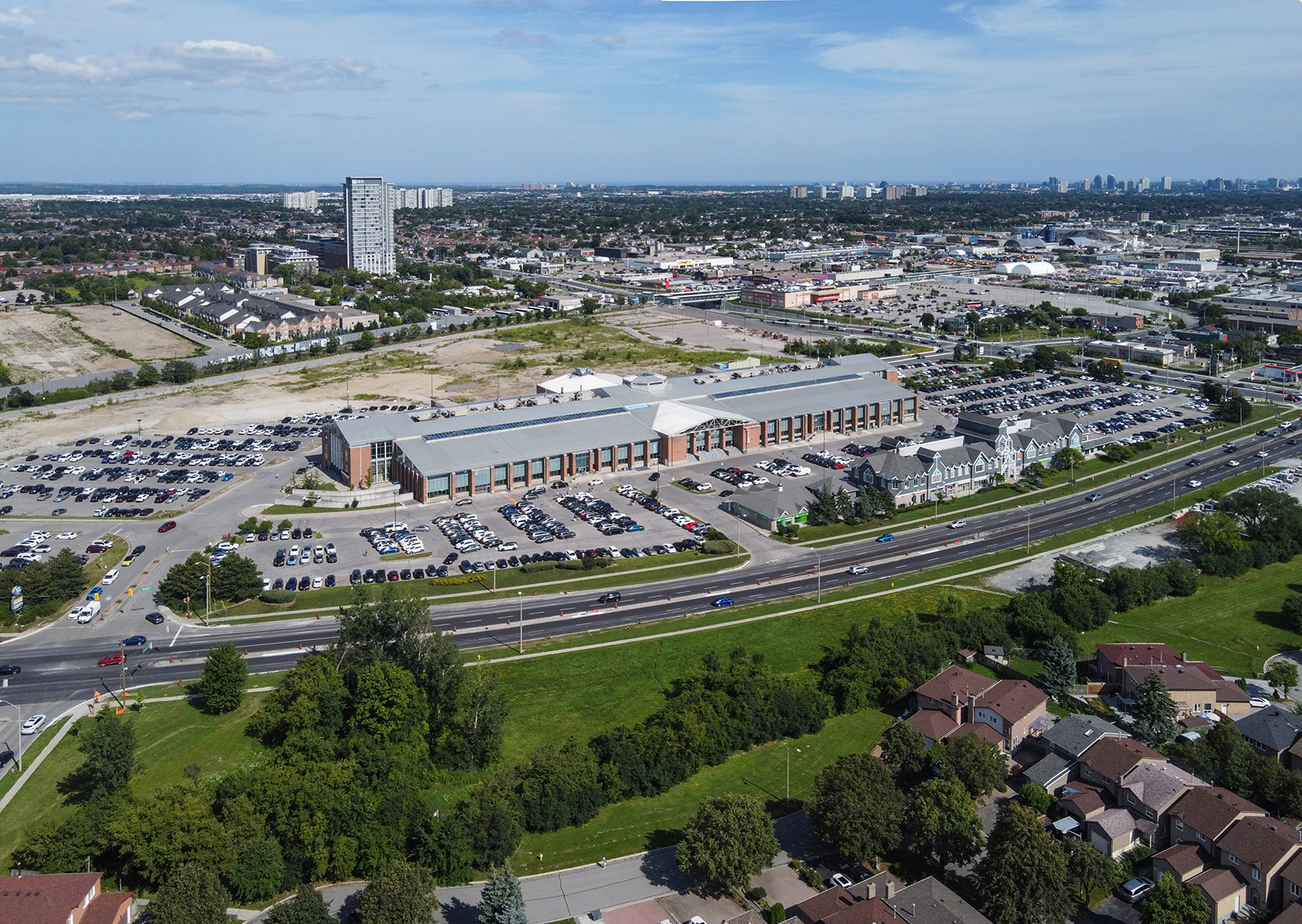
- Aerial view of Pacific Mall
- Location: Markham, Ontario, Canada
- Coordinates: 43°49′35″N 79°18′23″W
- Opened: 1996 or 1997
- Developer: The Torgan Group
- Owner: Pacific Mall Condominium Corporation
- Num. of stores: 450
- Floor area: 270,000 sq ft (25,084 m^{2})
- Floors: 3
- Public transit: 43A TTC Kennedy; 53 TTC Steeles East; 953 TTC Steeles East Express; YRT Route 8 Kennedy; GO Transit Milliken Station (Stouffville Line)

Chinese name
- Traditional Chinese: 太古廣場
- Simplified Chinese: 太古广场
Transcriptions
Standard Mandarin
- Hanyu Pinyin: Tàigǔ Guǎngchǎng
Yue: Cantonese
- Yale Romanization: taai3 gu2 gwong2 cheung4

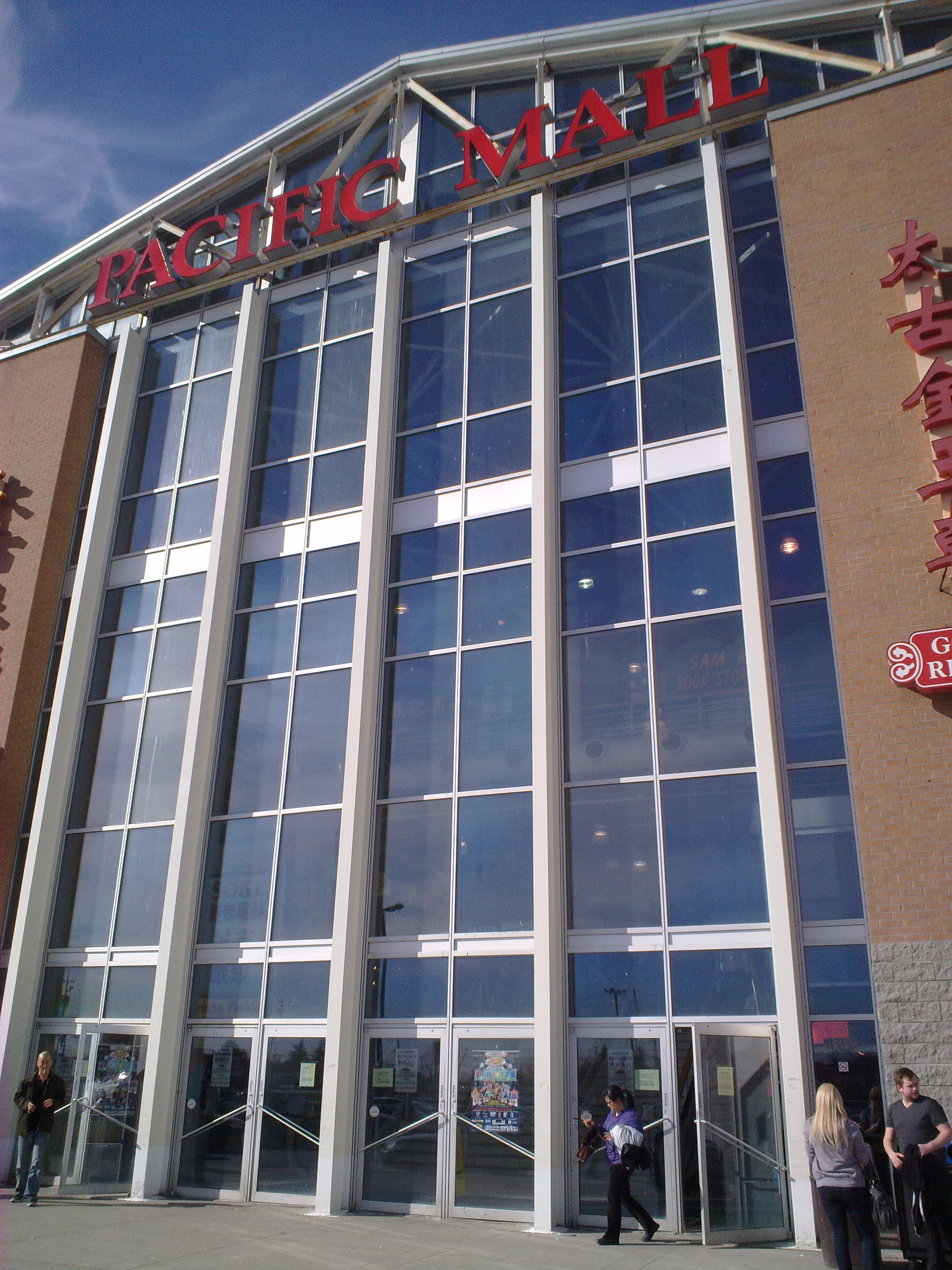
Main entrance

Pacific Mall is an East Asian shopping mall in Markham, Ontario, Canada. It is the largest indoor East Asian shopping mall in North America and has been reported as the largest East Asian shopping mall in the Western world. The mall is located on the northeast corner of Steeles Avenue and Kennedy Road, along the city limits with Toronto. Opened in the mid-1990s amid a period of significant Chinese immigration to Canada, the mall operates as a condominium corporation with 450 individual units. The mall also includes Heritage Town, a food court and market that functions as a notable tourist destination in the Greater Toronto Area.

The Remington Centre, a proposed shopping mall first announced in 2005, would occupy the site formerly held by Market Village, a now-defunct mall adjacent to Pacific Mall. The expansion would see the construction of a structure that would bring the combined size of the malls to 1,000,000 square feet (90,000 m^{2}), though the project has faced numerous delays.

Pacific Mall is further noted as a location for the sale of counterfeit goods; stores in Pacific Mall have been raided multiple times by the Royal Canadian Mounted Police, and in 2018 the mall was listed as a 'notorious market' by the Office of the United States Trade Representative.

== History ==
=== Prior use ===
Pacific Mall is built on the site formerly occupied by Cullen Country Barns, a farm-themed complex opened in 1983 that housed shops, a theatre, and restaurants. The complex was established by Len Cullen, the founder of Cullen Gardens and Miniature Village in Whitby, Ontario, and consisted of two barn wings with gambrel roofs and a concrete silo. None were historic structures dating back to the time when the site was a working farm, but they were acquired by Cullen and moved from Pickering, Ontario, to Markham in the 1970s. A fire damaged part of the complex in 1988, and it was demolished in 1994; some portions of the former Market Village, a shopping complex adjacent to Pacific Mall, mimicked the Cullen complex.

=== Development ===
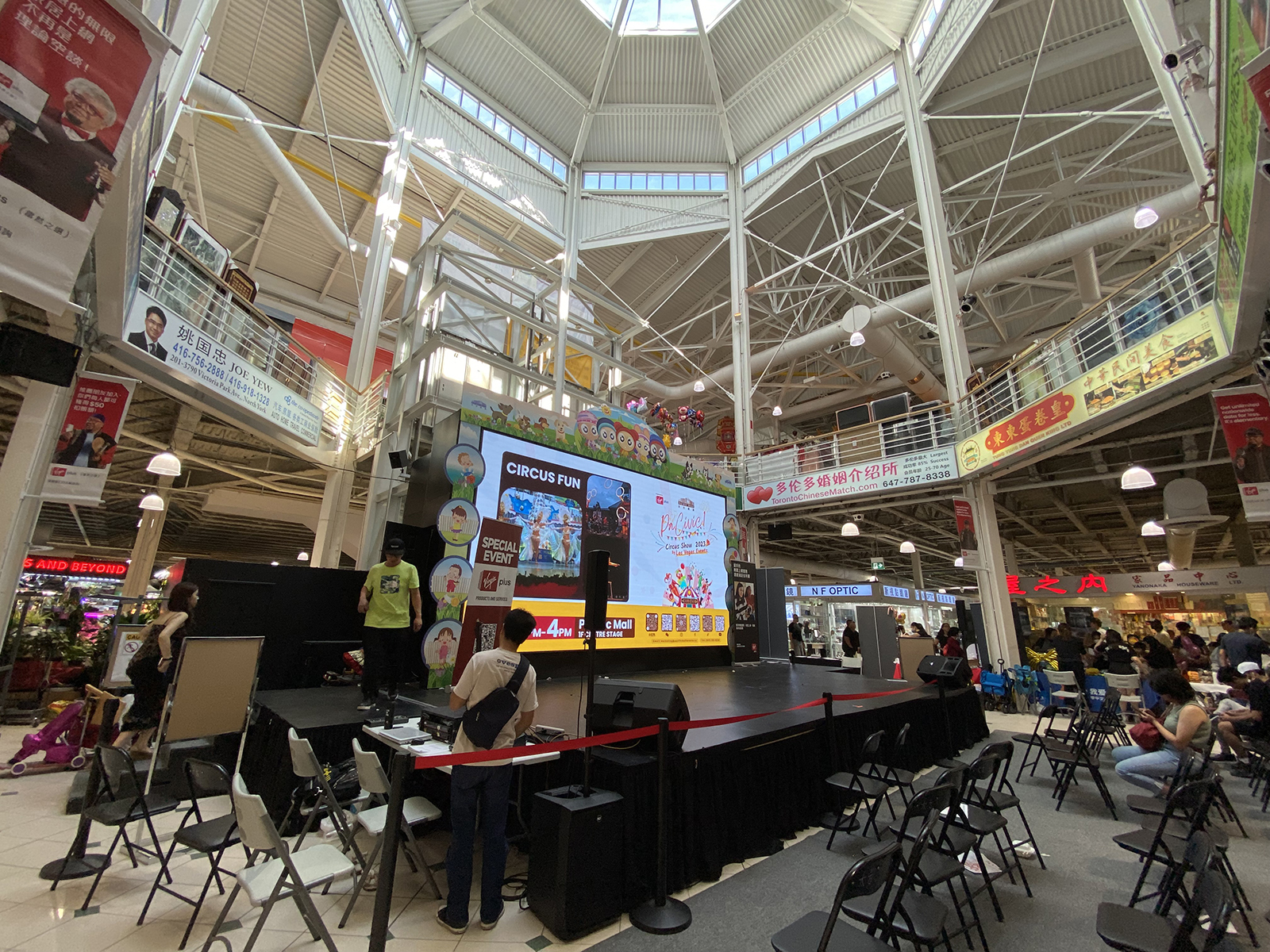
Mall atrium

Planning for Pacific Mall began in the late 1980s amid the formation of Chinese immigrant communities in suburban Toronto and a flourishing of ethnic malls in Markham, Richmond Hill, and Scarborough. The mall was planned and constructed amid the so-called "Hong Kong Tide" of the 1980s and 1990s, which saw an increase in immigration to Canada by highly educated, skilled migrants from Hong Kong who were frequently wealthy entrepreneurs and investors. This immigration was influenced by a range of factors, notably the handover of Hong Kong, and new Canadian open-door immigration policies that recruited based on merit rather than national origin. The passage of the Investment Canada Act, which sought to direct business migrants and foreign capital into Canada, is also noted as a factor. Of additional note is the implementation of the Canadian Immigrant Investor Program (CANIIP), which granted landed immigrant status to individuals with least CAD$500,000 in wealth who agreed to invest $250,000 in Canadian business ventures. As a result of this immigration, Markham's ethnic Chinese population rose 15 percent in 1995, resulting in nearly 30 percent of Markham's population being of Chinese origin; by 1999, there would be a total of 58 Asian shopping malls in Markham, Richmond Hill, and Scarborough.

A large-scale, indoor Asian mall to be built on the former site of Cullen Country Barns was formally proposed in 1993 by Torgan Group, an Israeli-Canadian development company, with the Fairchild Group as a partner. The mall would operate as a condominium corporation, where shop units are owned by individuals who determine the store's inventory and business hours, and can sell the unit at will. The developers of Pacific Mall claimed they were the first mall in North America to use this business model, though Pacific Mall was preceded by the condominium mall Chinatown Centre in West Chinatown, Toronto, which opened in 1989.

The mall's construction was opposed by some long-term residents of Markham, and was delayed numerous times from 1993 to 1996. Concerns were raised by Markham City Council over the impact the mall would have on parking and traffic volume, the style of the building that would replace Cullen Country Barns, and challenges in dealing with multiple owners in a condo-style mall. The Council commissioned an independent study on retail condominiums by John Winter and Associates, which concluded that retail condos are a positive means of diversifying developments. Pacific Mall's application underwent a nine-month review, with a building permit granted in May 1995.

Historian Erica Allen-Kim argues that Pacific Mall was "a weathervane for Markham's ongoing transformation from a rural township to an ethnoburb." Then-deputy mayor of Markham Carole Bell received criticism for her statement that "everything's going Chinese" in response to the proliferation of ethnic malls. She attempted to implement by-laws that would have forbid the rezoning of industrial areas for retail condominiums and made English-language signs mandatory on all structures. Then-mayor of Markham Don Cousens formed an advisory council of eleven Markham residents and three members of council to "address associated multicultural issues affecting planning decisions."

=== Opening and continued operation ===
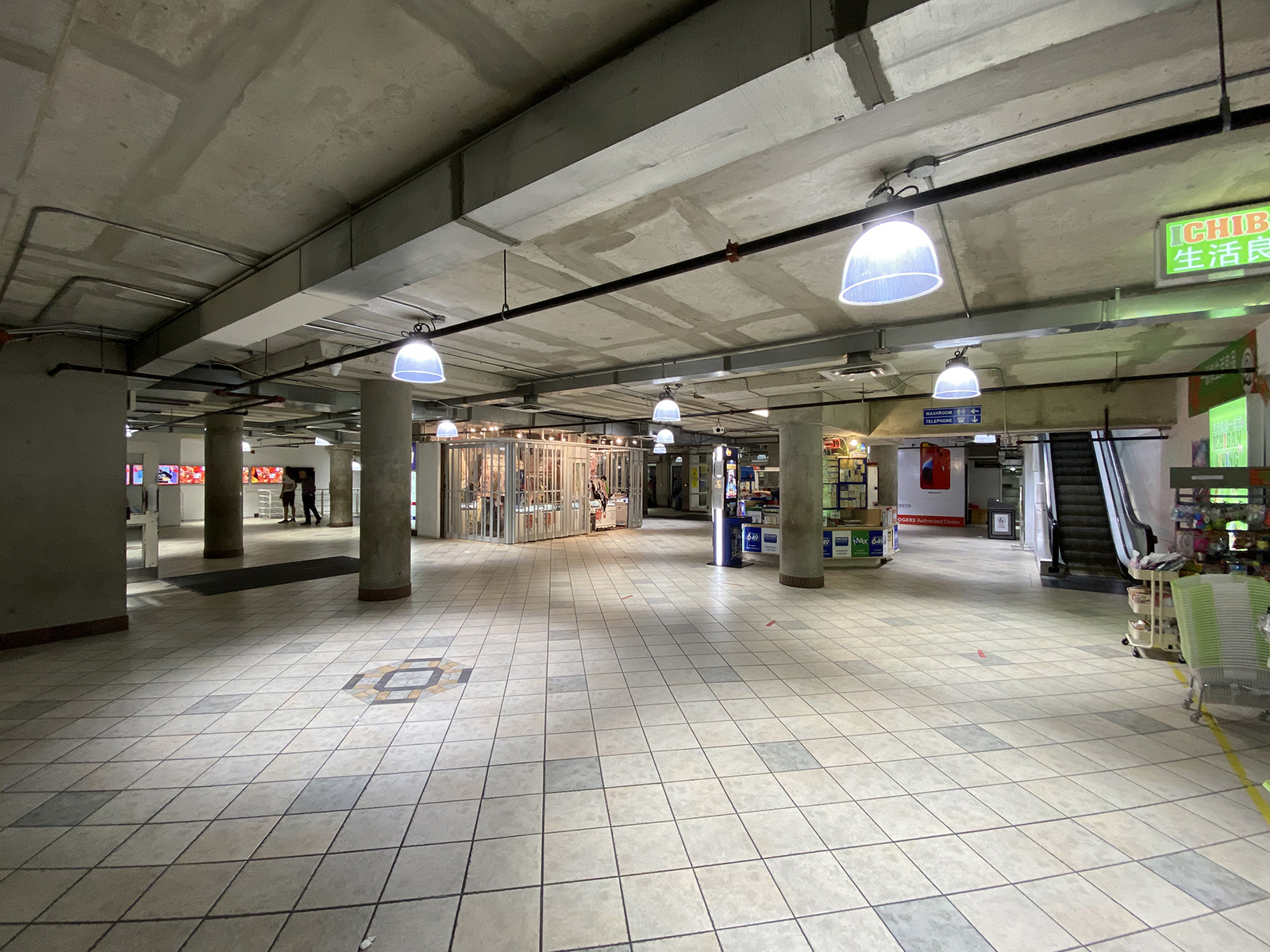
Mall basement

Sources report Pacific Mall as opening either in 1996 or 1997. Its Cantonese name, "太古廣場" (Tai Gu Gwong Cheung), is derived from Pacific Place in Hong Kong. At the time of its opening, Pacific Mall was the only mall of any kind of its scale in Scarborough and Markham. The mall's 715 retail condos were presold by 1993 for an average of $200 per square foot, and were priced from $59,800 to $249,800. A majority of condo buyers originated from Hong Kong, where Pacific Mall units were advertised extensively; many investors purchased units in Pacific Mall in order to fulfill the $250,000 investment requirement of CANIIP.

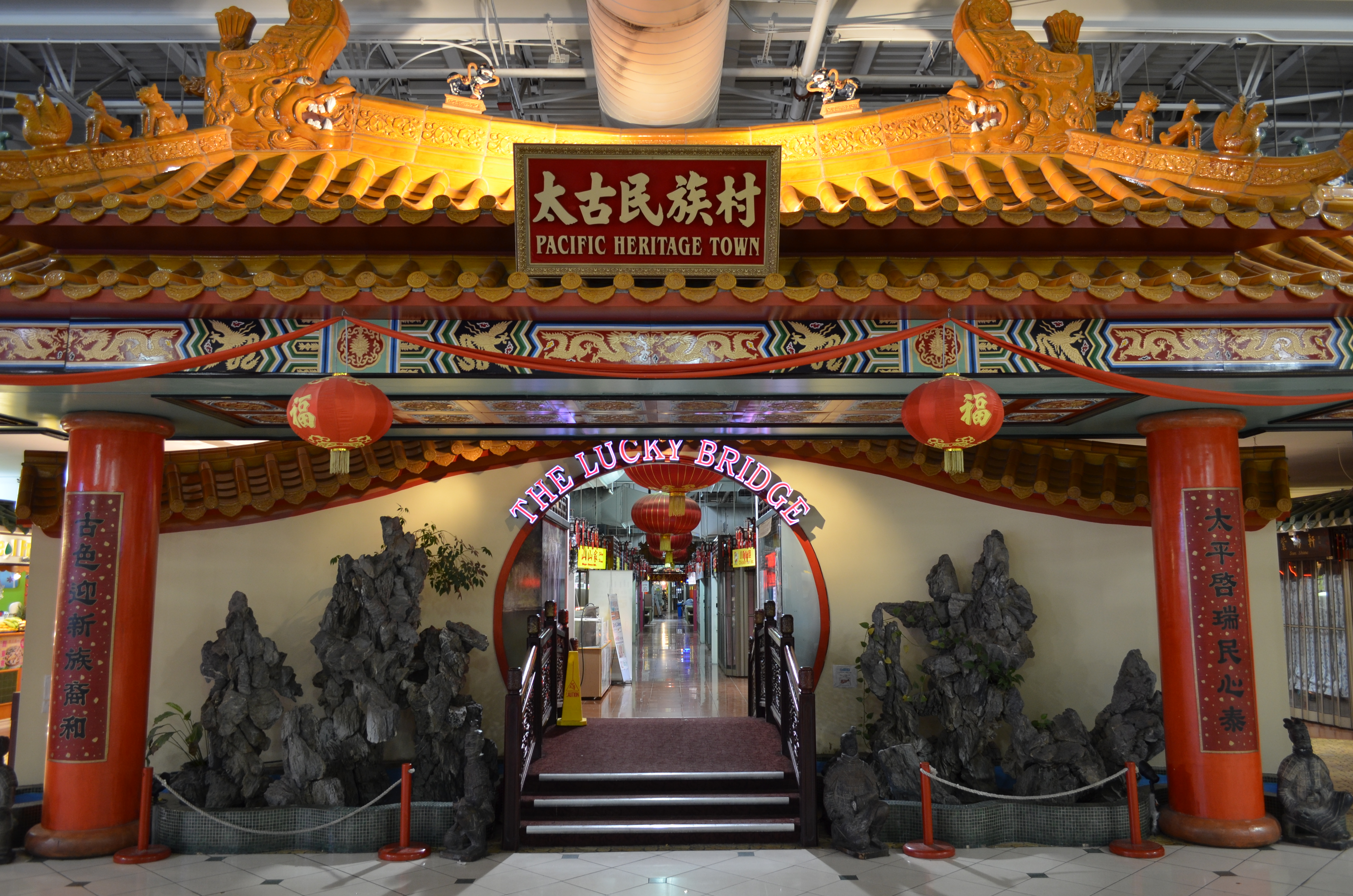
Entrance to Heritage Town, a renovated portion of the mall that was opened in 1999.

After business at the mall was initially slow, half of the unused second floor (which is owned and operated by Torgan Group, rather than condo leasees) was renovated in 1999 into Heritage Town, a food court and market that contains approximately 100 vendors. Aimed at attracting tourists and non-Chinese customers, Torgan Group commissioned artists and sculptors in China to make custom decorations for Heritage Town, including a large bas-relief of a dragon, 300 lanterns, an emperor's chair, a wood-work bridge, and terracotta soldiers. Heritage Town was successful in attracting additional business, prompting the mall to seek and be awarded designation as a Canadian Tourist Attraction. As such, Pacific Mall is exempt from the Retail Business Holiday Act and is open year-round, including statutory holidays.

As demographics of Chinese migrants to Canada shifted in 2010s, and immigrants from mainland China form a greater proportion of Chinese immigrants, many businesses at Pacific Mall have opted to hire salespeople fluent in Cantonese, Mandarin, and English. Though stores in the mall are noted for having relatively high turnover, many stores continue to be operated by their initial Hong Kong-originating owners.

== Features ==
=== Stores ===
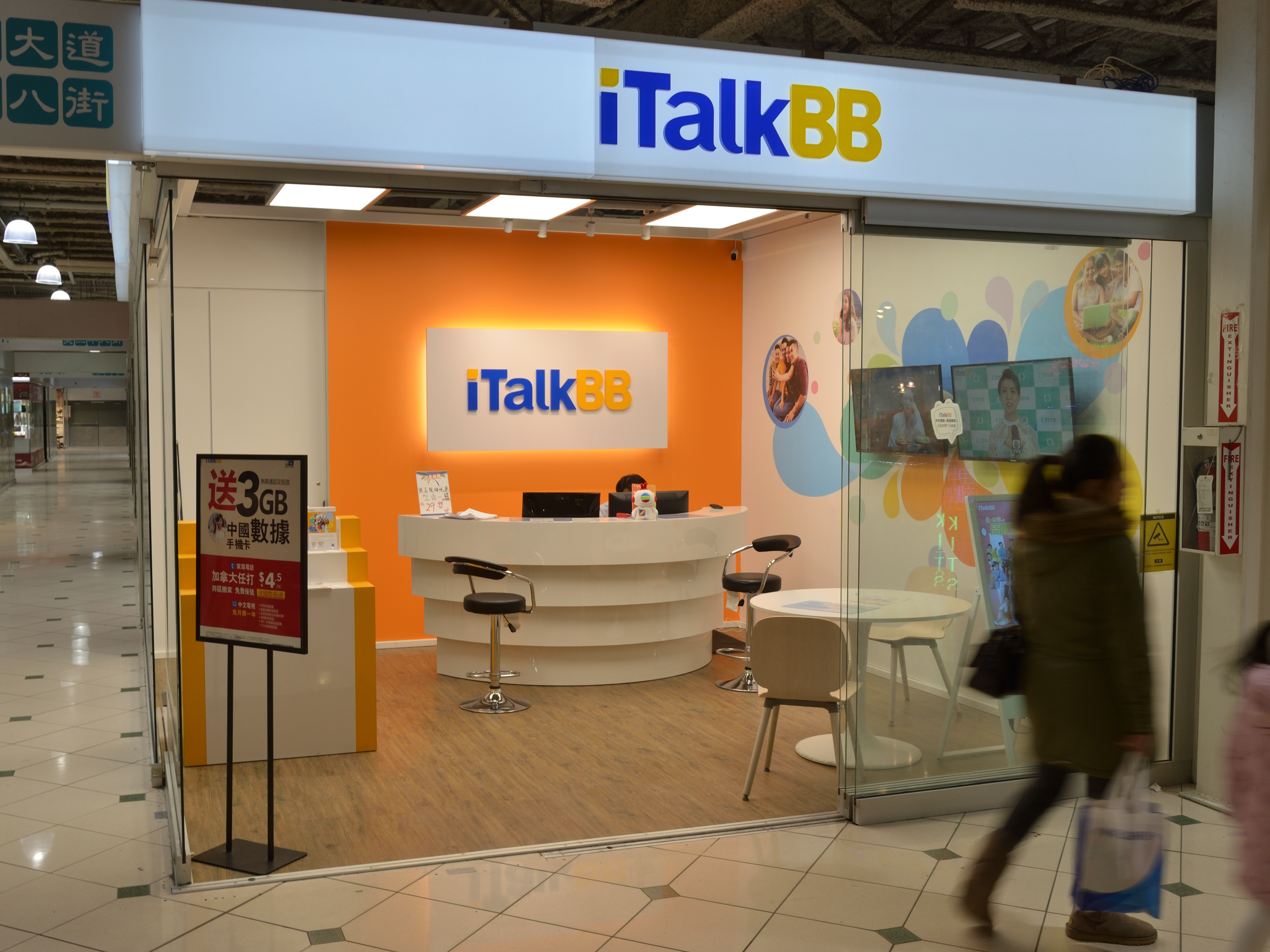
A store at Pacific Mall. The glass exterior walls and small interior square footage are defining features of the mall's condo-style units.

Pacific Mall is the largest indoor Asian shopping mall in North America and has been reported as the largest Asian shopping mall in the Western world. The mall is surrounded by an existing shopping plaza, including remnants of the former Market Village, which collectively encompass over 500 stores and 1,500 indoor and outdoor parking spaces. Stores range in size from 300 to 800 square feet (28 to 74 m^{2}) and sell a wide variety of goods, including traditional Chinese clothing, contemporary fashion, jewelry, herbal medicine, tea, electronics, mobile phones, ornaments, food, and printed material such as Chinese books, magazines and newspapers. A "diminishing number" of stores sell both legitimate and pirated CDs and DVDs; the decline in the sale of these goods can be attributed to regular police raids and the growing ubiquity of this material online.

As a condominium corporation, store owners elect representatives to form a management board, which oversees the operation of the mall.

=== Design ===
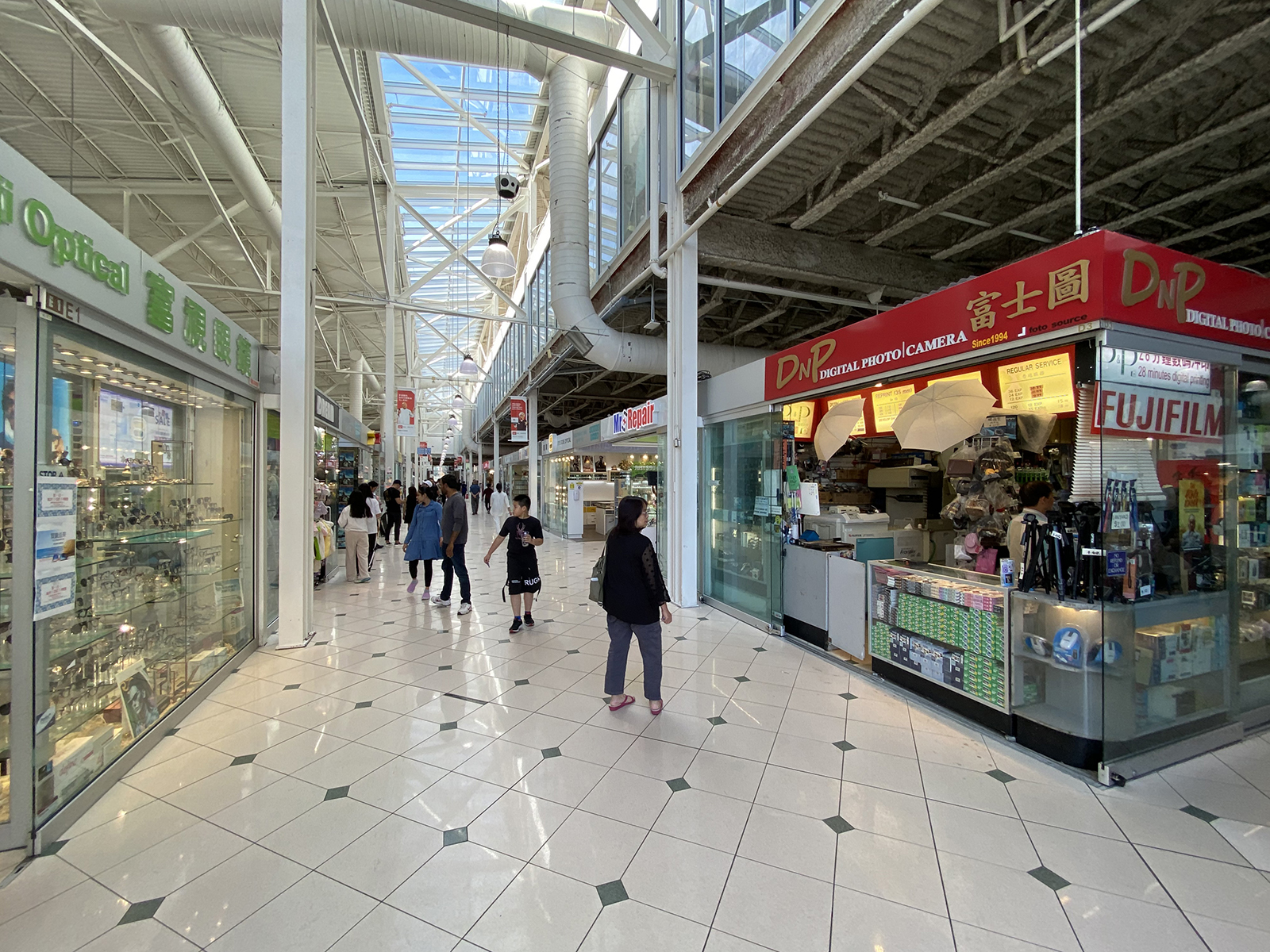
First floor interior

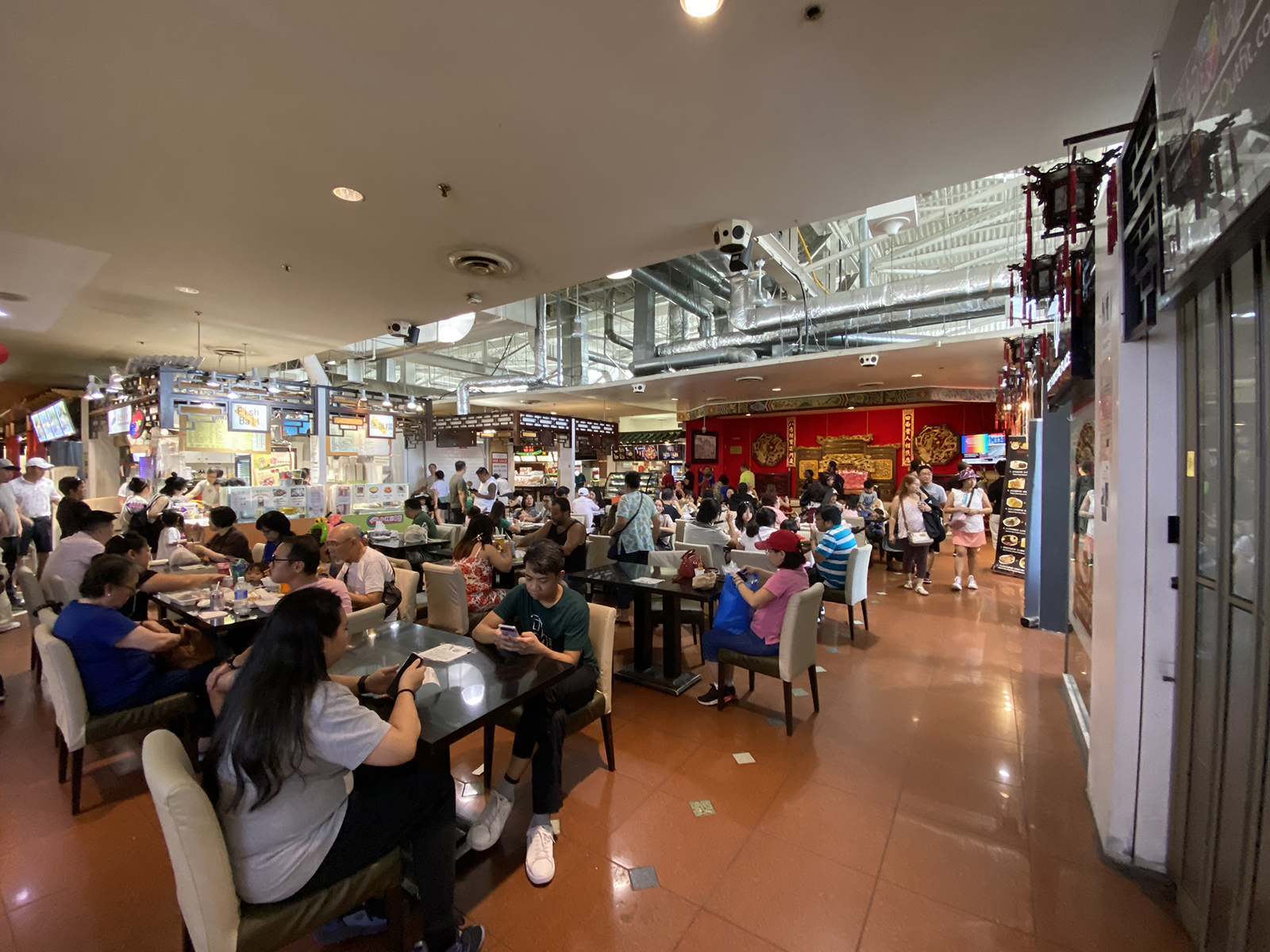
Heritage Town food court

Pacific Mall was designed by Wallman Clewes Bergman Architects, who built the structure in a combination of red brick, steel beams, and glass. The firm sought to create a "fabulous transparent building as different as possible from its surrounding," but rather than emulate Chinese architecture, sought to create a building that complimented Markham's suburban architecture. The mall's market-style interior with exposed roof trusses, pipes, and roof decks is described as "good representation of shed typology that is characterized by mass production, cost efficiency, and fast construction."

The mall has two floors and a basement level that leads to an underground parking lot. The hallways of the main floor are arranged in a grid, with each hallway given a street name: hallways running north–south are named after streets in Hong Kong, such as Hennessy Avenue, Hollywood Avenue, Pacific Avenue, Queen's Avenue, and Nathan Avenue, while hallways running east–west are numerical with numbers associated with affluence and luck in Cantonese, such as 218th Street and 188th Street. The centre of the mall contains an indoor courtyard with a cathedral dome ceiling and stage that hosts cultural programs and trade fairs. The second floor contains a food court, entertainment centre, medical offices, additional shops, and Heritage Town.

=== Future expansion ===
On June 15, 2005, Pacific Mall and Market Village announced a 400,000-square-foot (37,000-square-metre) expansion that would see the construction of additional retail space, a luxury hotel, condominiums, and a multi-level parking structure that would bring the combined size of the malls to 1,000,000 square feet (90,000 m^{2}). In 2009, the developers announced they would instead demolish Market Village and construct a new adjoining mall, the Remington Centre. The project has faced numerous delays; while the expansion plan was endorsed by Markham City Council in 2011, it requires additional approvals from the municipal government of Toronto and a majority of the ownership of Pacific Mall, 40 percent of which is composed of individual retailers.

== Controversies ==
=== Counterfeit merchandise ===
Pacific Mall is noted for its sale of counterfeit and pirated goods, including video games, movies, music, electronic devices, cosmetics, apparel, and fragrances. In January 2018, the mall was listed as a 'notorious market' by the Office of the United States Trade Representative, which noted that vendors in Pacific Mall “operate largely with impunity” despite requests for assistance from law enforcement. Pacific Mall management responded that they were "deeply disturbed" by the designation, and stated that they would give warnings to vendors who sold illicit goods.

The mall has been raided multiple times by the Royal Canadian Mounted Police (RCMP). On May 5, 2005, the RCMP seized over $800,000 worth of counterfeit goods, including 30,000 DVDs and 3,000 video games. On July 13, 2006, over 1,000 copies of pirated video game software were seized. On May 6, 2009, over 49,000 DVDs, 217 DVD burners, and over 100,000 blank DVDs were seized; four individuals were charged with multiple counts under the Copyright Act. On December 3, 2012, over $3 million worth of counterfeit goods were seized from Pacific Mall as a part of "Project Consumer Safety." On June 27, 2018, seven search warrants were executed for stores in Pacific Mall, resulting in the seizure of clothing, handbags, and cell phone accessories; eight individuals were charged with knowingly or recklessly making false representation to the public and selling or distributing goods in association with a trademark on May 28, 2019, as a result of the seizures and subsequent police investigation.

In March 2009, the RCMP teamed with the York Regional Police and commenced uniformed foot patrols in shopping malls located in south Markham, including Pacific Mall, in an effort to curb the sale of counterfeit items. In 2019, eight people were charged with selling counterfeit goods, and police seized thousands of items. As of April 2026, York Regional Police stated that there were no ongoing police investigations involving Pacific Mall retailers.

=== Traffic congestion ===
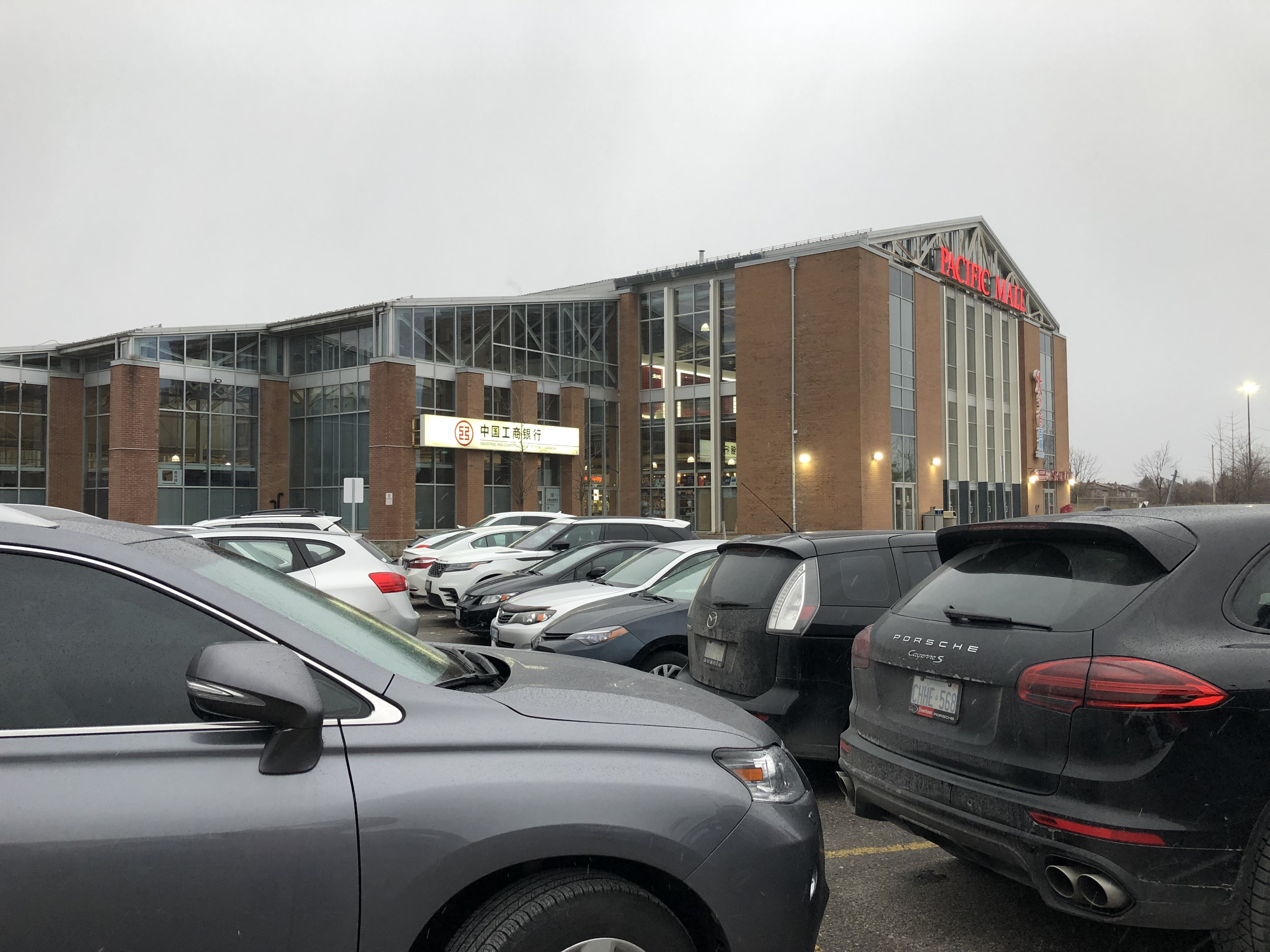
A filled parking lot outside Pacific Mall.

Pacific Mall is considered to be a major contributor to traffic congestion in southern Markham. The surrounding road infrastructure, which was built only to accommodate Market Village, is insufficient in accommodating the large volume of vehicle traffic that the mall receives. Pacific Mall also suffers from a parking shortage; though the mall contains an underground garage facility, no additional parking has been added since the mall's opening.

=== February 2009 shooting ===
On February 20, 2009, Kit Chen "Daniel" Cheong, 26, was shot and killed at the XSITE Cell Phones store in Pacific Mall. The primary suspect in the case was identified as Bryan Valentine Gardner from security camera footage; Gardner was arrested in London, Ontario, on September 2, 2010, 18 months after the incident. On August 28, 2013, Gardner was sentenced to life in prison, with no chance of parole until 2026.

== See also ==
- Splendid China Mall
- Chinese Canadians in the Greater Toronto Area
