= Market Village =

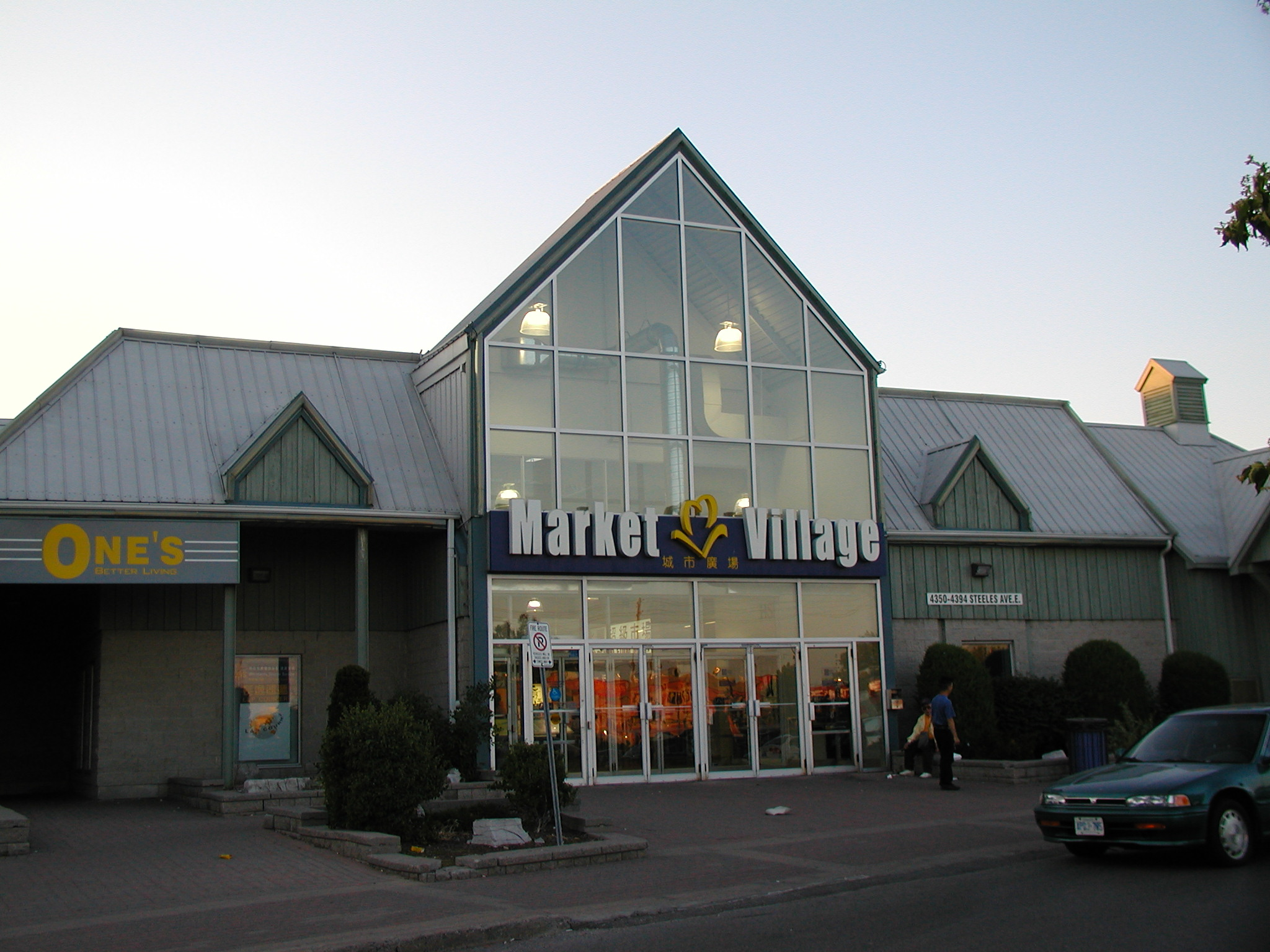
- Main entrance to Market Village in 2007
- Location: Markham, Ontario, Canada
- Coordinates: 43°49′31.8″N 79°18′12.6″W
- Address: 4390 Steeles Avenue East
- Opened: 1990
- Closed: March 1, 2018
- Developer: Cedarland Properties Limited (Remington Group)
- Owner: Remington Group
- Num. of stores: 170+ (Before closure)
- Floor area: 325,000 sq ft (30,193 m^{2})
- Floors: 2
- Website: marketvillage.net

Chinese name
- Traditional Chinese: 城市廣場
- Simplified Chinese: 城市广场
Transcriptions
Standard Mandarin
- Hanyu Pinyin: Chéngshì Guǎngchǎng
Yue: Cantonese
- Yale Romanization: sing4 si5 gwong5 coeng4

Market Village was a 325,000-square-foot (30,200 m^{2}) shopping mall in Markham, Ontario, Canada. Opened in 1990 and expanded in 1995, the mall closed on March 1, 2018.

== History ==
Market Village originally featured a "rustic" English main street theme upon its opening in 1990, however, due to being unpopular with customers, the mall was redeveloped and units within the mall eventually leased to individual entrepreneurs, and henceforth the mall acquired its nature of individual Chinese-Canadian businesses that eventually became the prototype of nearby Pacific Mall.

== Features ==
The mall was composed of nine buildings, which incorporated a combination of indoor and outdoor pedestrian malls. Most stores in Market Village were family-run, though there were several non-Chinese retailers, and some stores with ties to Hong Kong. Major anchor stores included two Chinese supermarkets, branches of the Bank of Montreal and HSBC Bank and McDonald's. At its peak, there were 170 stores and businesses in Market Village; roughly 120 businesses were still in operation in 2014.

== Proposed expansion and closure ==
On June 15, 2005, Pacific Mall and Market Village announced a 400,000 square foot (37,000 square meter) expansion that would add additional retail space, a luxury hotel, condominiums, and a multi-level parking structure. The expansion would see the entirety of Market Village be demolished and replaced with a new mall, the Remington Centre. The initial plan was endorsed by Markham City Council in 2011.

The expansion has faced delays due to concerns over traffic congestion from nearby property owners, as well as a pending environmental assessment and transit study by the City of Toronto government. Prior to Market Village's impeding closure, only minimal maintenance and repairs were being done; many businesses closed or moved after store leases expired and were not renewed. Market Village announced in early 2017 that it would be hosting its final Chinese New Year celebration, and formally closed on March 1, 2018. Demolition of Market Village officially began in October 2018 with west wing of mall demolished in December 2018. Some retailers from the mall have moved north to Denison Centre, a smaller plaza located at Kennedy Road and Denison Street. In 2019, the whole mall has been demolished.

== Gallery ==
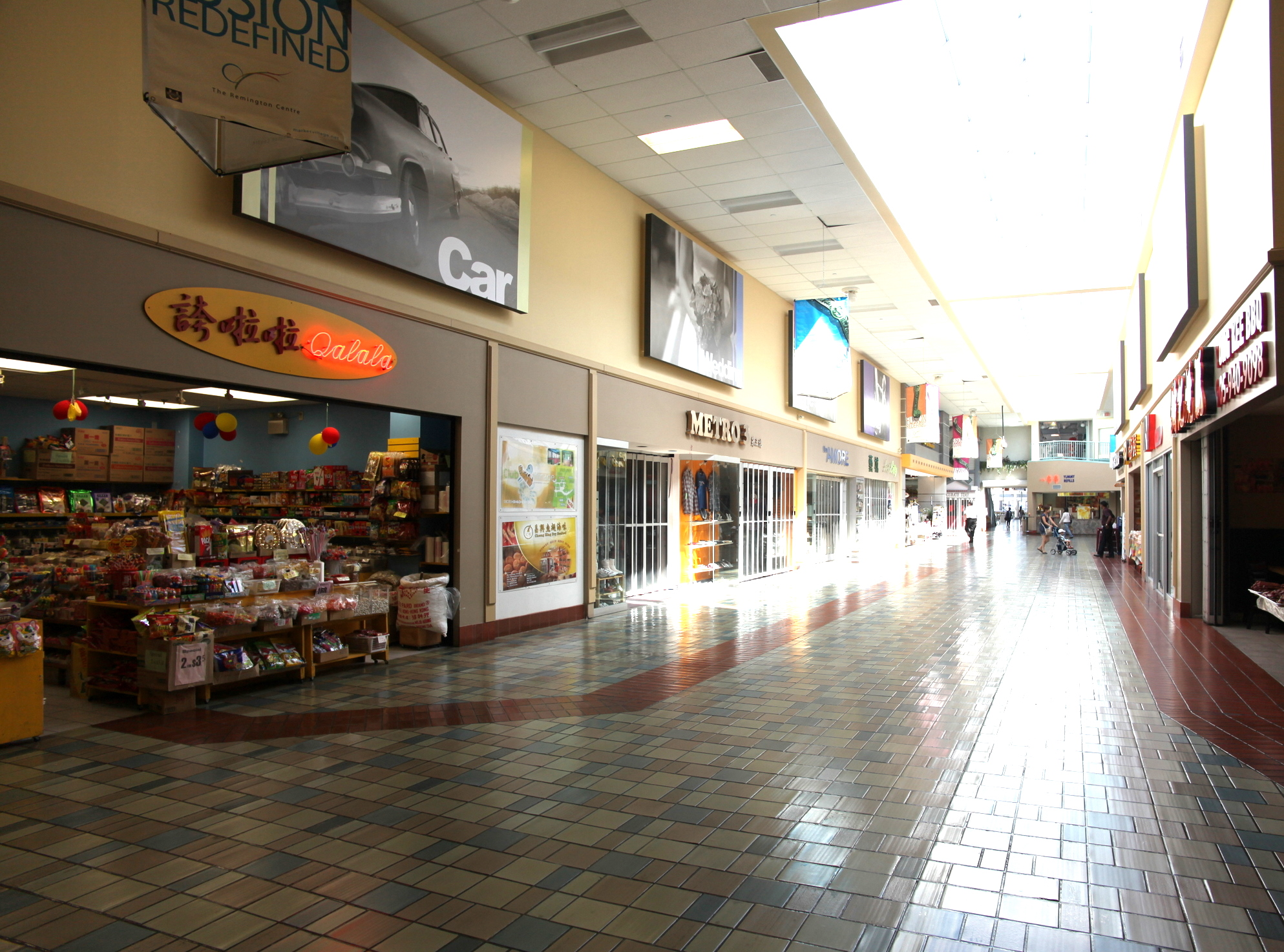
Facing northwest along the west corridor

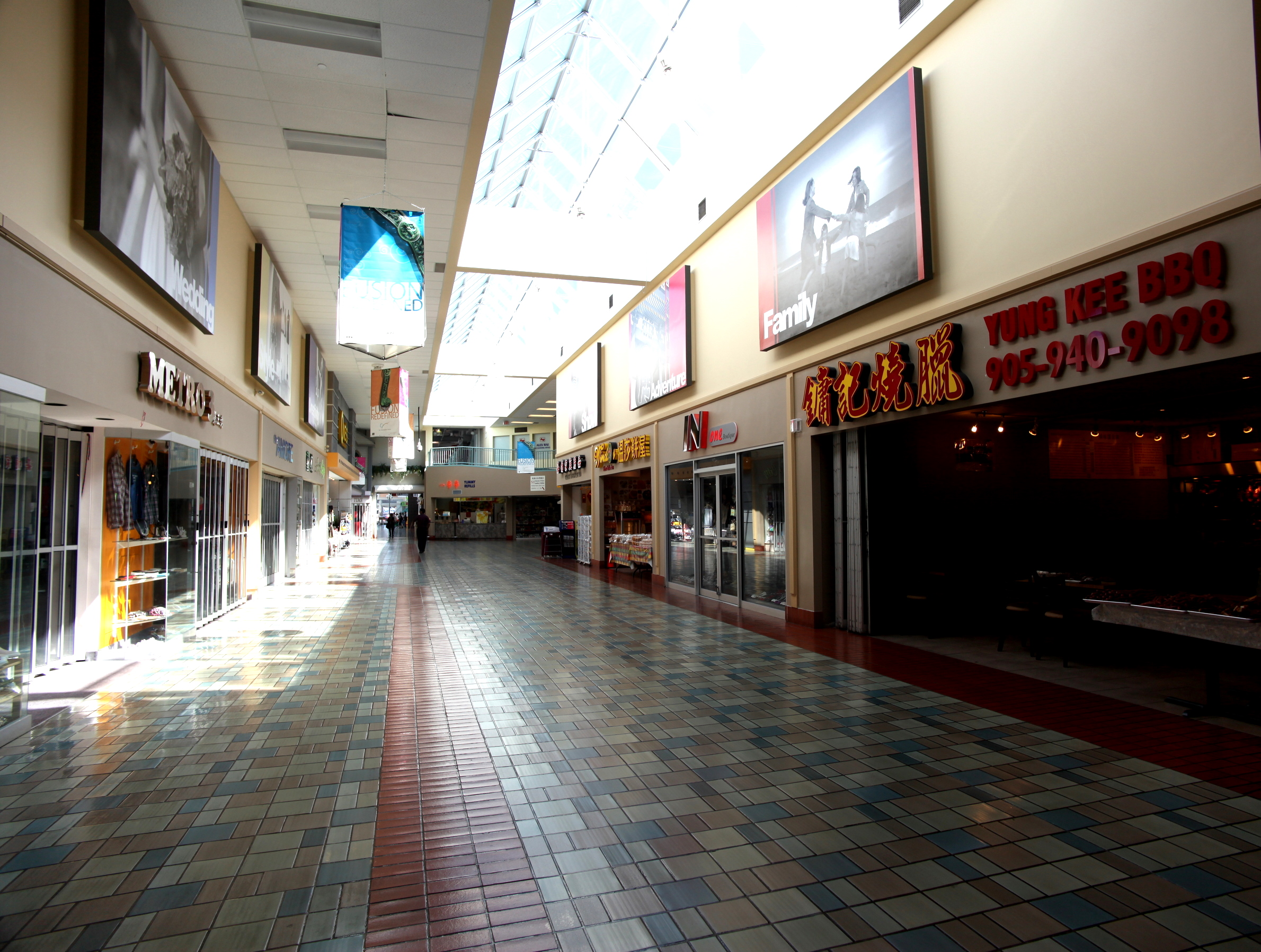
Facing northeast along the west corridor

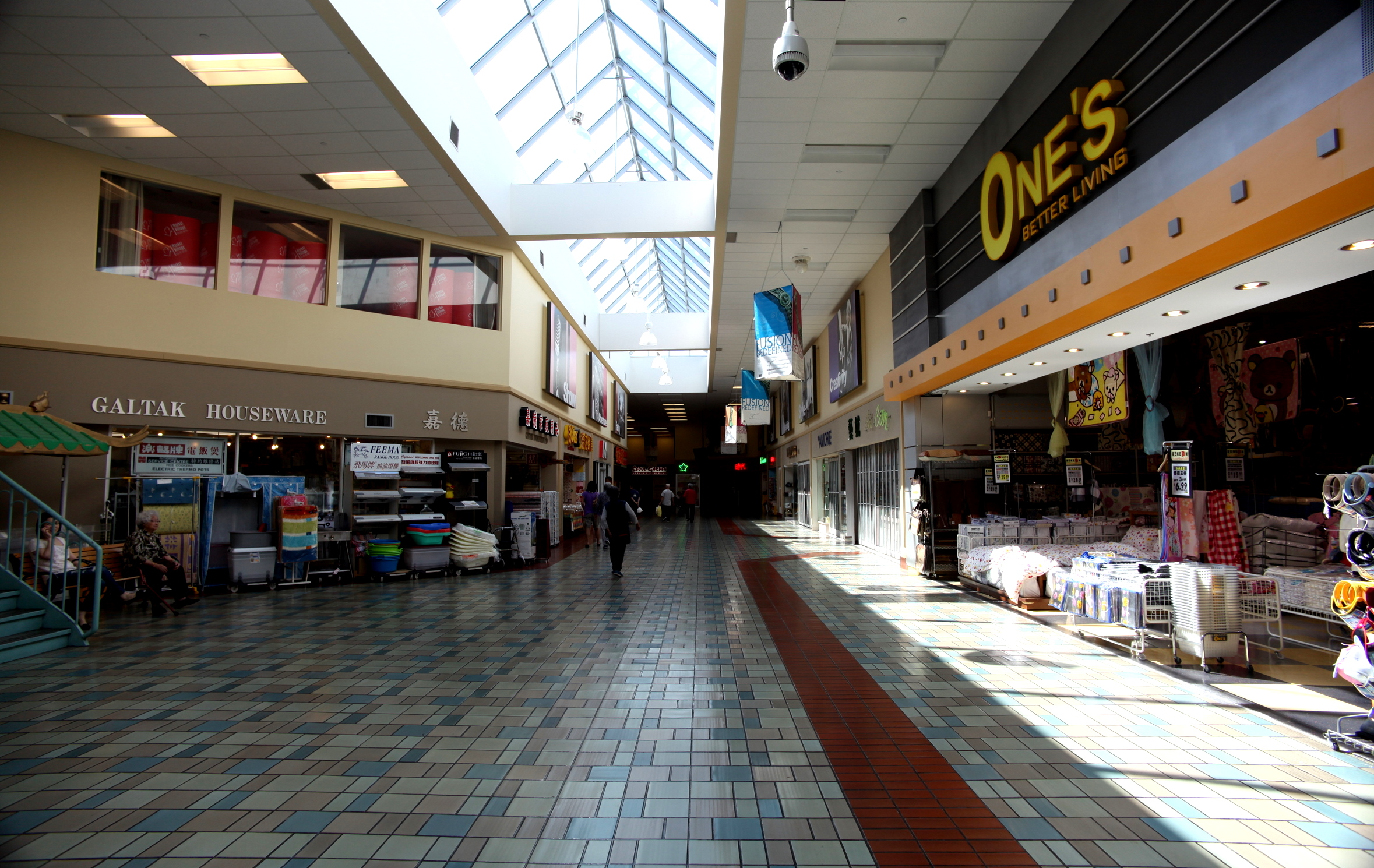
Facing south along the west corridor

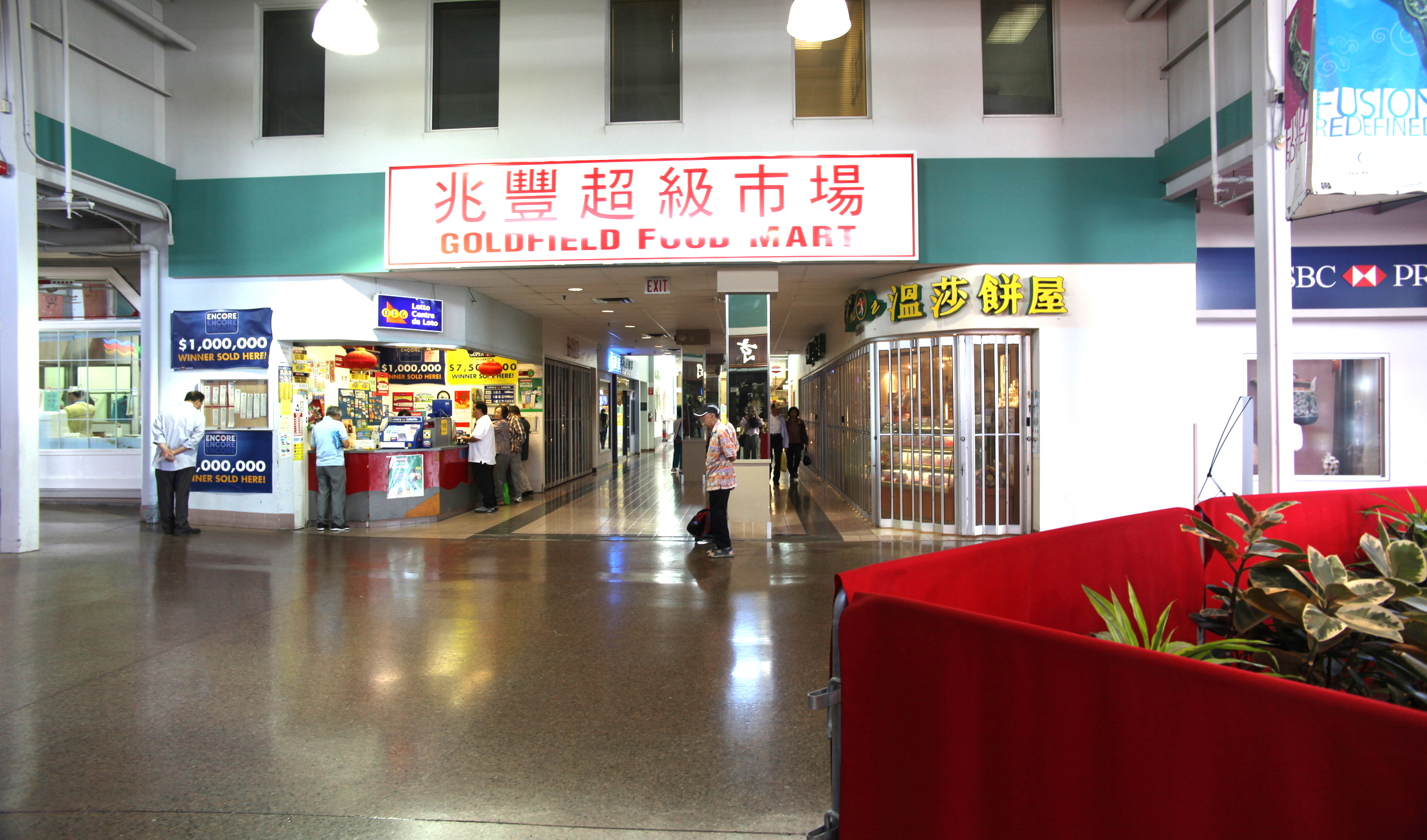
The supermarket corridor

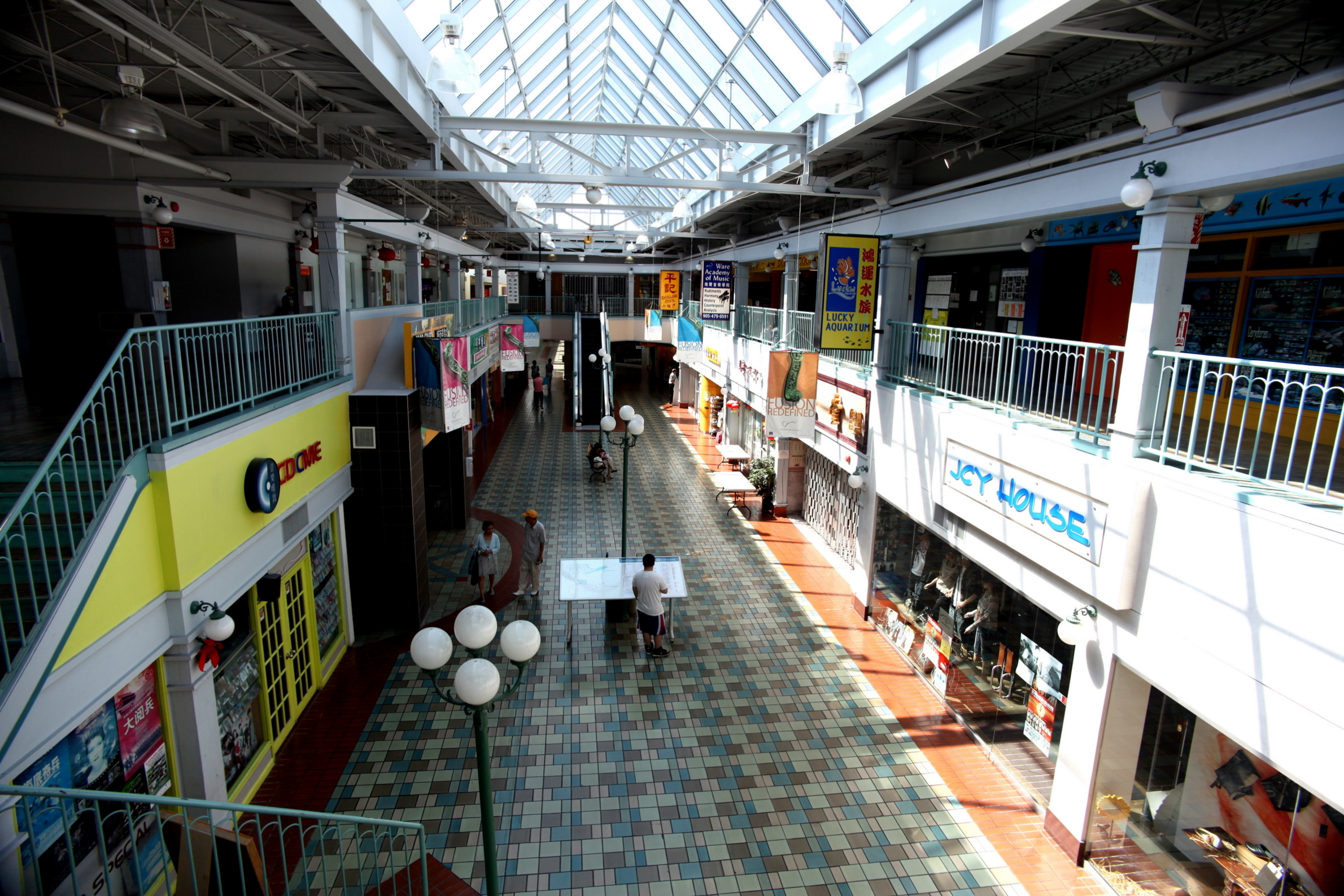
View of the first floor from the second floor

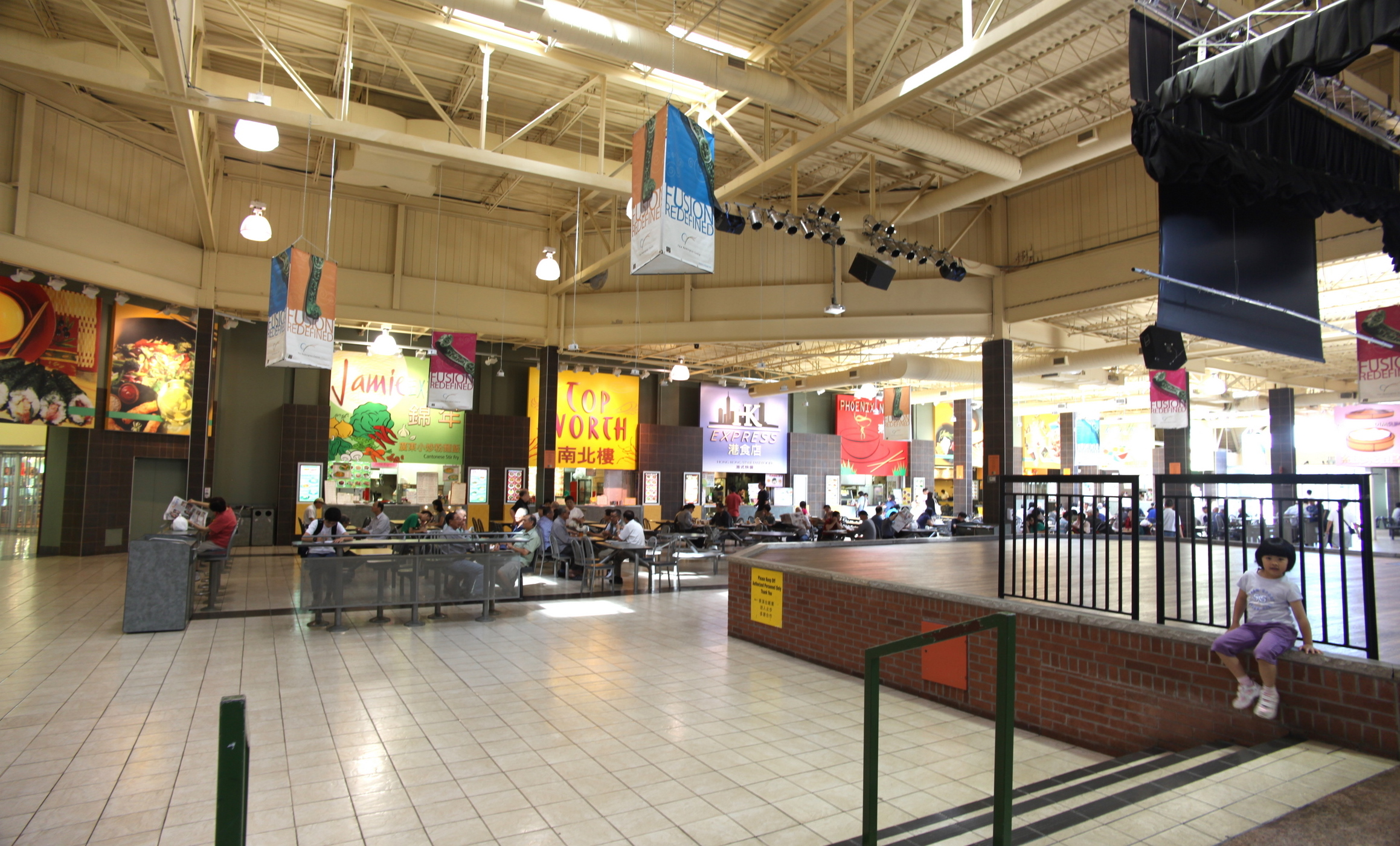
The centre stage and the food court
