= Queen Street (Brampton) =

Street in Brampton in Ontario, Canada

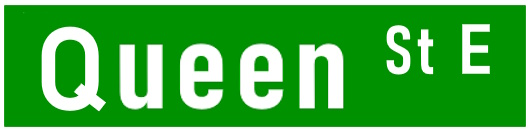
- Peel Regional Road 6 (western part); Peel Regional Road 107 (eastern part)
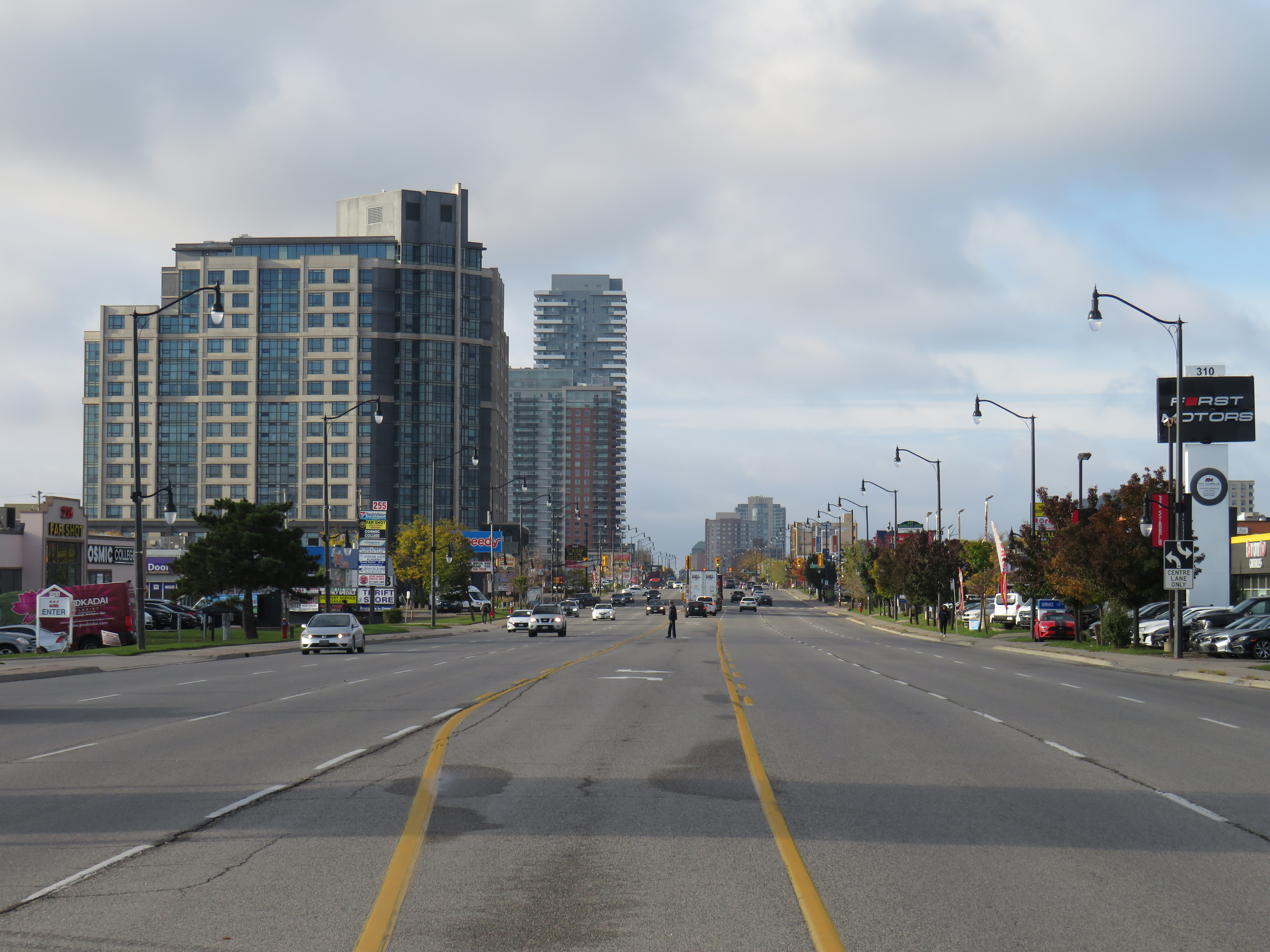
- Queen Street west of Highway 410

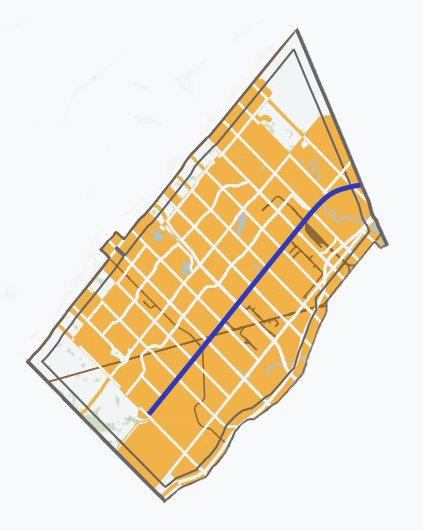
- Route of Queen Street through Brampton (blue line)
- Maintained by: Region of Peel; City of Brampton
- Location: Brampton
- West end: Mississauga Road
- Major junctions: James Potter Road; Chinguacousy Road; McLaughlin Road; Main Street; Kennedy Road; Highway 410; Dixie Road; Bramalea Road; Torbram Road; Airport Road; Goreway Drive; McVean Drive; The Gore Road
- East end: Highway 50 (continues as Highway 7 into Vaughan)
Nearby arterial roads
← Steeles Avenue	Williams Parkway; Cottrelle Boulevard →

Queen Street is the central east–west thoroughfare of the City of Brampton in Peel Region, Ontario, Canada. It follows sections of two Peel Regional Roads: 6 and 107. Queen Street continues east into the City of Vaughan as York Regional Road 7, formerly Highway 7, of which the eastern section of Queen was also part. The street is divided into east–west segments by Main Street.

== Route description ==
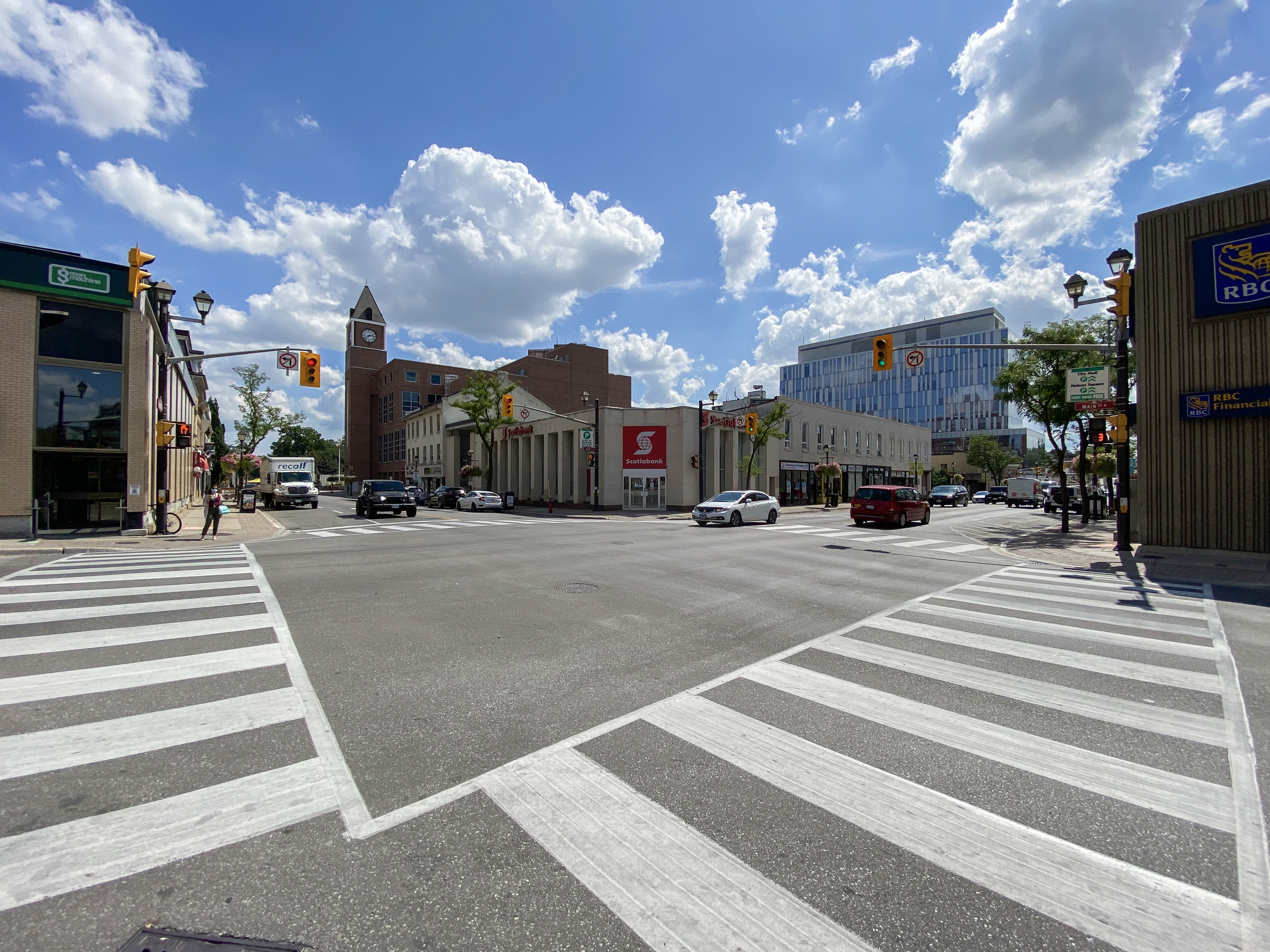
The corner of Queen and Main Streets in downtown Brampton

In the west, Queen Street begins at Mississauga Road as Peel Road 6, mostly lined with older semi-rural homes and properties through the neighbourhoods of Huttonville and Springbrook (both formerly rural hamlets) to east of Creditview Road. It becomes more developed as it passes underneath a narrow hydro corridor, then intersects Chinguacousy and Mclaughlin Roads. East of McLaughlin, its character changes abruptly as it enters an older part of Brampton. At McMurchy Avenue, the Peel Road 6 designation ends and the street is maintained by the City of Brampton east of that point. Queen then soon reaches the city's small downtown. The Algoma University at Brampton campus, a wing of Brampton City Hall, and the Rose (a performing arts venue) are located in the downtown area on Queen near Main Street.

East of downtown, starting near Kennedy Road, Queen Street widens to six lanes and becomes a busy suburban retail strip, lined with fast food outlets, car dealerships, and plazas. When it crosses Highway 410, which marks the point where former Highway 7 joined Queen Street (after running concurrently south along the 410) to follow it eastwards, Peel Region jurisdiction resumes and the street becomes Peel Road 107. East of the 410, Queen has an unusually wide right-of way with mostly median street lighting as it enters the Bramalea district. Crossing Dixie Road, it passes by the Bramalea City Centre, a large regional shopping mall, and 10 Peel Centre Drive, the headquarters of the Peel Region government. East of Torbram Road, Queen enters an industrial area, and passes over the north end of Canadian National Railways's Brampton Intermodal Terminal. Continuing eastwards, urban development breaks as it then traverses the Claireville Conservation Area, a large environmentally protected area serving as parkland. Development resumes beyond the conservation area as Queen curves to the right and enters the Ebenezer neighbourhood, which consists of mixed commercial, industrial, and residential uses. Queen Street ends at the Brampton city limits at Peel Road 50 (formerly Highway 50, but still using "Highway 50" as a name) by continuing east as York Regional Road 7, which is the continuation of former Highway 7 across York Region.

== History ==
Queen Street was originally surveyed as the Fifth Sideroad, a concession road road whose baseline also includes Embleton Road in the west and Ebenezer Road in the east. Due to the Credit River running under the concession near its intersection with Mississauga Road, a jog was created, resulting in the western terminus of Queen being at Mississauga Road, with Embleton running along the section west of the jog. In the east, a part of the concession was bypassed to eliminate a jog in the former Highway 7 at Highway 50 at the former Peel / York county (now region) line.

East of Highway 410, Queen was part of Highway 7, until the portion of the highway through Brampton was downloaded to Peel Region in 1997. The number 107 was chosen over 7 due to Airport Road already being Peel Road 7. To keep the former highway route (which ran concurrently with Highway 410 north to before continuing west along what is today Bovaird Drive) easy to follow for motorists, the 107 designation was applied to Queen east of the 410, and to Bovaird west of it, with "Formerly Highway 7" tabs placed under the regional road shields. Later, the Peel Road 6 designation was given to Queen west of McMurchy Ave. west of downtown (not at the 410), hence the street's signing as two regional roads.

Prior to the construction of Highway 410, Highway 7 followed Queen as far west as Main Street to run concurrently with Highway 10 north to Bovaird Drive.

== Public transit ==
There are three Brampton Transit trunk routes serving Queen Street; one a local bus route and two bus rapid transit (BRT) routes. The Route #1 Queen serves its entire length from Brampton's eastern limits to the streets western end at Mississauga Road, where it turns north, before briefly running east on Bovaird Drive to terminate at Mount Pleasant GO station, and there is also a limited-service 'A' branch serving a shorter section (roughly between Chinguacousy and Airport Roads) and looping via side streets.

The BRT routes, branded Züm, split service along both halves of Queen; divided at the Brampton Downtown Terminal. The 501 Züm Queen runs along the eastern half, stopping at the Bramalea Terminal, before continuing into the City of Vaughan along Highway 7, where it makes a connection with the Toronto subway system at the SmartVMC Bus Terminal (next to Vaughan Metropolitan Centre station), where the route terminates.

561 Züm Queen West serves the western portion of Queen until Mississauga Road, where it turns north (as does Route #1) to reach Mount Pleasant GO station.

Route table:

Route			Direction and Termini		
1	Queen	EB	To Highway 50 via Mississauga Road, Brampton Downtown Terminal, and Bramalea Terminal	WB	To Mount Pleasant GO Station via Bramalea and Brampton Downtown Terminals, and Mississauga Road
1A	Queen	EB	To Coventry Road via Brampton Downtown and Bramalea Terminals (weekday service only)	WB	To Major William Sharpe Drive via Bramalea and Brampton Downtown Terminals (weekday service only)
501	Züm Queen	EB	To SmartVMC Bus Terminal (VMC station) via Bramalea Terminal and Highway 7	WB	To Brampton Downtown Terminal via Highway 7 and Bramalea Terminal
561	Züm Queen; West	EB	To Brampton Downtown Terminal via Mississauga Road	WB	To Mount Pleasant GO Station via Mississauga Road

== Future bus rapid-way ==
The proposed Queen Street–Highway 7 BRT corridor is "poised to be a game-changer for Brampton and Vaughan". This project aims to address the city's growing transportation challenges while stimulating economic growth and enhancing quality of life. Key benefits of a BRT on Queen Street include:

- Reduced traffic congestion: By providing a dedicated lane for buses, BRT can significantly improve travel times and reduce traffic congestion on Queen Street.
- Increased ridership: BRT's speed, reliability, and comfort can attract more people to choose public transit over personal vehicles.
- Economic development: BRT stations can serve as catalysts for development, attracting new businesses and investment to the area.
- Environmental sustainability: By reducing reliance on personal vehicles, BRT can help to improve air quality and reduce greenhouse gas emissions.
- Improved accessibility: BRT can provide better access to jobs, education, healthcare, and other essential services for residents.

Next Steps To move forward with the Queen Street BRT, several key steps need to be taken:

- Detailed planning and design: Developing a comprehensive plan for the BRT system, including station locations, route alignment, and operating schedules.
- Environmental impact assessment: Conducting a thorough assessment to identify potential environmental impacts and mitigation measures.
- Public consultation: Engaging with the community to gather feedback and address concerns.
- Funding acquisition: Securing the necessary financial resources to implement the project.
- Construction and implementation: Building the BRT infrastructure and launching the service.

== Communities along the route ==
- Huttonville
- Springbrook
- Downtown Brampton
- Bramalea
- Claireville
- Ebenezer

== Landmarks along the route ==
- Brampton City Hall complex
- Rose Theatre Brampton (the Rose)
- Bramalea City Centre
- Brampton Intermodal Terminal
- Claireville Conservation Area

== See also ==
- List of roads in Brampton
- List of numbered roads in Peel Region
- Ontario Highway 7
