= Clairville =

Clairville may refer to:

== Locations ==
=== America ===
- An alternate name for Davisville, West Virginia

=== Canada ===
==== Ontario ====
- Clairville, Toronto, a former village and neighbourhood in Toronto
- Claireville, Brampton, the portion of the village in Brampton
  - Claireville Conservation Area, in Brampton

==== Elsewhere ====
- Clairville, an unincorporated community in Weldford Parish, New Brunswick, Canada

== People ==
- Clairville (Louis-François Nicolaïe) (1811–1879), the pseudonym of the French author Louis-François Nicolaïe
- Joseph Philippe de Clairville (1742–1830), Swiss botanist
