= Castlemore, Brampton =

Castlemore
- Neighbourhood
- Interactive map of Castlemore
- Coordinates: 43°47′27.42″N 79°41′22.92″W
- Country: Canada
- Province: Ontario
- Regional Municipality: Peel
- City: Brampton
- Forward sortation area: L6P
- NTS Map: 030M13
- GNBC Code: FDJWC

Castlemore is suburban area that is located 14 km northeast of downtown Brampton in Ontario, Canada. It consists of multiple neighbourhoods of Brampton northwest of Claireville.

The area has been in active development since the early 1990s, with residential developments built in the southeastern portion in the 2000s. It has a number of luxury homes with 2-acre (8,100 m^{2}) lots.

Castlemore is southwest of Bolton, southeast of Caledon and Orangeville, and west of Vaughan. It is accessible from Highway 427 via Highway 7, and The Gore and the Highway 407 at the Goreway interchange or at Airport Road interchange.

Religion in L6P (2021)
1. Sikh (39.2%)
2. Hindu (25.5%)
3. Christian (21.9%)
4. Muslim (7.60%)
5. Buddhist (0.70%)
6. Other (0.50%)
7. Irreligious (4.60%)

The West Humber River flows through the western portion of Castlemore.

== Geography ==
Farmlands formerly surrounded the centre of Castlemore, whereas forests are the dominant feature in the Etobicoke Creek and the West Humber River valleys, which include the outlying hills and a conservation area to the south. To the north is more farmland.

== History ==
The larger lots were developed in the 1970s and expanded in the northern portion of Castlemore in the 1980s. Large lots continued to be developed until the 2000s. In 1996, Castlemore was connected with Rutherford, the construction took several months between March and June, in 1997, a road linking Bolton and Highway 7 (then Highway 50) expanded. In 2001, the southwestern portion near Springdale expanded and south of Castlemore since 2002 continues with smaller lots. Expansions is still underway with multiple new luxury properties such as the vales of humber estates, along with existing luxury communities such as the Vales Of Castlemore.

A portion of the luxury homes are around Alloa. A small industrial building is at Cadetta and in the 2000s added Sears east of Castlemore. In 2004, the Chateaus began between Mayfield and Countryside and Goreway. The luxury homes are between Airport and Goreway and the Gore and Castlemore Road and Mayfield.
