= Downtown Brampton =

City centre in Brampton, Ontario

- City centre
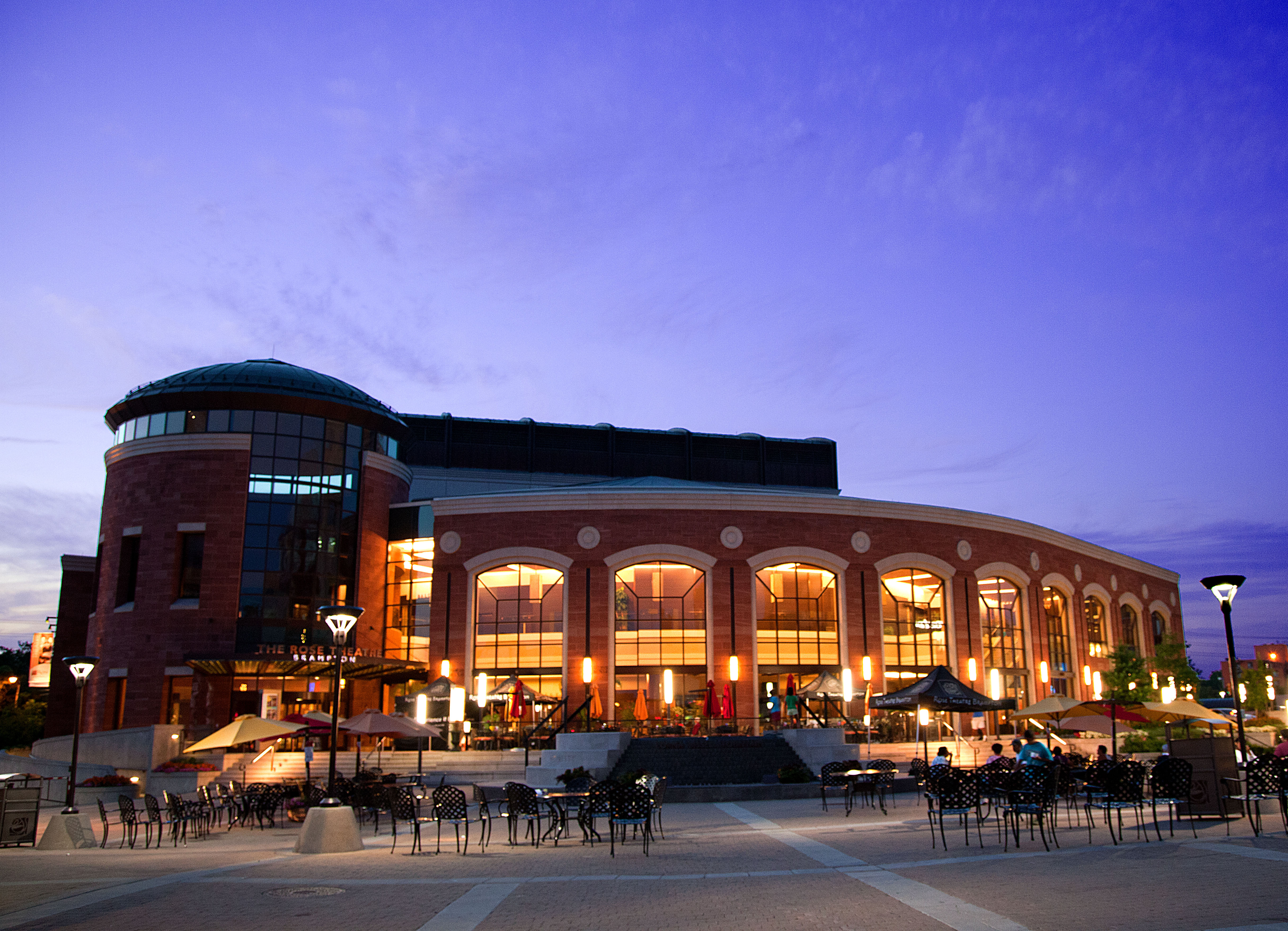
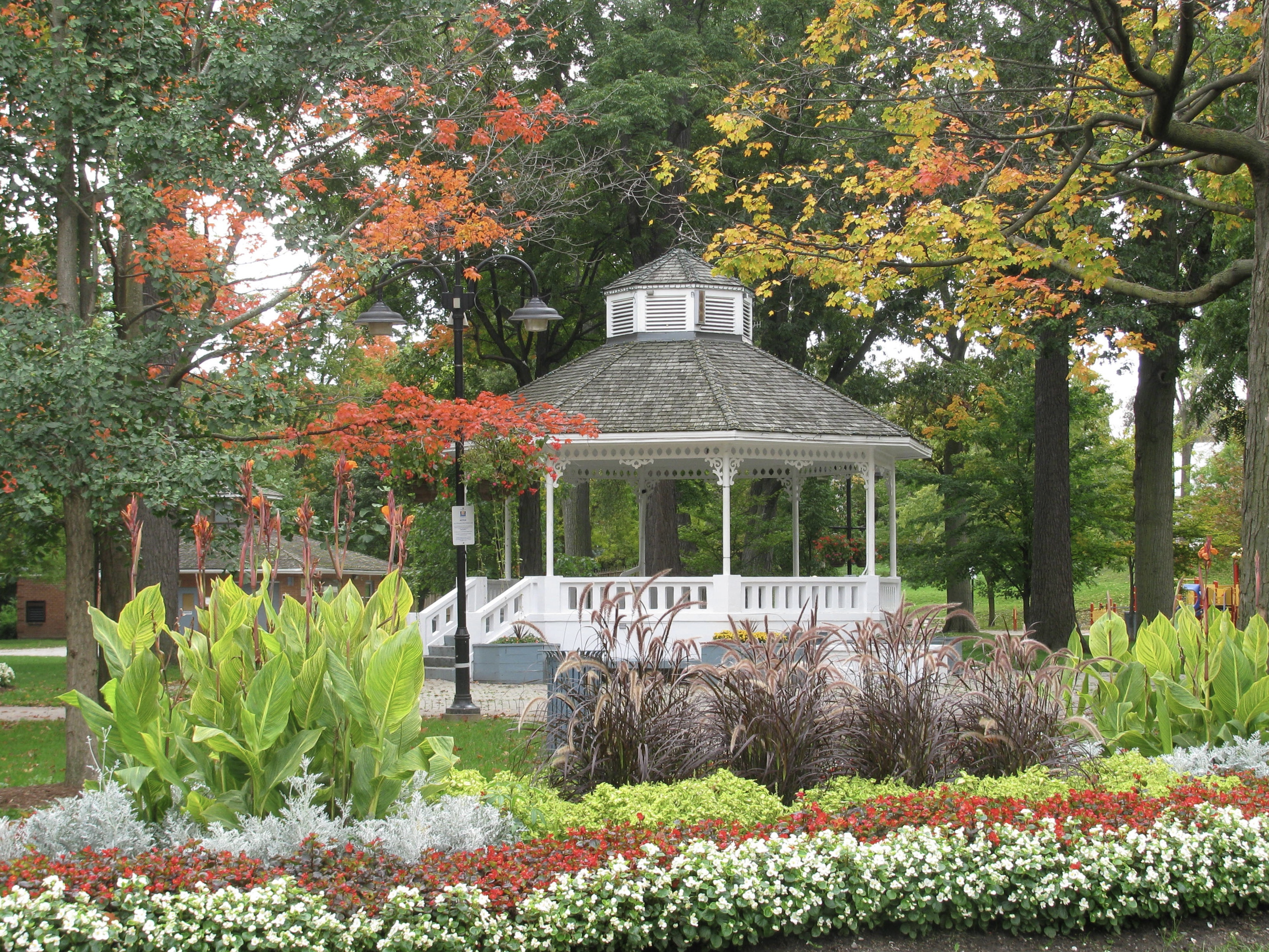
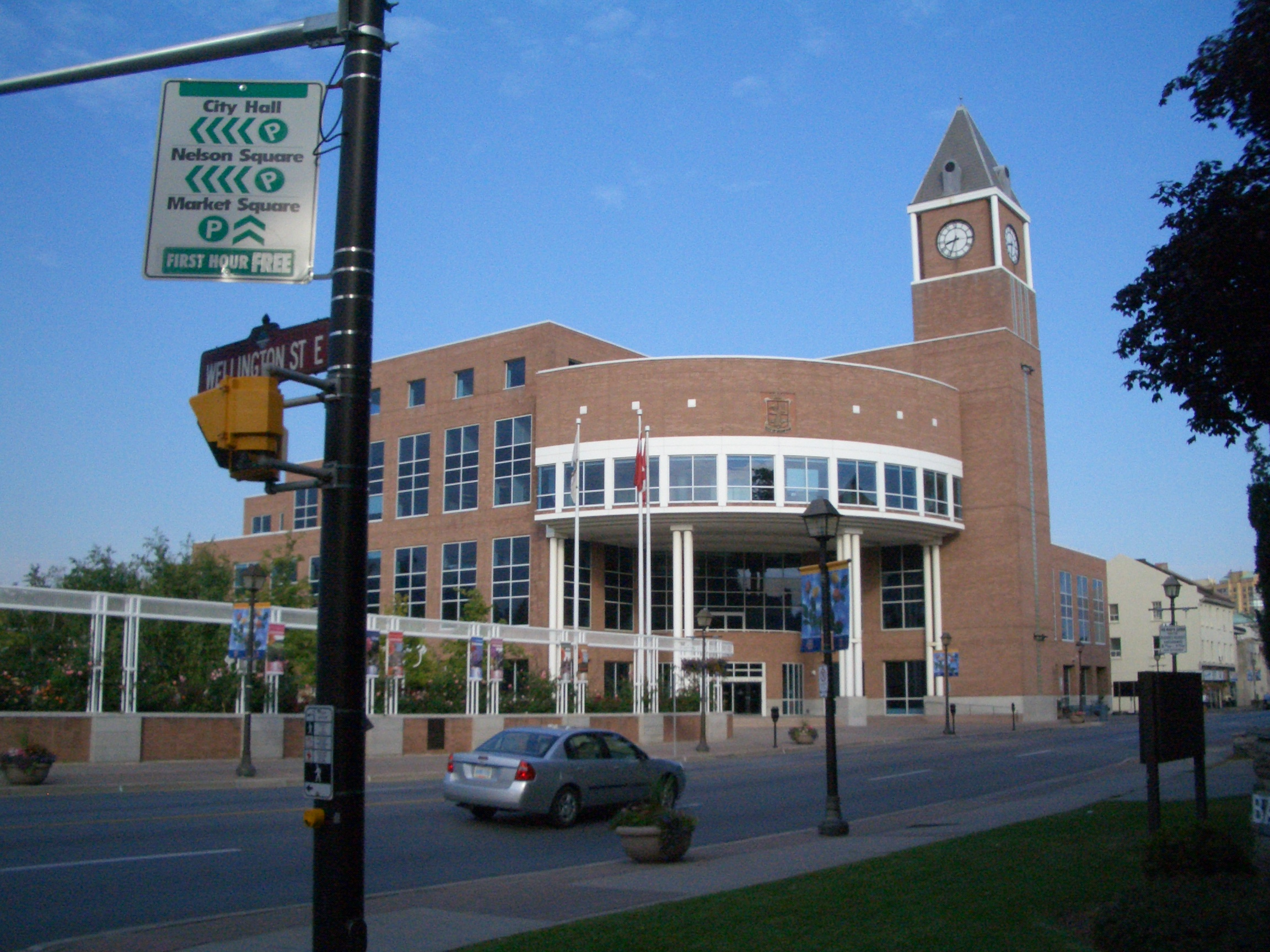
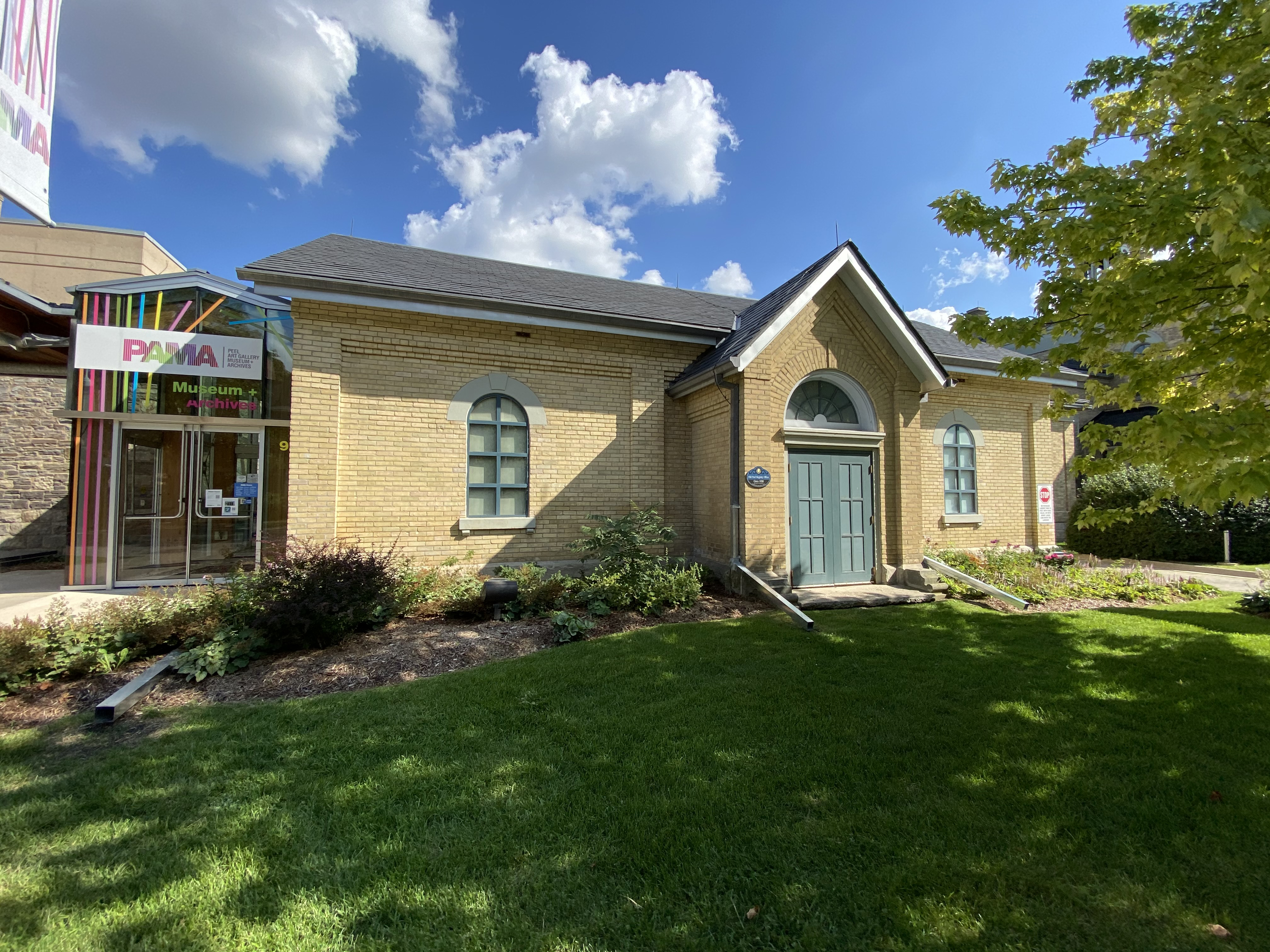
- Counter-clockwise, from top: Rose Theater, Brampton City Hall, Peel Art Gallery, and Gage Park
- Nickname(s): "DTB", "Four Corners"
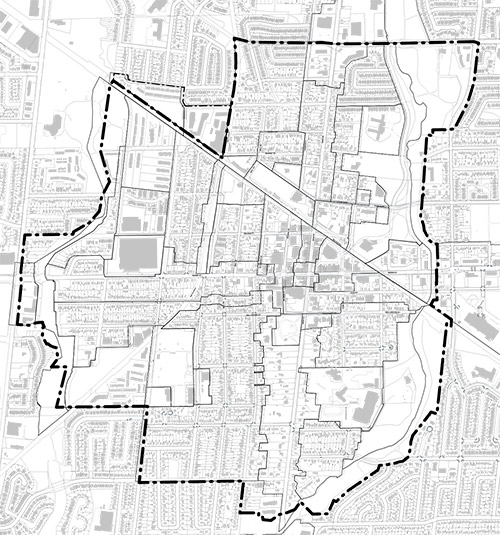
- Map showing Downtown Brampton.
- Interactive map of Downtown Brampton
- Country: Canada
- Province: Ontario
- Downtown: Brampton

Area
  - Total: 2.5 km^{2} (0.97 sq mi)

Population (2022)
  - Total: 31,829
  - Estimate (2024): 36,700
  - Density: 4,109/km^{2} (10,640/sq mi)
- Postal codes: L6P to L7A

Downtown Brampton (commonly abbreviated as DTB), also known as the Four Corners, is the historic city centre of Brampton, Ontario, Canada. Downtown is located in the southwest part of the city near the intersection of the Queen and Main Streets. In 2017, the provincial funding was recorded at around Canadian CA$3.3 million.

Shortly after taking office, Patrick Brown scrapped the Downtown Reimagined initiative—a major revitalization project designed to modernize the core. As a result of the cancellation, urgent infrastructure work that was needed, was delayed and disrupted downtown.

== History ==
=== 20th Century ===
In 1922, the Capitol Theatre (later known as the Heritage Theatre) was built in downtown Brampton. The theatre's schedule had consisted of primarily of vaudeville and silent movies. Later, in the early 1990s, a new city hall was constructed by Inzola Construction and designed by Robert J. Posliff Architect. During the development of the "new town" of Bramalea (originally within Chinguacousy Township before being amalgamated with Brampton in 1974) beginning in the 1970s, the community began working on an extensive Master Plan, including provisions for a parkland trail system and a "downtown," which included essential services and a shopping centre. The centrepiece of downtown was the Civic Centre, which included the city hall and library.

=== 21st Century ===
==== Integrated Downtown Plan and cancellation ====
The city incorporated the Integrated Downtown Plan (IDP), a guiding growth and investment strategy spanning 30 years until 2051. This focuses on increasing education, employment, services for the neighborhood, while improving streetscapes and public areas to create an entrepreneurial environment.

After being elected in 2018, mayor Patrick Brown scrapped the Downtown Reimagined initiative—a major revitalization project designed to "modernize" the neighbourhood. As a result of the cancellation, urgent infrastructure work that was needed, delayed improvements and caused disruptions in the area. In February 2026, the City of Brampton requested approval for commencement of the Riverwalk project.

== Demographics ==
The area has a population density of 4,109 people per square kilometre. As of 2022, Downtown Brampton had a population of around 32,000 residents.

== Landmarks ==
Downtown Brampton is home to multiple public parks, plazas, gardens and other open space:

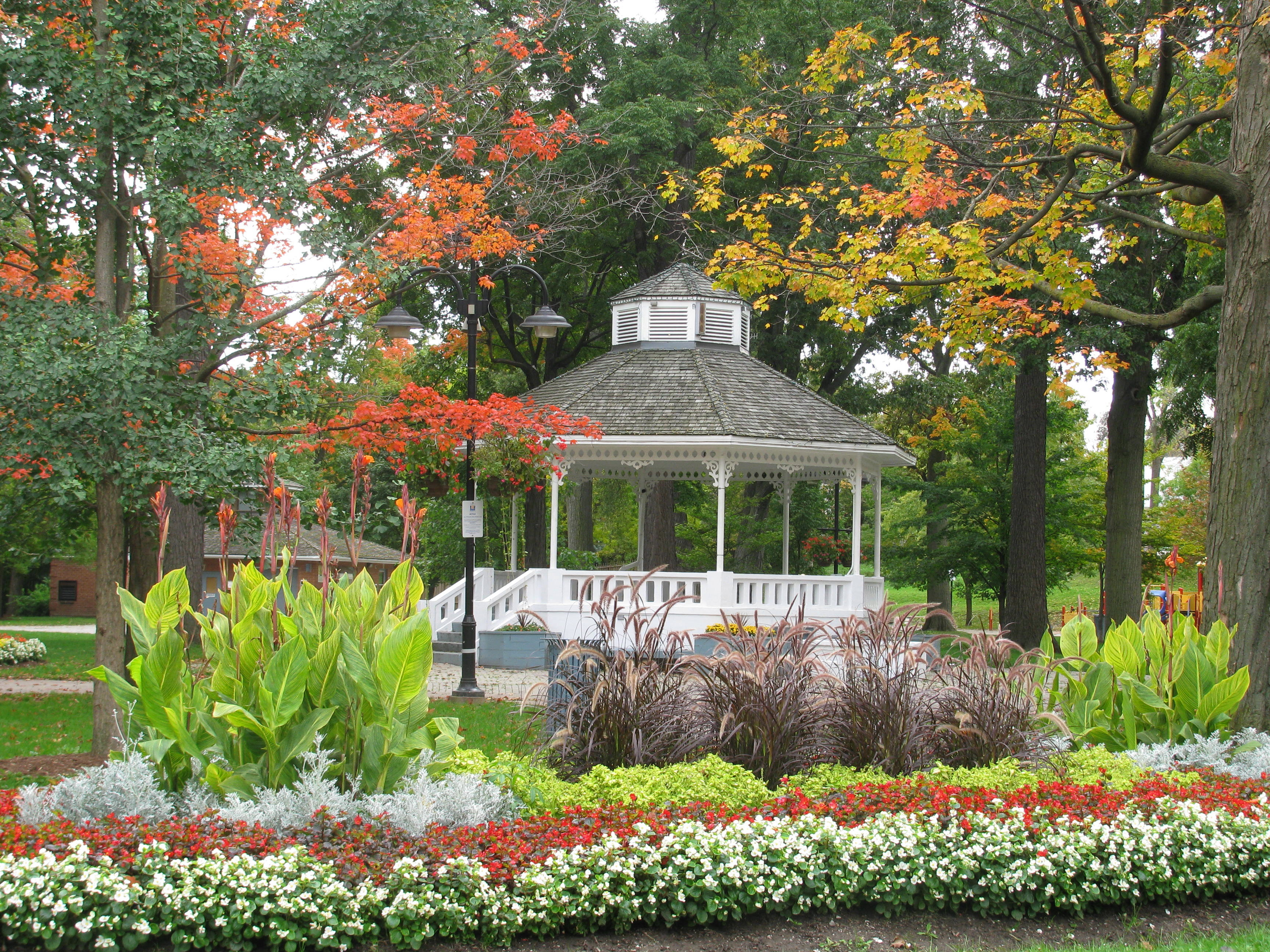
Gage Park as seen in October 2009

- Gage Park
- Peel Art Gallery
- Brampton City Hall
- Rose Theatre
