= Ebenezer, Ontario =

Ebenezer, Ontario can refer to the following places:

- Ebenezer, Brampton
- Ebenezer, Hastings County, Ontario
- Ebenezer, Leeds and Grenville County, Ontario
- Ebenezer, Simcoe County, Ontario
