= Donald M. Gordon Chinguacousy Park =

Park in Brampton, Ontario, Canada

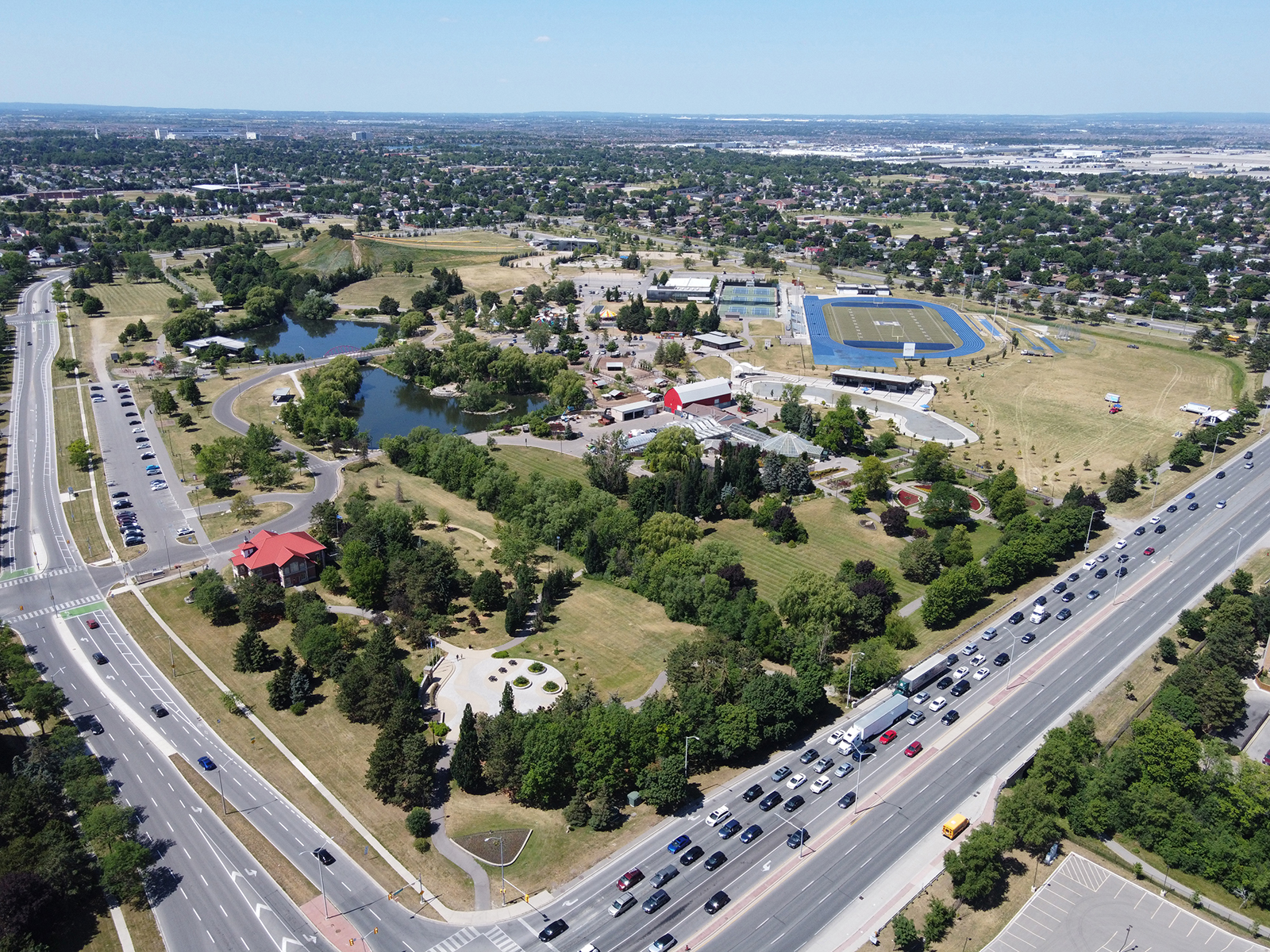
- Aerial view facing north of Chinguacousy Park with Terry Fox Stadium at the upper right and busy Queen Street East on the lower right, 2022
- Interactive map of Donald M. Gordon Chinguacousy Park
- Location: 9050 Bramalea Road, Brampton, Ontario, Canada
- Coordinates: 43°43′29″N 79°43′05″W

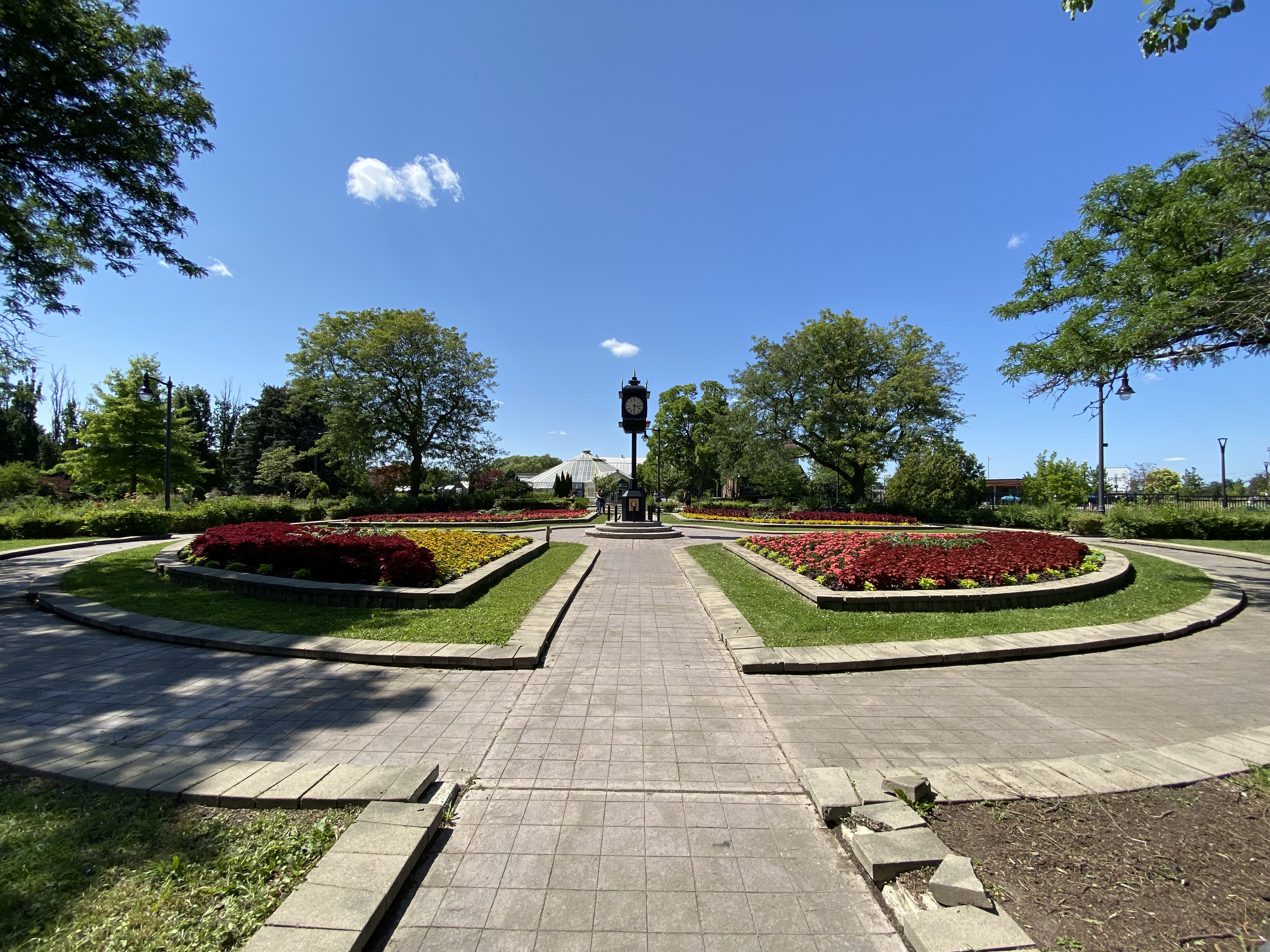
Chinguacousy Park Clock

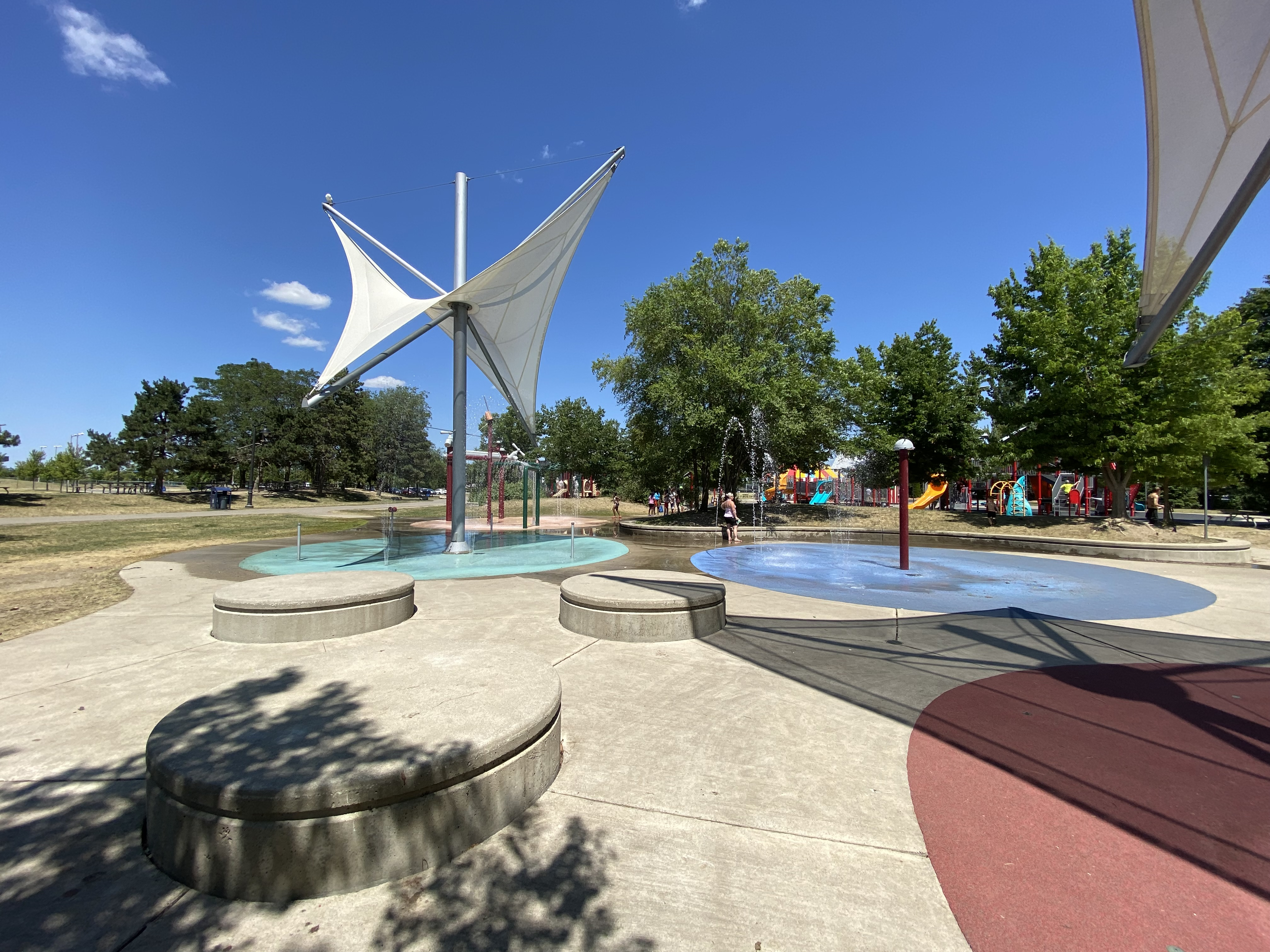
Chinguacousy Splash Pad

Donald M. Gordon Chinguacousy Park, (Note: Chinguacousy roughly translates to "Young Pine River".) colloquially known as Chinguacousy Park, is a large 40-hectare (100-acre) park in the Bramalea section of Brampton. It is bounded by Queen Street East on the southeast, Bramalea Road on the northeast, and Central Park Drive on the north and west sides. Terry Fox Stadium is located in the north of the park, also sometimes called the Terry Fox Track and Field Stadium, has a track and field oval surrounding an artificial turf field with Canadian football markings and stands for about 1000 spectators. It is used for various Canadian football and soccer matches as well as track and field competitions. The park is named after Donald M. Gordon, who helped form the parks and recreation programs in Brampton, as well as Chippewa Chief Shinguacose (d. 1858).

== History ==
In 1970, Chinguacousy Township Council bought the 40-hectare (100-acre) farm from the last owners (surveyed in 1820s by Richard Bristol and eventually acquired by the Crawfords whom expanded their holdings from 1834 to 1870s, and sold by the Crawfords in 1946 to Bramalea Ltd), with the intention of building a large park in the growing community of Bramalea, paying for land and facilities from the proceeds of subdivision agreements. The old barn and farmhouse were retained as part of the new park redevelopment. It was named Chinguacousy Park after the township the community of Bramalea was located in.

In 2014, the federal, provincial and municipal government each agreed to contribute $8.2 million towards renovations and new construction. Almost a decade later, in 2023, Brampton Library's Chinguacousy Branch was evicted from Brampton Civic Centre and moved to the Ski Chalet at Chinguacousy Park. A monument for Terry Fox would be in the works since 2023, it was completed by Toronto-based artist Christiano De Araujo.

== Facilities and activities ==
The park's sport facilities include a curling facility, winterized tennis courts, beach volleyball courts, boating, skiing and track-and-field facilities. They also offer mini-putt golf, formal gardens and greenhouse, pedal boats, pony rides, petting zoo and barn, splash pad and children's playground, and a BMX/skateboard park. In winter 2017, a 2,000-square-metre (22,000 sq ft) canal-style skating trail opened. It converts to a reflective fountain in summer.

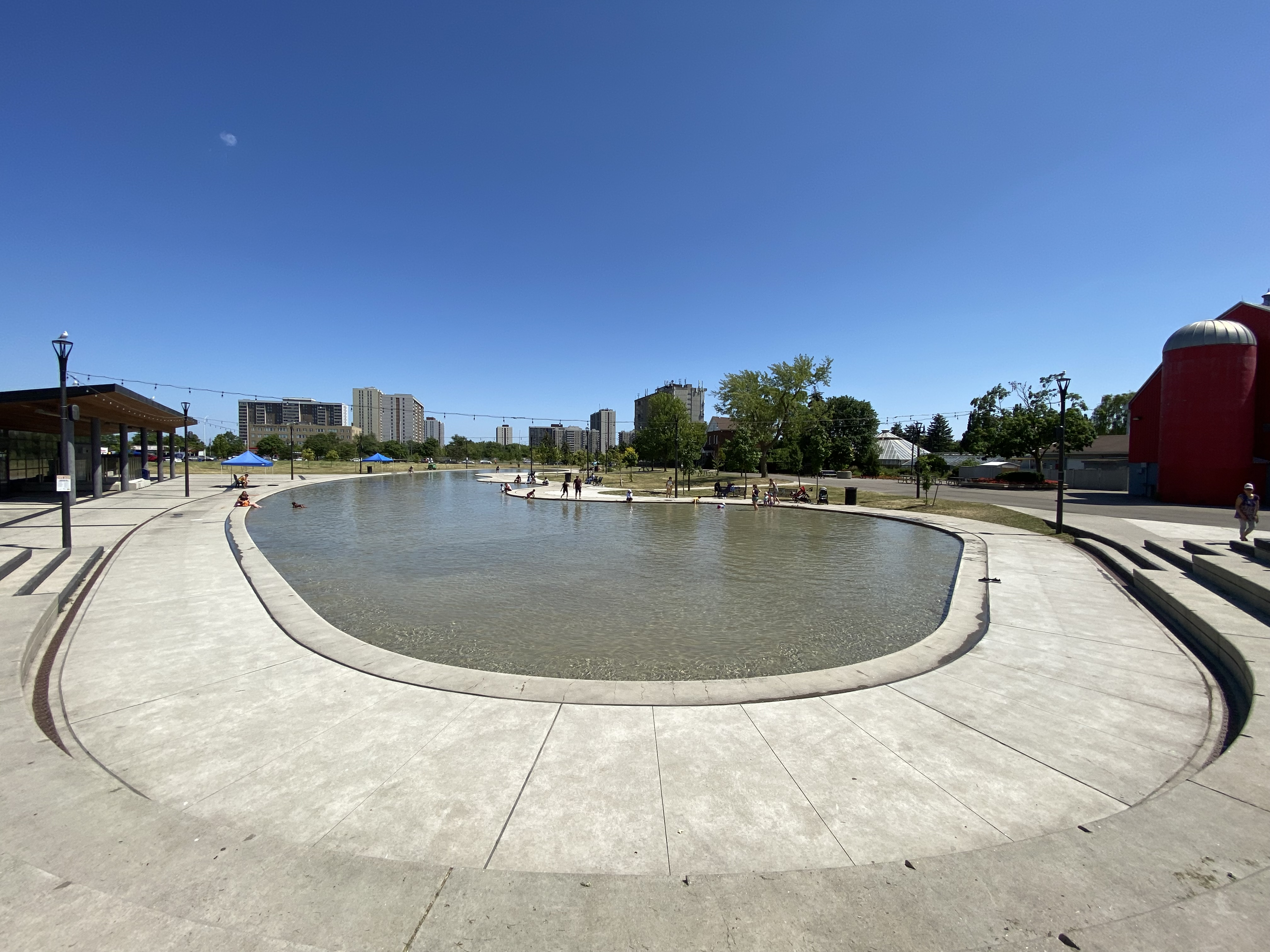
Park Skate Trail

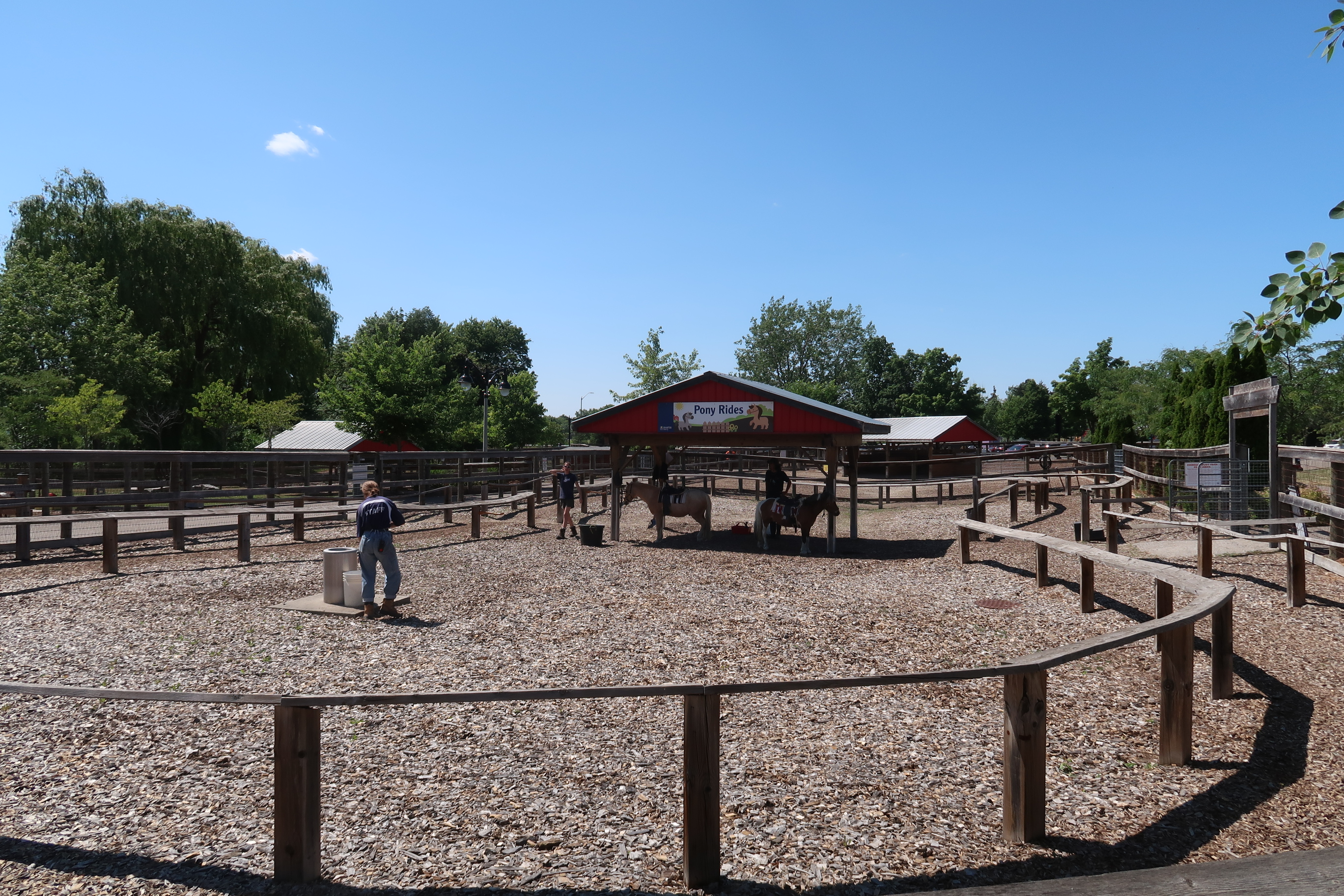
Petting Zoo

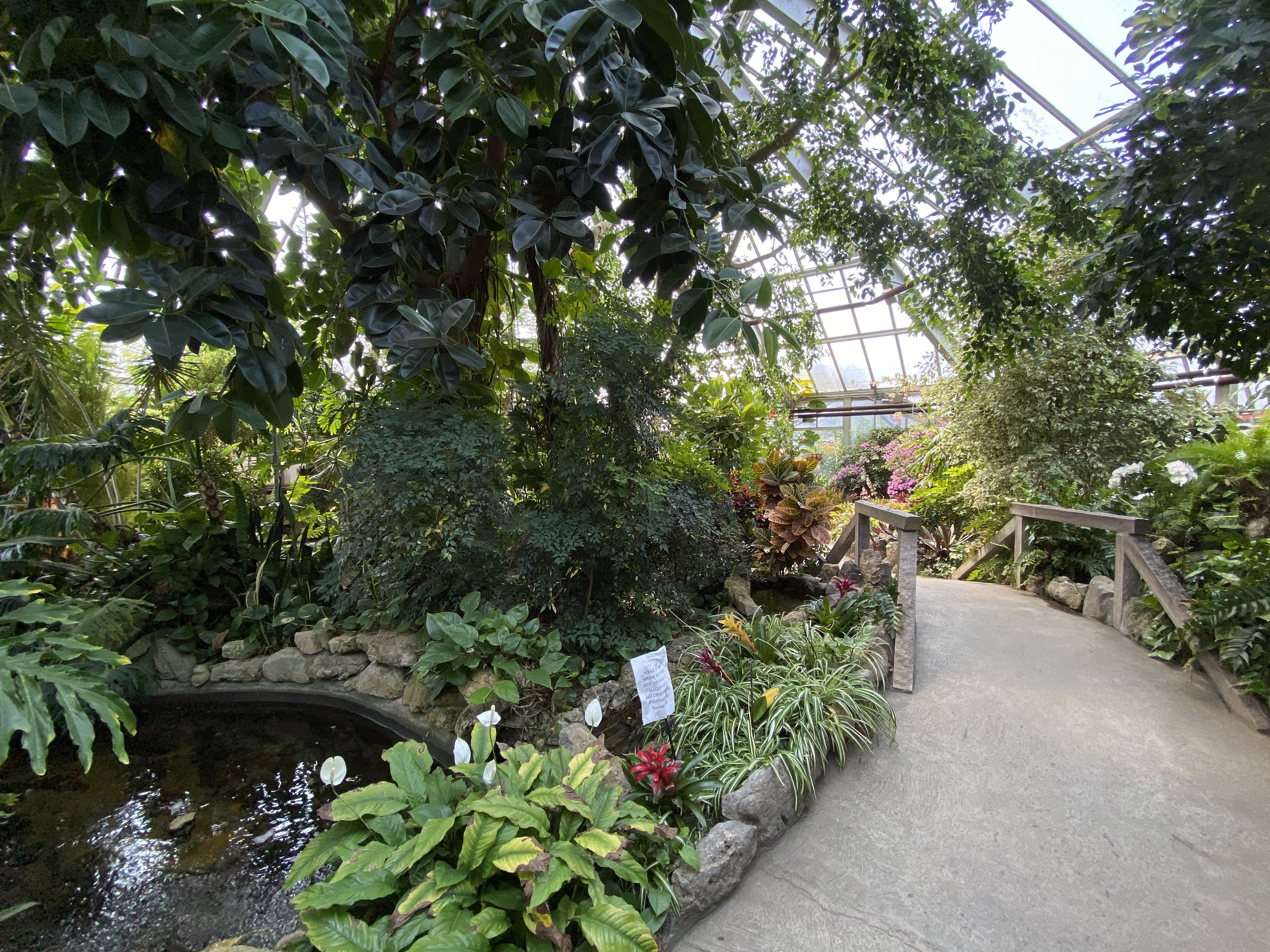
Greenhouse

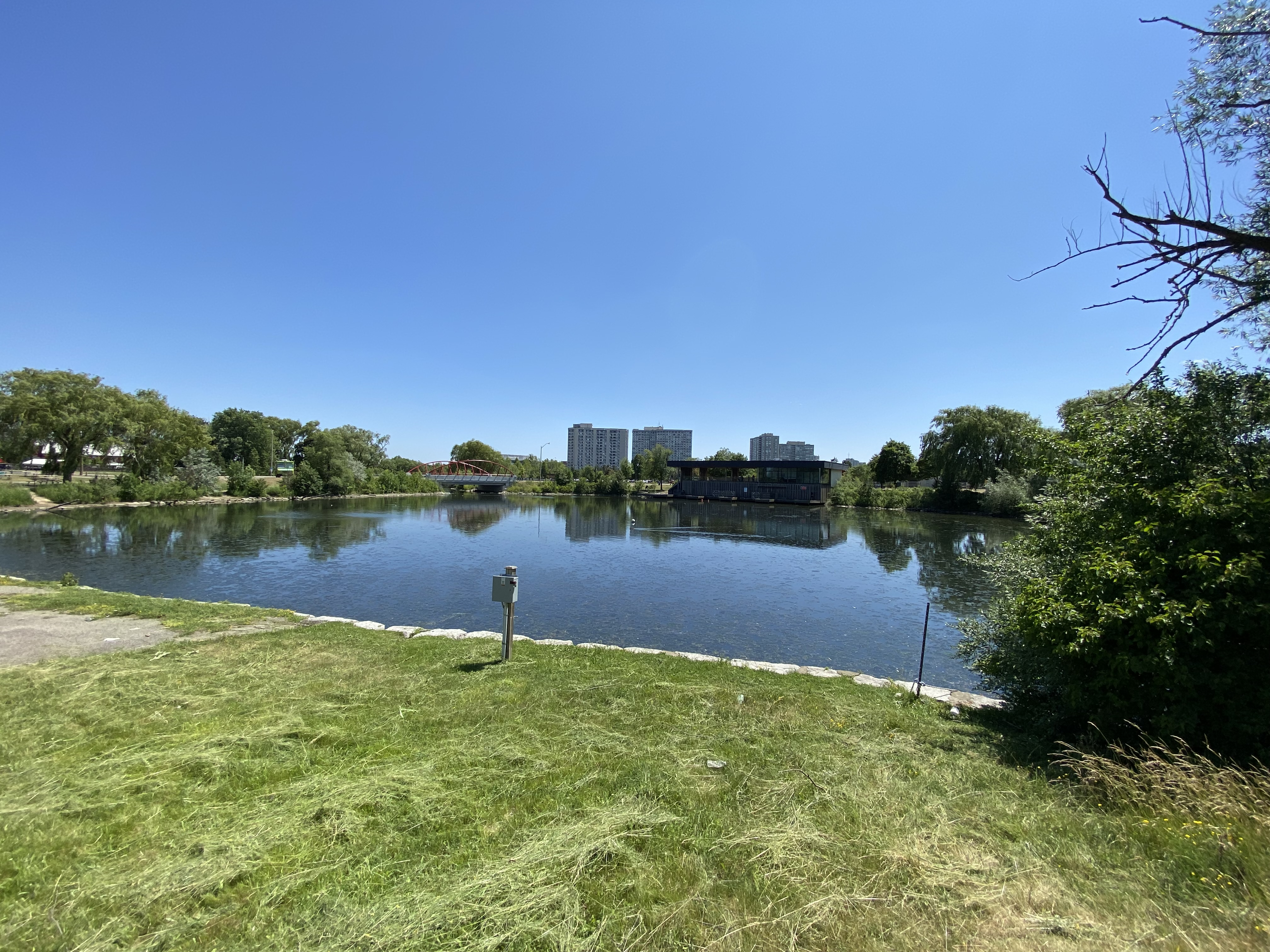
Pond

=== Mount Chinguacousy ===
Mount Chinguacousy is a small 1-hectare (2.5-acre) alpine skiing and snowboarding hill located in the park, near the intersection of Bramalea Road and Central Park Drive. It features a magic carpet ski lift, beginner slopes on either side of the lift and a chalet and rental shop at the base of the hill. It is about 21 metres (69 ft) high, with its longest run 188 m (617 ft). It has snow-making facilities and night skiing, and is the only ski hill in Brampton.

The hill is man-made, but contrary to popular belief, is not a former landfill site, but is constructed from the excavations for basements of many early Bramalea houses.

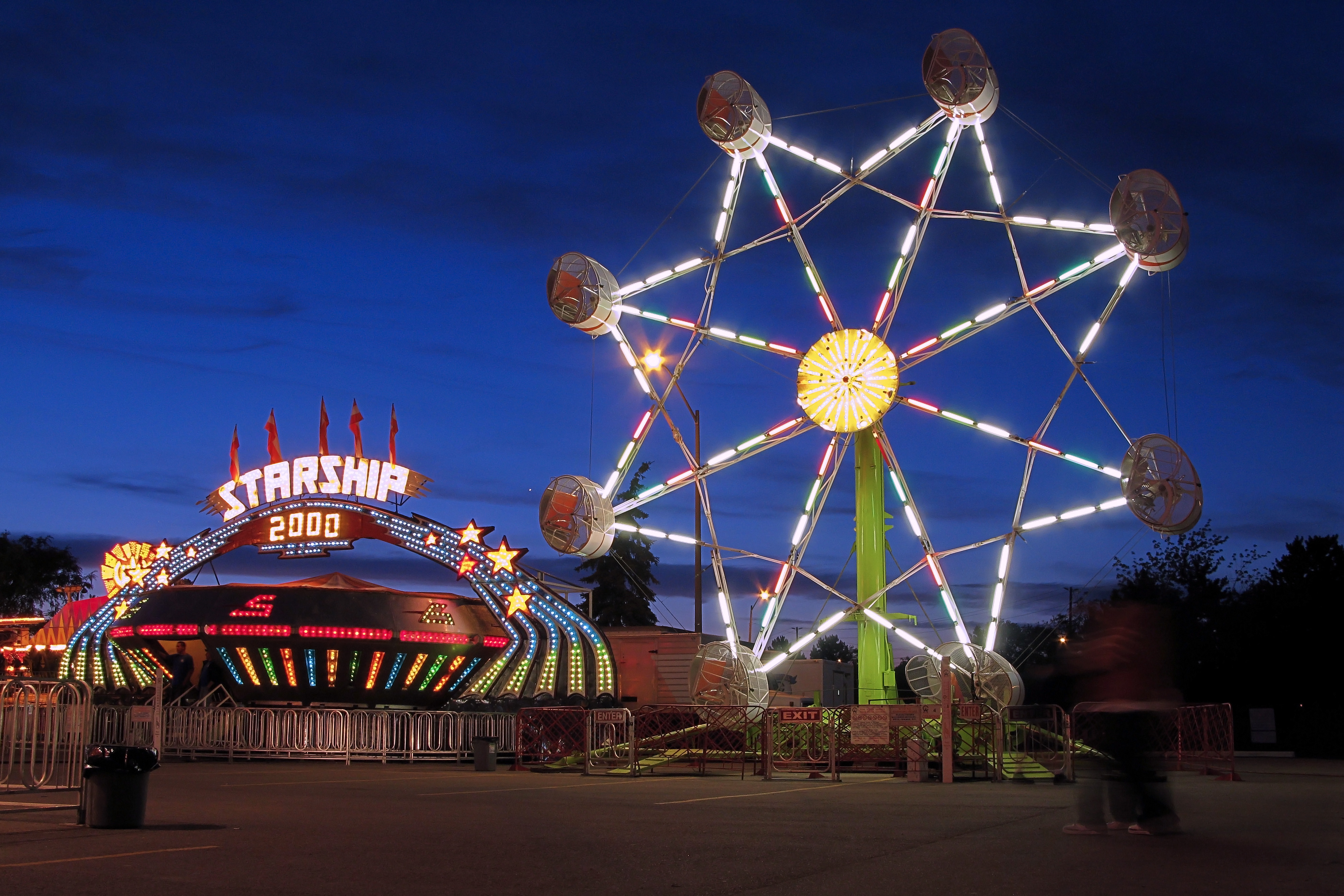
Chinguacousy Park during the Canada Day celebrations in 2008

=== Events ===
There are a variety of summer camps offered for children and teens at this park. They are offered through Brampton Parks and Recreation Department. The park is also host to annual carnivals. City of Brampton hosts a Tough Run 5-kilometre (3.1 mi) adventure race every September. The park also hosts outdoor movie nights during the summer.

== See also ==
- List of ski areas and resorts in Canada
