= Claireville, Toronto =

Claireville
- Neighbourhood; Former hamlet
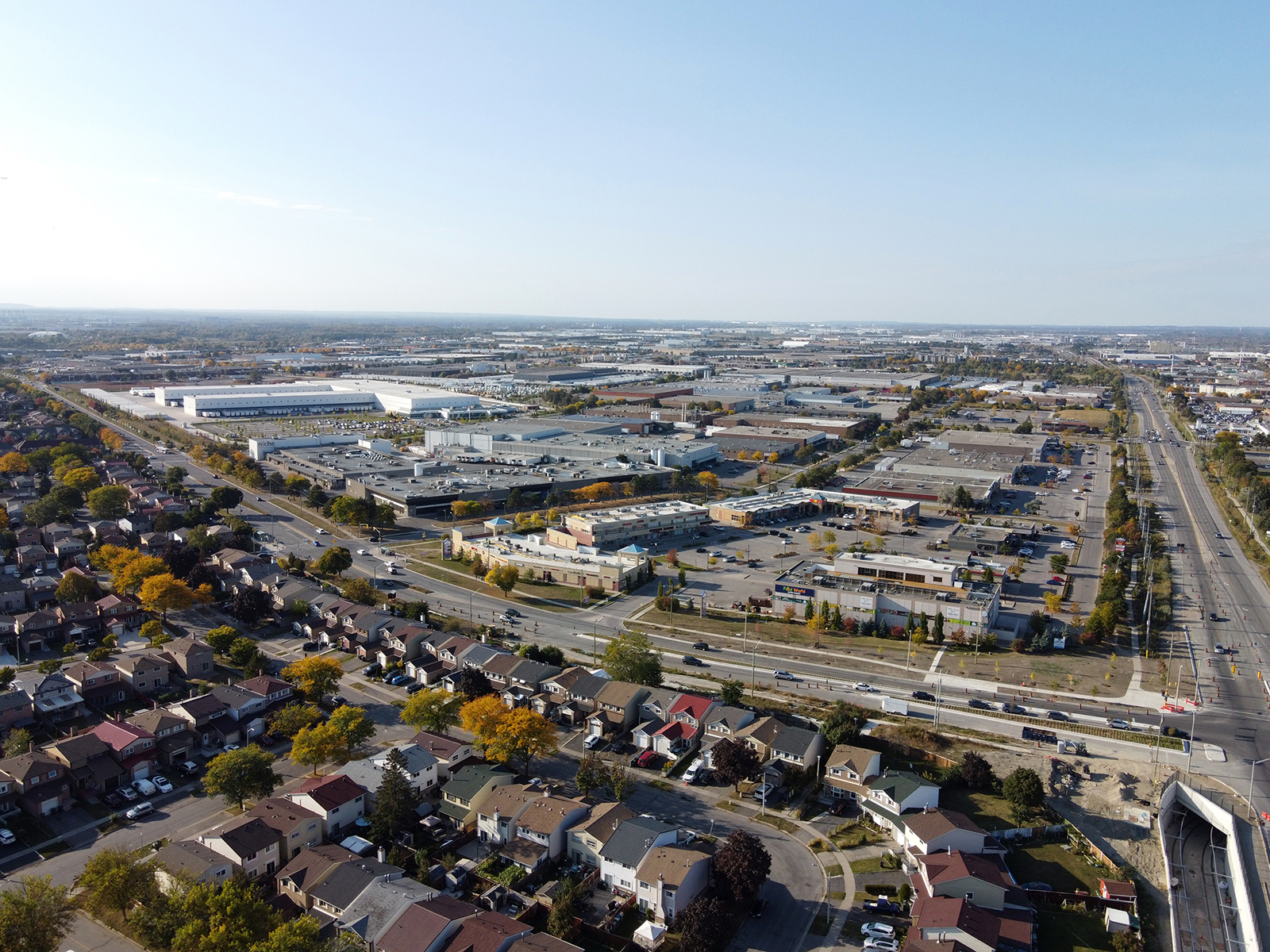
- Aerial view of Clairville in 2023

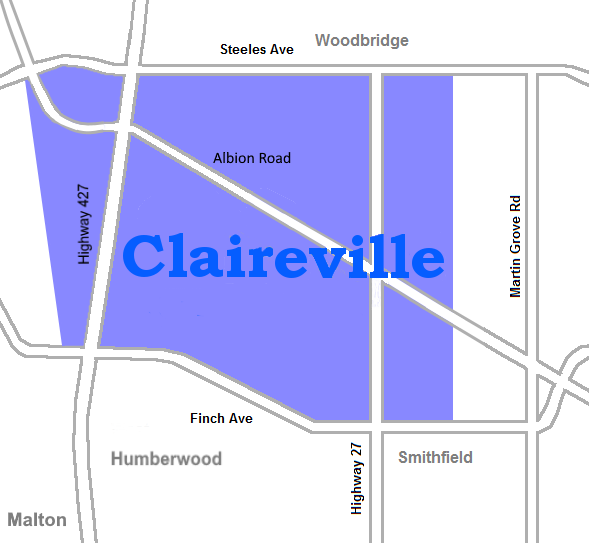
- Coordinates: 43°45′00″N 79°38′20″W
- Country: Canada
- Province: Ontario
- City: Toronto
- Community: Etobicoke-York
- Established: 1849 (Subdivision)
- Changed Municipality: 1998 Toronto from Etobicoke

Government
  - MP: John Zerucelli (Etobicoke North)
  - MPP: Doug Ford (Etobicoke North)
  - Councillor: Vincent Crisanti (Ward 1 Etobicoke North)

Claireville (sometimes misspelled as Clairville) is a neighbourhood and former hamlet in the city of Toronto, Ontario, Canada. It is located in the northwest corner of Toronto, in the former city of Etobicoke.

== History ==
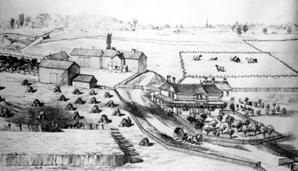
Guardhouse estate at top of Rexdale Blvd, 1878

The original hamlet was established in 1850 at the five-point intersection of Albion Road, Indian Line (later incorporated into Highway 50 and Highway 427), and Steeles Avenue. It was built on land owned by Jean du Petit Pont de la Haye (1799-1872), a French teacher at Upper Canada College. He developed the community on his estate which he named after his eldest daughter Claire Elizabeth (later Berthon b. 1831-d. 1903). Present-day Alcide Street is named after his son, Alcide, who used to practice medicine.

In the 1840s, a private planked road was built diagonally across northern Etobicoke by the Albion Road Company as a shortcut to Albion Township through Toronto Gore Township (now part of Caledon and Brampton), with a toll at Claireville. The road was originally named Claireville but was also called the Albion Road (the current name for the street).

Originally, Claireville was called Humber. It was given that name in the 1830s by the Post Office Department and had one of the earliest post offices in the county, delivered with mail daily due to its proximity to multiple surrounding farming townships in pre-railway days. The first building, a public hotel/dwelling, was erected in 1832, followed by a congregational church. By the 1870s, there were two hotels and numerous local businesses that had started up, and the village had reached a population of 200.

=== Development ===
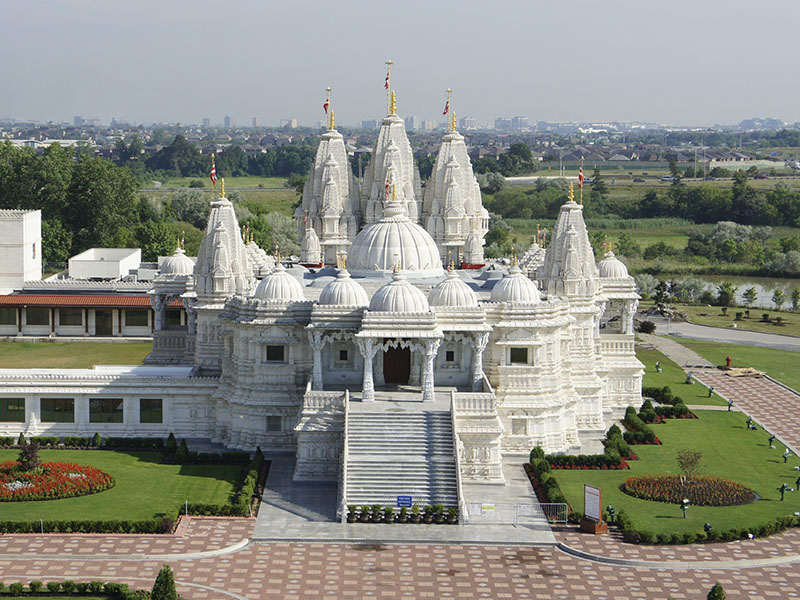
BAPS Shri Swaminarayan Mandir near the West Humber River

A flood control dam was built on the West Branch of the Humber River immediately south of the village in 1957, creating the Claireville reservoir and the establishment of Claireville Conservation Area. Claireville began to lose its rural character as suburban industrial development encroached. In the mid-1980, Albion Road and Steeles Avenue were realigned, bypassing the community. In the 1970s Highway 427 was built along the Indian Line alignment along the southwestern edge of the neighbourhood and in the 1990s was extended to Highway 407 when that toll road was built just to the north. This combined with the existing rail lines and proximity to Pearson Airport make the area prime industrial land. Today, some of original residential homes have disappeared in the Toronto section of Claireville and replaced with warehousing and open storage / trucking uses, and most of the remaining homes are no longer used as residences.

Claireville has today unofficially expanded into Brampton, with the portion west of an abandoned portion of former Indian Line and Highway 427 being in Brampton. Like in Toronto, the Brampton Portion largely consists of residential subdivisions, north of Queen Street. The Indian Line Campground is situated in Malton (Mississauga), near the south end.

The area is close to the large south Asian communities of Rexdale, as well as Brampton and Malton outside the city. This accessible area with large cheap lots has become home to several Hindu temples, most notably the BAPS Shri Swaminarayan Mandir Toronto.

== Education ==
The Toronto District School Board operates an elementary school in the neighbourhood. Claireville Junior School provides a space for approximately 375 students in grades Junior Kindergarten to grade five. The school engages with the neighbourhood through partnerships such as the Holiday Food Drive with the Daily Bread Food Bank. The school accepts co-op student placements from local high schools, and teacher candidates from York University, University of Toronto and other faculties of Education.

== Institutions ==
- Skyway Industrial Park
- Glendale Memorial Gardens
- Westwood Arena
- Apotex
- HBC warehouse
