= Bramalea, Ontario =

Bramalea
- Suburban district
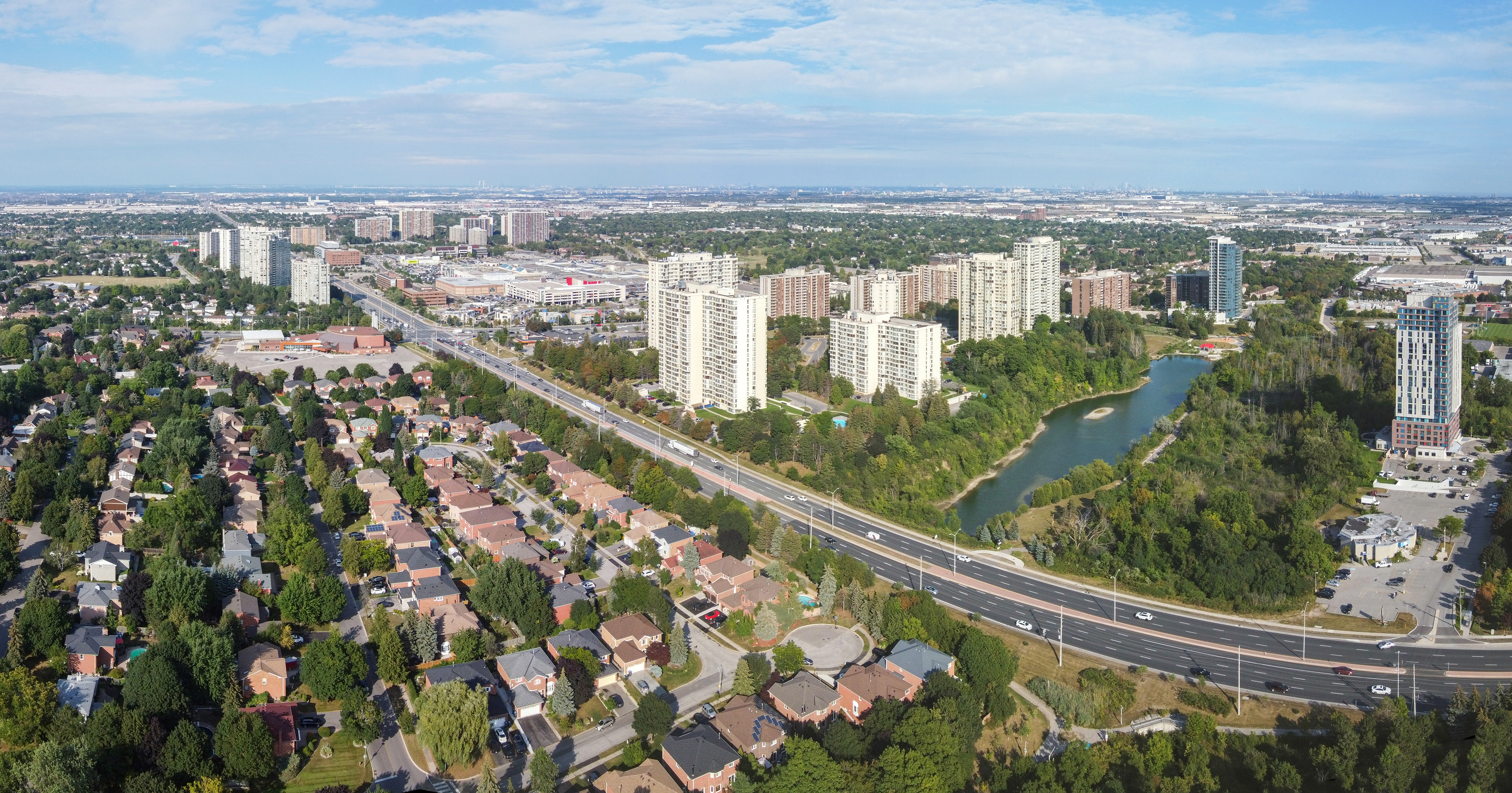
- Aerial view of Bramalea in 2021
- Interactive map of Bramalea
- Coordinates: 43°43′30″N 79°43′3″W
- Country: Canada
- Province: Ontario
- Regional municipality: Peel
- City: Brampton
- Established: 1960s as new town
- Forward sortation area: L6T
- NTS Map: 030M12
- GNBC Code: FALIC

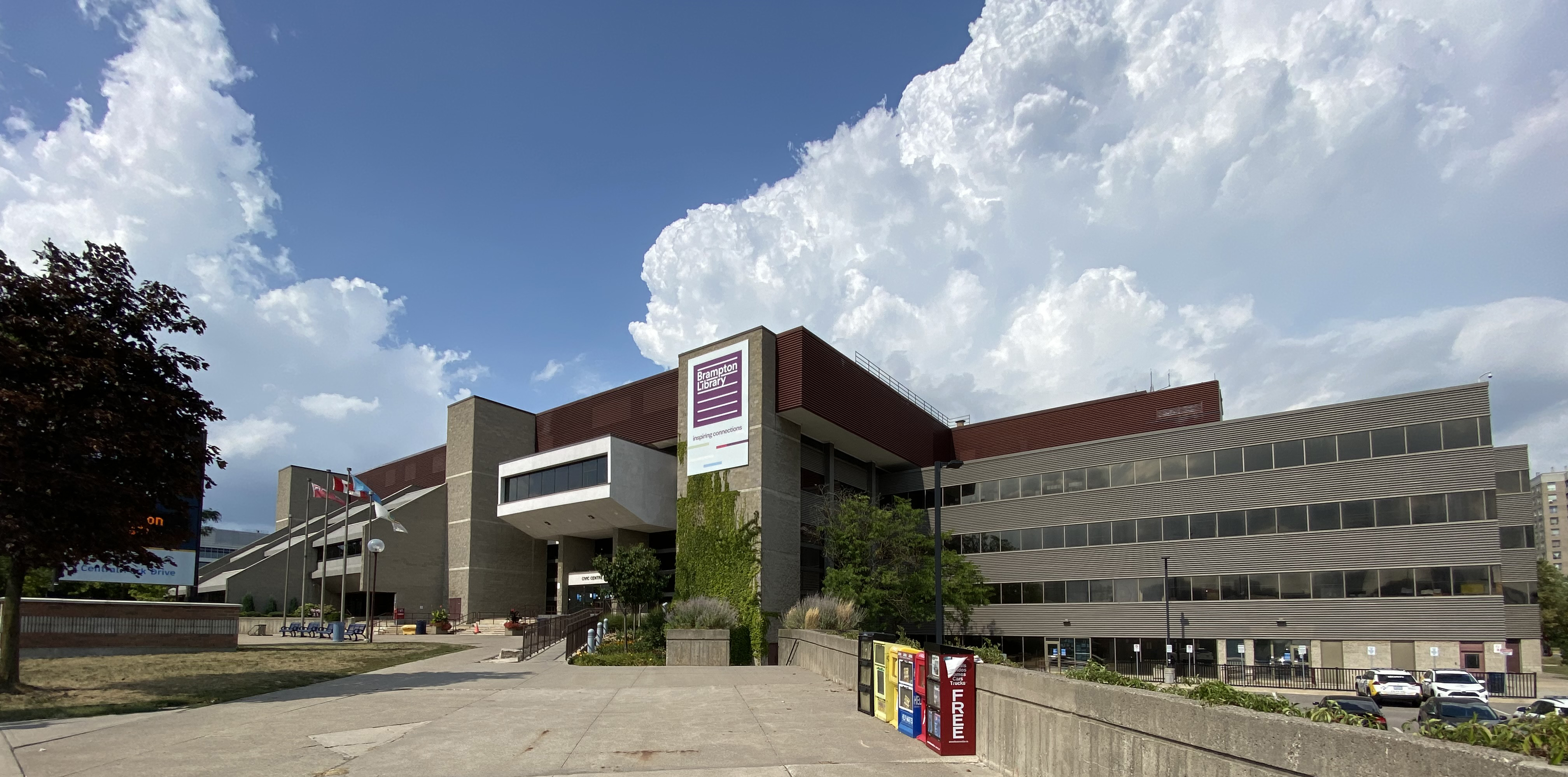
Bramalea Civic Centre building, originally the home of the Chinguacousy Township offices, also housed several municipal services, including a public library, until 2023, when they moved to make way for a medical school, which opened in 2025.

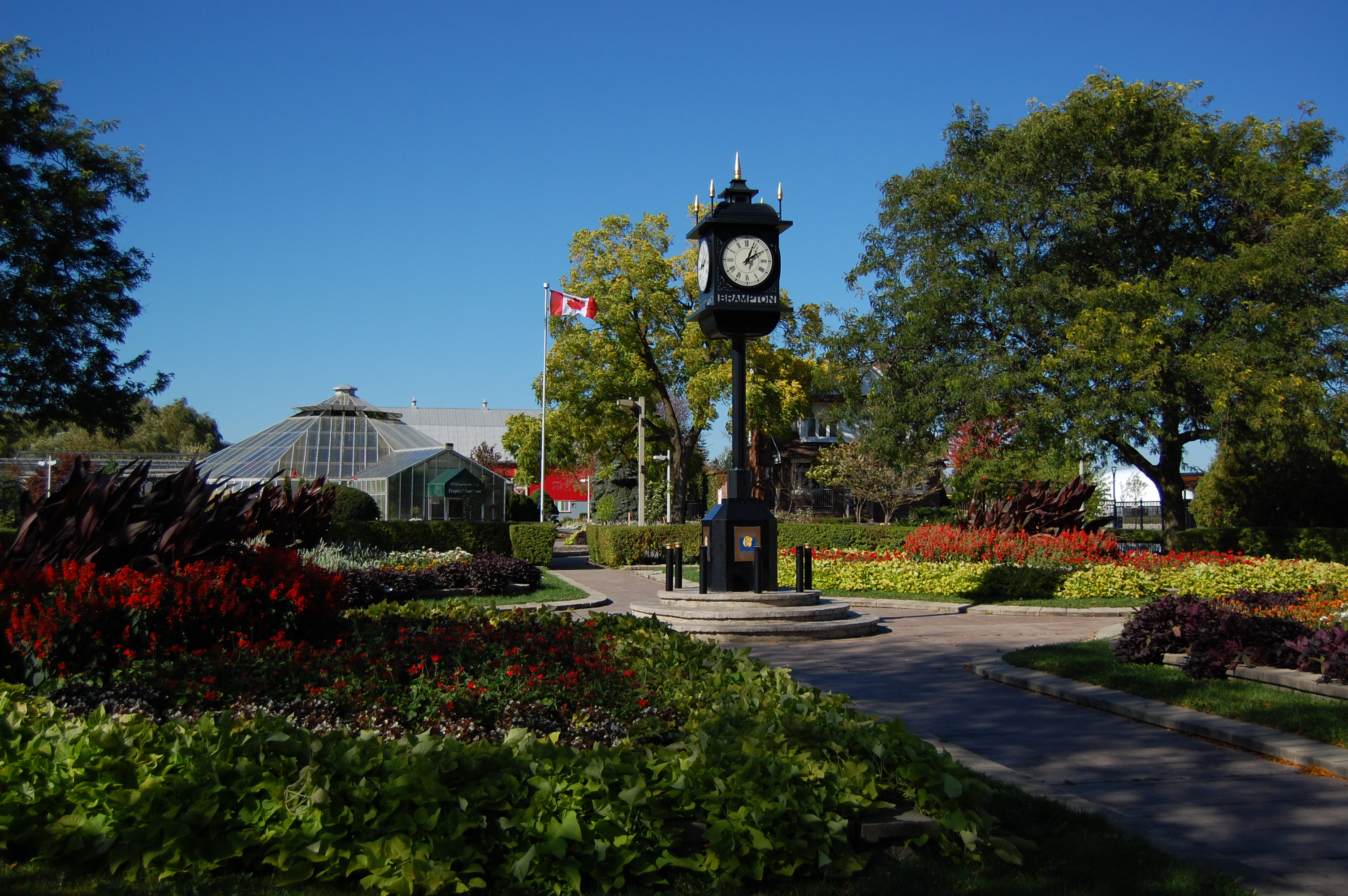
Chinguacousy Park Clock, with the Greenhouse in the background

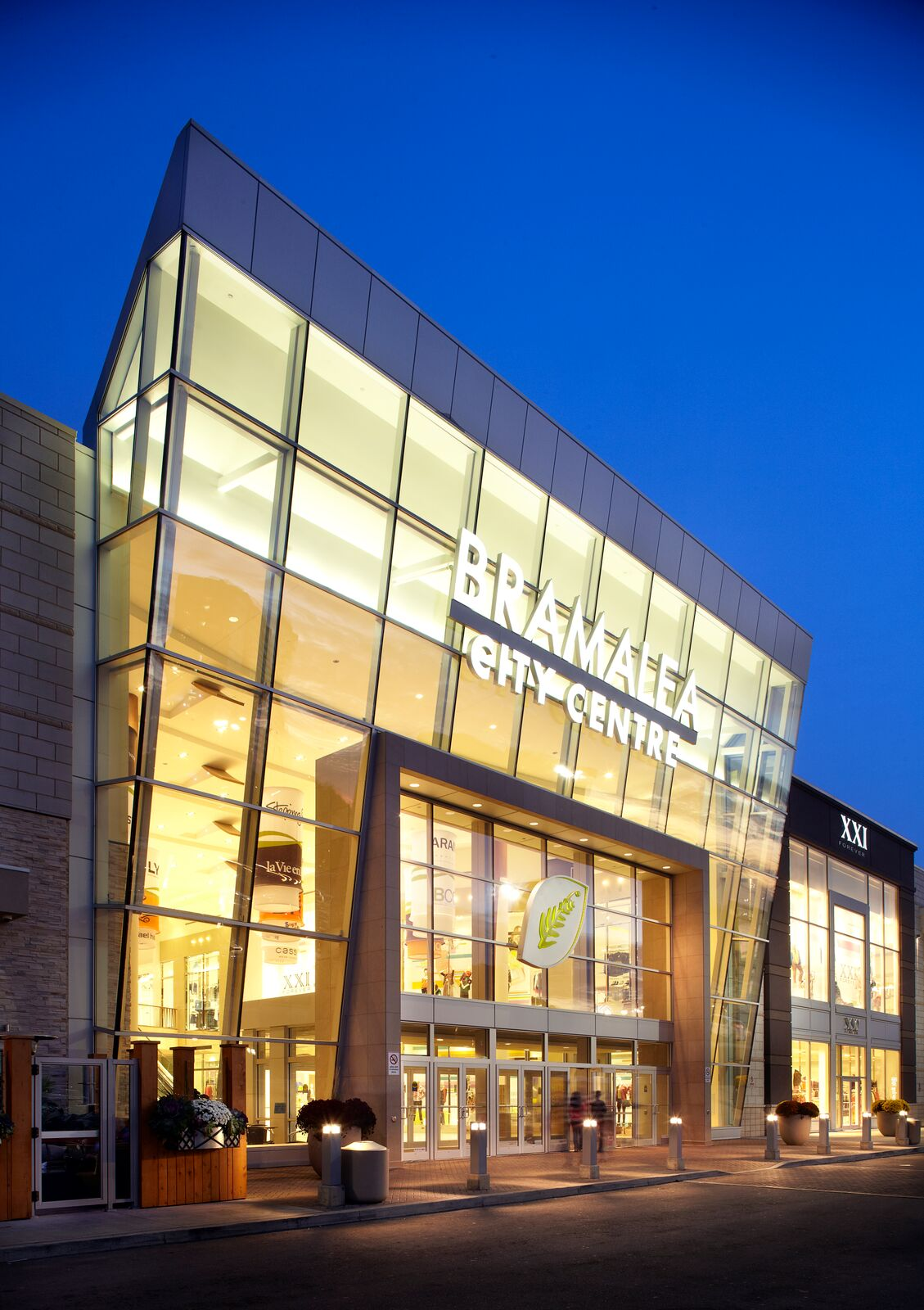
Bramalea City Centre

Bramalea (Bram-a-lee) is a large suburban district in the City of Brampton, Ontario, Canada. Bramalea was created as an innovative "new town", and developed as a separate community from the original Town of Brampton. Located in the former Chinguacousy Township, it was Canada's first satellite community developed by one of the country's largest real estate developers, Bramalea Consolidated Developments (later Bramalea Limited).

The name "Bramalea" was created by the farmer William Sheard, who integrated the BRAM from Brampton, MAL from Malton (then a neighbouring town which is now a part of Mississauga), and the LEA, an old British word meaning meadow or grassland. He sold the land to Brampton Leasing developers and built one of Bramalea's first houses on the intersection of Bramalea Road and Avondale Boulevard. Mr. Sheard owned a large parcel of cattle grazing land that was purchased by the new venture.

The community had an extensive Master Plan, which included provisions for a parkland trail system of "green belts" that followed small rivulets that feed the Etobicoke Creek and a "downtown", which would include essential services and a shopping centre. The downtown area's centrepiece was the Civic Centre, which included the township's council chamber, a library, live stage theatre, fire dispatch control centre, post office, and the fledgling Rogers Cable community production centre. This building was funded and built by Bramalea's agreement to maintain a particular balance of residential/industrial taxation base. In default, and in lieu of cash payment, Bramalea offered the Civic Centre as recompense. The township accepted.

Shortly thereafter, the Township of Chinguacousy was merged along with the township of Toronto Gore with the Town of Brampton, to become the City of Brampton. Directly across Team Canada Drive from the Civic Centre, Bramalea Limited had built a shopping centre starting in the late 1960s named Bramalea City Centre. The two centrepieces were connected by a short underground passageway under Team Canada Drive, which has long since been sealed due to "hooligan" activities. Other features included a police station, which was built before the other structures, (closed in 2008 in order to move into the new Peel Region offices), a bus terminal which was built as a "dial-a-bus" hub, a Holiday Inn (closed and being converted into a senior's residence), and a collection of seniors' retirement homes. Chinguacousy Park was created nearby, to the northeast of Bramalea Road and Queen Street. A ski hill was built up using fill excavated from residential basements.

Each phase of the new city was built with progressing first letters of street names. Development started with the "A" section, with street names like Alderbury, Argyle, Avondale, and Aloma. Then a "B" section was created, a "C" section, and so forth, eventually reaching the M, N, and P sections in the last areas to develop south of Bovaird Drive. Most incorporated local schools, greenspace and pathways. The Zero Lot Line housing concept was pioneered in the G- and H-sections ("The Villages of Central Park"), in an affordable housing joint venture between developers and the Ontario Government called the Home Ownership Made Easy ("HOME") project. Zero Lot Line housing are residential structures built directly on or within inches of the property line, eliminating one side yard to maximize usable lot space. Bramalea is bordered by Bovaird Drive East to Steeles Avenue East (North to South) and Highway 410 to Airport Road (East to West).

Bramalea is the location of the Stellantis Canada automotive plant, which used to be a Chrysler facility that had been developed by American Motors for the manufacture of its Eagle Premier sedan (a joint venture with Renault).

GO Transit provides commuter rail service to the district at Bramalea GO Station, located at Steeles Avenue and Bramalea Road.

== Education ==
Peel District School Board operates Bramalea Secondary School.
