= Claireville, Brampton =

District of Brampton, Ontario, Canada

- Unincorporated community
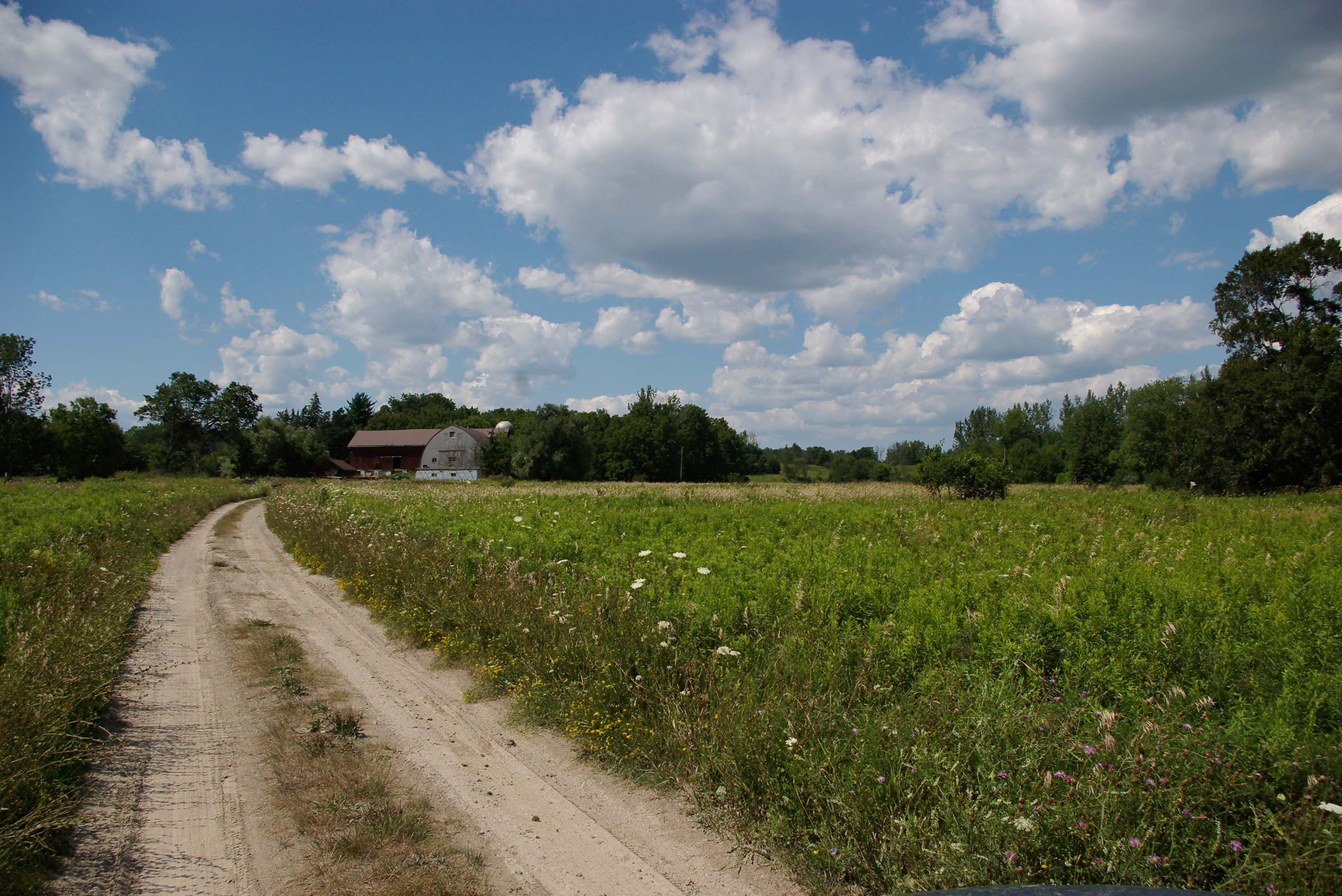
- Interactive map of Claireville, Brampton
- Coordinates: 43°45′0″N 79°38′12″W
- Country: Canada
- Province: Ontario
- Regional municipality: Peel
- City: Brampton
- Time zone: UTC-5 (EST)
  - Summer (DST): UTC-4 (EDT)
- Forward sortation area: L??
- Area codes: 905 and 289
- NTS Map: 030M13
- GNBC Code: FAQYW

Claireville is a district of Brampton, Ontario, Canada. It is the westerly extension of the Claireville neighbourhood of Toronto, west of the boundary between Toronto and Brampton. The former hamlet of Ebenezer is found within Claireville.

The name Claireville originates from a nearby historical village located in Toronto, however it is now mainly associated with the Claireville Conservation Area prominent in the region, which is one of the largest natural regions in the Greater Toronto Area. Until the early 2000s, the region was largely dominated by agricultural lands with small pockets of industrial and estate residential areas. However, subdivisions are currently being developed throughout the area north of Queen Street East.

Riverstone Golf and Country Club and Indian Line Campground are the only non-industrial or residential uses in the area.

== See also ==
- List of unincorporated communities in Ontario
