= Rose Theatre Brampton =

Theatre in Brampton, Ontario, Canada

Coordinates: 43°41′13.78″N 79°45′36.37″W

The Rose Brampton
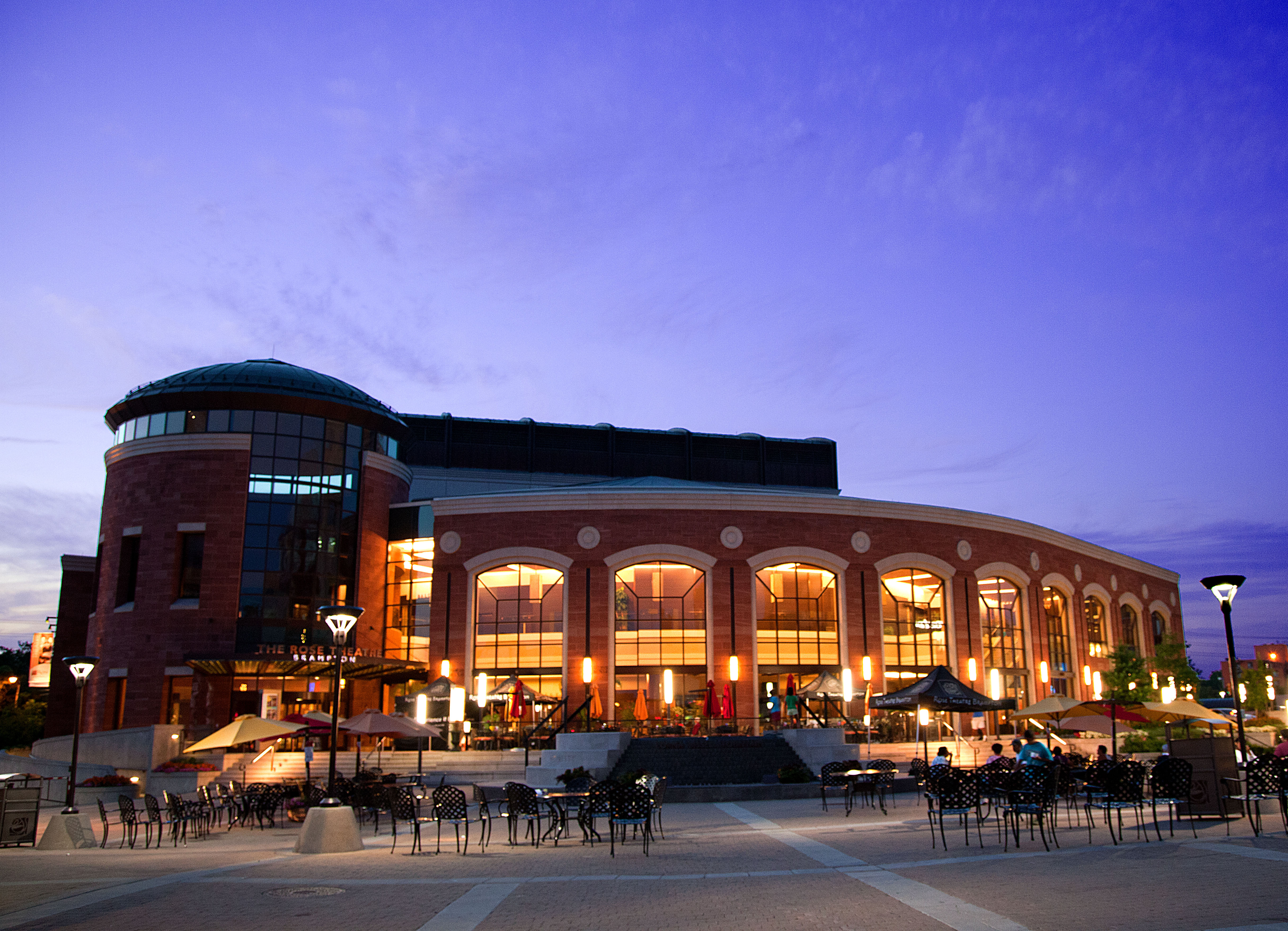
- Exterior of The Rose
- Interactive map of The Rose Brampton
- Address: 1 Theatre Lane, Brampton, ON L6V 0A3; Canada
- Owner: City of Brampton
- Capacity: 868
- Type: Performing Arts Centre
- Parking: Yes – Free on evenings, weekends, holidays and for 1 hour during weekdays. Hours of operation: Monday to Friday 9:00am to 7:00pm. Hourly Rates: First hour is free; $1.00 per ½ hour; $9.00 daily maximum

Construction
- Opened: September 2006
- Years active: 2006–present
- Cost: $55 million
- Architect: Page + Steele Architects

Website
- rosetheatre.ca

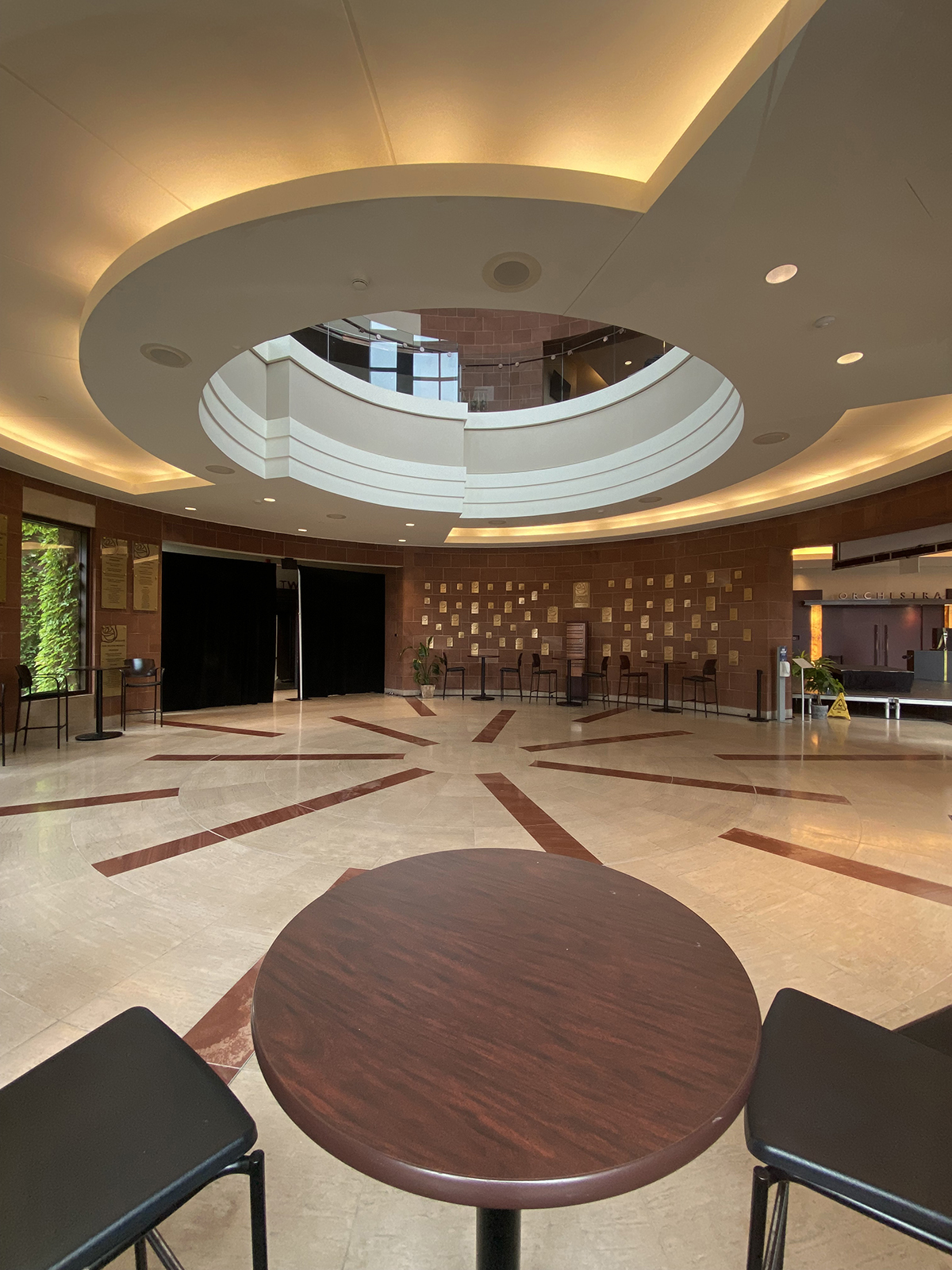
Lobby seating

The Rose is a municipally owned theatre located in downtown Brampton, Ontario. Originally Rose Theatre Brampton, a series of public events throughout September 2006 culminated in a grand opening on 29 September featuring Diana Krall. The theatre includes a main performance hall with seating for 880, and a smaller multi-purpose hall with seating for 130–160, depending on configuration

It was built as "a cultural and tourist destination that will attract significant new business to surrounding restaurants, shops and services". City planners projected that the facilities would generate $2.7 million in economic activity in its first year of operation, and grow to $19.8 million by the fifth year. This is predicted to attract more than 55,000 visitors annually who will spend about $275,000 on before and after-show entertainment, creating close to 300 permanent jobs.

The Rose is home to the Rose Theatre Summer Series. The Series is a summer stock theatre festival which includes various theatrical pieces. The shows are in three different venues: The Main Stage, Studio Two and Garden Square.

== History ==
Construction of an underground parking garage began in the fall of 1994 by Inzola Construction. The Farmers Market, which had been held on the level parking lot behind the buildings of the north-east quadrant of Four Corners, was moved to Main Street during the 1995 season once construction on the parking garage was underway. The Queen's Square Infrastructure Project was completed in 1997 and named Market Square Parking.

The parking lot had nothing built on top for a number of years. A mixed-use condo tower was not built because engineers determined the ground would not support the weight of the structure. A movie theatre was also suggested and rejected.

On 15 April 2002 City Council "...committed to building a new Theatre in the Downtown Core..." The project had the name "Market Square Theatre"

The Market Theatre was designed by Page + Steele Architects and constructed by Aecon Buildings of Aecon Group Inc. Named the Rose Theatre Brampton, it opened in September 2006. The theatre included an outdoor public square, known as Garden Square. Over time, Brampton residents referred to the theatre as "The Rose."

In May and June 2008, construction included renovations to the surroundings and the installation of a fountain stage.

It was the final stop of the 2010–2011 American/Canadian national tour of The Wizard of Oz.

The building ran on generators in summer 2011, due to electrical problems. Electricity was shut off again in late October 2011, due to water seepage in the electrical room. Running off generators, the theatre cancelled a concert and two performances of I, Claudia. Other shows continued without heat, elevators, and with much of the parking garage closed off, deemed too dark. The outage lasted from 27 October to 11 November. In March 2016 the theatre hosted a comedy performance by Howie Mandel.

== See also ==
- Living Arts Centre, Mississauga, Ontario
- Markham Theatre, Markham, Ontario
