= Claireville Conservation Area =

Conservation area in Ontario, Canada

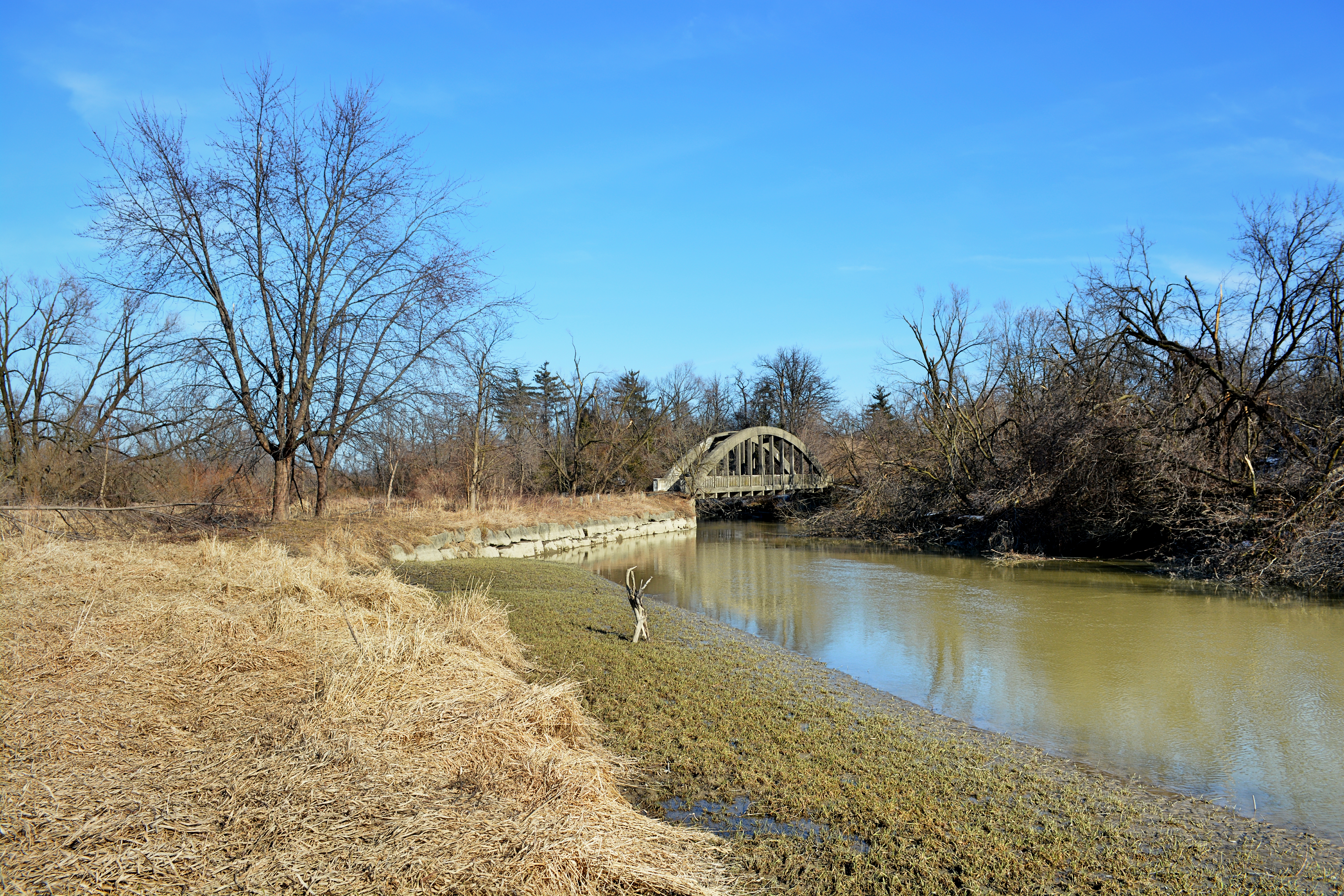
- West Humber River in Claireville Conservation Area

- Location within Ontario
- Location: Brampton, Peel, Ontario, Canada
- Coordinates: 43°45′15.97″N 79°38′31.88″W
- Area: 343 ha (850 acres)
- Elevation: 167 m (548 ft)
- Established: 1957
- Named for: Former Claireville village (present-day Claireville, Toronto)
- Governing body: Toronto and Region Conservation Authority
- Website: trca.ca/parks/claireville-conservation-area/

The Claireville Conservation Area is a suburban conservation area located on the border of Peel Region and Toronto in Ontario, Canada. The major part of the area is located in Brampton. The park is a 343 hectare (848 acre) parcel of conservation land located on the west branch of the Humber River. It is one of the largest tracts of land owned by the Toronto and Region Conservation Authority (TRCA). Claireville contains significant natural and cultural heritage features, and has recreation, tourism, and educational facilities and programs.

== History ==
The Area was acquired in 1957 to construct a flood control dam and reservoir after the destruction caused by Hurricane Hazel.

In 2003, in partnership with HSBC Bank, a contributor to the TRCA foundation, 150 volunteers planted over 850 new trees and shrubs in the area, creating 7.5 hectares (18.5 acres) of forest.

The TRCA has declared an early 20th-century farmhouse in the northern part of Claireville as a heritage property; major restoration began in 2005.

== Landscape ==
The park is a favorite with local dog owners, bird watchers and wildlife photographers. The landscape of the park is diverse. Its characteristic features are numerous creeks and ravines, flat plains, and rolling hills enriching the forested landscape.

A multi-year natural area enhancement plan has been developed for Claireville. Some of the recommended activities of this plan include:

- Protecting and enhancing significant blocks of interior forest habitat and reforestation.
- Enhancing public use and access to internal trail network and installing wildlife structures such as nest boxes for waterfowl and song birds; brush piles for small mammals; and in-water structural habitats like stumps, logs, and rocks for a variety of fish.

== Fauna ==
The park is home to the eastern coyote, wood duck, chimney crayfish, deer, muskrat, and common garter snake. The park's varied landscape can be admired from many vantage points.

=== Birds ===
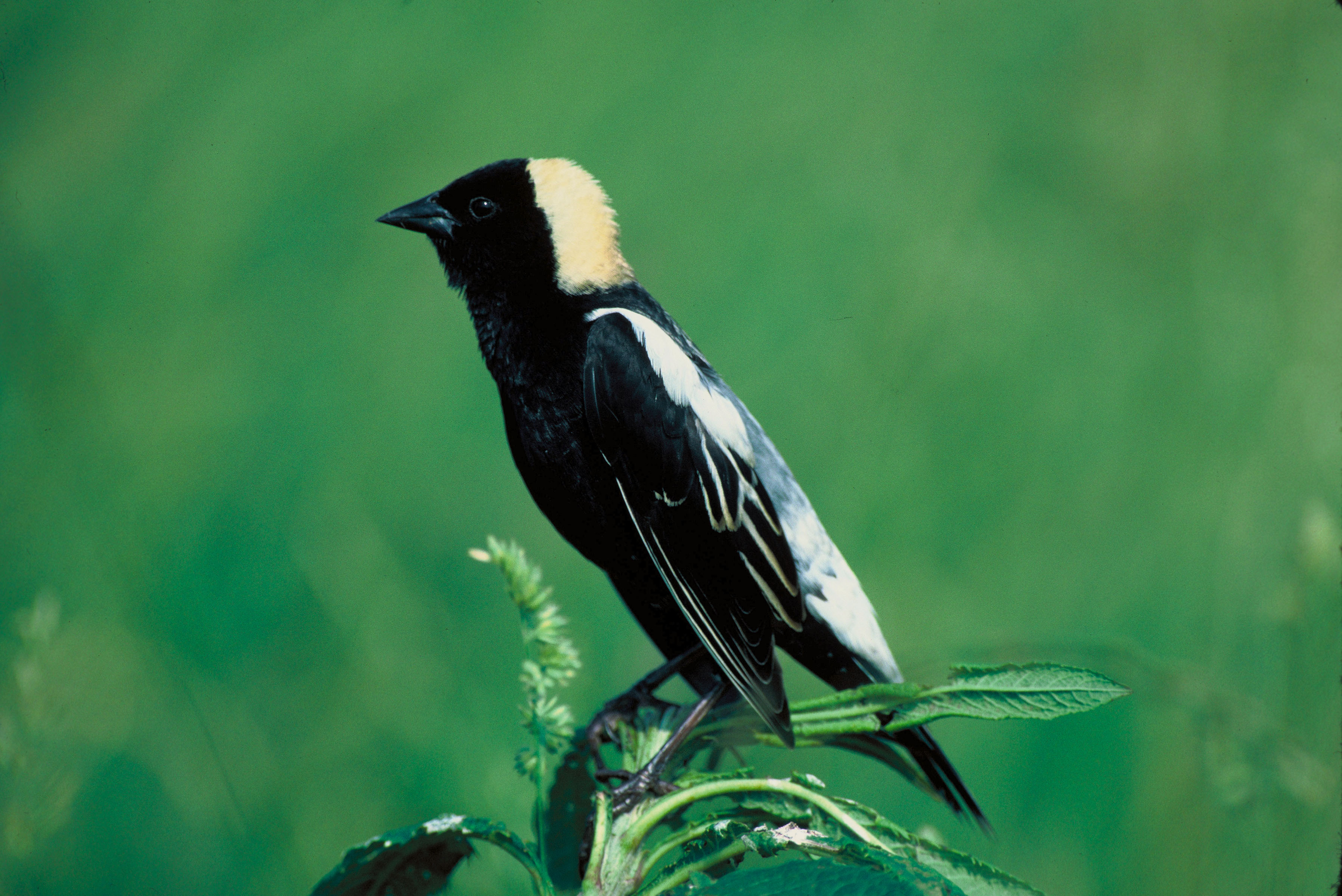
Bobolink

Dozens of bird species can be seen. Some use the park as a stop on their migratory route, while others breed in the park.

In open fields

- Eastern meadowlark
- Red-winged blackbird
- Bobolink
- American woodcock
- Savannah sparrow

In the forest

- Rose-breasted grosbeak
- Pileated woodpecker
- Red-eyed vireo
- Blue jay
- American robin
- Great-crested flycatcher
- Hairy woodpecker
- Scarlet tanager

Semi-Open brush

- Northern oriole
- Eastern kingbird
- Field sparrow
- House wren
- Yellow shafted flicker
- Indigo bunting
- Grey catbird
- Brown thrasher

Ponds, marshes, river banks

- Wood duck
- Tree swallow
- Mallard
- Song sparrow
- Bank swallow
- Rough-wing swallow
- Eastern phoebe
- Cliff swallow

=== Fish ===
Common year round are: brown bullhead, carp, creek chub, goldfish, largemouth bass, pumpkinseed, rock bass and white sucker. The seasonal species include yellow perch and amphibians.

=== Rare white deer ===
There have been sightings of a rare white deer. These are not albino deer, but rather a product of a recessive gene in some species of deer. In this case it is a white, white-tail deer. These white deer can vary in their percentage of white, with freckles or mottling in many patterns. They sometimes have deformed feet and ankles but otherwise exist within the herd as normal deer. Offspring can be of normal colouring or sometimes demonstrate the recessive gene.

== Location ==
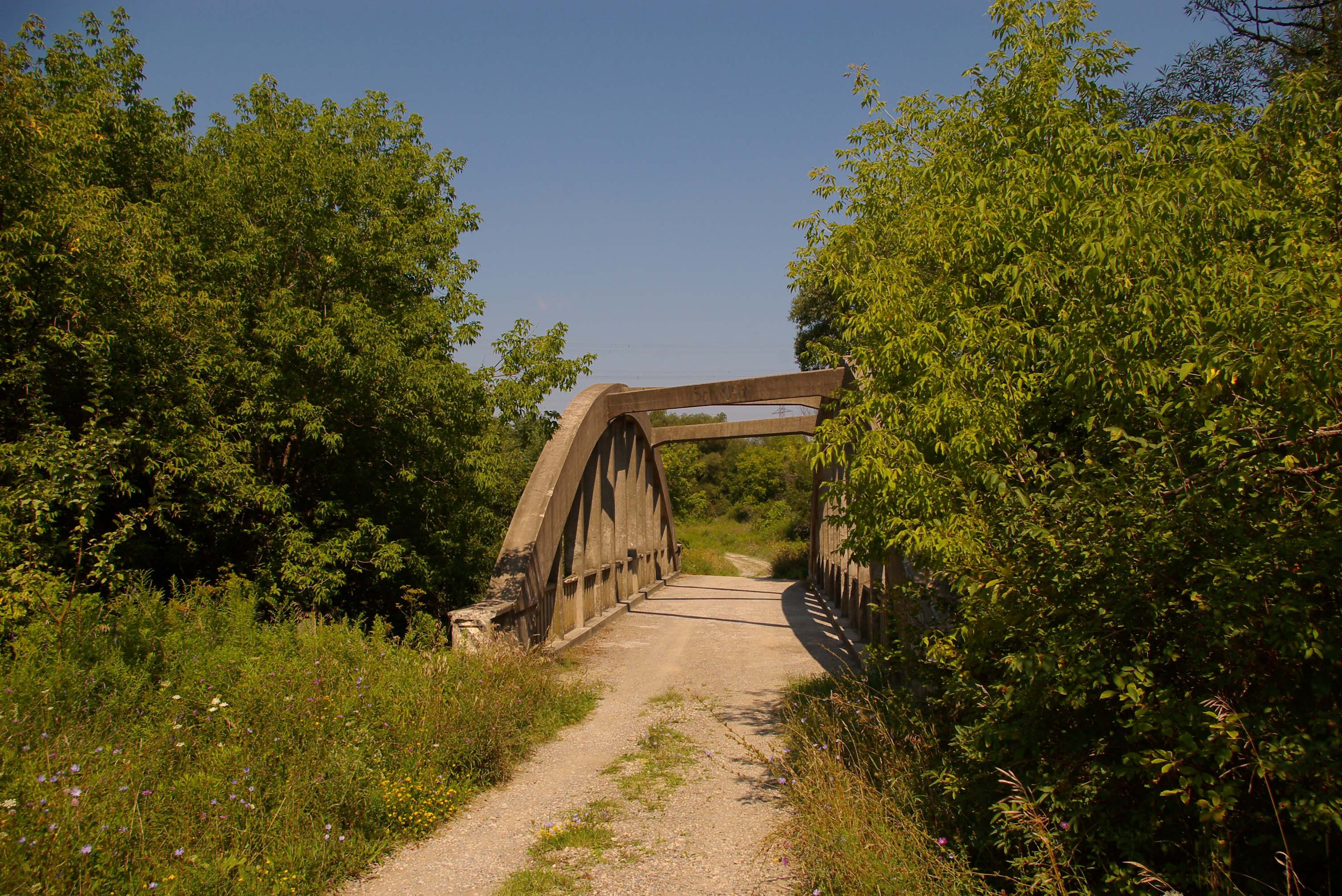
Bridge crossing on West Humber River

Parking is available at the east and north gates, and at the HSBC forest area. The south gate is located on Gorewood Dr, while the east gate is on Regional Road 50 just north of Steeles Avenue (the Etobicoke Field Studies Centre is just a short walk from this gate). The north entrance is located at the intersection of McVean Dr. and Regional Road 107 (the Claireville Ranch entrance). The northernmost area of the park is the HSBC forest; it is located on McVean Dr. 1 km north of Queen Street.

== Facilities ==
The Etobicoke Field Studies Centre is located in the southern corner of Claireville and provides programs for student from Grade 1 to Grade 6. Located in the northern corner of the park is the Claireville Ranch, which provides horse riding lessons, trail riding and other group activities. The Indian Line Campground, a family campground, is located in the Brampton section of the park. It offers 245 serviced and unserviced campsites.
