= Brampton City Hall =

Municipal building in Canada

Coordinates: 43.6849°N 79.7593°W

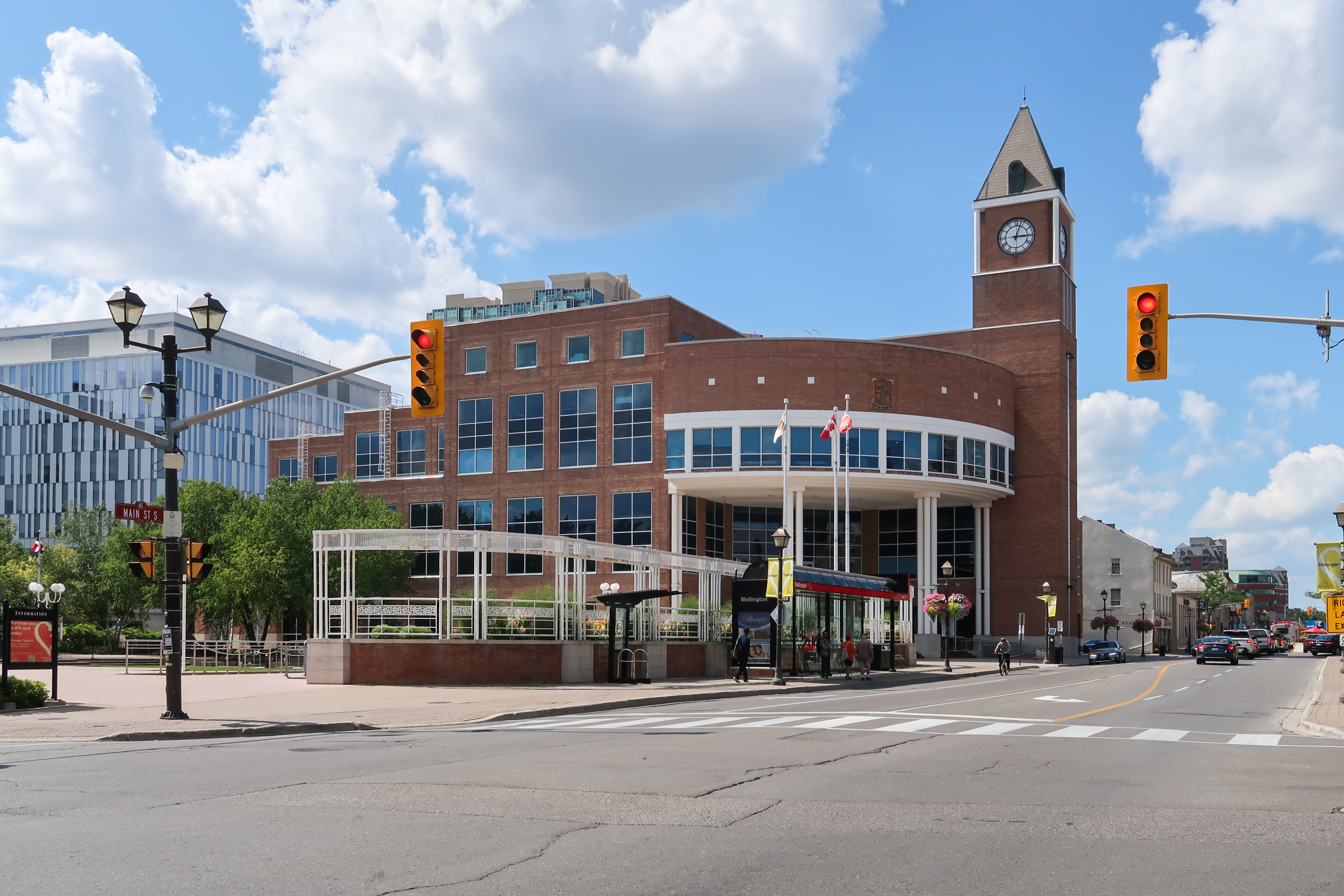
- Interactive map of the Brampton City Hall area

General information
- Location: Brampton, Canada

Design and construction
- Architect: Robert Posliff

Brampton City Hall is home to Brampton City Council and the departments of the city. It is located at the intersection of Wellington Street and Main Street in downtown Brampton.

== History ==
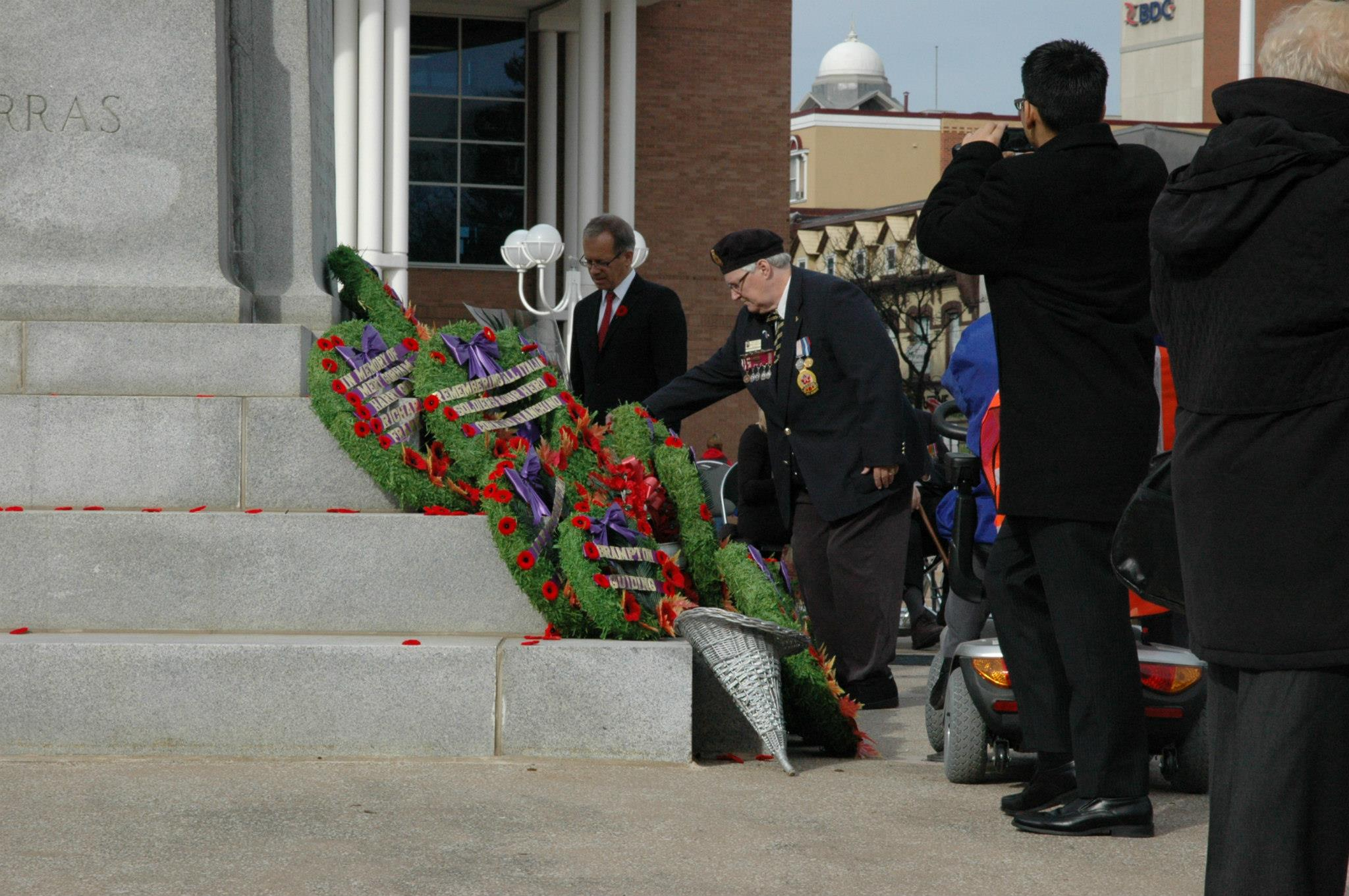
Veteran placing a poppy at the Brampton cenotaph in Ken Whillans Square

A park on the site for many years was home to the Brampton Cenotaph (opened in 1928 by Governor General Lord Willingdon), it was named Memorial Park. (A park at South Fletcher's Sportsplex now uses the name and the old former park named Ken Whillans Square) A downtown bus terminal on part of the site opened after 1976 and was closed at some point before 1989, to accommodate construction of the building. (bus services have been relocated to the Downtown Transit Centre)

The six-storey building was designed by Robert J. Posliff Architect Inc. The project was completed in December 1990, with move-in occurring in June 1991. The building features a bell tower and a curved entrance with columns. A two-storey addition was also added.

A nine-storey tower opened in 2014 at 41 George Street as part of the Southwest Quadrant Renewal Plan and is connected to City Hall by a glass walkway called Heritage Way. It will house city staff, community rooms and retail space. The site required the demolition of a 4-storey commercial building and a parking lot. It is also a functioning clock tower.

== List of former municipal offices ==
- Brampton's Old Fire Hall, built in 1854 at 2 Chapel Street, was originally a market hall. The second floor "long room" was being used by the village council chambers by 1860. The first meeting of Brampton Town Council took place here in 1874. Council meetings were held here until 1911. It is now regimental office space for the Brampton Armoury, home to the Peel Company of the Lorne Scots (Peel, Dufferin and Halton Regiment).
- Heggie Block, (built 1860) at 8 Main Street South, was home for town meetings from 1911 until 1965. Named for Dr. David Heggie, who acquired the building in 1897 and used it for his medical practice as well as his residence. Now mixed use building with ground floor restaurant and residential units in upper floors in original structure and additional in the rear.
- Queen's Square Building (completed 1965) at 24 Queen Street East was home to Council meetings from 1965 until 1974. Renovated by Inzola Construction in 2001 and renamed Market Square Business Centre.
- Chinguacousy Civic Centre opened in 1972 at 150 Central Park Drive and is home to the Lester B. Pearson Theatre. Home to Brampton City Council from 1974 until 1991, it also housed the Civic Centre branch of the Brampton Public Library, which closed in 2023 and relocated to a temporary home at the ski chalet at Chinguacousy Park to make way for the Toronto Metropolitan University's School of Medicine, which opened in 2025.

== See also ==
- Peel Art Gallery, Museum and Archives – located near City Hall
