= Ebenezer, Brampton =

Coordinates: 43.772°N 79.665°W

Location of Ebenezer in Ontario

Ebenezer is a former hamlet in Brampton, in Ontario's Regional Municipality of Peel. In recent years, the locality has undergone considerable residential development.

== Former Ebenezer Schoolhouse ==
A notable historical building in the area is the former Ebenezer Schoolhouse with its distinctive bell tower, built in 1892 and located at 4494 Ebenezer Road. It served as Council Chambers for Toronto Gore Township until 1973, when the township was incorporated into the City of Brampton. The building, designated under the Brampton Heritage Board, is now known as Ebenezer Community Hall.
