= Highway systems by country =

This article describes the highway systems available in selected countries.

== Africa ==
=== Algeria ===
As of 2026, Algeria has approximately 1,600 km (990 mi) of motorways in operation.

=== Botswana ===
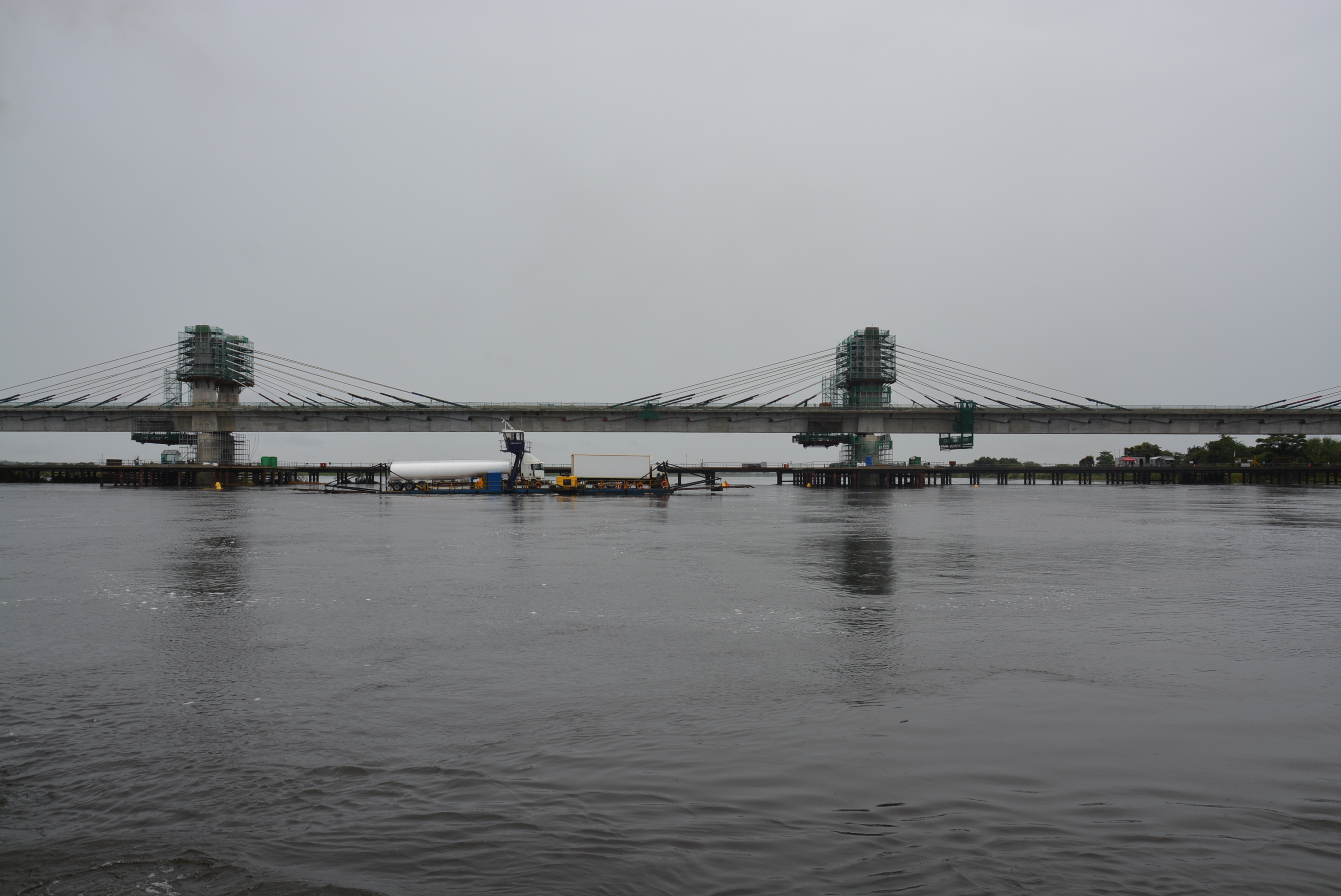
Kazungula Bridge, connecting Botswana and Zambia

Botswana has a network of roads, of varied quality and capacity, totalling about 31,747 km (19,727 mi). Other than these, 20,000 km (12,000 mi) are paved (including 134 km (83 mi) of motorways). The remaining 11,747 km (7,299 mi) are unpaved. Road distances are shown in kilometers and Botswana speed limits are indicated in kilometers per hour (kph) or by the use of the national speed limit (NSL) symbol. Some vehicle categories have various lower maximum limits enforced by speed limits, for example trucks.

=== Morocco ===
Morocco has more than 1,800 km (1,100 mi) of highways. Many have been constructed from 2000 to 2015 to link major Moroccan cities. Now that Large and Medium cities have access to highways, the Moroccan highway agency is planning to link smaller cities to the network.

=== Nigeria ===
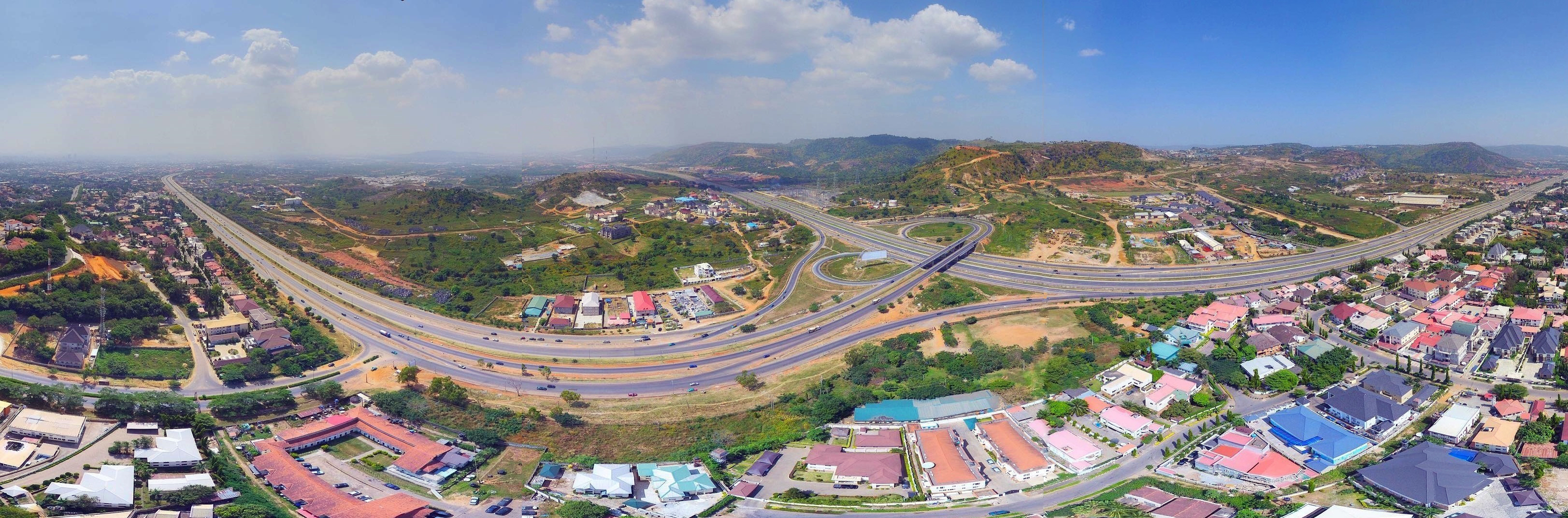
Abuja Highway panoramic

The Federal Highway System of Nigeria, also known as Trunk A national roads, connects economic and political centers within the country; in addition it links Nigeria with neighboring countries. These roads are constructed and maintained by the Federal Government of Nigeria through the Federal Ministry of Works and the Federal Roads Maintenance Agency. In 1974, some roads previously maintained by the states were transferred to the federal government. This created a classification called Trunk F roads. The road system in Nigeria is classified for administrative purposes as Trunk Road A, or federal roads, Trunk Road B and Trunk Road C. This system of road classification began in 1946. The Trunk Road A or federal roads are roads under the federal government ownership and they are developed and maintained by the federal government. As of April 2003, federal roads constitute 17% of the total road network in Nigeria.

=== South Africa ===
Colloquially, the terms freeway, highway, and motorway are used synonymously. The term expressway is not common in South Africa. A freeway, highway or motorway refers to a divided dual carriageway with limited access, and at least two lanes in either direction. A central island, usually either with drainage, foliage, or high-impact barriers, provides a visible separation between the carriageways in opposite directions. As in the United Kingdom, Ireland, Australia, and Japan, South Africans drive on the left-hand side of the road and nearly all steering wheels are on the right-hand side of vehicles.

Freeways are designated with one of three labels: N (in reference to national roads), R (short for route, in reference to provincial roads), and M (in reference to metropolitan roads). This has more to do with the location of a road and its function than anything else. In addition, "N" roads usually run the length of the country over long distances, "R" roads usually inter-connect cities and towns within a province, and "M" roads carry heavy traffic in metropolitan areas. Route markings also determine who paid for the road: "N" was paid for by national government, "R" by provincial government, and "M" by local government. In recent years, some "R" roads have been re-designated as "N" roads, so that control and funding comes from the South African National Roads Agency.

=== Zimbabwe ===
Zimbabwe has one of the better road networks in Africa that had been poorly maintained until recently. There has been an introduction of toll gates and the dualization of most of the major roads.

== Americas ==
=== Brazil ===
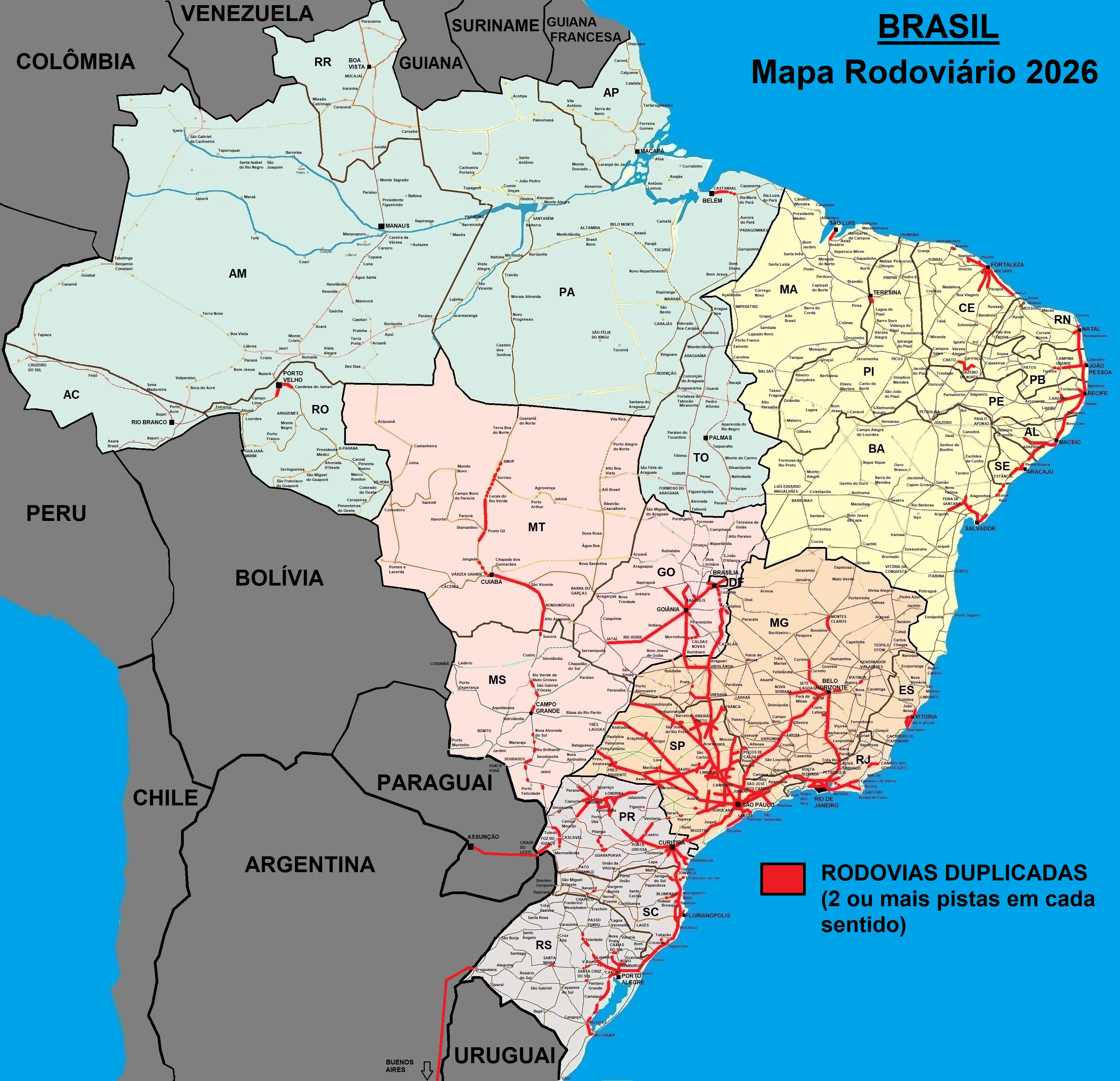
Road system in Brazil, with divided highways highlighted in red

In Brazil, highways are called rodovia, and Brazilian highways are divided into two types: regional highways (generally of less importance and located entirely within a state) and national highways (of major importance to the country, most of which are trunk roads). In Brazil, rodovia is the name given exclusively to paved roads connecting two or more cities with a sizable distance separating the extremes of the highway. Urban highways for commuting are uncommon in Brazil, and when they are present, they receive different names, depending on the region (Avenida, Marginal, Linha, Via, Eixo, etc.). Very rarely are names other than rodovia used. Unpaved roads are called estrada.

Regional highways are named YY-XXX, where YY is the abbreviation of the state where the highway is running in and XXX is a number (e.g. SP-280; where SP means that the highway is running entirely in the state of São Paulo).

National highways are named BR-XXX. National highways connect multiple states altogether, are of major importance to the national economy and/or connect Brazil to other countries. The meaning of the numbers are as follows:

- 001–100 – the highway runs radially from Brasília. It is an exception to the cases below.
- 101–200 – the highway runs in a south–north direction.
- 201–300 – the highway runs in a west–east direction
- 301–400 – that the highway runs in a diagonal direction (northwest–southeast, for example)
- 400–499 – another exception – less important highways whose function is to connect a city to an arterial highway nearby.

Often, Brazilian highways receive names (of famous people, etc.) on top of their YY/BR-XXX designation (example: SP-280 is also known as Rodovia Castelo Branco).

=== Canada ===
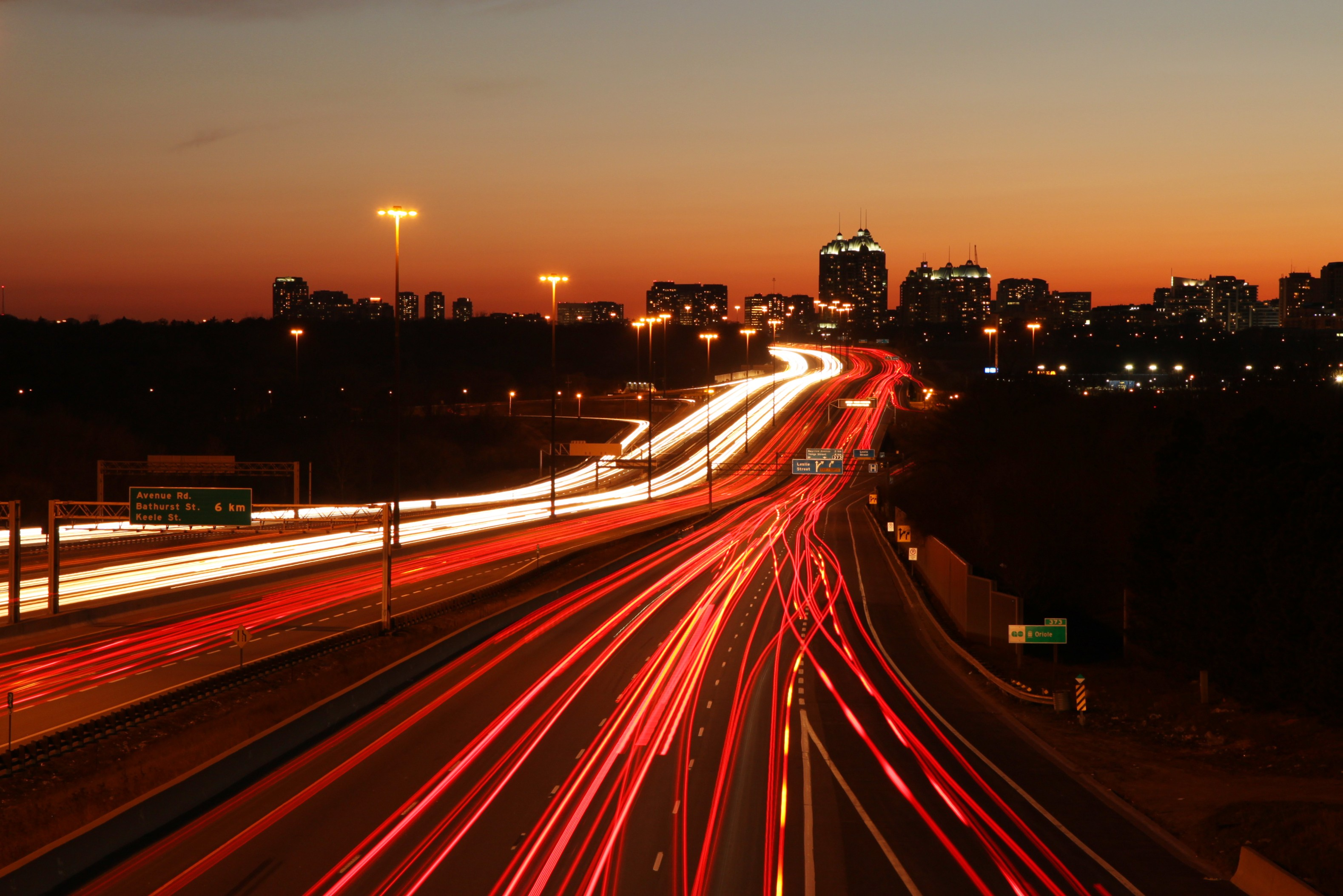
Evening traffic on Highway 401, North America's busiest highway, in Canada

In Canada, there is no national standard for nomenclature, although in non-technical contexts highway appears to be most popular in most areas. The general speed limits on most Canadian highways range between 80 km/h (50 mph) and 110 km/h (68 mph) on two-lane highways rural and urban highways and between 80 km/h (50 mph) and 120 km/h (75 mph) on multi-lane, divided highways. Prairie provinces are known for having higher speed limits than Central Canada and the Maritimes because of the flat geography and more car-dominant way of life; however, British Columbia remains the only province in Canada to have a speed limit of 120 km/h (75 mph) on the Coquihalla Freeway.

Canada is the second-largest country in the world in terms of land area, though it only has 1,350,581 km (839,212 mi) of paved roads. This is far less highway and road distance than the United States, which is smaller, but has more than 6,000,000 km (3,700,000 mi) of paved roads and highways. However, Canada has more roads and highways than Russia, the largest country in the world in land area, with an estimated just 336,000 km (208,000 mi) of paved roads.

The most extensive freeway network in Canada is in the well-populated southeastern Canada, linking southern Ontario, southern Quebec, Nova Scotia, New Brunswick, and the United States. This makes the freeway network there very well-travelled, requiring these routes to be well-maintained to overcome the frequently harsh winter weather, wide enough to accommodate the high traffic volumes that they carry in large metropolitan areas (such as around Toronto, Montreal, Ottawa, and Detroit) in order to reduce the economic problems and frustrations that result from heavy traffic congestion, and also be safe enough to reduce the number of vehicle accidents.

Ontario has some of the busiest freeways in North America. It has all public roads legally defined as highways, though provincially managed roads are known legally as Provincial Highways. In day-to-day usage, the term highway is used for provincial routes or freeways. It is also common for surface routes to be referred to by number (e.g. "Take Highway 10 from Mississauga to Owen Sound"), especially by older generations. The words freeway or expressway are sometimes used to refer to controlled-access, high-speed, grade-separated highways such as the 400-series highways, the Gardiner Expressway, the Don Valley Parkway, the Conestoga Parkway, or the E.C. Row Expressway. The only highway officially labelled as a freeway is the Macdonald–Cartier Freeway, usually known as Highway 401, or simply "the 401", which is North America's busiest freeway, as well as one of the widest in the world at 18 through lanes in the section passing through Toronto. The Queen Elizabeth Way was the first intercity divided highway in North America. Nearly all highways in Ontario use parclo interchanges, which were developed by the province. Parclos are used to avoid weaving and to maximize efficiency and safety.

In Quebec, major highways are called autoroutes in French, and expressways or autoroutes in English. Highways in Quebec have contributed to the spread of Phragmites australis, the common reed, as an invasive species. The common reed is particularly common among warm or agricultural areas and in highways built before the 1970s.

Nova Scotia numbers its highways by the trunk routes they parallel. For example, Highway 107 parallels Trunk 7. This, to a lesser extent, also applies in Ontario (e.g. Highway 410 and Highway 420 parallel Highway 10 and Highway 20.) Nova Scotia also numbers its highways according to usage: main arterial highways are in the 100s, secondary or old arterial highways are numbered in the double digits from 1 to 28, and collector roads are numbered in the triple digits starting at 200.

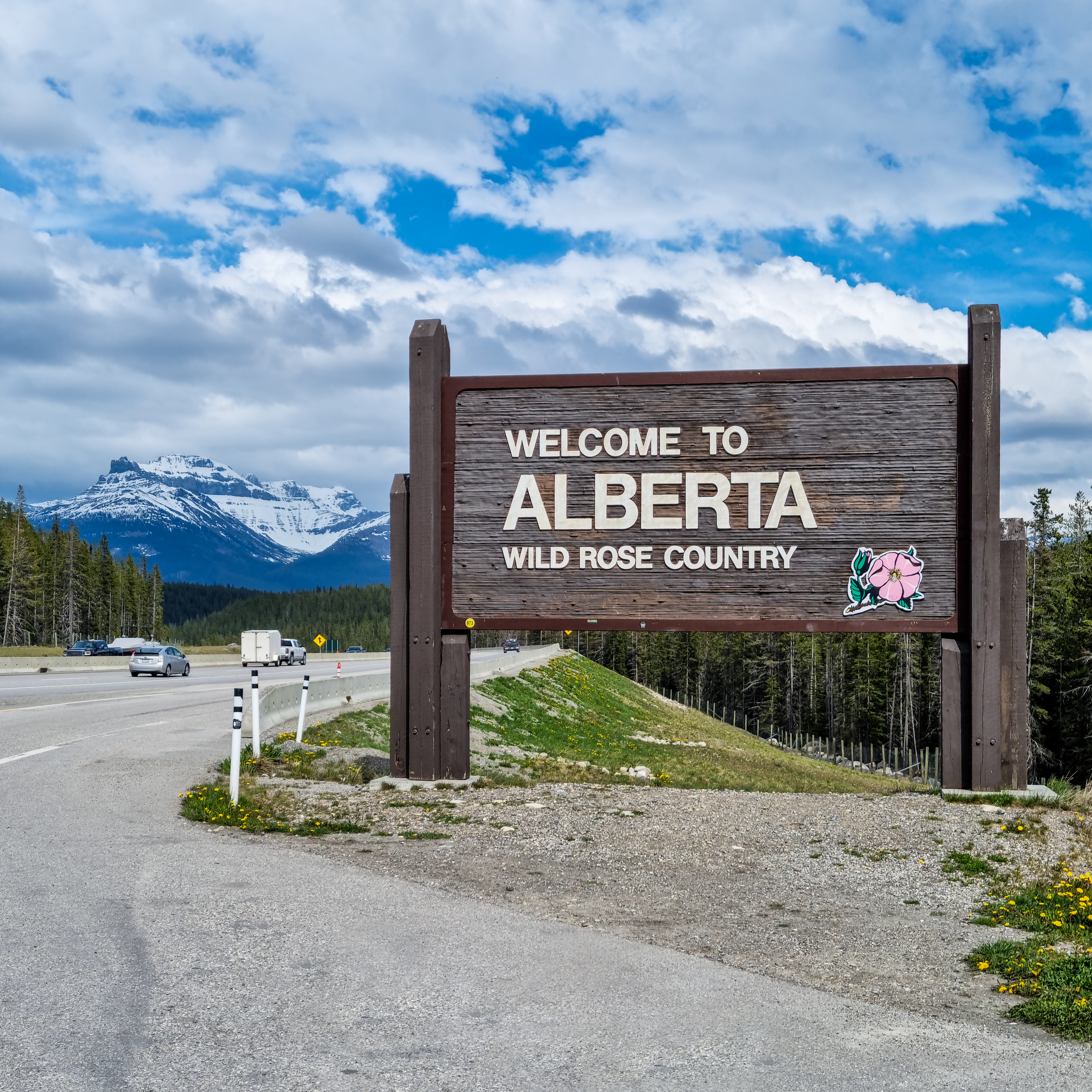
The Trans-Canada highway in Alberta

The Trans-Canada Highway (or Trans-Canada) is the longest national highway in the world. It crosses all of Canada from east to west and enters all ten provinces. The highway was initiated by 1949 Trans-Canada Highway Act, and funding began in 1951. However, the highway was not finished until 1970.

The Trans-Canada ranges from a two-lane highway as it runs through the mountains of British Columbia with occasional divided highway status as the province commits to twinning the road, a full divided highway with some sections qualifying as freeway status throughout Alberta and Saskatchewan, a mixture of both throughout Manitoba, a two-lane at-grade highway again as it passes through the sparsely populated areas of northern Ontario, and a multi-lane freeway as it travels through southern Ontario, southern Quebec, New Brunswick, and Nova Scotia. There are three or more ferry routes along the Trans-Canada, which allows it to connect to Newfoundland, Prince Edward Island, Haida Gwaii, and Vancouver Island. The Confederation Bridge provides an alternative route from New Brunswick to Prince Edward Island.

Since the Trans-Canada Highway is not yet a divided, multi-lane freeway for its entire length, the section that crosses the western provinces and northern Ontario is considered to be more of an equivalent to the U.S. Route highway network in the neighboring United States. Southern Ontario's 400-series freeways, Quebec's autoroutes, New Brunswick's portion of the Trans-Canada, Nova Scotia's 100-series highways, Alberta's Ring Road system, and Saskatchewan's Ring Road system are provincial equivalents to the American Interstate Highway System. The Canadian freeways interconnect with each other across provincial lines, and also with the American Interstate system. For example, freeways in Québec connect Montreal with the American border, and thence Interstate 87 continues from there to New York City, and likewise, Toronto is connected to the border by Ontario freeways, and thence by Interstate 190 to Buffalo, New York.

The Government of British Columbia spent $1.482 billion (in today's money) on highways between 1954 and 1969. This represented between 10% and 25% of all spending by the provincial government during this period, though it varied from year to year.

=== Chile ===
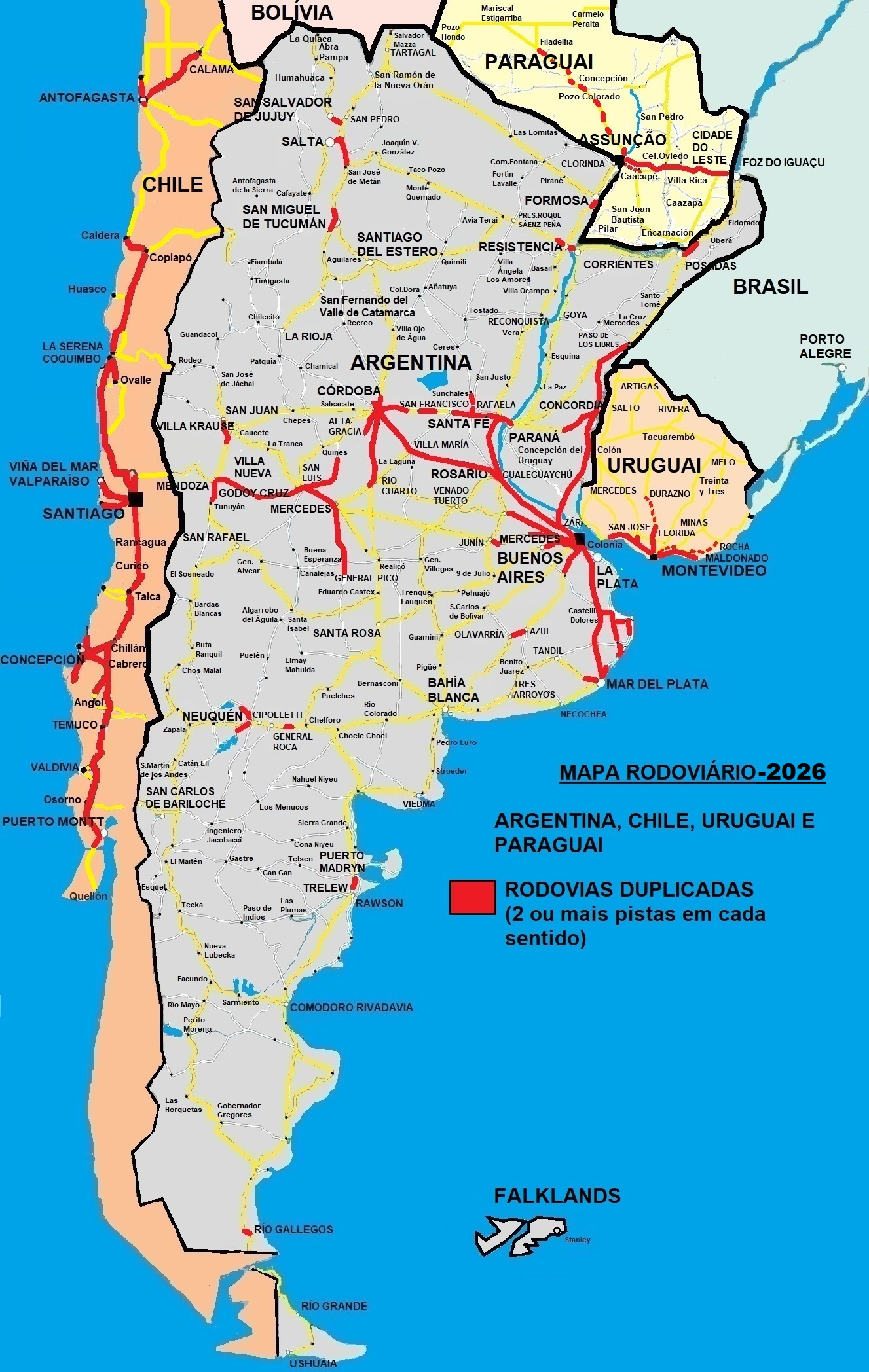
Road system in South America, with divided highways highlighted in red

Chile has significant highway coverage connecting the whole country, with the exception of the Magallanes region.

=== Colombia ===
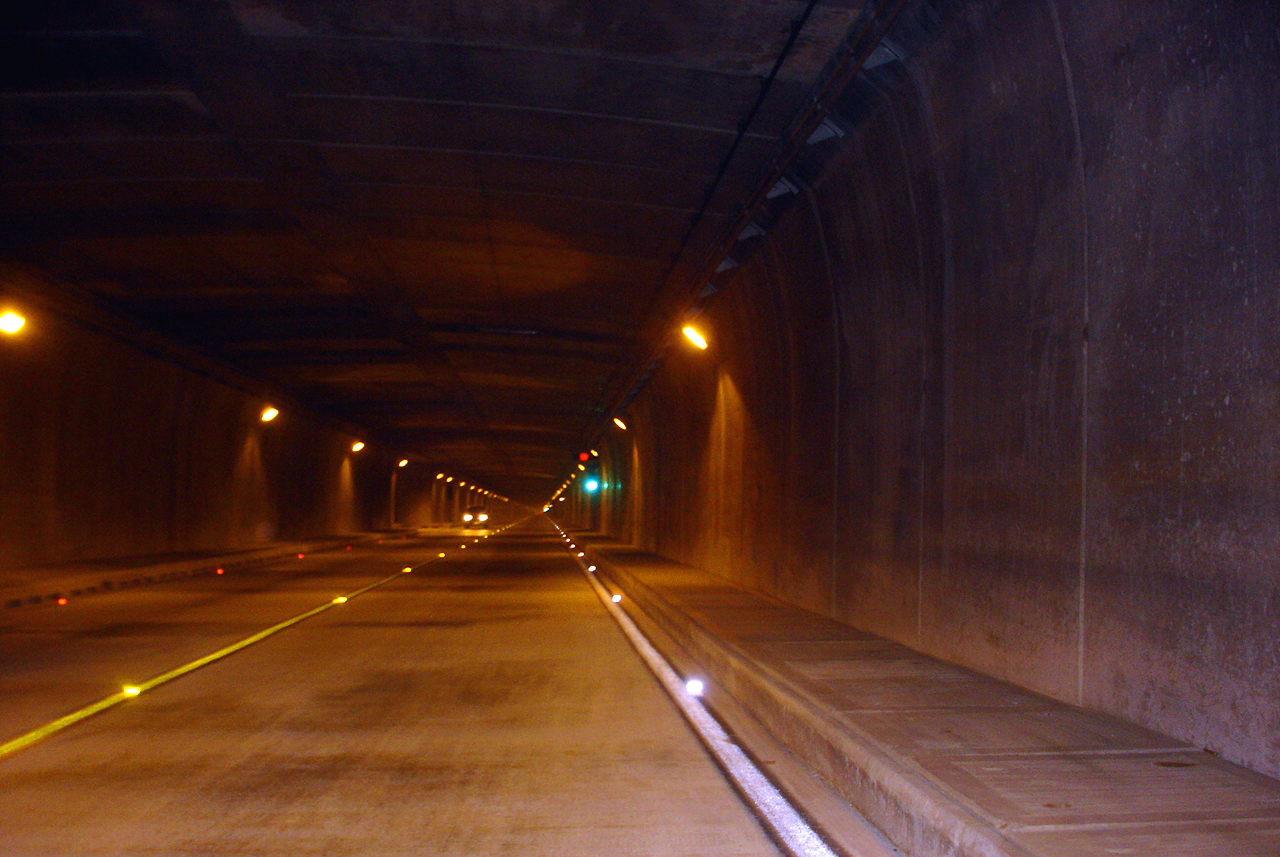
Occidente tunnel, Antioquia

In Colombia, highways are managed by the Colombian Ministry of Transport through the National Institute of Roads. Colombia's road infrastructure is still very underdeveloped with most of the highways presenting a two-lane road for outbound and inbound traffic. Some exceptions are the Autopista Norte, linking Bogotá and the towns of Tunja and Sogamoso and the Highways of the Valle del Cauca, an infrastructure improvement project started about a decade ago which has not yet been entirely finished. Several dual-carriage ways also link cities like Medellín, Pereira, Manizales and Armenia.

Nowadays, direct public funding of highways is increasing, focused mostly on connecting Colombia's agricultural and industrial heartland with its Caribbean and Pacific ports through twinning existing roads and the construction of 5,892 km (3,661 mi) of roads.

The most important projects under negotiation or construction are La Ruta del Sol (the Sun Road), a four-lane highway between Bogotá and the Caribbean coast; and the Highway between Bogotá and Buenaventura (Colombia's largest and busiest port) which includes a 9 km (5.6 mi) tunnel.

=== United States ===
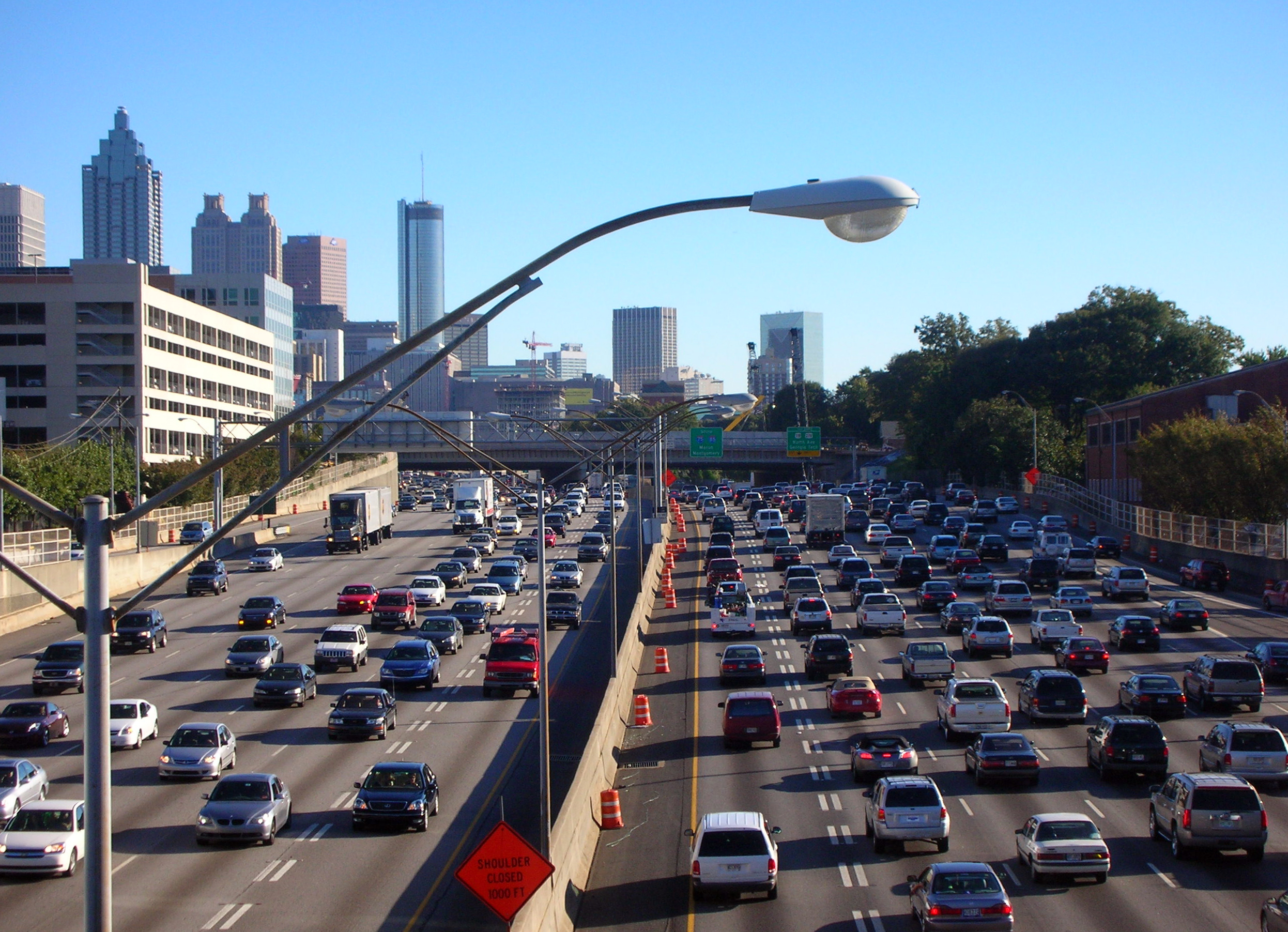
Interstate 75/Interstate 85 in Atlanta, a typical urban freeway in the United States

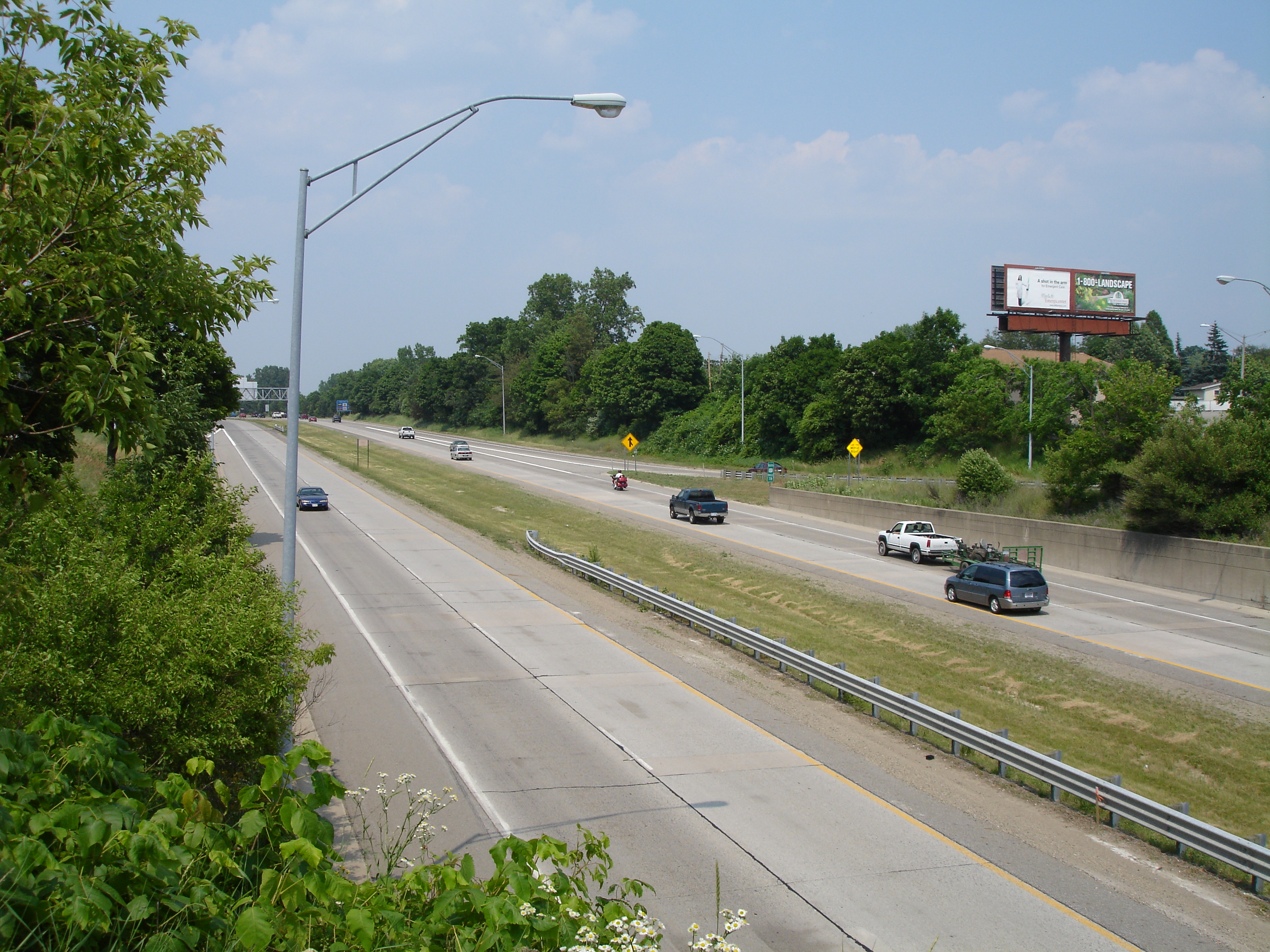
U.S. Highway 127 in Lansing, Michigan

In the United States, highway is a general term for denoting a public way, including the entire area within the right-of-way, and includes many forms:

1. a high-speed, limited-access road like expressways, two-lane expressway, freeways, and large toll highways.
2. an important road that connects cities and large towns.
3. any road or street, or a travel way of any kind, including pedestrian ways, trails, and navigable waterways, to which the public has a perpetual right of use.

Note that the phrase right-of-way is used differently in the United States than it is in the United Kingdom and certain other places. In the U.S. a highway or road right-of-way means the land on which the pavement rests, plus the shoulders beside the pavements, plus any median strip, plus any other adjacent piece of land that is designated for the purposes of the highway or road. In other words, the right-of-way is the strip of land for the highway or road, and a sign that says, "No Parking on Right-of-Way" means that drivers may not park on the pavement or on the land adjacent to it.

Many paved highways for vehicles are part of the official National Highway System of the U.S. As of 1996, these highways carry 90% of tourist traffic and 75% of truck traffic. The system includes:

- The Interstate Highway System
- 21 "high-priority corridors" named in the Intermodal Surface Transportation Efficiency Act of 1991
- The Strategic Highway Corridor Network (STRAHNET)
- Various roads connecting military installations to STRAHNET

Paved highways in the United States Numbered Highway System (for example, U.S. Highway 53) can vary from two lanes wide (one lane each direction), shoulderless, roads with no access control, to multi-lane high-speed controlled-access highway, such as the Interstate Highways. These roads are usually distinguished by being important, but not always the primary, routes that connect populated areas. (Sometimes, the primary route is a state highway.) Since their inception many decades ago, the construction of U.S. Highways, and their major improvements, have been paid for 50% with federal funds, especially from motor fuel taxes, and 50% with state funds from whatever tax resources that the state has. Thus, the system of U.S. Highways has always been an equal partnership between the federal government and the state governments. This was a plan that changed dramatically with the advent of the Interstate Highway System beginning in the 1950s, but the system of U.S. Highways still continued to be upgraded under the 50%–50% funding. Highways continue to be widened, old bridges continue to be replaced with newer and better ones, and so forth.

Map of all current Interstate Highways in the United States

The term highways in the U.S. even includes major paved roads that serve purposes similar to those of the U.S. Highways or Interstate Highways, but which are completely designed, paid for, and maintained by state or local governments. An example of this is M-6 (Michigan highway), which is an urban bypass of Grand Rapids, Michigan, that is a multi-lane, controlled-access highway entirely designed and paid for by Michigan. Much of the traffic uses it to bypass downtown Grand Rapids to make connections between Interstate 96, Interstate 196 and U.S. Highway 131.

The Interstate Highway System was created by the Federal Aid Highway Act of 1956, which authorized $25 billion in federal funds through 1969. When the Act of Congress that authorized the Interstate Highway System was passed and then signed by President Eisenhower, it was already clear that the Interstate Highways would be far more expensive, mile-for-mile, than the U.S. Highways had been. Because of their great cost, Congress decided to set the standard for federal funding for the Interstate System at 90%, leaving 10% for the states to pay for. This ratio was unprecedented: previous bills had set the ratio at 50/50 or 60/40. Many proposed highways would have run through ethnic enclaves. For example, various areas of Washington, D.C. were destroyed to make way for Interstate 395, and Black-majority areas in Detroit, Michigan were torn down to make way for Interstate 375.

Another monetary difference came from the fact that the Interstate Highways were to be designed to be high-speed and safe expressways. This meant that they needed to have much wider open strips of land along their sides to create safety zones on each side. This would allow vehicles that were in accidents or had simply lost control to have somewhere to go, slow down gradually, and not crash into obstacles. Roadway interchanges for Interstate Highways were also to be very large (and over the decades, they became a lot larger than anticipated in the 1950s). With so much land being taken away for the highways, the only way to justify it and to make it politically palatable was for the Federal and State governments to outright purchase all of the land. There could be no question of just having an easement for the highway and its right-of-way. All of the land within the right-of-way would be permanently owned by the governments, until such time that they decided to get rid of the highway and sell the land.

Economically, interstates drive activity within the counties they pass through, but draw activity away from neighboring counties. In particular, interstates tend to drive activity in the transportation and manufacturing industries, but lead to lower earnings in the agricultural, retail, and government industries.

In some places, highway is a synonym for road or street, and in some cases, the word highway is simply used in cases of carelessness and laziness on the part of the speaker, who believes that street, road, and highway are all synonymous and uses them accordingly. On the other hand, in another example, the California Motor Vehicle Code § 360 states: "'Highway' is a way or place of whatever nature, publicly maintained and open to the use of the public for purposes of vehicular travel. Highway includes street." The California Supreme Court has held that "the definition of 'highway' in the Vehicle Code is used for special purposes of that act", and that canals of the town of Venice, California, are "highways" also entitled to be maintained with state highway funds.

Federal and state governments are trying to improve their National Highway System components by repaving highways, widening highways, replacing bridges, and reconstructing some interchanges. Many cloverleaf interchanges are being converted to parclo interchanges. Busy diamond interchanges are also being converted to SPUIs (single-point-urban interchange) or to parclos to reduce interchange congestion.

Arguably, the most famous United States highway is U.S. Route 66. It is immortalized in the song "(Get Your Kicks On) Route 66", and by the TV series Route 66. Other famous highways in songs include [U.S.] Highway 61 (Bob Dylan, 1965), Carefree Highway in Arizona (Gordon Lightfoot, 1974), Colorado Boulevard in Pasadena, California (Jan & Dean, also Beach Boys, 1964), the song "Ventura Highway", named for a highway in Southern California ("America", 1972), and Blues Highway in Mississippi (Fred McDowell, 1959).

== Asia ==
=== Azerbaijan ===
Azerbaijan's highway network includes major international routes like the Baku-Alat-Ganja corridor (part of TRACECA) - (E60) and the North-South Transport Corridor. Other key highways are the M1 (E119), connecting the Russian border to Baku, and the M7 (E002) & (E99), which runs from Nakhchivan to the Turkish border.

=== Bangladesh ===
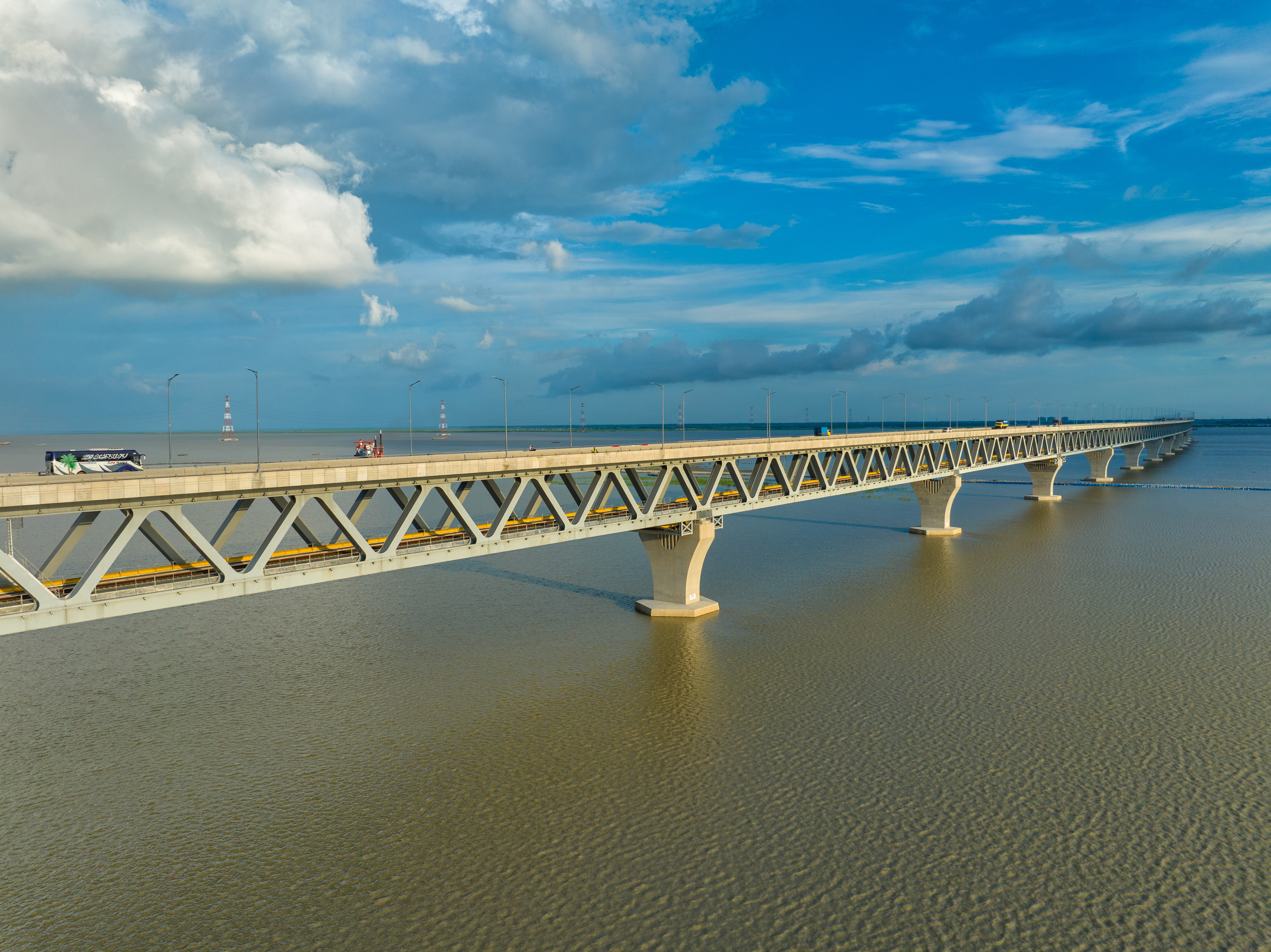
The Padma Bridge which carries National Highway 8.

In Bangladesh, Highway refers to the national highways, regional highways, and city highways. There are 8 major national highways and some 300 auxiliary regional highways. All 8 major highways connected Dhaka the capital of Bangladesh with major cities including divisional capital cities. While regional highways connects major cities with nearby small and midsize cities and towns across the country. And city highways often refers to the highway which cross through major cities and connects national and regional highways with these cities and provide the cities main in and out routes.

=== China, People's Republic of ===
Highways in China, more often than not, refer to China National Highways. The fully controlled-access, multi-lane, divided routes are instead called expressways. As of 2017, there were 5,980,000 km (3,720,000 mi) of highways and 131,000 km (81,000 mi) of expressways in China; both total lengths are the longest in the world.

In Mainland China, private companies reimbursed through tolls are the primary means of creating and financing the National Trunk Highway System (NTHS).

Expressways are lumped with first-grade G-prefixed guódào (国道, or 'national highway').

- G-prefix: National highways (typically expressways)
- S-prefix: Provincial highways
- X-prefix: County highways
- Y-prefix: Rural roads
- Z-prefix: Special use roads (e.g., airport expressways)

Some highways are numbered with a leading zero (e.g. G030).

The term freeway during the 1990s was used on a few expressways (such as the Jingshi Freeway). The term freeway has since been replaced with expressway on all signs in China. The Chinese name for expressways is 高速公路; in pinyin, it is gāosù gōnglù, which literally means 'high-speed public road'.

Signs on the National Highways (G-prefix) are green, while those on the lower-grade highways and urban expressways (S-prefix) are yellow.

=== Hong Kong ===
In Hong Kong, the type of high speed roads is referred to as expressway, but some are referred to as highways or roads ('Yuen Long Highway', 'Tolo Highway', 'Tsuen Wan Road', 'Tuen Mun Road', etc.). Others are named corridors and bypasses.

=== India ===
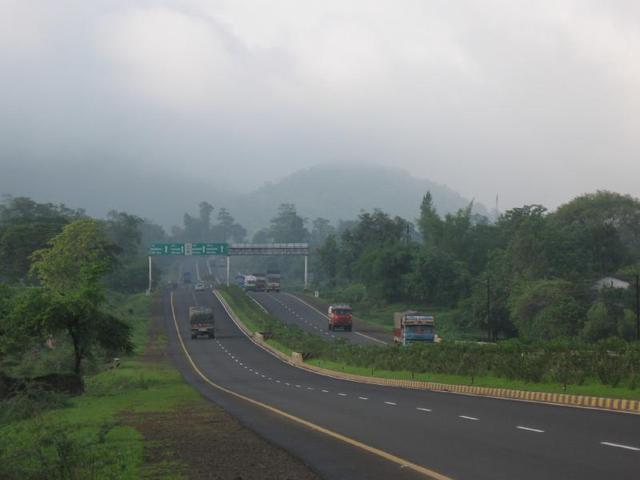
National Highway 44 (India), the longest highway in India

In India, highway refers to one of the many National Highways and State Highways that run up to a total length of over 300,000 km (190,000 mi) consisting mostly of two-lane paved roads, changing into higher lanes mostly around cities. National Highways are designated NH followed by a number. As of 2009, the major cities in India – Ahmedabad, Pune, Jaipur, Bengaluru, Hyderabad, Nagpur, Visakhapatnam, Mumbai, Chennai, Kolkata, and Delhi – are connected by the Golden Quadrilateral or North–South and East–West Corridor, consisting of four- to six-lane roads. Other major cities are connected to it by the National Highways.

An expressway refers to any access-controlled road with grade-separated intersections and make up a very small portion of India's highway network, at about 5,579 km (3,467 mi) length. Expressways are separate from the highway network, except for the Delhi–Gurgaon Expressway, which is part of NH 8.The longest expressway in India is the Mumbai–Nagpur Expressway (Phase-II) at 600 km (370 mi).

=== Indonesia ===
The Indonesian national route system exists solely on Java. The tolled expressways built parallel to the national route, for example, the Jakarta-Merak Toll Road that parallels National Highway 1 from Merak Harbour to Jakarta. Urban expressways are also built, for example Jakarta's Inner and Outer ring roads. The main cities in Java are also well-connected by the toll road network, including Cipularang Toll Road in West Java connecting Jakarta and Bandung and the Trans-Java Toll Road that connects Jakarta and Surabaya. It also connects to Cirebon (Cikopo–Palimanan Toll Road), Semarang (Batang-Semarang Toll Road), Surakarta (Semarang-Solo Toll Road) and several towns on both Central and East Java, especially the North Coast in Central Java.

There is a plan to connect Lampung to Aceh in Sumatra Island through the Trans-Sumatra Toll Road network. Also, Balikpapan and Samarinda in East Kalimantan have been connected by the toll road in 2019.

=== Iran ===
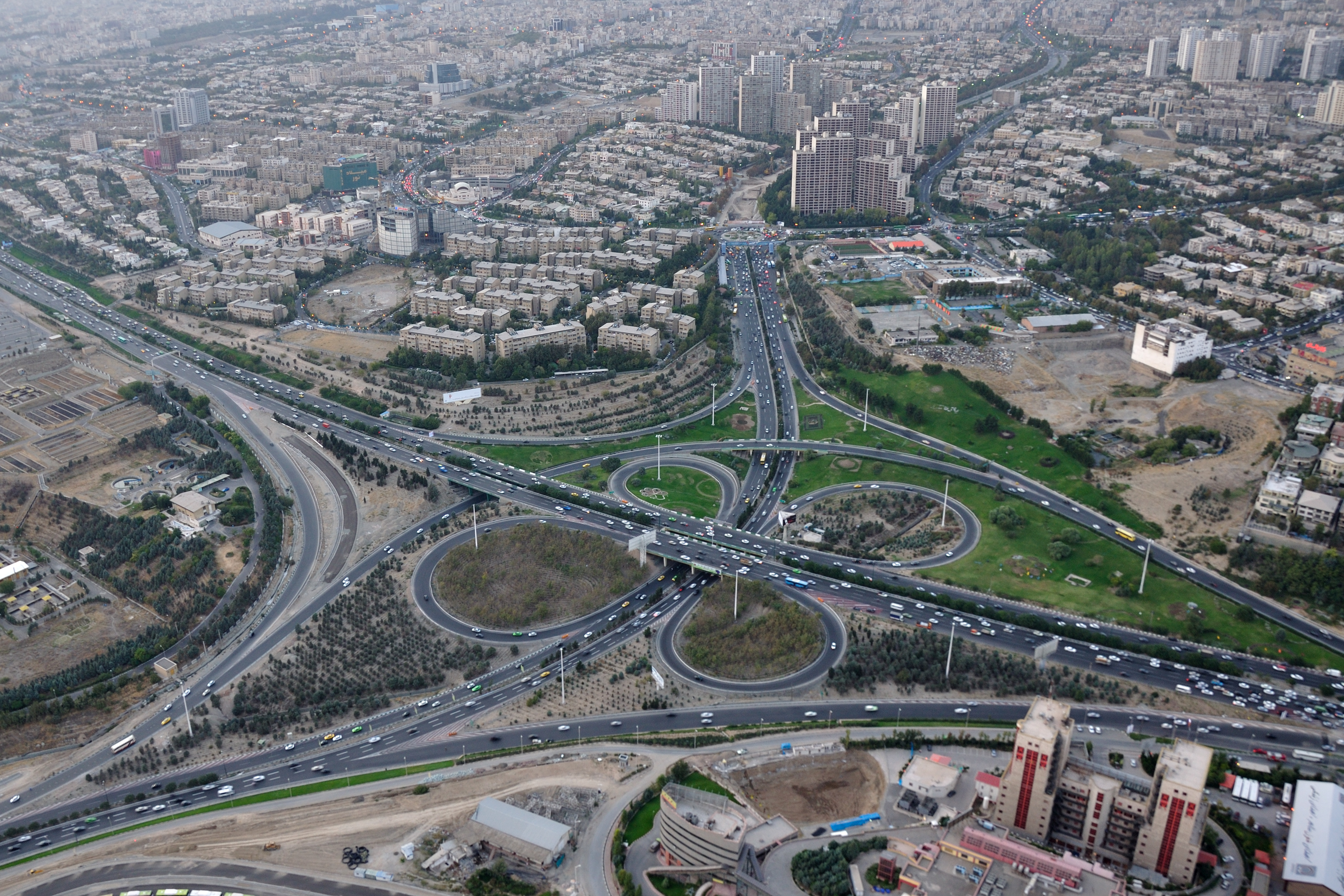
Hemmat Expressway in Tehran

In Iran the term highway, commonly known as autobahn (Persian: اتوبان/بزرگراه), is applied to roads constructed with particular standards. The conventional speed limit of 120 km/h (75 mph) is in place for most highways. There are two types of highway in Iran:

1. Inner-city highways, which can be found in larger cities such as Tehran. Their main purpose is to prevent congestion and pass traffic through cities.
2. Intra-city highways, which connect different parts of the country together.

=== Japan ===
The expressways, or kōsokudōro (high-speed roads), of Japan consist of a huge network of freeway-standard toll roads. Once government-owned, they have been turned over to private companies. Most expressways are four lanes with a central reservation, or median. The speed limits, with certain regulations and great flexibility, usually include a maximum speed of 100 km/h (62 mph), and a minimum speed of 50 km/h (31 mph).

=== Malaysia ===
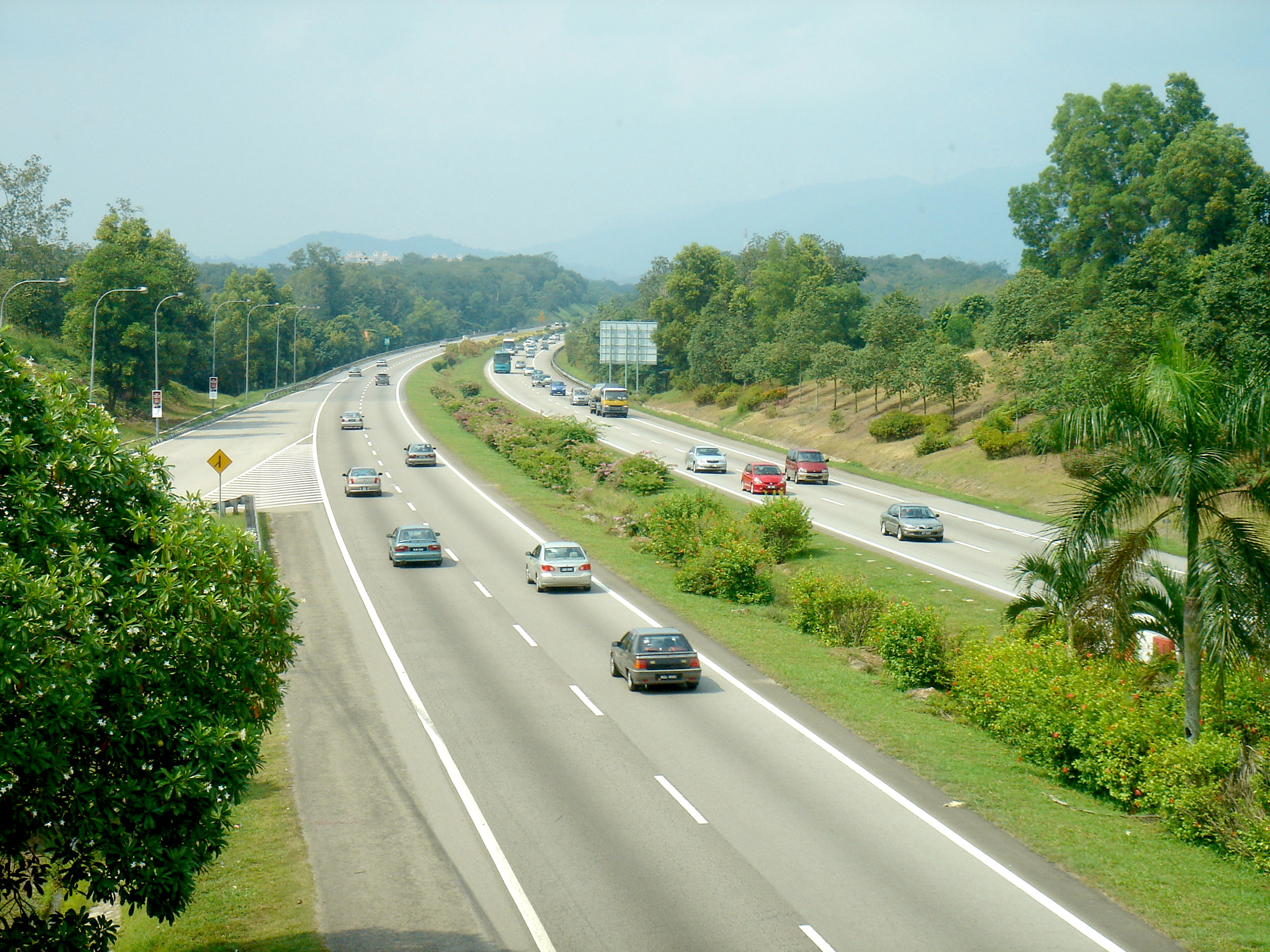
South section of North–South Expressway in Malaysia, facing towards Kuala Lumpur

The highest level of major roads in Malaysia, expressway (lebuhraya), has full access control, grade-separated junctions, and is mostly tolled. The expressways link the major state capitals in Peninsular Malaysia and major cities in Klang Valley.

Highways are a lower level with limited access control, some at-grade junctions or roundabouts, and generally with two lanes in each separated direction. These are generally untolled and funded by the federal government; hence the first one is called Federal Highway linking Klang and Kuala Lumpur.

The trunk roads linking major cities and towns in the country are called federal trunk roads, and are generally two-lane single carriageway roads, in places with a third climbing lane for slow lorries.

=== Pakistan ===
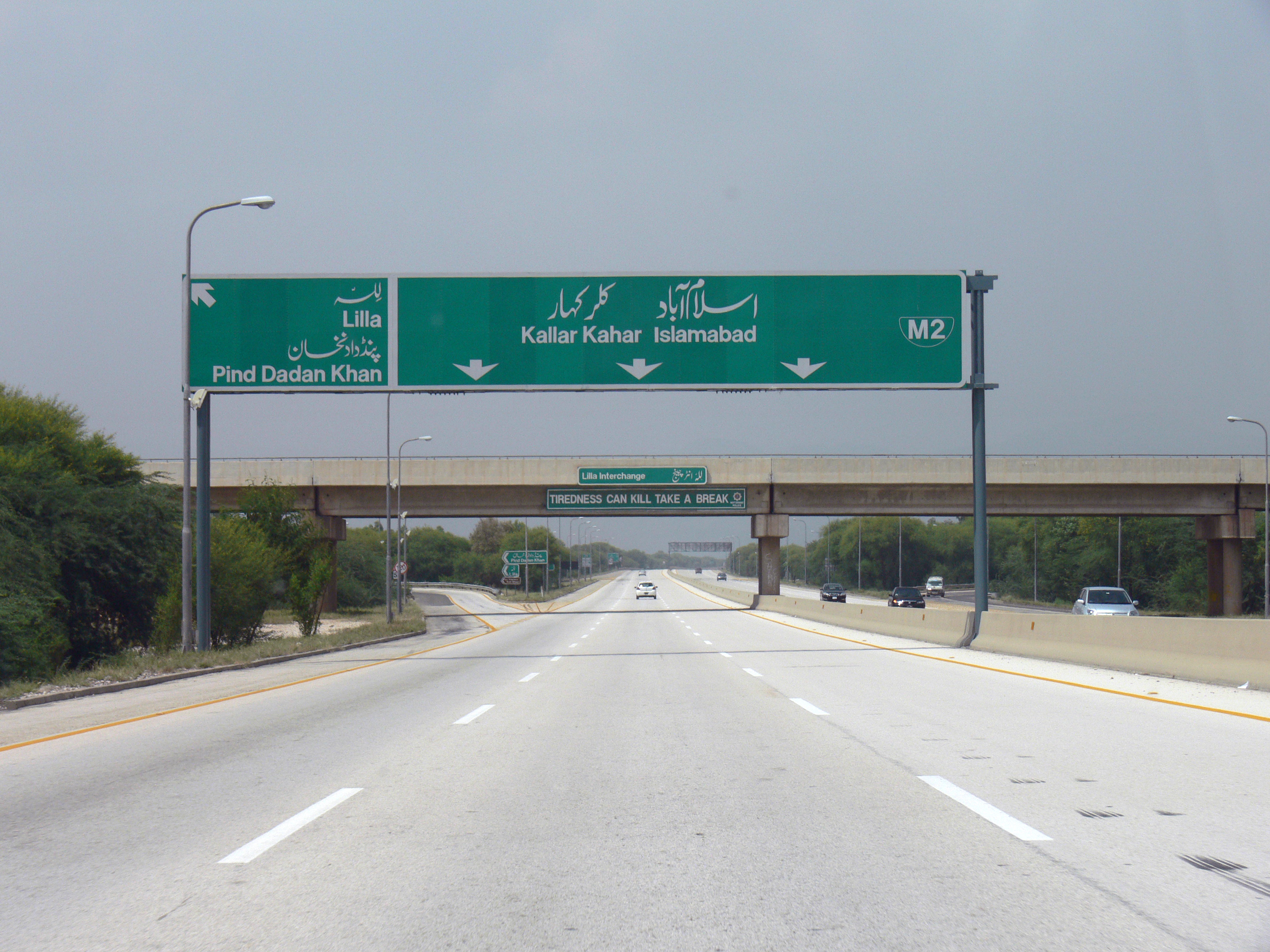
M2-1

Pakistan has its own network of highways and motorways. Motorways extending from M1 to M11 will eventually connect the whole length of the country from Peshawar to Karachi. The M2, the first motorway, was built in 1997 with the contract being awarded to the Korean firm Daewoo. It linked the federal capital Islamabad with Punjab's provincial capital Lahore. The network was then extended to Faisalabad and then to Multan with the M4. The M1 highway to the capital of Khyber Pakhtunkhwa, Peshawar, was completed in October 2007. M4, M5, M6, and M7 have been planned and are also being built by local and foreign firms. They will connect Faisalabad, Multan, Dera Ghazi Khan, and Rotadero (Larkana) to Karachi. N5 links Karachi to other cities. Entry on all Pakistani highways is restricted to fast-moving wheelers only. Slow-moving traffic and two-wheelers (such as motorcycles and bicycles) are not allowed and construction and agricultural machinery is also restricted. M9 and M10 are also functional, connecting Karachi to Hayderabad. The LSM (Lahore Sialkot Motorway), which is 103 km (64 mi), is called M-11. Expressways are similar to motorways with fewer access restrictions and are owned, maintained and operated either federally or provincially.

=== Saudi Arabia ===
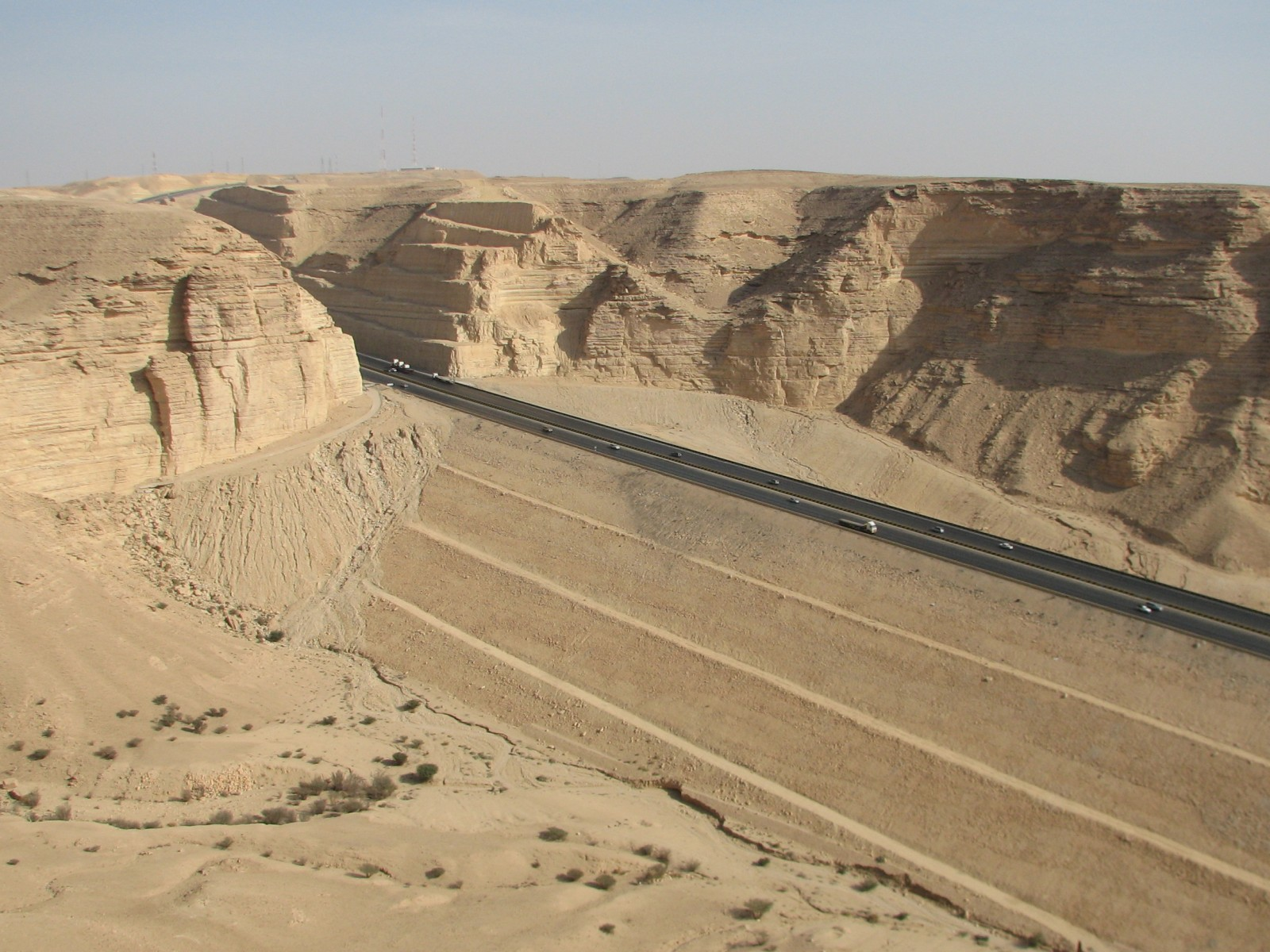
Riyadh–Makkah Highway, Saudi Arabia

Saudi Arabia has a total highway length of 73,000 km (45,000 mi). Highways in Saudi Arabia vary from ten-laned roads to small four-laned roads. The city highways, such as the roads in Riyadh, and other major highways are well-maintained. The roads are constructed so they resist the summer's extremely high heat and do not reflect the strong sun.

Some of the important inter-city highways include:

- Dammam–Khafji Highway (457 120 km/h (75 mph))
- Jeddah–Makkah Highway (75 120 km/h (75 mph))
- Makkah–Madinah Al Munawarah Highway (421 120 km/h (75 mph))
- Riyadh–Gomfida Highway (395 140 km/h (87 mph))
- Riyadh–Qasim Highway (317 140 km/h (87 mph))
- Riyadh–Taif Highway (950 140 km/h (87 mph))
- Taif–Abha Highway (950 110 km/h (68 mph))

=== Singapore ===
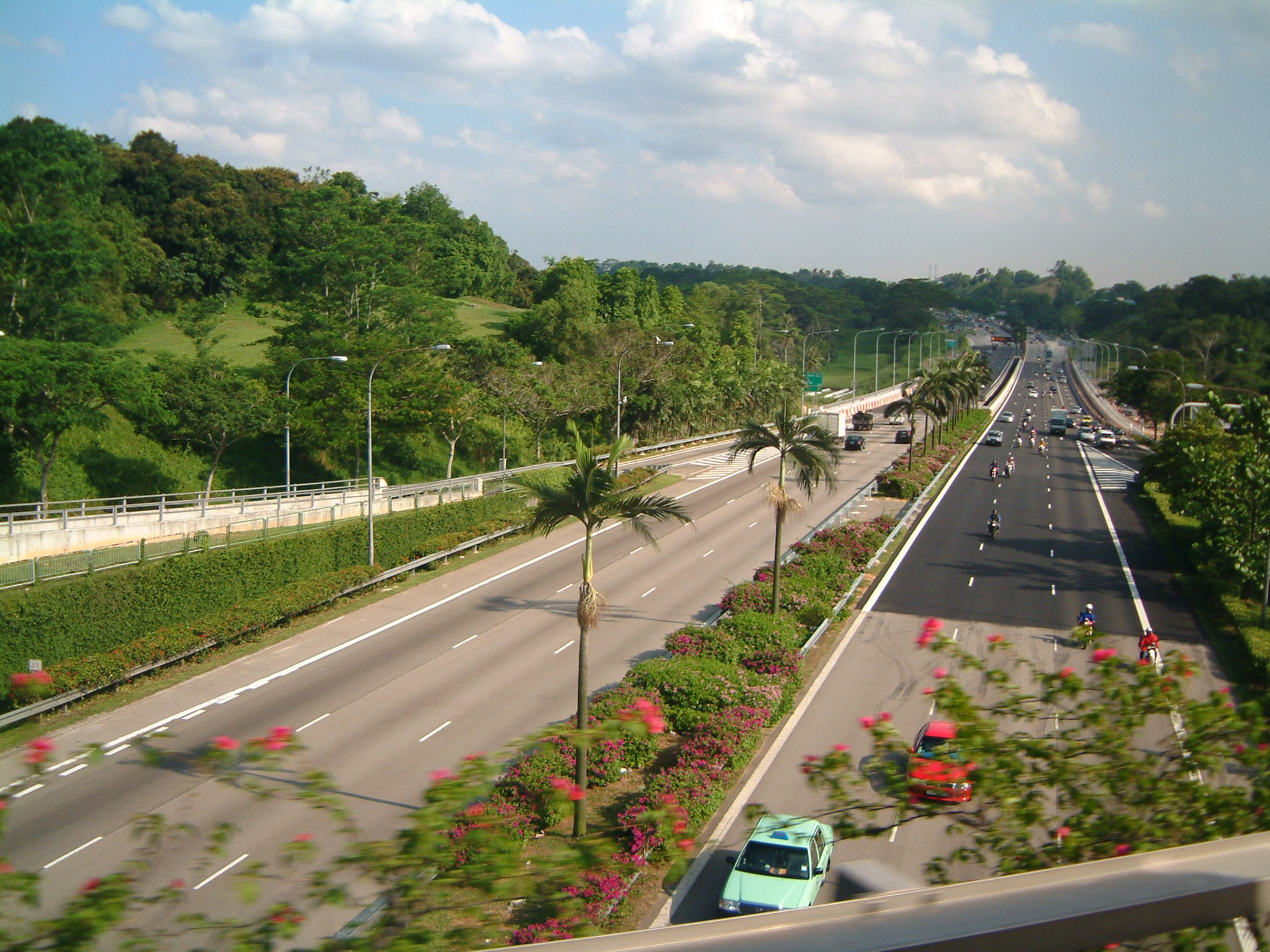
The Bukit Timah Expressway in Singapore

The expressways of Singapore are all dual carriageways with grade-separated access. They usually have three lanes in each direction, although there are two- or five-lane carriageways in some places. There are nine expressways, with the newest one, the Marina Coastal Expressway, constructed with modern technology under the water.

Construction on the first expressway, the Pan Island Expressway, started in 1966. The other expressways were completed in stages, with the first phase of the Kallang-Paya Lebar Expressway being the most recently completed, in 2007. Today, there are 164 km (102 mi) of expressways in Singapore.

=== South Korea ===
Expressways in South Korea were originally numbered in order of construction. Since August 24, 2001, they have been numbered in a scheme somewhat similar to that of the Interstate Highway System in the United States:

- Arterial routes are designated by two-digit route numbers, with north–south routes having odd numbers, and east–west routes having even numbers. Primary routes (i.e. major thoroughfares) have five and zero as their last digits respectively, while lesser (secondary) routes have various final digits.
- Branch routes have three-digit route numbers, where the first two digits match the route number of an arterial route.
- Belt lines have three-digit route numbers where the first digit matches the respective city's postal code.
- Route numbers in the range 70–99 are not used in South Korea and are reserved for designations in the event of Korean reunification.
- The Gyeongbu Expressway kept its Route 1 designation, as it is South Korea's first and most important expressway.

=== Sri Lanka ===
Southern Expressway (E01) is the first expressway in Sri Lanka. It runs from Kottawa (township in Suburban Colombo) to Matara (126 km (78 mi)) and the construction of the section from Kottawa to Pinnaduwa (Galle) was completed as a dual expressway with four lanes and declared open in November 2011. Galle Port access road has been built to connect Galle city to Pinnaduwa interchange. The designed speed of the expressway is 120 km/h (75 mph). The operational speed of the expressway is 100 km/h (62 mph). The Southern Expressway will be extended up to Hambantota connecting Mattala Rajapaksa International Airport and the Magampura Mahinda Rajapaksa Port.

The second expressway to be declared open in Sri Lanka was the Colombo–Katunayake Expressway (E03) that was opened to the public in October 2013, which also connects Sri Lanka's premier international airport, Bandaranaike International Airport, with capital Colombo.

Colombo Outer Circular Expressway (E02), designed to link the major expressways connected to Sri Lanka's commercial hub, Colombo,by bypassing the traffic within the city limits.

=== Taiwan ===
The construction of Taiwan's national highways began in 1971 and the design is heavily based on the American Interstate Highway System. The northern section between Keelung City and Zhongli City (now Zhongli District, Taoyuan) was completed in 1974. The construction of the first freeway (No. 1) was completed in 1978. The freeway runs from the northern port city of Keelung to the southern port city of Kaohsiung. There was an 8.6 km (5.3 mi) branch (No. 1A) connecting the Taiwan Taoyuan International Airport.

Construction on the other freeways began in the late 1980s. The north section of the second north–south freeway (No. 3) between Xizhi City and Hsinchu City was completed in 1997. The No. 1A Branch was extended to link No. 3 Freeway at Yingge, and renamed as No. 2 Freeway. Three other short freeways (No. 4, No. 8, and No. 10) were built to link the two north–south freeways in Taichung County (now part of Taichung City), Tainan County (now part of Tainan City), and Kaohsiung County (now part of Kaohsiung City), respectively. The entire No. 3 Freeway was completed in January, 2004.

To ease the congestion of No. 1 Freeway in the Taipei metropolitan area, a 20 km (12 mi) elevated bridge was built in 1997 on top of the original freeway between Xizhi City and Wugu, to serve as a bypass for traffic not exiting/entering the freeway within the city limits of Taipei.

The construction of a freeway connecting the Taipei metropolitan area and Yilan County began in 1991 and was completed in June 2006. It includes a 12.9 km (8.0 mi) tunnel (Hsuehshan Tunnel), which is the fifth-longest road tunnel in the world. An extension from Yilan County to Hualien County is planned. However, its construction is being delayed due to environmental concerns.

=== Thailand ===
Motorways (Thai: ทางหลวงพิเศษ, RTGS: thang luang phiset) in Thailand make up an intercity toll controlled-access highway network that currently spans 145 km (90 mi). It is to be greatly extended to 4,155 km (2,582 mi) according to the master plan. Thailand's motorway network is considered to be separate from Thailand's expressway network, which is the system of expressways, usually elevated, within Greater Bangkok. Thailand also has a provincial highway network.

=== Turkey ===
Turkey's main highway is E80 (formerly E5), which runs from Edirne to the capital Ankara. Turkey's highways now run non-stop between Edirne and Şanlıurfa.

=== Yemen ===
Yemen has one of the oldest highway routes in the region. The first highway route was between Aden and Hadromout, with a two-lane highway. Currently, Yemen has 71,300 km (44,300 mi) of roads, of which only 6,200 km (3,900 mi) are paved.

== Europe ==
=== Albania ===
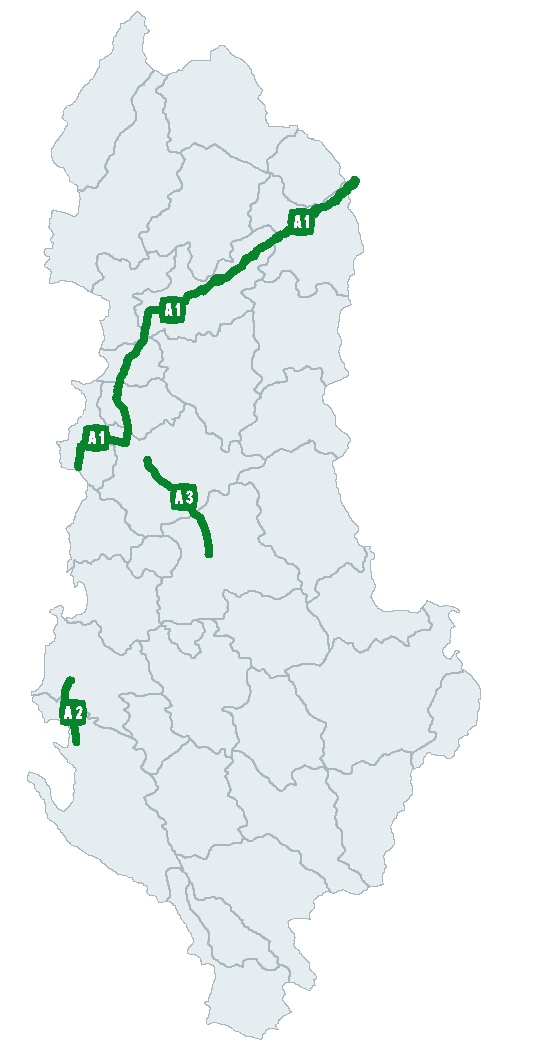
Map of Albanian motorways as of 2014

In Albania, major cities are linked with either new single/dual carriageways or well maintained state roads marked as "SH" (Rrugë Shtetërore).

There is a dual carriageway connecting the port city of Durrës with Tirana, Vlorë, and partially Kukës.

There are three official motorway segments in Albania marked with an "A" (Autostradë):

Thumanë–Milot–Rrëshen–Kalimash (A1),

Levan–Vlorë (A2),

and partly Tirane–Elbasan (A3).

Most rural segments continue to remain in poor condition as their reconstruction has only begun in the late 2000s by the Albanian Development Fund.

=== Austria ===
In contrast to Germany, according to a 2002 amendment of the Austrian federal road act, Bundesstraßen is the official term referring only to autobahns (Bundesstraßen A) and limited-access roads (Schnellstraßen, Bundesstraßen S). The administration of all other former federal highways (Bundesstraßen B) has passed to the federal states (Bundesländer).

Therefore, while officially classified as Landesstraßen, they are still colloquially called Bundesstraßen and have retained their 'B' designation (except for Vorarlberg), followed by the number and a name. They are marked by a blue number sign.

=== Belgium ===
Belgium has the second-highest density highway network in Europe after the Netherlands, at 54.7 km (34.0 mi) per 1,000 km^{2} (390 sq mi). Belgium is situated at a crossroads of several countries, and its highways are used by many nationalities. Belgian highways are indicated by the letter "A" and a European number, with E numbers being used most often. Roads that are (part of) a ring road around a city or a town are usually indicated by an R number. Many of the highways in Belgium were illuminated at night, since there was a surplus of nuclear-powered electricity during off-peak hours.

=== Bosnia and Herzegovina ===
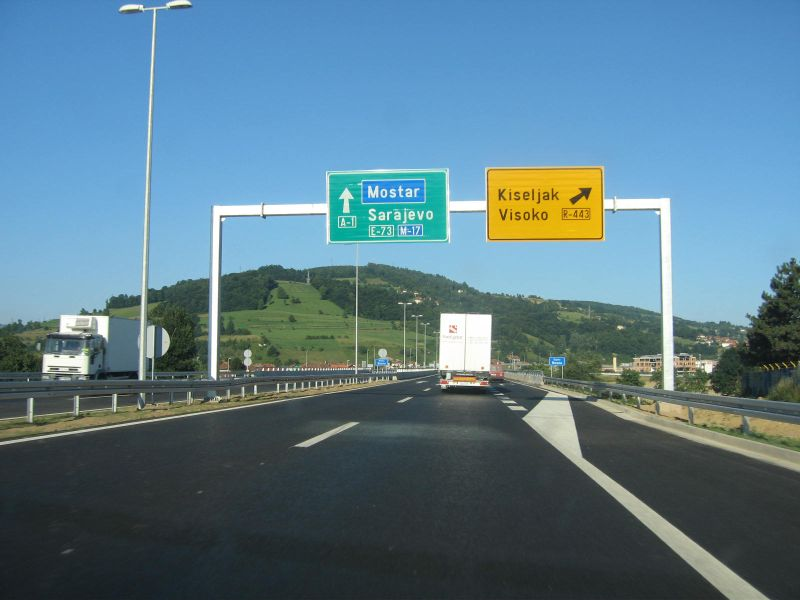
Motorway on corridor Vc between Sarajevo and Visoko, Bosnia and Herzegovina

As for Bosnia and Herzegovina, the Pan-European Corridor Vc Motorway, Budapest–Osijek–Sarajevo–Ploče, is one of the most significant projects; in Bosnia and Herzegovina, it coincides with the A1 Motorway. The construction works on the road have already begun, but intensified beginning of the construction will be a key starter of economic and social activities, and will enable Bosnia and Herzegovina to be connected to main the European traffic network, as well as to global European economic and social structure.

Construction of the motorway, which has a total length of 340 km (210 mi), will provide connections to neighboring countries and regions, have effects on stabilization and development, improvements in transport conditions and quality of life, improvements in economic competitiveness, launching of new projects and enhancement of private investments nationally and internationally.

=== Bulgaria ===
The strategic location of the country on the Balkan Peninsula is decisive for the fact that four out of ten land Pan-European corridors run through it, and ten European routes – six A-class and four B-class routes.

Highways in Bulgaria are dual carriageways, grade separated with controlled-access, designed for high speeds. In 2012 legislation amendments defined two types of highways: motorways and expressways. The main differences are that motorways have emergency lanes and the maximum allowed speed limit is 140 km/h (87 mph), while expressways do not and the speed limit is 120 km/h (75 mph).

As of December 2018, 801 km (498 mi) of motorways are in service, with another 38 km (24 mi) being under various stages of construction. More than 500 km (311 mi) of motorways are planned. Also, several expressways are planned.

=== Croatia ===
Croatia has several highways and expressways. The first motorway in Croatia, the Orehovica–Kikovica section near Rijeka, opened in 1971. The Croatian term autocesta is generally translated as "motorway" or "highway" and refers to a controlled-access road comparable to an Autobahn. Most Croatian motorways are toll roads. As of 2023, there were approximately 1341 km of highways in Croatia.

=== Czechia ===
Czechia has 17 motorways. The construction of the earliest Czech highway (D1) between Prague and Brno was initiated in 1939, but was twice interrupted and reached Brno only in 1980. The word highway is a common Czech translation of the term dálnice, which describes a toll highway similar to a freeway or an Autobahn.

=== Denmark ===
With the completion of the extremely long highway bridge tunnels of the Great Belt Fixed Link in 1998 and Øresund Bridge in 2000, continental Europe was finally connected by road and rail with capital city Copenhagen and Sweden. This includes the Swedish highway and railroad system. The bridge tunnels are all interconnected with major Danish highways and complete a continuous international road connection from northern Sweden to Gibraltar at the southern edge of Spain and Messina, Italy, at the southern tip of the Italian "boot".

The 18 km (11 mi) Fehmarn Belt Fixed Link has commenced construction in 2021, planning to link Zealand (with Copenhagen) to northern Germany by 2029”.

=== Finland ===
The national highways in Finland are numbered 1–29 and are in total 9,000 km (5,600 mi) long. The numbering system originated in 1938. There are motorways for 881 km (547 mi) around the largest cities, especially in the south near the capital of Helsinki. Highways numbered 1–6 are the main connection roads in Finland.

=== France ===
France has a national highway system dating back to Louis XV (see Corps of Ponts et Chaussées). The chaussées constructed at this time, radiating out from Paris, form the basis for the routes nationales (RN), whose red numbers differ from the yellow numbering used for secondary routes départementales. The RNs numbered from 1 to 20 radiate from Paris to major ports or border crossings. More recently, after the Second World War, France has constructed Autoroutes, ex. A6-A7, which is called Autoroute du Soleil, superhighways (usually toll roads) with a speed limit of 130 km/h (81 mph) (110 km/h (68 mph) in rainy conditions or urban areas). Those autoroutes made some parts of the routes nationales (RN) secondary (routes départementales).

=== Germany ===
Aside from highways bearing the designation Autobahn, Germany has many two- and four-lane roads. Federal highways not known as Autobahnen are called Bundesstraßen (Bundesstrassen) and, while usually two-lane roads, they may also be four-lane, limited-access expressways of local or regional importance. Unlike the Autobahnen, though, Bundesstraßen (marked by black numbers on a yellow background) mostly have speed limits (usually 100 km/h (62 mph), but occasionally higher on limited-access segments, and lower in urban areas or near intersections).

=== Hungary ===
Hungary has seven major motorways (autópálya):

- M0 is a quasi-circular highway for the traffic bypassing Budapest. It is divided in four sectors: Southern (links motorways M1, M7, M6 and M5), South-eastern (links Motorway M5 and Main Road no. 4), Eastern (links Main Road no. 4 and Motorway M3), Northern (links Main Road no. 2 with the Megyeri Bridge) and Western (to be finished in 2015; will link main roads 11, 11 and Motorway M1). The total length will be around 100 km (62 mi).
- M1: links Budapest and the north-western border with Austria (Hegyeshalom), then continues its way toward Vienna. The total length is around 170 km (110 mi).
- M3: links Budapest and the north-eastern city of Miskolc (M30 branch), and the eastern cities of Nyíregyháza (M3) and Debrecen (M35 branch). It provides links toward Slovakia, Ukraine and Romania. It has a total length of around 250 km (160 mi).
- M5: links Budapest and the southern city of Szeged, then the Serbian border (Röszke). It provides a connection to Southern Europe by route E75 and also links to route 68 in Romania. M5 motorway has a length of around 140 km (87 mi).
- M7: links Budapest and the southern shore of Lake Balaton, then continues its way toward Croatia and Slovenia. Its length is about 230 km (140 mi)
- M6: links Budapest and Dunaújváros, now extended to the southern city of Pécs. The original length was around 60 km (37 mi).

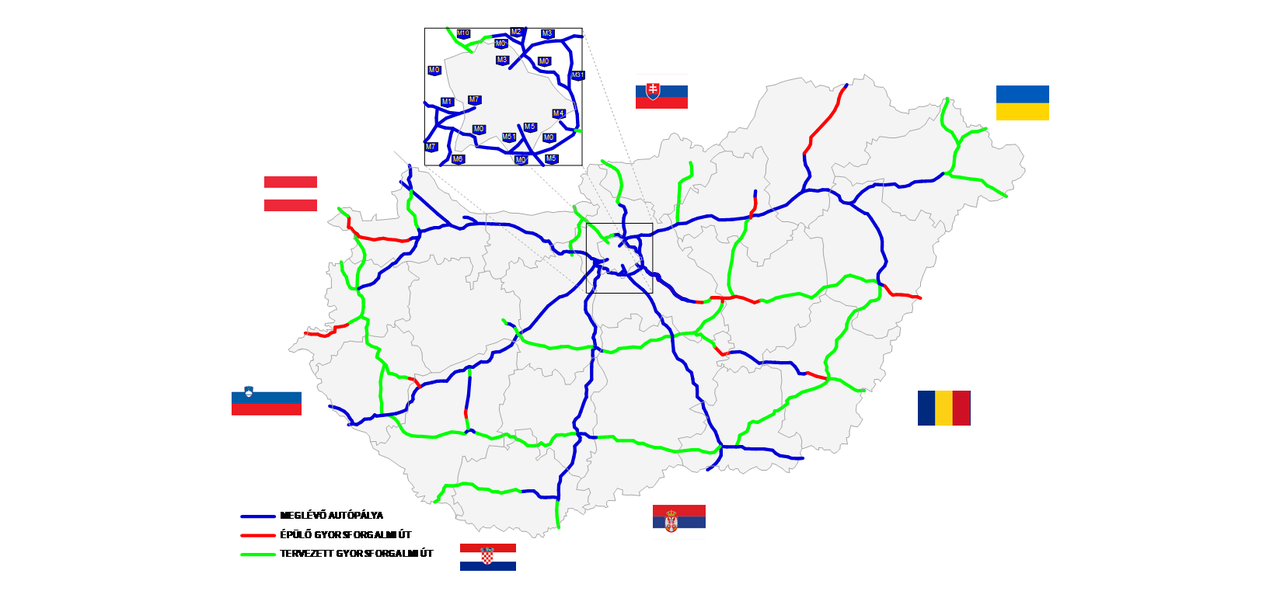
Highways in Hungary

Also, there are other smaller motorway sections that will be linked to the national motorway network in the future. Motorways usually have two traffic lanes and an emergency lane in each direction, divided by a green zone and metallic rail. The speed limit is 130 km/h (81 mph).

Expressways usually have no dividing lane in the middle, but sometimes have a metallic rail. The number of lanes is one per direction, with sections of 1+2 lanes (for easier overtaking). The speed limit is 110 km/h (68 mph). Motorways and expressways cannot be used by vehicles that are not able to reach 60 km/h (37 mph). There is a toll on all motorways, except M0. Trucks and buses have a separate toll system.

Those who wish to travel on these roads have to buy a sticker.

Main roads usually have one lane per direction, no dividing rail. The speed limit is 110 km/h (68 mph).

County roads have less traffic than main roads; the speed limit is 90 km/h (56 mph).

=== Ireland ===
Ireland has the sixth-densest motorway network in Europe. There are National primary roads ('N' roads) and Regional roads ('R' roads). The maximum speed is 120 km/h (75 mph) on motorways. The main Inter Urban route Motorways connecting Dublin by motorway to the cities of Cork, Limerick, Waterford and Galway, as well as other projects, have increased the total motorway network in the state to approximately 1,017 km (632 mi).

=== Italy ===
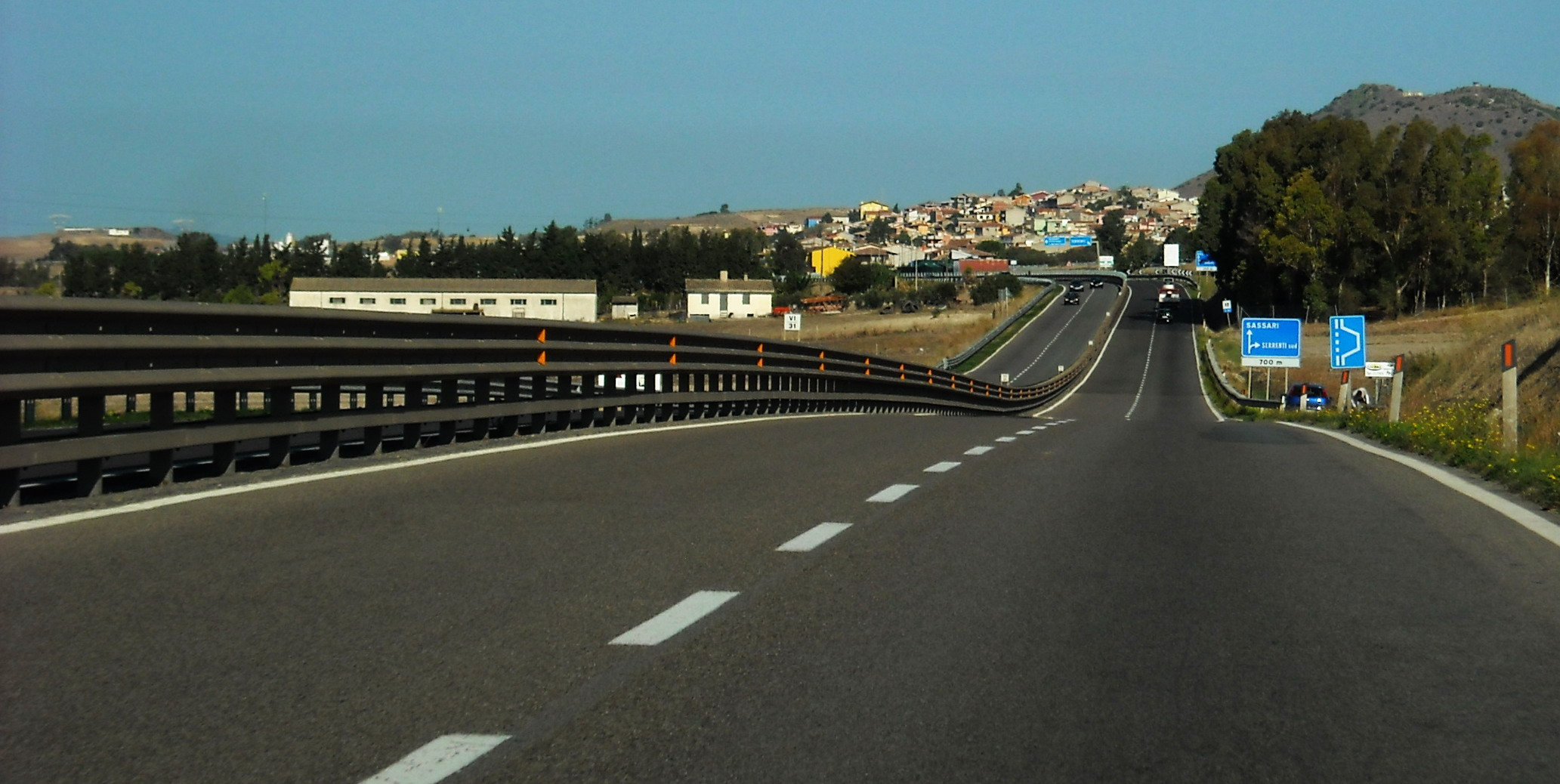
The superstrada Cagliari-Porto Torres (Strada statale 131 Carlo Felice), the main road artery of Sardinia

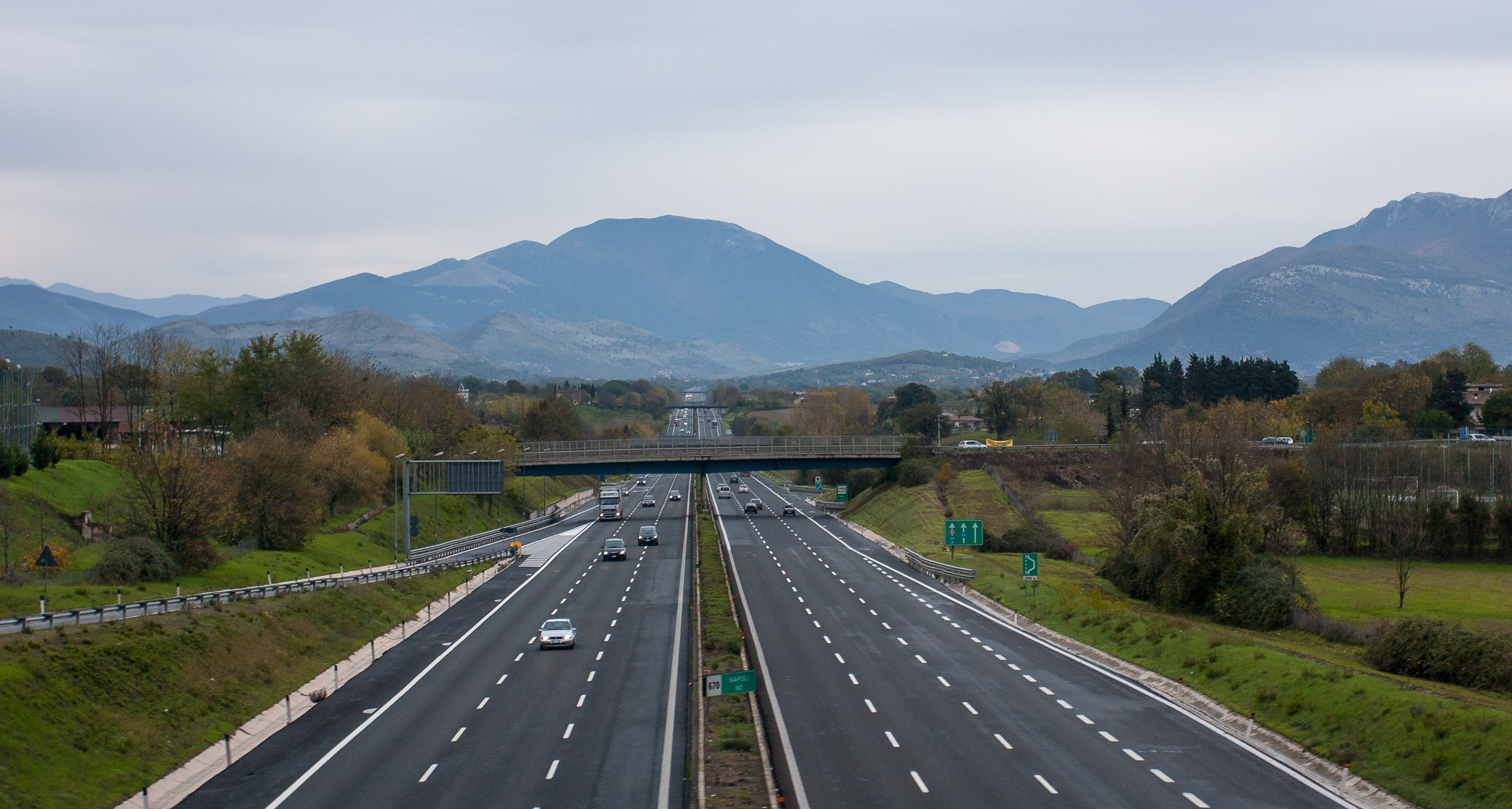
Autostrada A1 (E35/E45) runs through Italy linking some of the largest cities of the country: Milan, Bologna, Florence, Rome and Naples

Roads in Italy are an important mode of transport in Italy. In Italy the term highway can be applied to superstrada (can be translated as expressway; it is toll-free) and autostrada (Italian term for motorway: the majority of the system has a mandatory toll). A superstrada ("super road") is a fast road, often with separate carriageways in each direction, reserved for the circulation of motor vehicles and without at-grade intersections and urban crossings. The colloquial classification of superstrada refers to all roads classified technically as main extra-urban roads and, in general, to secondary two-lane extra-urban roads.

Italy was the first country in the world to build motorways, the so-called autostrade, reserved for fast traffic and for motor vehicles only. The Autostrada dei Laghi ("Lakes Motorway"), the first built in the world, connecting Milan to Lake Como and Lake Maggiore, and now parts of the Autostrada A8 and the Autostrada A9, was devised by Piero Puricelli and was inaugurated in 1924. This system of early motorways was extended between the early 1930s and early 1970s. Nowadays the Autostrade is a comprehensive system of about 7,016 km (4,360 mi) of modern motorways with a maximum speed limit of 130 km/h (81 mph).

In particular, 1,870.2 km (1,162.1 mi) of the Italian motorway network have three lanes per carriageway, 129 km (80 mi) km have four lanes per carriageway, 1.8 km (1.1 mi) have five lanes per carriageway, while the remaining part is two lanes per carriageway. The density is 22.4 km (13.9 mi) of motorway for every 1,000 km^{2} (390 sq mi) of Italian territory. In order for a road to be classified as an autostrada, various geometric and construction conditions must be satisfied and these, although very similar in basis (for example the width of the travel lanes must be 3.75 m (12.3 ft)) are not constant: there are different technical-legal regulations for motorways built in urban or extra-urban areas.

=== Netherlands ===
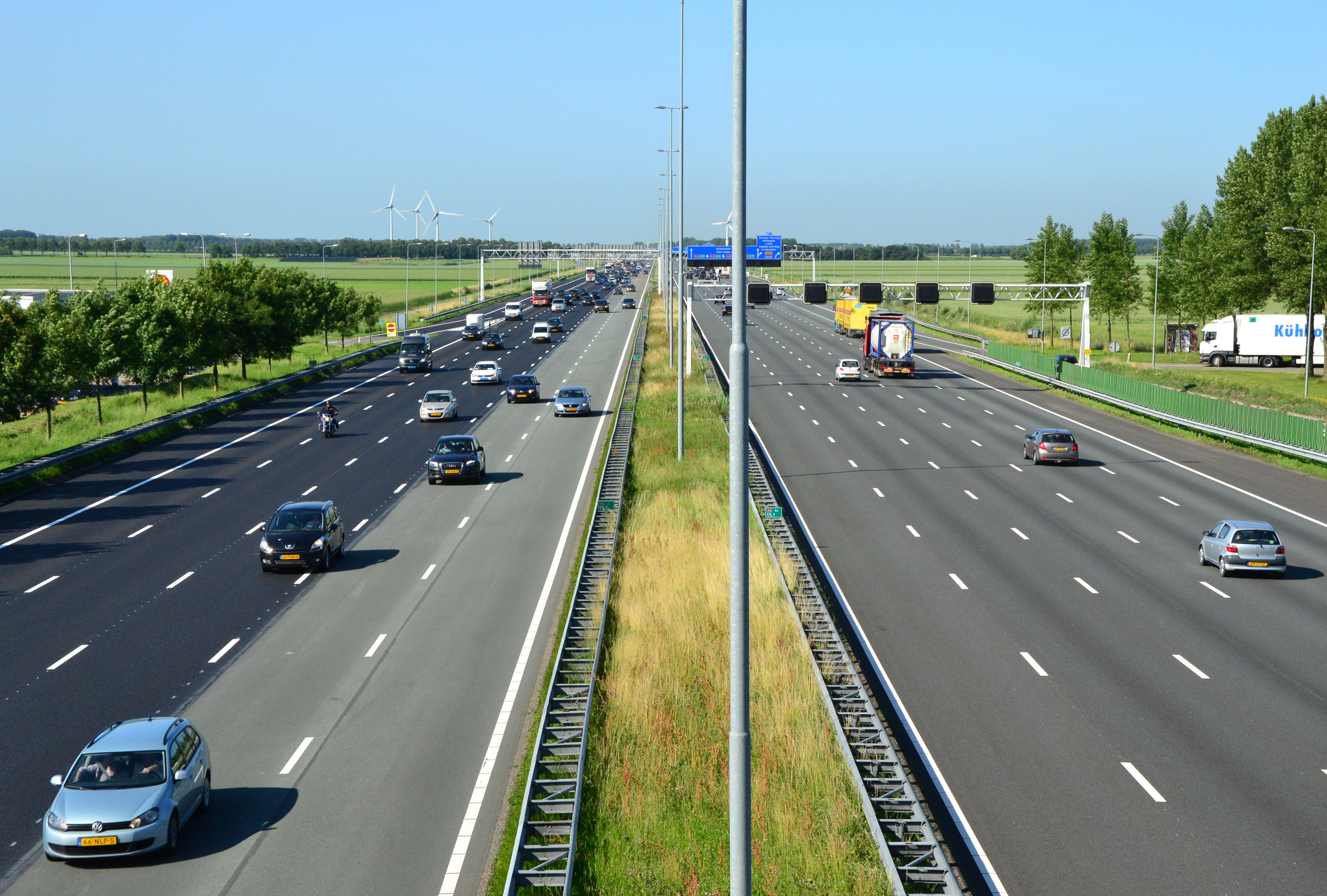
The A4 motorway near Hoofddorp

The Autosnelweg system is in constant development. Most of its parts are owned and funded by the government, but in recent times Public-private partnership come more and more into practice, such as in a part of the A59 between Oss and 's-Hertogenbosch. The Netherlands has the highest density highway network of Europe at 56.5 km (35.1 mi) per 1,000 km^{2} (390 sq mi), followed by Belgium. The Autosnelwegen, the main corridors, are designated with an A while secondary connecting roads have an N number. Sections of the A network are also part of the International E-road network connecting with neighboring Belgium, Germany and England, the latter by ferry. The speed limit is 100 km/h (62 mph) from 6.00AM until 7PM unless noted otherwise, and 120 km/h (75 mph), 100 km/h (62 mph) during the day, or 80 km/h (50 mph) in various locations. This is done to reduce exhaust emissions and to limit noise in surrounding residential areas.

=== North Macedonia ===
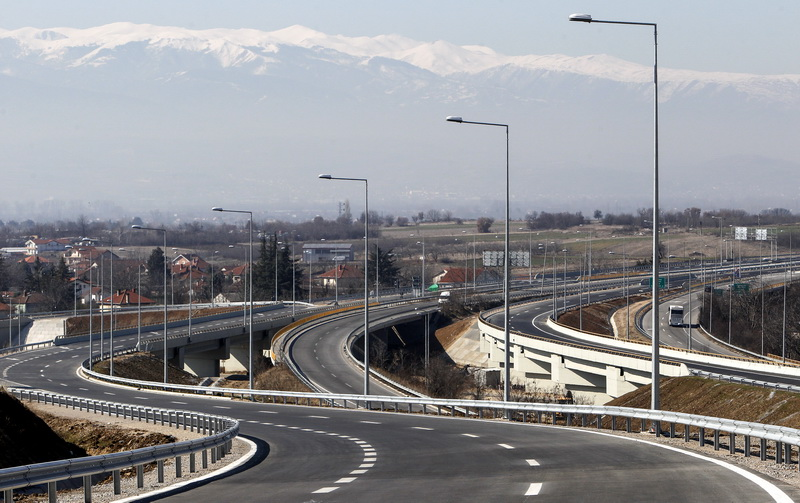
A1/A2/A4 Interchange at Miladinovci, North Macedonia

The total length of Macedonian motorways as of spring 2021 is 317 km (197 mi), with another 70 km (43 mi) under construction (57 km (35 mi) from Kicevo to Ohrid and 13 km (8.1 mi) from Skopje Ring Road to the border with Kosovo). An additional 60 km (37 mi) are planned to begin construction in 2022.

The three motorway sections are A1 (part of E-75), which connects the northern (Serbia) to the southern border (Greece); A2 (part of E-65) connects Skopje, Tetovo and Gostivar (Kicevo and Ohrid by 2023); A3 connects Skopje to the eastern town of Stip.

=== Norway ===
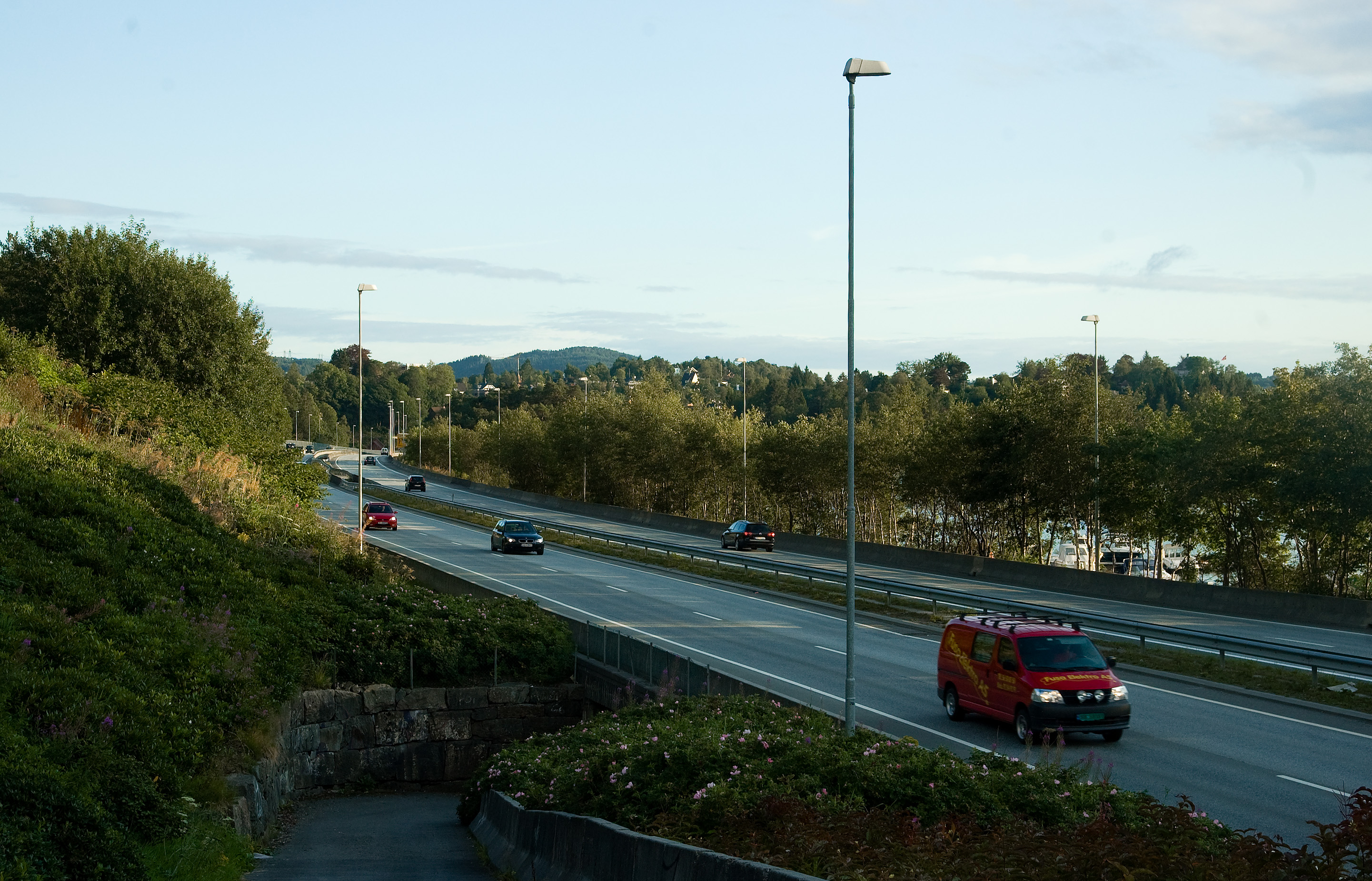
Motorvei in Bergen, Norway

Norway has a national highway system, numbered 2–899. Some main highways are also European highways and have an E before the number. The highways are often relatively narrow and curvy. Near the larger cities, especially around Oslo and Trondheim, there are motorways. Norway has also been engaged in recent decades in drilling extremely long highway tunnels through the mountain ranges, and some of these, now the world's longest, are so long that they have hollowed-out caverns in the midst of them for motorists to stop and take rests.

=== Poland ===
Polish public roads are grouped into categories related to administrative division. Poland has 383,313 km (238,180 mi) of public roads, of which 122,080 km (75,860 mi) are unpaved (2008):

- National roads: 18,520 km (11,510 mi)
- Voivodeship roads: 28,536 km (17,730 mi), 61.4 km (38 mi) unpaved
- Powiat roads: 126,924 km (78,870 mi), 12,539 km (7,790 mi) unpaved
- Gmina roads: 209,333 km (130,070 mi), 109,478 km (68,030 mi) unpaved

Polish motorways and expressways are part of the national road network.

=== Romania ===
Romania currently has eight operational highways, adding up to 982 km (610 mi); they are being extended and additionally, other motorways are planned to be built by 2030.

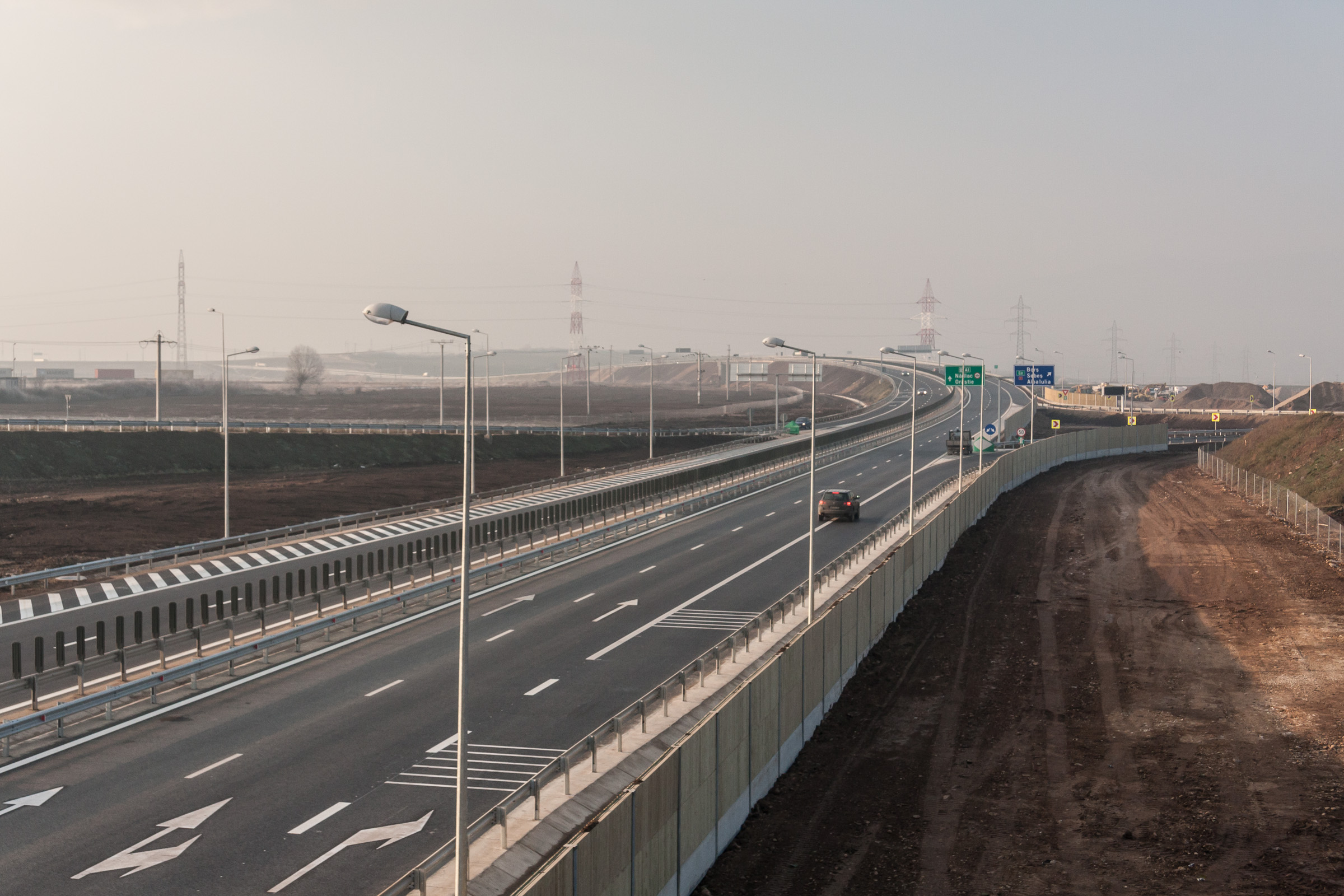
A1 motorway Sebeș – Orăștie segment, Romania

The orange highways will run next to the green European roads

- A0: Bucharest Ring Motorway: 75 km (47 mi) of 100 km (62 mi) under construction (A2 – Jilava – DN6 – A1, DN1: Corbeanca – DN2: Afumați, DN3: Cernica – A2); estimated completion in 2024;
- A1: Bucharest-Nădlac highway: 443.7 km (275.7 mi) of 580.2 km (360.5 mi) built (Bucharest-Pitești, Pitești Bypass, Sibiu Bypass, Sibiu-Coşevița, Margina-Nădlac); 44.5 km (27.7 mi) under construction (Pitești – Curtea de Argeș, Boița – Sibiu); estimated completion in 2026–2027
- A2: Autostrada Soarelui (Highway of the Sun): all 202.7 km (126.0 mi) built (Bucharest-Cernavodă-Constanța);
- A3: Autostrada Transilvania (Transylvania highway): 171 km (106 mi) of 596 km (370 mi) built (București – Ploiești, Râșnov – Cristian, Târgu Mureș – Chețani, Câmpia Turzii – Nădășelu, Oradea North / Biharia – Borș); approximately 85 km (53 mi) under construction (Nădășelu – Poarta Sălajului, Nușfalău – Suplacu de Barcău, Biharia – Chiribiș); estimated completion unknown
- A4: Autostrada Constanței: all 21.8 km (13.5 mi) built (Constanța Bypass);
- A6: Lugoj-Calafat highway: 10.4 km (6.5 mi) of approximately 260 km (160 mi) built (Balinț-Lugoj); estimated completion unknown;
- A7: Autostrada Moldova (Moldova highway): 16.2 km (10.1 mi) of approximately 450 km (280 mi) built (Bacău Bypass);
- A8: East–west highway: 300 km (190 mi) planned for completion unknown;
- A10: Sebeș-Turda highway: all 70 km (43 mi) built
- A11: Arad – Oradea highway: 3 km (1.9 mi) of approximately 135 km (84 mi) built (Arad Bypass); 19 km (12 mi) under construction (Oradea bypass); estimated completion unknown
- DX6: Galați–Brăila Expressway: 12.29 km (7.64 mi) under construction; estimated completion in 2023
- DX12: Pitești–Craiova Expressway: 121.18 km (75.30 mi) under construction; estimated completion in 2023

There are no tolls for using the motorways in Romania, except Cernavodă Bridge over the Danube on the A2. Nevertheless, every Romanian car that uses a motorway or a national road in Romania must pay a toll, specifically a vignette. A few years ago the vignette was ported to an electronic format, thus eliminating the need for a physical display (sticker).

=== Russia ===
Russia has many highways, but only a small number of them are currently motorways. Examples of Russian motorways are Moscow and Saint Petersburg Ring Roads. Highways and motorways are free in Russia and only two motorways, Western High Speed Diameter and Moscow-Saint Petersburg toll motorway, have tolls. Russians themselves often translate the Russian name for 'highway' (Автомобильные дороги lit. 'automobile roads') into motorway in English, which is incorrect.

=== Serbia ===
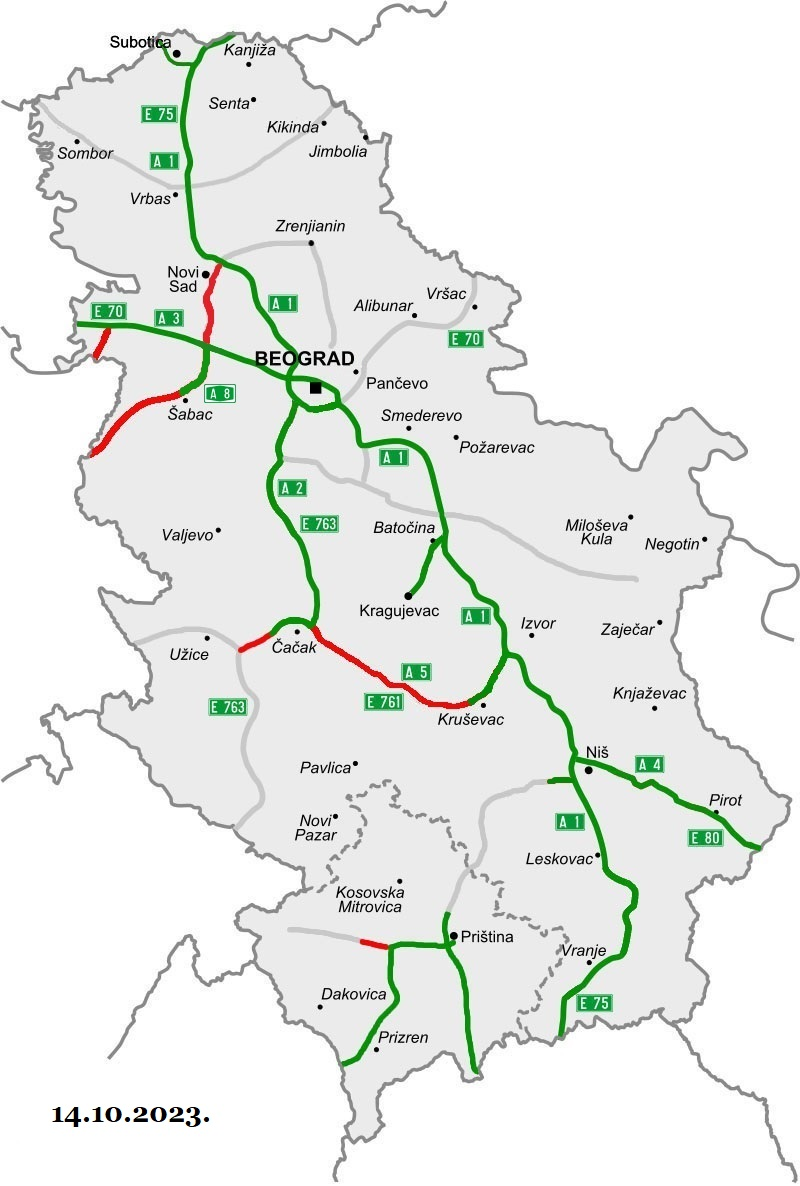
Map of Serbian highways

The highways in Serbia are classified as IA state roads and the common name for highway is auto-put, which functions based on a toll pay system and controlled access. Serbia currently has a total of 876 km (544 mi) of highways (the total length of public roads is 40,845 km (25,380 mi)), while 1,154 km (717 mi) are planned. Because of its geographical position, it is very important for the transit of capital, goods and services through Europe and the Balkans, especially. It is also one of the most important countries in the Balkans for Pan-European corridors (E65, E70, E75, E80, E661, E662, E761, E763, E771, E851).

Signs on Serbian highways are green and the speed limit is 130 km/h (81 mph). The history of Serbian highways starts with socialist Yugoslavia, when increased production influenced the increase of transit on public roads. The first highway to be built was Brotherhood and Unity Highway which encompassed Slovenia, Croatia, Serbia and Macedonia. The highway was part of the Pan-European Corridor X and was built around the 1970s.

=== Slovakia ===
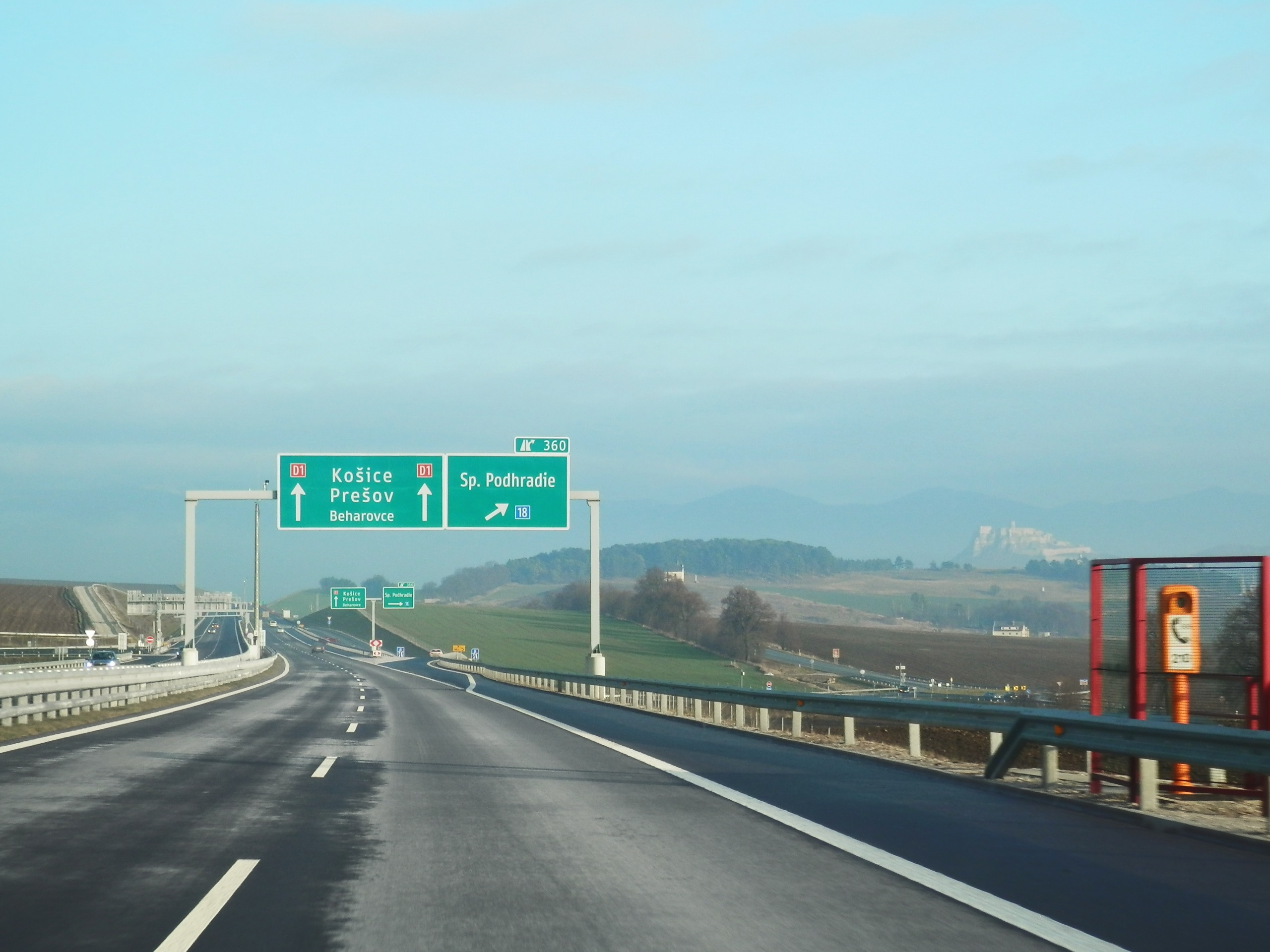
D1 motorway in Slovakia

The highways in Slovakia are divided into motorways (diaľnica) and expressways (rýchlostné cesty). The first modern highway in Slovakia should have been in the 1930s – a planned motorway connecting Prague with northern parts of Slovakia; however, the construction of Slovak motorways was not started until the 1970s.

As of December 2018, 486 km (302 mi) of motorways and 265 km (165 mi) of expressways are in service, with another 120 km (75 mi) being under various stages of construction.

=== Slovenia ===
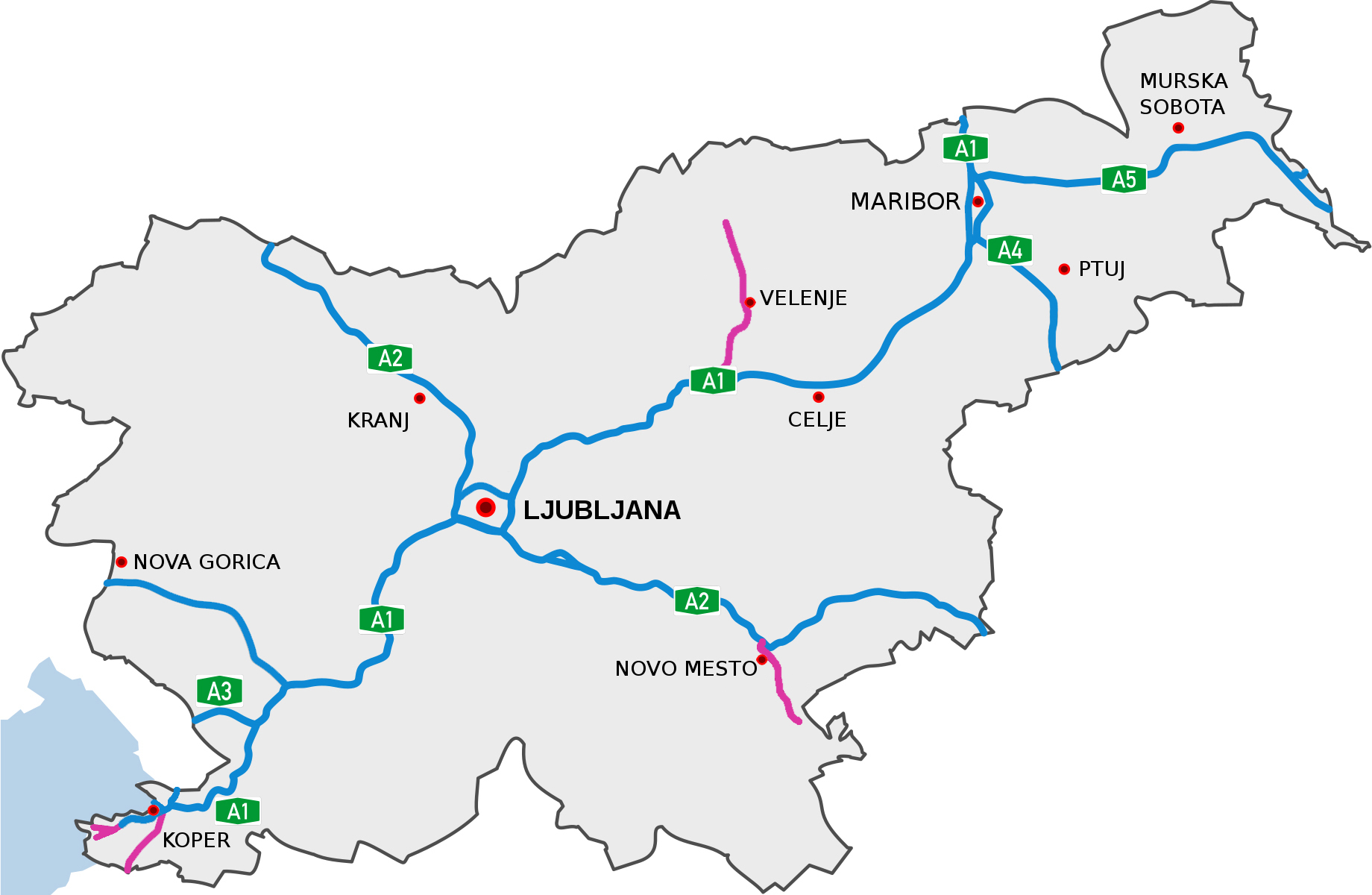
Map of Slovenian highways

The highways in Slovenia are central state roads and are divided into motorways (Slovene: avtocesta, AC) and expressways (hitra cesta, HC). Motorways are dual carriageways with a speed limit of 130 km/h (81 mph). They have white-on-green road signs as in Italy, Croatia and other countries nearby. Expressways are secondary highways, also dual carriageways, but often without the hard shoulder. They have a speed limit of 110 km/h (68 mph) and have white-on-blue road signs.

=== Spain ===
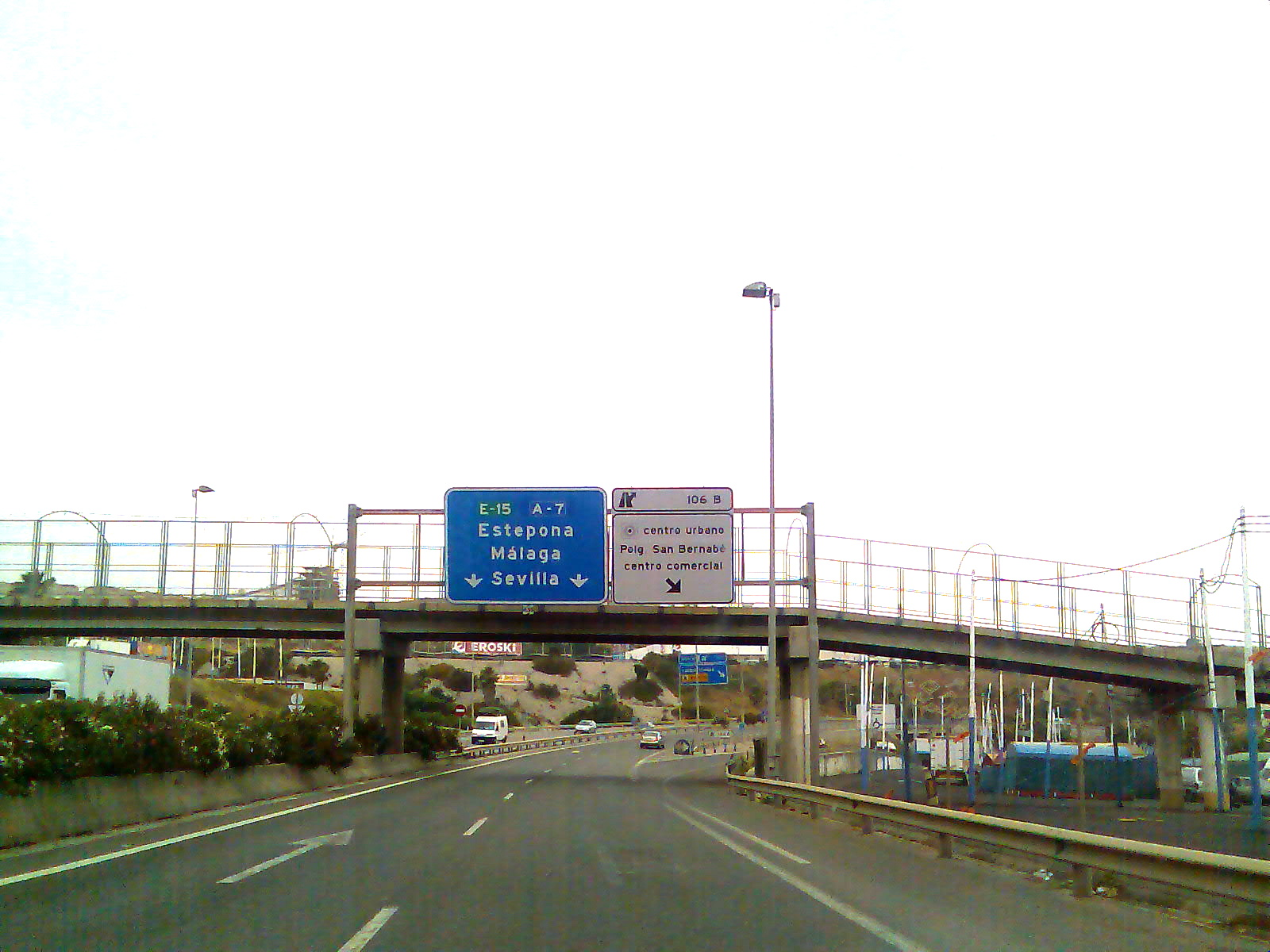
An older highway in Spain

Spain's national highway system dates back to the era of King Carlos III. The roads built at this time, radiating from Madrid, form the basis for the carreteras nacionales radiales, numbered clockwise from I to VI, which radiate from Madrid to major ports or border crossings. In the 1960s Spain started to construct autopistas (toll highways) and autovías (freeways), and in 2016 had 17,109 km (10,631 mi) of highways, the biggest network in Europe and the fourth in the world, only after the USA, India, and China.

=== Sweden ===
The first freeway in Sweden was built between the cities of Malmö and Lund in the Skåne County in southern Sweden. Swedish roads are divided into three classes; motorväg, which is a 4–8 lane motorway with a speed limit of 110–120 km/h (68–75 mph), riksväg, which is a state highway with 2–4 lanes and a speed limit of 70–100 km/h (43–62 mph), and länsväg, which is a "county route" with two lanes and a 70–90 km/h (43–56 mph) speed limit. The authority responsible for the roads in Sweden is the Swedish Transport Administration (Trafikverket).

=== Switzerland ===
The term Autobahn (German)/Autoroute (French)/Autostrada (Italian) is used for normal highways where there is a central physical structure separating two different directional carriageways. This is often translated into English as motorways.

In express routes where there is no central physical structure separating two different directional carriageways but crossings are still motorway-like otherwise, and traffic lights are not present, the road is instead called an Autostrasse/Semi-autoroute/Semi-autostrada, usually translated into English as expressway. They often have a lower speed limit than motorways.

=== United Kingdom ===
In the United Kingdom, the terms used for vehicular highways other than motorways include main road, trunk road, 'A' road / 'B' road, 'C' road, and unclassified road; they may additionally, where appropriate, be described as dual carriageways. However, in the law of England and Wales the term public highway includes all public rights of way regardless of the kind or amount of traffic they allow, including streets and public footpaths for pedestrians. The term also includes bridleways, which are for pedestrians, equestrians, and cyclists, as well as by-ways open to all traffic (for all of those users, plus vehicular traffic).

In England and Wales, the public is said to have a "right of way" over a highway. This means that, subject to statutory restrictions, the route (or "way") must be kept clear to allow travel by anyone who wishes to it. At common law, it is unlawful to obstruct a highway or to interfere with its lawful use. However, many statutory provisions provide powers to do so (for instance. to carry out roadwork).

Many public highways in the UK have a private owner. That is, someone can prove "title" to them, either by being the registered owner or by having conveyances showing exactly how the land has been bought and sold over a long period of time. Such ownership in no way affects the public highway rights, since the relevant "highway authority" (usually a local authority or the Highways Agency in England and Wales, or Amey Highways in Scotland) is deemed to own the surface of the highway, despite someone else's ownership of the land it passes over or under.

Rights-of-way exist over all highways maintained at the public expense (the majority of roads) and also over some other ways which are not so maintained, on the principle of "once a highway, always a highway". In such cases, landowners must allow public use for "passing and repassing".

A right-of-way may be created by custom (by the way being used for a long period of time) or under the relevant Sections of the Highways Act of 1980. A right-of-way may be extinguished or diverted in a number of ways, such as by an Act of Parliament, by a magistrates' stopping-up or diversion order, or by powers given to principal local authorities. For instance, under the Channel Tunnel Rail Link Act of 1996, authority was given for the builder of this railway link to stop up certain highways that are mentioned in Schedule 3 of the act.

The opposite of a highway is a private road or pathway over which no rights-of-way exist. Any use of such private ways is subject to the consent of the owner of the land.

Richard Mabey proposes that the origin of the word highway dates back to the Romans in his book The Roadside Wildlife Book (1974): "Daniel Defoe, writing in the 1720s, describes the Fosse Way as being raised eight or nine feet in many places. Between AD 40 and 80, the Romans laid something like 6,500 miles of highway."

== Oceania ==
=== Australia ===
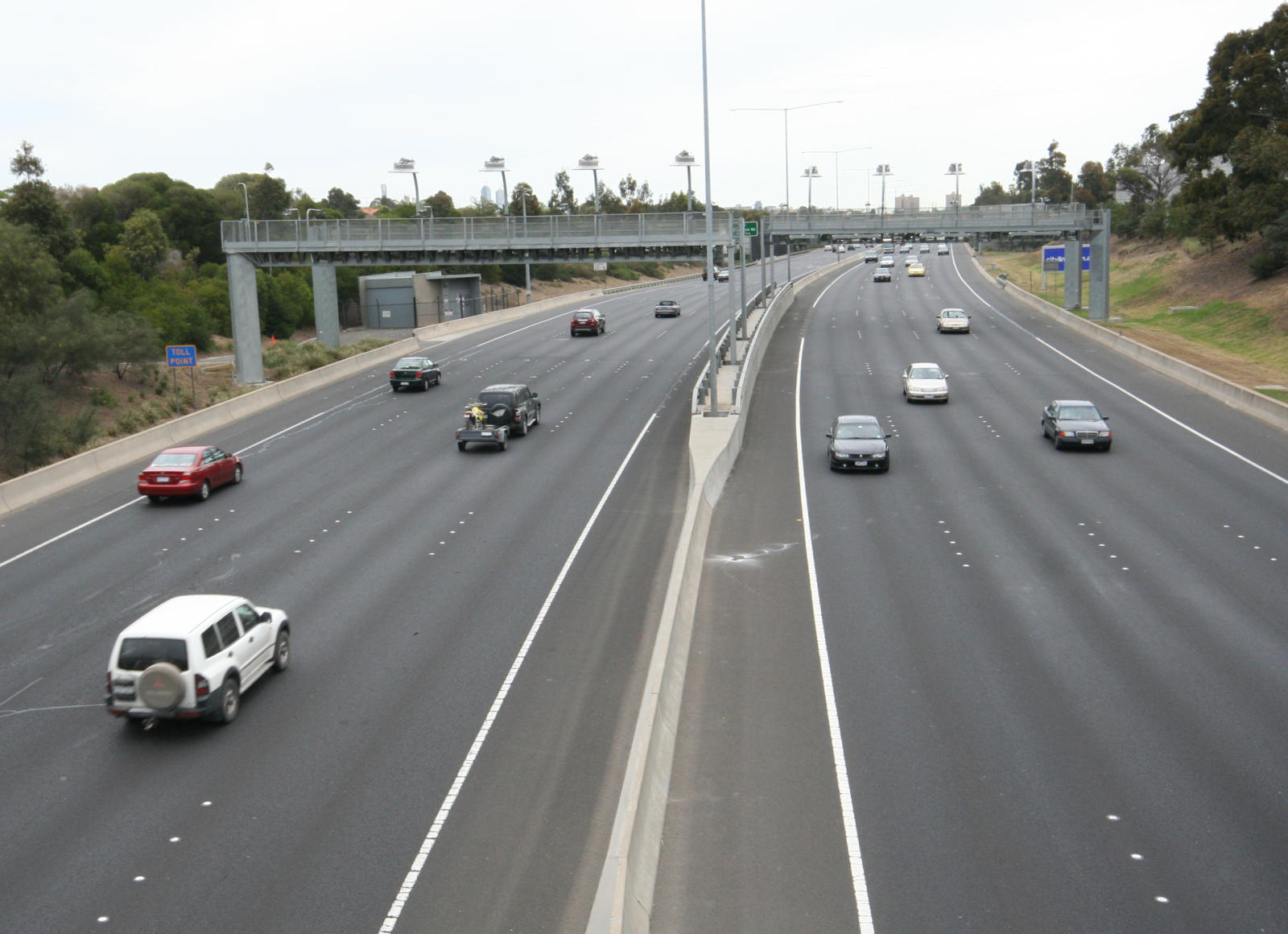
The Tullamarine Freeway showing toll gantries in Melbourne, Australia

In Australia, a highway is a distinct type of road from freeways, expressways, and motorways. The word highway is generally used to mean major roads connecting large cities, towns and different parts of metropolitan areas. Metropolitan highways often have traffic lights at intersections, and rural highways usually have only one lane in each direction. The words freeway, expressway or motorway are generally reserved for the most arterial routes, usually with grade-separated intersections and usually significantly straightened and widened to a minimum of four lanes. The term motorway is used in some Australian cities to refer to freeways that have been allocated a metropolitan route number. Roads may be part-highway and part-freeway until they are fully upgraded. The Cahill expressway is the only named expressway in New South Wales, which opened in 1954, the first in the region.

=== New Zealand ===
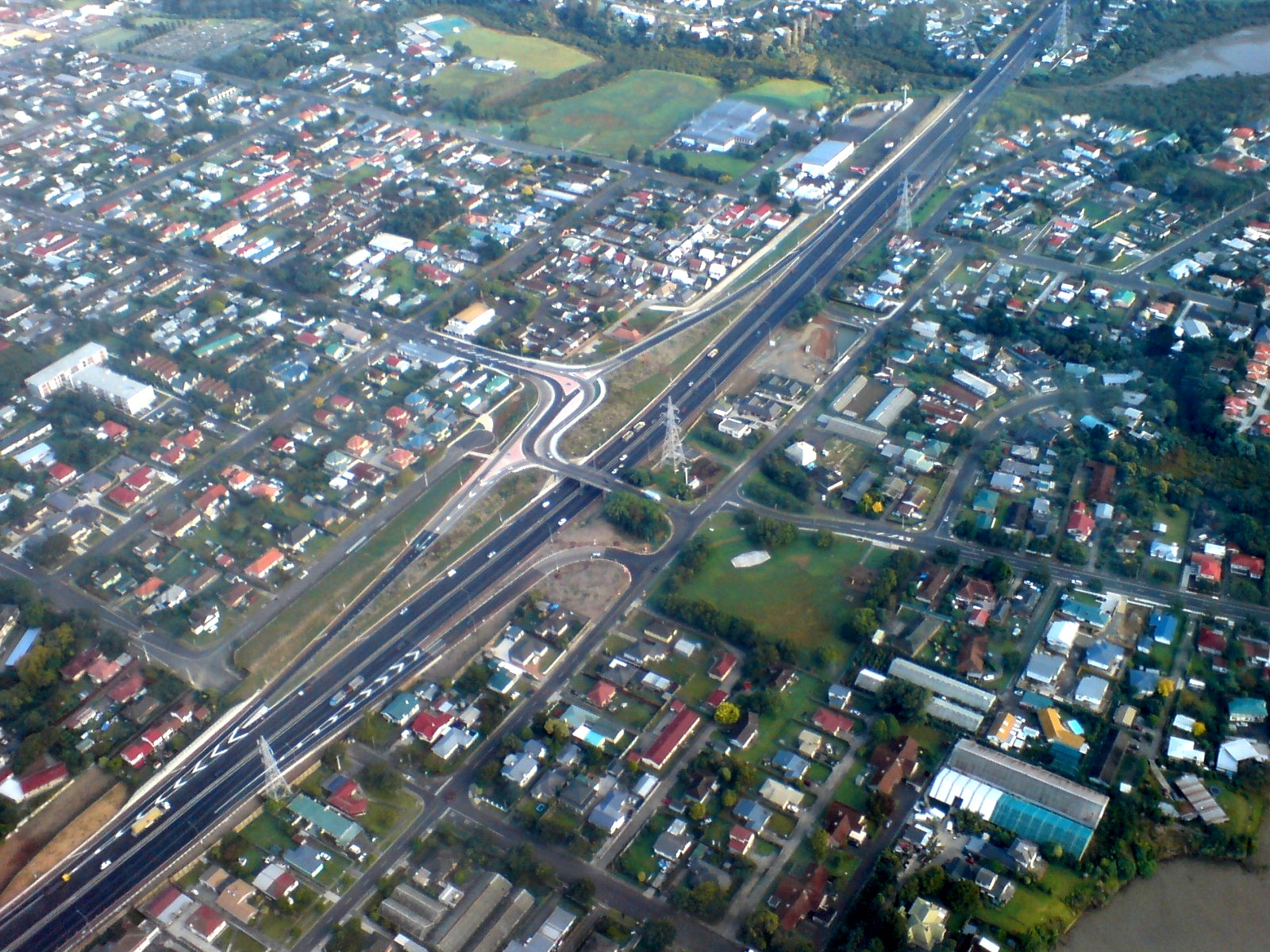
State Highway 1 in South Auckland, New Zealand

In New Zealand, both motorway and an expressway have at least two lanes of traffic in either direction separated by a median, with no access to adjacent properties. The distinction depends on the type of traffic allowed to use the route. Non-vehicular traffic and farm equipment are prohibited from motorways, while pedestrians, cyclists, tractors, and farm animals are legally entitled to use expressways such as the Waikato Expressway south of the Bombay Hills and the Tauranga expressway system, although this is rare. New Zealand's main routes are designated state highways as they are funded by the central government. State Highway 1 is the only route to run through both the North and South Islands, and runs (in order north–south) from Cape Reinga to Wellington in the North Island, and from Picton to Bluff in the South Island. State Highways 2–5 are main routes in the North Island, State Highways 6–9 in the South Island, and state highways numbered from 10 onwards are generally found in numerical order from north to south. State highways usually incorporate different standards of roads, for example, State Highway 1 from Auckland to Hamilton incorporates the Northern and Southern Motorways in the Auckland area, the Waikato Expressway, and a rural road before passing through the streets of Hamilton. The term freeway is rarely used relating to New Zealand roads.
