= Ontario Highway 407 =

Controlled-access highway in Ontario

407 ETR / Highway 407
- Highway 407 highlighted in red

Route information
- Maintained by Province of Ontario; 407 ETR Concession Company Limited
- Length: 151.4 km (94.1 mi)
- History: Proposed 1959–1986, Opened 1997–2001; Extended 2016–2019

Major junctions
- West end: Highway 403 / Queen Elizabeth Way in Burlington
- Highway 403 in Mississauga; Highway 401 in Milton; Highway 410 in Brampton; Highway 427 in Vaughan; Highway 400 in Vaughan; Highway 404 in Markham; Highway 412 in Whitby; Highway 418 in Clarington
- East end: Highway 35 / Highway 115 in Clarington

Location
- Country: Canada
- Province: Ontario

Highway system
- Roads in Ontario
← Highway 406	→ Highway 409

King's Highway 407, commonly referred to as Highway 407 and colloquially as the "four-oh-seven", is a 400-series highway in the Canadian province of Ontario. Comprising a tolled privately-leased western segment and a free publicly-operated eastern segment, the route spans the entire Greater Toronto Area (GTA) around the city of Toronto, travelling through the suburbs of Burlington, Oakville, Mississauga, Brampton, Vaughan, Markham, Pickering, Whitby, and Oshawa before ending in Clarington, north of Orono and Newcastle. At 151.4 kilometres (94.1 mi) long, it is the fourth-longest expressway in Ontario's 400-series network, after Highways 417, 400, and 401. The tolled segment between Burlington and Brougham in Pickering is leased to and operated by the 407 ETR Concession Company Limited and is officially known as the 407 Express Toll Route (407 ETR). It begins at the Freeman Interchange between the Queen Elizabeth Way (QEW) and Highway 403 in Burlington; the highway travels 108.0 kilometres (67.1 mi) across the urban GTA to Brock Road in Pickering. East of Brock Road, the freeway continues east as Highway 407 (referred to as Highway 407 East during development to distinguish it from 407 ETR), a route operated by the provincial government and formerly tolled, for 43.4 kilometres (27.0 mi) to Highway 35/115 in Clarington. The route interchanges with nine freeways in Ontario: the QEW, Highway 403, Highway 401, Highway 410, Highway 427, Highway 400, Highway 404, Highway 412, and Highway 418. 407 ETR is an electronically operated toll highway; there are no toll booths along the route. Distances are calculated automatically using transponders or automatic number-plate recognition, which are scanned at entrance and exit portals.

Highway 407 was planned in the late 1950s as a freeway bypassing Toronto's segment of Highway 401, the busiest highway in North America. However, construction did not begin until 1987. During the early 1990s, the provincial government proposed tolling the highway to alleviate a revenue shortfall. The central sections of Highway 407 opened in 1997, and the remaining sections were built quickly over the following four years, with the final segment opening in mid-2001. Despite being included in the 400-series network, the Highway 407 ETR section is not considered part of the provincial highway network as it is now privately operated. The segment is operated privately under a 99-year lease agreement signed with the Conservative provincial government, which was sold in 1999 for about C$3.1 billion to a consortium of Canadian and Spanish investors operating under the name 407 International Inc. The privatization of the Highway 407 ETR section has been the source of significant criticism, especially regarding increases in tolls, plate denial, and false charges. In addition, the safety of segments built after the sale of the freeway has been called into question.

Phase 1 of a provincially owned and tolled extension of the route, known solely as Highway 407 (not Highway 407 ETR), opened to traffic from Brock Road in Pickering to Harmony Road in Oshawa on June 20, 2016. Included as part of this extension was the construction of a tolled north–south link between Highways 401 and 407, known as Highway 412. Phase 2 later extended the provincially owned portion of Highway 407 to Highway 35 / Highway 115 in Clarington. This construction was completed in two stages, with Phase 2A opening on January 2, 2018, as a 9.6-kilometre (6.0 mi) extension to Taunton Road, and Phase 2B opening on December 9, 2019, as a 23.3-kilometre (14.5 mi) extension to Highway 35 and Highway 115. Included as part of this extension was the construction of another tolled north–south link between Highways 401 and 407, known as Highway 418.

Unusually, Highway 407 does not reach or pass through any of its three control cities: Hamilton, Toronto, or Peterborough. Hamilton is accessed by following either the QEW or Highway 403 beyond its western terminus in Burlington. Toronto proper is bypassed but is used as a control city due to the similar sizes of the suburban municipalities the highway passes through in York and Peel Regions, and control cities are not shown at street entrances in these regions, as is the case for freeways passing through Toronto. In the east, Peterborough is reached by briefly following the Highway 35/Highway 115 concurrency north and then continuing northeast on Highway 115 alone.

The speed limit is 100 km/h (62 mph) throughout most of its length, with the exception being on the easternly provincially owned portion, where the speed limit is 110 km/h (68 mph). The route is patrolled by the Ontario Provincial Police (OPP) and maintained by the 407 ETR for the privately owned portion and by the Ministry of Transportation of Ontario (MTO) for the easternly provincially owned portion.

== Route description ==
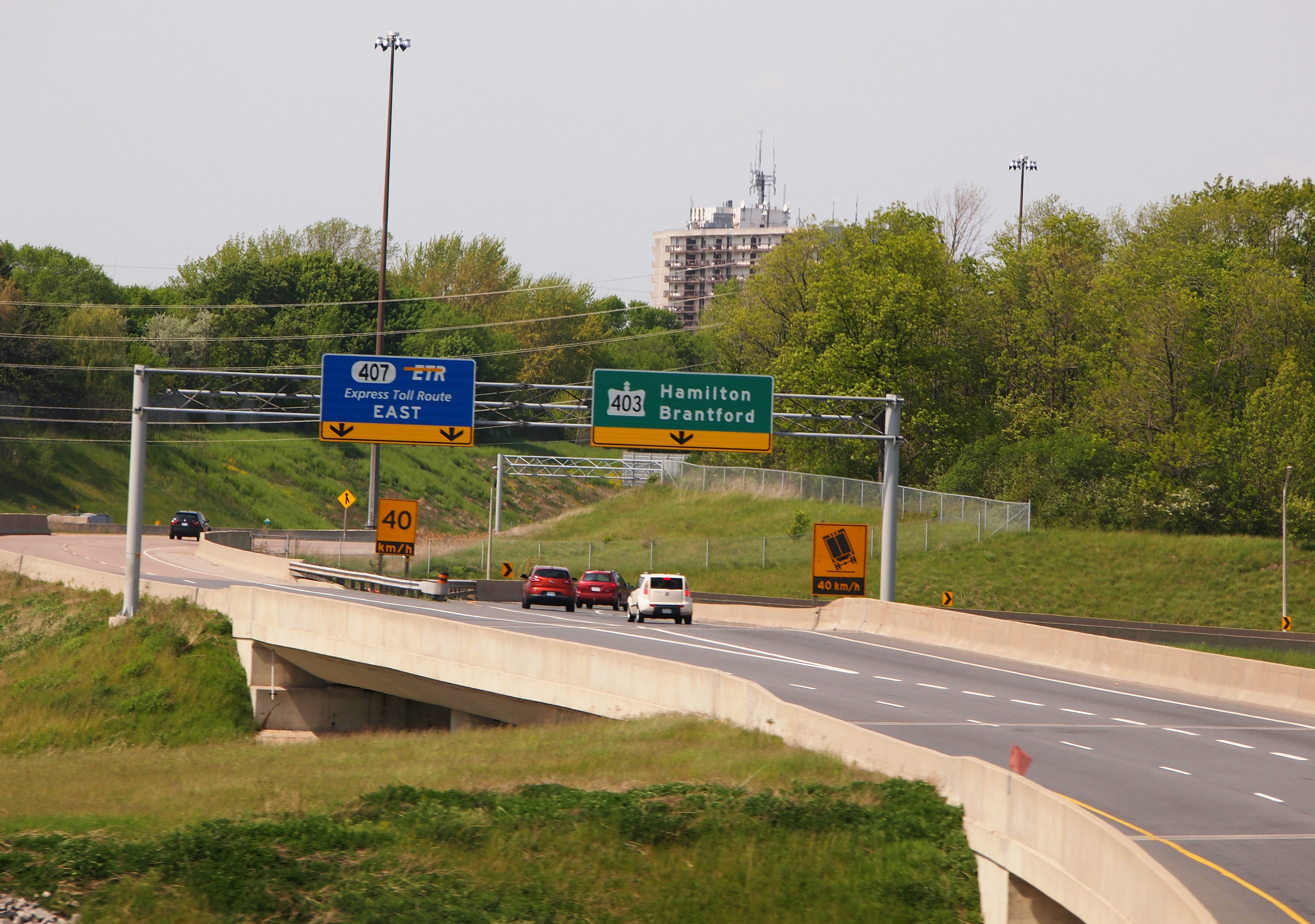
Highway 407 begins at the Highway 403/Queen Elizabeth Way junction in Burlington.

Highway 407 is a 151.4-kilometre (94.1 mi) controlled-access highway (freeway) that encircles the GTA, passing through Burlington, Oakville, Mississauga, Brampton, Vaughan, Markham, Pickering, Whitby, Oshawa, and Clarington, as well as travelling immediately north of Toronto. Although the general public felt that tolling made the highway a luxury rather than fulfilling its original purpose of relieving traffic on Highway 401, Highway 407 ETR had average daily trip counts of over 350,000 vehicles in June 2014. The 407 ETR is contractually responsible for maintaining high traffic levels as justification for increasing tolls, but conducts its own traffic studies. Despite increased usage, parallel roads that Highway 407 was intended to supplement continue to grow congested, forcing the MTO to revisit costly widening projects of Highway 401 and the QEW.

Highway 407 was designed with aesthetics and environmental concerns in mind, featuring landscaped embankments, 79 storm drainage ponds, and a curb and gutter system. Unlike most Ontario highways, it features concrete pavement as opposed to top-coated asphalt. Because of this, the high-mast lighting along the urban portions of the route features fewer luminaires than asphalt-surfaced freeways.

=== Burlington–Vaughan ===
Highway 407 begins in Burlington within Halton Region (part of the GTA) at the Freeman Interchange between Highway 403 and the QEW, from which it branches off northward. The six-lane route passes under Brant Street (Halton Regional Road 18), Upper Middle Road, and Guelph Line (Halton Regional Road 1), before it interchanges with Dundas Street (Halton Regional Road 5, formerly Highway 5). It briefly enters green space as it curves gently to the northeast, ultimately avoiding the nearby Niagara Escarpment. The route is crossed by Walkers Line, east of which residential subdivisions line the south side and green space lines the north of the highway. At an interchange with Appleby Line (Halton Regional Road 20), the highway straightens and travels parallel to Dundas Street before passing over Bronte Creek and under the Canadian National Railway's (CN) Halton Subdivision.

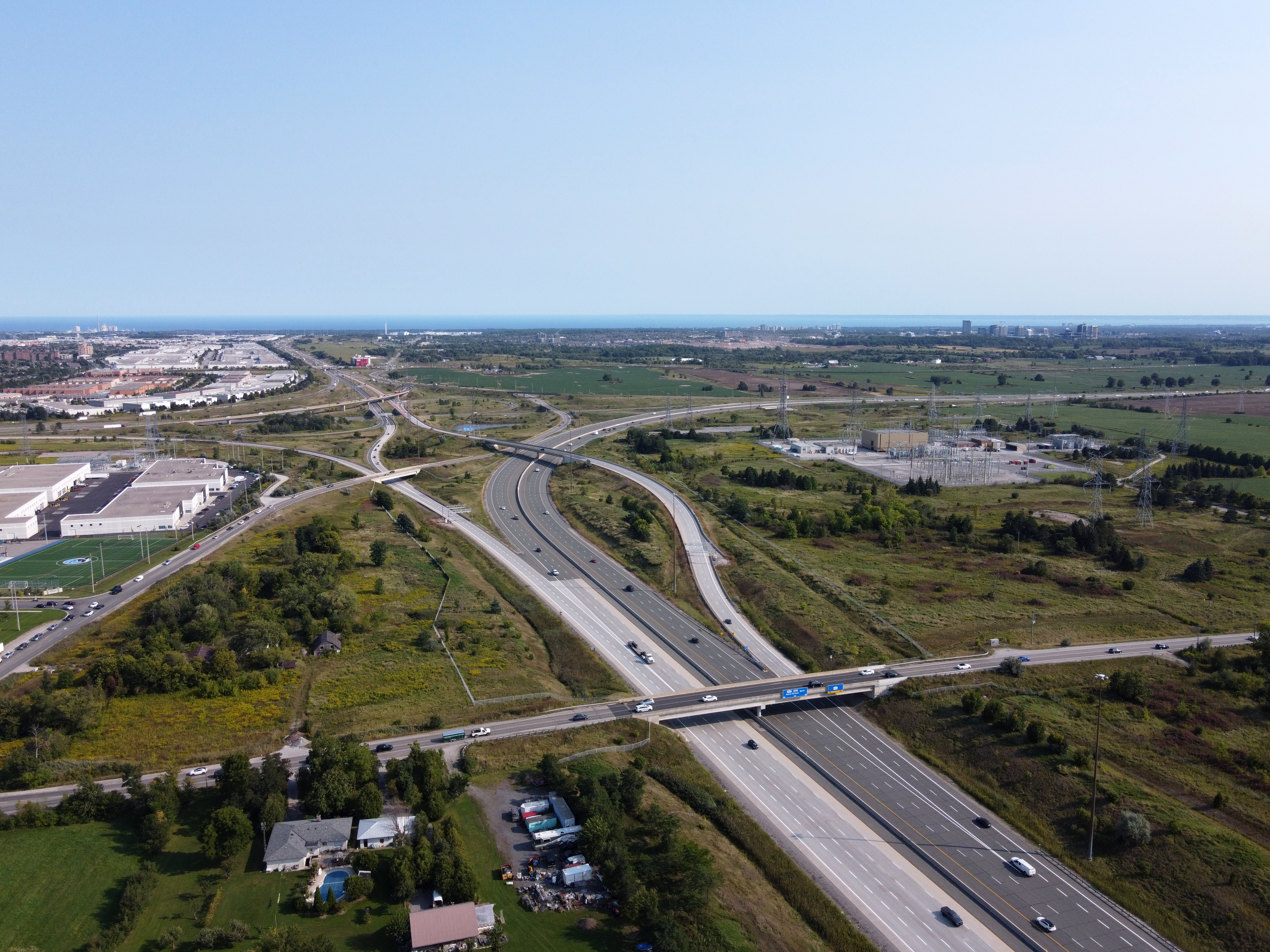
Highway 407 alignment to Highway 403 in Mississauga.

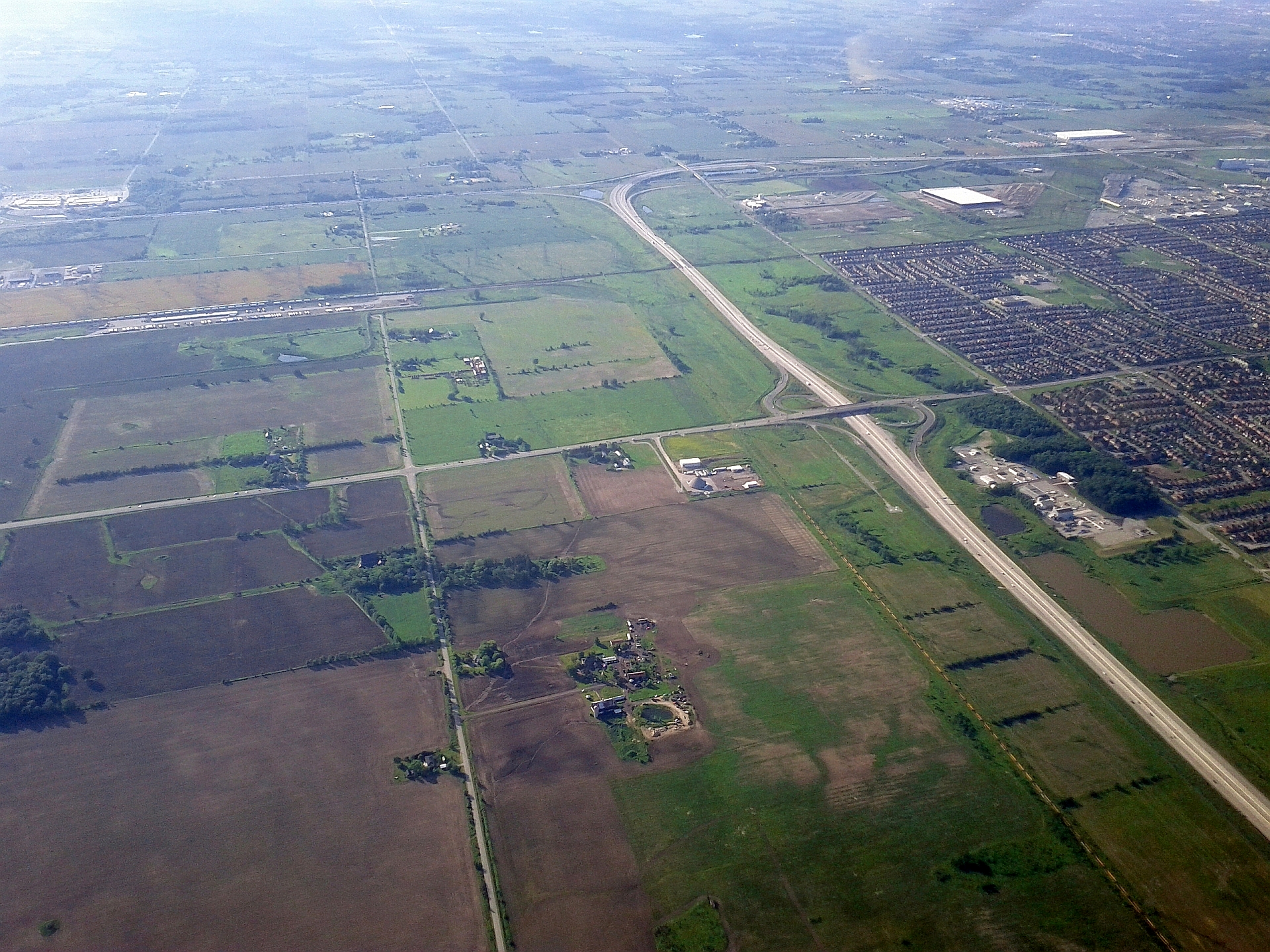
Highway 407 south of Highway 401; this section follows a north–south alignment to Highway 403.

East of Bronte Creek, Highway 407 enters an agricultural area, which is interspersed with woodlots. It enters Oakville at the Tremaine Road (Halton Regional Road 22) overpass, then gradually swerves to the north as it encounters an interchange with Bronte Road (Halton Regional Road 25, formerly Highway 25). The route crosses Sixteen Mile Creek just north of Glenarchy Conservation Area, then travels parallel to the creek for several kilometres. It swerves north after an interchange with Neyagawa Boulevard (Halton Regional Road 4), north of the Hamlet of Glenarchy. After diverging from the creek, it curves northeast, parallel to and north of Burnhamthorpe Road (Halton Regional Road 27) and the William Halton Parkway (Burnhamthorpe Road's bypass), where it crosses under Sixth Line and interchanges with Trafalgar Road (Halton Regional Road 3). Highway 407 then encounters Highway 403 (near Hydro One Trafalgar Transformer Station), where it curves sharply to the northwest, while Highway 403 curves from the southeast to the northeast; resulting in both highways meeting and deflecting at a 90-degree angle and not crossing each other.

Now travelling parallel to and immediately west of the Halton–Peel regional boundary and Milton–Mississauga city limits, the six-lane Highway 407 progresses northwest alongside Hydro One's power transmission corridor (hydro corridor), with residential areas to the east and farmland to the west. The route continues as such northwest to Highway 401, passing under Lower Base Line and Eglinton Avenue and interchanging with Britannia Road and Derry Road (Halton Regional Roads 6 and 7) before crossing the Canadian Pacific Railway's (CP) Galt Subdivision; it then crosses under transmission lines. At an interchange with Highway 401, the route makes a sharp curve to the northeast, while interconnecting ramps weave across both freeways over several kilometres. It enters Peel Region at the Winston Churchill Boulevard (Peel Regional Road 19) overpass, then follows another hydro corridor just north of the Brampton–Mississauga boundary.

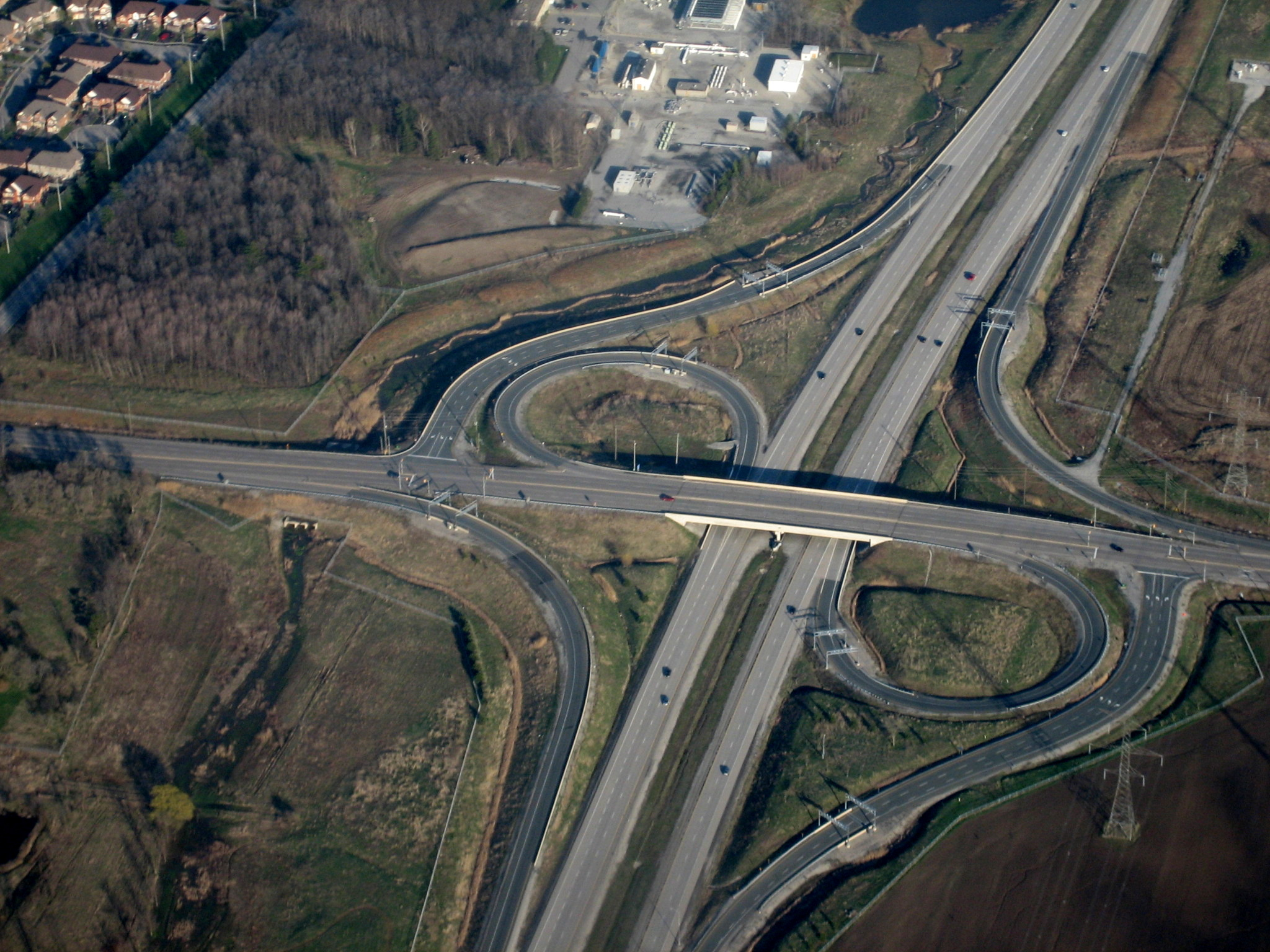
Highway 407 and Derry Road, facing southwest; this section of Highway 407 parallels the boundary between Mississauga (at left) and Milton (at right).

Highway 407 swerves northeast again, encountering an interchange with Mississauga Road (Peel Regional Road 1) just prior to crossing the Credit River and the Orangeville Brampton Railway, after which it enters the urban GTA. After passing through interchanges with Mavis Road (Peel Regional Road 18) and Hurontario Street (formerly Highway 10), the highway encounters Highway 410 at another sprawling interchange located over Etobicoke Creek. Over the next seven kilometres (4.3 mi), the highway nudges northward into Brampton, interchanging with Dixie Road (Peel Regional Road 4) and Bramalea Road, meeting another CN railway line, and crossing over the CN Halton Subdivision, before crossing under Steeles Avenue (Peel Regional Road 15). Highway 407 curves back to the northeast as it interchanges with Airport Road (Peel Regional Road 7) and passes beneath another CN line, before crossing under hydro lines and encountering the final interchange in Peel Region at Goreway Drive, as York Region is ahead. It crosses the West Humber River and under former Highway 50 in Claireville Conservation Area before curving east into Vaughan, in York Region.

=== Vaughan–Pickering ===
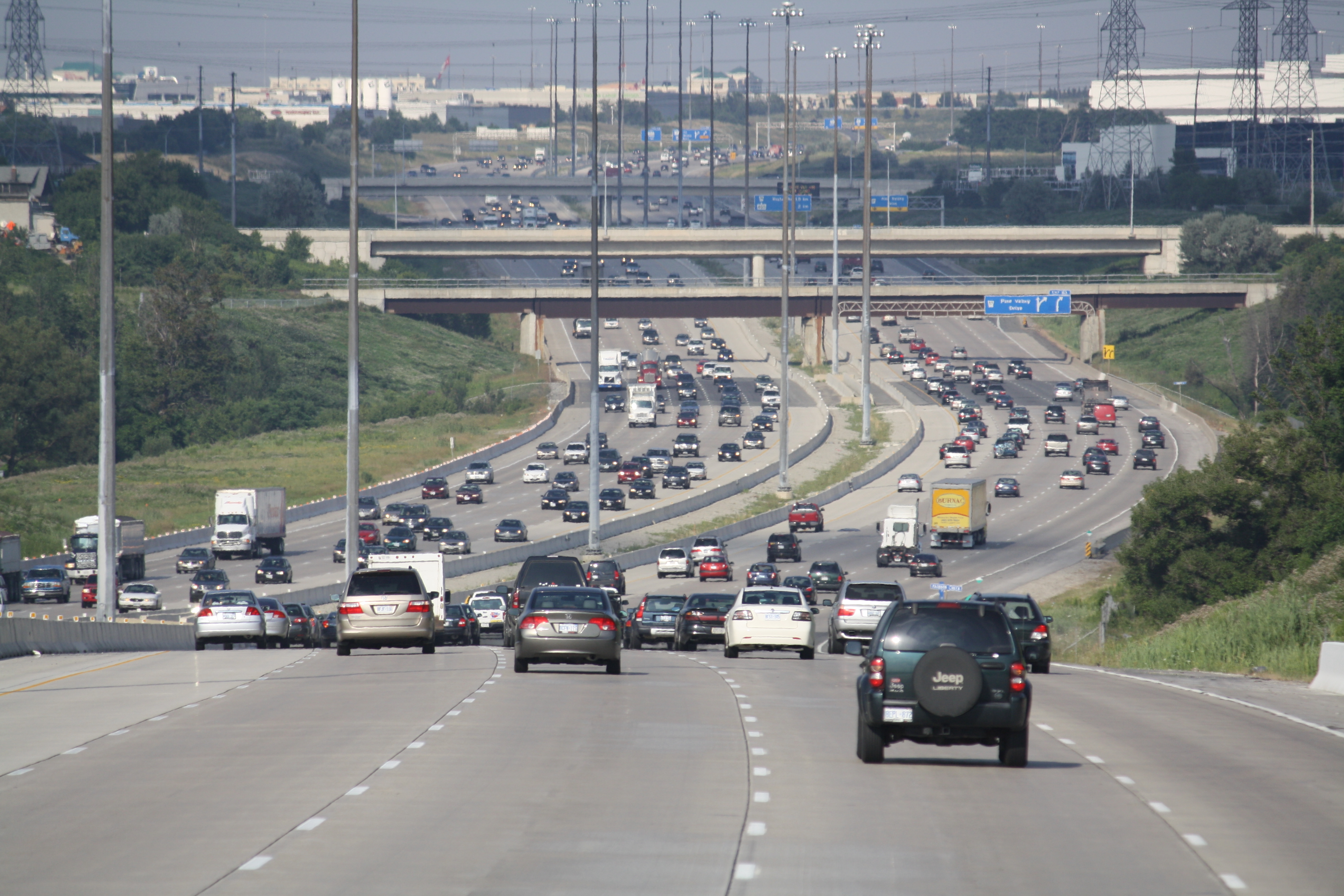
Highway 407 facing east toward Pine Valley Drive with a hydro corridor, in Vaughan.

Immediately after crossing into Vaughan and York Region, Highway 407 encounters the first of three large interchanges with other 400-series highways. The Highway 427 interchange is a four-level partial stack located just north of Steeles Avenue (York Regional Road 95) and adjacent to the 407 ETR Concession Company offices. The interchange features weaved ramps which connect to former Highway 27 (York Regional Road 27), located just to the east. The route continues eastward, parallel to and north of Steeles Avenue and south of Highway 7 (York Regional Road 7). It dives through the Humber River Valley alongside a CN line and along the northern border of Thackeray Conservation Lands, passing beneath a CP line. After crossing under transmission lines of a hydro corridor (now remerged back into two hydro towers) and interchanging with Pine Valley Drive (York Regional Road 57), the route becomes sandwiched between the industrial lands of the Pine Valley Business Park and the Emery Creek Corporate Park, Greater Toronto's industrial places. A partial interchange with Weston Road (York Regional Road 56) lies just west of the large, four-level stack interchange with Highway 400 (Toronto–Barrie Highway), the only of its kind in Canada. An interchange with Jane Street (York Regional Road 55) is interwoven into the east side of the Highway 400 interchange, below which pass the tunnels of the Line 1 Yonge–University subway; the Highway 407 station (with its large commuter parking lot and GO Transit bus terminal serving the highway corridor) is located south of the highway.

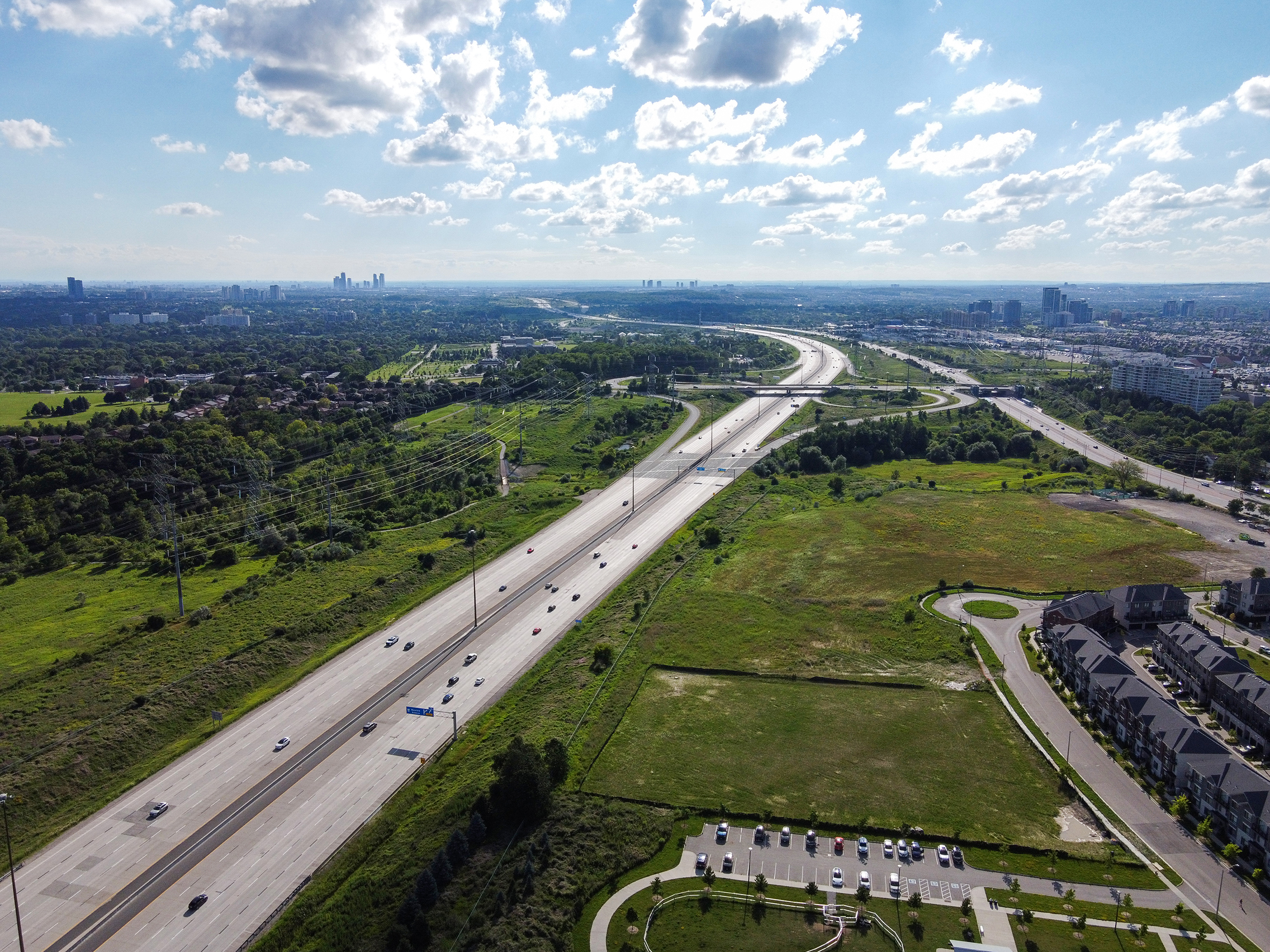
Highway 407 east of Bayview Ave., near the boundary of Markham and Richmond Hill.

Still travelling alongside a hydro corridor, Highway 407 crosses a complex rail wye, which provides access to the CN freight yards to the north. After interchanging with Keele Street] (York Regional Road 6), the route gently curves northward, passing under the CN Newmarket Subdivision, which carries the GO Transit Barrie line; it then crosses the Don River. It curves back eastward as it interchanges with Dufferin Street (York Regional Road 53), travelling adjacent to and south of Highway 7. After it interchanges with Bathurst Street (York Regional Road 38), Highway 407 crosses under transmission lines at an interchange with Yonge Street (York Regional Road 1, formerly Highway 11), and then crosses the CN Bala Subdivision, which carries the GO Transit Richmond Hill line. As the highway swerves east and enters Markham, it interchanges with Bayview Avenue (York Regional Road 34) and once again crosses under transmission lines. A second partial interchange with Leslie Street (York Regional Road 12) precedes the third and final large freeway–freeway junction at Highway 404, known as a multi-level combination interchange.

East of Highway 404, the freeway travels generally parallel to the Rouge River. It interchanges with Woodbine Avenue (York Regional Road 8) and Warden Avenue (York Regional Road 65), east of which the route travels alongside a CN line and crosses the GO Transit Stouffville line (near the Unionville GO Station). Highway 407 continues straight eastward into a residential area, interchanging with Kennedy Road (York Regional Road 3), McCowan Road (York Regional Road 67), and Markham Road (York Regional Road 68), where it diverges from both a CN line and hydro corridor. After crossing the river, the route interchanges with Ninth Line (York Regional Road 69) and Donald Cousens Parkway (York Regional Road 48) before exiting the urban Greater Toronto Area (GTA), entering Rouge Park, and curving northeast over a CP line.

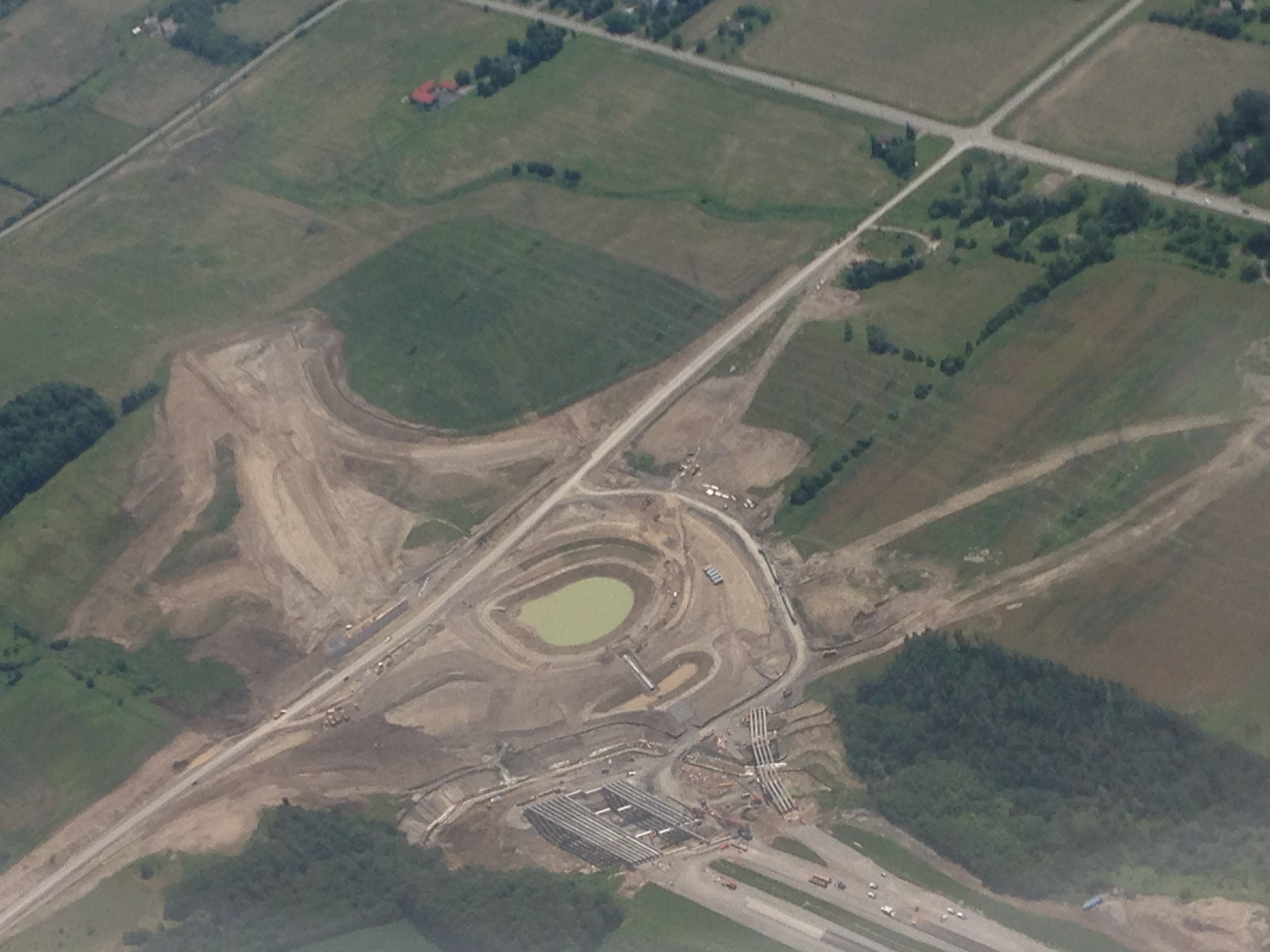
Construction in 2015 of the overpass and off-ramp at Harmony Road near a hydro corridor in Durham Region, the temporary terminus of the highway from June 20, 2016, until January 2, 2018.

Until the opening of the first phase of 407E in June 2016, the final interchange along Highway 407 was with York–Durham Line (York/Durham Regional Road 30), the boundary between York Region and Durham Region, as well as Markham and Pickering.

Immediately after exiting the urban GTA, the highway curves northeast, then crosses West Duffins Creek north of the community of Whitevale, south of the future Pickering Airport and north of the planned community of Seaton. Sandwiched between farm fields, the highway is crossed by North Road, before interchanging with Whites Road (Durham Regional Road 38, formerly Sideline 26), an interchange which opened in February 2021. Highway 407 originally ended just south of Brougham, Pickering at a signalized intersection with Brock Road (Durham Regional Road 1) until the end of 2015, where it continued eastward as Highway 7. However, a new interchange has been built in conjunction with the provincially maintained and tolled extension, Highway 407 East, which was constructed east of this point, and ties in with the current freeway, eliminating the at-grade intersection.

=== Pickering–Clarington ===
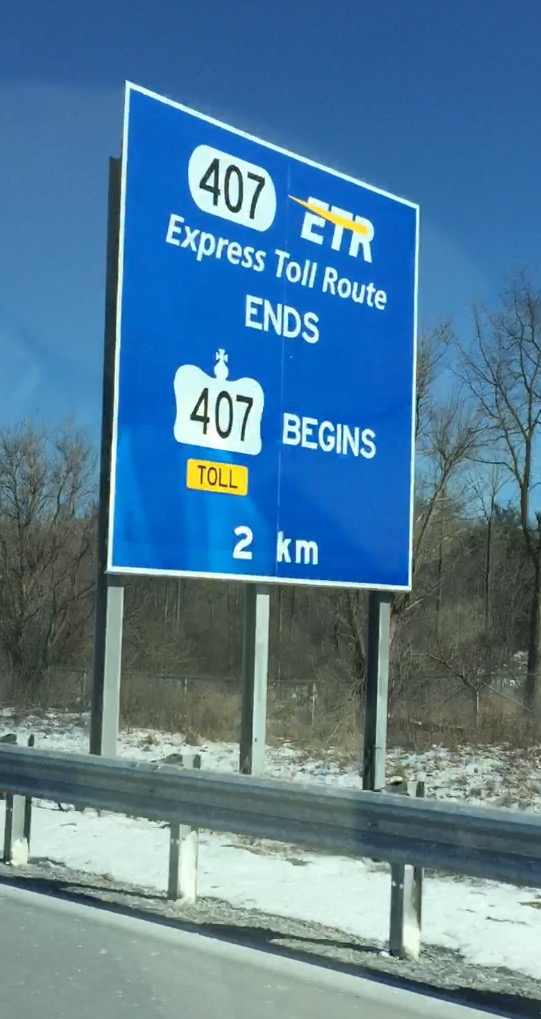
Sign for the transition between 407 ETR and 407 East in Pickering, two kilometres (one point two miles) west of Brock Road.

Immediately east of Brock Road, drivers enter the provincially operated portion of the highway. Right before Brock Road, the freeway turns northeast. After interchanging with Brock Road (near Brougham), Highway 407E is crossed by Highway 7 (now a provincial highway) and Sideline 14 before it slowly eases due east. The freeway is flanked by farmland is then crossed by Westney Road (Durham Regional Road 31), Salem Road, where there is a maintenance depot, and Kinsale Road before crossing the Pickering–Whitby border at an interchange with Lake Ridge Road (Durham Regional Road 23). Immediately east of Lake Ridge Road, the freeway meets with Ontario Highway 412 at a large Y-interchange.

Still within Greater Toronto, Highway 407 curves southeast to bypass the town of Brooklin. It is crossed by Highway 7 once again before interchanging with Highway 12/Baldwin Street (or Durham Regional Road 12) and Thickson Road (Durham Regional Road 26). The freeway becomes parallel with a hydro corridor briefly. Once again, the freeway curves northeast, crossing the Whitby–Oshawa boundary, passing over Thornton Road and Winchester Road (Durham Regional Road 3) before interchanging with Simcoe Street (Durham Regional Road 2) and Harmony Road (Durham Regional Road 33). The freeway then curves sharply southeast, crossing under the hydro lines it was just parallel to, crossing Winchester Road for the last time, and crossing the Oshawa–Clarington border. The freeway is then crossed by Langmaid Road and Concession Road 6 before turning due east and interchanging with Enfield Road (Durham Regional Road 34). The freeway passes south of the hamlet of Solina before meeting Ontario Highway 418 at another large Y-interchange. East of the 418, Highway 407 crosses under transmission lines.

Highway 407 then jogs north of the hamlet of Hampton before interchanging with Bowmanville Avenue (Durham Regional Road 57). The freeway is crossed by Middle Road, Liberty Street, and Bethesda Road before it turns slightly northeast. The freeway interchanges with Darlington-Clarke Townline with a B4 Parclo Interchange, which is the last interchange on the freeway. After crossing under hydro lines, the freeway crosses Leskard Road and Best Road, before ending at Highway 35/Highway 115 within Clarington, north of Newcastle, with a modified trumpet interchange.

Both Phase 1 of the 407 East Extension, as far as Harmony Road in Oshawa, and Highway 412 opened to traffic on June 20, 2016. Phase 2A of the 407 East Extension, as far as Taunton Road in Clarington opened to traffic on January 2, 2018. Both Phase 2B of the 407 East Extension, as far as Highway 35 and Highway 115 in Clarington and Highway 418 opened to traffic on December 9, 2019.

== Tolls ==
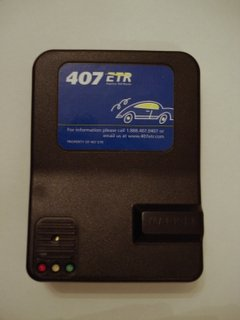

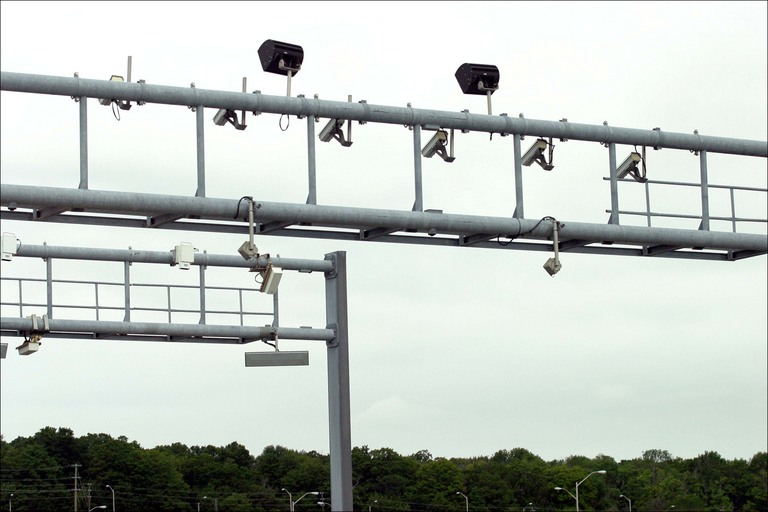
Along with transponders, The 407 uses cameras and licence plate recognition technology to toll vehicles

Similar to most other toll highways, Highway 407 features no toll booths. Rather, a system of cameras and transponders allows for automatic toll collection. It was one of the first highways to exclusively use open road tolling. Highway 407 is otherwise designed as a normal freeway; interchanges connect directly to crossroads. A radio antenna detects when a vehicle with a transponder enters and exits the highway, calculating the toll rate. For vehicles without a transponder, an automatic license plate recognition system is used. In both cases, monthly statements are mailed to users. The automatic plate recognition system is linked to several provincial and U.S. state motor vehicle registries. Toll rates are set by the 407 ETR and the Province of Ontario for their respectively owned sections. However, the province set out limitations in the 407 ETR lease contract for maintaining traffic volumes to justify toll rates. Despite this, rates have increased annually against the requests of the provincial government, resulting in several court battles and the general public regarding the route as a luxury.

=== Plate denial ===
As part of the contractual agreement with the government, the MTO is required to deny licence plate validation stickers to drivers who have an outstanding 407 ETR bill over 125 days past due. This process was temporarily halted in February 2000 due to numerous false billing claims. Following a decision by the Ontario Divisional Court on November 7, 2005, the Ontario Registrar of Motor Vehicles was ordered to begin denying the validation or issue of Ontario licence plates and vehicle permits for 407 ETR users who have failed to pay owed fees. On November 22, 2005, the MTO announced that it would appeal the decision but would begin to deny plates until the appeal was decided. On February 24, 2006, the Ontario Court of Appeals denied the government leave to appeal the 2005 decision. As a result, plate denial remains in place.

=== Rates ===
- Users of both 407 ETR and Highways 407E/412/418 only receive one bill, with trips on each highway specified.
- 407 ETR transponders were compatible with Highways 407E, 412, 418.

==== 407 ETR ====
All dollar amounts listed are Canadian dollars. EB = eastbound, WB = westbound

The rate rose for tolls in 2019 and again in 2020. On December 31, 2019, it was announced that the highway would have seasonal toll rates.

As of February 1, 2020, the base tolls for driving on the 407 ETR are as follows:

Duty Class			Light				Heavy				Heavy Multi-unit			
Zone			1	2	3	4	1	2	3	4	1	2	3	4
Time	off-peak		25.29¢/km				50.58¢/km				75.87¢/km			
Time	06:00–07:00	WB; EB	42.85; 43.76	42.83; 48.29	46.31; 47.43	44.86; 42.04	85.70; 87.52	85.66; 96.58	92.62; 94.86	89.72; 84.08	128.55; 131.28	128.49; 144.87	138.93; 142.29	134.58; 126.12
Time	07:00–09:30	WB; EB	48.74; 55.13	50.89; 56.44	54.43; 56.43	54.93; 47.83	97.48; 110.26	101.78; 112.88	108.86; 112.86	109.86; 95.66	146.22; 165.39	152.67; 169.32	163.29; 169.29	164.79; 143.49
Time	09:30–10:30	WB; EB	42.53; 45.45	44.02; 48.29	46.58; 47.43	46.58; 42.04	85.06; 90.90	88.04; 96.58	93.16; 94.86	93.16; 84.08	127.59; 136.35	132.06; 144.87	139.74; 142.29	139.74; 126.12
Time	10:30–14:30	WB; EB	39.07	39.07; 40.17	40.17; 40.90	39.07; 38.47	78.14	78.14; 80.34	80.34; 81.80	78.14; 76.94	117.21	117.21; 120.51	120.51; 122.70	117.21; 115.41
Time	14:30–15:30; 18:00–19:00	WB; EB	51.93; 44.04	50.55; 48.98	51.01; 51.92	43.62; 48.61	103.86; 88.08	101.10; 97.96	102.02; 103.84	87.84; 97.22	155.79; 132.12	151.65; 146.94	153.03; 155.76	130.86; 145.83
Time	15:30–18:00	WB; EB	61.14; 50.10	55.45; 59.00	58.99; 62.24	49.56; 58.48	122.28; 100.20	110.90; 118.00	117.98; 124.48	99.12; 116.96	183.42; 150.30	166.35; 177.00	176.97; 186.72	148.68; 175.44
Time	Midday (weekends & holidays)	WB; EB	34.63; 35.96	35.96¢/km		34.63	69.26; 71.92	71.92¢/km		69.26	103.89; 107.88	107.88¢/km		103.89
Minimum charge (vehicle with transponder)	Peak		N/A				$19.85/journey				$36.95/journey			
Minimum charge (vehicle with transponder)	Off peak		N/A				$12.80/journey				$23.85/journey			
Accessory Charge	Trip toll		$1/journey				$2/journey				$3/journey			
Additional Charge Journey without transponder	Video toll		$4.20/journey*				$50.00/journey**				$50.00/journey**			
Additional Charge Journey without transponder	Account fee		$3.95											
Transponder Lease	Annually		$24.50											
Transponder Lease	Monthly		$3.95											

- Starting February 1, 2018, there are 4 zones: 1 from QEW/403 to 401, 2 from 401 to 427, 3 from 427 to 404 and 4 from 404 to 407E (Brock Rd.)
- The toll rate that applies to a specific trip is determined by the time at which a vehicle enters the highway.
- Off-peak rates are in effect 19:00–06:00 Monday to Friday except public holidays, and 19:00–11:00 Saturday, Sunday, and holidays.
- Midday weekday rates are in effect 10:00–14:30, Monday to Friday except for holidays.
- Midday weekend/holiday rates are in effect 11:00–19:00, Saturday, Sunday, and holidays.
- Peak period rates are in effect 06:00–07:00, 09:00–10:00, 14:30–15:30 and 18:00–19:00, Monday to Friday except for public holidays.
- Peak hours rates are in effect 07:00–09:00 and 15:30–18:00, Monday to Friday except for public holidays.
- Heavy goods vehicles and lorries are assessed a minimum toll regardless of the length of their trip.

* Light goods vehicles without transponders are assessed an additional video toll. Motorcycles are not charged a video toll because there is rarely a suitable place to mount a transponder.
** Heavy-duty vehicles are legally required to have transponders in order to use the highway; offenders may be penalized under the Highway Traffic Act.

==== Provincially operated section ====
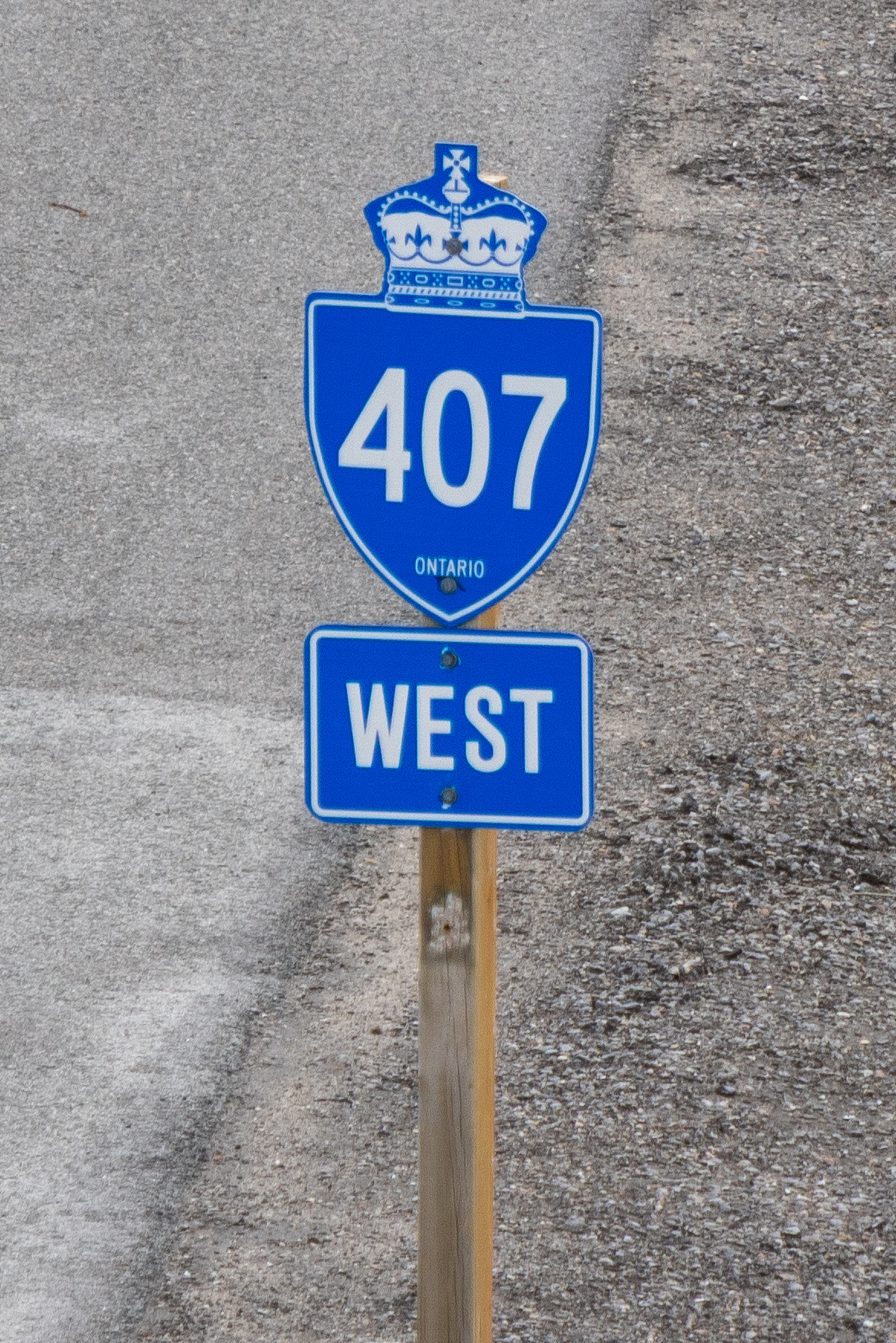
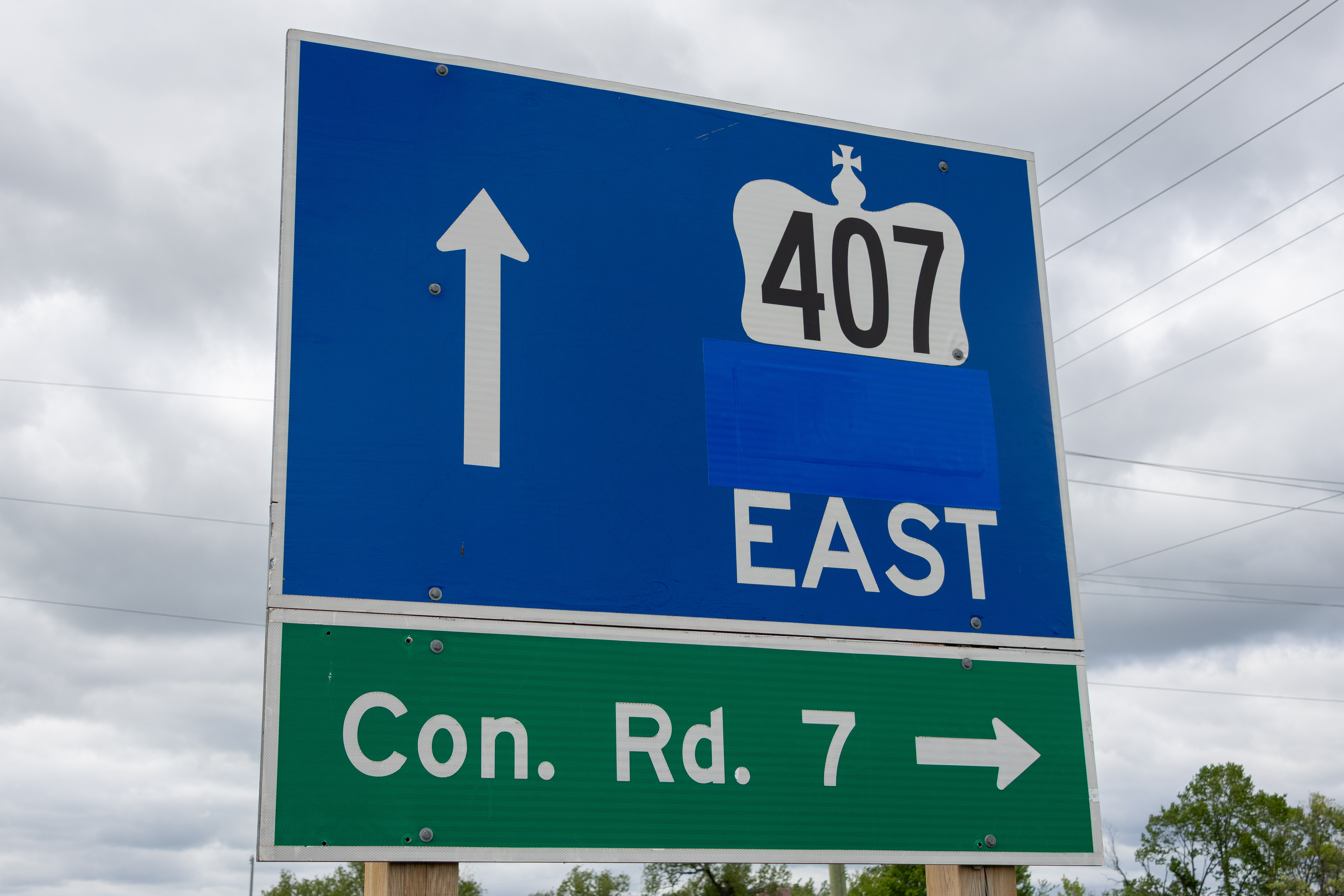
Blue Highway 407 East Shield with toll tab removed in Clarington (left), and a patched-over blue Highway 407 sign indicating the removal of tolls (right). The blue shields and signage will likely be replaced with standard white and green versions respectively.

Shield with former toll tab

To compensate for opening delays, tolling of both the Highway 407 extension and Highway 412 did not commence until February 2017. The tolls also applied to Highway 418 when first opened in December 2019. On April 5, 2022, Highways 412 and 418 became toll-free, but the tolls on the 407 East Extension remained. On June 1, 2025, following a promise made during the 2025 Ontario general election, the provincially operated section of Highway 407 became toll-free. The following tolls show what drivers were charged prior to removal:

Time period	Duty class		
Time period	Light	Heavy	Heavy Multi-unit
Peak (weekdays) (6am–10am and 3pm–7pm)	29.66 ¢/km	59.32 ¢/km	88.97 ¢/km
Midday (weekdays) (10am–3pm)	23.52 ¢/km	47.04 ¢/km	70.57 ¢/km
Midday (weekends & holidays) (11am–7pm)	22.50 ¢/km	45.00 ¢/km	67.50 ¢/km
Off-peak (weekdays) (7pm–6am)	19.43 ¢/km	38.86 ¢/km	58.29 ¢/km
Off-peak (weekends & holidays) (7pm–11am)	19.43 ¢/km	38.86 ¢/km	58.29 ¢/km

- All end times displayed were rounded up to the nearest minute for simplicity (i.e. 06:00 is actually 5:59:59)
- The toll rate that applied to a specific trip was determined by the time a vehicle entered the highway.
- Heavy goods vehicles and lorries were assessed a minimum toll regardless of the length of their trip: $3.00 off peak, $5.00 during peak hours.
- As seen above, the cost of using the provincially owned tollways was less than that of using the 407 ETR.
- Light vehicles without transponders may have been assessed an additional video toll.
- Vehicles weighing over 5,000 kilograms were divided into two categories: Heavy Single Units and Heavy Multiple Units. Heavy Multiple Unit Vehicles were charged two or three times the passenger rate, depending on vehicle size.
- All Heavy Unit vehicles were legally required to have transponders in order to use the highways; offenders may have been penalized under the Highway Traffic Act.

== Financial ==
=== Lease ownership ===
As of September 2024, and unchanged since 2019, ownership of the 407 ETR Concession Company Limited ("407 ETR"), the operator and manager of the highway, is as follows:

- Indirectly owned subsidiaries of Canada Pension Plan Investment Board (CPPIB): 50.01%
- Cintra Global S.E., a subsidiary of Spanish firm Ferrovial S.A.: 43.23%
- AtkinsRéalis Canada Inc.: 6.76%

In March 2025, AtkinsRéalis sold their remaining share of the highway to both Cintra and CPPIB. CPPIB then sold a portion of their share to the Public Sector Pension Investment Board, bringing the ownership totals to as follows:

- Cintra Global S.E., a subsidiary of Spanish firm Ferrovial S.A.: 48.29%
- Indirectly owned subsidiaries of Canada Pension Plan Investment Board: 44.20%
- Public Sector Pension Investment Board: 7.51%

=== Revenue and profit ===
The concession has been called a "cash cow" for AtkinsRéalis (then known as SNC-Lavalin), while local media has commented on the "huge jump" or "soar" in profits.

Income 407
Year	Revenue (millions)	Net Income (millions)	Annual Net income increase (decrease)	Interest expense (millions)	Dividends paid (millions)	Cumulative Dividends paid (millions)	Long-term debt outstanding (millions)	Approx Average interest rate on long-term debt	Net long-term debt added (issued - repaid in millions)	Dividend payout ratio	EBIT (millions)	Times interest earned (Interest Coverage Ratio)	Expenses (millions)	Operating Expenses (millions)
1999	$112	($50.5)		$110			$2,890		$2,811		$51	0.5	61.1	40.7
2000	$189.5	($87.3)		$166			$3,356	6.6%	$450		$91	0.5	98.9	64.2
2001	$244	($96.5)		$197	$0		$3,663	6.3%	$656.8		$127	0.6	117.4	69.3
2002	$311	($99.1)		$252	$48.5		$3,556	6.3%	($0.2)		$159	0.6	151.6	103.5
2003	$343.3	($75.2)		$268	$55.3	$103.8	$3,923	6.2%	$72		$187	0.7	162.8	109.9
2004	$383	($86.7)		$310	$62.9	$166.7	$4,268	5.8%	$236		$223	0.7	160.4	105.8
2005	$420.2	($27.5)		$287	$85	$251.7	$4,347	5.8%	($6.4)		$261	0.9	158.9	104.0
2006	$455.7	$48.5		$247	$145	$397	$4,477	6.0%	$98	276%	$290	1.2	165.3	103.0
2007	$519	$60.3	24%	$282	$120	$517	$4,594	5.2%	$113	199%	$339	1.2	179.9	111.3
2008	$546.5	$119	97%	$234	$135	$652	$4,681	5.6%	$67	113%	$342	1.5	204.2	132.2
2009	$560	$58.2	(49%)	$372	$190	$842	$4,103	5.4%	$92	326%	$383	1.0	177.4	116
2010	$624	$77	32%	$333	$300	$1,142	$5,255	5.4%	$317	389%	$443	1.3	181.1	124.2
2011	$675	$128.3	67%	$335	$460	$1,602	$5,365	5.2%	$41.7	358%	$495	1.5	179.6	121.2
2012	$734	$174.4	36%	$314	$600	$2,202	$5,773	5.0%	$390	344%	$548	1.7	186.4	125.8
2013	$801	$248.7	43%	$273	$690	$2,892	$6,204	5.0%	$460	277%	$602	2.2	199	136.4
2014	$887	$222.9	(10%)	$365	$730	$3,622	$6,799	4.8%	$552	327%	$657	1.8	230.3	151.9
2015	$980	$311.2	39%	$336	$750	$4,372	$7,133	4.7%	$336.7	241%	$732	2.2	248.2	162.2
2016	$1,101.5	$372.9	20%	$383	$790	$5,162	$7,735	4.5%	$570.8	211%	$847	2.2	254.6	149.7
2017	$1,267.7	$470.1	26%	$372	$845	$5,607	$8,298	4.5%	$558	180%	$998	2.7	269.7	163.9 f>
2018	$1,390.3	$539.0	14%	$390	$920	$6,927	$8,368	4.5%	$66	170%	$1,103	2.8	287	179.7
2019	$1,505.3	$575.7	7%	$445	$1,050	$7,977	$8,913	4.4%	$512	182%	$1,204	2.7	301.7	196.2
2020	$908.6	$148.0	(74%)	$457	$563	$8,540	$9,627	4.1%	$705.4	380%	$643	1.4	266.1	168.7
2021	$1,023.1	$212.4	44%	$470	$600	$9,140	$9,681	4.1%	($14.2)	282%	$757	1.6	266.3	164.1
2022	$1,327.2	$435.3	105%	$470	$750	$9,890	$10,092	4.1%	$359.8	172%	$1,039	2.2	288.4	188.4
2023	$1,495.5	$567.3	30%	$473	$950	$10,840	$10,316		$286					
2024	$1,705.2	$692.2	22%	$463.7	$1100	$11,940	$11,103		$286					
Total	$20,510	$4,938		$7,971	$11,940	N/A	N/A	N/A	$11,103	242%	N/A	N/A	N/A	N/A

=== Market valuation ===
The highway's initial construction cost was pegged at $1.5 billion. The toll concession was sold for $3.1 billion.

In 1998, MPP E. J. Douglas Rollins claimed that the province had as much as $104 billion invested in the highway.

On October 5, 2010, the Canada Pension Plan announced that an agreement had been reached with the highway's owners to purchase a 10% stake for $894 million. This implied a value of close to $9 billion for the highway in its then-current state.

In April 2019, SNC-Lavalin Group Inc. announced the sale of a 10.01% share of the highway to the Ontario Municipal Employees Retirement System (OMERS) for $3.25 billion, implying a $32.5 billion valuation of the highway. After the sale, SNC-Lavalin would own only 6.76% of the highway. In August 2019, a court approved the sale of SNC-Lavalin's 10% stake to CPPIB instead of to OMERS.

In March 2025, AtkinsRéalis sold their remaining 6.76% share for $2.79 billion, giving the entire highway a valuation of $41.27 billion.

== History ==
=== Planning and initial construction ===
Although the construction of Highway 407 did not begin until 1987, planning for the bypass of Highway 401 north of Toronto began in the late 1950s. Concepts for the new "dual highway" first appeared in the 1959 plan for Metropolitan Toronto. The land adjacent to several hydro corridors was acquired for the future freeway in the 1960s, but sat vacant as the Ontario Department of Highway (predecessor to the Ministry of Transportation of Ontario (MTO)) opted instead to widen Highway 401 to a twelve-lane collector-express system. The Highway 401 expansion project was considered a success and construction of Highway 407 was shelved for almost thirty years. The plan was revisited in the mid-1980s as congestion in Toronto pushed roads beyond capacity. In 1986, Premier David Peterson was given a helicopter tour of the city during rush-hour; construction of the highway was announced soon thereafter, and began in 1987.

The Ontario government's normal process for highway construction was not desirable given the financial constraints of the recession of the early 1990s. The Rae government sought out private sector partnerships and acquired innovative electronic tolling technology. This met the interests of shippers for improved reliability for just-in-time deliveries such as parts for auto plants while simultaneously implementing the polluter pay principal. To address equity concerns, the NDP government announced a policy of only allowing tolls on roads where there was an alternative free route.

Two firms bid on the public-private project, with the Canadian Highways International Corporation being selected as the operator of the highway. This arrangement allowed for the construction to be accelerated, creating jobs during the recession. The PPP contracting also enabled design modifications that reduced construction costs while maintaining safety standards. Retrofitting toll booths into already designed and constructed interchanges threatened the viability of the plan. The innovative use of automated cameras to read license plates overcame this challenge, and along with transponders for regular users avoided driver delays and provided increased convenience. This resulted in the 407 becoming "the world's first all-electronic, barrier-free toll highway". Financing for the highway was to be paid by user tolls lasting 35 years, after which it would return to the provincial system as a toll-free 400-series highway. The Rae government announced on March 31, 1995, that the corridor reserved for Highway 403 between Burlington and Oakville would instead be built as a western extension of Highway 407.

The first segment of Highway 407, between Highway 410 and Highway 404, was ceremonially opened to traffic on June 7, 1997; no tolls were charged for a month to allow motorists to test-drive the freeway. Several other sections were well underway at this point. A 13-kilometre (8.1 mi) extension westwards to Highway 401 was opened just months later on December 13, 1997. That section was connected with Highway 403 to the south on September 4, 1998, with a temporary two lane ramp connecting to Trafalgar Road. In the east, an extension to Markham Road, at what was then the southern terminus of Highway 48, was completed in early 1998. However, due to the protest of local residents and officials concerning traffic spill-off (a scenario revisited with the extension to Oshawa), the freeway was opened only as far as McCowan Road on February 18. The short segment from McCowan Road to Markham Road remained closed for over a year, as locals feared the funneling of traffic onto Main Street, which is named "Markham Road" south of the freeway. Both Markham and McCowan Roads were widened to four lanes between Highway 407 and Steeles Avenue at this time. This did not alleviate concerns, but on June 24, 1999, the extension opened to continue protest regardless.

In 2000, the 407 consortium had planned to extend the four lane highway by sixteen kilometres (9.9 mi) eastward from Markham to Brock Road in Pickering by the end of the following year.

The sixteen-kilometre (9.9-mile) segment of Highway 407 from Markham to Brock Road in Pickering opened on August 24, 2001.

=== Privatization and original extensions ===
407 International Inc. / 407 ETR Concession Company Ltd.
- Industry: Highway management/maintenance
- Headquarters: Vaughan, Ontario, Canada
- Key people: Jose Espinosa (CEO since 2025); David McFadden (Chairman of the Board since 2011)
- Owners: Cintra (48.29%); CPP Investment Board (44.20%); PSP Investments (7.51%)

When Mike Harris was elected Premier in 1995 on his platform of the Common Sense Revolution, the Ontario government faced an $11 billion annual deficit and a $100 billion debt. Seeking to balance the books, a number of publicly owned services were privatized over the following years. Although initially spared, Highway 407 was privatized quickly in the year leading up to the 1999 provincial elections. It was leased to a conglomerate of private companies for $3.1 billion. The Ontario-based corporation, known as 407 International Inc., was initially owned by the Spanish multinational Ferrovial through its subsidiary Cintra Infraestructuras (61.3%), the Montreal-based engineering firm SNC-Lavalin (22.6%), and CDP Capital (16.1%). The 99-year lease agreement granted the consortium unlimited control over the highway and its tolls, dependent on traffic volume; however, the government maintains the right to build a transport system within the highway right-of-way. The highway has since been described as a "value generating monster" and "cash cow" for SNC-Lavalin and one of the "worst financial missteps" by any government in Ontario's history.

When purchased, the highway travelled from the junction of Highway 403 in Mississauga to Markham Road in Markham. Extensions westward to the QEW and eastward to Highway 7 and Brock Road in Pickering were constructed by the corporation, as mandated in the lease agreement. The western extension, from Highway 403 southwest to the QEW, was not part of the original Highway 407 concept in 1987; rather, the corridor was originally intended to connect the Hamilton and Mississauga sections of Highway 403. Highway 407 was originally slated to assume the temporary routing for Highway 403 along the Mississauga-Oakville boundary to end at the QEW. However, the Bob Rae led Ontario government altered these plans in 1995, and the corporation constructed this section quickly upon obtaining the lease. Sections opened throughout the middle of 2001: between Neyagawa Boulevard and Highway 403 on June 17; between Bronte Road and Neyagawa Boulevard on June 29; between Dundas Street and Bronte Road on July 18; and between the Freeman Interchange and Dundas Street on July 30. In the east, a final extension between Markham Road and Highway 7 opened a month later on August 30.

=== Highway 407 East project ===
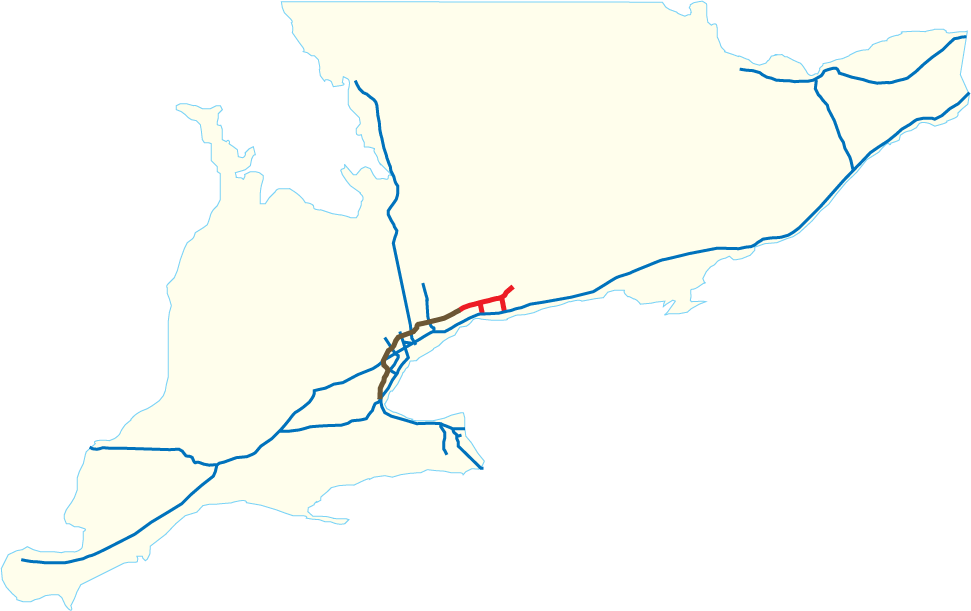
Routing of the 407 East project, including two north–south connector freeways in Durham Region, as part of the eastern extension.

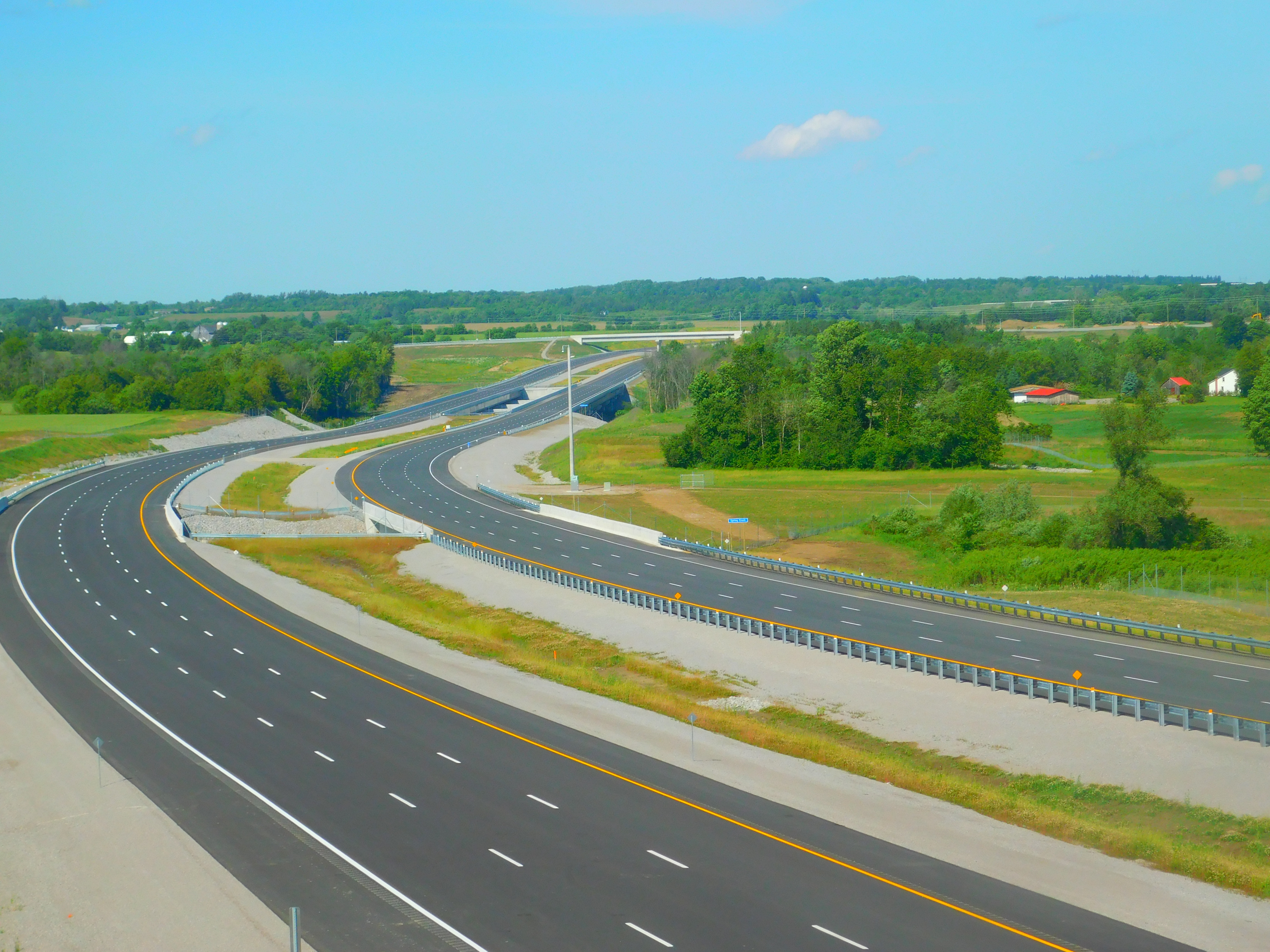
ON 407's extension in June 2016, before its opening.

A provincially operated 65-kilometre (40 mi) long extension to the 407 ETR, known as Highway 407 East (or 407E) during planning, began construction in 2012, with the project undertaken in two separate phases. Phase 1 was opened on June 20, 2016, consisting of a 22-kilometre (14 mi) extension to Harmony Road in Oshawa, as well as the 10-kilometre (6.2 mi) Highway 412. The extension was free of tolls until February 1, 2017. Phase 2A, which opened on January 2, 2018, added a 9.6-kilometre (6.0 mi) extension to Taunton Road at the future Highway 418 interchange. Phase 2B, which opened on December 9, 2019, added a 23.3-kilometre (14.5 mi) extension to Highway 35 and Highway 115, as well as the 12.8-kilometre (8.0 mi) Highway 418.

An environmental assessment (EA) to analyze the proposed extension was undertaken in the early 2000s. The assessment also included studies of the two north–south connectors. A preferred route was announced in June 2007, and the EA was completed in June 2009. On March 6, 2007, as part of the FLOW initiative, the Government of Canada and the Province of Ontario confirmed the extension of the 407 to Highway 35 and Highway 115 in the Municipality of Clarington, including the connector highways, with an announced completion date of 2013. On January 27, 2009, the provincial government announced that the extension would be a tolled highway but owned by the province and with tolls set by the province. The announcement also indicated that the province expected to issue a Request for Proposals later in the year. The contract, which is valued at $1.6 billion and includes construction and operation of the highway, was eventually awarded to the same consortium that owns 407 ETR.

A bridge under construction along Highway 7 west of Brooklin in 2012; this was the first project along the new extension.

On June 9, 2010, the MTO approved the extension as far east as Simcoe Street in Oshawa, announcing plans to phase construction of the extension. Local residents and politicians rejected the plan, as had happened with the section between McCowan Road and Markham Road. A motion was proposed in the Ontario Legislature to build the full extension in one project, but failed to pass. Instead, a compromise was issued on March 10, 2011: the first phase would extend Highway 407 to Harmony Road in Oshawa by 2015, including Highway 412; the second phase would then complete the extension to Highway 35 / 115 by 2020, including Highway 418. This timeline was confirmed by Premier Dalton McGuinty on May 24, 2012, and construction began in the first quarter of 2013.

In early December 2015, it was announced that contractor delays would push the opening of the first phase from December 18 to the spring of 2016. The extension did not open until the morning of June 20, 2016, in the last hours of Spring 2016.

On December 9, 2019, the final portion of the 407 East Extension, as well as Ontario Highway 418, both opened to traffic, marking the end of the 407 East project. The final portion was originally projected to be completed in 2020. Unlike when the extension originally opened, tolling started immediately on the final portion. The highway now extends east to Ontario Highway 115, providing more options for people living in and around Peterborough to get into Toronto and the western part of the Greater Toronto Area.

=== Since completion ===
Between 2018 and 2019, Highway 407 was widened between Markham Road and Brock Road. The first project, widening the highway to 6 lanes between York-Durham Line and Brock Road, began in Spring 2018 and was completed in August 2018. The second project, which widened the highway to 8 lanes between Markham Road and York-Durham Line, was completed in September 2019.

In the Progressive Conservative Party of Ontario's 2025 re-election campaign, Premier Doug Ford stated that a re-elected Progressive Conservative government would remove tolls from the provincially-owned portion of the highway. Tolls were subsequently removed on June 1, 2025, as part of the spring budget.

There are currently plans for multiple new interchanges, as well as reconstruction of the ramps with route 401 to serve route 413. The government of Ontario is also considering widening of the toll-free section, Hwy. 407 East.

== Controversies ==
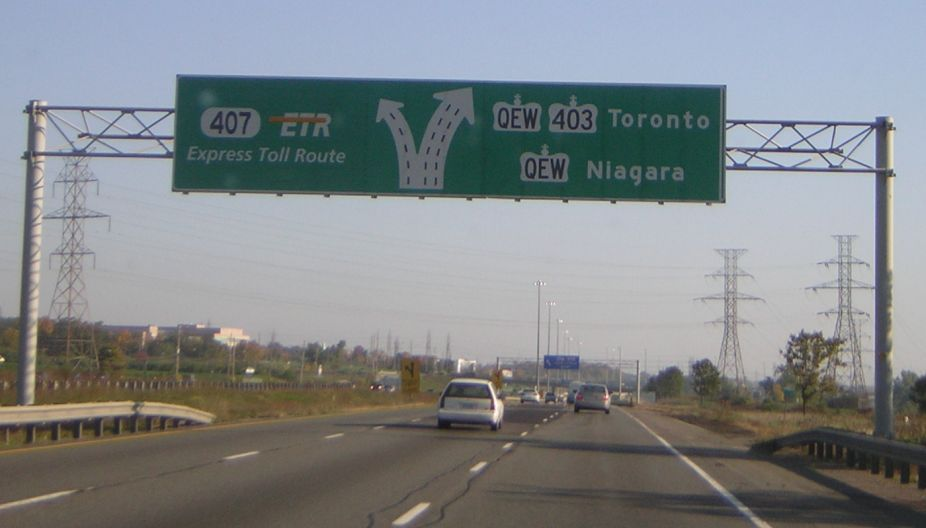
Signage on eastbound Highway 403 in Burlington approaching the Freeman Interchange, where motorists wanting to take 407 ETR must exit to the left. This can potentially cause problems for drivers, such as weaving across traffic to avoid exiting and being billed for accidentally driving on the highway.

Highway 407 ETR has been the subject of several controversies over its two decades of existence.

=== Privatization ===
The privatization of the road, the toll rate increases, and the 99-year lease period have been widely criticized.

- The original plan was for the tolls to end after the construction cost was paid off, probably after about 35 years; there is no indication that the private owners will eliminate the tolls.
- Although Premier Mike Harris promised that tolls would not rise by more than 30 percent, they have risen by over 200 percent by 2015, from about 10 cents to over 30 cents per kilometre.
- There have been criticisms and lawsuits arising from plate denial issues.
- Another criticism is that taxpayers did not receive a fair price for the highway: In 2002, just three years after the original sale for C$3.1 billion, Macquarie Infrastructure Group, an Australian investment firm, estimated that the highway was worth four times the original price. By 2019, the estimated value had risen to C$30 billion.
- Both the length of the lease agreement and the fact that the road is controlled by private corporations mean that decisions about the road and the tolls are made with less accountability to the public. The Harris government failed to put any restrictions on toll increases (as long as the road attracted a certain volume of cars). As a result, commuters in the densely populated GTA will have no protection against rising tolls on the highway for the entire 99-year term of the lease.

=== Safety concerns and PEO report ===
Cost-saving measures and ensuing safety concerns resulted in an independent Ontario Provincial Police investigation shortly before the opening of the freeway. An expert panel of engineers, assembled by the Professional Engineers Ontario, released a report outlining concerns regarding the decreased loop ramp radii and the lack of protective guardrails along sharp curves, in addition to the lack of a concrete median barrier to separate the two travel directions. However, it was also argued that the large grass median was sufficient to prevent crossover collisions, given that Highway 410 has a similar median.

=== Toll rate approval ===
The Ontario provincial government has quarrelled with 407 ETR over toll rates and customer service but is largely tied down by the lease contract. On February 2, 2004, the government notified 407 ETR that it was considered to be in default of the contract because of 407 ETR's decision to raise toll rates without first obtaining provincial clearance. The court's initial decision sided with 407 ETR: on July 10, 2004, an independent arbitrator affirmed that 407 ETR has the power to raise toll rates without first consulting the government. The government filed an appeal of this decision but was overruled by an Ontario Superior Court decision released on January 6, 2005; however, a subsequent ruling by the Ontario Court of Appeal on June 13, 2005, granted the government permission to appeal the decision.

Around the same time, the government also faced off against 407 ETR in court regarding plate denial.

Members of the public have accused the 407 ETR of predatory billing practices, including false billing and continued plate denial after bankruptcy. In 2016, after a four-year legal battle, consumers won an $8 million class action lawsuit.

=== Comparative toll rates ===
The 407 ETR and Cobequid Pass Toll Highway (Trans Canada Highway in Nova Scotia) are the only two toll highways (not counting toll bridges on highways) in Canada.

Some other toll rates are:

- New York State Niagara Thruway, exit 1 to exit 20B, approx. 30 km, US$1 cash, about C$1.33, or about $0.044 per km (2019)
- Cobequid Pass Toll Highway in Nova Scotia, flat rate $4 cash, for approximately 25 km of highway, or about $0.16 per km (2019)
- Chicago Skyway $0.28 per km (2012)
- Fort Bend Parkway Toll Road in Texas $0.13 per km (2012)
- I-25 HOV Express Lanes in Colorado $0.357 per km (2012)

== Future ==
The planned community of Seaton in north Pickering is currently under development with the release of development lands in Durham north of the Gatineau Hydro Corridor and west of Brock Road. This development originally included the proposed Pickering Airport, which was slated for construction in 2020 after decades of delays; however, in January 2025, the Federal Government officially cancelled all plans for the Pickering Airport. Interchanges with future extensions of Peter Matthews Drive (at the current North Road overpass, near Whitevale) and Whites Road (currently Sideline 26) will be built as part of the large road network planned for the development.

== Exit list ==
The following table lists the major junctions along Highway 407, as noted by the 407 ETR Concession Company Limited.

Division	Location	km	mi	Exit	Destinations	Notes
Halton	Burlington	0.0– 1.1	0.0– 0.68	—	Highway 403 west – Hamilton, Brantford	407 ETR western terminus; Highway 403 exit 80; westbound exit and eastbound entrance
Halton	Burlington	0.0– 1.1	0.0– 0.68	1	Queen Elizabeth Way – Niagara-on-the-Lake	Toronto-bound exit and Fort Erie-bound entrance; QEW exit 100
Halton	Burlington	0.0– 1.1	0.0– 0.68	1	Fairview Street, Plains Road	Westbound exit and eastbound entrance; Toronto-bound exit and Fort Erie-bound entrance from Queen Elizabeth Way; eastbound exit and westbound entrance from Highway 403
Halton	Burlington	6.0	3.7	5	Regional Road 5 (Dundas Street)	Formerly Highway 5
Halton	Burlington	9.9	6.2	9	Regional Road 20 (Appleby Line)	
Halton	Oakville	14.0	8.7	13	Regional Road 25 (Bronte Road) – Oakville, Milton	Formerly Highway 25; to Oakville Trafalgar Memorial Hospital
Halton	Oakville	18.9	11.7	18	Regional Road 4 (Neyagawa Boulevard)	
Halton	Oakville	22.2	13.8	21	Regional Road 3 (Trafalgar Road) – Oakville, Halton Hills	
Halton–Peel boundary	Milton–Mississauga boundary	24.8	15.4	24	Highway 403 – Hamilton, Toronto	Highway 403 exit 109
Halton–Peel boundary	Milton–Mississauga boundary	28.8	17.9	28	Halton Regional Road 6 west / Peel Regional Road 3 east (Britannia Road)	
Halton–Peel boundary	Milton–Mississauga boundary	31.9	19.8	31	Halton Regional Road 7 west / Peel Regional Road 5 east (Derry Road)	
Halton–Peel boundary	Milton–Mississauga–Halton Hills tripoint	33.9– 35.8	21.1– 22.2	34	Highway 401 – Toronto, London	Signed as exits 34A (east) and 34B (west) eastbound; no access from westbound Highway 407 to eastbound Highway 401 or westbound Highway 401 to eastbound Highway 407; Highway 401 exit 330
Halton–Peel boundary	Milton–Mississauga–Halton Hills tripoint	33.9– 35.8	21.1– 22.2		Highway 413	Possible interchange location for proposed freeway; connection to be incorporated into the Highway 401 interchange complex.
Peel	Brampton	39.7	24.7	39	Regional Road 1 (Mississauga Road)	
Peel	Brampton	42.9	26.7	42	Regional Road 18 (Mavis Road)	
Peel	Brampton	45.2	28.1	44	Hurontario Street	Formerly Highway 10
Peel	Brampton	47.3	29.4	46	Highway 410	Highway 410 exit 5
Peel	Brampton	49.6	30.8	48	Regional Road 4 (Dixie Road)	
Peel	Brampton	51.1	31.8	50	Bramalea Road	Westbound exit and eastbound entrance
Peel	Brampton	54.2	33.7	53	Regional Road 7 (Airport Road)	
Peel	Brampton	55.7	34.6	54	Goreway Drive	Westbound exit and eastbound entrance
York	Vaughan	58.9	36.6	58	Highway 427	Highway 427 exit 19; to Pearson International Airport
York	Vaughan	60.2	37.4	59	Regional Road 27 (Highway 27)	Formerly Highway 27
York	Vaughan	64.2	39.9	63	Regional Road 57 (Pine Valley Drive)	Changeable message sign eastbound prior to overpass
York	Vaughan	66.4	41.3	65	Regional Road 56 (Weston Road)	Eastbound exit and westbound entrance
York	Vaughan	67.1	41.7	66	Highway 400 – Toronto, Barrie	No access to Regional Road 7 (Highway 7) or Regional Road 72 (Langstaff Road) via Highway 400; Highway 400 exits 26 (northbound) and 28 (southbound)
York	Vaughan	68.3	42.4	67	Regional Road 55 (Jane Street)	No access to/from Highway 400
York	Vaughan	70.5	43.8	69	Regional Road 6 (Keele Street)	
York	Vaughan	74.0	46.0	73	Regional Road 53 (Dufferin Street)	
York	Vaughan	76.2	47.3	75	Regional Road 38 (Bathurst Street)	
York	Richmond Hill–Markham–Vaughan tripoint	78.4	48.7	77	Regional Road 1 (Yonge Street)	Formerly Highway 11
York	Markham	80.3	49.9	79	Regional Road 34 (Bayview Avenue)	Changeable message sign eastbound prior to overpass
York	Markham	82.4	51.2	81	Regional Road 12 (Leslie Street)	Eastbound exit and westbound entrance
York	Markham	83.4	51.8	83	Highway 404 – Toronto, Newmarket	No access to Regional Road 7 (Highway 7) via Highway 404; Highway 404 exit 26
York	Markham	84.4	52.4	84	Regional Road 8 (Woodbine Avenue)	
York	Markham	86.5	53.7	86	Regional Road 65 (Warden Avenue)	
York	Markham	88.4	54.9	88	Regional Road 3 (Kennedy Road)	
York	Markham	90.5	56.2	90	Regional Road 67 (McCowan Road)	
York	Markham	92.6	57.5	92	Regional Road 68 (Markham Road)	Formerly Highway 48
York	Markham	94.7	58.8	94	Regional Road 69 (Ninth Line)	New ramps added 2009 - Westbound ramp from northbound Ninth Line. No access to Highway 407 eastbound from Ninth Line northbound, but a ramp is planned to be constructed in 2032–2041; to Markham Stouffville Hospital
York	Markham	96.4	59.9	95	Regional Road 48 (Donald Cousens Parkway)	No entrance ramps from Donald Cousens Parkway northbound. A ramp from Donald Cousens Parkway Northbound to Highway 407 Eastbound is to be constructed in 2022–2026
York–Durham boundary	Markham–Pickering boundary	99.4	61.8	98	Regional Road 30 (York–Durham Line)	
Durham	Pickering	100.8	62.6	100	Regional Road 28 (Peter Matthews Drive)	Future interchange on existing freeway; currently North Road
Durham	Pickering	102.3	63.6	102	Regional Road 38 (Whites Road)	Opened February 2021. Formerly Sideline 26
Durham	Pickering	106.5	66.2		Regional Road 1 (Brock Road)	At-grade intersection closed late 2015; corresponding segments of Brock Road now Mowbray Street and Elsa Storry Avenue
Durham	Pickering	108.0	67.1	105	Regional Road 1 (Brock Road)	
Durham	Pickering	108.0	67.1	407 ETR ends Highway 407 begins		Eastern limit of privately operated 407 ETR; western limit of provincially operated Highway 407
Durham	Pickering	108.3	67.3		Highway 7 / Sideline 16	At-grade intersection with former Brock Road alignment closed 2015; former eastern terminus of (2001–2016)
Durham	Pickering	111.2	69.1	108	Regional Road 31 (Westney Road)	Future interchange on existing freeway
Durham	Pickering	112.9	70.2	109	Salem Road	Future interchange on existing freeway. Currently eastbound off/on ramps used by service vehicles only to maintenance facility with no access to Salem Road.
Durham	Pickering–Whitby boundary	115.3	71.6	111	Regional Road 23 (Lake Ridge Road)	
Durham	Whitby	116.2	72.2	112	Via Highway 401 via Highway 412 south	
Durham	Whitby	120.3	74.8	118	Via Highway 7 via Highway 12 north – Orillia; Regional Highway 12 south	
Durham	Whitby	121.8	75.7	120	Regional Road 26 (Thickson Road)	
Durham	Oshawa	123.6	76.8	122	Thornton Road	Future interchange on existing freeway
Durham	Oshawa	125.4	77.9	124	Regional Road 2 (Simcoe Street)	
Durham	Oshawa	128.7	80.0	127	Regional Road 33 (Harmony Road)	Former Eastern Terminus of 407E (Phase One)
Durham	Clarington	133.7	83.1	132	Regional Road 34 (Enfield Road)	Opened January 2, 2018
Durham	Clarington	137.0	85.1	135	Via Highway 401 via Highway 418 south	
Durham	Clarington	138.3	85.9		Regional Road 4 (Taunton Road)	Temporary terminus of Highway 407, from January 2, 2018 to September 2019 (Phase 2A); Phase 2B (2019): Removal of direct 407 access to/from Taunton Road. North–south section of freeway renamed as part of Highway 418.
Durham	Clarington	139.7	86.8	138	Regional Road 57 (Bowmanville Avenue)	Opened on December 9, 2019
Durham	Clarington	146.3	90.9	145	Darlington–Clarke Townline	Opened on December 9, 2019
Durham	Clarington	151.4	94.1	–	Highway 35 / Highway 115 – Peterborough, Kingston	Highway 407 eastern terminus; Highway 115 exit 14; opened on December 9, 2019
1.000 mi = 1.609 km; 1.000 km = 0.621 mi: Closed/former; Proposed; Incomplete access; Route transition; Unopened

== See also ==
- Private highway
- Maryland Route 200, a similar toll road in Maryland, United States.
