= Seaton, Ontario =

Seaton Community
- Planning area
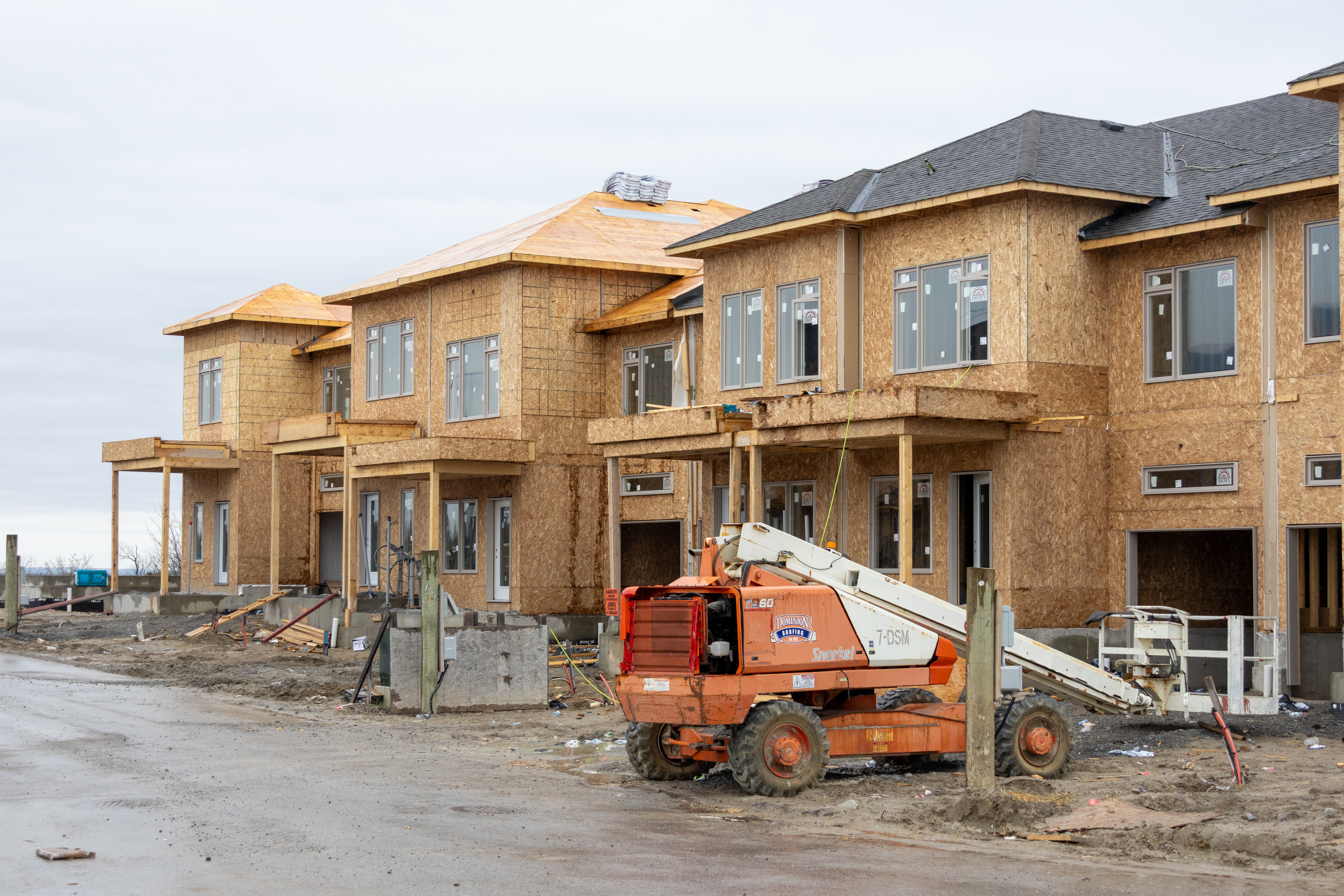
- Housing construction in 2026
- Interactive map of Seaton Community
- Coordinates: 43°53′35″N 79°8′14″W
- Country: Canada
- Province: Ontario
- Regional municipality: Durham
- City: Pickering
- Time zone: UTC-5 (EST)
  - Summer (DST): UTC-4 (EDT)
- Forward sortation area: L1?
- Area codes: 905 and 289

Seaton will be a community in north Pickering in Ontario, Canada. Seaton is bounded by West Duffins Creek to the west, Sideline 16 to the east, Highway 7 to the north, and the CP Rail line to the south; it abuts the communities of Green River, Whitevale, and Brougham. It has been devised by the provincial government since the 1970s. By the time of full build-out, the community is expected to include a population of up to 70,000 people and 35,000 jobs.

== Politics ==
In the early 1970s, the provincial government expropriated and purchased approximately 8,100 hectares of land in north Pickering. These lands, known as the North Pickering Land Assembly, were acquired to develop a community of approximately 250,000. This community was intended to serve the proposed federal international airport, which was to be located just to the north, prior to the project's cancellation in 2025.

The Seaton lands (originally known as Cedarwood), have received much attention from local residents and environmentalists. It was a prominent component of the North Pickering Land Exchange of November 2003 enacted by the Liberal provincial government, in which developers received land in Seaton in exchange for lands owned by those developers on the Oak Ridges Moraine, primarily in Richmond Hill and Uxbridge. Development of the area began near Taunton Road in 2017, as well as at Whites Road and Highway 7 as of 2023.

== Communities ==
Similar to Cornell in the adjacent City of Markham, Seaton will have planned communities built within it. Pickering has named these as:

- Lamoreaux - likely named for Huguenot Loyalist Josue L'Amoreaux (1738–1834) and located near Brock Road and Whitevale Road
- Brock-Taunton
- Mount Pleasant
- Wilson Meadows
- Thompson's Corners
- Pickering Innovation Corridor
