= Ontario Highway 418 =

Tolled 400-series highway in Ontario

Highway 418
- East Durham Link
- Highway 418 highlighted in red

Route information
- Maintained by Ministry of Transportation of Ontario
- Length: 9.2 km (5.7 mi)
- History: Proposed 1990s; Opened on December 9, 2019

Major junctions
- South end: Highway 401 in Clarington
- Regional Highway 2 Regional Road 4
- North end: Highway 407 in Clarington

Location
- Country: Canada
- Province: Ontario

Highway system
- Ontario provincial highways; Current; Former; 400-series
| ← Highway 417 | → Highway 420 |

King's Highway 418, or simply Highway 418, is a controlled-access highway and former tolled highway in the Canadian province of Ontario. The 400-series highway is 9.2 km (5.7 mi) long, travelling through the Regional Municipality of Durham to connect Highway 401 with the eastern extension of Highway 407. The freeway is located entirely within the Municipality of Clarington near Durham Regional Road 34 (Courtice Road).

The route number was confirmed by the Ministry of Transportation of Ontario (MTO) alongside Highway 412 on February 6, 2015. Prior to this, it was known as the East Durham Link. Highway 418 opened on December 9, 2019, alongside the extension of Highway 407 to Highways 35 and 115. On April 5, 2022, Highway 418 became toll-free.

The speed limit is 110 km/h (68 mph). The route is patrolled by the Ontario Provincial Police (OPP) and maintained by the Ministry of Transportation of Ontario (MTO).

== Route description ==
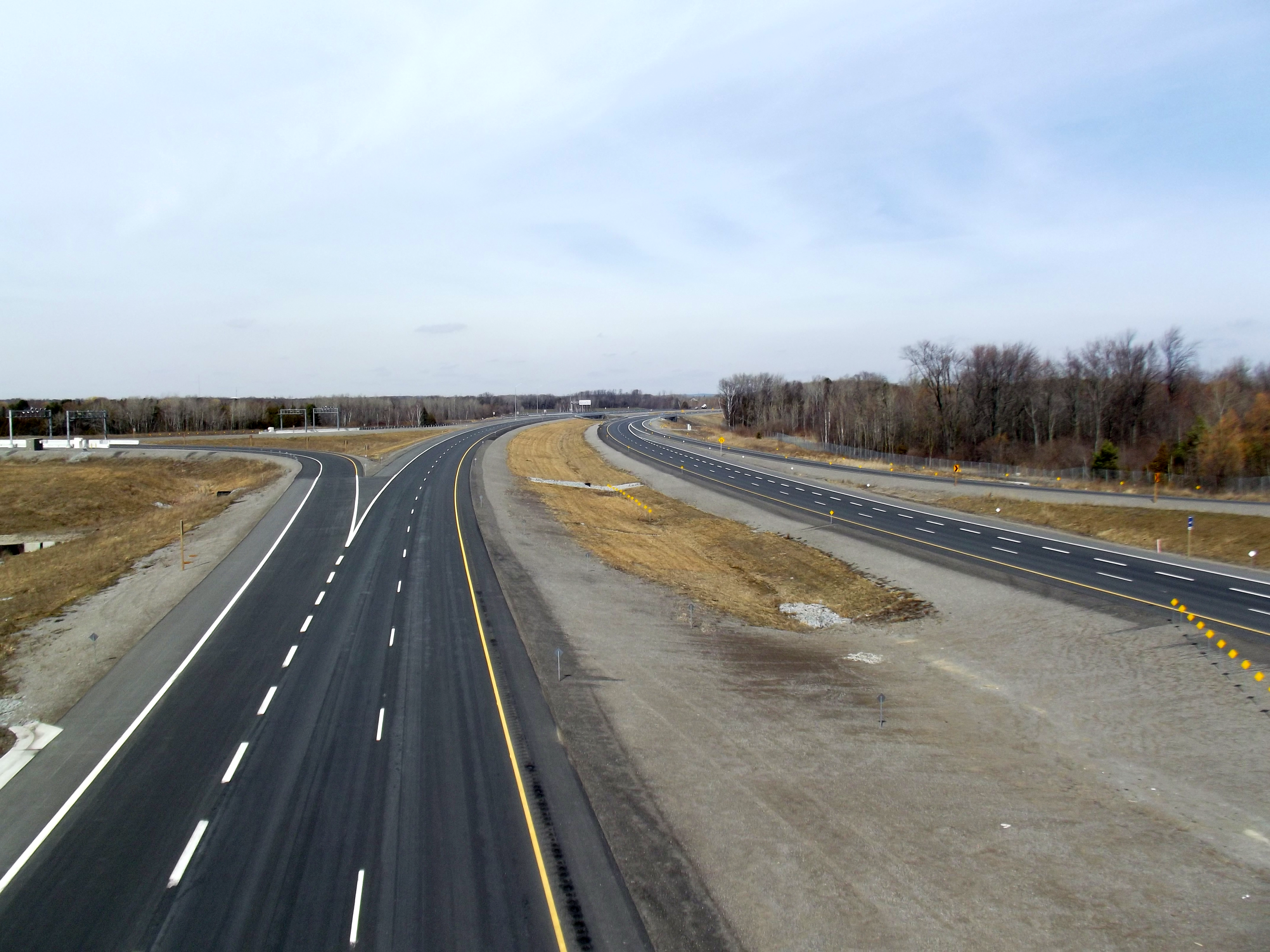
Highway 418 facing north from Durham Regional Highway 2

Highway 418 is a 9.2-kilometre (5.7 mi) four-lane highway extending from Highway 401 to Highway 407. The entire length of the route lies between Hancock Road and Rundle Road, east of Courtice. At the southern end, the route begins at a three-way interchange with Highway 401, from which it proceeds north. It then interchanges with former Highway 2.

North of former Highway 2, the route swerves eastward and crosses Solina Road. Just before a partial interchange with Taunton Road, the highway again swerves slightly eastward to the former alignment of Rundle Road. Immediately north of Taunton Road, the route ends at an interchange with Highway 407, which was a toll route; ETC cameras were present there.

== History ==
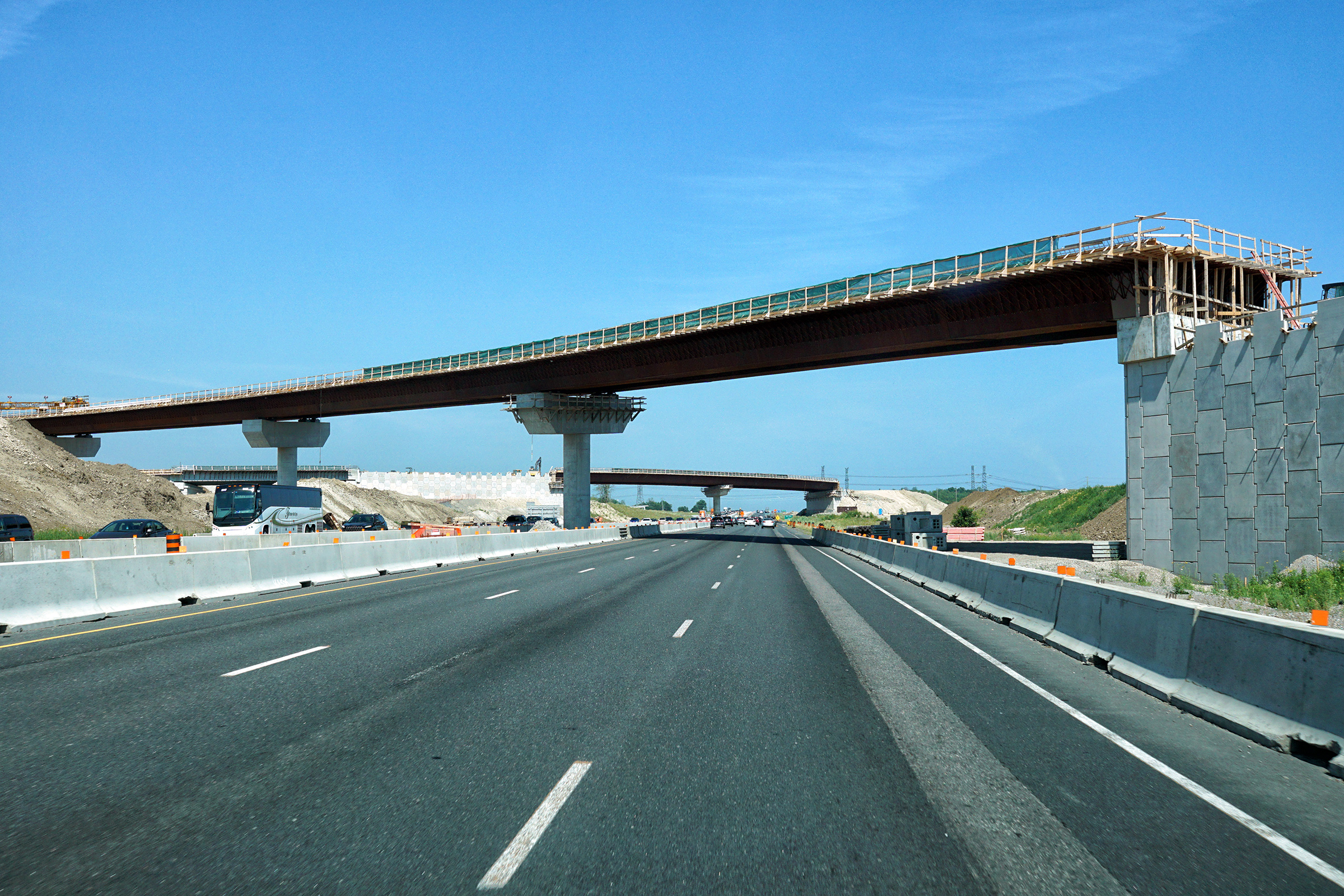
Highway 418 interchange with Highway 401 under construction in 2018

Completed (but not yet open) interchange with Highway 401, facing north, in 2021

Highway 418 is the second of two freeways connecting the eastern extension of Highway 407 with Highway 401; the other is Highway 412, located to the west in Whitby. The two routes, known then as the East Durham Link and West Durham Link, first appeared as part of the June 2007 "Technically Recommended Route", which was submitted as part of the environmental assessment (EA) for the extension, but had been announced earlier that year on March 7 by the Government of Canada as part of an investment in Greater Toronto Area infrastructure. The EA report was released on August 17, 2009, and included detailed plans for the configuration of the interchanges along the new freeway. The report also sought approval for the 6 lanes anticipated to be required by 2031.

On February 6, 2015, it was announced by the MTO that the East Durham Link would be designated Highway 418. On March 23, 2015, a C$1.2 billion contract was awarded for the second phase of the Highway 407 east project, which included construction of Highway 418. It was split into 2 phases, 2A and 2B. Phase 2A, which included the portion of the highway north of Taunton Road, was finished by December 2017 and opened on January 2, 2018. The portion that opened would be temporarily signed as part of Highway 407. The section of Highway 407 east of Enfield Road was temporarily closed on September 9, 2019, to reconfigure the ramps at the Taunton Road interchange in preparation for the opening of the remainder of the highway. The highway fully opened on December 9, 2019.

On February 18, 2022, the Government of Ontario announced that Highway 418 would become toll-free from April 5, 2022, together with Highway 412.

== Tolling ==
Former Highway 418 white-on-blue toll shield with toll tab

Highway 418 used the same electronic tolling system as Highways 407 and 412 and is part of the same provincially tolled section of highway as Highways 412 and 407 East. The toll rate that applied to a specific trip was determined by the time at which a vehicle entered the highway and from 2021 to 2022 ranged from 19 to 30 ¢/km (31 to 48 ¢/mi) for vehicles that weighed less than 5 tonnes (light vehicles). Heavy vehicles (those weighing more than 5 tonnes) were split into two categories: Heavy single units, which were tolled approximately twice the light vehicle rate, and heavy multi-units, which are tolled approximately three times the light vehicle rate. People using the highway may have used the 407 ETR transponders, which are still used throughout Highway 407, and light vehicles paid an additional video toll without a transponder. Heavy vehicles were legally required to have a transponder and may have been charged under the Highway Traffic Act if they did not. There was also a flat toll, which was $1 during off-peak and $2 during peak periods for light vehicles. Highway 418 became permanently free-of-charge on April 5, 2022.

== Exit list ==
The following are the exits listed in the 407 East Environmental Assessment Report. Lengths are approximated with Google Maps. The entire route lies within Clarington in the Regional Municipality of Durham.

| Location | km | mi | Exit | Destinations | Notes |
|---|---|---|---|---|---|
| Clarington | 0.0 | 0.0 | — | Highway 401 – Toronto, Kingston | Highway 401 exit 426 |
| Clarington | 2.8 | 1.7 | 3 | Regional Highway 2 | |
| Clarington | 8.2 | 5.1 | 8 | Regional Road 4 (Taunton Road) | Northbound exit and southbound entrance only |
| Clarington | 9.2 | 5.7 | — | Highway 407 – Toronto, Peterborough | Highway 407 exit 135 |
1.000 mi = 1.609 km; 1.000 km = 0.621 mi: Incomplete access

== Gallery ==
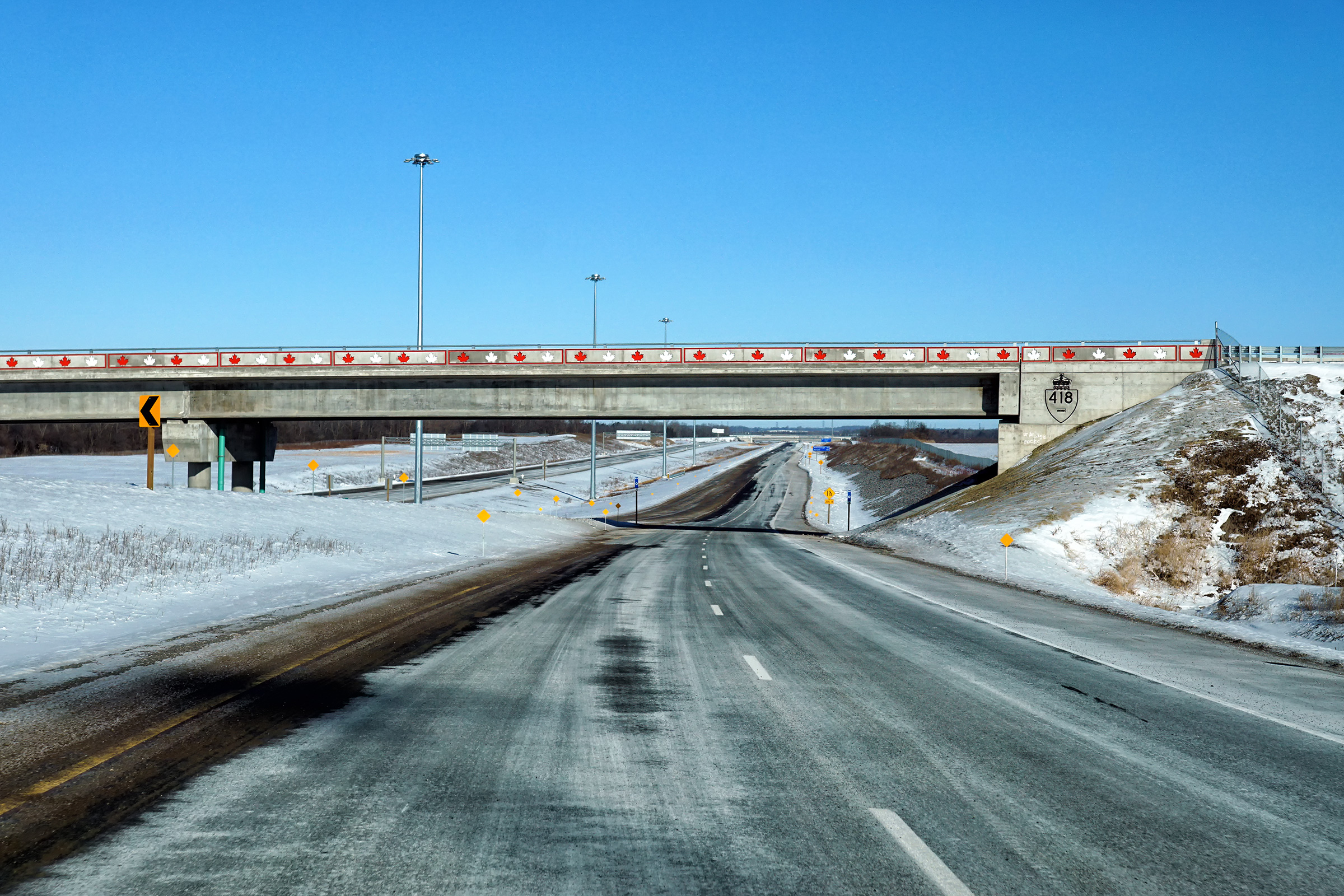
Highway 418 interchange looking north from the ramp from the westbound 401

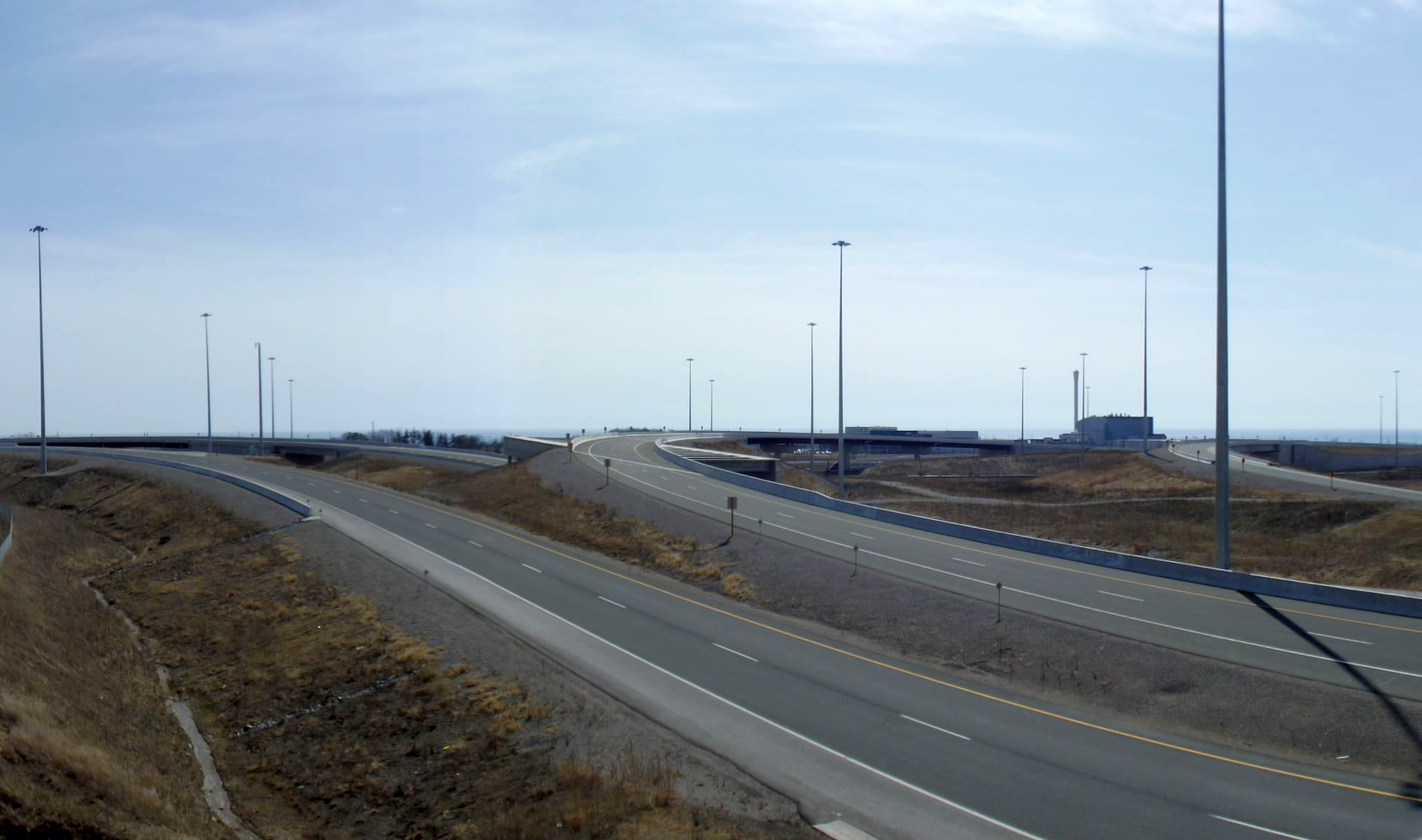
Highway 418 and Highway 401 interchange

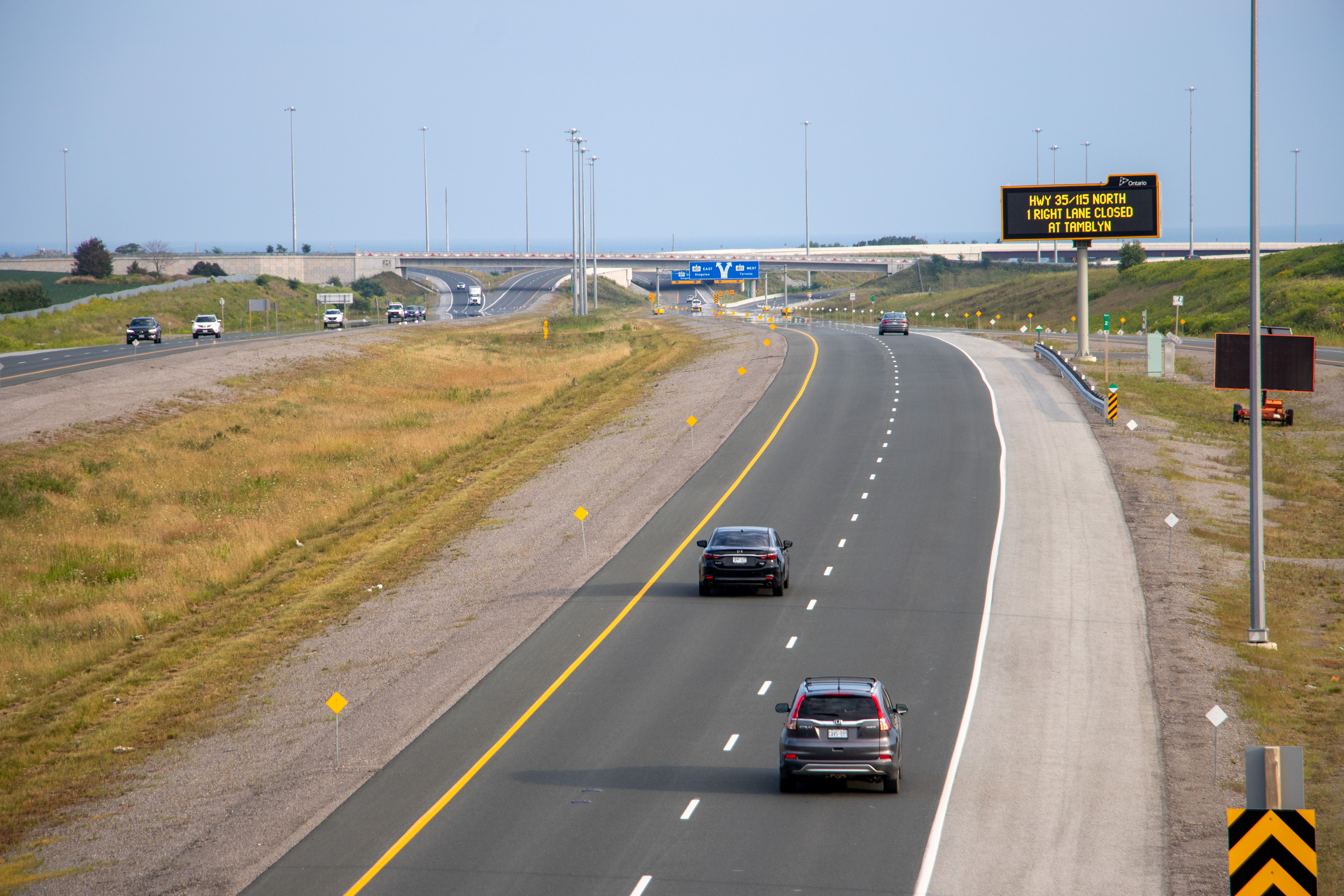
Highway 418 looking south towards Highway 401 interchange at Bloor Street overpass

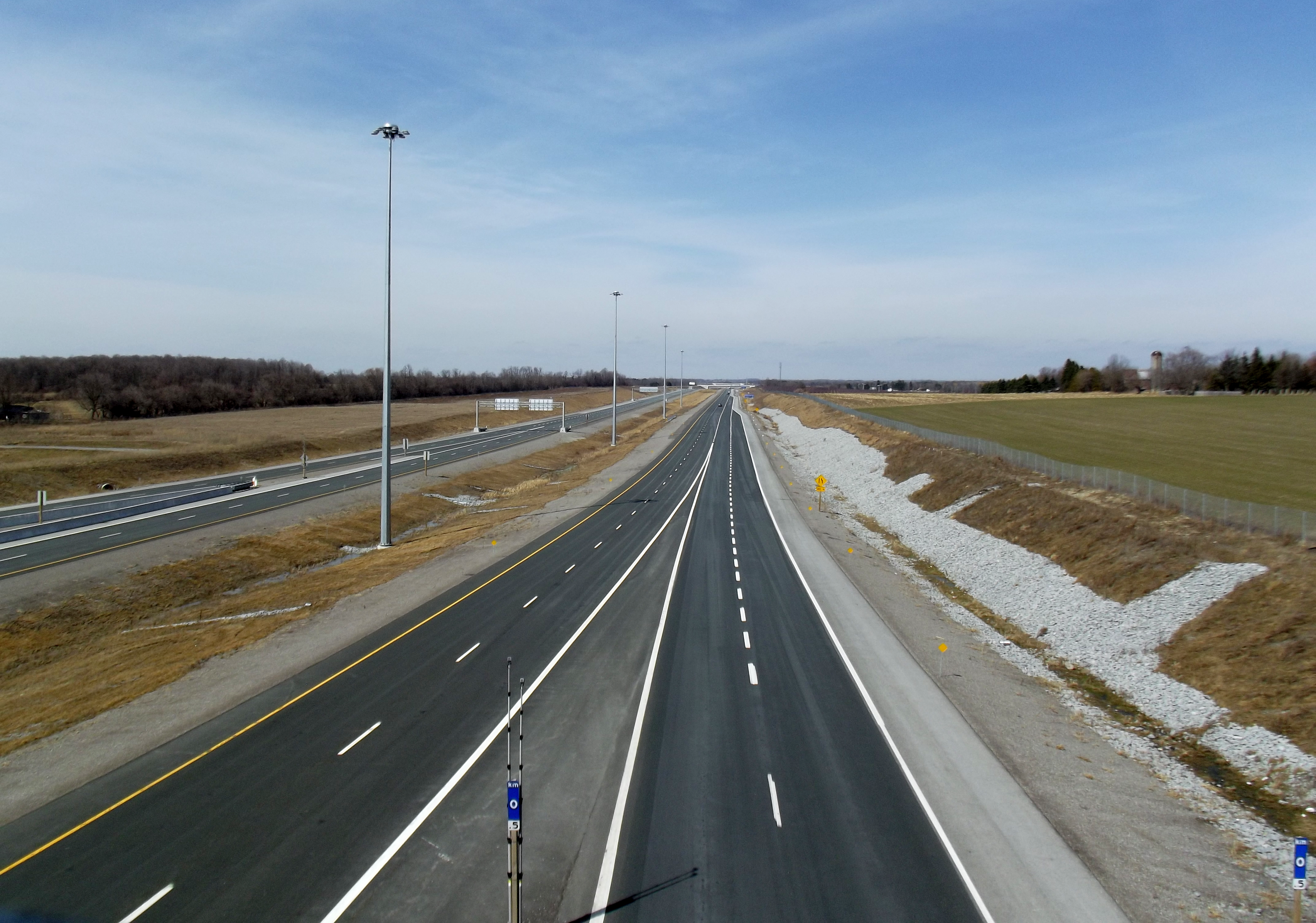
Highway 418 facing north from the Bloor Street overpass
