= Brougham, Ontario =

Brougham
- Unincorporated community
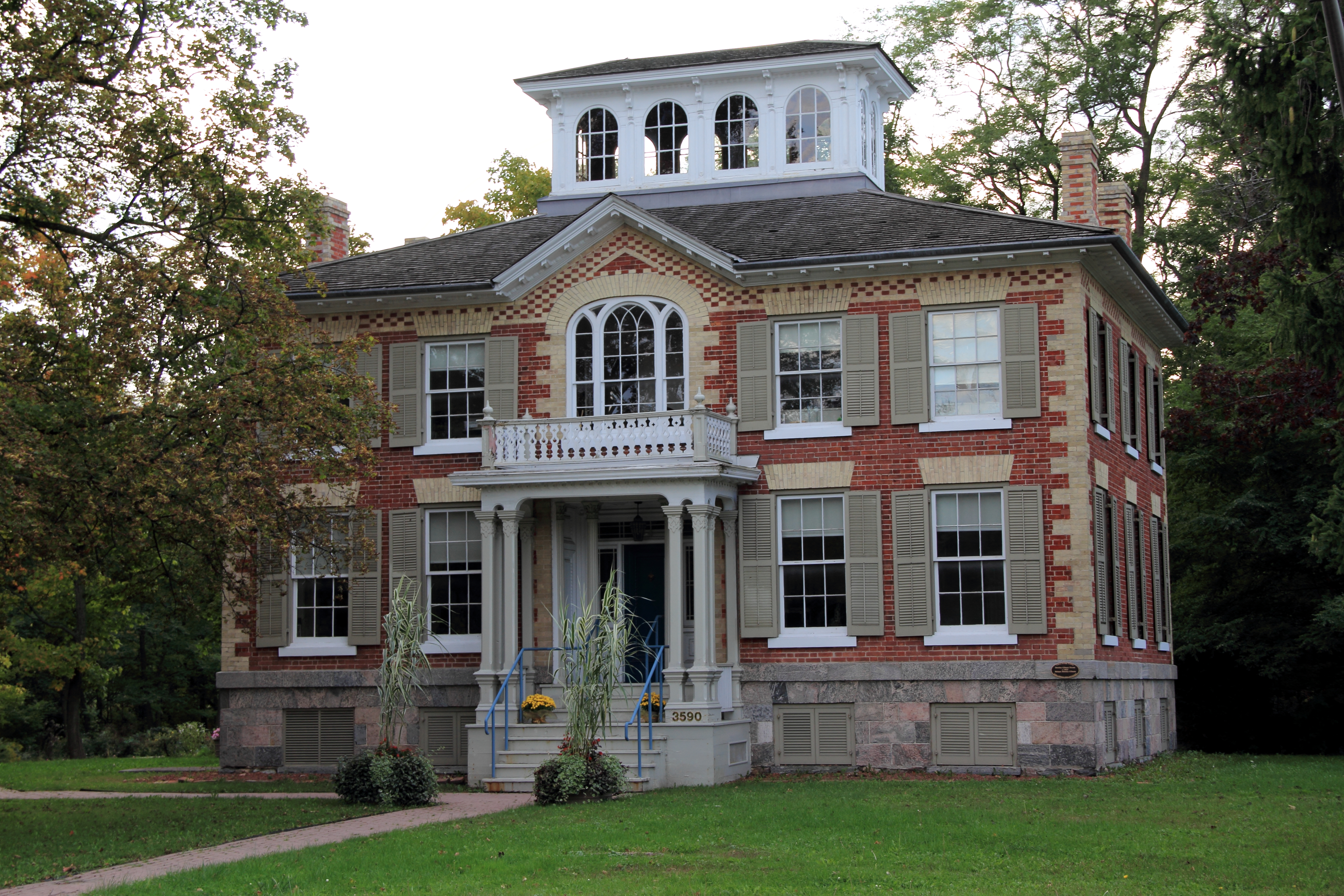
- Benley House, a cultural heritage site in Brougham
- Interactive map of Brougham
- Coordinates: 43°55′6″N 79°6′26″W
- Country: Canada
- Province: Ontario
- Regional municipality: Durham
- City: Pickering
- Time zone: UTC-5 (EST)
  - Summer (DST): UTC-4 (EDT)
- Forward sortation area: L0H 1A0
- Area codes: 905 and 289
- NTS Map: 030M14
- GNBC Code: FALYS

Brougham (/broʊm/ brohm) is a community within the northern part of the City of Pickering, in Durham Region of Ontario, Canada. The Hamlet was expropriated by the federal government in 1972 for a future airport. There are concerns because some of its buildings are of architectural significance. There is one bus in the area; the 52 York University passes through with a stop at Brock Road. The population is about 150. The children go to school at Valley View Public School in its neighbouring town of Greenwood. It has slowly reduced in population and business as the 407 wound its way through in the early 2000s. It currently houses an Antique Restoration, Pickering Animal Shelter, Hot Tub Outlet (was Country Store before 2011) and RV dealership, as well as a handful of historical buildings dating back to the Mackenzie Rebellion. There was a CC Gas Bar, which later became a Suny's Gas Bar near Brock Road and Highway 7. It was a high traffic gas bar, as most drivers traveling from Pickering to Toronto stopped there on their commute. In the past, the hamlet has been home for a Mac's Milk (Formerly Beckers, later as Nonna's Cafe and now home to Pickering Animal Services) as well as a Family Run Hardware Store, a small restaurant as well as a small mechanic shop, most of which closed down in or around the time that the plans for the 407 development came to realization.

The Hamlet of Brougham is now the current site of the Highway 407 ETR/Ontario Highway 7 Bypass as part of the 407 expansion through Eastern Durham Region. At this juncture, the 407 leads from the Hamlet, and runs parallel with Highway 7 until it reaches Bowmanville.

Cultural heritage sites in Brougham

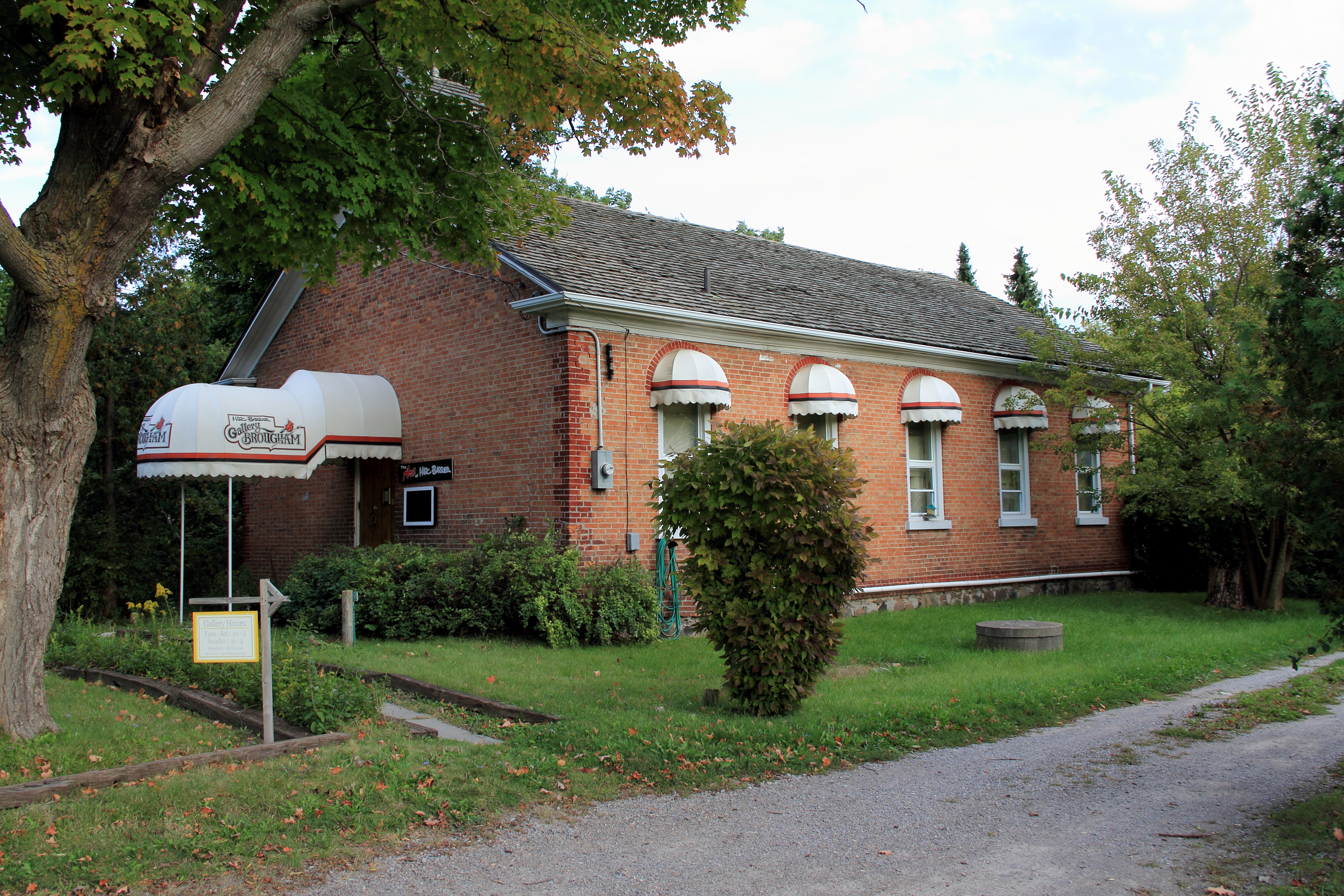
Former Brougham School House c. 1859

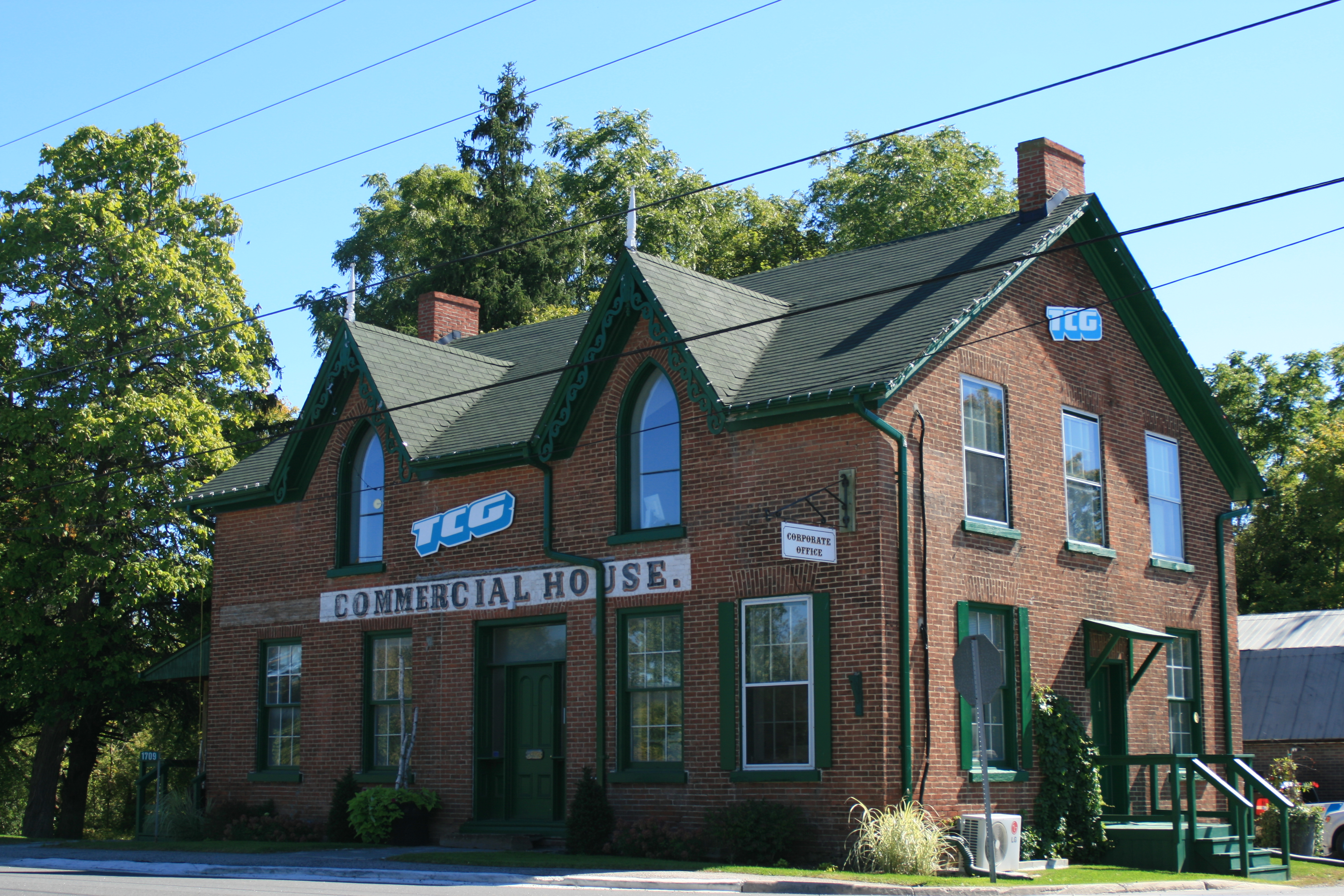
Former Commercial Hotel, c 1860 as residential home

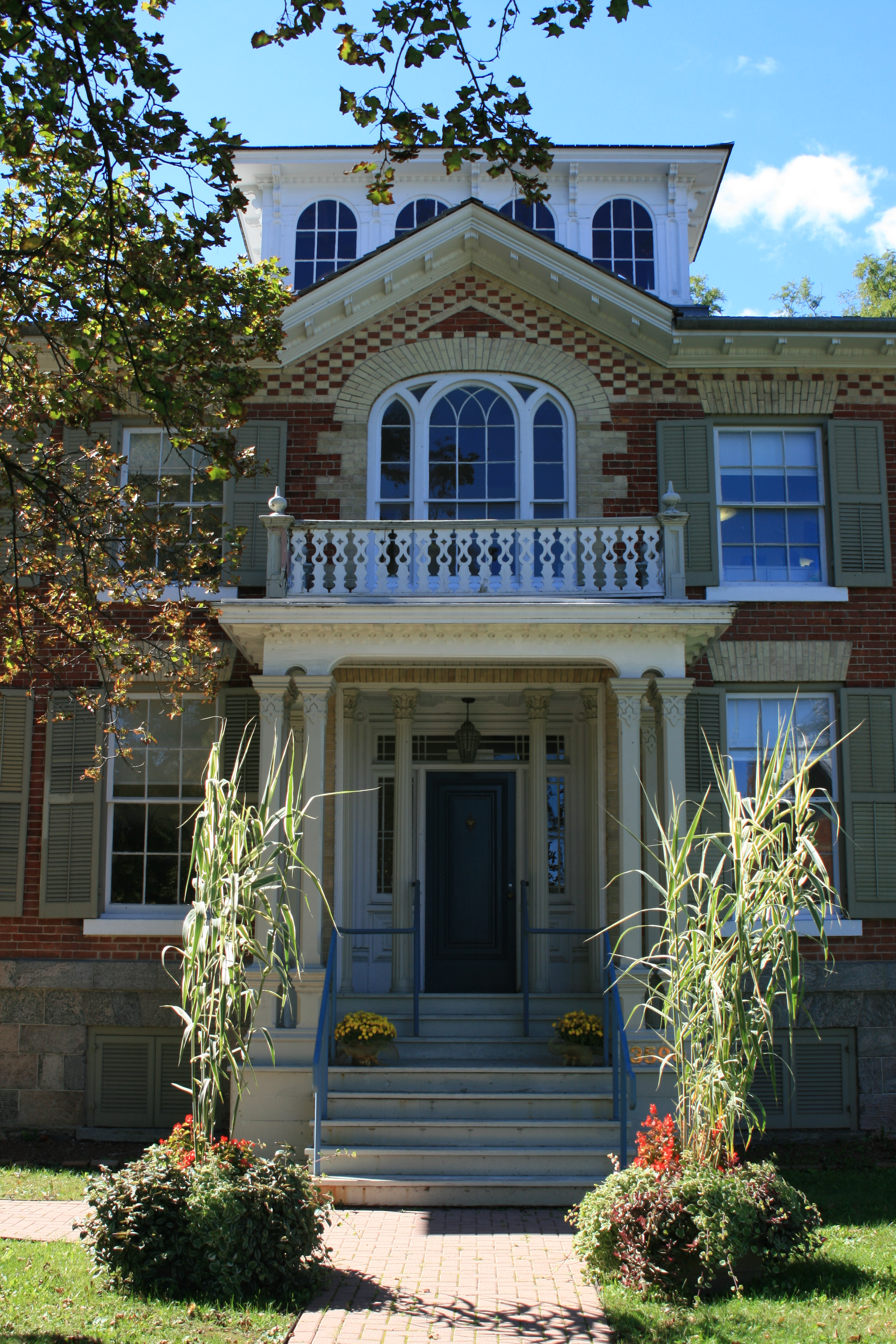
Front Door of the Bentley House c. 1853-1855

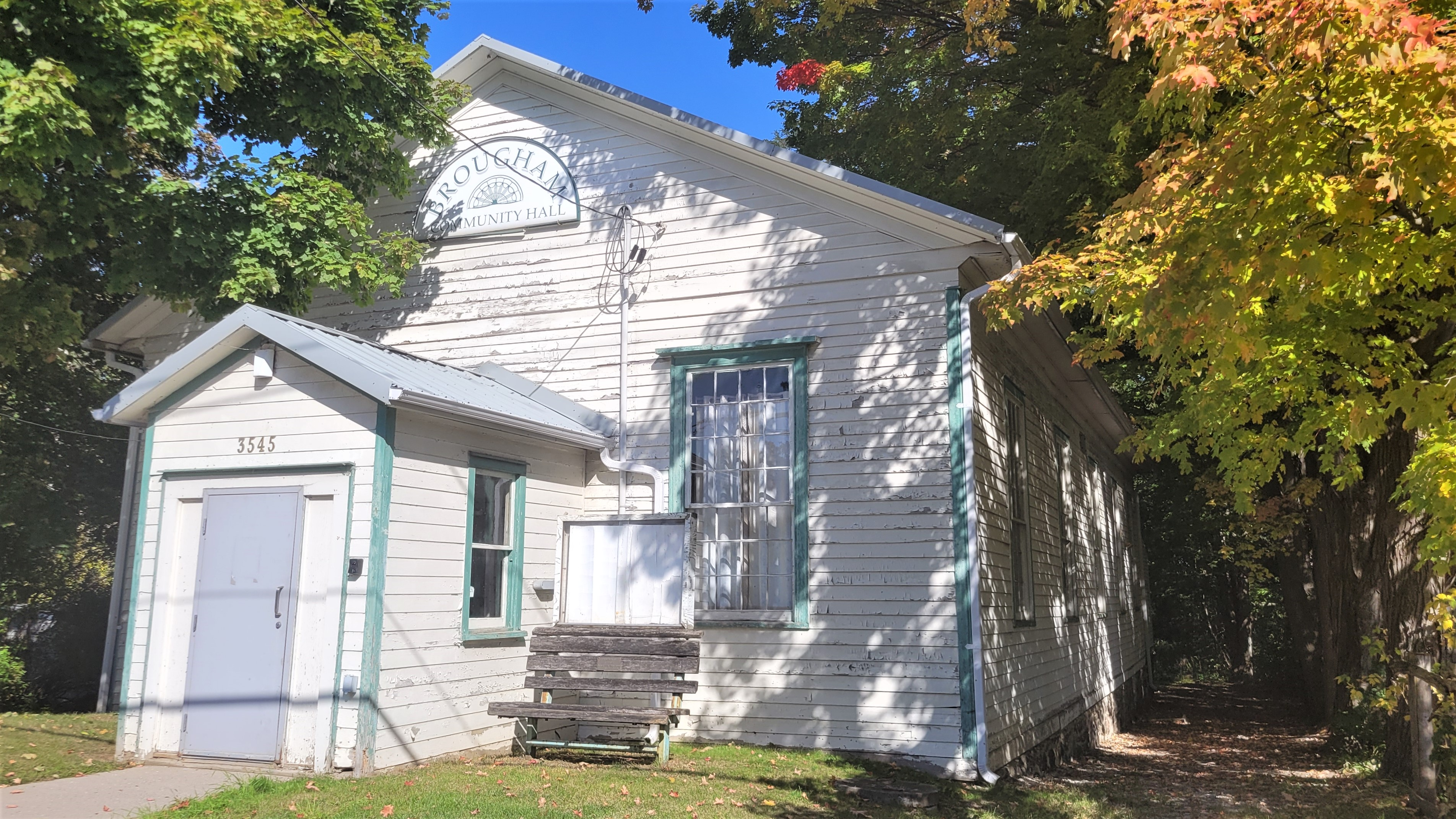
Brougham Community Hall c. 1854

To the north of the Hamlet, there is the historical site of Thistle Ha', which consists of a plaque on the side of the road; and an old Historical Hotel that has fallen into disuse. There are unsubstantiated rumours that an old inn stood at the corner of 5th concession and Brock Road that served as a staging point of the MacKenzie Rebellion. None of the buildings standing at that intersection are identifiable as public houses, but other historical buildings such as the Old Brougham Inn indicate that such businesses did exist meaning that the likelier is that the Inn itself was likely the staging point in question, if the rumors' are to be believed.

== See also ==
- List of unincorporated communities in Ontario
