= List of numbered roads in Peel Region =

List of regional roads

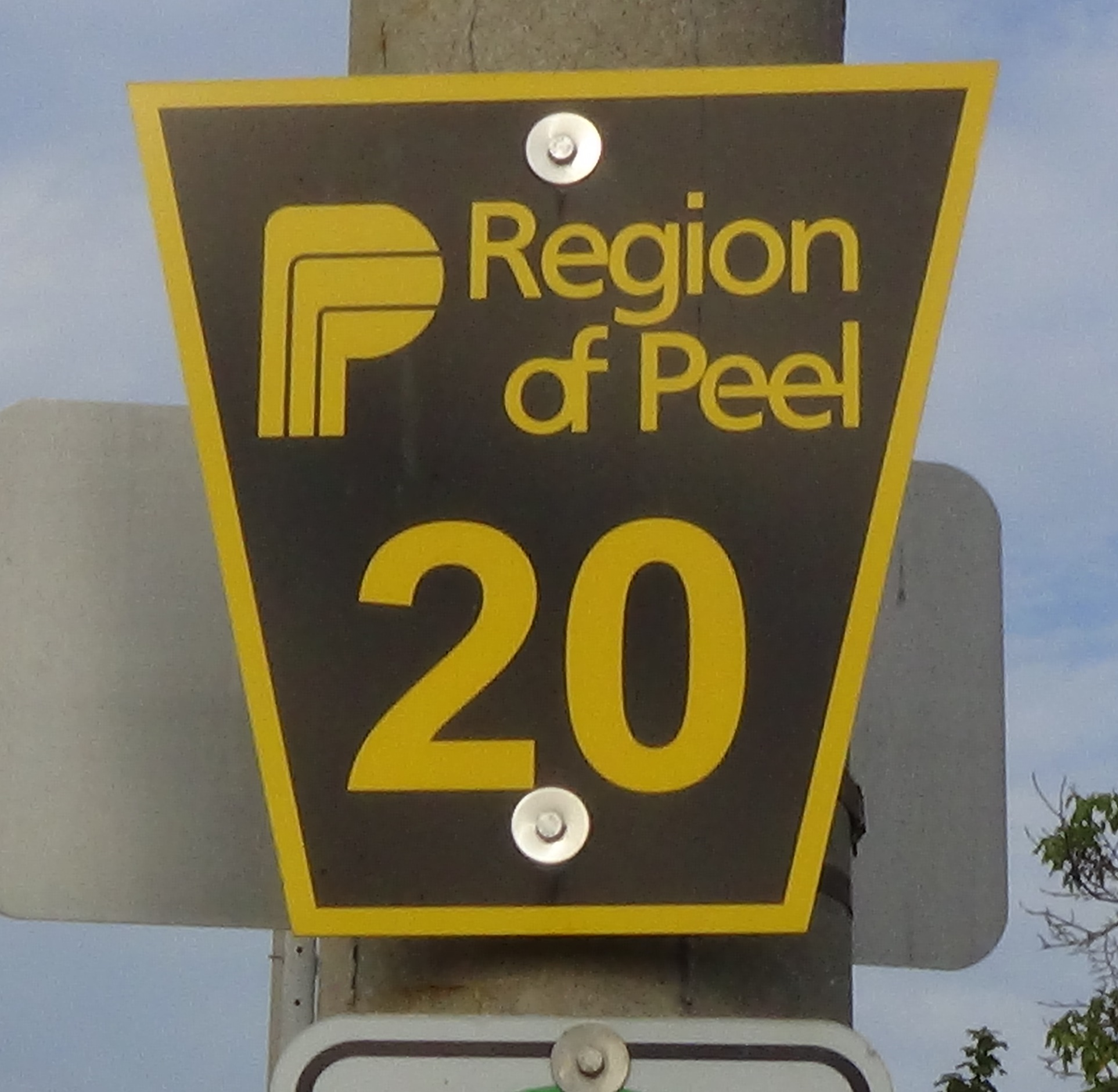
Peel Road 20 sign on Queensway in Mississauga

This page lists all of the numbered regional roads in Peel Region, Ontario. In December 2024, the government of Ontario tabled a bill for Peel Region to transfer all regionally-maintained and signed roads to its constituent municipalities of Mississauga, Brampton, and Caledon, which if carried out would see the decommissioning of the entire regional road system.

Number	Names	Western/southern terminus	Eastern/northern terminus	Major communities/neighborhoods	Notes
	Mississauga Road, Erin Mills Parkway	Interchange with Queen Elizabeth Way (Exit 126)	RR 11	Mississauga, Erin Mills, Streetsville, Meadowvale, Huttonville, Brampton, Cheltenham, Belfountain	The Regional Road 1 designation changes from Erin Mills Parkway to Mississauga Road at the intersection with Turner Valley Road, bypassing the southern portion of Mississauga Road which is a secondary arterial. Continues as a minor road north of RR11 via Forks of the Credit Road but not as Peel Regional Road 1 and ends at Caledon Lake Forest in Orangeville.
	Finch Avenue	Interchange with Highway 427 (boundary between Peel Region and the City of Toronto)	RR 15	Malton, Claireville	The shortest regional road at 2 km. in length. Continues east of Highway 427 into Toronto
	Britannia Road(West)	Interchange with Highway 407 (Exit 28), (boundary with Halton Regional Municipality, continues as Halton RR 6)	Hurontario Street	Mississauga, Streetsville, Meadowvale	Continues east of Hurontario Street under the jurisdiction of the City of Mississauga
	Dixie Road	Lakeshore Road	RR 12	Mississauga, Lakeview, Brampton, Bramalea	Passes by Toronto Pearson International Airport to the west; Regional jurisdiction terminates at the Region's first roundabout and continues north as Horseshoe Hill Road under the jurisdiction of the Town of Caledon. Double-designated as Veterans Memorial Roadway since 2016.
	Derry Road	Interchange with Highway 407 (Exit 31), (boundary with Halton RM), continues as Halton RR 7	Highway 427 (boundary with the City of Toronto), continues as Rexdale Boulevard	Mississauga, Malton, Meadowvale	Passes by Toronto Pearson International Airport to the north.
	Queen Street	Mississauga Road	McMurchy Avenue	Huttonville, Brampton	Has a break between McMurchy Avenue and Highway 410, where Queen Street is maintained by the City of Brampton; Queen Street becomes Regional Road 107 east of Highway 410, where RR 107 is a redesignation of the former Highway 7, which also followed Bovaird Drive to the north, west of the 410. Embleton Road, a street which follows the same baseline as Queen between Mississauga Road and Winston Churchill Boulevard, was designated as part of Regional Road 6 until 2021 when it was transferred to the jurisdiction of Brampton.
	Airport Road	Interchange with Highway 427 (boundary with the City of Toronto), continues as Dixon Road	Highway 9 (boundary with Dufferin County), and continues as Dufferin Road 18	Mississauga, Malton, Brampton, Tullamore, Caledon, Sandhill, Caledon East, Mono Road, Mono Mills	Travels from Toronto Pearson International Airport up through the Caledon Highlands to Highway 9; Airport Road itself continues north as Dufferin Road 18 and is a major route to the Georgian Triangle
	The Gore Road	Peel RR 50/York RR 24	Highway 9	Brampton, Clairville, Sunset Corners, Ebenezer, Wildfield, Caledon, Macville	Named after the former township of Toronto Gore. Spurs off Highway 50 just north of Steeles Avenue and travels up to Highway 9
	King Street	Halton RR 19/Peel RR 19	Caledon–King Townline (boundary with York Regional Municipality, continues as York RR 11)	Caledon, Terra Cotta, Victoria, Sandhill, Macville, Bolton	
	Bovaird Drive East	Interchange with RR 107 and Highway 410	RR 7	Bramalea, Brampton	Continues east of Airport Road as Castlemore Road under the jurisdiction of the City of Brampton
	Bush Street, Forks of the Credit Road	Intersection with Wellington CR 25/Peel RR 19 (boundary with Wellington County, continues as Wellington CR 52)	Highway 10	Sligo, Forks of the Credit	Caledon, Belfountain, Near the Forks of the Credit Provincial Park
	Olde Baseline Road	Intersection with Wellington CR 25/Peel RR 19 (boundary with Wellington County)	RR 7	Caledon, Inglewood, Mono Road	
	Mayfield Road	Intersection with Halton RR 19/Peel RR 19 (boundary with Halton RM), Continues as 17 sideroad	Intersection with Peel RR 50/York RR 24	Brampton, Alloa, Snelgrove, Mayfield, Tullamore, Wildfield, Tormore	Acts as the boundary between Brampton and Caledon except for a portion centred around Hurontario Street; continues past Regional Road 50 as Albion-Vaughan Road under the jurisdiction of the Town of Caledon
	Steeles Avenue	Intersection with Halton RR 19/Peel RR 19 and Halton RR 8 (boundary with Halton RM, continues as Halton RR 8)	RR 50 (boundary with the City of Toronto)	Brampton, Clairville	Continuation of Steeles Avenue in Toronto.
	Kennedy Road	RR 15	RR 107	Brampton, Caledon & Mississauga	Continues north and south under the jurisdiction of the City of Brampton, then runs south up to Central Parkway East, Mississauga. Named for former local MPP and Premier of Ontario Thomas Laird Kennedy.
	Cawthra Road	Lakeshore Road	Interchange with Highway 403 and Eastgate Parkway (Exit 121)	Mississauga, Lakeview, Dixie	Named for settler Joseph Cawthra.
	Mavis Road	RR 15	Highway 407	Brampton	Only a short section of Mavis Road (which continues south of Highway 407 through Mississauga to The Queensway) is signed under regional jurisdiction; continues north of Steeles Avenue as Chinguacousy Road under the jurisdiction of the City of Brampton
	Winston Churchill Boulevard, Adamson Street, King Street	(Southern section) Lakeshore Road in Mississauga, (Northern section) Highway 401	(Southern section) Dundas Street, (Northern section) Intersection with Wellington CR 52 (boundary with Wellington County, continues as Peel RR 19/Wellington CR 25) until Beech Grove Sideroad	Terra Cotta, Norval, Georgetown, Oakville, Halton Hills, Erin, Ontario	Mostly serves as the boundary between Peel and Halton Regions and between Peel Region and Wellington County, except for the section between Dundas Street and Highway 401, where the Regional line moves west and the road is fully in Peel Region (Mississauga). Regional road designation is interrupted through this section; road diverts west to briefly run entirely within Halton in the vicinity of Norval, where it is named Adamson Street
	Queensway	Mavis Road	Etobicoke Creek (boundary with the City of Toronto)	Mississauga, Cooksville	Continues west of Mavis Road under the jurisdiction of the City of Mississauga
	Old Church Road	RR 7	RR 50	Caledon, Caledon East, Albion, Cedar Mills	Continues east of Regional Road 50 under the jurisdiction of the Town of Caledon
	Caledon-East Garafraxa Townline	Dufferin RR 23 (B-Line)	RR 136	Caledon, Orangeville	Forms part of the boundary between Peel Region and Dufferin County; also designated Dufferin Road 23 and signed only as such
	Charleston Sideroad	Peel RR 19/Wellington CR 25 (boundary with Wellington County, continues as Wellington CR 124)	RR 7	Caledon, Cataract, Coulterville	Segment east of Highway 10 formerly designated as Regional Road 11; segment west of Highway 10 formerly designated as Highway 51 (no relation to the present Highway 51) from 1938 until 1962, when Highway 24 was extended along this road to Highway 10 while the old Highway 24 alignment became Highway 136
	Peel Regional Road 50, Queen Street	Steeles Avenue (corner boundary with the City of Toronto), continues southeast as Albion Road	Highway 9 (Boundary with Simcoe County, continues as Simcoe CR 50)	Clairville, Sunset Corners, Brampton, Bolton, Cedar Mills, Palgrave	Formerly Highway 50. South of Bolton, it forms the border between Peel and York Regions, and is also designated as York Regional Road 24, although it is not signed as such.
	Bovaird Drive, Queen Street East	Halton RR 19/Peel RR 19 (continues into Halton RM as Highway 7)	RR 50 (boundary with York RM (continues as York RR 7))	Norval, Mount Pleasant, Brampton, Bramalea	Formerly Highway 7; follows two separate roadways jogged by Highway 410 (following Bovaird Drive west of it and Queen Street east of it)
	Main Street, Queen Street, Porterfield Road	RR 24, continues as Cataract Road under the jurisdiction of the Town of Caledon	Orangeville Town Limits, continues as Townline	Caledon, Cataract, Coulterville, Alton, Orangeville	Original Highway 24 alignment from April 13, 1938, to 1962. Highway 136 from 1962 to April 1, 1997. Fully paved by 1966, first from Cataract to Alton in 1964, then from Alton to Orangeville.
	Emil Kolb Parkway, Coleraine Drive	Peel RR 50/York RR 24 (boundary with York RM); turns east to continue as York Road 25 (Major Mackenzie Drive))	RR 50	Bolton	Mostly a purpose-built bypass of Bolton, but incorporates a section of the pre-existing Coleraine Drive

== See also ==
- List of roads in Brampton
- List of roads in Mississauga
