= Belfountain, Ontario =

Belfountain
- Community
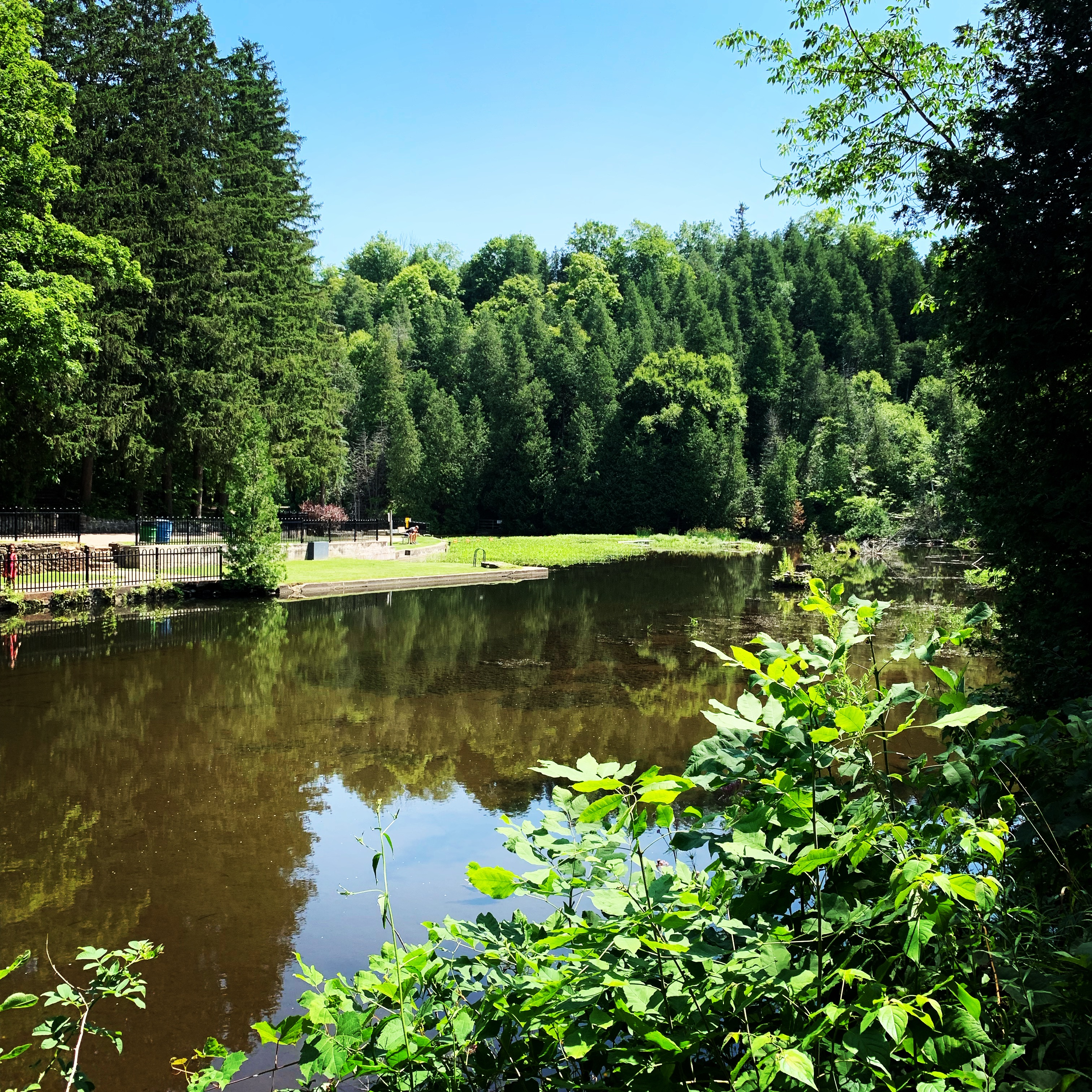

- Location of Belfountain within Canada Belfountain (Canada)
- Coordinates: 43°47′39″N 80°0′51″W
- Country: Canada
- Province: Ontario
- Regional municipality: Peel
- Town: Caledon
- First settled: 1825
  - Density: 25/km^{2} (65/sq mi)

Belfountain is a community located within the borders of the town of Caledon, in Peel Region, Ontario, Canada.

== Geography ==
Belfountain is situated on the left branch of the Credit River, and is geographically located occidental within the borders of Caledon, east of the town of Erin. It is also located approximately 50 kilometers north of the city of Brampton. The Caledon Ski Club is located north of the main centre of Belfountain. The Niagara Escarpment runs through the upper part of the village, and remains the base for the Belfountain Conservation Area.

== History ==
Belfountain was first settled in 1825. Originally named McCurdy's, the small village grew significantly throughout the late 19th century. In 1853, a postmaster – last name Bush, came up with the name "Belfountain" for the community, possibly relating to the Cox Property Pound. Currently, there are plans to expand the townlet in the southern areas. There have been many concerns within residents about water treatment as a result of the city's eventual expansion.

== See also ==
- Bolton
- Mayfield West
- Palgrave
- Alton
- Caledon East
- Caledon Village
- Wildfield
- Alloa
- Inglewood
- Cheltenham
