= Cheltenham, Ontario =

Cheltenham
- Unincorporated community
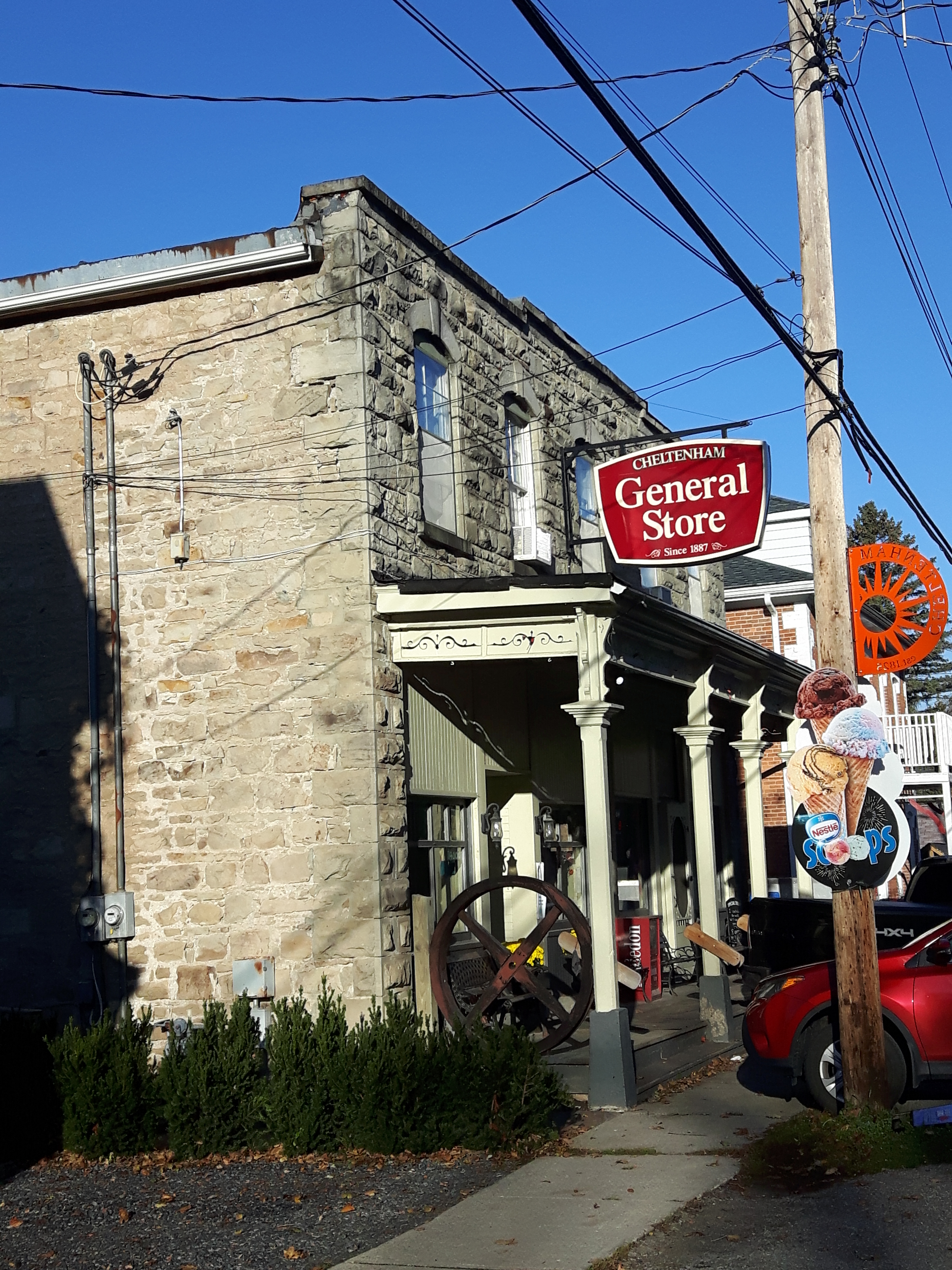
- Cheltenham General Store
- Interactive map of Cheltenham
- Country: Canada
- Province: Ontario
- Regional Municipality: Peel Region
- Town: Caledon
- Settled: 1820

Population
  - Total: 729
  - Density: 191/km^{2} (490/sq mi)

Cheltenham is a small unincorporated village located within the Town of Caledon, in Peel Region, Ontario. It has a population of 729 people. The village is named after Cheltenham, England.

== Geography ==
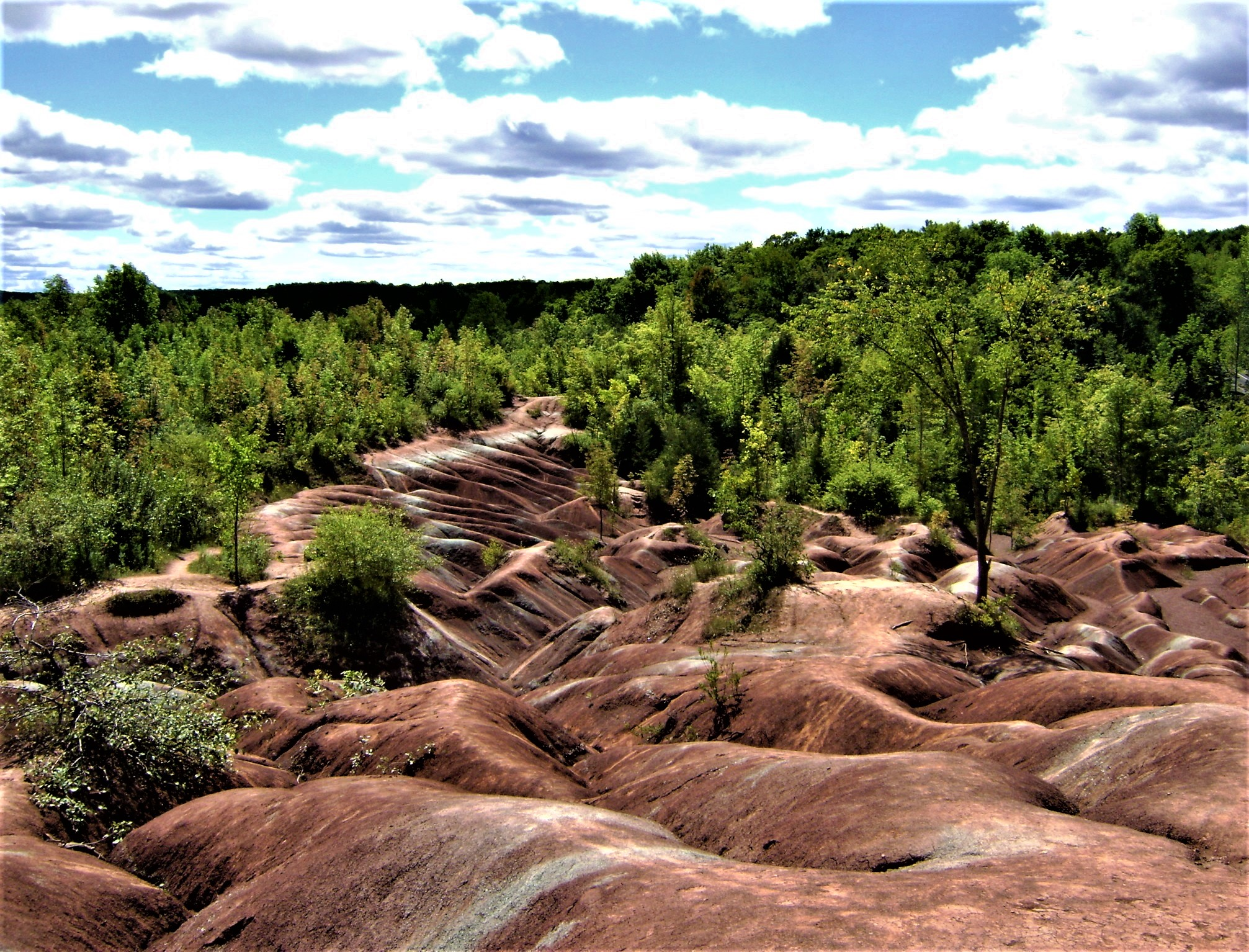
The Cheltenham Badlands

Cheltenham is located in the Greater Toronto Area and the Golden Horseshoe Region, in Caledon. The village is known for the iconic Cheltenham Badlands, a rock formation made of red-coloured ridges and gullies. The badlands are an exposed section of the Queenston Shale. The village also has access to the Caledon Trailway.

== History ==
Historically, in 1819, the village was part of the Chinguacousy Township. The soils and plateaus were very fertile, which prompted settlement in the area. Up until 1945, milling was the prime industry in the village, until the burning of the local mill. Moreover, there were several blacksmith and flour shops opened prior to the destruction of the mill. In 1851, the village was well-established as a wheat exporter, and had a population of 225. In 1874, the Hamilton & North Western Railway was expanded into the proximity of the village. The village's mainstay of small businesses gradually declined toward the end of the 1800s, and Cheltenham was reduced to a secondary service centre, its role replaced by the bigger centre of Brampton. In 1887, the Cheltenham General Store opened and remains opened to present. In the years of 1920, the train started bringing summer tourists to the area, and Ferndale Park was established just north of the village on the banks of the Credit River. Cheltenham has a variety of historic buildings, both commercial and residential, and has the largest concentration of designated heritage properties of all of Caledon's villages.

== See also ==
- Bolton
- Mayfield West
- Palgrave
- Alton
- Belfountain
- Caledon East
- Caledon Village
- Wildfield
- Alloa
- Inglewood
