= Ontario Highway 136 =

Former Ontario provincial highway

King's Highway 136
- Peel Regional Road 136; John Street, Townline Road (within Orangeville); Main Street, Queen Street (within Alton)

Route information
- Maintained by the Regional Municipality of Peel and Town of Orangeville
- Length: 13.3 km (8.3 mi)
- Existed: 1962–April 1, 1997

Major junctions
- South end: Regional Road 24 (Charleston Sideroad) formerly Highway 24
- North end: County Road 109 (Broadway) formerly Highway 9

Location
- Country: Canada
- Province: Ontario
- Divisions: Peel Region, Dufferin County
- Towns: Caledon, Orangeville
- Villages: Cataract, Coulterville, Alton

Highway system
- Ontario provincial highways; Current; Former; 400-series
← Highway 135	→ Highway 137

King's Highway 136, commonly referred to as Highway 136, was a provincially maintained highway in the Canadian province of Ontario that connected former Highway 24 near Caledon with Highway 9 in Orangeville. The majority of the route was located in the Regional Municipality of Peel; however, the section in Orangeville was in Dufferin County. The route of Highway 136 was originally part of Highway 24; it was created in 1962 when Highway 24 was rerouted along Highway 51. The highway remained unchanged until 1997, when it was transferred to the Regional Municipality of Peel and the Town of Orangeville.

The majority of the former highway is rural in nature, passing through farmland on the highlands of the Niagara Escarpment, located a short distance south of the southern terminus of the route. Near its northern terminus, the surrounds are suburban as the highway enters Orangeville. The only notable community on the route other than Orangeville is Alton.

== Route description ==
Highway 136 was a short route through the northern section of Caledon. The former route is mostly rural, surrounded by the expanse of farmland that sits atop the Niagara Escarpment. The route follows several concession roads along its length, and is known locally by the names of those roads today. It begins at a junction with former Highway 24 (Charleston Sideroad) immediately north of Forks of the Credit Provincial Park, which straddles the escarpment northwest of Brampton. The route proceeds northwest alongside the Charles Sauriol Conservation Area for approximately 3.75 kilometres (2.33 mi) before entering the community of Alton. Within Alton, the route follows Main Street until a broad 90° curve directs traffic northeast onto Queen Street. It follows this road out of the community, encountering a railway crossing and the Credit River at the town limits.

The route takes another 90° curve to the northwest, intersecting Porterfield Road, after which the route takes that name. It crosses the same railway line and proceeds north for 4 kilometres (2.5 mi) between farm fields. South of Orangeville, the route intersects the Orangeville Bypass (Riddell Road), after which the farmland transitions to suburbs. It takes a broad curves to the northeast and becomes Townline Road, which acts as the boundary between Peel Region and Dufferin County as well as the town limits of Orangeville. After following this road for a kilometre, it intersects John Street. The final section of the route follows John Street northwest to end at former Highway 9 (Broadway).

== History ==
While the route dates back to 1962 as Highway 136, it is a former alignment of Highway 24, which was re-routed along Highway 51 towards Highway 10 that year. The road was first designated on February 10, 1937 as part of an extension of Highway 24 north from Guelph to Collingwood via Orangeville. Highway 136 was a gravel road at the time of the renumbering. The section between Cataract and Alton was paved first, in 1965; this was followed by the section between Alton and Orangeville in 1966.

The primary purpose of Highway 136 as a provincial highway was to maintain the former routing of Highway 24. However, as the route served a generally local and regional need, the Ministry of Transportation of Ontario transferred responsibility for signage and maintenance of the highway to the Regional Municipality of Peel and Town of Orangeville on April 1, 1997, at which point the majority of it was designated Peel Regional Road 25. To avoid confusing motorists and to make the regional route numbers consistent with former provincial route numbers, Peel redesignated several roads on March 26, 1998. Regional Road 25 was renumbered as Regional Road 136.

== Major intersections ==
The following table lists the major junctions along Highway 136, as noted by the Ministry of Transportation of Ontario.

Division	Location	km	mi	Destinations	Notes
Peel	Caledon	0.0	0.0	Regional Road 24 (Charleston Sideroad)	Formerly Highway 24
Peel	Alton	4.5	2.8	Queen Street East	
Peel	Caledon	10.3	6.4	Regional Road 109 (Riddell Road)	Orangeville southwest bypass
Peel	Caledon	10.9	6.8	Regional Road 23 (Caledon – East Garafraxa Townline)	Peel Regional Road 136 designation ends at Orangeville town limits
Dufferin	Orangeville	13.3	8.3	Broadway	Formerly Highway 9
1.000 mi = 1.609 km; 1.000 km = 0.621 mi
