= Police village =

Type of village in 19th-century Ontario, Canada

A police village was a form of municipal government that was used in the province of Ontario, Canada in the early 19th century if the finances or the population of an area did not permit the creation of a village.

== Formation ==
In the early 19th century, the Parliament of Upper Canada established "boards of police" in municipalities that were not large enough to justify the creation of a municipal council.

The creation of "police villages" was authorized in 1850 upon the passage of the Baldwin Act by the Parliament of the Province of Canada, and was continued by the Legislative Assembly of Ontario in 1873. The law relating to them remained essentially unchanged until 1965, when the ability to create new police villages was abolished.

The rules governing the formation of police villages were as follows:

1. A county council, upon the petition of a sufficient number of property owners and tenants, could erect a locality into a police village, so long as it had a population of not less than 150, and an area of not more than 500 acres (200 ha).
2. Where the locality straddled two or more counties, the council of the county that had the largest portion of the locality was the one that could establish the police village.
3. If the area was less than 500 acres (200 ha), the council could later increase the size up to that limit.
4. If the population later exceeded 500, upon the petition of two thirds of the owners and tenants, the area could be increased beyond that limit at the rate of 20 acres (8.1 ha) per 100 in population.
5. If an expansion of a police village involved an extension into another county, it could not occur without the consent of the other county council.
6. After the Ontario Municipal Board was established, such erections and expansions could not occur without its approval, and it also had direct power to erect and expand police villages if a county council has failed to act on a petition and if the locality was within one of the provisional judicial districts.

Almost all of the communities that once held that status have since been erected into villages, towns, or cities or amalgamated into other municipalities. Russell still exists as such a body.

Police villages were dissolved with provincial acts creating new municipalities. In 1971, the creation of York Region resulted in the dissolution of Holland Landing, King City, Maple, Mount Albert, Nobleton, Queensville, Schomberg, Sharon, Thornhill, and Unionville as police villages. The responsibilities of the police village boards were shifted to other boards or the municipality to which the police village was amalgamated. For example, the trustees of the police village of King City were deemed a commission for the King City Hydro-Electric System, which became a local board of the township of King with full transfer of all rights and obligations.

== Benefits of police village status ==
Police village status allowed a community to establish its own council to direct spending on local priorities, such as roadways, sidewalks, drainage, lighting, sanitation, fire protection, and policing.

== Police villages ==
Former police villages by historical county in Ontario
| Historical County | Police village (with date of creation) |
|---|---|
| Brant County | Burford; St. George; Scotland; Tutela (1914) (Note: Since amalgamated with Brantford) |
| Carleton County | City View (1954); Cumberland; Kenmore; Manotick (1903); Metcalfe (1898); Navan; North Gower (1905); Rockcliffe Park (1908); Osgoode (1910); Overbrook (1922); St-Joseph d'Orléans (1922); Ottawa West (1912); Sarsfield; Stittsville (1956); Vars |
| Elgin County | Belmont (Note: Shared with Middlesex County until 1949); Port Burwell (1900) |
| Essex County | Amherstburg; Comber; Cottam; Harrow; Seacliffe; Stoney Point |
| Haldimand County | Canfield; Fisherville; Selkirk |
| Halton County | Bronte; Campbellville (1914); Eden Mills (1930) (Note: Shared with Wellington County until 1974) |
| Hastings County | Belleville (1834); Frankford (1854) |
| Huron County | Auburn; Crediton; Centralia; Dashwood |
| Kent County | Merlin |
| Lambton County | Brigden (unknown); Corunna (unknown); Inwood (unknown); Sombra; Courtright |
| United Counties of Leeds & Grenville | Brockville (1832); Lyn; Prescott (1834); Spencerville |
| Lincoln County | Campden; Jordan; Jordan Station; Queenston; St. Davids; Smithville (1914); Vineland |
| Middlesex County | Kerwood; Lambeth (unknown) |
| Norfolk County | St. Williams; Vittoria |
| United Counties of Northumberland and Durham | Orono |
| Ontario County | Cannington (1870-1878); Claremont (1908-1968); Pickering (1900) (Note: Incorporated as a village in 1953, then amalgamated with the Town of Ajax in 1974); Sunderland (1900) |
| Oxford County | Beachville; Bright; Burgessville; Drumbo; Innerkip; Otterville; Plattsville; Princeton; Thamesford; Tillsonburg |
| Peel County | Alton (unknown); Caledon (Village) (unknown); Caledon East (1913); Inglewood (unknown); Malton (1914) (Note: Dissolved in 1968, on the erection of the Town of Mississauga); Palgrave (unknown) |
| Perth County | Dublin |
| United Counties of Prescott and Russell | Embrun (1908); Russell (1898) |
| Renfrew County | Pembroke (1856) |
| Simcoe County | Angus; Everett; Hawkestone; Hillsdale; Nottawa; Thornton |
| United Counties of Stormont, Dundas and Glengarry | Aultsville; Avonmore; Williamsburg; Winchester Springs |
| Victoria County | Coboconk; Kinmount; Kirkfield; Pleasant Point |
| Waterloo County | Baden; Conestoga; Linwood; St. Clements; St. Jacobs |
| Welland County | Crystal Beach (1898); Fenwick |
| Wellington County | Belwood; Hillsburgh; Moorefield; Orton (1907) (Note: Shared with Dufferin County; dissolved in 1967.); Rockwood (1903) |
| Wentworth County | Ancaster (1852); Freelton (unknown); Lynden (unknown); Mount Hope (unknown) |
| York County | Buttonville (unknown); Holland Landing (unknown); King City (1934); Kingsdale; Maple (1928); Mount Albert (unknown); Markham (Village) (1873); Mimico (1905) (Note: established as a village in January 1911; erected into a town in May 1917 (An Act to incorporate the Town of Mimico, S.O. 1917, c. 77 ); amalgamated into the Borough of Etobicoke in January 1967 (The Municipality of Metropolitan Toronto Amendment Act, 1966, S.O. 1966, c. 96, s. 14 )); Nobleton (unknown); Queensville (unknown); Schomberg (25 March 1899); Sharon (unknown); Thistletown (1933); Thornhill (1931); Unionville (1907) |
