= Forks of the Credit =

Forks of the Credit may refer to:

- Forks of the Credit Provincial Park, a park in Ontario, Canada
- Forks of the Credit, Ontario, a community within Caledon, Ontario
