= Cataract, Ontario =

Cataract
- Hamlet
- Location of Cataract within Ontario/Canada Cataract (Canada)
- Coordinates: 43°49′28″N 80°1′20″W
- Country: Canada
- Province: Ontario
- Regional Municipality: Peel
- Town: Caledon
- Ward: 1
- Land Purchased: 1858
- Incorporated and Named: 1864
- Founder: Richard Church of Cooksville, Mississauga
- Elevation: 363 m (1,191 ft)

Cataract is a hamlet located within the town of Caledon in the regional municipality of Peel, Ontario, Canada. As of 2006, it had a population of 106 people.

== History ==
In 1858, Richard Church, an entrepreneur of Cooksville in Mississauga bought a parcel of land near Brimstone Peak, with hopes to establish a village. The plan never reached success and the area remained with small farmlands and rural houses. In 1864, a post office was inaugurated and the Church assumed the role of postmaster. The area was recognized as Cataract, tby the Credit Valley Railway upon the opening of its station in the hamlet in 1879. Subsequently, Canadian Pacific assumed control of the railway line, which remained operational until 1987 when the Cataract station was dismantled. A second gold rush apparently took place in the valley near Cataract in 1873 where many people from the Lake Ontario area came to find gold. The origin of the name "Cataract" stems from its association with waterfalls, a feature notably present nearby at the Forks of the Credit Provincial Park. The wooden mill was sold later on and burned down in 1881. It was later rebuilt by the Wheeler brothers before burning again in 1885, after which it was sold to entrepreneur John Deagle who spent many years converting it to electric-powered, and setup power lines to create one of the earliest electric commercial industries in the region. In 1902, Deagle expanded the plant with plans for a tunnel from Cataract Lake to Brimstone, increasing water drop to 150 feet. However, spring flooding in 1921 washed out Dominion Road and halted tunnel plans. Today, you can walk the old road from Cataract Hall to the falls, tracing its history back to Dominion Day. After the flood, Deagle sold the business in 1923, leading to bankruptcy and its rebirth as Caledon Electric in 1925. Ontario Hydro acquired it during World War Two, closing the Cataract hydro station in 1947 and demolishing the dam in 1953, altering the landscape significantly. Subsequently, the hamlet transformed into an exclusive residential area amidst its geography. The former railway line became the Elora-Cataract Trailway, highlighting its role in the area's development. Historically, these areas were part of the Peel County and the Chinguacousy Township, until its amalgamation into the newly formed town of Caledon in 1974.

== Geography ==
The hamlet is located in Ward 1 of the town of Caledon. It is located south of Alton, and north of Brimstone, Belfountain and the Forks of Credit Provincial Park, where a set of waterfalls is named after the locality. The falls emerged after many erosion processes of the Credit River. It is also sometimes called George's Falls.
