= Brimstone, Caledon, Ontario =

Brimstone
- Hamlet
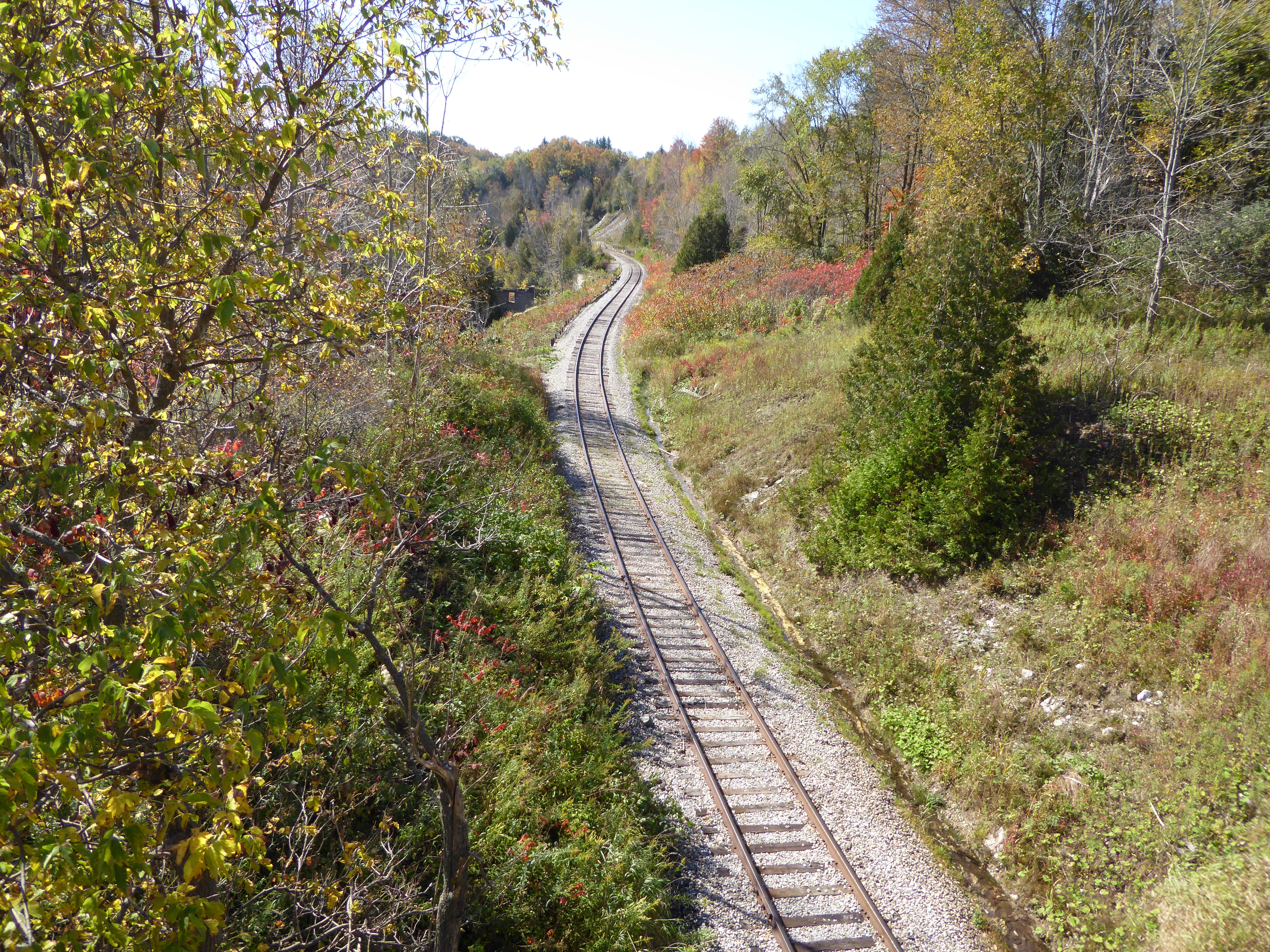
- Disused railway track in Forks of the Credit Provincial Park

- Location of Brimstone within Canada Brimstone (Canada)
- Coordinates: 43°48′1″N 79°59′51″W
- Province: Ontario
- Regional Municipality: Peel
- Hamlet: Caledon
- Elevation: 336 m (1,102 ft)

Population (2006)
  - Total: 53

Brimstone, also known locally as Brimstone Point, is a small hamlet located within the town of Caledon in the Peel Region of Ontario, Canada. The population was 53 people in the 2006 census.

== Geography ==
Brimstone is located in the west side of Caledon. Moreover, it is located within Ward 1. Geographically, the hamlet is located eastly in close proximity to the village of Belfountain, south of Alton and north of Terra Cotta. The elevation is 336 meters above sea level.

== Places of Interest ==
- Cox Property: Small zone, includes ruins of former castle and aerial tramway.
- Caledon Ski Club: Privately owned ski hill and club.
- Forks of the Credit Provincial Park: Large protected park, located upon the Niagara Escarpment and the Credit River.
- Bruce Trail: Hiking and biking trail spanning 885 kilometers.
