= Geoffrey Rock =

British-Canadian artist (1923–2000)

- Born: August 1, 1923
- Died: August 31, 2000 (aged 77)
- Education: Birmingham College of Art, London Central School of Art
- Known for: painter
- Movement: Realism

Geoffrey Alan Rock (1 August 1923 – 31 August 2000) was an English-Canadian painter. He was best known for his proficiency in realism. Rock’s works can be found in art collections around the world.

== Biography ==
Geoffrey Rock was born in 1923 in Birmingham, England. Rock was the son of his 17-year-old mother. As a young boy, Rock demonstrated artistic talent. He left home at the age of fourteen and attended the Birmingham College of Art as a gratis student, sitting in on classes. One day during roll call, a professor discovered Rock’s artwork and accepted him into the school free of charge due to his exceptional talent.

Upon completing his studies, Rock moved away to London, England where he became an apprentice for an advertising firm and attended the London Central School of Art. Eventually, he began doing commercial artwork for the advertising firm. Also while in London, Rock met his future wife Joan, a Welsh woman from Cardiff who was working as the personal secretary to Lord Beaverbrook. They were married in 1942. A short time later, Rock entered World War II as a “war artist”, painting portraits of superior officers and sketching depictions of battle scenes. Rock was present for the D-Day landings at Normandy on June 6, 1944. When the war ended, he returned to London and worked as an assistant to Sir James Gunn, who did portraits of the British royal family. Rock worked under Gunn for five years. As an assistant, one of Rock’s paintings entitled “St. George’s Chapel” drew the attention of Queen Elizabeth II, who decided to use it for her official annual Christmas card of 1954. It was also during this time that Rock’s wife gave birth to a daughter, Deborah, and son, Nigel. In 1956, the Rock family emigrated to Montreal, Canada. Shortly thereafter, Joan gave birth to their third child, Christopher. The Rock family spent time moving throughout Canada before settling into an old farmer’s home in Cheltenham, Ontario. The family spent twelve years there before moving west to Pender Island, British Columbia. While in British Columbia, Rock was able to turn his full attention to his work, which led him to opening a studio in West Vancouver. Rock was invited in the early 1970s to the Douglas Lake Ranch, northwest of Cache Creek, resulting in the creation of a series of works that derived from an environment of working cowboys. In the years following, Rock would continue to hone his craft and gain recognition through various art shows and exhibits. Geoffrey Rock died August 31, 2000.

== Style and influences ==
As a young boy, Rock often visited the Birmingham Museum and Art Gallery, where he spent hours studying each painting individually. He became particularly influenced by the Pre-Raphaelite painters Holman Hunt, Burne-Jones, and Ford Madox Brown. Rock’s study of these painters allowed him to develop his own realistic style of painting. In a 1981 publication of Arts West magazine, Rock described his creative process by stating, “I use reality as a starting point, but project on the canvas my most intimate reaction to the subject. I spend hours searching for the right subject; it has to strike a particular creative chord. I give my work total concentration… I enter a trance-like state, and it is hard to come back to reality. Painting is exhausting, demanding, and at times frustrating but in the long run an intensely satisfying occupation.”

== Legacy ==
Rock held a number of solo art shows throughout his career at various locations including: Yellow Door Gallery (Winnipeg), Art Gallery of Windsor (Windsor), Gainsborough Gallery (Calgary), Galerie Sherbrook (Montreal), Art Emporium (Vancouver) and Backroom Gallery (Victoria). Additionally, Rock held multiple shows at the following locations: Pollock Gallery (Toronto), Alex Fraser Gallery (Vancouver), and Laing Art Gallery (Toronto). The work of Geoffrey Rock has been represented in collections throughout Canada and the United States. Rock’s youngest son, Christopher, followed in his father’s footsteps and has become a painter in Victoria, British Columbia.
