= Cataract (disambiguation) =

A cataract is an opacity in the lens of the eye or its capsule.

Cataract also may refer to:

- Cataract, any large, powerful waterfall
- Cataract (beam engine), governor used for early steam engines
- Jehu (or John) O'Cataract, two pen names for John Neal (1793-1876)
- Shawinigan Cataractes, ice-hockey team

== Places ==
- Cataract Gorge, river gorge on Tasmania, Australia

=== Egypt ===
- Cataracts of the Nile
- Old Cataract Hotel, a hotel in Aswan, Egypt

=== Canada ===
- Cataract, Ontario

=== United States ===
- Cataract, Indiana
- Cataract, Wisconsin
- Cataract Canyon, a 46-mile-long canyon on the Colorado River in Utah

== Music ==
=== Performing groups ===
- The Cataracs, Berkeley, California hip hop duo
- Cataract (band), European metalcore band from Switzerland

=== Works ===
- Cataract (Cataract album), by the eponymous band
- Songs:
  - "Cataract," by Sparta on album Wiretap Scars (2002)
  - "Cataracts", by Andrew Bird on album Armchair Apocrypha (2007)
