= List of mayors of Caledon, Ontario =

Mayor of Caledon
- Incumbent; Annette Groves since 2022
- Style: Mayor
- Member of: Caledon Town Council
- Reports to: Caledon Town Council
- Seat: Caledon Town Hall (Caledon East, Ontario, Canada)
- Appointer: Directly elected by residents of Caledon
- Term length: 4 years
- Formation: 1974; 52 years ago
- First holder: Ivor McMullin
- Salary: $84,659.40 (2017)

The following is a list of mayors of Caledon, Ontario.

No.	Name	Took office	Left office
1	Ivor McMullin	1974	1976
2	John Clarkson	1976	1985
3	Emil Kolb	1985	1991
4	Norm Calder	1991	1994
5	Carol Seglins	1994	2003
6	Marolyn Morrison	2003	2014
7	Allan Thompson	2014	2022
8	Annette Groves	2022	2026
9	Christina Early	2026	-
