= Caledon, Ontario =

Caledon
- Town (lower-tier)
- Town of Caledon
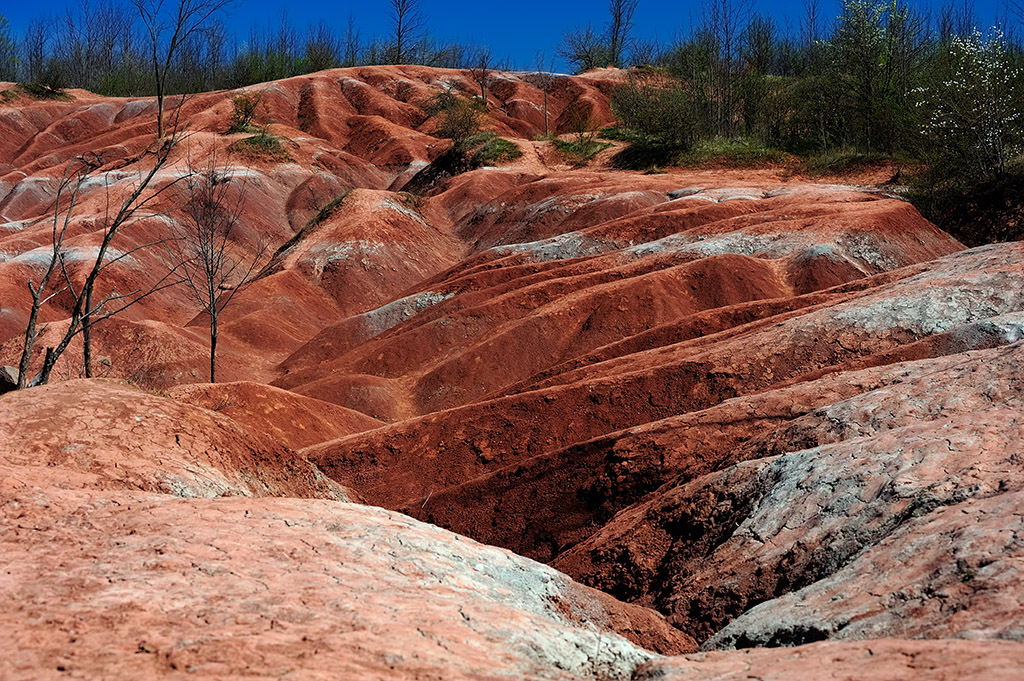
- Cheltenham Badlands

- Flag Logo

- Location within Regional Municipality of Peel Location within Southern Ontario
- Coordinates: 43°51′58″N 79°51′32″W
- Country: Canada
- Province: Ontario
- Regional municipality: Peel Region
- Established: January 1, 1974

Government
  - Mayor: Annette Groves
  - Governing Body: Caledon Town Council
  - MPs: Kyle Seeback (CPC); Ruby Sahota (LPC)
  - MPP: Sylvia Jones (PC)

Area
  - Total: 694.04 km^{2} (267.97 sq mi)
  - Land: 688.82 km^{2} (265.95 sq mi)
  - Water: 5.22 km^{2} (2.02 sq mi)
- Highest elevation: 485 m (1,591 ft)
- Lowest elevation: 221 m (725 ft)

Population (2021)
  - Total: 76,581
  - Density: 111.2/km^{2} (288/sq mi)
- Time zone: UTC−05:00 (EST)
  - Summer (DST): UTC−04:00 (EDT)
- Forward sortation area: L7C, L7K
- Area codes: 905, 519
- Website: Official website

Caledon (/ˈkælədən/; 2021 population 76,581) is a town in Peel Region, Ontario, Canada. The name comes from a shortened form of Caledonia, the Roman name for what is now Scotland. Caledon is primarily rural with a number of hamlets and small villages, but also contains the larger community of Bolton (population 26,795) in its southeastern quadrant, adjacent to York Region. Some spillover urbanization also occurs in the south bordering the City of Brampton.

Caledon is the northernmost of three municipalities of Peel Region and part of the Greater Toronto Area. The town is northwest of Brampton. According to Statistics Canada the land area is 688 km^{2} (266 sq mi) and, according to the city the area is 696.04 km^{2} (268.74 sq mi), which makes Caledon the largest municipality by area in the Greater Toronto Area.

== History ==
By 1869, Belfountain was a village with a population of 100 in the Township of Caledon, Peel County. It was established on the Credit River. There were stagecoaches to Erin and Georgetown. The average price of land was $20. The township was likely named by settlers like Edward Ellis, who came from the area around Caledon, County Tyrone, now in Northern Ireland, or by public voting.

In 1974, Caledon's land area roughly tripled in size when Caledon Township was restructured into the present town by amalgamating with the part of Chinguacousy Township north of Mayfield Road (excluding Snelgrove), with the southern half becoming part of Brampton; as well as the villages of Bolton and Caledon East and Albion Township. As part of this restructuring, Peel County became Peel Region.

== Communities ==
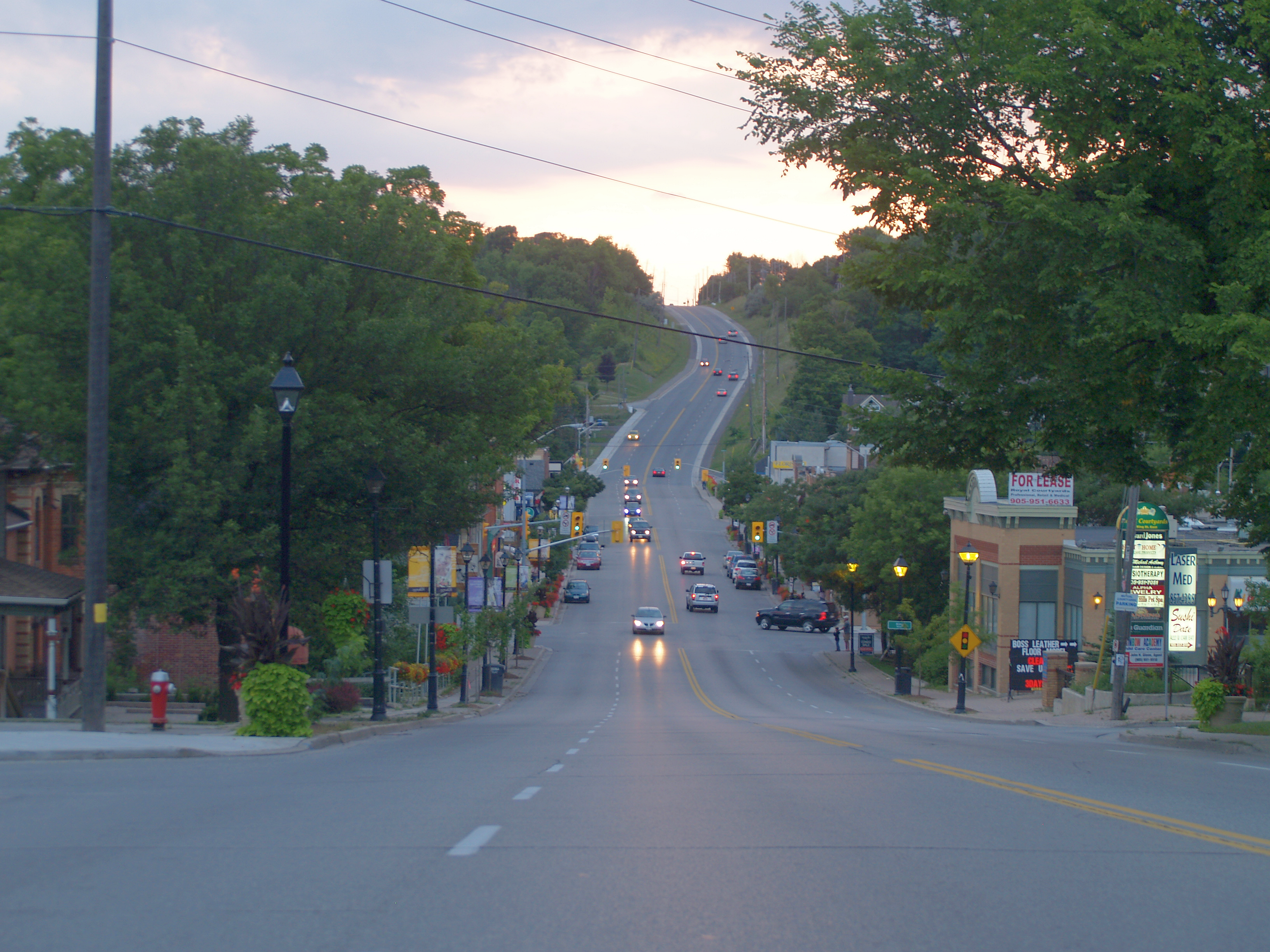
Bolton

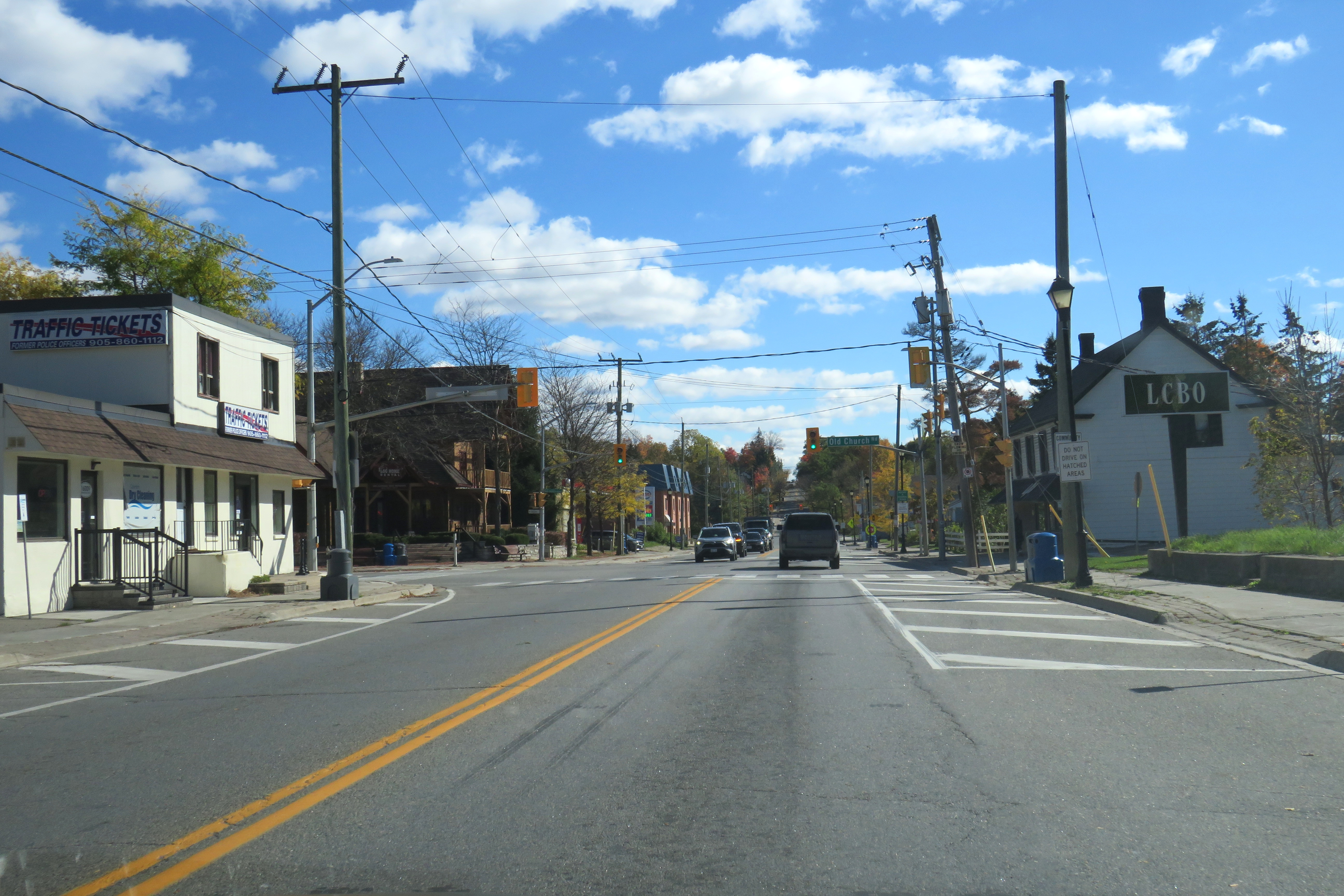
Caledon East

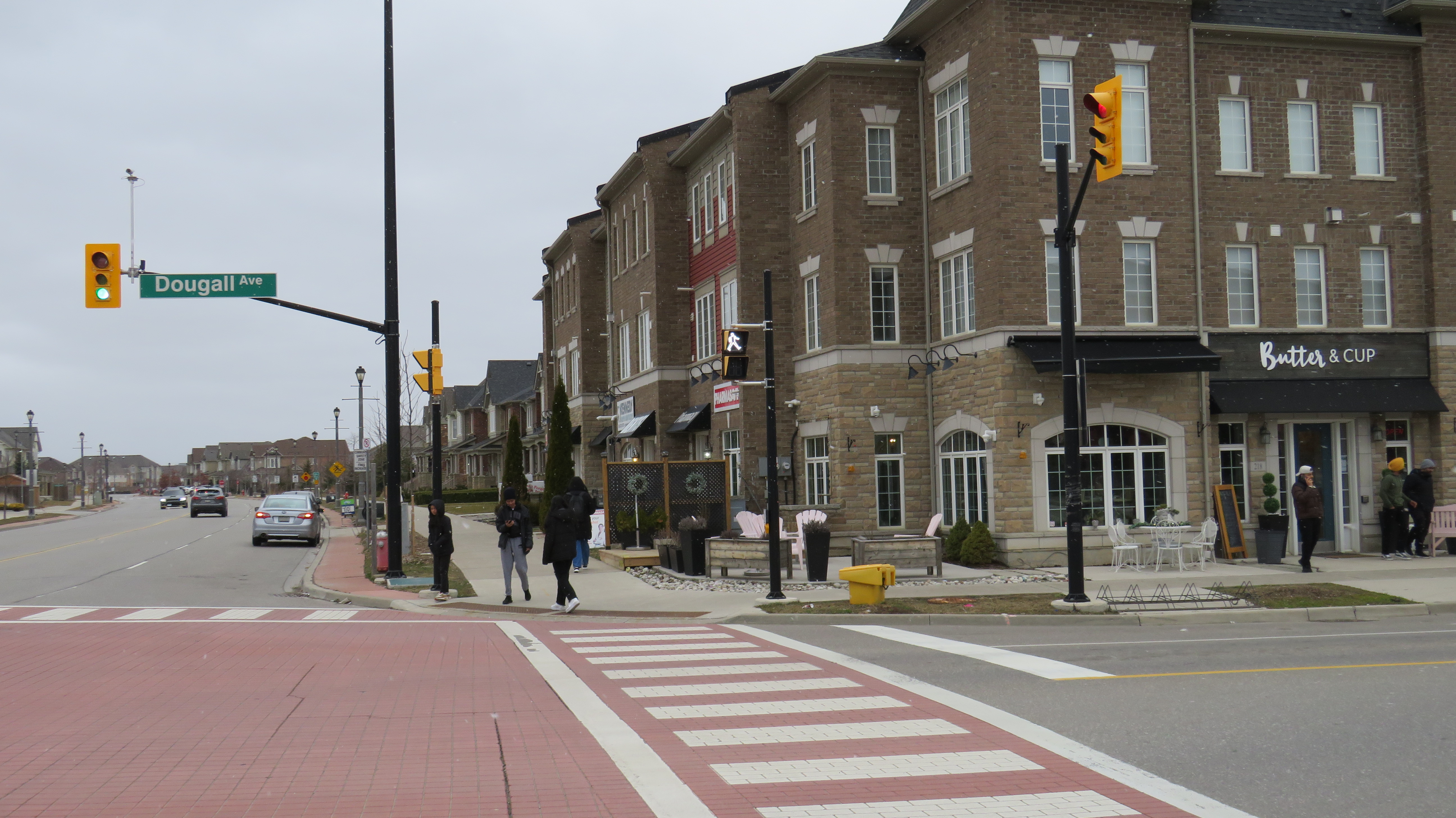
Mayfield West

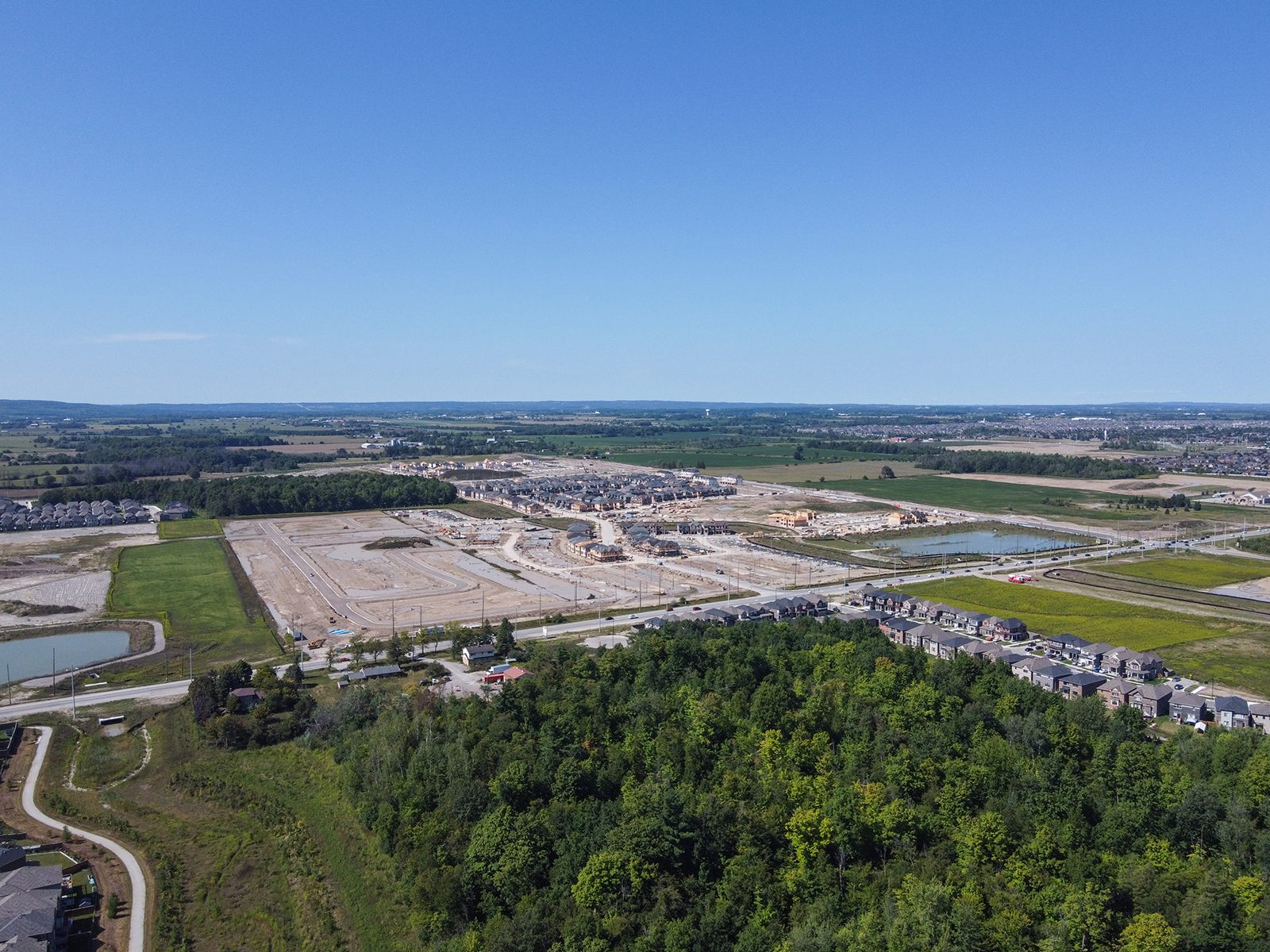
New housing development in the south of the town bordering Brampton

The primary administrative and commercial centre of Caledon is the community of Bolton, which the federal government estimated as having a population of 26,795 in 2021.

Aside from Bolton, other smaller communities in Caledon include the following:

- Rural service centres (i.e., larger hamlets, villages, or new residential developments): Caledon East, Mayfield West
- Villages: Alton, Belfountain, Caledon Village, Cheltenham, Inglewood, Mono Mills, Palgrave
- Hamlets: Albion, Alloa, Brimstone (Brimstone Point), Campbell's Cross, Cataract, Claude, Melville, Mono Road, Terra Cotta, Wildfield
- Industrial/commercial centres: Sandhill, Tullamore, Victoria
- Other localities: Boston Mills, Castlederg, Cedar Meadows, Cedar Mills, Coulterville, Coventry, Ferndale, Forks of the Credit, The Grange, Humber, Humber Grove, Kilmanagh, Lockton, Macville, McLeodville, Glasgow, Palgrave Estates, Rockside, Rosehill, Silver Creek, Sleswick, Sligo, Star, Stonehart, Taylorwoods, Tormore, Valleywood

The municipality is otherwise sparsely populated, mostly with farms.

=== Former localities ===
Former hamlets (ghost towns) include:

- Kennedy's Corners (Old School and Airport Roads)
- Fox's Corners (Willoughby Road and Charleston Side Road)
- Greenlaw (The Grange Sideroad and Winston Churchill Boulevard)
- Caldwell (The Grange Sideroad and Kennedy Road)
- Caldwell Junction (Olde Base Line and Mountainview Roads)
- “Old” Glasgow (Edelweiss Park/Humber Valley Heritage Trail)
- Glencoe's Corners (Olde Base Line and Creditview Roads)
- Mayfield (Mayfield and Dixie Roads). Area at Brampton boundary now undergoing urbanization.
- McBride's Corners (Olde Base Line Road and Highway 10)
- Ballycroy (Ballycroy Road and Highway 50)

== Demographics ==
Historical populations
Year	Pop.	±%
1981	26,645	—
1991	34,965	+31.2%
1996	39,893	+14.1%
2001	50,595	+26.8%
2006	57,050	+12.8%
2011	59,460	+4.2%
2016	66,502	+11.8%
2021	76,581	+15.2%
Source: Statistics Canada

In the 2021 Canadian census, conducted by Statistics Canada, Caledon had a population of 76,581 living in 23,699 of its 24,795 total private dwellings, a change of 15.2% from its 2016 population of 66,502. With a land area of 688.82 km^{2} (265.95 sq mi), it had a population density of 111.2/km^{2} (287.9/sq mi) in 2021.

In 2021, the median age was 40.8 years old, slightly lower than the provincial median of 41.6 years old. Caledon's population is made of 49.8% women and 50.2% men. There were 24,795 private dwellings. According to the 2011 National Household Survey, the median value of a dwelling in Caledon is $474,087, significantly higher than the national average of $280,552. The median household income (after-taxes) in Caledon is $83,454, much higher than the national average of $54,089. The average individual's income was $53,870.

=== Ethnicity ===
According to the 2021 Census, the largest five ethnic origins of the residents of Caledon are Italian (17,630; 23.2%), English (10,320; 13.6%), Indian (9,120; 12.0%), Scottish (8,270; 10.9%), and Canadian (8,095; 10.6%).

66.3% of Caledon residents were white/European, 32.8% were visible minorities, and 0.8% were Indigenous. The largest visible minority groups were South Asian (21.4%), Black (3.6%), Latin American (1.7%), Chinese (1.0%) and Filipino (1.0%)

Panethnic groups in the Town of Caledon (2001−2021)
Panethnic group	2021		2016		2011		2006		2001	
Panethnic group	Pop.	%	Pop.	%	Pop.	%	Pop.	%	Pop.	%
European (Note: Statistic includes all persons that did not make up part of a visible minority or an indigenous identity.)	50,450	66.31%	53,195	80.34%	52,820	89.56%	52,385	92.16%	47,710	94.74%
South Asian	16,310	21.44%	6,635	10.02%	1,995	3.38%	1,265	2.23%	700	1.39%
African	2,770	3.64%	1,880	2.84%	1,205	2.04%	860	1.51%	770	1.53%
Latin American	1,310	1.72%	905	1.37%	600	1.02%	480	0.84%	175	0.35%
Southeast Asian (Note: Statistic includes total responses of "Filipino" and "Southeast Asian" under visible minority section on census.)	1,105	1.45%	730	1.1%	495	0.84%	395	0.69%	80	0.16%
Middle Eastern (Note: Statistic includes total responses of "West Asian" and "Arab" under visible minority section on census.)	1,060	1.39%	495	0.75%	300	0.51%	175	0.31%	255	0.51%
East Asian (Note: Statistic includes total responses of "Chinese", "Korean", and "Japanese" under visible minority section on census.)	975	1.28%	900	1.36%	620	1.05%	525	0.92%	365	0.72%
Indigenous	620	0.81%	615	0.93%	450	0.76%	360	0.63%	145	0.29%
Other/multiracial (Note: Statistic includes total responses of "Visible minority, n.i.e." and "Multiple visible minorities" under visible minority section on census.)	1,490	1.96%	855	1.29%	495	0.84%	390	0.69%	175	0.35%
Total responses	76,085	99.35%	66,215	99.57%	58,975	99.18%	56,840	99.63%	50,360	99.52%
Total population	76,581	100%	66,502	100%	59,460	100%	57,050	100%	50,605	100%
Note: Totals greater than 100% due to multiple origin responses

=== Language ===
English is the mother tongue of 65.4% of the residents of Caledon. Native speakers of Punjabi make up 11.1% of the town's population, Italian 5.4%, Portuguese 1.4%, Spanish 1.3%, and Polish 1.0%.

=== Religion ===
As of 2021, 58.5% of Caledon's population was Christian, down from 77.5% in 2011. 38.2% of residents were Catholic, 10.5% were Protestant, 6.0% were Christian without precision, 1.8% were Christian Orthodox, and 2.0% belonged to other Christian denominations or Christian-related traditions; 19.3% of the population was non-religious or secular, up from 18.6% in 2011. All other religions and spiritual traditions accounted for 22.2% of the population, up from 3.9% in 2011. They included Sikhism (14.3%), Hinduism (4.7%), Islam (2.1%), Buddhism (0.5%), and Judaism (0.4%).

Religious groups in the Town of Caledon (1991−2021)
Religious group	2021		2011		2001		1991	
Religious group	Pop.	%	Pop.	%	Pop.	%	Pop.	%
Christian	44,495	58.48%	45,685	77.47%	41,720	82.84%	29,440	84.66%
Sikh	10,865	14.28%	1,175	1.99%	375	0.74%	105	0.3%
Hindu	3,545	4.66%	495	0.84%	165	0.33%	65	0.19%
Muslim	1,580	2.08%	215	0.36%	160	0.32%	115	0.33%
Buddhist	365	0.48%	90	0.15%	45	0.09%	35	0.1%
Jewish	280	0.37%	180	0.31%	115	0.23%	90	0.26%
Other religion	290	0.38%	150	0.25%	125	0.25%	30	0.09%
Irreligious	14,665	19.27%	10,975	18.61%	7,650	15.19%	4,885	14.05%
Total responses	76,085	99.35%	58,975	99.18%	50,360	99.54%	34,775	99.46%

== Government ==
The town is run by a mayor, six town councillors and two regional councillors. The mayor and the two regional councillors represent Caledon at the Region of Peel:

- Mayor Annette Groves
- Councillor Ward 1 Lynn Kiernan
- Councillor Ward 2 Dave Sheen
- Councillor Ward 3 Doug Maskell
- Councillor Ward 4 Nick deBoer
- Councillor Ward 5 Tony Rosa
- Councillor Ward 6 Cosimo Napoli
- Regional Councillor Wards 1, 2, 3 Christina Early
- Regional Councillor Wards 4, 5, 6 Mario Russo

Per capita, Caledon has by far the largest representation on Peel Regional Council of the three municipalities, however Caledon's land mass exceeds that of Mississauga and Brampton combined.

== Climate ==
Climate data for Albion Field Centre (Albion Township and Caledon) Climate ID: 6150103; coordinates 43°55′N 79°50′W; elevation: 281.9 m (925 ft); 1981–2010 normals, extremes 1969–2001
Month	Jan	Feb	Mar	Apr	May	Jun	Jul	Aug	Sep	Oct	Nov	Dec	Year
Record high °C (°F)	12.0 (53.6)	14.5 (58.1)	24.5 (76.1)	30.0 (86.0)	33.0 (91.4)	34.5 (94.1)	36.1 (97.0)	35.0 (95.0)	34.4 (93.9)	30.6 (87.1)	22.2 (72.0)	19.5 (67.1)	36.1 (97.0)
Mean daily maximum °C (°F)	−2.8 (27.0)	−1.4 (29.5)	3.7 (38.7)	11.6 (52.9)	18.8 (65.8)	23.7 (74.7)	26.3 (79.3)	25.1 (77.2)	19.9 (67.8)	13.2 (55.8)	5.8 (42.4)	−0.3 (31.5)	12.0 (53.6)
Daily mean °C (°F)	−7.0 (19.4)	−5.9 (21.4)	−1.4 (29.5)	6.1 (43.0)	12.4 (54.3)	17.3 (63.1)	19.9 (67.8)	19.1 (66.4)	14.3 (57.7)	8.1 (46.6)	2.1 (35.8)	−3.9 (25.0)	6.7 (44.1)
Mean daily minimum °C (°F)	−11.2 (11.8)	−10.4 (13.3)	−6.6 (20.1)	0.5 (32.9)	5.9 (42.6)	10.9 (51.6)	13.5 (56.3)	13.0 (55.4)	8.6 (47.5)	2.9 (37.2)	−1.7 (28.9)	−7.4 (18.7)	1.5 (34.7)
Record low °C (°F)	−36.5 (−33.7)	−35.0 (−31.0)	−31.5 (−24.7)	−21.1 (−6.0)	−6.1 (21.0)	−1.5 (29.3)	1.7 (35.1)	−0.5 (31.1)	−5.0 (23.0)	−11.5 (11.3)	−19.0 (−2.2)	−32.0 (−25.6)	−36.5 (−33.7)
Average precipitation mm (inches)	60.4 (2.38)	50.2 (1.98)	50.3 (1.98)	67.0 (2.64)	76.1 (3.00)	75.5 (2.97)	81.8 (3.22)	77.4 (3.05)	75.0 (2.95)	68.3 (2.69)	81.7 (3.22)	57.7 (2.27)	821.5 (32.34)
Average rainfall mm (inches)	24.0 (0.94)	22.2 (0.87)	27.3 (1.07)	63.0 (2.48)	76.1 (3.00)	75.5 (2.97)	81.8 (3.22)	77.4 (3.05)	75.0 (2.95)	64.9 (2.56)	67.8 (2.67)	25.9 (1.02)	681.0 (26.81)
Average snowfall cm (inches)	36.4 (14.3)	28.0 (11.0)	23.0 (9.1)	4.0 (1.6)	0.0 (0.0)	0.0 (0.0)	0.0 (0.0)	0.0 (0.0)	0.0 (0.0)	3.4 (1.3)	13.8 (5.4)	31.9 (12.6)	140.5 (55.3)
Average precipitation days (≥ 0.2 mm)	12.4	9.4	9.6	10.8	10.3	10.2	9.0	9.8	10.8	11.3	12.1	9.8	125.5
Average rainy days (≥ 0.2 mm)	3.3	3.6	5.2	9.9	10.3	10.2	9.0	9.8	10.8	11.2	9.3	3.7	96.2
Average snowy days (≥ 0.2 cm)	9.8	6.4	5.3	1.4	0.1	0.0	0.0	0.0	0.0	0.6	4.0	6.8	34.3
Source: Environment and Climate Change Canada

== Education ==
The Peel District School Board operates 14 public schools and two secondary (high) schools in Caledon. The Dufferin-Peel Catholic District School Board operates several Catholic elementary/middle and two secondary schools. The Conseil scolaire catholique MonAvenir operates one Catholic francophone (first-language French) elementary school. There also several private and Montessori schools.

=== School (location in community) ===
- Allan Drive Middle School (Bolton)
- Alloa Public School (Alloa)
- Alton Public School (Alton)
- Belfountain Public School (Belfountain)
- Brampton Christian School (Mayfield West)
- Caledon Central Public School (Caledon Village)
- Caledon East Public School (Caledon East)
- Countryside Montessori and Private School
- Creative Children's Montessori School (Bolton)
- École élémentaire catholique Saint-Jean-Bosco (Mayfield West)
- Ellwood Memorial Public School (Bolton)
- Herb Campbell Public School (Campbell's Cross)
- Headwater Hills Montessori School
- The Hill Academy
- Holy Family Elementary School (Bolton)
- Humberview Secondary School (Bolton)
- King's College School
- James Bolton Public School (Bolton)
- James Grieve Public School (Tullamore)
- Macville Public School (Bolton)
- Mayfield Secondary School
- Mind Valley Montessori and Private School (Bolton)
- Palgrave Public School (Palgrave)
- St. Evan Catholic Elementary School (Mayfield West)
- St. John Paul II Elementary School (Bolton)
- Robert F. Hall Catholic Secondary School (Caledon East)
- SouthFields Village Public School (Mayfield West)
- St. Cornelius Elementary School (Caledon East)
- St. John the Baptist Elementary School (Bolton)
- St. Nicholas Elementary School (Bolton)
- St Michael Catholic Secondary School (Bolton)
- Tony Pontes Public School (Mayfield West)

== Emergency services ==
Caledon Fire & Emergency Services provides firefighting (using both career and volunteer firefighters), and medical emergency services. It has nine stations.

Ambulance service is run by the regional government's Peel Regional Paramedic Services, with three stations (#10, 11 and 12).

Despite being part of Peel Region, Caledon has its policing conducted from Ontario Provincial Police Caledon Detachment, rather than Peel Regional Police. The OPP also patrols the provincial highways in Caledon.

== Transportation ==
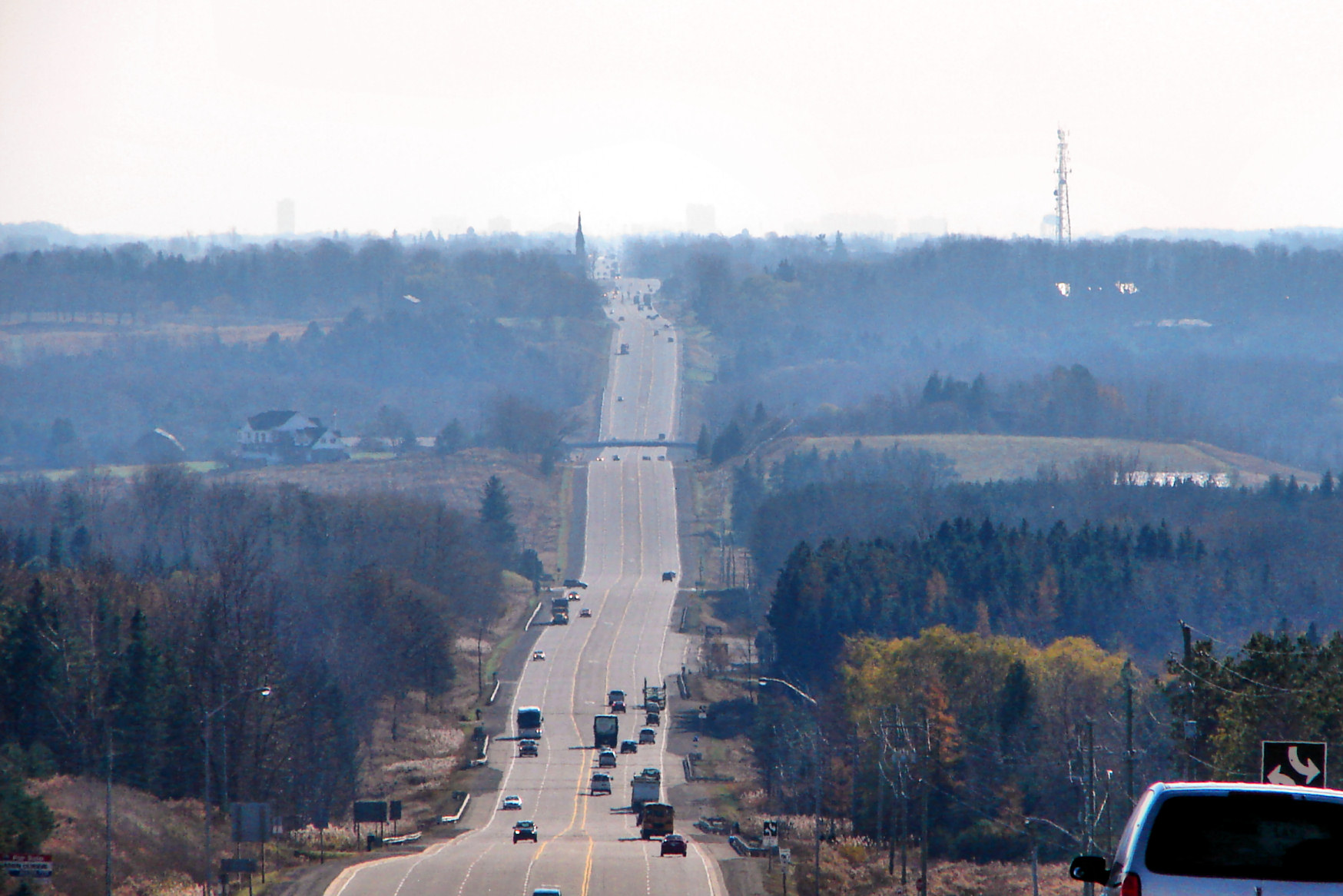
Highway 10 through Caledon

=== Highways/roads ===
Highways in the municipality:

- Highway 10 (Hurontario Street)
- Highway 410 (southerly continuation of Highway 10)

Former highways (now Regional roads):

- Charleston Sideroad or Peel Road 24 (formerly Highway 24 west of Highway 10)
- Peel Road 50 (formerly Highway 50)
- Peel Road 136 (formerly Highway 136)

Though never a provincial highway, Airport Road (Peel Road 7), is a major north-south route to and from the Georgian Triangle for travellers from southern Peel.

=== Public transit ===
==== GO Transit ====
GO Transit operates two bus routes in Caledon:

- serving Bolton along Highway 50 and through east Mississauga and connecting with Malton GO Station on the Kitchener line.
- serving Orangeville and Brampton and connecting with Brampton GO Station on the Georgetown line via Highway 10 and Brampton's Main Street.

==== Local transit ====
Due to its largely rural nature, Caledon does not have its own transit system; however, Brampton Transit provides a rush hour-only bus line, 41 Bolton in Bolton and travels south down Highway 50 in to Queen Street/Highway 7 (at the border of Brampton and Vaughan) to make connections with other Brampton Transit routes and York Region Transit (YRT). Brampton Transit also operates three other routes short distances into suburban areas bordering Brampton within the town: Route 81 Mayfield West serves Kennedy Road in Mayfield West, and Routes 18 Dixie and 30 Airport Road provide limited service into industrial areas.

Paratransit services for the elderly, disabled, and infirm are provided by Caledon Community Services Transportation and Transhelp. Both are run by the Region of Peel Accessible Transportation Services.

==== History ====
There were two earlier privately-operated transit services running solely within Bolton with no connections to other services: In 1999 a company named Caledon Transit Incorporated ran a trial bus service in the community. In 2006, the growing population of Bolton prompted local resident Darren Parberry to start a second bus service with two routes using leased school buses, called Métis Transit. One route ran briefly in 2006. Both services ceased operations due to low ridership. Between 2019 and 2024, there was a third service, operated by a private contractor, Voyago, which provided the Bolton line bus service in Bolton and traveled south down Highway 50 to Queen Street/Highway 7 to connect with Brampton Transit and YRT until it was replaced by the current Brampton Transit Route 41 on May 1, 2024. Adult cash fares were $4.00 and there were no free transfers with these systems.

== Culture ==
The Alton Mill Arts Centre is located in the community of Alton. Art galleries include Headwaters Arts and Peel Art Gallery, Museum and Archives.

=== Media ===
Established in 1888 as the Cardwell Observer, The Caledon Enterprise is published weekly from Bolton by Metroland Media. Also based out of Bolton is The Caledon Citizen, established in 1982. A MELINIUM paper, it is published by Caledon Publishing Ltd. A third newspaper, launched by Rick and Shelly Sargent in 2010, The Regional, was published monthly in Bolton. In November 2012, the paper was acquired by Caledon Publishing and ceased publication. The Sargents began working with the Caledon Citizen.

In January 2015 an online publication specific to Caledon, JustSayinCaledon.com, was started by former Bolton Ward 5 Regional Councilor Patti Foley. It publishes stories about local residents and businesses, Caledon event listings, town council highlights, opinion pieces, and a food section about local markets and restaurants.

A short-lived student-run newspaper, The Caledon Underground, was published in 2010.

The creepypasta 1999 depicts a fictional television station based in Caledon, called Caledon Local 21, which was on the air from 1997 to 1999 in the broadcast area of stations in the Greater Toronto Area and Hamilton.

Key Porter Books and its parent H.B. Fenn are headquartered in Bolton. The radio stations CJFB-FM and CFGM-FM are broadcasting from here.

=== Historic sites ===
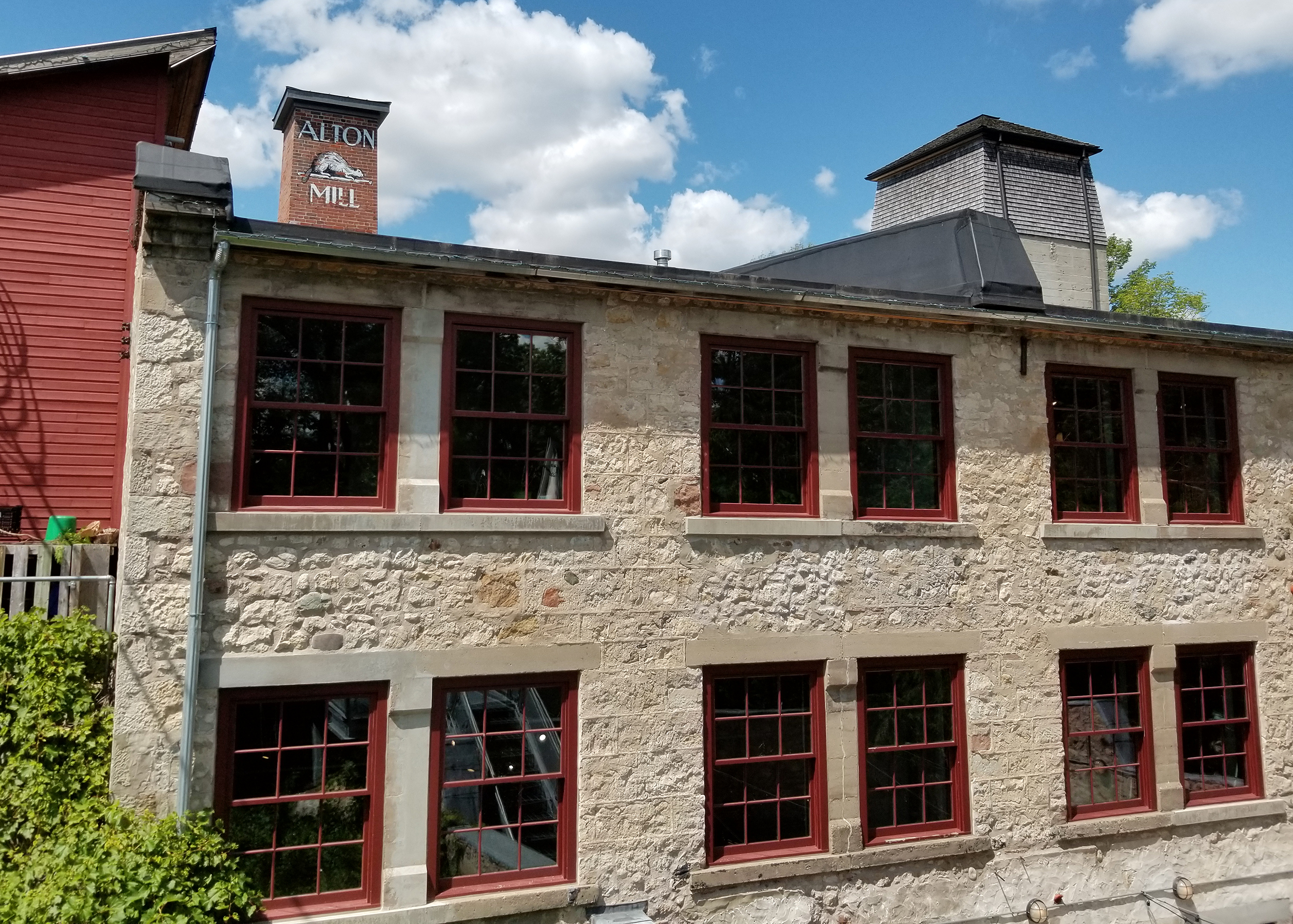
Back of the Alton Mill

- Old Township Hall (Caledon Village; built c.1875, now used as a theatre)
- Millcroft Inn (Alton; woollen mill, built in 1881, now a hotel)
- Alton Mill (Alton; woollen mill, c.1881, now an arts centre)
- Brick Work Ruins (Cheltenham)
- Humber River (designated as a Canadian Heritage River)
- Great War Flying Museum (at Brampton-Caledon Airport)
- Hair Pin Turn (Beside the Credit River)

=== Trails ===
- Andrew's Treasure Trail
- Bruce Trail
- Caledon Trailway
- Elora-Cataract Trail
- Grand Valley Trail
- Humber Valley Trail
- Oak Ridges Trail

=== Organizations ===
- Freemasonry
- Caledon Ski Club
- Kinsmen Club Christmas Parade
- Columbian Squires
- Knights of Columbus

=== Protected areas ===
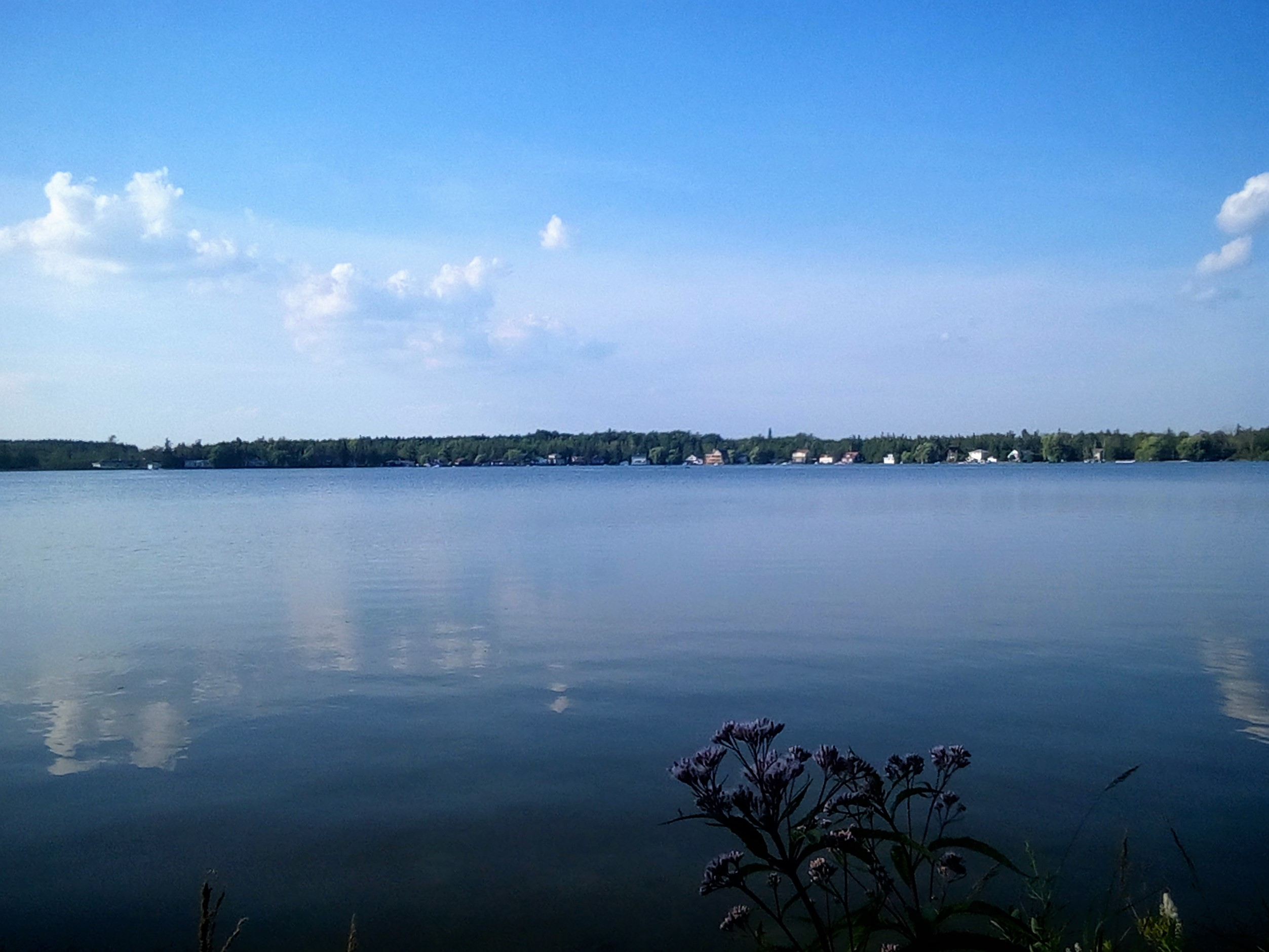
Caledon Lake lies in the headwaters of the Credit River.

- Albion Hills Conservation Area
- Alton Grange Property
- Belfountain Conservation Area
- Caledon Lake Forest Conservation Area
- Forks of the Credit Provincial Park
- Glen Haffy Conservation Area
- Ken Whillans Conservation Area
- Palgrave Forest and Wildlife Area
- Robert Baker Forest Conservation Area
- Terra Cotta Conservation Area
- Warwick Conservation Area

=== Sports and recreation ===
Junior hockey teams include the Caledon Admirals (Jr. A), Caledon Bombers (Jr. B) and the Caledon Golden Hawks (Jr. C). The Caledon Canadians are now defunct.

Minor hockey teams include the Caledon Hawks and the Caledon Coyotes.

Lacrosse in Caledon is represented by the Caledon Vaughan Minor Lacrosse Association, which operates Minor Field and both minor and junior C box teams.

Mike Fox, the winner of the 2007 Queen's Plate, was foaled in Caledon, and Peaks and Valleys currently stands there.

Caledon Equestrian Park, in Palgrave, hosted the equestrian events of the 2015 Pan American Games.

== See also ==
- Media in Peel
- List of townships in Ontario

== Sources ==
- "Caledon, Ontario (Code 3521024) Census Profile". 2011 census. Government of Canada - Statistics Canada.
