= Caledon Lake =

Lake in Caledon, Ontario, Canada

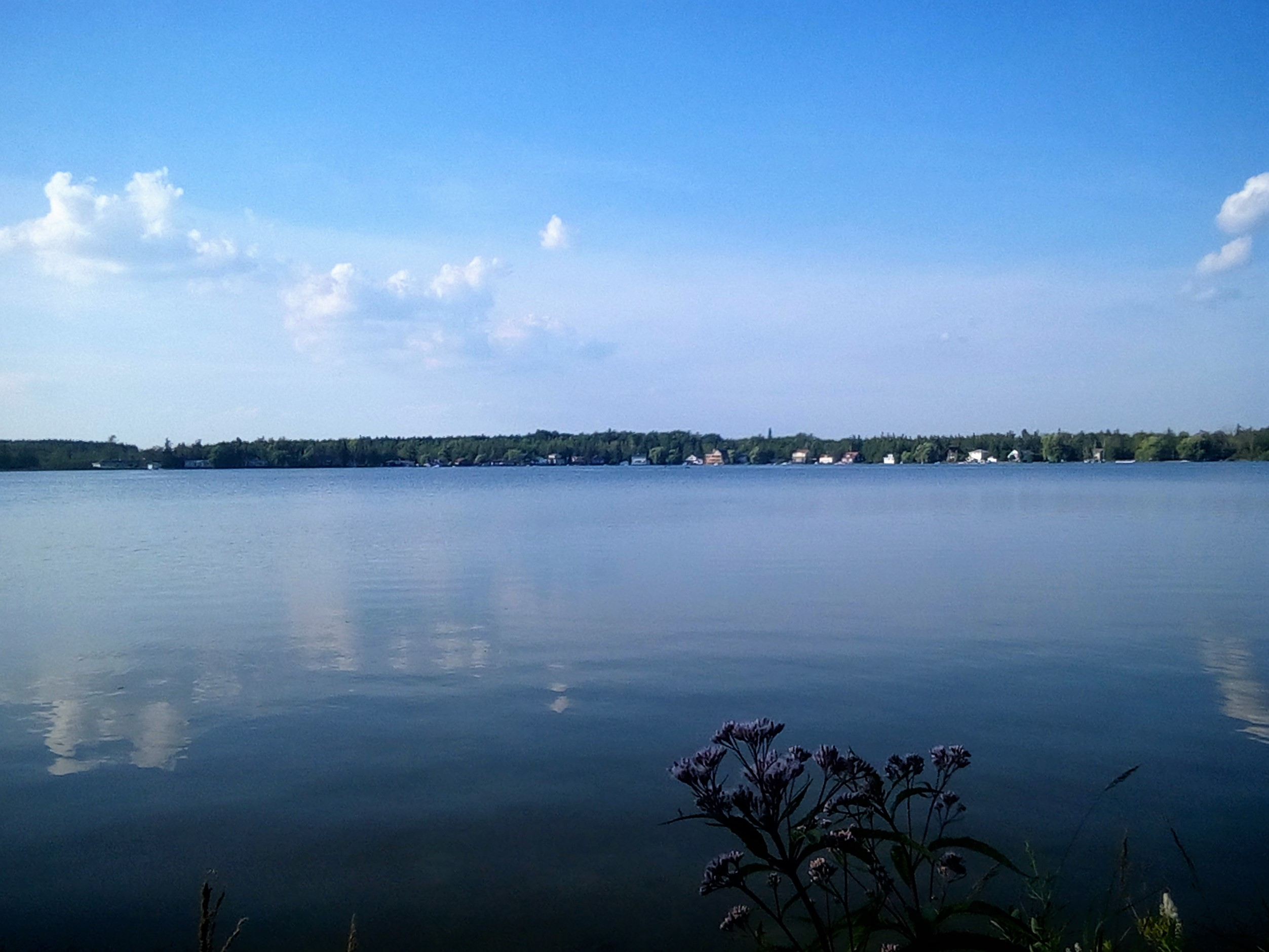
- Caledon Lake

- Location within Ontario
- Location: Caledon, Ontario
- Coordinates: 43.880534°N 80.106006°W

Caledon Lake is a lake in Caledon, Peel Region, Ontario, Canada. Caledon Lake is within the Greater Toronto Area Greenbelt.
