= Caledon Village =

- Unincorporated community
- Interactive map of Caledon Village
- Coordinates: 43°51′37.4″N 79°59′45.0″W
- Country: Canada
- Province: Ontario
- Regional Municipality: Regional Municipality of Peel
- Town: Caledon
- First established: 1820

Population
  - Total: 1,909

Caledon Village is an unincorporated community located within the largely-rural Town of Caledon in Ontario, Canada. It has a population of 1,909 people.

== Description ==
Caledon Village is a largely-rural community in the centre of Caledon, situated at the intersection of Highway 10 (Hurontario Street) and Charleston Sideroad (Peel Road 24; and formerly Highway 24 west of Highway 10). There are quarries for the extraction of salt, gravel, and sand around the village. The large quarries serve as a large portion of the Caledon economy and stretch to the Forks of the Credit and the hamlet of Cataract.

== History ==
The community was first established in the 1820s by Irish and Scottish emigrants of the Stubbs, Rayburn, and Bell families. The village was formerly known as Raeburn's Corners, Charlestown, Charleston, and (simply) Caledon (although the former township in which the community had been located was always named "Caledon"). The area flourished with industries like sawmills and gristmills, powered by the nearby Credit River. The main form of economic activity ties to agriculture and poultry.

For most of its history, Caledon Village was a hamlet (rather than an actual village), with the majority of the growth in the community having occurred in modern times. Most of the population now lives in suburban-style developments. There are ongoing small residential and industrial development plans around the village.
