= Alloa, Ontario =

Alloa
- Unincorporated community
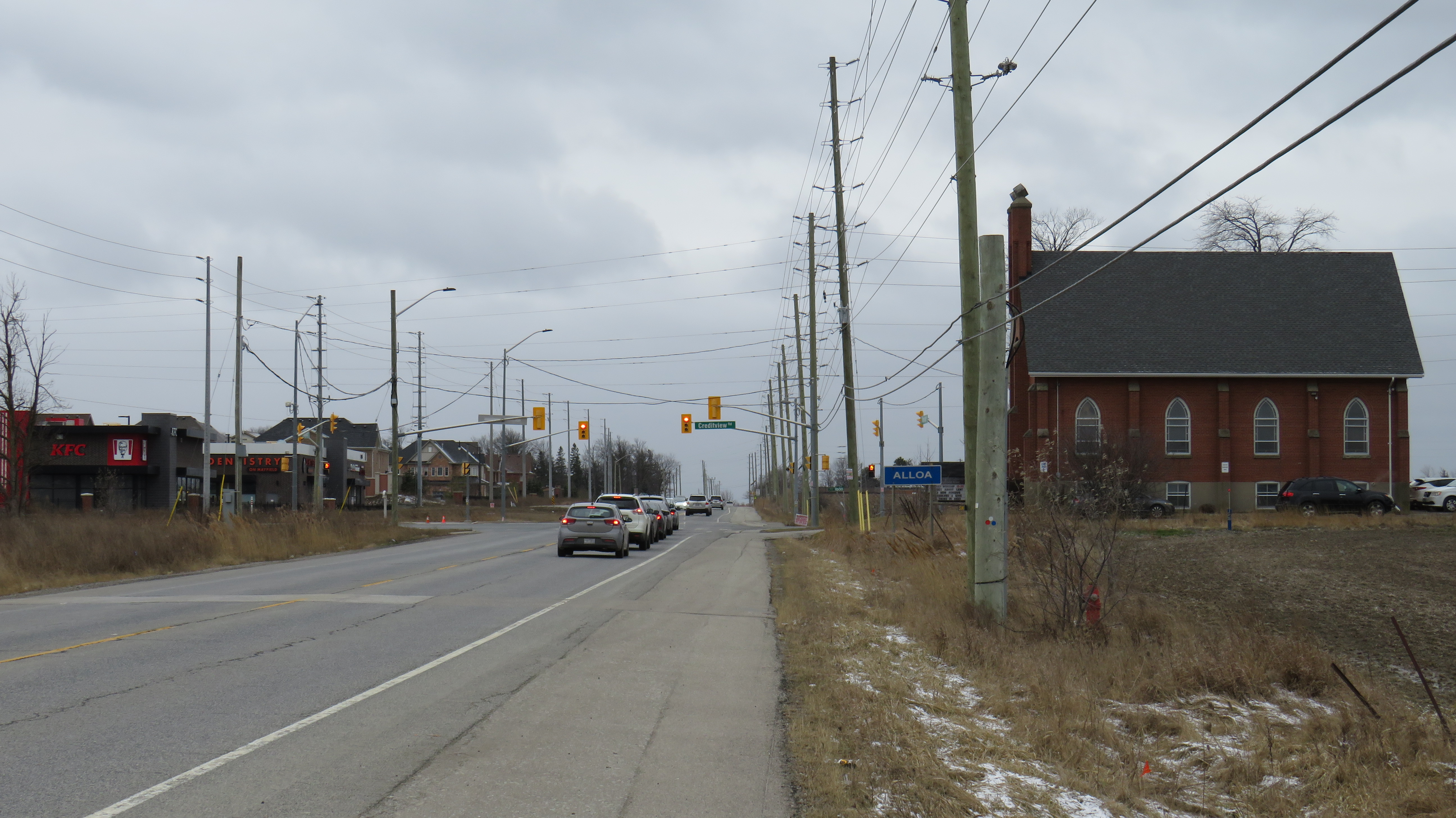
- Alloa in 2024
- Interactive map of Alloa
- Country: Canada
- Province: Ontario
- Geographic township: Chinguacousy
- City/Town: Brampton and Caledon
- First Noted: 1789
- First Settled: 1880

Alloa is a semi-rural hamlet located on the boundary of the City of Brampton and the Town of Caledon in Ontario, Canada. It is within the geographic township of Chinguacousy.

== Geography ==
Alloa is situated at the corner of Creditview and Mayfield Roads. The larger communities of Snelgrove and Mayfield West are located east of the hamlet; with the former part of Brampton, and the latter Caledon. To the south lies the Brampton neighbourhood of Mount Pleasant. As of early 2024, the Brampton side is now mostly urbanized. The community contains the Alloa Public School.

== History ==
Alloa was first settled in 1880, mainly by immigrants from Scottish and Irish descent. The hamlet prioritized the agriculture of grain. There were plans announced in 2013, for the development of Alloa into a high-tech urban community, which would include a technological and salubrious based business park and industry district. It would also comprise a new GO rail Station. However, progress has currently stalled on the project as the town is managing developments in other areas to control population growth. Development on the Brampton side began in the mid-2010s, with a retail plaza being opened in 2021/22 at the corner of Mayfield and Creditview.
