= Caledon East =

- Caledon
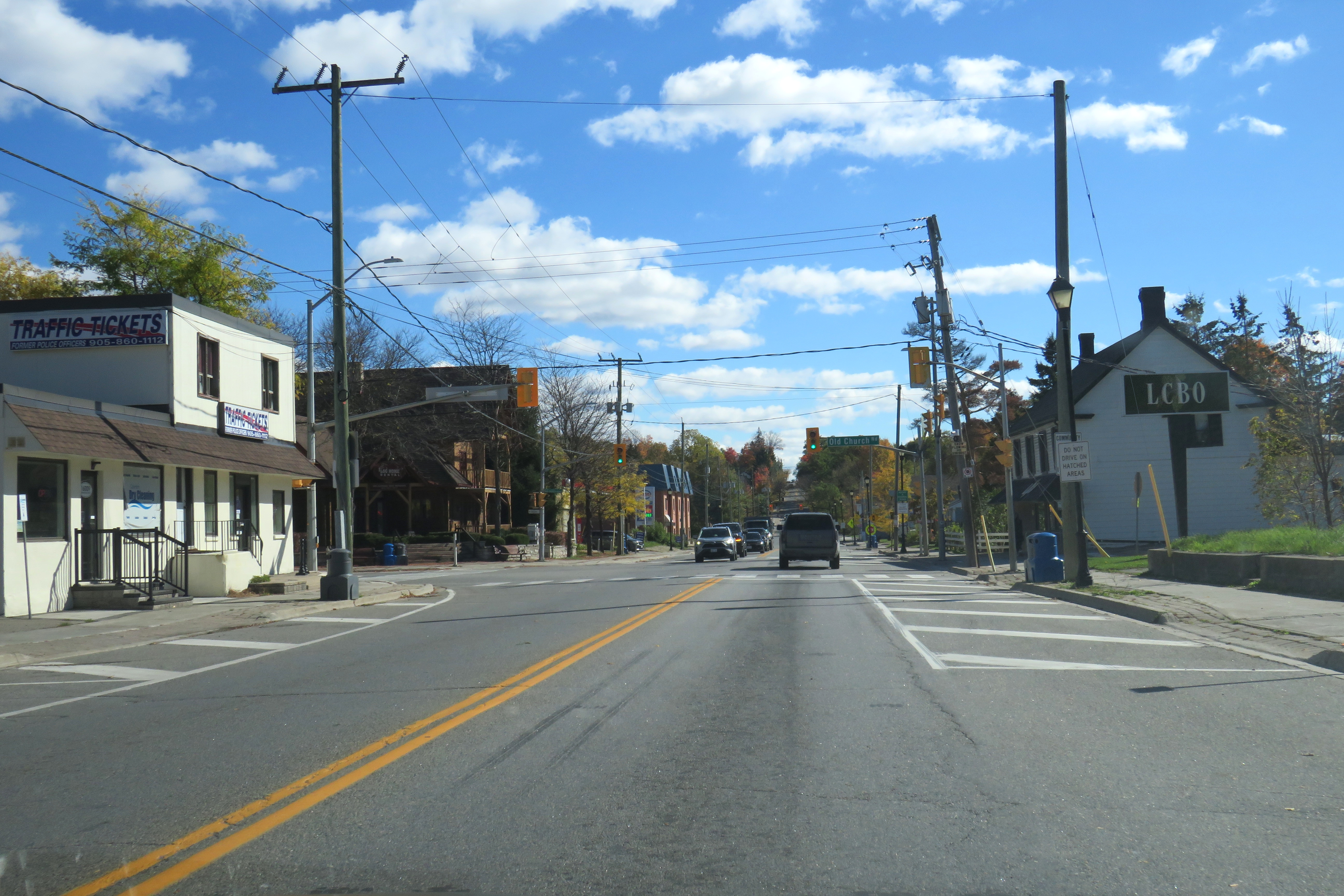
- Airport Road in Caledon East
- Interactive map of Caledon East
- Coordinates: 43°52′11″N 79°52′00″W
- Country: Canada
- Province: Ontario
- Regional Municipality: Peel
- Town: Caledon
- Settled: 1821

Area
  - Total: 6.435 km^{2} (2.485 sq mi)

Population
  - Total: 5,775
  - Density: 690/km^{2} (1,800/sq mi)

Caledon East is an unincorporated community located within the Town of Caledon, Ontario, Canada, within the Regional Municipality of Peel. It has a population of 5,575.

== Geography ==
Caledon East is located in Ward 3 of Caledon, northwest of Bolton on Airport Road, a major route between southern Peel Region and the Georgian Triangle. The area is surrounded by wetlands and marshes, and is home to small rivers and lakes.

== History ==
The community was first settled in 1821. In 1877, a train station was built in the village along the Northern Railway of Canada. By the next few years, five trains stopped daily at the station. Due to unknown reasons, the station was relocated in 1903. In 1971, the station was demolished, and much of the rail right-of-way became the Caledon Trailway.

The community became a police village, which gave it partial independence, in 1957. However, in 1974, following the dissolution and reduction of 10 municipalities to three in Peel Region, including Mississauga and Brampton, Caledon absorbed many small communities, including Caledon East.

Currently, the community has many development plans in the north, south and west. In September 2023, a new community centre opened offering recreational amenities such a fitness gym and a spa.
