= Inglewood, Ontario =

Inglewood
- Village
- Interactive map of Inglewood
- Country: Canada
- Province: Ontario
- Regional Municipality: Peel
- Town: Caledon
- Settled: 1883
- Elevation: 271 m (889 ft)

Population
  - Total: 1,175
  - Density: 227/km^{2} (590/sq mi)
- Postal code: L7C___

Inglewood is a village located within the town of Caledon, in Peel, Ontario, Canada. It has a population of 1 175 people.

== Geography ==
Inglewood is situated near the Niagara Escarpment. Its landscape features small hills, farmland, and the Credit River, offering opportunities for outdoor activities like hiking and fishing and the agriculture industry. The elevation is 271 meters above sea level.

== History ==
A general store and a railway hotel are shown on the original village plan of Inglewood in 1883, the first two commercial enterprises to be built. Both buildings still stand today. In the 1800s, Inglewood underwent several name changes such as Sligo South and Riverdale. In 1885, Thomas White, a member of Parliament, proposed the name Inglewood, inspired by a forest in Cumberland, England, which became the official name in 1886. Known for its woolen mill and stone quarry, Inglewood experienced growth with the construction of the north western-railway railway in the 1870s, leading to the development of many houses and buildings from locally harvested wood, some of which still stand today. The history of Inglewood's railway begins in 1877 when the Hamilton & North-Western Railway, passing through what was then known as Sligo, was joined by the Credit Valley Railway in 1879. Following a merger, the Northern & North Western Railway built the first station in 1880, leading to the settlement's growth. Acquired by the Grand Trunk Railway in 1888, the line saw reductions in service over the years, particularly after the nationalization of the railways in 1923. Passenger service declined with the advent of automobiles, culminating in the closure of the Canadian National line in 1960 and the cessation of all passenger services by 1970. Today, the former railway lines serve as recreational trails, marking the end of an era in Inglewood's transportation history. The station which was built within the village was demolished in 1971.
