= Alton, Ontario =

Alton
- Community
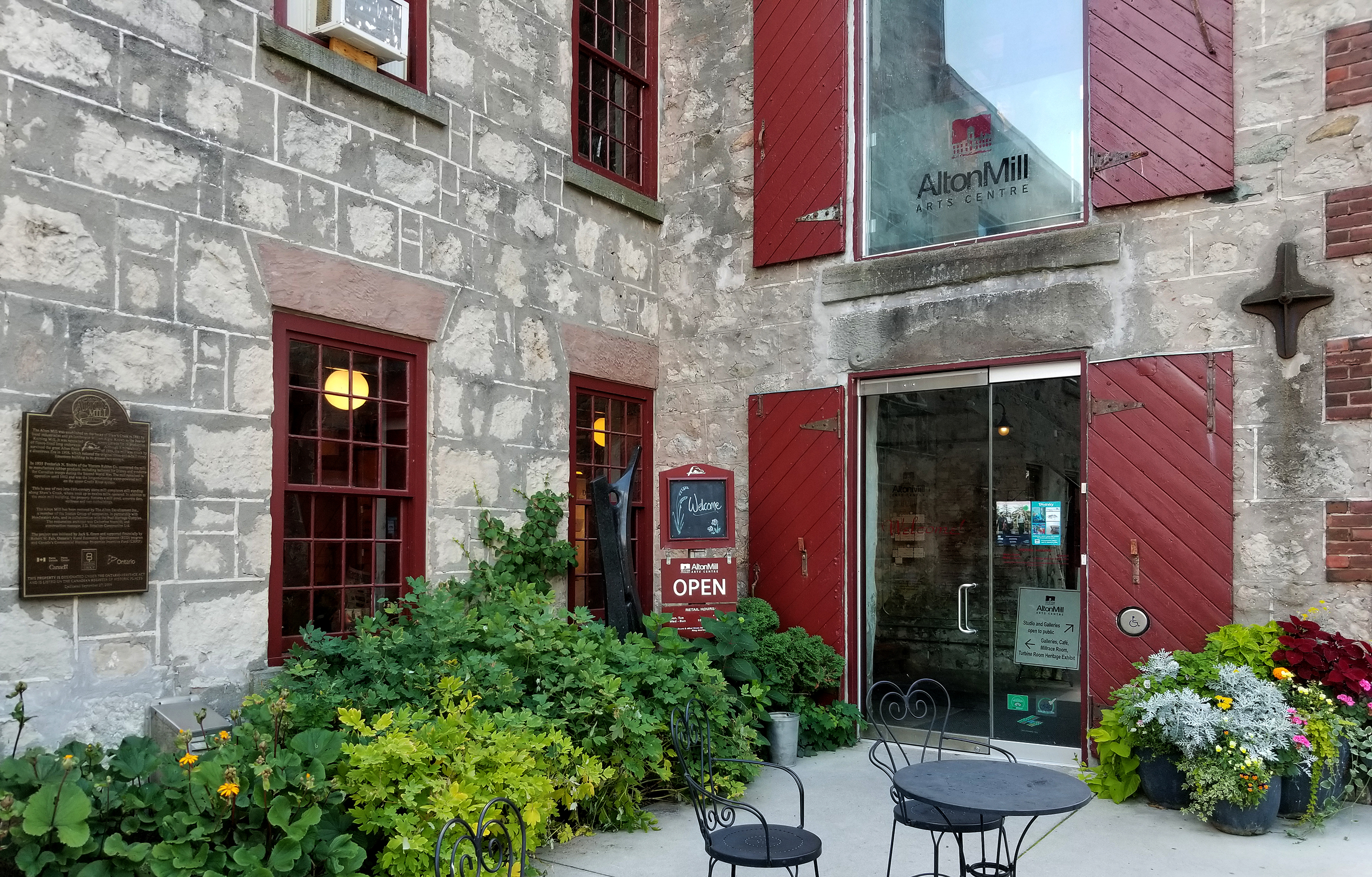
- Entrance of Alton Mill Centre

- Location of Alton within Canada Alton (Canada)
- Coordinates: 43°51′37″N 80°04′7″W
- Country: Canada
- Province: Ontario
- Regional Municipality: Regional Municipality of Peel
- Town: Caledon
- Established: 1820

Population
  - Total: 1,116
- Postal code: L0N 1A0

Alton is a community located in Caledon, Ontario. It is also part of the Region of Peel. It was established in 1820. Alton has a population of 1,116 people.

== History ==
Alton was originally settled in the 1816 by Martin Middaugh Jr, a United Empire Loyalist who received a 200-acre land grant from the Crown, likely for military service. In the ensuing years a hamlet emerged thanks to a prosperous milling operation on Shaw Creek a tributary of the Credit River. In 1852 with the population growing this community needed a post office and therefore an official name. A town hall meeting was held to come up with a name. John Meek, son of Robert Meek who owned the popular general store in the village suggested the name Alton, as he held in hand a newspaper from Alton, Illinois and it was chosen as the name of the village. The new post office opened in 1854. Soon after, Meek opened Alton’s first hotel. Alton prospered thanks to the mills which powered a number of different industries over the year. Alton was built up largely between the 1850s and early 1900s. Prior to its amalgamation into the Town of Caledon, Alton was a police village similarly to other villages located within Caledon, such as Caledon Village. There were also several mills built throughout the village, and for a considerable period of time, it was the main form of economic activity from Alton, likewise to Bolton.

== Geography ==
Map of Alton (1877)

Alton is located near the Caledon Creek and the Alton Pond, where the Millcroft Inn is located upon. It is also located on the banks of Shaw's Creek. An old 1-track rail line lies at the east end of the community. New houses are currently being built west of Main Street (Peel Regional Road 136), as part of the Ospey Mills Community. The Niagara Escarpment runs north of the community.

== Places of interest ==
- Alton Mill Arts Centre
- Millcroft Inn and Spa
- TPC Toronto at Osprey Valley
- Paul Morin Gallery
