= Forks of the Credit Provincial Park =

Provincial park in Ontario, Canada

- IUCN category II (national park)
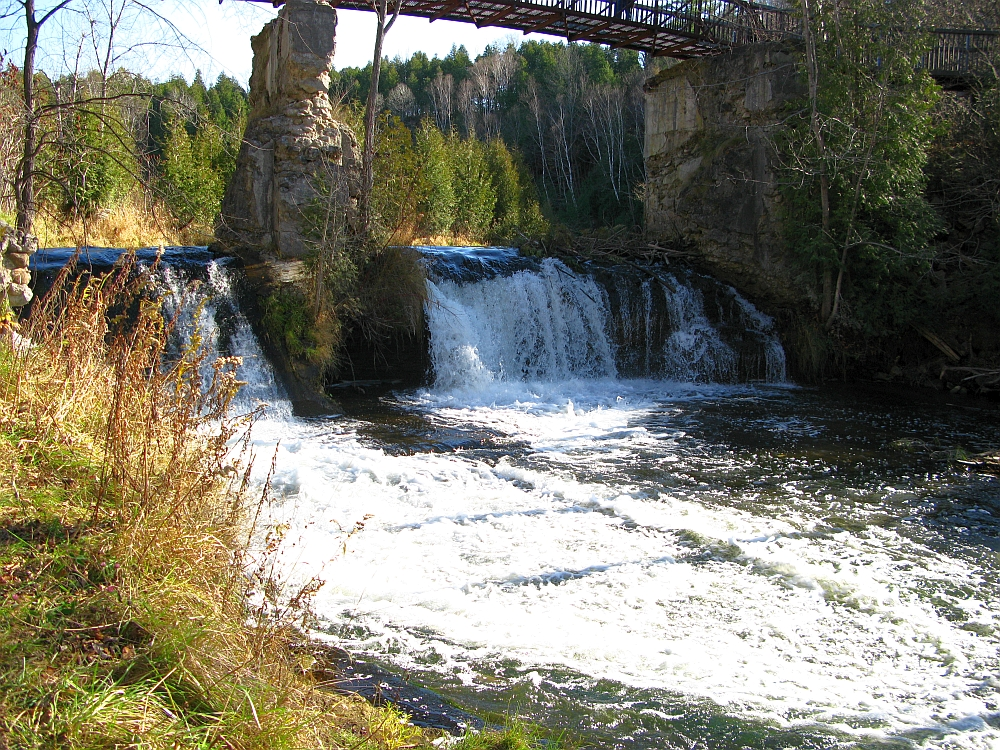
- Credit River flowing through Forks of the Credit Provincial Park

- Location within Southern Ontario
- Interactive map of Forks of the Credit Provincial Park
- Location: Ontario, Canada
- Nearest city: Caledon, Ontario
- Coordinates: 43.816°N 80.012°W
- Area: 282 hectares (700 acres)
- Established: 1985
- Visitors: 51,559 (in 2022)
- Governing body: Ontario Parks
- Website: ontarioparks.ca/park/forksofthecredit

Forks of the Credit Provincial Park, located in Caledon, Ontario, Canada, is part of the Ontario Parks system and is part of the Niagara Escarpment biosphere. The park is on the Bruce Trail. The Credit River runs through the park. Other notable features of the park include a kettle lake and talus slope.

== History ==
In 1968 the Niagara Escarpment Study recommended that a park be established in the Forks of the Credit area; this recommendation was then accepted by the Government of Ontario. It was officially regulated as a provincial park in 1985.

== Historic mill and dam ==
There has been a mill in the area since 1820. In 1885, John Deagle bought the mill at the top of the falls and converted it into an electrical generating station, damming the river and creating Cataract Lake; he named the enterprise The Cataract Electric Co. Ltd. Later the station was purchased by Ontario Hydro and was eventually shut down in 1947. The dam was later destroyed and the lake drained. The ruins of the mill and powerhouse are located within the park; The ruins of the Deagle mill are the most visible reminders of the history.

== Bailey Bridge ==
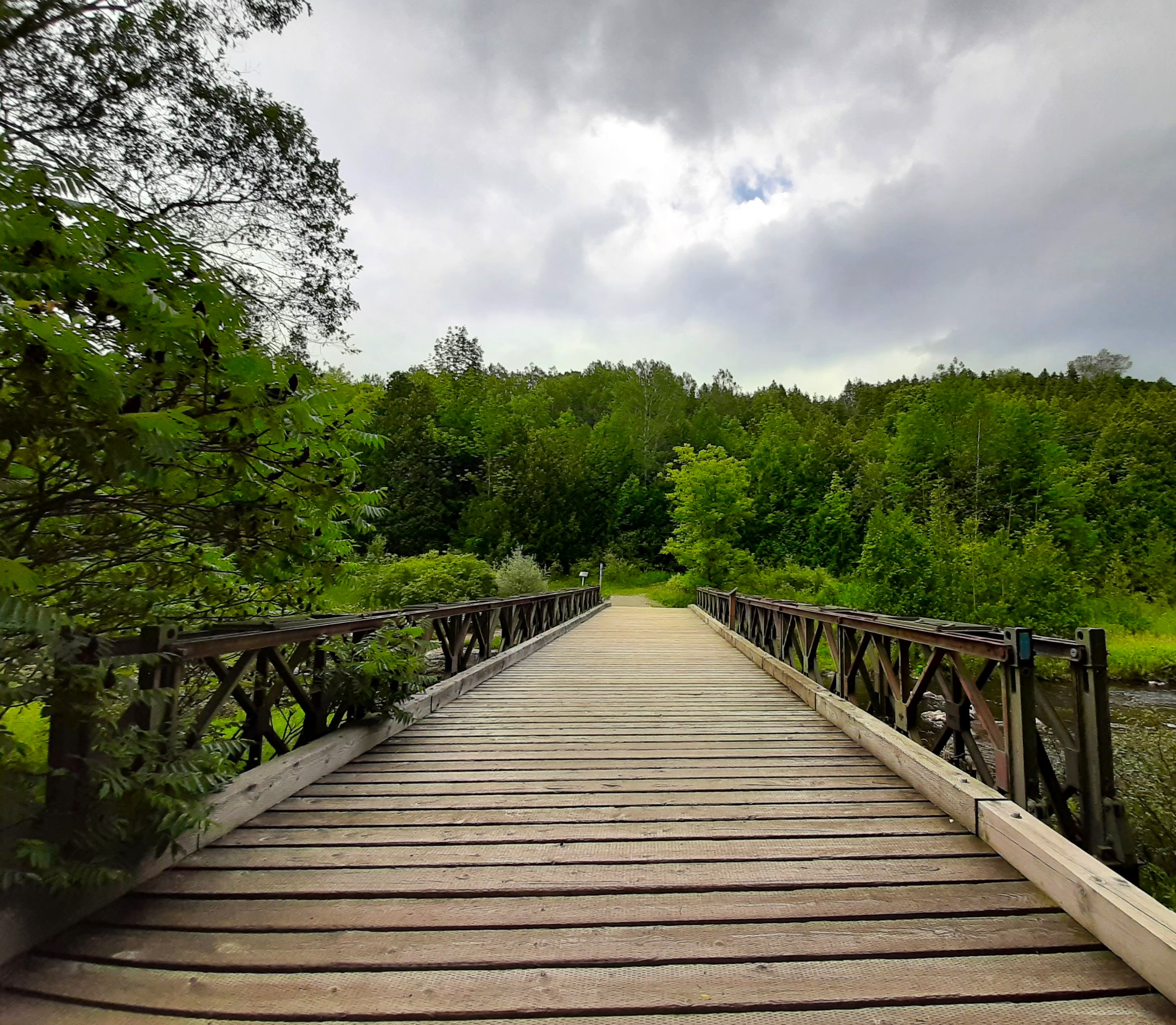
Bailey Bridge

In 1999 the Canadian Army's 2 Field Engineering Regiment (now 32 Combat Engineer Regiment) built a pedestrian Bailey Bridge along Meadow Trail and refurbished with new decking in 2016.

== Railway station ==
The Credit Valley Railway reached the area in 1879 and built a station at the Forks of the Credit as well as a timber trestle spanning the Credit River. The primary purpose was shipping Credit Valley sandstone to other communities in Ontario, particularly Toronto and Hamilton, where the product was used in the construction of large buildings such as Queen's Park and the original Toronto City Hall. No remnants of the station remain.
