= Credit River =

River in Canada

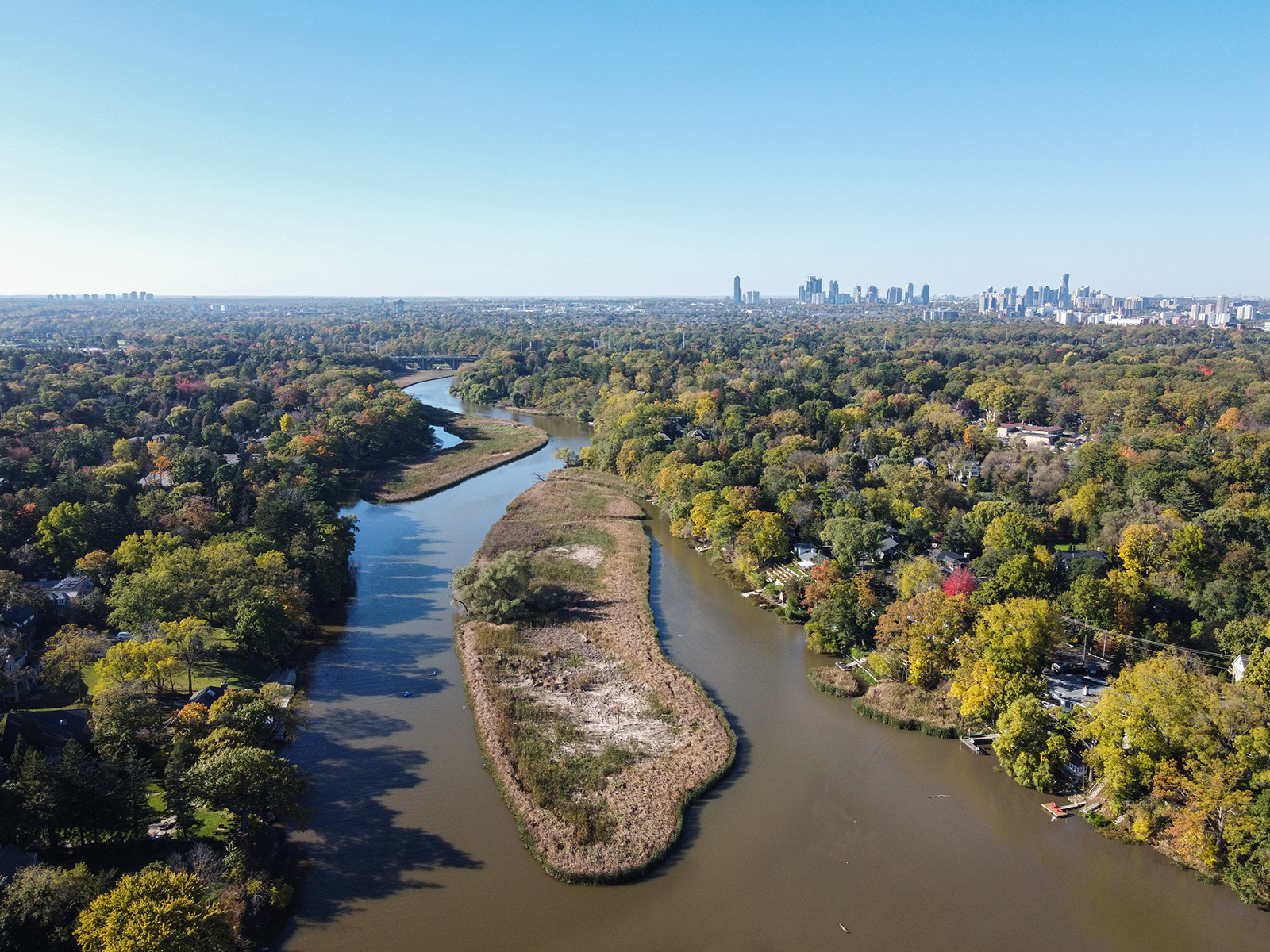
- The Credit River in Port Credit
- Etymology: From Rivière au Crédit, used by French fur traders
- Native name: Missinnihe

Location
- Country: Canada
- Province: Ontario

Physical characteristics
- Source: Niagara Escarpment
  - location: near Orangeville, Ontario and Caledon East, Ontario
  - elevation: 400 m (1,300 ft)
- Mouth: Lake Ontario
  - location: Port Credit
  - elevation: 74 m (243 ft)
- Length: 90 km (56 mi)
- Basin size: 1,000 km^{2} (390 sq mi)
- Discharge
  - location: Erindale, Mississauga
  - average: 8.12 m^{3}/s (287 cu ft/s)
  - minimum: 0.085 m^{3}/s (3.0 cu ft/s)
  - maximum: 501 m^{3}/s (17,700 cu ft/s)

The Credit River is a river in southern Ontario, which flows from headwaters above the Niagara Escarpment near Orangeville and Caledon East to empty into Lake Ontario at Port Credit, Mississauga. It drains an area of approximately 1,000 square kilometres (390 mi^{2}). The total length of the river and its tributary streams is over 1,500 kilometres (930 mi).

Despite urbanization and associated problems with water quality on the lower section of this river, it provides spawning areas for Chinook salmon, rainbow trout/steelhead, and lake-run brown trout. There is a fish ladder on the river at Streetsville. Much of the river can still be travelled by canoe or kayak. The headwaters of the Credit River are home to a native self-sustaining brook trout population and an introduced brown trout population.

Credit Valley Conservation, the local watershed management conservation authority, operates several Conservation Areas including Belfountain, Island Lake, and Terra Cotta.

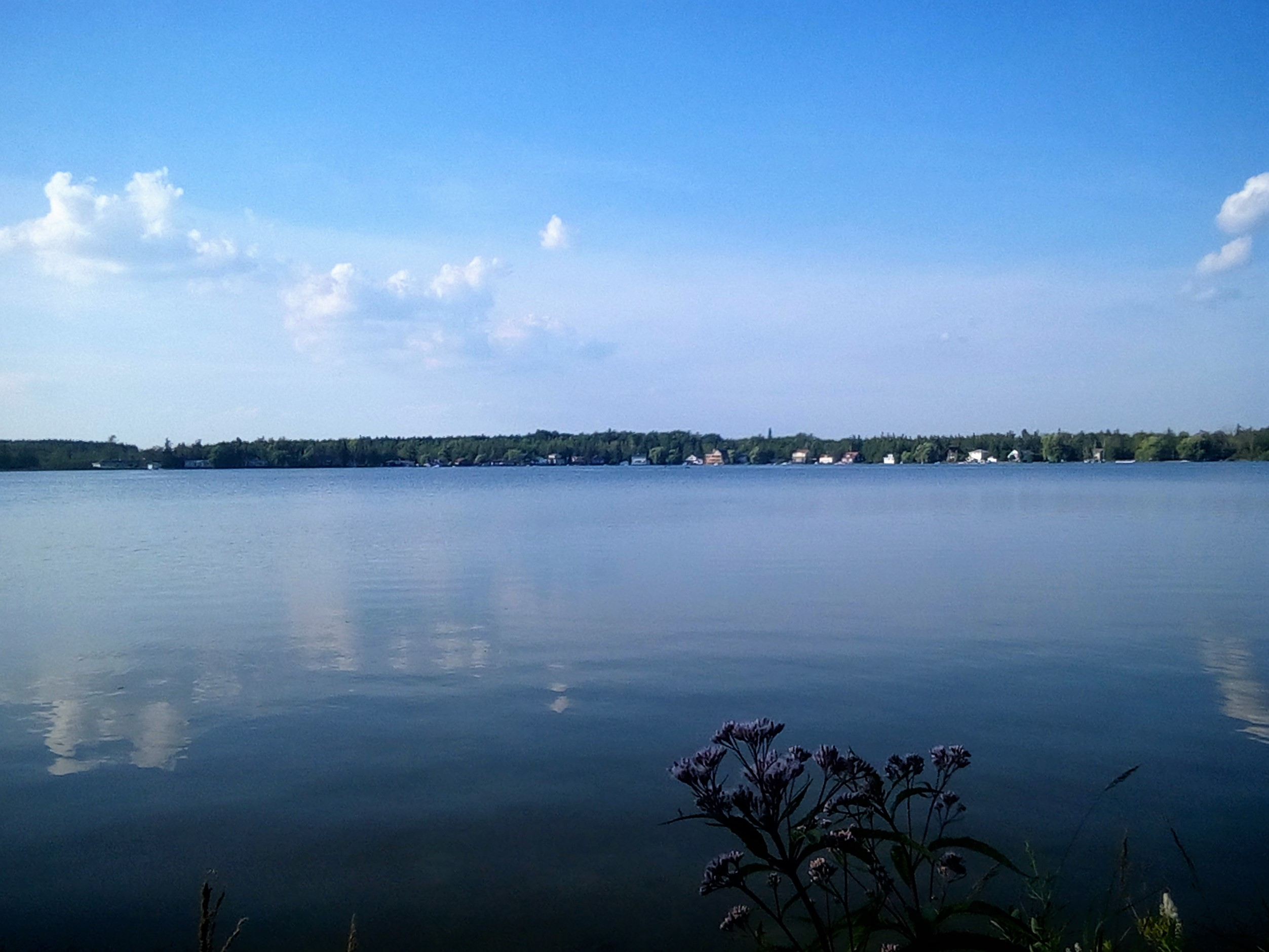
Caledon Lake is a headwater of Credit River

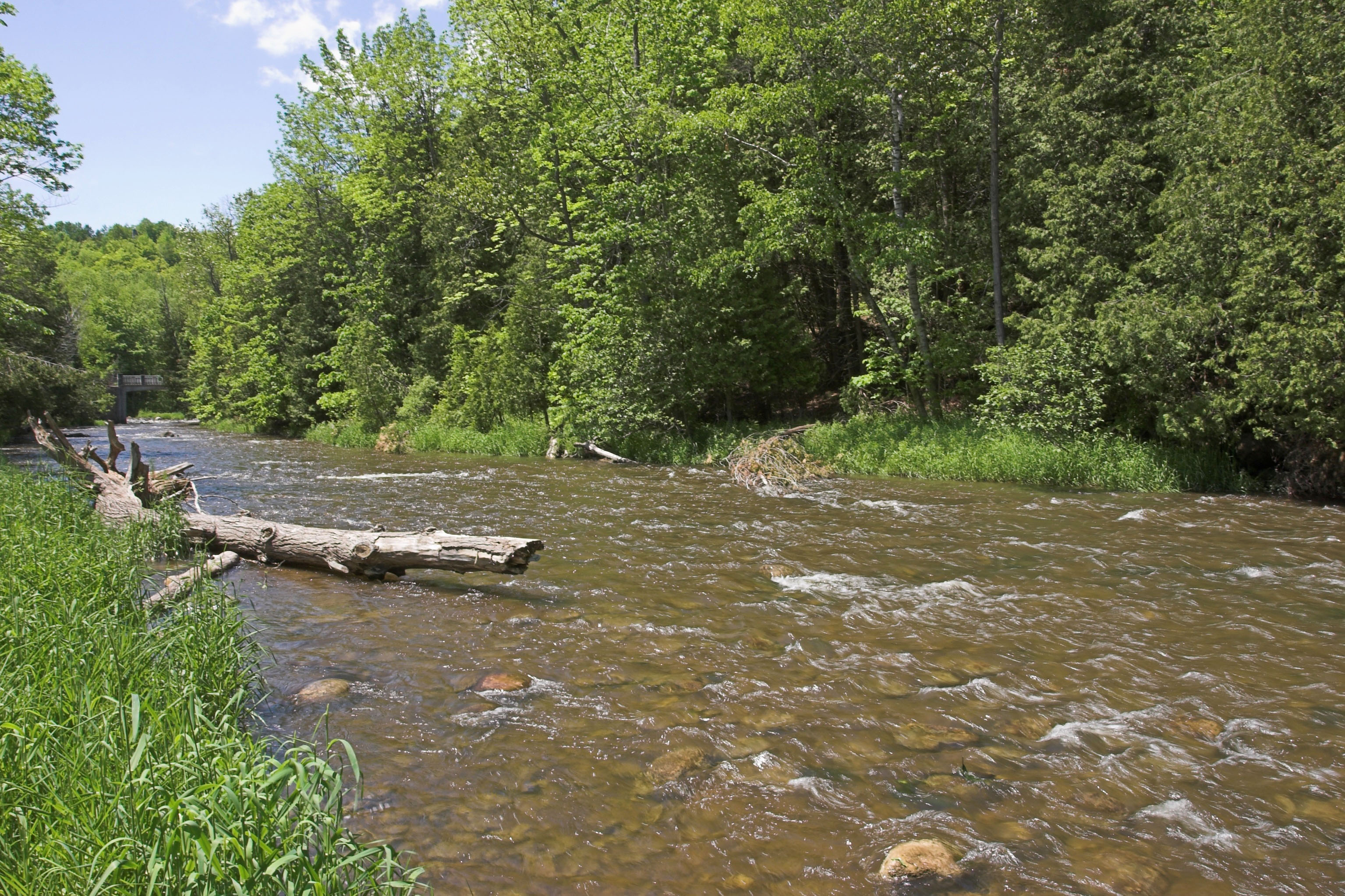
Credit River near Belfountain

Forks of the Credit Provincial Park is located on the upper part of the river between Brampton and Orangeville, and is near the Bruce Trail.

Communities in the river's watershed include the following:

- City of Brampton
- City of Mississauga
- Township of Amaranth
- Town of Caledon
- Township of East Garafraxa
- Town of Halton Hills
- Town of Mono
- Town of Orangeville

== Naming ==
The river became known as Missinnihe (Eastern Ojibwa: "trusting creek") to the Mississaugas who met annually with European traders there. To the First Nations, the river was "held in reverential estimation as the favourite resort of their ancestors" and the band, which ranged from Long Point on Lake Erie to the Rouge River on Lake Ontario, became known as the Credit River Indians. Their descendants are today the Mississaugas of the Credit First Nation.

The origins of the English name come from the time when French fur traders supplied goods to the native people in advance (on credit) against furs which would be delivered the following spring. It was known as the Rivière au Crédit. The trading post was set up at the mouth of the river, in Port Credit, in the early 18th century.

== Watershed population and land use ==
As of the 2006 census, 750,000 people live in the Credit River watershed. Of those, 87 percent live in the lower third of the watershed. Population growth is approximately 3 percent per year. In 1999, 21 percent of the watershed was developed. By 2020, it is projected that 40 percent of the watershed will be developed (based on approved development and the official plans of the municipalities).

=== Plants and animals ===
The Credit River is home to a wide range of wildlife. Some species are permanent or seasonal residents while others are sighted occasionally. The watershed is home to 1,330 plant species, 64 fish species (including many bait fish, pike, and brook trout), 41 mammal species, 5 turtle species, 8 snake species, 17 amphibian species, and 244 bird species.

==== Turtle species (5) ====
- Common snapping turtle, Chelydra serpentina
- Midland painted turtle, Chrysemys picta marginata
- Red-eared slider, Trachemys scripta elegans
- Blanding's turtle, Emydoidea blandingii
- Common map turtle, Graptemys geographica

==== Snake species (8) ====
- Eastern garter snake, Thamnophis sirtalis sirtalis
- Northern redbelly snake, Storeria occipitomaculata
- Northern brown snake, Storeria dekayi
- Northern ringneck snake, Diadophis punctatus edwardsii
- Eastern milk snake, Lampropeltis triangulum triangulum
- Northern water snake, Nerodia sipedon
- Smooth green snake, Opheodrys vernalis
- Northern ribbon snake, Thamnophis saurita septentrionalis

==== Amphibian species (17) ====
- Common mudpuppy, Necturus maculosus maculosus
- Red-spotted newt (eastern), Notophthalmus viridescens
- Jefferson salamander, Ambystoma jeffersonianum
  - "Silvery salamander"
  - "Tremblay's salamander"
- Blue-spotted salamander, Ambystoma laterale
- Northern redback salamander, Plethodon cinereus
- Four-toed salamander, Hemidactylium scutatum
- Spotted salamander, Ambystoma maculatum
- Eastern American toad, Anaxyrus americanus americanus
- Northern spring peeper, Pseudacris crucifer crucifer
- Tetraploid grey treefrog, Hyla versicolor
- Striped chorus frog (western), Pseudacris triseriata triseriata
- Wood frog, Lithobates sylvaticus
- Northern leopard frog, Lithobates pipiens
- Pickerel frog, Lithobates palustris
- Green frog, Lithobates clamitans
- Mink frog, Lithobates septentrionalis
- Bullfrog, Lithobates catesbeianus

== Bridges ==
List of major roadways crossing over Credit River in the Peel region:

- Lakeshore Road — 4 lane steel box girder bridge
- Queen Elizabeth Way — two span open spandrel deck arch bridges built in 1934 and widened 1960; may be demolished and replaced pending review
- Dundas Street West – two separate span steel box girder bridges
- Burnhamthorpe Road West – two separate span concrete bridges
- Ontario Highway 403 — 8 lane concrete girder overpass(es)
- Eglinton Avenue West – two separate span concrete bridges and a lower small steel truss bridge for a pedestrian trail visible from the north side
- Bristol Road West – two lane concrete girder bridge
- Britannia Road — 4 lane concrete overpass
- Credit view Road – concrete overpass being widened with new span to accommodate 4 lanes
- Ontario Highway 401 — 6 lane concrete girder overpasses
- Old Derry Road West – two lane steel Warren truss bridge (c. 1930 and rehabilitated in 2005)
- Derry Road — 6 lane concrete overpass
- Ontario Highway 407 — two separate span 8 lane concrete girder overpasses
- Steeles Avenue West – 4 lane concrete girder overpass
- Credit view Road – single lane concrete bowstring bridge c. 1928
- Mississauga Road — 4 lane concrete girder overpass near Queen Street in Brampton
- Heritage Road – 2 lane concrete overpass
- Ontario Highway 7 / Guelph Street – 2 lane overpass

Most of these bridges were built in the mid-20th century or later. Only the Queen Elizabeth Way and Old Derry Road West bridges are older.

CP Rail and CN Rail have steel deck truss bridges crossing over the Credit River.

== See also ==
- List of Ontario rivers
- Wilbur Lake

== Sources ==
- Smith, Donald B. (1987). Sacred Feathers.
