= Ontario Highway 413 =

Future controlled-access highway and bus transitway in Ontario

Highway 413
- GTA West Corridor Highway 410 and 427 extensions (proposed)

Route information
- Maintained by Ministry of Transportation of Ontario
- Length: 52 km (32 mi)
- History: Proposed January 2002; Cancelled February 9, 2018; Revived November 2018

Major junctions
- West end: Highway 401 / 407 ETR in Halton Hills
- Highway 410 south in Caledon; Highway 427 south near Bolton
- East end: Highway 400 in Vaughan

Location
- Country: Canada
- Province: Ontario

Highway system
- Ontario provincial highways; Current; Former; 400-series
← Highway 412	→ Highway 416

King's Highway 413, commonly referred to as Highway 413 and known as the GTA West Corridor or GTA West until 2021, is a 400-series highway and bus transitway currently under construction in the western Greater Toronto Area of the Canadian province of Ontario. The approximately 52-kilometre (32 mi) route was undergoing planning and analysis under an environmental impact assessment (EA) by the Ministry of Transportation of Ontario (MTO) and the Government of Ontario. The new four-to-six lane controlled-access highway will travel between the existing interchange of Highway 401 and the 407 ETR at the Halton–Peel boundary, and Highway 400 north of Vaughan. In addition, northerly extensions of Highways 410 and 427 will be built to connect with Highway 413.

The highway will serve as an outer ring road around the built-up areas of Brampton and Vaughan that would permit traffic travelling between Southwestern Ontario and Ontario's cottage country or Northern Ontario to bypass much of the Greater Toronto Area. However, the highway has attracted criticism for its environmental impacts, including concerns about its footprint on designated farmland in the Greenbelt, and its implications to encourage urban sprawl and induced demand.

Planning for the corridor began in the mid 2000s. However the EA was suspended in 2015, and the project shelved in February 2018 by the Liberal government of Kathleen Wynne. Following the 2018 Ontario general election in June of that year, the new Progressive Conservative government of Doug Ford announced the resumption of the suspended EA in November. Since then, several of the municipalities along the route have voiced their opposition to its construction. In April 2024, a previously announced federal EA was dropped by the Canadian government, with the federal and provincial governments to work together to minimize environmental impacts along the corridor instead. On August 27, 2025, Ford confirmed the provincial government has started construction on the highway.

== Route description ==
The proposed route of Highway 413 was confirmed in the Technically Preferred Route report, which was published by Aecon and released on August 7, 2020. The approximately 52-kilometre-long (32 mi) route will consist of a four-to-six lane freeway as well as a transitway situated within a 170-metre-wide (560 ft) right-of-way. Fifteen interchanges were proposed. Four of the interchanges, including both terminuses, will be freeway-to-freeway. The corridor will arch around the west and north sides of the rural–urban fringe of Brampton, skirting the boundary between the regions of Halton and Peel before proceeding northwest into York Region.

The southwestern end will be at a freeway-to-freeway connection at the existing interchange between Highway 401 and Highway 407ETR at the tripoint of Halton Hills, Milton and Mississauga. It will meander northward, entering Brampton at an interchange with Winston Churchill Boulevard (Peel Regional Road 19). Crossing the Credit River immediately east of Georgetown, it will gradually curve northwest to parallel Old School Road east of Heritage Road. It will interchange with Bovaird Drive (Regional Road 107), which becomes Highway 7 to the west beyond the Brampton–Halton Hills boundary. Midway between Bovaird Drive and the next interchange at Mayfield Road (Peel Regional Road 14), the freeway will cross the CN Halton Subdivision, which carries the Kitchener line of GO Transit.

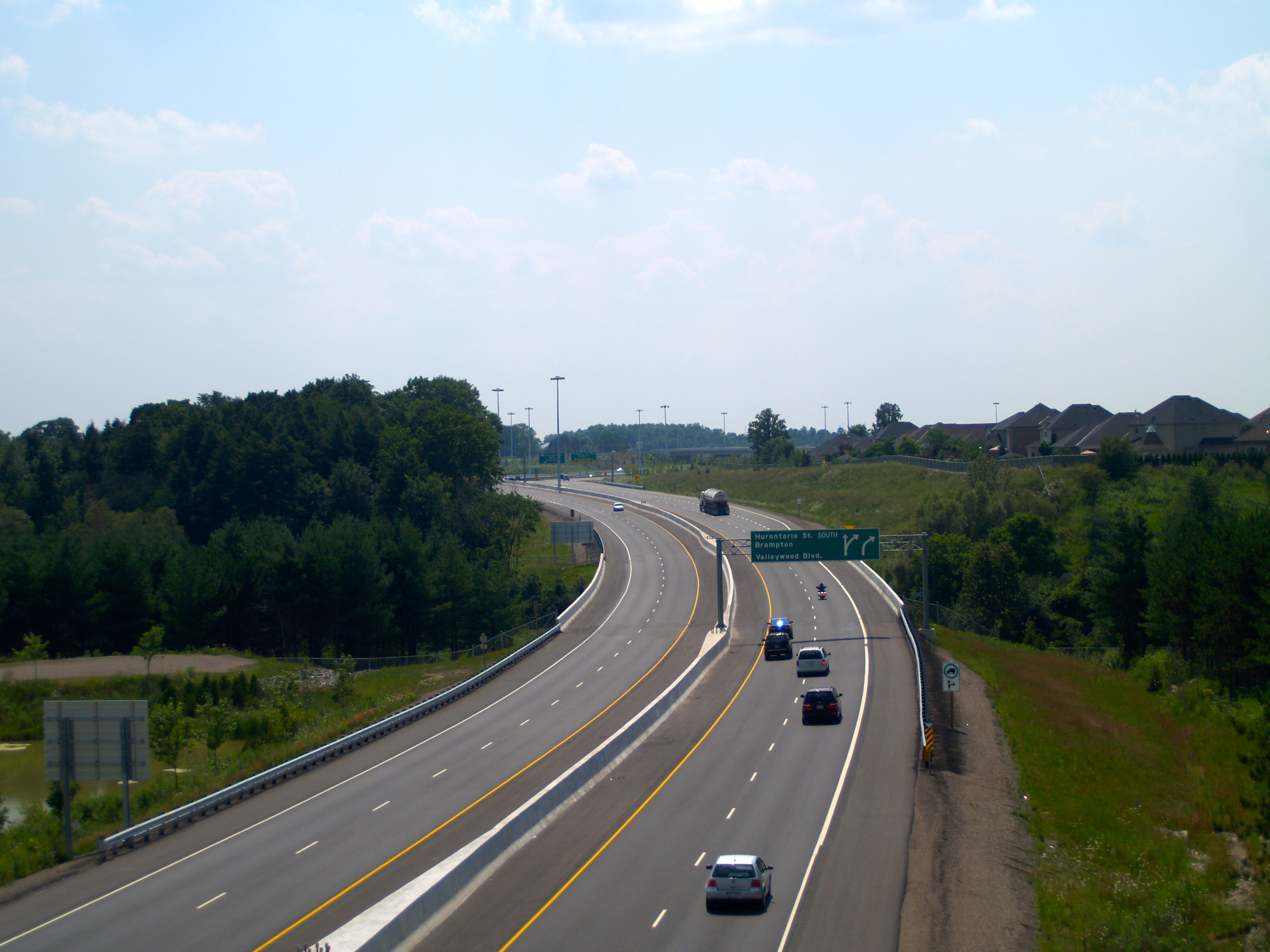
Part of the Highway 410 extension, opened in 2009, will be bypassed by the construction of Highway 413.

Beyond Mayfield Road, Highway 413 will make a broad curve to the northeast into Caledon, passing Mississauga Road (Peel Regional Road 1). Travelling roughly parallel to and midway between Mayfield Road and King Street (Peel Regional Road 9), it will interchange with Chinguacousy Road and pass north of Snelgrove and Mayfield West near an interchange with Highway 10. Just east of Mayfield West, a new extension of Highway 410, will meet Highway 413 at a freeway-to-freeway interchange. The new extension will also bypass the 4-kilometre (2.5 mi) extension north of Mayfield Road that opened in 2009. To the east will be a partial interchange with Bramalea Road. After interchanging with Airport Road (Peel Regional Road 7), the route will curve southeast, with an interchange at The Gore Road (Peel Regional Road 8), before re-entering Brampton to pass between the large unincorporated community of Bolton in Caledon and the Brampton neighbourhood of Castlemore. An interchange at Humber Station Road will provide an eastern access to Mayfield Road, which Highway 413 will cross.

Highway 413 will cross the Peel–York regional boundary at Regional Road 50 (former Highway 50) immediately north of Nashville Road (York Regional Road 49), where it will encounter a freeway-to-freeway interchange with an extension of Highway 427 northward from Major Mackenzie Drive (York Regional Road 25). Curving northeast, the route will encounter the CP MacTier Subdivision before crossing over the Humber River at the location of the Humber Valley Heritage Trail. Between the main branch and east branch of the Humber River will be an interchange with York Regional Road 27 (former Highway 27) north of Kleinburg. The final several kilometres will travel east, midway between Kirby Road and King Vaughan Road. After a partial interchange with Weston Road (York Regional Road 56), it ends at a freeway-to-freeway interchange with Highway 400.

== History ==
=== 2002 to 2018 ===
The GTA West Corridor was first conceived as the GTA East–West Economic Corridor by the Ministry of Transportation of Ontario (MTO) in its Central Ontario Strategic Transportation Directions study in January 2002. The North–South Corridor Feasibility Study, prepared for the MTO and City of Brampton in September 2003, was first to recommend acquiring land for a future "higher order transportation facility" around Brampton. The report identified the need for a controlled-access highway as part of the city's ultimate transportation plan to serve western Brampton. Land was subsequently set aside for the next several years while the MTO analysed the need for both corridors.

In 2005, the Government of Ontario passed the Places to Grow Act, which set forth consistent urban planning principles across the province for the following 25 years. The Growth Plan for the Greater Golden Horseshoe was released in June of the following year as a framework for implementing the act, with a future transportation corridor identified north of Highway 401 between Guelph and Vaughan. Following the submission of a Terms of Reference on June 15, 2007, an EA began (Note: "Subsection 13(1) of the Environmental Assessment Act allows a person to apply to the Minister of the Environment to approve a class environmental assessment with respect to a class of undertakings. The application consists of a proposed terms of reference and subsequently a class environmental assessment.") on March 4, 2008, to establish conceptual routes for additional transportation infrastructure to interconnect the GTA West economic centres (Milton, Brampton and Vaughan) with Guelph and Waterloo Region. The early concepts for the GTA West Corridor considered five different options, including two extending as far west as Guelph without intersecting Highway 401 or Highway 407. When combined with the planned Highway 7N west of Guelph, they would have resulted in a parallel freeway to the north of Highway 401 between Kitchener/Waterloo and Vaughan. (Note: Both options 4-4 and 4-5 would have connected the Hanlon Expressway with Highway 400. Highway 7N will connect Kitchener/Waterloo with the north end of the Hanlon Expressway.)

Simultaneously, the City of Brampton appealed an amendment of the Halton Region Official Plan to the Ontario Municipal Board. As a result, the North–South Corridor Feasibility Study evolved into the Halton–Peel Boundary Area Transportation Study (HPBATS), which commenced on April 11, 2007. HPBATS recommended a north–south route, known as the Halton–Peel Freeway, east of Georgetown and west of Brampton as a complementary project that would connect in the north with the potential GTA West Corridor. The completed study and its recommendations were submitted to the MTO in late April 2010. In 2012 the provincial EA recommended that the GTA West should follow a broadly similar corridor to the Halton–Peel Freeway.

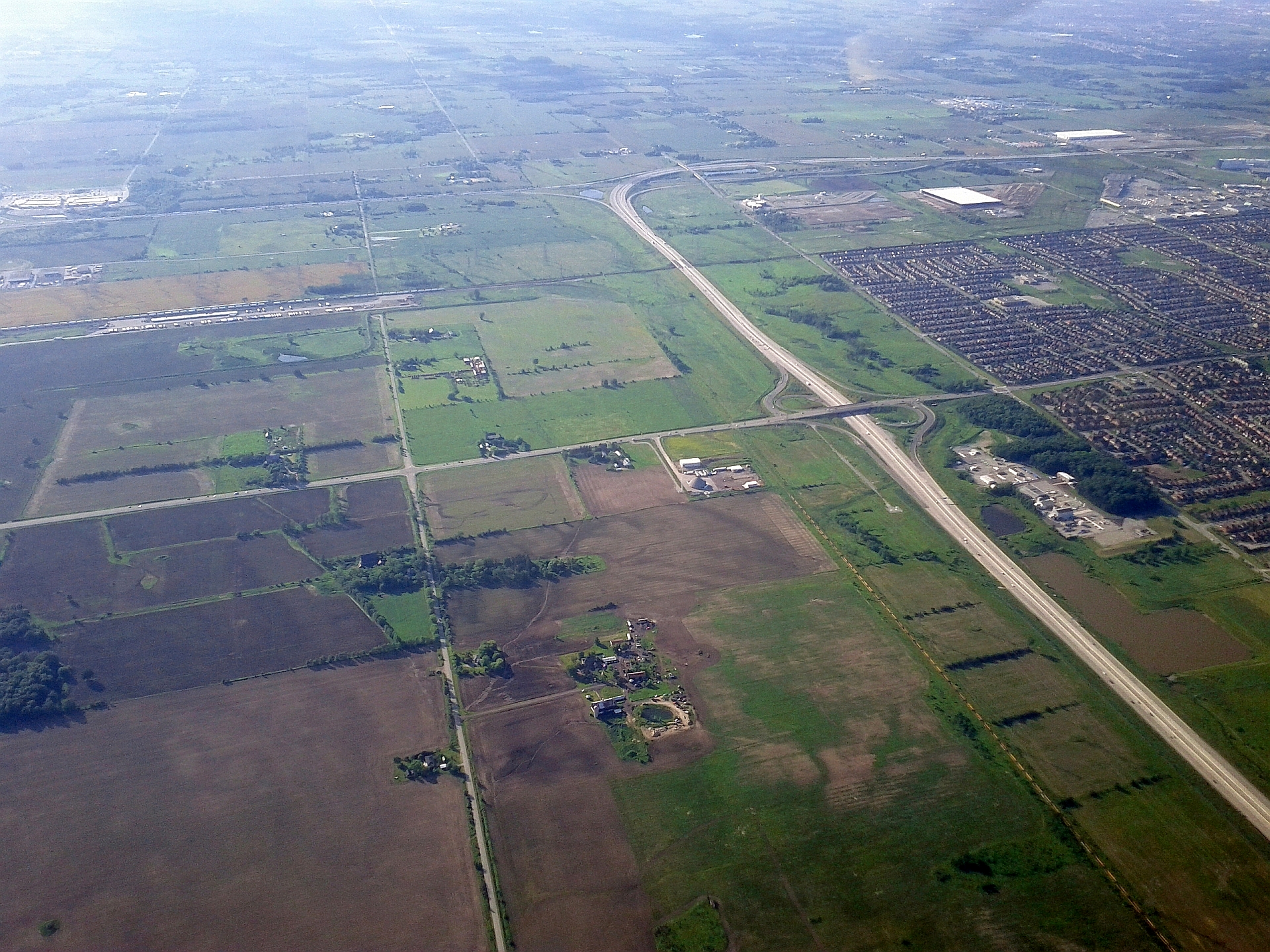
Stage 1 of the GTA West EA concluded with the recommendation that the Highway 401 and Highway 407 ETR interchange (located at the curve at top of photo) serve as the western terminus of the proposed freeway.

Stage 1 of the EA concluded with the release of the GTA West Transportation Development Strategy Report in November 2012. The report indicated limited demand for and the considerable environmental consequences of a new crossing of the Niagara Escarpment. It recommended not proceeding further with a new route over the escarpment, instead favouring a connection to Highway 401 west of Mississauga, including the route of the proposed Halton–Peel Freeway. An alternative route, connecting with Highway 401 west of Milton and travelling between 5 Side Road and 10 Side Road through Halton Hills, was also not carried forward, with the MTO instead electing to widen Highway 401 to 12 lanes between Milton and Mississauga.

Stage 2 of the GTA West EA began in February 2014, intended to further refine the study corridor to a preliminary design. However, by this point public opposition to the corridor began to appear, with the group Environmental Defence starting a campaign against the proposed highway by 2015. On December 16, 2015, Minister of Transportation Steven Del Duca announced the suspension of the EA process. A three-member advisory panel (Note: The three-member GTA West Advisory Panel consisted of former Deputy Minister of the Environment Gail Beggs, environmental lawyer Rodney Northey, and Ryerson urban planning professor Dr. Matthias Sweet.) was formed in October 2016 to assess alternative approaches to meet projected traffic levels. The suspension was opposed by the municipalities of Vaughan, King, York Region, Caledon and Peel Region, as well as Brampton. The advisory panel report was released on May 29, 2017, recommending that the EA be stopped, and the "development of a single transportation plan for the Greater Golden Horseshoe" proceed in its place. The panel also recommended that the provincial government negotiate with the private operators of the 407 ETR to encourage the routing of more truck traffic onto that route, alleviating congestion on the 401, and negating the need for the GTA West. Consequently the Ontario government cancelled the GTA West Study on February 9, 2018. In the run up to the 2018 provincial election, the Progressive Conservatives stated that they would complete the EA of the project if elected.

=== 2018 to present ===
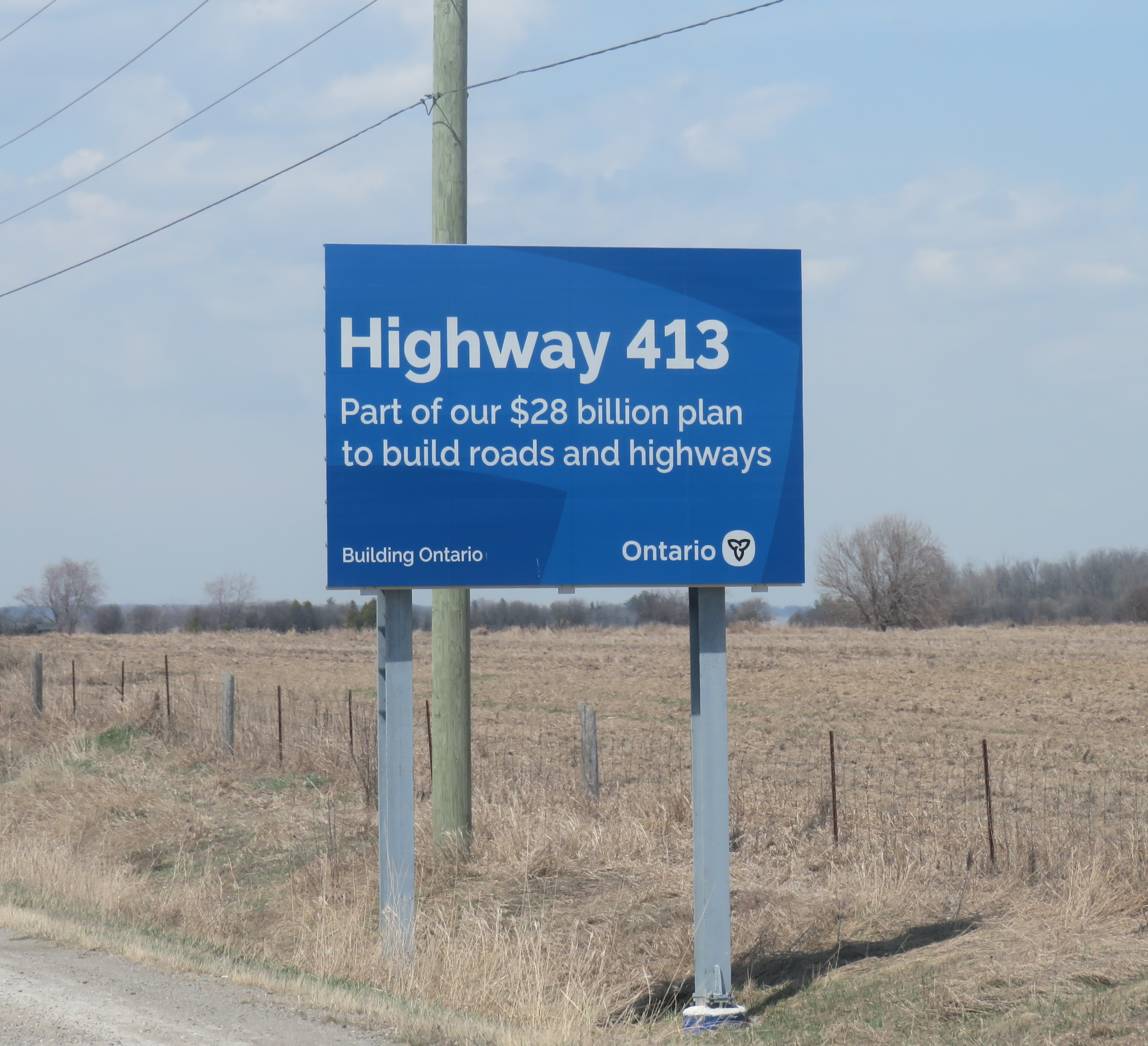
Sign advertising the future freeway on Highway 10.

The 2018 Ontario general election, held on June 7, 2018, ended the 15-year tenure of the Ontario Liberal Party and saw Premier Kathleen Wynne defeated by the Progressive Conservatives (PCs) under Doug Ford. As part of the PCs Fall Economic Statement, released in November 2018, the government committed to the campaign pledge of resuming the suspended EA for the GTA West Corridor, "in order to speed up travel and alleviate traffic congestion". The EA was subsequently resumed on June 5, 2019. In September and October of that year, a series of Public Information Centres were held in which the preferred route and interchange locations were announced. This route, with modifications, (Note: As a result of an approved subdivision proposal north of the GTA West Corridor, the Coleraine Drive interchange was moved to Humber Station Road.) was confirmed publicly by the provincial government on August 7, 2020. The EA for the corridor was expected to be complete by the end of 2022.

On February 3, 2021, Jonathan Wilkinson, the federal Minister of Environment and Climate Change announced that he had received a request for the project to undergo an EA at the federal level, following a formal request from Environmental Defence. On May 3, 2021, Wilkinson announced that a federal EA would take place. In response, provincial Minister of Transportation Caroline Mulroney stated that she would work with the federal government to address “newly found concerns" on potential adverse effects on species at risk.

Funding was committed to the project as part of the fall economic statement on November 1, 2021. That month, the GTA West began to be referred to by the Government of Ontario as Highway 413 for the first time. The highway was a contentious issue during the 2022 Ontario general election, with the Liberal, NDP and Green Party pledging to cancel the project if elected. The three NDP MPPs in Brampton were defeated by their PC counterparts in the election.

In early 2023, 467 landowners along the planned route received letters requesting permission to enter their property for "intrusive and non-intrusive fieldwork" to assess the suitability of their property for the project. The inspections were conducted between March 2023 and the end of 2024.

In October 2023, the Supreme Court of Canada ruled that the Impact Assessment Act was largely unconstitutional. Following this, Attorney General of Ontario Doug Downey announced that the province would seek legal action to prevent the federal government intervening in Highway 413. In March 2024, the Canadian government moved to drop the federal EA, with Downey stating "we have come to an agreement". In April 2024, the provincial and federal governments announced that the EA had been dropped, and that they would work together to "minimize environmental impacts in areas of federal environmental jurisdiction" and ensure that impacts to species at risk are considered. Following the announcement, provincial Minister of Transportation Prabmeet Sarkaria stated "we finally have certainty to move forward with the ... project". The announcement was criticised by other political parties and environmental groups. Later that month, Premier Ford announced that construction will begin in 2025.

In October 2024, the government of Ontario tabled Bill 212, exempting the Highway 413 project from the Environmental Assessment Act, as well as speeding up property acquisitions.

On August 27, 2025, Ontario premier Doug Ford and his provincial government confirmed they are starting construction on Highway 413.

In September 2026, the Government of Ontario issued a notice of procurement to design and build a segment of the highway between The Gore Road in Caledon and Highway 400 in Vaughan, with a request for proposal to be issued later in the year. It will also include the northward extension of Highway 427 from Major Mackenzie Drive and an interchange between the two highways.

== Impacts and environmental concerns ==
The highway has attracted criticism from municipalities, politicians, campaign groups and the public regarding its potential impacts.

Environmental groups have criticised the significant impact that the highway would have on the environment. In addition to increasing air pollution and greenhouse gas emissions, opponents claim the highway would disrupt woodlands, waterways, wetlands, wildlife habitats and species at risk. The highway will travel through both the Greenbelt, the Whitebelt (an area of land left unprotected from development when the Greenbelt was established in 2005) and the Humber and Credit watersheds. According to the Toronto and Region Conservation Authority, the highway would specifically impact 85 waterways, 220 wetlands, 10 different species at risk and hundreds of acres of vulnerable wildlife habitat. According to a study commissioned by Environmental Defence, 29 species at risk were found along the proposed highway.

Urban planning critics claim the highway will encourage urban sprawl through induced demand, as research shows that building new highways tends to attract more drivers and fails to improve congestion levels on other roads. Consequently, they claim it would increase car dependency in surrounding areas and ultimately only save commuters around 30 to 60 seconds of travel time. Other groups, such as the National Farmers Union have concerns about the impacts of the highway on agricultural land, as the highway would be built on around 2,000 acres of Class 1 and 2 farmland – the most productive designation. A planning land use expert noted that "agricultural land is valued as low as C$18,000 an acre, but residential land is easily worth C$1 million an acre" and that billions of dollars could be made if farmland adjacent to the highway was rezoned as land for development. Avison Young, a real estate services firm, estimated around 62,000 acres (250 km^{2}) of developable land is available located within two kilometres (1 1/4 mi) of the 16 proposed interchanges. In 2021, a Toronto Star investigation noted that 3,300 acres (13 km^{2}) of land along the route was owned by eight major property developers, several of which had donated to Doug Ford's Progressive Conservative government.

Other critics have noted the high cost of building the highway – the cost of construction in 2012 was estimated at C$4.7 billion, with 2021 estimates around C$6 billion. It is unclear whether the highway would be tolled, similar to Highway 407. As an alternative to a new freeway, stakeholders have suggested investing in local transportation improvements. Some proposed suggestions include improvements to local roads, truck priority lanes on Highway 407, public transit investments including GO Transit Regional Express Rail and widening of existing highways. Others have suggested working with the owners of Highway 407 to increase capacity on that highway, or subsidize truck drivers to use Highway 407. A study commissioned by the previous provincial government stated that the highway would save all drivers in Greater Golden Horseshoe approximately 30 seconds of travel time, regardless of whether their trip used the highway or not. The Ministry of Transportation contends that the Highway 413 will save drivers up to 30 minutes if their trip uses the full length of the highway.

== Perspectives ==
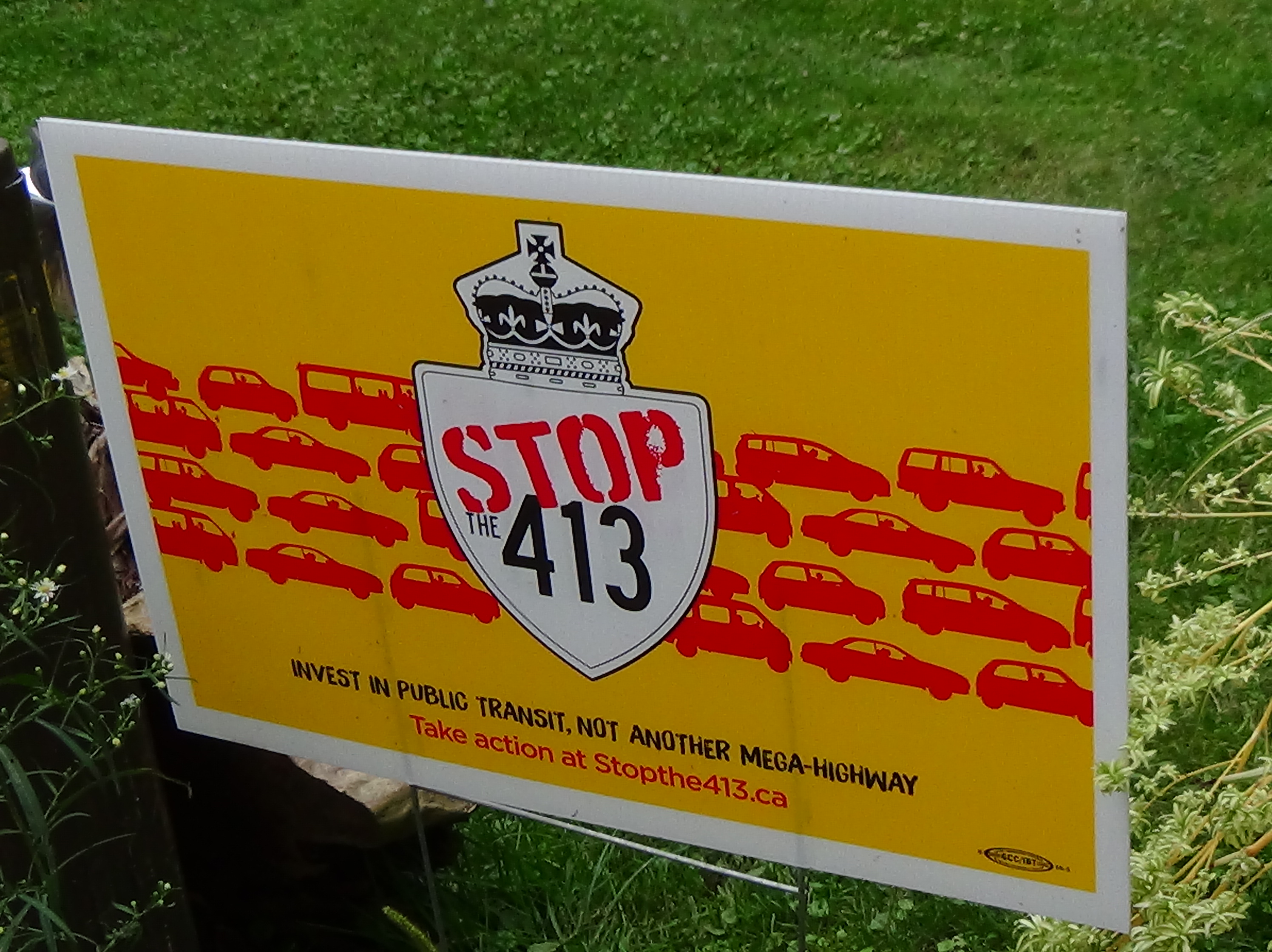
Lawn sign opposing the highway's construction

The majority of local municipalities have opposed the project, including Mississauga, Vaughan, Halton Hills, Halton Region, Peel Region, King Township and Orangeville. Brampton and Caledon withdrew their support of the fast-tracked environmental assessment. The NDP opposition in the Legislative Assembly of Ontario, the Green Party of Ontario and Ontario Liberal Party have stated that they would scrap the highway following the 2022 provincial election. Despite the corridor not directly impacting the City of Toronto itself, Toronto City Council passed a resolution in March 2021 condemning the proposed highway. In August 2023, over 50,000 people signed a petition requesting that the federal government block the highway.

Supporters of the freeway include Regional Municipality of York as well as the Progressive Conservative government. Several non-governmental organizations such as the Ontario Trucking Association, the Building Industry and Land Development Association (BILD), and the Association of Municipalities of Ontario also continue to support the project. The Toronto Metropolitan University Centre for Urban Research and Land Development (CUR) also specifically supported the streamlining of the EA process, noting that “It is simply taking too long to bring critical infrastructure improvements such as roads, transit, sewers and water to completion".

== Exit list ==
The following table lists the proposed exits along Highway 413, as shown in the Preferred Route.

Division	Location	km	mi	Destinations	Notes
Halton	Milton – Halton Hills – Mississauga boundary	0	0.0	Highway 401 / 407 ETR	
Halton – Peel boundary	Halton Hills – Brampton boundary	4	2.5	Regional Road 19 (Winston Churchill Boulevard)	
Peel	Brampton	7	4.3	Bridge over the Credit River	
Peel	Brampton	9	5.6	Regional Road 107 (Bovaird Drive)	Formerly Highway 7 (Note: The Bovaird Drive portion of Highway 7 was transferred to the Regional Municipality of Peel on November 28, 2001.)
Peel	Brampton – Caledon boundary	13	8.1	Regional Road 14 (Mayfield Road)	
Peel	Caledon	19	12	Chinguacousy Road	
Peel	Caledon	22	14	Highway 10 (Hurontario Street) – Orangeville	
Peel	Caledon	26	16	Highway 410 south	Diversion of Highway 410 on east side of Snelgrove
Peel	Caledon	27	17	Bramalea Road	
Peel	Caledon	30	19	Regional Road 7 (Airport Road) – Caledon East	
Peel	Caledon	35	22	Regional Road 8 (The Gore Road)	
Peel	Caledon	37	23	Humber Station Road – Bolton	
York	Vaughan	40	25	Highway 427 south	
York	Vaughan	44	27	Regional Road 27 (Highway 27) – Kleinburg, Nobleton	Formerly Highway 27 (Note: York Regional Road 27 carries the name "Highway 27", despite not being a provincial highway since January 1, 1998.)
York	Vaughan	51	32	Regional Road 56 (Weston Road)	Partial-access interchange with eastbound exit and westbound entrance
York	Vaughan	52	32	Highway 400	
1.000 mi = 1.609 km; 1.000 km = 0.621 mi: Unopened
