= Tullamore, Ontario =

Tullamore
- Industrial/Commercial Centre

- Location of Tullamore within Canada
- Coordinates: 43°47′28.4″N 79°45′30.89″W

Area
  - Total: 2.71 km^{2} (1.05 sq mi)

Population (2006)
  - Total: 6

Tullamore is a semi-rural community on the boundary of Brampton and Caledon in Ontario, Canada. It was named after the settlers who arrived from the Irish townland of 'Tully More' in County Sligo. The community is centred on the intersection of Airport and Mayfield Roads. It had a population of 6 in 2006. Many of the original Irish settlers gravesites can be found in St. Mary's Cemetery.

== Geography ==
Tullamore is located administratively within Caledon, Peel Region. There is urban residential development happening south of the community, within Brampton. It is located west of Mayfield West and Alloa, and east of Wildfield and Bolton (Other communities within Caledon).

== History ==
Prior to being part of the town of Caledon, the area was part of the Chinguacousy Township. In 1974, many small communities, including Tullamore, were merged into the new town of Caledon.

== Transportation ==
The enterprises in the area is served by Brampton Transit Route 30 (limited service), from Monday to Saturday.
