= 400-series highways =

Ontario freeway network

- Highway shields for Macdonald-Cartier Freeway and the Queen Elizabeth Way

- The current 400-series Highway network in Southern Ontario

System information
- Maintained by Ministry of Transportation of Ontario (MTO)
- Length: 1,997.3 km (1,241.1 mi)
- Formed: July 1, 1952

Highway names
- Provincial: Ontario Highway 4XX

System links
- Ontario provincial highways; Current; Former; 400-series

The 400-series highways are a network of controlled-access highways in the Canadian province of Ontario, forming a special subset of the provincial highway system. They are analogous to the Interstate Highway System in the United States or the Autoroute system of neighbouring Quebec, and are regulated by the Ministry of Transportation of Ontario (MTO). The 400-series designations were introduced in 1952, although Ontario had been constructing divided highways for two decades prior. Initially, only Highways 400, 401 and 402 were numbered; other designations followed in the subsequent decades. To this day, not all controlled-access highways in Ontario are a part of the 400-series highway network. The network is situated almost entirely in Southern Ontario, although Highway 400 extends into the more remote northern portion of the province.

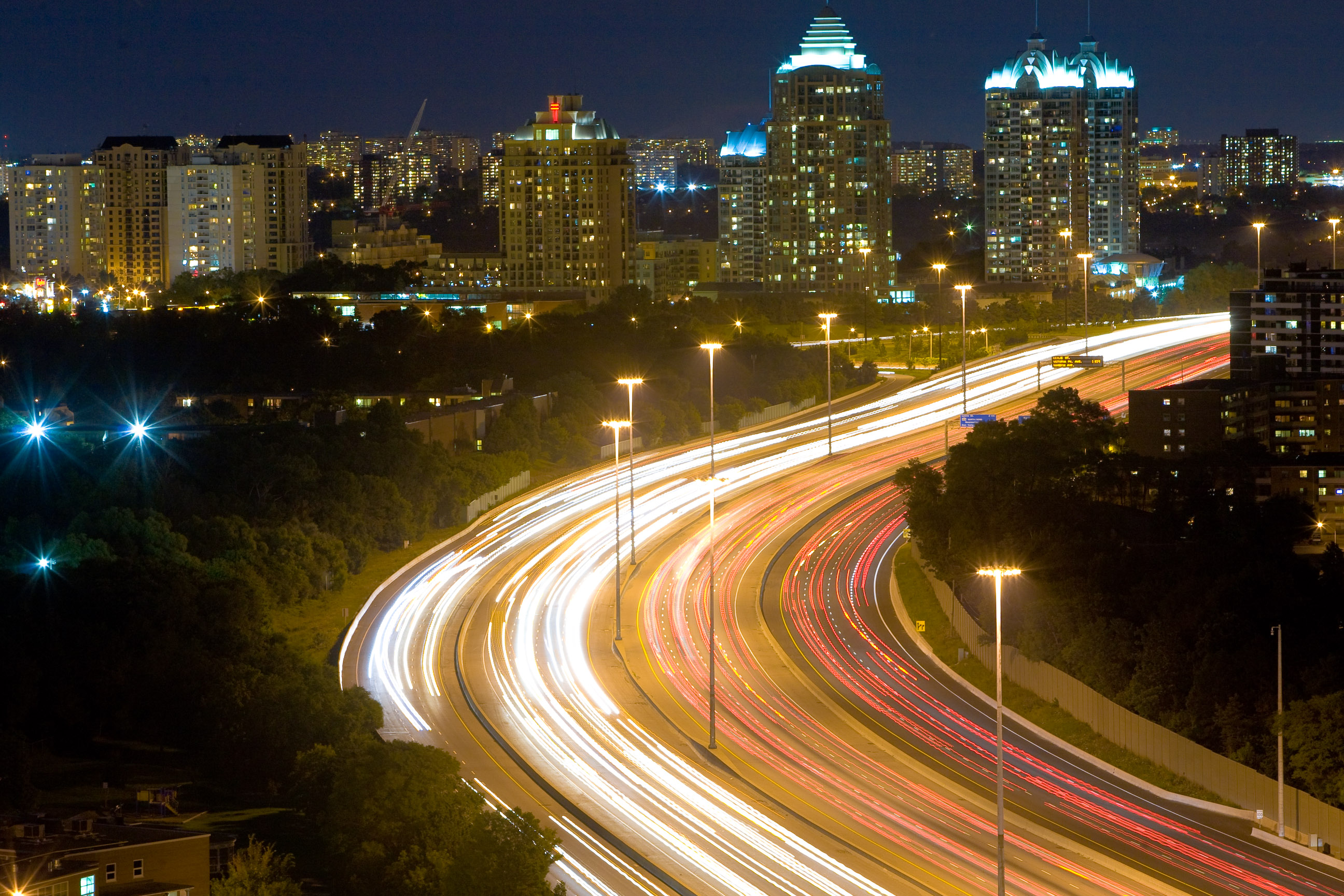

Modern 400-series highways have high design standards, speed limits of 110 km/h (68 mph), with lower limits on a few sections, and various collision avoidance and traffic management systems. The design of 400-series highways has set the precedent for a number of innovations used throughout North America, including the parclo interchange and a modified Jersey barrier called the Ontario Tall Wall. As a result, they currently experience one of the lowest accident and fatality rates comparative to traffic volume in North America.

== History ==
When the 400-series designations were first applied to Ontario freeways in 1952, several divided highways had already been opened in Southern Ontario. Originally inspired by German Autobahns, Minister of Highways Thomas McQuesten planned a network of "Dual Highways" across the southern half of the province during the 1930s. The Queen Elizabeth Way (QEW) was first, an upgrade to the partially constructed Middle Road in 1934. McQuesten also sought out the economic opportunities that came with linking Toronto to Detroit and New York state by divided roadways with interchanges at major crossroads. Although he no longer served as Minister of Highways by the onset of World War II, his ambitious plans would come to fruition in the following decades as Highways 400, 401, 402, 403 (between Woodstock and Hamilton), and 405.

The construction boom following the war resulted in many new freeway construction projects in the province. The Toronto–Barrie Highway (Highway 400), Trans-Provincial Highway (Highway 401), a short expansion of Highway 7 approaching the Blue Water Bridge in Sarnia (Highway 402), and an expansion of Highway 27 (eventually designated as Highway 427 by the mid-1970s) into part of the Toronto Bypass were all underway or completed by the early 1950s. Seeking a way to distinguish the controlled-access freeways from the existing two-lane King's Highways, the Department of Highways created the 400-series designations in 1952. By the end of the year, Highway 400, 401, and 402 were numbered, although they were only short stubs of their current lengths. Highway 401 was assembled across the province in a patchwork fashion, becoming fully navigable between Windsor and the Quebec border on November 10, 1964; Highway 400 was extended north to Coldwater on Christmas Eve 1959; Highway 402 was extended to London between 1972 and 1982.

In addition to this network backbone, plans for additional 400-series highways were initiated by the late 1950s, comprising the Chedoke Expressway (Highway 403) through Hamilton; the Don Valley Parkway Extension (Highway 404) northward from the soon-to-be constructed Toronto expressway; Highway 405 to connect with the American border near St. Catharines; Highway 406 south from St. Catharines to Welland; Highway 407 encircling the Greater Toronto Area (GTA), though not built for another 40 years; Highway 409 to connect Highway 401 with Toronto International Airport; and The Queensway (Highway 417) through Ottawa. The first sections of these freeways were opened in 1963, 1977, 1963, 1965, 1997, 1974, and 1960, respectively.

Throughout the 1960s and 1970s, additional freeways were planned or built, including Highway 427 in Toronto, Highway 403 through Mississauga, Highway 410 north to Brampton and Highway 416 to connect Highways 401 and 417. Highway 420 was designated in Niagara Falls, though it had been built as part of the QEW in 1941. Other major works included the skyway bridges along the QEW and the expansion of Highway 401 through most of Toronto into twelve-lane collector–express systems.

By the mid-1980s, the network had more-or-less taken its current shape, with only Highways 407, 412, 416 and 418 yet to be built. Instead, emphasis was placed on expanding existing routes to accommodate increasing traffic volumes. However, extensions of Highway 400 towards Parry Sound, Highway 403 between Woodstock and Hamilton, Highway 404 towards Newmarket, and Highway 427 towards Vaughan were underway. By the end of the decade, construction of Highway 407 and Highway 416 had begun, and Highway 410 was expanded from two to four lanes.

Highways 407 and 416 opened in the late 1990s. Until early 2015, Highways 407 and 416 were the most-recently designated (and constructed) freeways in Ontario. This has changed with the construction of Highways 412 and 418. In addition to these new additions to the 400-series network, several extensions of existing freeways have been built or are underway, including Highway 410 north of Brampton in 2009, Highway 400 to north of Parry Sound in 2010, Highway 417 to Arnprior in 2012, Highway 404 to Keswick in 2014, Highway 401 through Windsor in 2015, and four-laning Highway 406 to Welland in late 2015.

== Design standards ==
The 400-series highways always have a minimum 4 lane cross-section with grade separation at all junctions. Interchanges tend to be spaced at least 1.5 kilometres apart in urban areas unless there are basket weave ramps or collector lanes to facilitate shorter merge distances. In rural areas, interchanges tend to be spaced at least 3 kilometres apart, although exceptions exist. When the cross-section of highway is larger than 10 lanes, the road is usually arranged into a local–express lane system, which exist on sections of Highways 400, 401, 403, 404 and 427. On all but a few interchanges in the whole system, ramps merge freely on the highway except if there are ramp meters in use, and stop or yield controlled ramps are rare. An interchange with stop-controlled ramps onto Highway 400 at Canal Road was permanently closed on 10 June 2025.

While older freeways have some lapses in safety features, contemporary 400-series highways have design speeds of 130 km/h (81 mph), speed limits ranging from 80 km/h (50 mph) to 110 km/h (68 mph), various collision avoidance and traffic management systems, and several design standards adopted throughout North America. Of note are the Ontario Tall Wall median barrier and the Parclo A-4 interchange design, the latter which became standard in the design for the widening of Highway 401 through Toronto in 1962. The Institute of Traffic Engineers subsequently recommended this design to replace the cloverleaf interchange throughout North America. Ontario highways rank fourth in North America for fatality rates, with 0.61 fatalities per 10,000 licensed drivers in 2017. However, this also includes two-lane provincial highways.

Conforming with the Manual on Uniform Traffic Control Devices for Canada, Ontario utilizes green signs for guidance purposes, including distances to nearby interchanges and destinations. Generally, blue signage is used to list services and attractions at upcoming exits, known as Tourism-Oriented Directional Signing. However, several exceptions exist, notably blue guidance signage for toll highways such as Highway 407, in addition to the collector lanes of highways. The baseline standard for the construction of or expansion to a freeway in Ontario is an average daily traffic count of 10,000 vehicles per day. However, other factors are considered as well, particularly future traffic volume forecasts. To promote economic development in a disadvantaged region (e.g., the current extension of Highway 400 to Northern Ontario), a 400-series highway may be built where the existing highway's traffic counts fall below 10,000.

The MTO plans and finances the construction and maintenance of the King's Highway system, which includes the 400-series network. The system includes 1,971.8 kilometres (1,225.2 mi) of freeways. Highway 401 is the longest freeway at 828.0 kilometres (514.5 mi), in addition to being the widest and busiest road in Canada. Highway 420 is the shortest of the routes at 3.3 kilometres (2.1 mi).

There are four examples of 400 series standard highways in Ontario that are not signed as such. The Gardiner Expressway between Highway 427 and Parklawn Road was originally built as a section of QEW (Hwy 451) and therefore is built to 400-series standards but lost its QEW designation after being downloaded to the City of Toronto. The section of Highway 7 between the town of Carleton Place and its junction with Highway 417 is also built to 400-series standards, but a 400-series designation has yet to be applied. Highway 69 between Sudbury and Key River is built to 400-series standards in anticipation of it becoming part of Highway 400 once the 70-kilometre (43 mi) gap between the two freeways is filled. Highway 115 north of Highway 35/Highway 115 concurrency and Peterborough is also built to 400-series standards, however a 400-series designation has yet to be applied. Most other freeways and expressways in Ontario that lack a 400-series designation have lower construction standards, lower design speeds and lower speed limits.

== High-occupancy vehicle lanes ==
Map showing locations of HOV lanes in the province as of September 2021

The MTO began planning for the use of high-occupancy vehicle (HOV) lanes with the HOV Opportunities Study, contracted to McCormick Rankin in 2001. This led to the test trial of three HOV lanes in the GTA in December 2005: southbound Highway 404 between Highway 7 and Highway 401, with a dedicated HOV ramp built to connect with westbound Highway 401, and Highway 403 in both directions between Highway 407 and Highway 401 in Mississauga. Since then, HOV lanes have been opened on several 400-series freeways around the Golden Horseshoe and National Capital Region. In May 2007, the MTO introduced a multibillion-dollar Horseshoe Network Project, which included plans to incorporate HOV lanes into numerous 400-series highways.

By then, work was already advanced on several projects, including the northbound HOV lane on Highway 404 (that opened on July 23, 2007) and an HOV lane along both directions of Highway 403 between Highway 407 and Highway 401. A third pair of HOV lanes has since been introduced to the QEW/403 through Oakville, and a fourth individual HOV lane travels eastbound on Highway 417 from just west of Eagleson Road in Ottawa to just east of Moodie Drive.

More than 450 kilometres (280 mi) of HOV lanes are currently proposed for construction by 2040. Future plans include extending existing HOV lanes and introducing them to other 400-series freeways. as of October 2014, two projects have been confirmed: Highway 410 between Highway 401 and Queen Street in Brampton, and Highway 427 between Highway 409 and Highway 7. The MTO has stated that HOV lanes will only be introduced through new construction and that no general-purpose lanes will be converted. The general goals of the project are to help increase highway efficiency (an HOV lane is claimed by the Ontario government to have the ability to move as many people as four general-purpose lanes), reduce congestion, conserve energy and help protect the environment.

During the 2015 Pan American Games and 2015 Parapan American Games held in Toronto, several HOV lanes had their minimum requirements increased from two passengers to three, and some highways had their general-purpose lanes temporarily converted to HOV lanes to accommodate increased traffic. These temporary restrictions lasted from June 29 to August 18.

2021 saw several new HOV lanes opened. The southbound HOV lane on Highway 400 between King Road and Major Mackenzie Drive was opened on September 11, 2021; while the northbound lane opened two months later on November 11. The Highway 427 extension, which opened on September 18, included an HOV lane north of Finch Avenue.

=== Future HOV lanes ===
The following table lists planned expansions to the HOV network by 2040.

Near-term (anticipated completion by 2027)
Highway	Starting location	Terminating location	General location	Status
400	Langstaff Road	Major Mackenzie Drive	Region of York	Lane construction underway
QEW	Trafalgar Road	Winston Churchill Boulevard	Regional Municipality of Halton	Lane and bridge construction underway

Long-term (2028–)
Highway	Starting location	Terminating location	General location	Distance
400	Highway 9	Highway 425	Region of York and Simcoe County	10 km (6.2 mi)
400	Highway 425	Duckworth Street	Simcoe County, Innisfil and Barrie	36 km (22.4 mi)
401	Regional Road 25	Highway 6 South, Brock Road	Regional Municipality of Halton and Wellington County	20 km (12.4 mi)
401	Highway 6 South, Brock Road	Townline Road	Wellington County, Cambridge and Guelph	13.5 km (8.4 mi)
401	Highway 8	Homer Watson Boulevard, Fountain Street	Region of Waterloo	3.5 km (2.2 mi)
404	Stouffville Road	Ravenshoe Road, Woodbine Avenue	Region of York	28.5 km (17.7 mi)
407	Lake Ridge Road	Highway 418	Region of Durham	22 km (13.7 mi)
410	Queen Street	Bovaird Drive	Brampton	3.7 km (2.3 mi)
417	Palladium Drive	Highway 7	Ottawa	3.5 km (2.2 mi)
QEW	Red Hill Valley Parkway	Highway 406	Hamilton and Region of Niagara	39.5 km (24.5 mi)
QEW	North Shore Boulevard	Guelph Line	Burlington	6.2 km (3.9 mi)
QEW	Winston Churchill Boulevard	Highway 427	Oakville and Mississauga	15 km (9.5 mi)

== Planned extensions and new routes ==
Highway	Type	Length (km)	Length (mi)	Southern or western terminus	Northern or eastern terminus	Status	Proposed Opening Date	Notes
Highway 400	Extension	~138	~86	Highway 559 near Parry Sound	Highway 17 in Sudbury	Partially Open / Under Construction	Early 2030s	Completed sections numbered as Highway 69
Highway 404	Extension	~31	~19	Regional Road 8 in Keswick	Highway 12 north of Sunderland	Proposed	Early 2030s	
Highway 410	Extension	~3	~2	Highway 10 in Brampton	Future Highway 413 north of Brampton	Funded	Early 2030s	Part of the Highway 413 project
Highway 413	New Route	~52	~32	Highway 401 and Highway 407 in NW Mississauga	Highway 400 north of Vaughan	Funded	Early 2030s	
Highway 417	Extension	~16	~10	Highway 60 in Renfrew	Campbell Drive west of Arnprior	Proposed	Late 2030s	
Highway 425	New Route	~16	~10	Highway 400 near Bradford	Highway 404 south of Keswick	Funded / Under Construction	Late 2020s	The "Bradford Bypass". Construction began at the Yonge Street interchange in November 2022
Highway 427	Extension	~2	~2	Regional Road 25 south of Bolton	Future Highway 413 South of Bolton	Funded	Early 2030s	Part of the Highway 413 project

== Existing network ==
Number	Length (km)	Length (mi)	Southern or western terminus	Northern or eastern terminus	Local names	Formed	Removed	Notes
Highway 400	226.0	140.4	Maple Leaf Drive in Toronto (continues as Black Creek Drive)	Highway 69 in Carling	Toronto–Barrie Highway	1952	current	Scheduled for extension to Sudbury.
Highway 401	828.0	514.5	Gordie Howe International Bridge in Windsor	A-20 towards Montreal, QC	Macdonald–Cartier Freeway, Rt. Hon. Herb Gray Parkway, Highway of Heroes	1952	current	Busiest highway in North America.
Highway 402	102.5	63.7	I-69 / I-94 at Canada–United States border on Blue Water Bridge in Point Edward	Highway 401 in London		1953	current	
Highway 403	125.2	77.8	Highway 401 near Woodstock	Highway 401 / Highway 410 in Mississauga	Chedoke Expressway, Alexander Graham Bell Parkway	1963	current	
Highway 404	50.1	31.1	Highway 401 / DVP in Toronto	Regional Road 8 (Woodbine Avenue) in East Gwillimbury		1977	current	
Highway 405	8.7	5.4	Queen Elizabeth Way – St. Catharines	I-190 at Canada–United States border on Queenston-Lewiston Bridge towards Lewiston, NY	General Brock Parkway	1963	current	
Highway 406	26.0	16.2	East Main Street in Welland	Queen Elizabeth Way in St. Catharines		1965	current	
407 ETR / Highway 407	151.4	94.1	Highway 403 / Queen Elizabeth Way in Burlington	Highway 35 / Highway 115 in Clarington		1997	current	Freeway divided into two sections: 407 ETR, with the latter tolled and privately operated, and Highway 407E; tolls removed on Highway 407E effective June 1, 2025
Highway 409	5.6	3.5	Pearson Airport in Mississauga	Highway 401 in Toronto	Belfield Expressway	1978	current	
Highway 410	20.3	12.6	Highway 401 / Highway 403 in Mississauga	Highway 10 (Hurontario Street) in Caledon		1978	current	
Highway 412	10.0	6.2	Highway 401 in Whitby	Highway 407 in Whitby	West Durham Link	2016	current	Route number assigned February 5, 2015; tolls removed effective April 5, 2022
Highway 416	76.4	47.5	Highway 401 towards Brockville	Highway 417 in Ottawa	Veterans Memorial Highway	1999	current	
Highway 417	192.0	119.3	Highway 17 in Arnprior	A-40 (TCH) towards Montreal, QC	Queensway, Trans-Canada Highway	1971	current	Unlike most freeways, kilometre posts are numbered east to west.
Highway 418	12.8	8.0	Highway 401 in Clarington	Highway 407 in Clarington	East Durham Link	2019	current	Route number assigned February 5, 2015; tolls removed effective April 5, 2022
Highway 420	3.3	2.1	Regional Road 98 (Montrose Road)	US 62 at Canada–United States border on Rainbow Bridge in Niagara Falls	Niagara Veterans Memorial Highway	1941	current	
Highway 427	27	17	Queen Elizabeth Way/Gardiner Expressway in Toronto	Regional Road 25 (Major Mackenzie Drive) in Vaughan		1971	current	6.6-kilometre (4.1 mi) extension to Regional Road 25 (Major Mackenzie Drive) opened September 18, 2021
Queen Elizabeth Way	139.1	86.4	I-190 at Canada–United States border on Peace Bridge in Fort Erie	Highway 427/Gardiner Expressway in Toronto		1937	current	Internally referred to as Highway 451 in the Ontario Ministry of Transportation

== Gallery ==
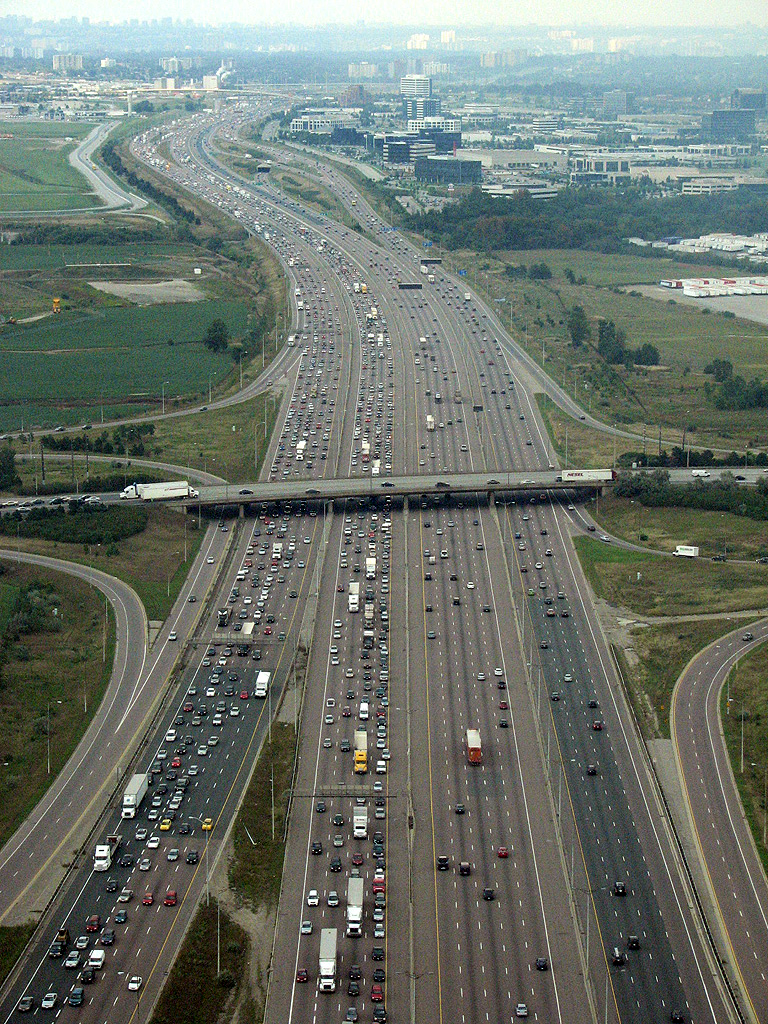
Highway 401 south of Pearson Airport is the widest freeway in Canada, and one of the widest and busiest in the world.

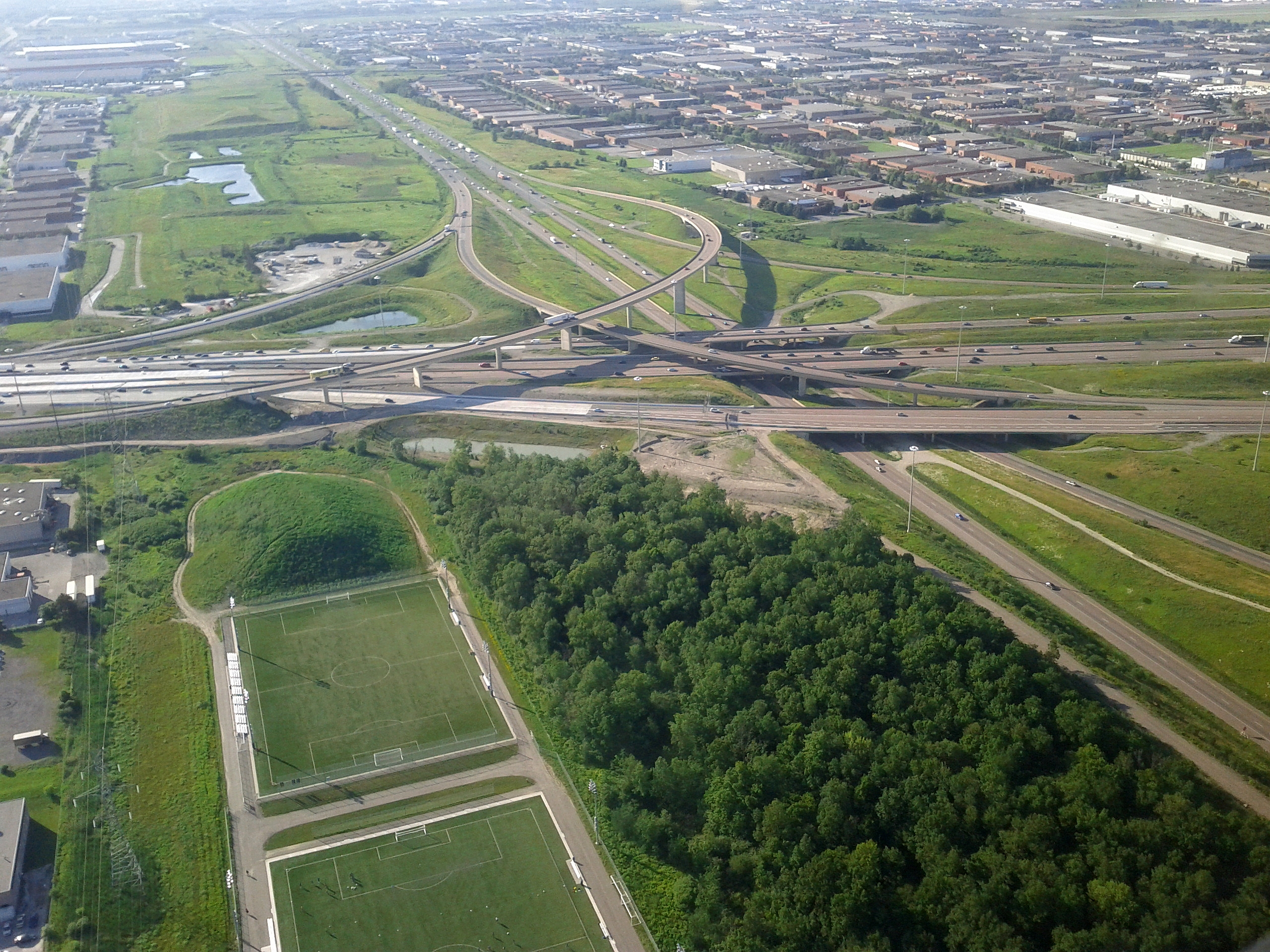
Aerial view of the interchange between Highway 401, 403 and 410 in Mississauga

An aerial view of Highway 416 approaching Ottawa

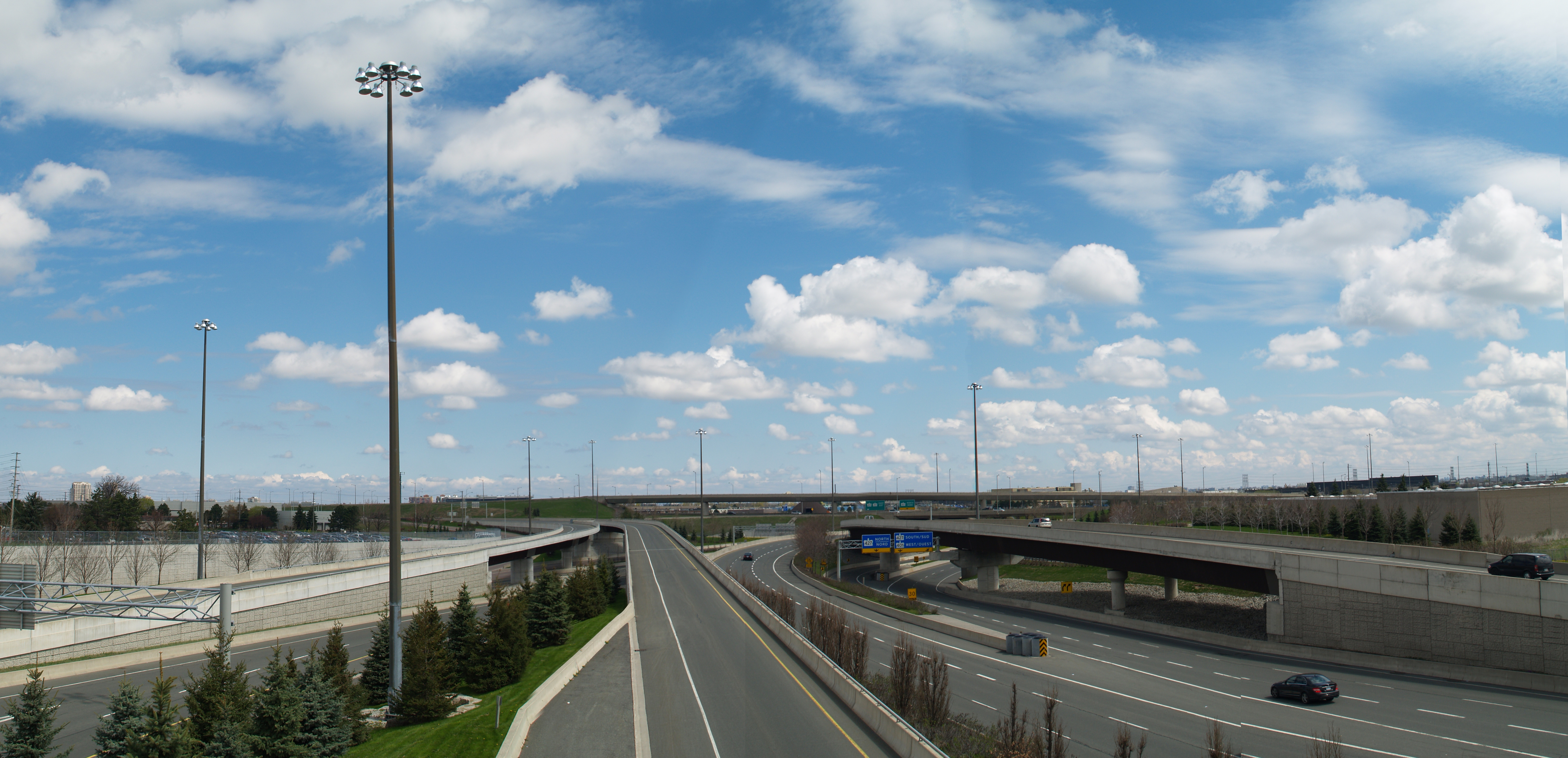
A sprawling interchange between Highway 409 and 427 in Etobicoke, one of several in the Greater Toronto Area

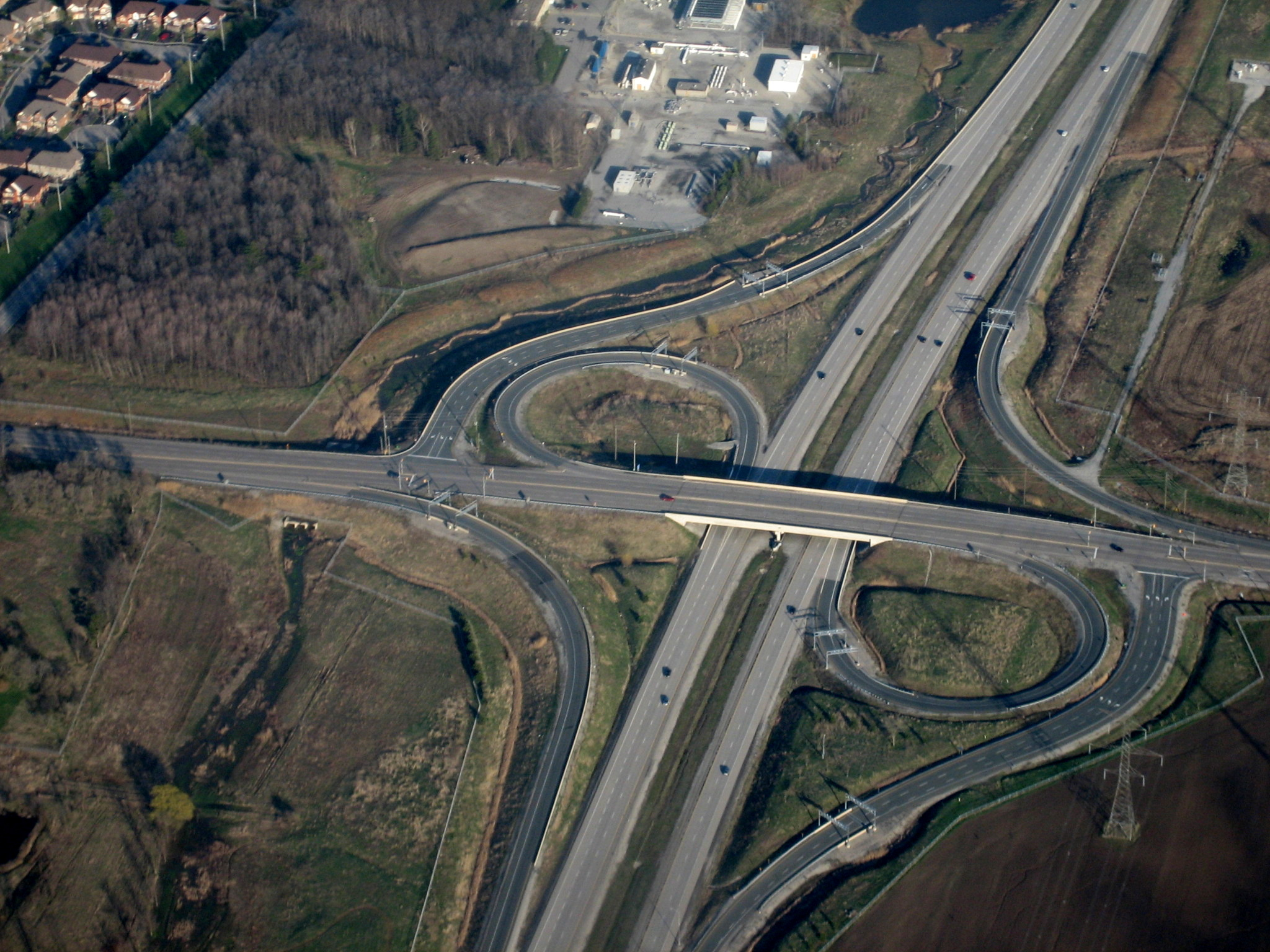
The Parclo interchange design is used throughout the 400-series network.

== See also ==
- List of provincial highways in Ontario
- 100-Series Highways of Nova Scotia
- 400-series Highways of British Columbia
- Quebec Autoroutes
