= Wildfield, Ontario =

Wildfield
- Hamlet
- Location of Wildfield within Canada Wildfield (Canada)
- Coordinates: 43°49′10.6″N 79°43′38.8″W
- Country: Canada
- Province: Ontario
- Regional Municipality: Peel
- Town: Caledon

Wildfield is a small rural hamlet located within the town of Caledon in Ontario, Canada.

== Geography ==
The hamlet is located north of the intersection of The Gore Road and Mayfield Road, directly on the border with the neighboring city of Brampton and located next to the large communities of Bolton and Mayfield West. Situated within the Golden Horseshoe region, the area topography features rolling hills, forests, streams, and proximity to Niagara Escarpment. The local lands consists of rich agricultural land, , lakes, woodlands, and various parks.

== History ==
Originally inhabited by Indigenous peoples, the area later saw the arrival of European settlers in the 19th century, drawn by the promise of fertile land and abundant natural resources. These pioneers established farms and homesteads, shaping the agricultural landscape that still characterizes Wildfield today. The community grew steadily over the years, with the construction of small villages entouring the area and the establishment of local industries such as milling and logging, similarly to Alton. The history of Wildfield and the O’Reilly family dates back to the 1830s, with Dan O’Reilly, a descendant of the original settlers, deeply proud of his heritage. As a volunteer historian and advocate for preserving local history, Dan recently commemorated another milestone by dedicating a new road built in the lower developments in Brampton: Sister O’Reilly Road on June 19. The road honors Dan's aunt, Sister Eugene O’Reilly, who dedicated herself to teaching at St. Patrick's School in the hamlet for three decades. Dan's efforts reflect a commitment to preserving the rich history of the village amidst rapid modernization in Mayfield West.
