= Trinity Common Mall =

Outdoor shopping centre in Brampton, Ontario, Canada

Coordinates: 43.730375°N 79.76451°W

Trinity Common Mall (often referred to by residents as 'Trinity') is a large outdoor shopping centre in the city of Brampton, Ontario, Canada. With over 850,000 square feet (79,000 m^{2}) of retail space and more than 60 outlets, the shopping centre primarily serves the growing populations of both northern Brampton and nearby Caledon, Ontario. Phase one of the mall opened in the fall of 1999 and phase two was completed in the summer of 2004.

Trinity Common Mall is located on the northeast corner of Highway 410 and Bovaird Drive and is served by Brampton Transit and GO Transit.

== Anchors ==
- Canadian Tire
- The Home Depot
- HomeSense
- Metro
- Sport Chek
- Staples
- SilverCity
