= Ontario Highway 412 =

400-series highway in Ontario

Highway 412
- West Durham Link
- Highway 412 highlighted in red

Route information
- Maintained by Ministry of Transportation of Ontario
- Length: 8.9 km (5.5 mi)
- History: Proposed 1990s; Opened June 20, 2016

Major junctions
- South end: Highway 401 in Whitby
- Regional Highway 2 Regional Road 4 Highway 7
- North end: Highway 407 in Whitby

Location
- Country: Canada
- Province: Ontario

Highway system
- Ontario provincial highways; Current; Former; 400-series
← Highway 410	→ Highway 413

King's Highway 412, or simply Highway 412, is a controlled-access highway and former tolled highway in the Canadian province of Ontario. The route is 8.9 km (5.5 mi) long, connecting Highway 401 with the eastern extension of Highway 407. The route lies entirely within Whitby in the Regional Municipality of Durham, travelling within one kilometre of the border between Whitby and Ajax and Pickering (Lake Ridge Road).

During planning, the route was known as the West Durham Link. Its designation as Highway 412, the first new 400-series designation in several decades, was confirmed along with Highway 418 on February 6, 2015. Although initially planned to open in October 2015, the opening was delayed until June 20, 2016. Highway 412 opened alongside the extension of Highway 407 (Highway 407E) from Brock Road in Pickering to Harmony Road in Oshawa. The Ministry of Transportation of Ontario (MTO) thus decided to compensate for delays by waiving all tolls until February 1, 2017. On April 5, 2022, Highway 412 became toll-free.

The speed limit is 110 km/h (68 mph). The route is patrolled by the Ontario Provincial Police (OPP) and maintained by the Ministry of Transportation of Ontario (MTO).

== Route description ==
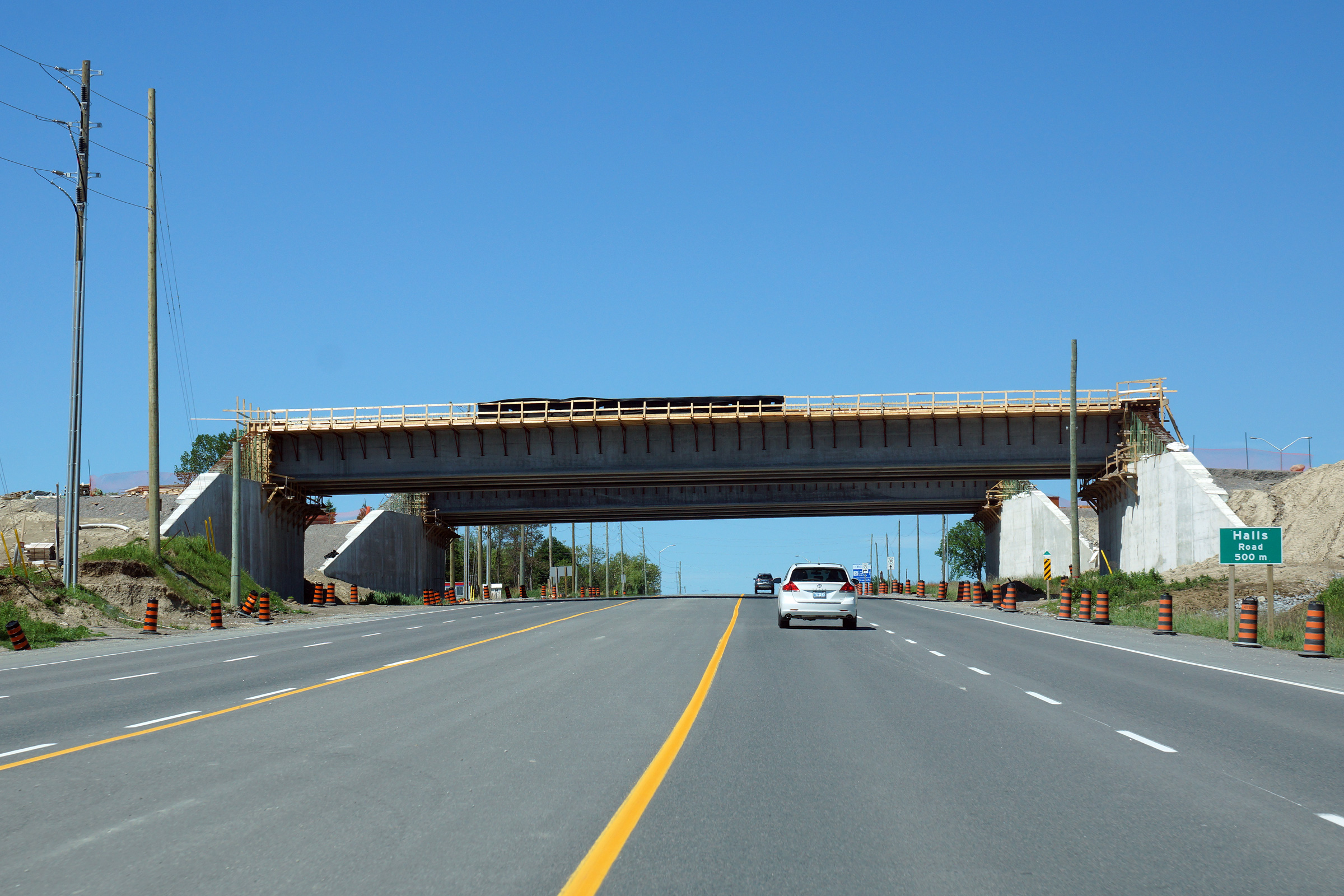
Highway 7 passing westerly beneath the still under construction Highway 412 overpass, in June 2015

Highway 412 is an 8.9-kilometre (5.5 mi) four-lane highway extending from Highway 401 to Highway 407E, just north of Highway 7. The entire length of the route lies between Lakeridge Road and Coronation Road, within Whitby. At the southern end, the route begins at a semi-directional T interchange with Highway 401, from which it proceeds north. It crosses Dundas Street (former Highway 2), where a partial interchange provides access to the north and from the south.

North of Dundas Street, the route swerves westward onto the alignment of Halls Road and crosses Rossland Road; a future interchange is planned at this location. It continues north to an interchange with Taunton Road before diverging east from the Halls Road alignment to travel parallel between it and Coronation Road. The route crosses Highway 7 (Winchester Road), where a partial interchange provides southbound access and a northbound exit; a commuter carpool parking lot lay on the northwest corner. Immediately north of Highway 7, the route ends at a three-level semi-directional T interchange with Highway 407E, which was a toll route; ETC cameras were present along the onramps.

== History ==
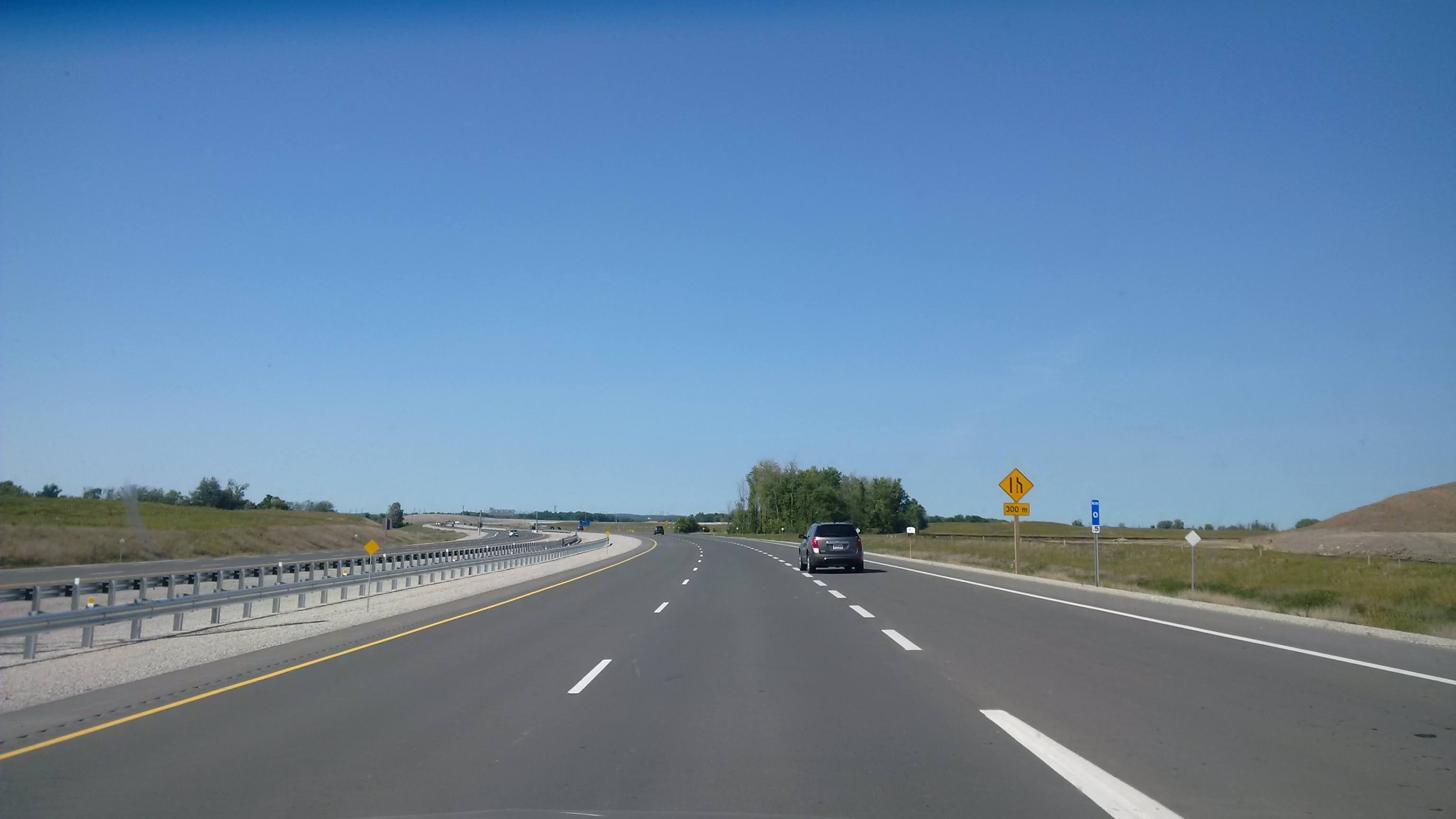
Highway 412 in Whitby, looking North, in September 2016.

The West Durham Link, as it was then known, was first presented to Whitby Council on February 10, 1992. It quickly drew the ire of local residents fearful of noise levels and the environmental effects on Lynde Creek. However, the recession of the mid-1990s resulted in Highway 407 being truncated in Markham temporarily. Slightly revised plans for the links appeared on the June 2007 Technically Recommended Route Report for the extension of Highway 407 to Highway 35/115, which was submitted as part of the environmental assessment (EA) for the extension, but had been announced earlier that year on March 7 by the Government of Canada, as part of an investment in Greater Toronto Area infrastructure.

The EA report was released on August 17, 2009, including detailed plans for the configuration of the interchanges along the new highway. The route would run parallel to and east of Lake Ridge Road, partially overlapping the current route of Halls Road and partially along a new alignment one lot to the east. Both Halls Road and Coronation Road will be re-aligned to accommodate the new highway. It would be six lanes throughout its length, with a concrete Ontario Tall Wall as a median. Highway 412 will cut into Lynde Creek, a small waterway that flows out to Lake Ontario.

Construction on the new highway was underway by late 2013. As a prerequisite, the section of Highway 401 near the Lake Ridge Road overpass was shifted northward on a new alignment away from the parallel railway line to allow sufficient right-of-way for the interchange to the new highway. The existing Lake Ridge Road overpass was also replaced by a new longer structure that would span both the existing and new alignments of Highway 401 as well as the railway lines. Once the new alignment of Highway 401 was opened for both directions, the old Highway 401 right-of-way was used for the semi-directional onramp from Highway 401 eastbound to the new highway as well as an offramp to Lake Ridge Road. On February 6, 2015, it was announced by the MTO that the West Durham Link would be designated Highway 412. Whitby Town Council had recommended to the province the route be named after Jim Flaherty.

Although initially expected to be completed on December 18, 2015, delays resulted in the opening being postponed until June 2016. The highway was opened, alongside Highway 407E between Brock Road in Pickering and Harmony Road in Oshawa, on June 20, 2016.

To compensate for opening delays, tolls were waived until the end of January 2017.

On February 18, 2022, the Government of Ontario announced that Highway 412 would become toll-free from April 5, 2022, together with Ontario Highway 418.

== Former tolling ==
Former white-on-blue toll shield with toll tab.

From June 1, 2019 to April 5, 2022, the following tolls applied for motorists utilizing Highway 412, which were permanently removed to become free-of-charge on the latter date.

Time Period	Duty Class		
Time Period	Light	Heavy	Heavy Multi-unit
Peak (Weekdays) (6am-10am and 3pm-7pm)	29.66 ¢/km	59.32 ¢/km	88.97 ¢/km
Midday (Weekdays) (10am-3pm)	23.52 ¢/km	47.04 ¢/km	70.57 ¢/km
Midday (Weekends & Holidays) (11am-7pm)	22.50 ¢/km	45.00 ¢/km	67.50 ¢/km
Off Peak (Weekdays) (7pm-6am)	19.43 ¢/km	38.86 ¢/km	58.29 ¢/km
Off Peak (Weekends & Holidays) (7pm-11am)	19.43 ¢/km	38.86 ¢/km	58.29 ¢/km

- Same toll rates of Highway 407E were applied here.
- All end times displayed were rounded up to the nearest minute for simplicity purposes (i.e. 6 am is actually 5:59:59 am)
- The toll rate that applied to a specific trip was determined by the time at which a vehicle enters the highway and the cumulative distance traveled on both Highways 412 and 407E.
- Users of both 407 ETR and Highways 407E/412/418 only received one bill invoice, with trips on each highway specified.
- 407 ETR Transponders were compatible with Highways 407E, 412, and later 418.
- Heavy goods vehicles and lorries were assessed a minimum toll regardless of the length of their trip.
- Light vehicles without transponders were usually assessed an additional Video Toll.
- Vehicles weighing over 5,000 kilograms were divided into two categories: Heavy Single Units and Heavy Multiple Units. Heavy Multiple Unit Vehicles were charged two or three time the passenger rate, depending on the size of the vehicle.
- All Heavy Unit vehicles were legally required to have transponders in order to use the highways; offenders were penalized under the Highway Traffic Act.

== Exit list ==
The following table lists the major junctions along Highway 412. The entire route is located in Whitby, within the Regional Municipality of Durham. The following are the exits listed in the 407 East Environmental Assessment Report. Lengths are approximated with Google Maps.

km	mi	Exit	Destinations	Notes
0.0	0.0	—	Highway 401 – Kingston, Toronto	Highway 401 exit 408
0.7	0.43	1	Regional Highway 2 (Dundas street)	Northbound entrance and southbound exit; formerly Highway 2
2.3	1.4	3	Rossland Road West	Interchange proposed
3.8	2.4	5	Regional Road 4 (Taunton Road)	
8.0	5.0	9	Highway 7 (Winchester Road) to Regional Road 3 east	Northbound exit and southbound entrance
8.9	5.5	—	Highway 407 – Toronto, Peterborough	Highway 407 exit 112
1.000 mi = 1.609 km; 1.000 km = 0.621 mi: Incomplete access; Unopened
