= Mayfield West, Ontario =

Mayfield West Southfields
- Neighbourhood
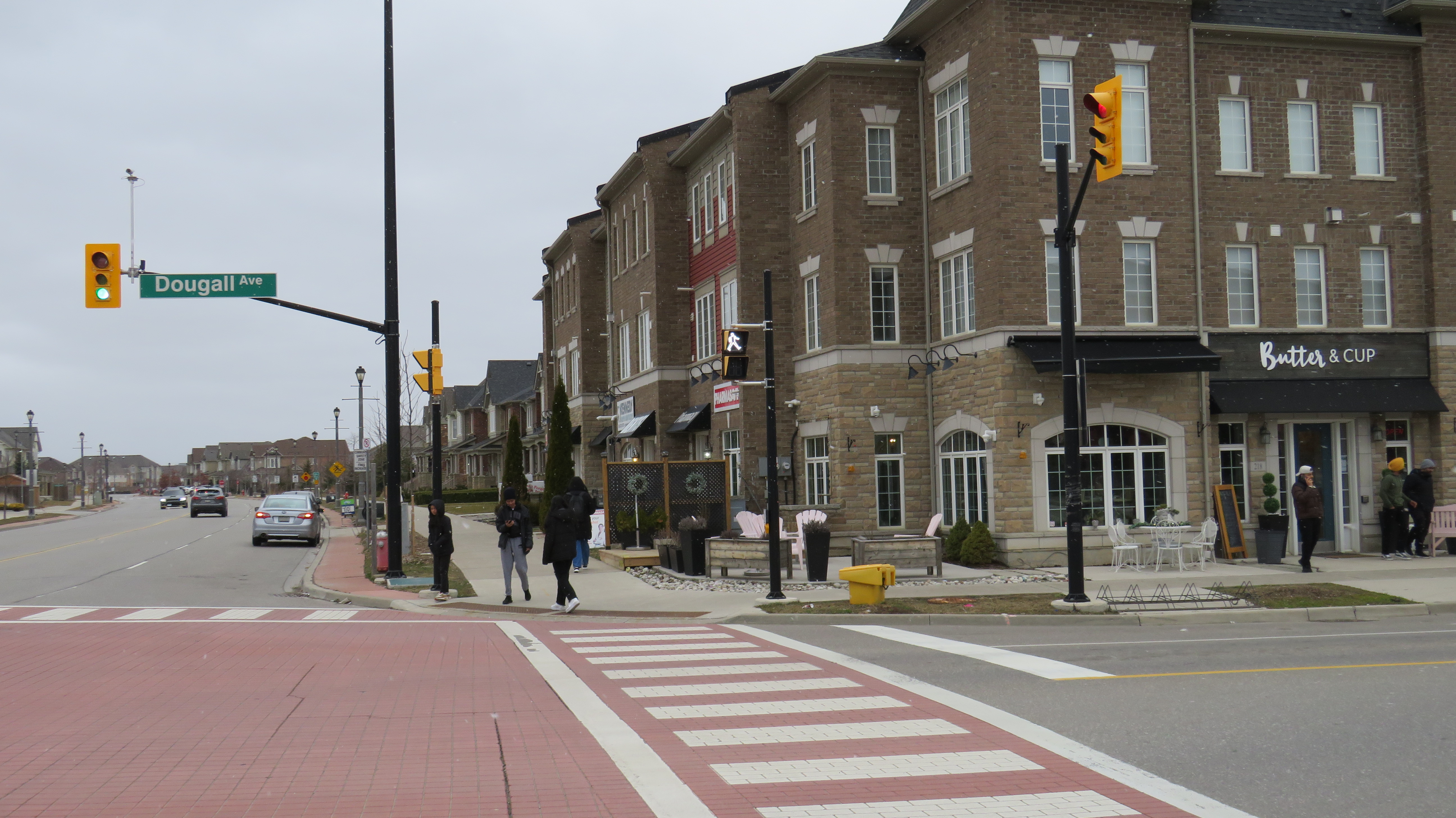
- Storefronts along Kennedy Road
- Interactive map of Mayfield West
- Coordinates: 43°45′23″N 79°49′45″W
- Country: Canada
- Province: Ontario
- Regional Municipality: Peel
- Town: Caledon

Government
  - MPs: Ruby Sahota (Brampton North—Caledon)
  - MPPs: Sylvia Jones (Dufferin—Caledon)

Population
  - Total: 14,800
- Postal code: L7C

Mayfield West (sometimes called Southfields) is a suburban neighbourhood located within the largely rural Town of Caledon, in Peel Region in Ontario, Canada, immediately adjacent to the City of Brampton. It has a population of 14,800 people.

== Description ==
Mayfield West is located in Ward 2 of Caledon. It is located on the northern boundary of Brampton, along Mayfield Road. It is also bounded by Chinguacousy Road to the west, Dixie Road to the east, and has an erratic northern boundary south of Old School Road. Near Highway 10, it surrounds the Brampton neighbourhood of Snelgrove, a former hamlet which extends slightly north of Mayfield, on three sides. Kennedy Road runs north-south through its centre, and is partly lined with storefronts as a new urbanism node within it.

== History ==
Mayfield West takes its name from the former small hamlet (and later ghost town) of Mayfield, which was located several kilometres to the east in the centre of what was Chinguacousy Township before the township was divided between Brampton and Caledon in 1974. It was mostly rural and surrounded by agricultural lands. Small-scale development was happening in Caledon at the time, mostly near established communities, chiefly due to its close proximity to Brampton. In the early 2000s, Mayfield West as a community began to grow as spillover growth from Brampton, and it has become one of the largest communities in Caledon. Currently, there are plans for further expansion of suburban development along the boundary of Brampton, with plans for said development to eventually connect with Bolton; today the largest community in Caledon.

== Education ==
The Peel District School Board operates two public schools in the community; the Dufferin-Peel Catholic District School Board operates a separate (Catholic) school; and the Conseil scolaire catholique MonAvenir operates a Catholic francophone school. There are four schools in Mayfield West:

- SouthFields Village Public School
- Tony Pontes Public School
- St. Evan Catholic Elementary School
- École élémentaire catholique Saint-Jean-Bosco

== Transportation ==
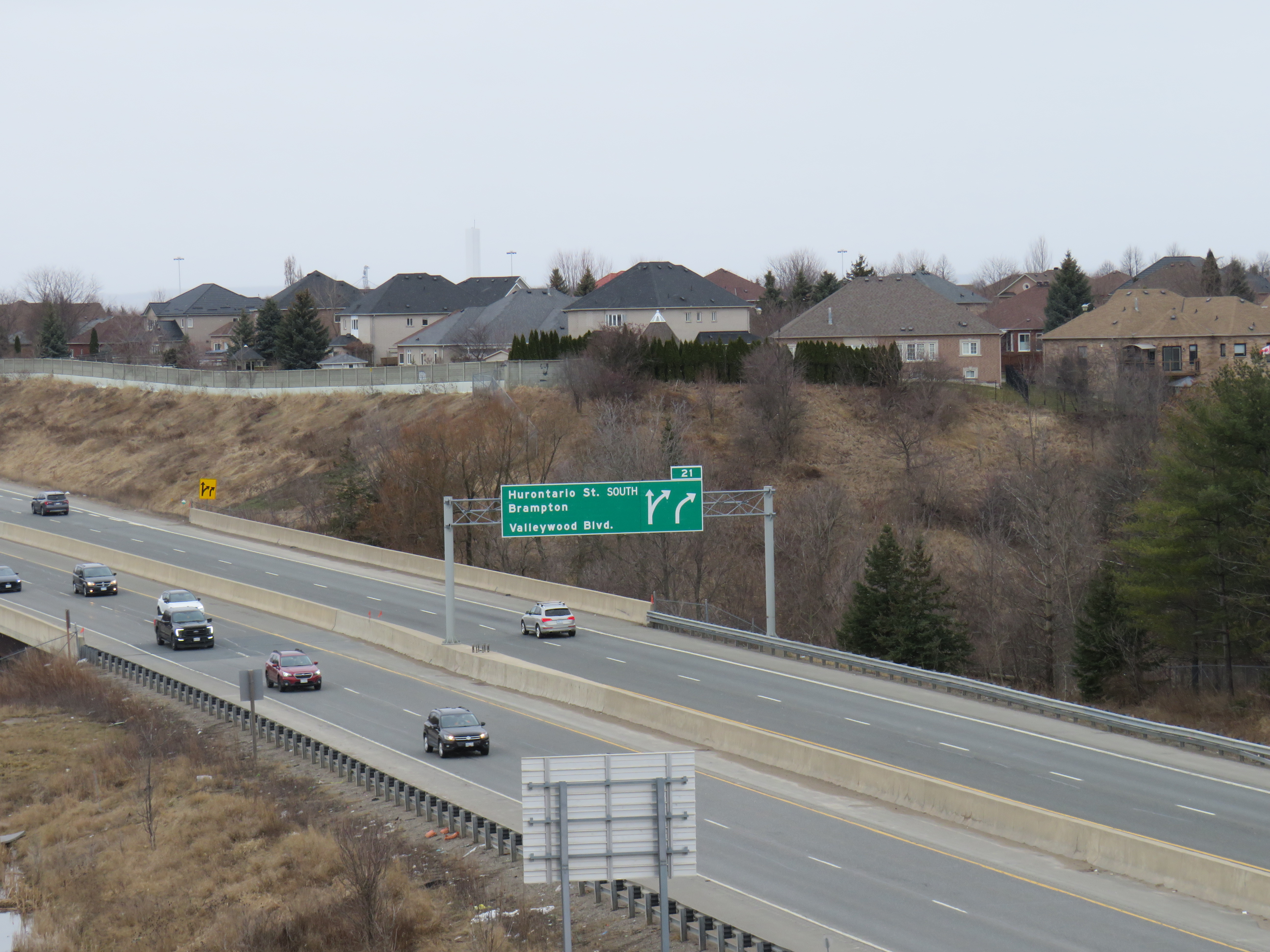
Highway 410 in Mayfield West

=== Roads ===
Highway 410 runs east-west through the neighbourhood, diverting from its predominantly north-south course as it swings westerly to connect with Highway 10, where it transitions into and turns north as the beginning of the latter highway. Hurontario Street runs southward from near the transition point and defaults via an overpass into Valleywood Boulevard northeastwards, with ramps connecting Hurontario with Highway 10, along which it officially continues.

Kennedy Road runs north-south through the neighbourhood, mostly on a new alignment. It was realigned to preserve rural homes on the original road, which is now named Old Kennedy Road. Mayfield Road runs east-west along its southern boundary with the City of Brampton.

=== Public transit ===
The Town of Caledon has no public transit of its own, but two Brampton Transit routes extend into Mayfield West and the immediate area: Route 81 Mayfield West serves Kennedy Road, and Route 18 Dixie provides limited service into industrial areas around the location of the former Mayfield hamlet along Dixie Road.
