= Snelgrove, Brampton =

Snelgrove
- Neighbourhood
- Interactive map of Snelgrove
- Coordinates: 43°44′02″N 79°49′28″W
- Country: Canada
- Province: Ontario
- Regional municipality: Peel
- City: Brampton, Ontario
- Postal codes: L7A and L67
- NTS Map: 030M12
- GNBC Code: FCPSS

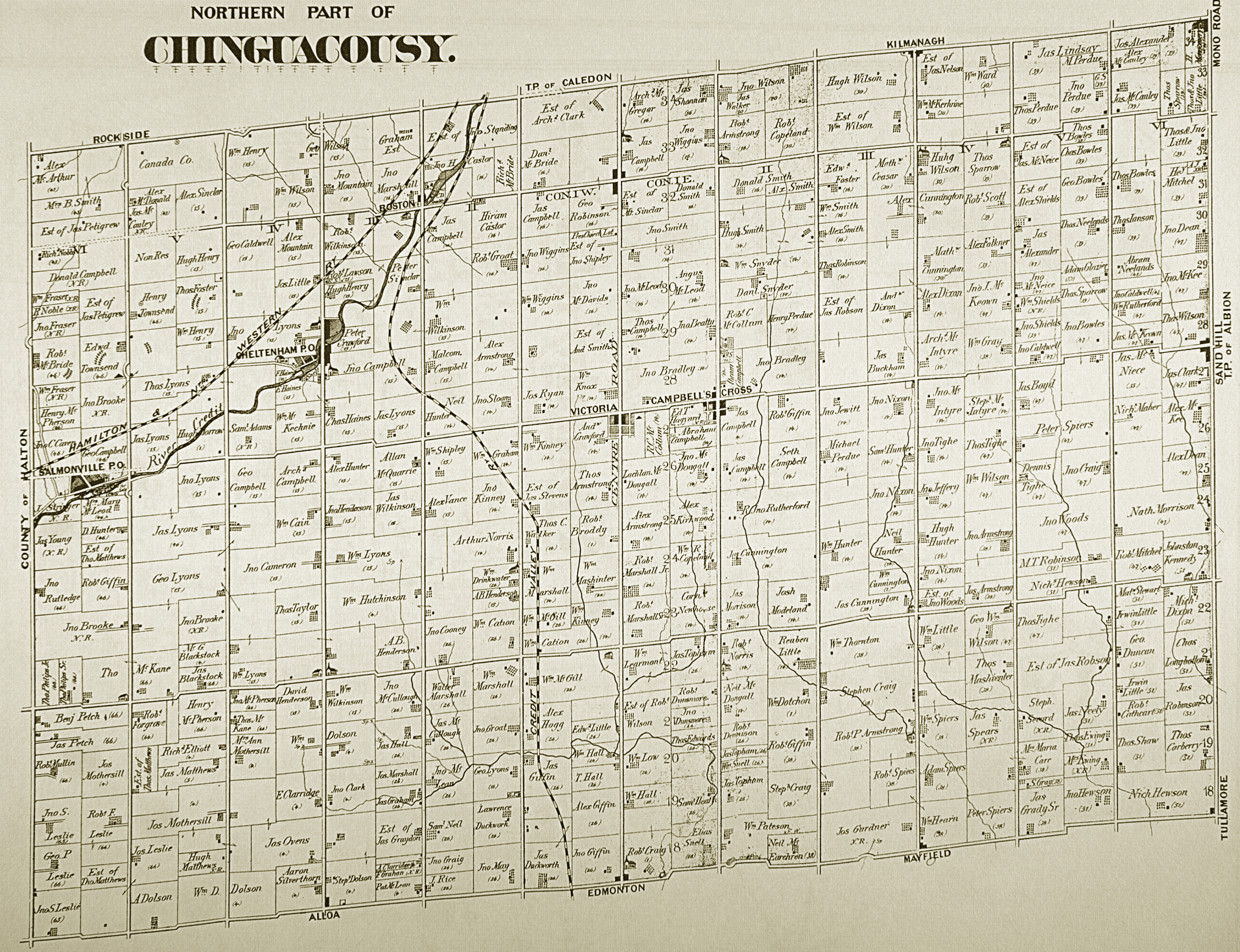
Snelgrove within Chinguacousy Township in an 1880 map, when it was known as Edmonton

Snelgrove is a suburban neighbourhood and former rural hamlet in Brampton, Ontario, Canada, bordering Brampton and the Town of Caledon and centred on the intersection of Hurontario Street and Mayfield Road.

The area's boundary creates a deviation in the Brampton/Caledon boundary, which is otherwise bisected by Mayfield Road, to include the entire community within Brampton, which was done when Chinguacousy Township was abolished and split between Brampton and Caledon in 1974. It is bounded in the west by an abandoned rail corridor west of Robertson Davies Drive, Collingwood and Highwood Roads in the north, just east of the Etobicoke Creek in the east, and approximately Wanless and Conservation Drives in the south.

Highway 410 ends immediately north of Snelgrove (in Caledon) by defaulting into northbound Highway 10 after passing under Hurontario Street, about 1 km north of Mayfield Road.

Major chains in Snelgrove include a Shoppers Drug Mart, Sobeys, and Tim Hortons.

== History ==
Originally known as Edmonton, it was renamed in the 1880s by the Canadian Pacific Railway, which ran through and had a passenger station in the community, to avoid confusion with another CPR station in what is now Edmonton, Alberta. The new name referred to John Snell and his family who settled in Chinguacousy Township in 1838.

When Hurricane Hazel struck Ontario in 1954, Snelgrove received the most rainfall of any Canadian location, with 214 mm (8.4 in) of rain.

The aforementioned CPR line (originally the Credit Valley Railway) from Streetsville to Owen Sound was sold in 2000 to shortline operators as the Orangeville Brampton Railway. Along with freight trains the OBRY operated a tourist train named the Credit Valley Explorer between 2004 and 2018, which ran south from Orangeville to Snelgrove, where it reversed to make the return trip. However, both operations proved unprofitable and the line was shut down and abandoned in 2021, with the last freight train running on December 17 of that year.
