= Ontario Highway 410 =

Controlled-access highway in Ontario

Highway 410
- Highway 410 highlighted in red

Route information
- Maintained by Ministry of Transportation of Ontario
- Length: 20.3 km (12.6 mi)
- History: Planned late-1960s; Opened November 15, 1978 – November 15, 2009

Major junctions
- South end: Highway 401 / Highway 403 – Mississauga
- 407 ETR – Brampton
- North end: Highway 10 (Hurontario Street) – Caledon

Location
- Country: Canada
- Province: Ontario

Highway system
- Ontario provincial highways; Current; Former; 400-series
← Highway 409	→ Highway 412

King's Highway 410, also known as Highway 410 and colloquially as the four-ten, is a 400-series highway in the Canadian province of Ontario that connects Highways 401 and 403 with Brampton. North of Brampton, the commuter freeway ends and becomes Highway 10, which continues north through Caledon to Owen Sound as a four-lane, undivided highway.

Highway 410 was built along the alignment of Heart Lake Road south of Bovaird Drive, while north of Bovaird Drive it was built along a new alignment. The highway was designated in 1978 between Highway 401 and Bovaird Drive (later Highway 7), though it was only two lanes wide and had at-grade intersections. It was widened throughout the 1980s and completed as a freeway in 1991. In 2003, construction began on a northward extension of the freeway that was completed in November 2009 which connected directly to Highway 10. Prior to being downloaded to municipal authorities, Highway 10 had continued further south through Brampton and Mississauga running parallel to Highway 410.

The speed limit is 100 km/h (62 mph). The route is patrolled by the Ontario Provincial Police (OPP) and maintained by the Ministry of Transportation of Ontario (MTO).

== Route description ==
Highway 410 starts at a massive stack interchange with Highway 401 and Highway 403. The eastern segment of Highway 403, which runs from the south and west through central Mississauga, splits up into a collector-express system at Eglinton Avenue. While the express lanes continue directly to the Highway 401 express lanes east of the 401-403-410 interchange (just north of the Matheson Boulevard overpass), the collector lanes effectively continue northward as Highway 410 after exit/entry ramps linking to the Highway 401 collector lanes.

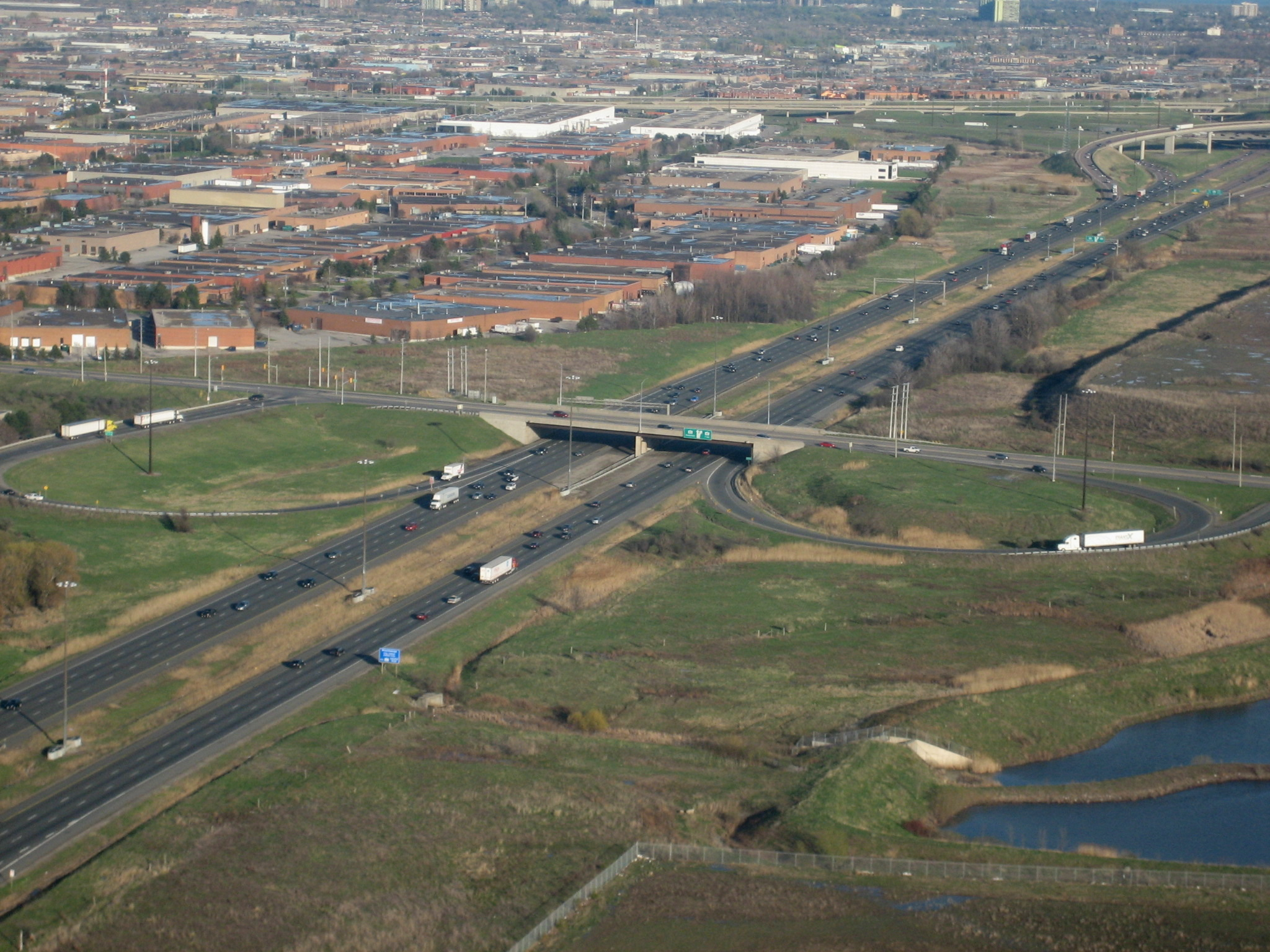
The interchange with Courtney Park Drive looking south, prior to the reconfiguration of the ramps, also showing the freeway's grass median prior to widening.

Maintaining a straight north-westward course, it interchanges with Courtney Park Drive and Derry Road (Peel Regional Road 5), with a slight jog to the right between the two underpasses. North of Derry Road, the freeway meets Highway 407 ETR at a cloverstack interchange as it crosses into Brampton and passes beneath a hydro corridor (power transmission corridor). Veering to the left, the freeway continues through industrialized areas and returns to its northwest–southeast orientation. The highway interchanges with Steeles Avenue (Peel Regional Road 15), following alongside the alignment of Heart Lake Road (now mostly broken up into segments), and later Queen Street, the former Highway 7, now Peel Regional Road 107. Until it was decommissioned across the Greater Toronto Area (GTA), Highway 7 was concurrent between Queen Street and Bovaird Drive (Peel Regional Road 10). Passing north of Queen Street, the highway leaves the industrial area and passes through residential areas in an open cut until an interchange with Bovaird Drive, the highway's former terminus until 2009.

The most recently completed extension begins at this point, as the highway returns to ground level; the highway passes to the west of Trinity Common and departs from the Heart Lake Road alignment passing near the Heart Lake Conservation Area. As it interchanges with Mayfield Road (Peel Regional Road 14), the highway makes a sharp turn to the west and descends through the Etobicoke Creek valley. After passing under Kennedy Road (Peel Regional Road 16) and rising back to level ground, it curves north, passing beneath Valleywood Drive. At this point, the highway encounters the final interchange with Hurontario Street. The central concrete median barrier, along with high-mast lighting, end as the freeway's opposing carriageways merge. The highway becomes Highway 10, which continues north to Orangeville, Shelburne, and eventually Owen Sound.

== History ==
The Highway 401-403-410 interchange looking east in 1987. Before 1990, Highway 410 did not connect with Highway 403, and only existed as a Super two north of Highway 401.

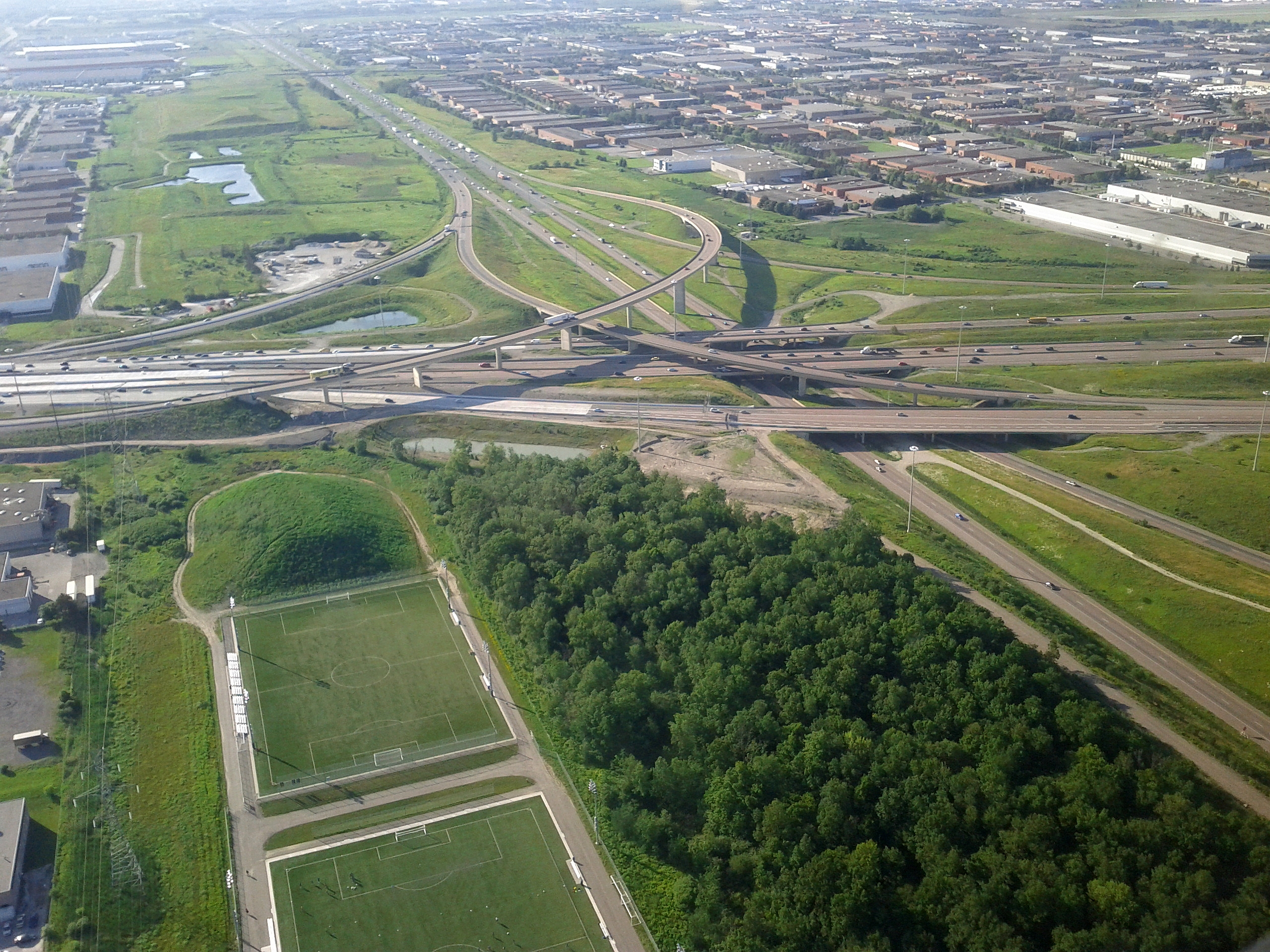
The interchange in 2013, looking north (Highway 401 was being widened west of the interchange), with a directional ramp under construction in the southwest corner. Highway 410 is in its early 1990s configuration with a grass median.

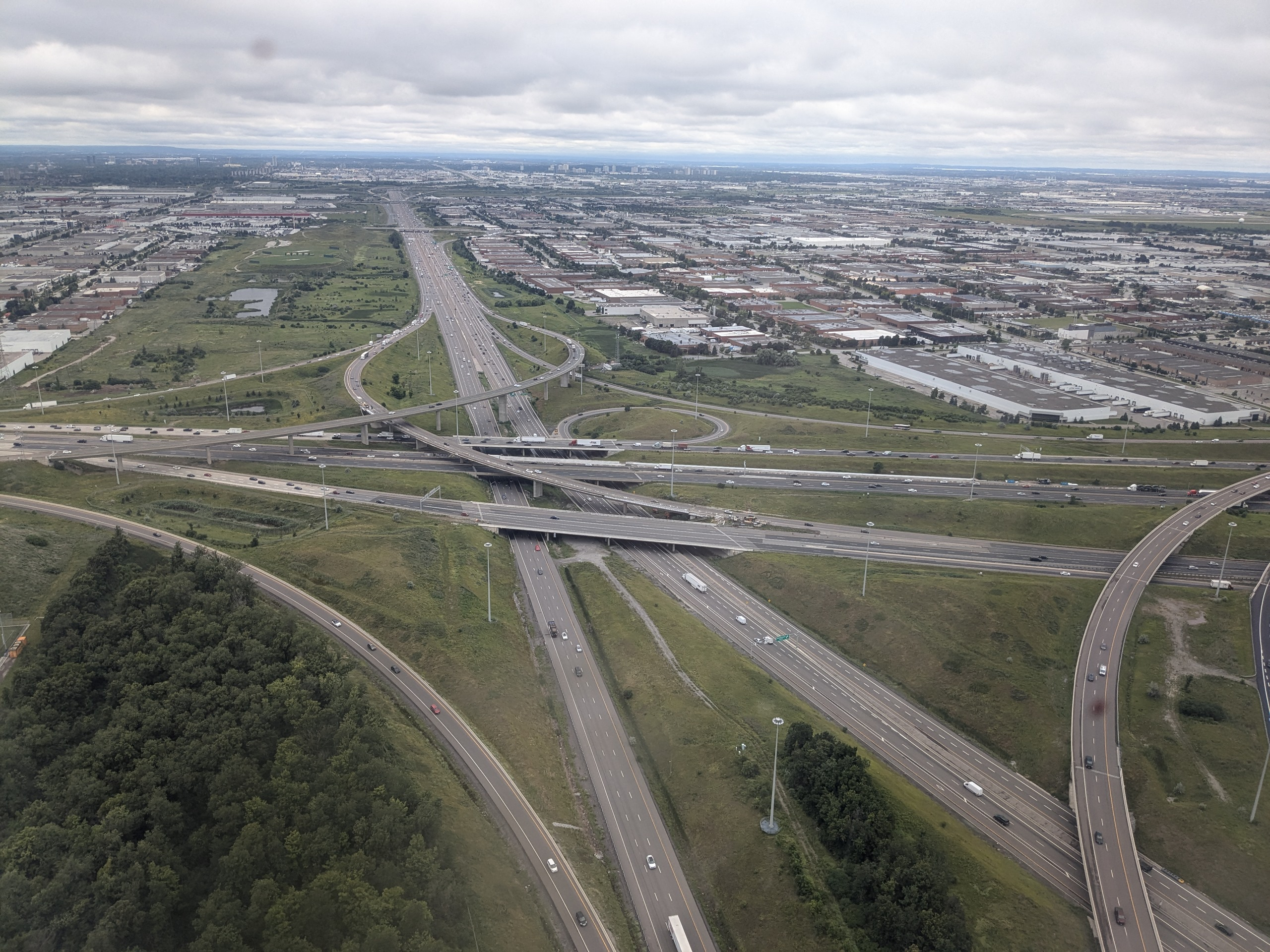
The interchange in 2024, with missing connections completed. Highway 410 has been widened with the addition of HOV lanes, with a concrete barrier replacing the grass median.

Planning for Highway 410 began during the late 1960s as a result of the rapid suburbanization of Brampton. On May 25, 1965, the Department of Highways (DHO) unveiled the Toronto Region Western Section Highway Planning Study. The plan designated several new highway corridors and widening projects through Peel and Halton, including Highway 10. However, it did not include a truck bypass that was desired by Brampton city council. In 1969, then Brampton Mayor William H. Brydon would encourage the DHO to construct this bypass utilizing Heart Lake Road through the city, and announced the plans at his final city council meeting as mayor, claiming that it may be known as the Brampton Expressway and would connect with Highway 401. Successor Jim Archdekin announced in the new year that he would meet with highways minister George Gomme to discuss the route of the bypass. The DHO studied the corridor over the next several months before releasing a report in late August.

Ontario Premier Bill Davis, who was known as "Brampton Billy", formally initiated the construction of Highway 410 along the Heart Lake Road corridor during his administration. Prior to the construction of Highway 410, Heart Lake Road was flanked by the industrial lands of Brampton and Bramalea north of Steeles Avenue, which required the highway to follow the road's alignment to avoid demolition of buildings. Between Steeles and Highway 401 was agricultural lands, allowing for the highway to constructed on a separate alignment to the west. In 1975, construction began on the widening of Highway 401 between Highway 10 (Hurontario Street) and Highway 427 from four to six lanes. On Highway 401 between Kennedy Road and Dixie Road, while the first phase of a large interchange was being built primarily for the upcoming Mississauga segment of Highway 403, ramps were also constructed with the new Brampton freeway to allow access to Highway 401 east of that junction (a directional ramp from Highway 401 westbound and a loop ramp to Highway 401 eastbound). However, the fledgling Brampton highway did not yet have links to Highway 401 west of that junction nor to Highway 403. Heart Lake Road though Brampton was rebuilt over the next several years, and reopened as a two lane expressway on November 15, 1978. It was at this point that the road was designated Highway 410 as far north as Queen Street.

The construction of Highway 410 resulted in changes to the surrounding street network: The intact southern section of Heart Lake Road south of Steeles Avenue was severed from the northern section after the highway largely subsumed the latter. This portion was renamed Tomken Road (as a continuation of a street linked to its southern terminus when a jog was eliminated), and a diversion was constructed by the City of Brampton to connect it with Steeles further east. The West Drive Extension, between Orenda Road and Steeles, was constructed in 1983 to link with the north end of the new diversion.

Construction to twin the highway began in 1983, following the completion of a culvert over the east branch of the Etobicoke Creek; the interchange with Clark Boulevard was built at the same time. The following year, contracts were awarded to build the two structures over the Canadian National Railway south of Orenda Road, as well as an interchange at Queen Street; the former was completed by the end of the year while the latter took until late 1985. Construction of the interchange at Bovaird Drive began in 1985 and was completed the following summer. With the construction of each interchange, the future northbound lanes of the freeway were constructed and opened to two-way traffic. By 1988, two lanes were open between Steeles Avenue and Bovaird Drive.

In 1987, construction began south of the future Highway 407 interchange, expanding the two lane Heart Lake Road to a six lane freeway. In addition, work began on the future southbound lanes north of Steeles Avenue. In 1990, the Courtney Park Drive overpass was widened from two to four lanes as ramps were added to connect to the freeway south of it. By mid-1991, Highway 410 was complete from north of Highway 401 to Bovaird Drive, and work was underway to complete the junction, with an eleven-span semi-directional flyover ramp from Highway 401 eastbound to Highway 410 northbound, while the flyover ramp from Highway 410 southbound to Highway 401 eastbound replaced the existing loop ramp. The interchange with Highway 401 was expanded alongside the widening of that highway to a collector-express system and opened to traffic ramp-by-ramp beginning August 28, 1990 and continuing through the end of the year.

In the fall of 1991, alongside the widening of Highway 410 into a full freeway, construction began on the connecting ramps between Highway 403 and Highway 410 that pass under the existing Highway 401 collector lane structures within the space vacated by the removal of the Highway 410 southbound to Highway 401 eastbound loop ramp. In the vacant right-of-way between the Highway 401 collectors, overpasses were constructed for the Highway 401 express lanes that would flow under the recently completed flyover ramps between Highway 401 eastbound and Highway 410. The 2.2-kilometre (1.4 mi) link opened on November 2, 1992, at a cost of $7.3 million.

As completed to its initial terminus in mid-1991, Highway 410 ended just north of the interchange with Bovaird Drive, as the opposing carriageways merged under the western span of the Bovaird Drive overpass (although separated by a Jersey barrier for some distance) and after an S-curve the freeway transitioned to an arterial street and continued north as Heart Lake Road.

=== Extension ===
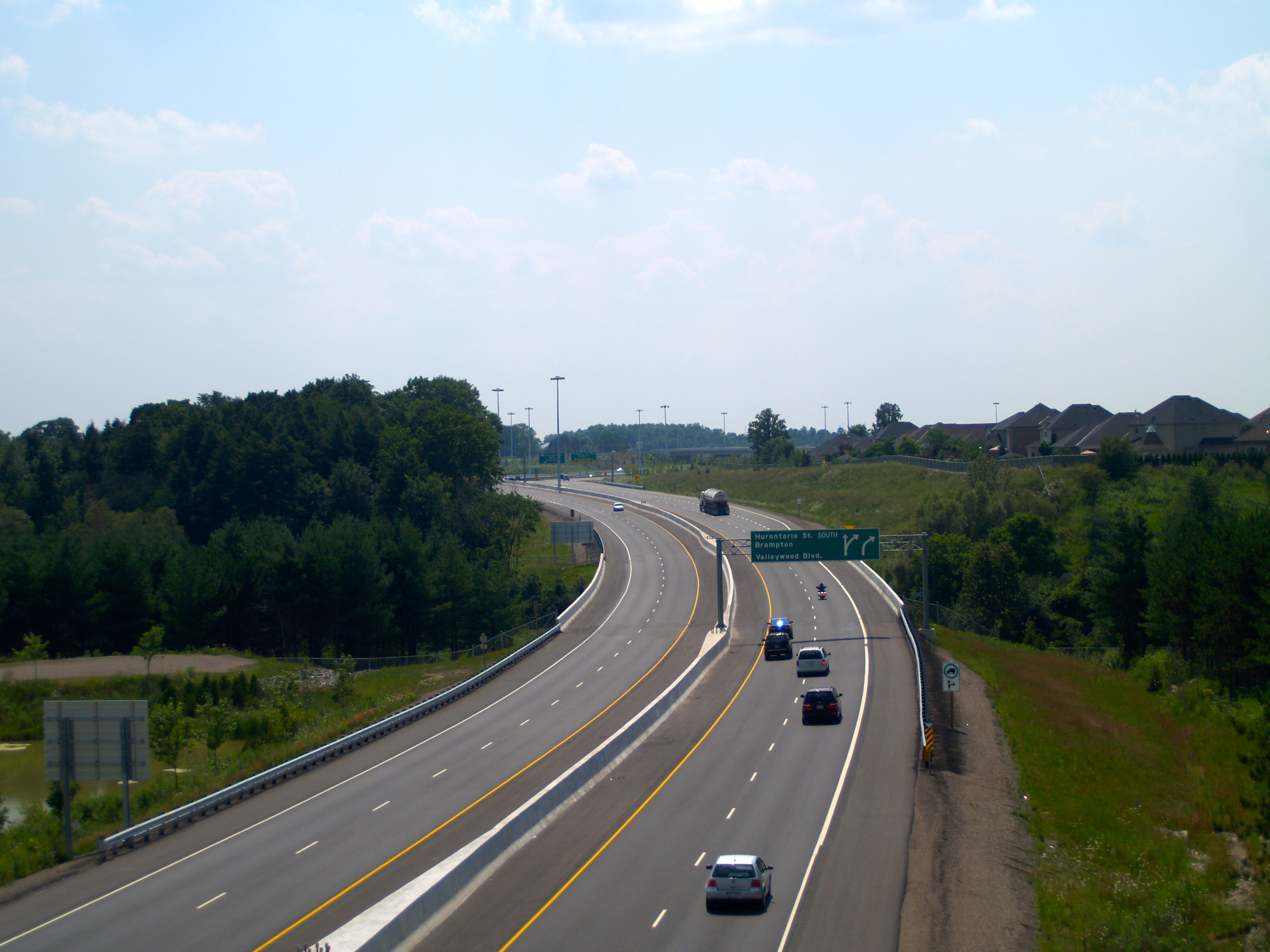
The new 410 extension crossing Etobicoke Creek. Note the placeholders for high-mast lighting on the median.

The extension beyond Bovaird Drive to Hurontario Street was conceived as part of the ultimate plan for Highway 410 when it was under construction in 1982. It would take until 2003 for construction to begin. Planning for the 8.5-kilometre (5.3 mi) freeway began with the submitting of an Environmental Assessment by the Ministry of Transportation of Ontario (MTO) in October 1995. The assessment was approved without a hearing by the Minister of Environment and Energy on March 5, 1997. The next several years were spent on engineering and design. The new section, planned and built as a four lane freeway, was constructed on a new alignment in order to bypass the Heart Lake Conservation Area. It was completed in phases: initially to the new eastward extension of Sandalwood Parkway, later to Mayfield Road and finally to Highway 10 north of Sandalwood.

Premier of Ontario Ernie Eves officially announced the extension on June 23, 2003; construction subsequently began on the first phase. Heart Lake Road, which had transitioned directly into the existing freeway since mid-1991, was realigned to a new intersection west of Bovaird Drive's interchange with the freeway, so this would allow the ramps between Bovaird Drive and the freeway extension to be built. On May 15, 2006, construction began on the second phase between Sandalwood Parkway and Mayfield Drive. The first two phases were built by Dufferin Construction and opened together in mid–late 2007; the northbound lanes were opened by the beginning of September and the southbound lanes by the end of the month. Upon its opening, trucks were prohibited from driving along it due to concerns of them travelling on the two lane Mayfield Road; this ban has since been lifted.

Construction on the third phase between Mayfield Road and Highway 10 began in August 2007. This resulted in Hurontario Street becoming discontinuous as it was split into two segments, with the northern end of the southern portion realigned so it defaults to Valleywood Boulevard (which leads to a new residential community), with a new interchange connecting to the freeway extension that soon transitions into the northern portion of Hurontario Street (which also assumes the provincial Highway 10 designation) as it crosses into Caledon. The freeway extension was completed and opened to traffic on November 16, 2009, directly connecting Highway 410 and Highway 10 for the first time (prior to provincial downloading in 1997, the Highway 10 routing ran further south along Hurontario where it was parallel to Highway 410 in Brampton and Mississauga). Additional work continued in the months that followed to clean up the land surrounding the new freeway. The bypassed portion of Hurontario Street, that connected the northern and southern segments and included a temporary diversion to facilitate the construction, was later retained while being renamed Hutchinson Farm Lane and made accessible via a new intersection from the southern segment of Hurontario Street.

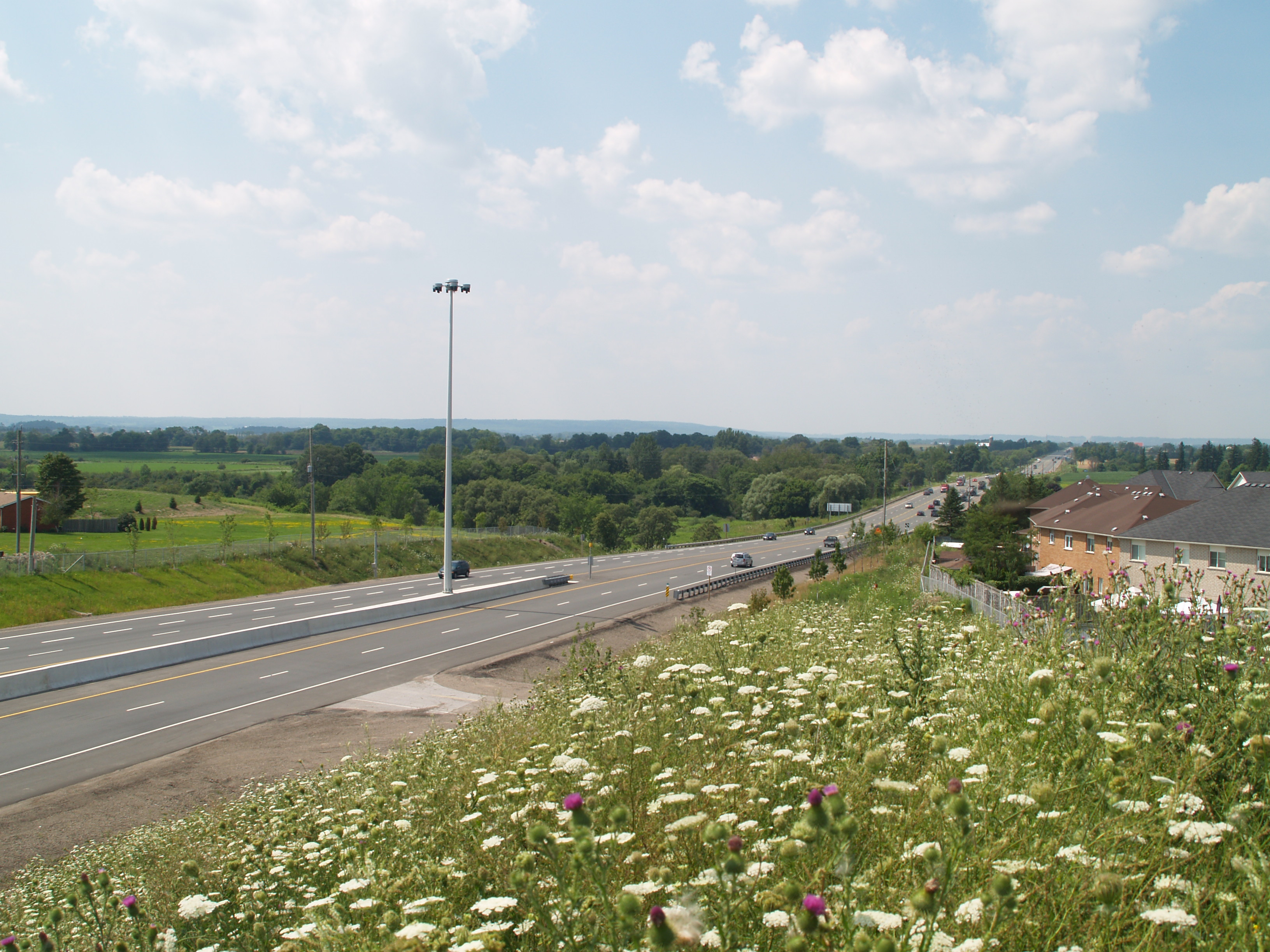
Highway 410 ends as Highway 10 begins.

=== Widening with HOV lanes ===
On September 9, 2014, the MTO announced that Highway 410 would be widened to ten lanes from south of Highway 401 to Queen Street in Brampton by 2018. A C$156.7 million contract was awarded to Aecon Construction to expand the freeway by adding one general purpose and one High-occupancy vehicle (HOV) lane in each direction. A northbound collector lane will also be implemented between the Highway 401 on-ramps and the realigned off-ramp to Courtneypark Drive. In addition, two new ramps will be built at the partial interchange with Highway 401 and Highway 403, a directional ramp from Highway 401 eastbound to Highway 403 southbound and a loop ramp from Highway 403 northbound to Highway 401 westbound, thereby providing access to and from all directions. One new lane in each direction was opened in late 2017: a northbound lane between Courtney Park and south of Queen Street on October 31, and a southbound lane between Queen Street and Highway 401 on November 28. In November 2018, both the southbound and northbound HOV Lane opened through the route. The southbound HOV was opened several weeks ahead of the northbound HOV lane.

As a result of a study in 2018, the Courtneypark Drive partial-access interchange was expanded into a full interchange (Parclo A2) in 2020. The overpass was widened and ramps were being added to provide access to and from the section of Highway 410 north of that junction, which required the implementation of a short southbound collector lane between Derry Road and Courtneypark Drive due to the close proximity of these interchanges.

== Future ==
The 4-kilometre (2.5 mi) segment of the freeway between Mayfield Road and Highway 10 that opened on November 16, 2009 would be bypassed by a new extension that would meet the proposed Highway 413 at a freeway-to-freeway interchange.

On April 30, 2024, the Ontario provincial government confirmed it will start constructing Highway 413 in 2025 after coming to an agreement with the Canadian federal government. Highway 413 would be the proposed northern terminus of Highway 410.

In September 2026, the provincial government awarded a contract to manage the construction of the Highway 410 extension.

== Exit list ==
The following table lists the major junctions along Highway 410, as noted by the Ministry of Transportation of Ontario. The entire route is located in the Regional Municipality of Peel.

Location	km	mi	Exit	Destinations	Notes
Mississauga	0.0– 1.3	0.0– 0.81	—	Highway 403 west – Hamilton Highway 401 – London, Toronto	Highway 410 southern terminus of highway; 410 does not officially reach Highway 403, but connects via de facto through-lanes south of Highway 401; access to Toronto Pearson International Airport; Highway 401 exit 344
Mississauga	3.2	2.0	2	Courtneypark Drive	Former partial interchange; converted into a full interchange in 2022; signed as Courtneypark Drive East
Mississauga	4.6	2.9	3	Regional Road 5 (Derry Road)	
Brampton	5.8	3.6	5	407 ETR	No access to Courtneypark Drive from southbound entrance; Highway 407 exit 46
Brampton	7.9	4.9	7	Regional Road 15 (Steeles Avenue)	
Brampton	10.4	6.5	9	Clark Boulevard	Northbound exit and southbound entrance
Brampton	11.0	6.8	10	Queen Street (Regional Road 107 east / Regional Road 6 west)	Formerly Highway 7 east; south end of former Highway 7 concurrency; Regional Road 6 unsigned
Brampton	12.5	7.8	12	Williams Parkway	
Brampton	14.0	8.7	13	Bovaird Drive (Regional Road 10 east / Regional Road 107 west)	Formerly Highway 7 west; north end of former Highway 7 concurrency; Regional Roads unsigned; to Brampton Civic Hospital
Brampton	15.9	9.9	15	Sandalwood Parkway	
Brampton–Caledon boundary	18.6	11.6	18	Mayfield Road (Regional Road 14)	
Brampton–Caledon boundary	18.6	11.6		To Highway 413	Proposed Highway 410 realignment and 4 km extension to Highway 413
Caledon	21.8– 22.2	13.5– 13.8	21	Hurontario Street south / Valleywood Boulevard – Brampton	Former Highway 10 south
Caledon	21.8– 22.2	13.5– 13.8	—	Highway 10 north (Hurontario Street) – Orangeville	Highway 410 northern terminus; continues as Highway 10
1.000 mi = 1.609 km; 1.000 km = 0.621 mi: Incomplete access; Proposed; Tolled; Route transition
