= Southern Ontario =

Primary region of Ontario, Canada

- Primary region
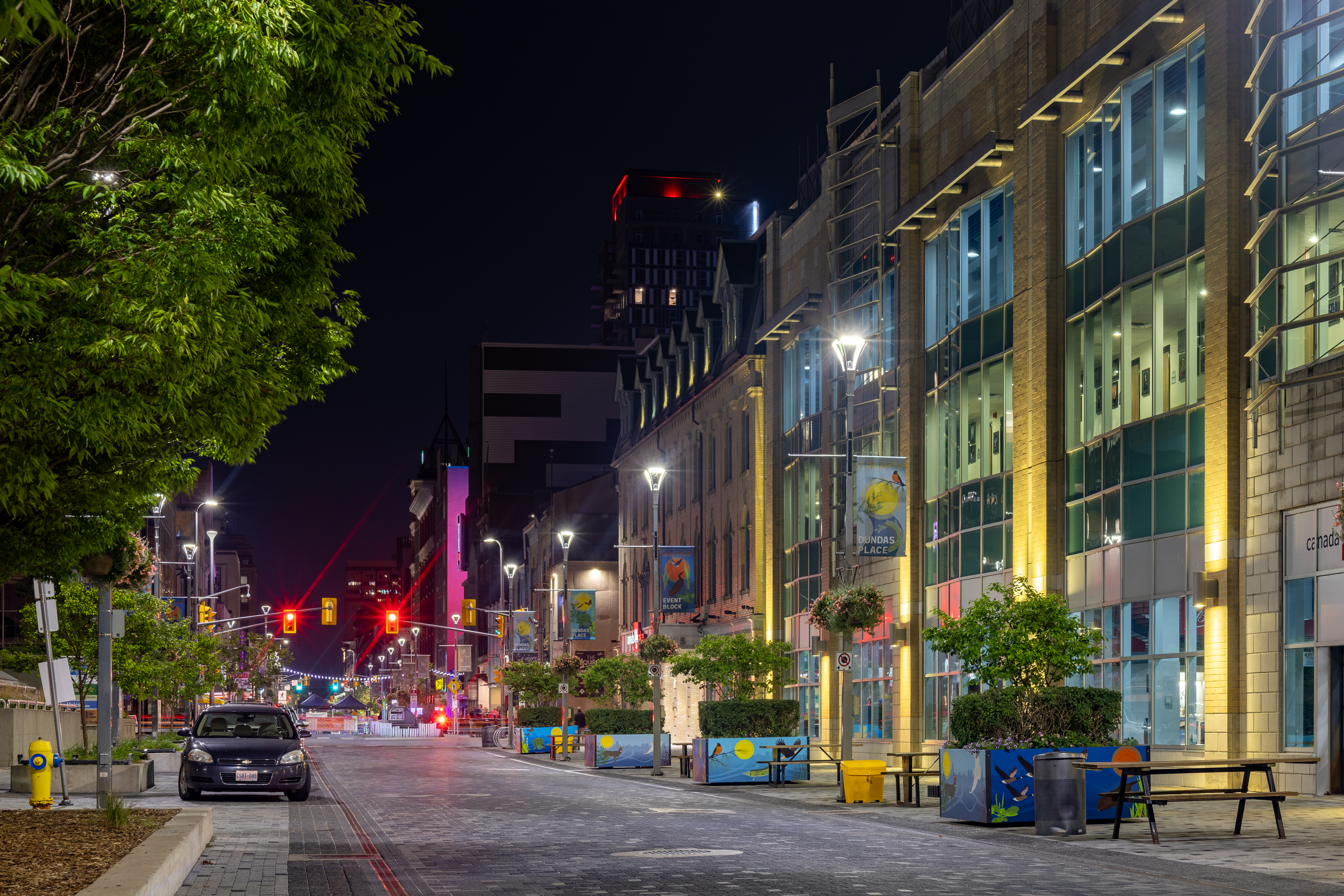
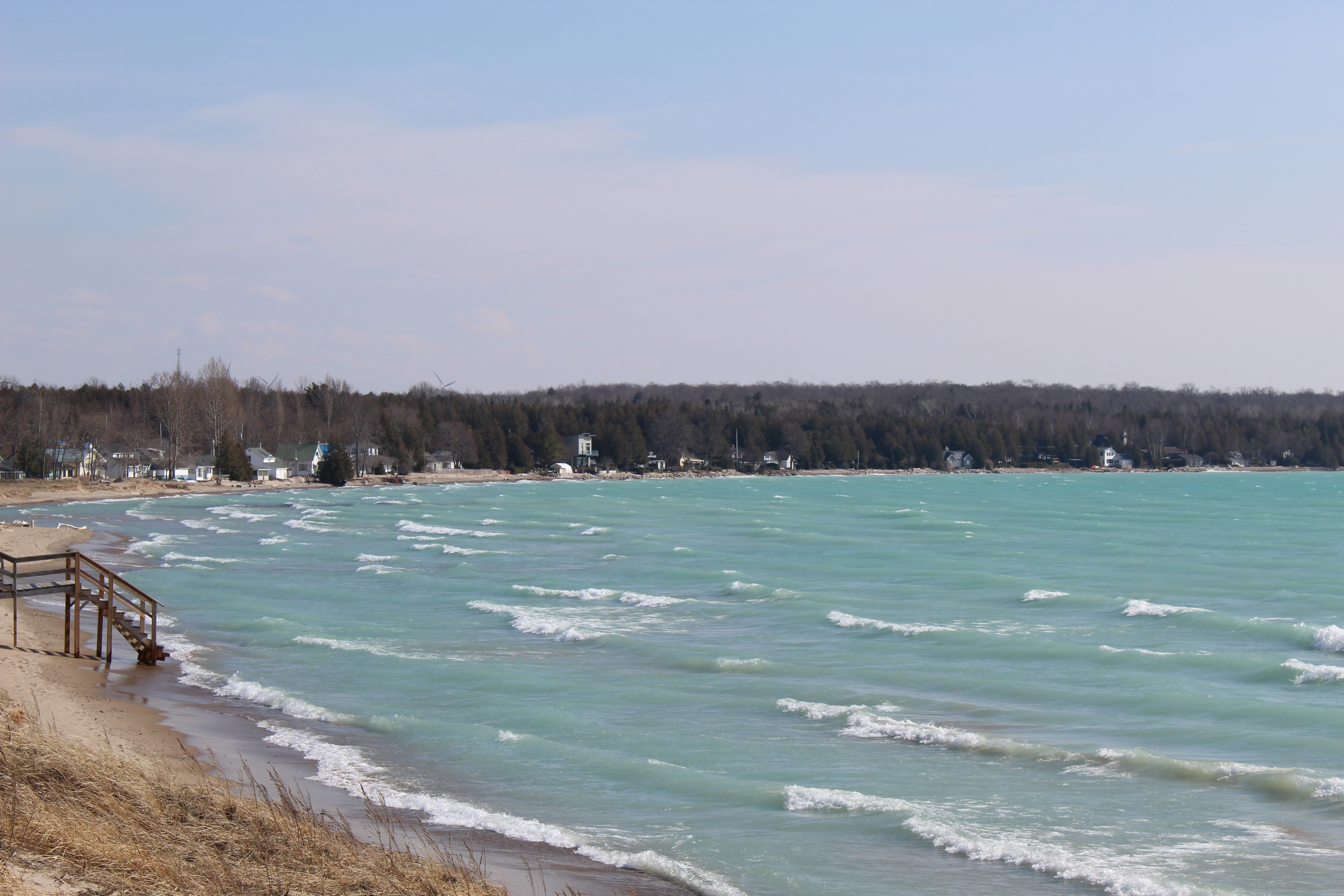
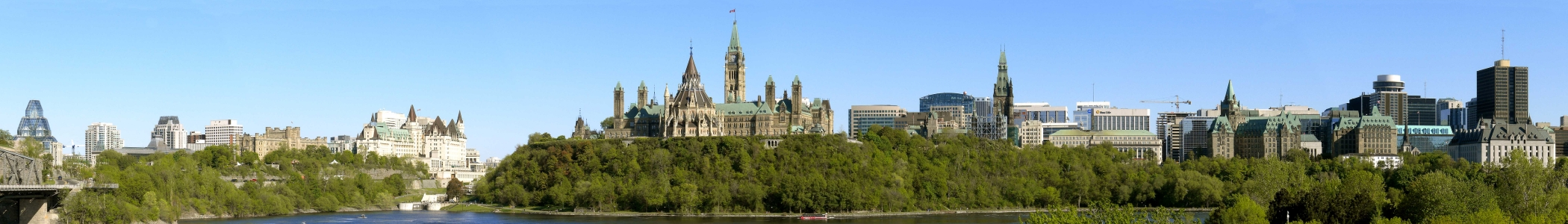
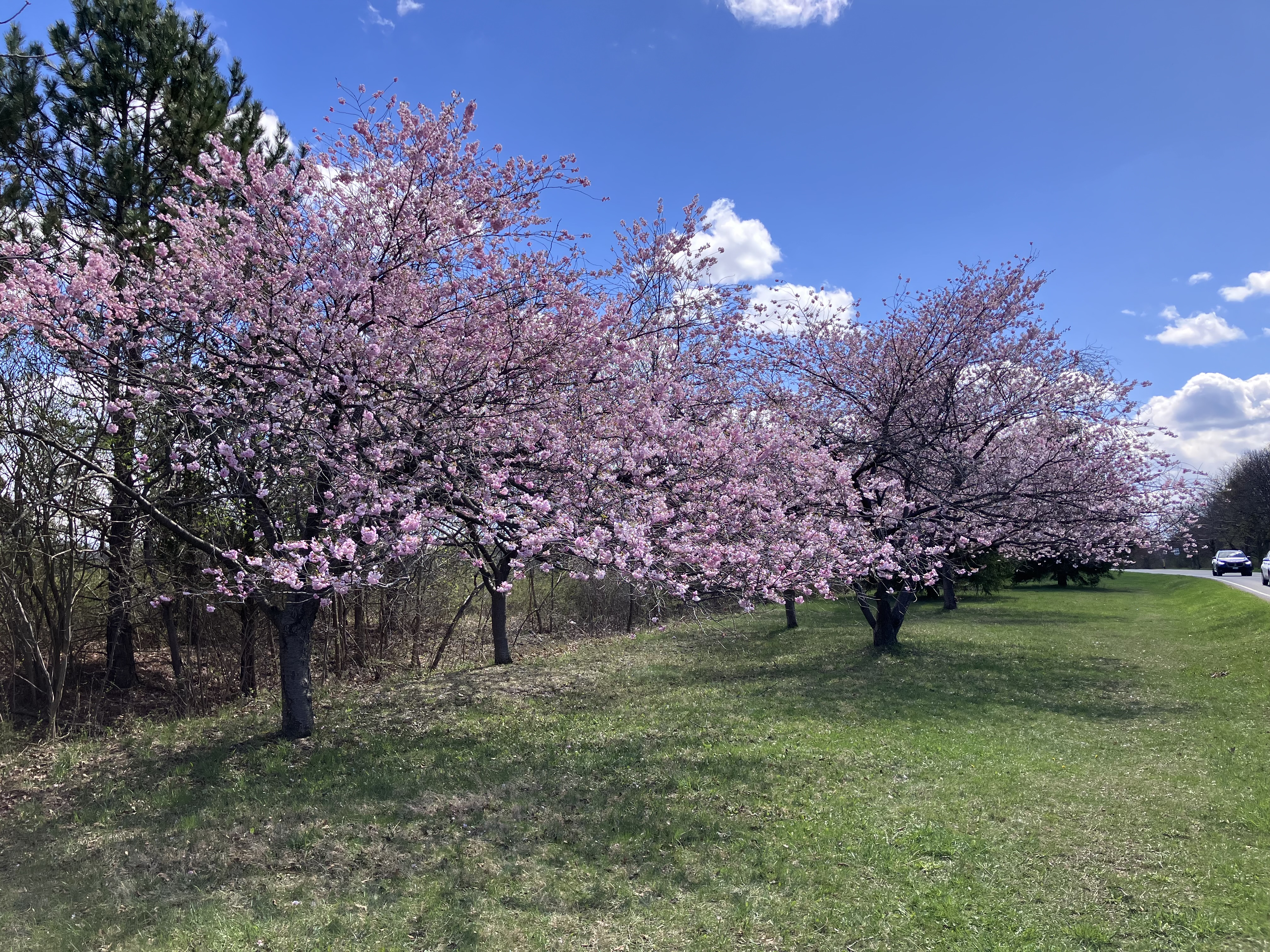
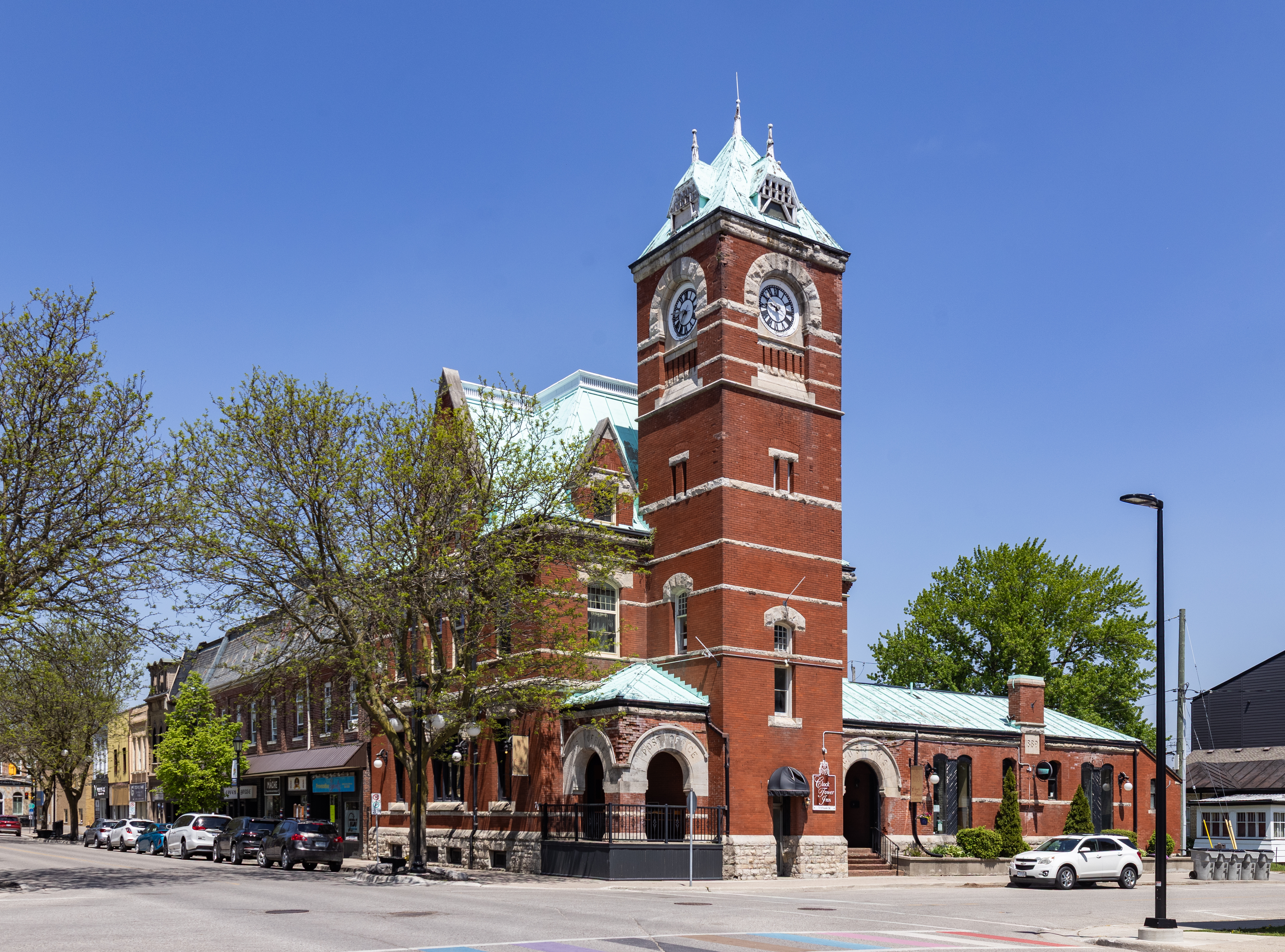
- From top to bottom, left to right: London, Bruce County, Toronto, Ottawa, Niagara Parkway, Middlesex County

- ██ Core area ██ Extended area
- Coordinates: 44°00′N 80°00′W
- Country: Canada
- Province: Ontario

Area
  - Primary region: 114,217 km^{2} (44,099 sq mi)
  - Core area: 101,264 km^{2} (39,098 sq mi)
  - Extended area: 12,953 km^{2} (5,001 sq mi)

Population (2021)
  - Primary region: 13,481,332
  - Density: 118/km^{2} (310/sq mi)
  - Rural: 2,500,000
  - Core area: 13,367,749
  - Extended area: 113,583
- Demonym: Southern Ontarian

GDP
  - Total: $1.03 trillion
- Time zone: UTC−05:00 (EST)
  - Summer (DST): UTC−04:00 (EDT)
- Postal code prefixes: K, L, M, N
- Area codes: 226, 249, 289, 343, 365, 416, 437, 519, 548, 613, 647, 705, 905

Southern Ontario is a primary region of the Canadian province of Ontario. It is the most densely populated and southernmost region in Canada, with approximately 14.7 million people or about 36% of Canada's population of 41 million.

The region lies south of the province's other primary region, Northern Ontario, although the exact northern boundary of Southern Ontario is disputed. However, its core region is situated south of Algonquin Park, the latter being in an area of transition between coniferous forest north of the French and Mattawa Rivers and southern deciduous forest. It covers between 14 and 15% of the province, depending on the inclusion of the Parry Sound and Muskoka districts which also lie in the transitional area between northern and southern forest regions. Southern Ontario differs greatly from Northern Ontario, having a much higher population density, a different climate, and a different culture than its northern counterpart. It is broken into smaller subregions, including Central Ontario, Eastern Ontario, the Golden Horseshoe, and Southwestern Ontario.

The core area of Southern Ontario is part of the Quebec City–Windsor Corridor, which extends northeast into southern Quebec. The transitional northern area of this primary region extends north to the Mattawa River and occupies part of the Grenville Geological Province of the Canadian Shield, which also extends northeast into southern Quebec; most of Northern Ontario lies within the Superior Geological Province.

== Identity ==
Northern Ontario contains more natural resources, remote wilderness, and has a saltwater coastline on Hudson and James Bays, and Southern Ontario is more densely populated, contains most of the province's cities, major roads, and institutions; has an abundance of freshwater coastlines on three Great Lakes (Huron, Erie and Ontario), as well as smaller lakes such as Lake Simcoe and Lake St. Clair; and is a major vineyard region and producer of Canadian wines. Southern Ontario further distinguishes itself by referring to the southern-most portion of the province as Southwestern Ontario.

While Southern Ontario has been a part of the province of Ontario since its establishment at Confederation in 1867, previously forming the colony of Upper Canada, a large portion of Northern Ontario did not become part of Ontario until 1912.

== History ==
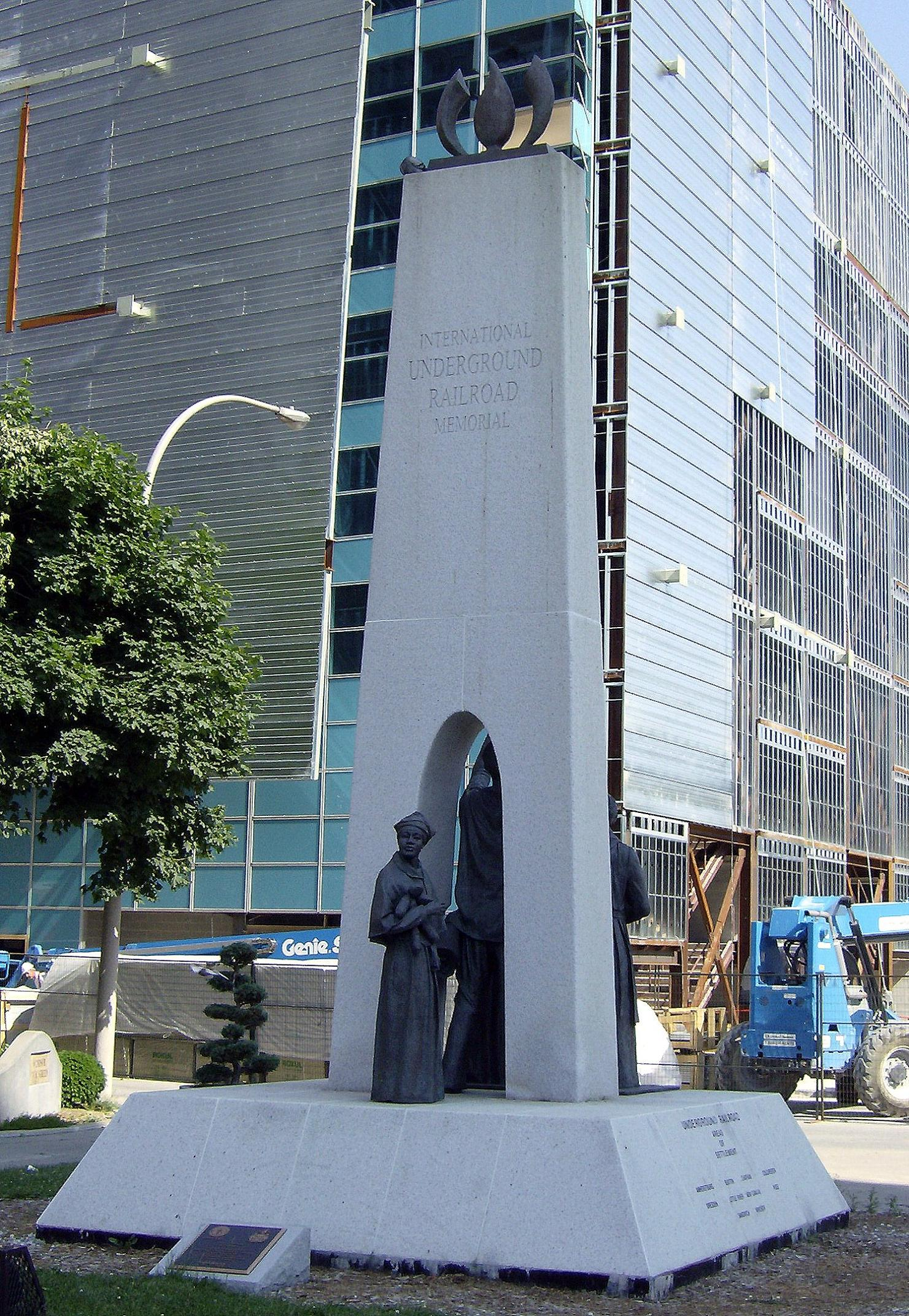
Underground Railroad monument, Windsor

The French explored and colonized Territorial Southern Ontario in the 17th century and forged relations within the Huronia region with the Wendat people based around the Georgian Bay/Lake Simcoe area. Other Iroquoian-speaking people to the south were the Petun and Neutral Nation, and further northeast in Anishinaabewaki, Algonquins inhabited the upper Ottawa River/Madawaska Valley areas and the Mississaugas moved south from northern Lake Huron, settling lands in both the Kawartha region and just west of Toronto.

Following the Seven Years' War, the British wrested control of Southern Ontario, and more significant colonization efforts were spurred on by the arrival of United Empire Loyalists brought on by the American Revolution.

Southern Ontario was where a large portion of the battles took place during the War of 1812, and was a major destination for escaping slaves using the Underground Railroad.

Following the enactment of Prohibition in the United States in 1919, Southern Ontario immediately became a hotbed of smuggling alcohol (spirit) across the border.

== Demographics ==
Southern Ontario is home to over 94%, or 12.1 million, of Ontario's total population of 12.9 million (and about 35% of Canada's total population), compared to approximately 750,000 in Northern Ontario. This is due to many factors, including the more arable land in the south, its more moderate climate, well-used transportation (water, land, and air) routes, as well as a long history of early European settlers and colonialism.

For thousands of years, Ontario has been home to indigenous aboriginal communities, with numerous nations with differing languages at the time of European contact. Over 200,000 aboriginal Canadians live in Southern Ontario today.

Southern Ontario was colonized by the French and the British. After the area began to be developed for European settlement, especially after the American Revolutionary War, other European immigrants arrived as well, with increased immigration in the late 19th and early 20th centuries. Since the late 20th century, many immigrants have come from Asia and other parts of the world. The region is one of the top destinations for immigrants worldwide, particularly the Greater Toronto Area.

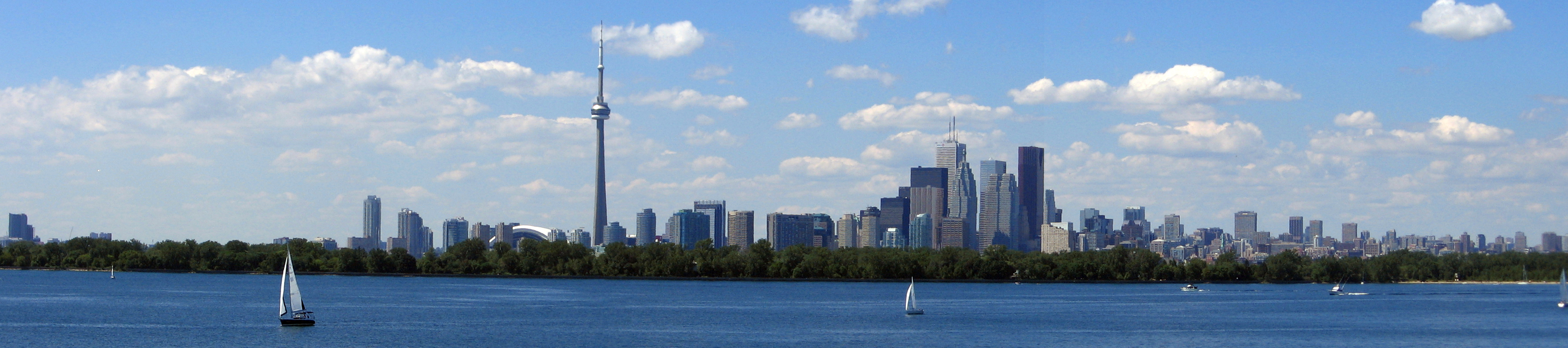
Toronto skyline in 2005

== Sports ==
These are the sports teams of Southern Ontario:

- NBA (Basketball) Toronto Raptors
- MLB (Baseball) Toronto Blue Jays
- NHL (Ice hockey) Toronto Maple Leafs, Ottawa Senators
- AHL (Ice hockey) Toronto Marlies, Hamilton Hammers, Belleville Senators
- MLS (Soccer) Toronto FC
- CPL (Soccer) Inter Toronto, Hamilton Forge, Atlético Ottawa
- CFL (Canadian Football) Toronto Argonauts, Hamilton Tiger-Cats Ottawa Redblacks
- WNBA (Basketball) Toronto Tempo
- PWHL (Ice hockey) Toronto Sceptres, Ottawa Charge, Hamilton Havoc
- NSL (Soccer) AFC Toronto, Ottawa Rapid FC

== Economy ==
The area has a large manufacturing sector. Since the mid-2000s, Ontario has produced more vehicles per year than the state of Michigan. In a cross-border definition, a swath of Southern Ontario could be considered a part of the Rust Belt. Factory closings because of industry restructuring and globalization (corresponding movement of jobs overseas and to non-unionized labour markets in the United States) have for the past few decades taken their toll. This is most evident in the region's southern tier cities, which have large automobile or associated industrial bases, such as Windsor, London, St. Thomas and St. Catharines. Still affected by these factors, but to a lesser extent, is Hamilton, the centre of steel production, and Sarnia, the centre of petrochemical production. The province's two largest cities, Toronto and Ottawa, have moved increasingly to a service and knowledge economy. Toronto is home to the country's financial sector, including the major Canadian banks and Toronto Stock Exchange. Ottawa, the national capital, is home to the Government of Canada and most government departments and agencies, in addition to having a strong technology sector.

Some parts of Southern Ontario are heavily entwined with bordering cities in New York and Michigan in terms of industry and people. The focus areas are the Buffalo–Niagara, Sarnia and Detroit–Windsor. Many people work and live on opposite sides of the border. The NEXUS program for frequent travelers across the border is increasing in popularity among bordering communities. Other areas with heavy trade traffic with Southern Ontario include Montreal and the province of Quebec, parts of northern Ohio, and western Pennsylvania.

Most of the province's agriculture is found here. That includes most of Ontario's berry growers, who are represented by Ontario Berries.

== Tourism ==
Southern Ontario is well known for its attractions and tourism. Some popular tourist attractions include the CN Tower, Parliament Hill, Niagara Falls, National Gallery of Canada, Canada's Wonderland, CNE, Caesars Windsor, Canadian War Museum, Toronto Zoo, Hockey Hall of Fame, Ripley's Aquarium of Canada, Royal Canadian Mint, The Rideau Canal, Canadian Warplane Heritage Museum, the Canadian Museum of History and the Royal Ontario Museum.

Niagara Falls is the 6th most visited attraction by domestic and international tourists worldwide, with over 14 million tourists annually. In 2006, Toronto was the 14th most visited city by international tourists in the world, with over 4.1 million visitors in the year. Ottawa is the most visited city in Canada by domestic tourists, hosting over 6.9 million Canadian visitors per year.

Southern Ontario is home to several professional sports teams, including the Ottawa Senators and Toronto Maple Leafs in the NHL; the Toronto Blue Jays in Major League Baseball; the NBA's Toronto Raptors; soccer's Toronto FC in MLS and Atlético Ottawa in the Canadian Premier League; and three teams in the Canadian Football League—the Hamilton Tiger-Cats, Ottawa Redblacks, and Toronto Argonauts. The region also hosts the Canadian Open in golf and Rogers Cup in tennis. (Note: "Rogers Cup" is the current sponsored name. The men's version, held in Toronto in even-numbered years, is generically known as the Canada Masters, and the women's version, held in Toronto in odd-numbered years, is generically known as the Canadian Open.)

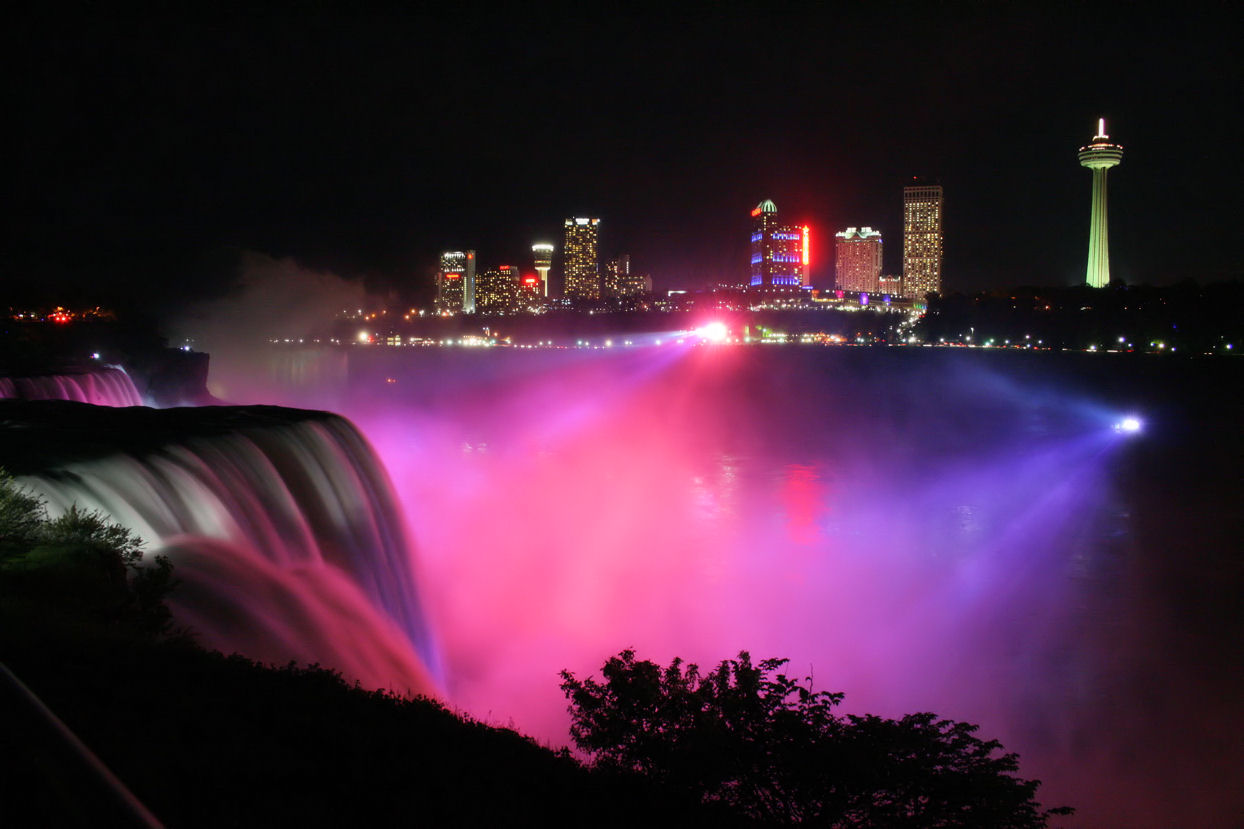
Niagara Falls in 2009

The area sponsors many internationally renowned festivals and events, including Toronto International Film Festival, Winterlude, Caribana, Bluesfest, Pride Week, Kitchener Oktoberfest, Havelock Jamboree, Toronto Indy, Sarnia Bayfest, Canada Day in Ottawa, International Freedom Festival in Windsor, Stratford Festival, Shaw Festival and Virgin Festival.

Several large legal gambling establishments have been built throughout the Province, with Caesars Windsor and Fallsview Casino being the two flagship casinos. In addition to casinos, Ontario has many legal horseracing facilities with slot machines. Racetrack slots are located throughout the Province. All gaming in the Province is overseen by the Ontario Lottery and Gaming Corporation (OLG), and the Alcohol and Gaming Commission of Ontario.

Southern Ontario has many natural attractions. Wasaga Beach, Grand Bend, Sauble Beach, and Sandbanks are beaches along the Great Lakes. The Niagara Escarpment offers hiking, skiing, and hundreds of waterfalls, including Niagara Falls. The Ottawa River has white-water rafting which attracts rafters and kayakers from all over the world. Ontario Parks governs all provincial parks, and Parks Canada governs all national parks.

== Cities ==
Southern Ontario is home to both Canada's capital city (Ottawa), and Canada's largest city (Toronto).

Southern Ontario communities have 13 telephone area codes: 226, 249, 289, 343, 365, 382, 416, 437, 519, 548, 613, 647, 705, and 905.

Statistics Canada's measure of a "metro area", the Census Metropolitan Area (CMA), roughly bundles together population figures from the core municipality with those from "commuter" municipalities. Note: A city's metropolitan area may actually be larger than its CMA. For example; Oshawa is part of the Greater Toronto Area; however, it is considered its own CMA.

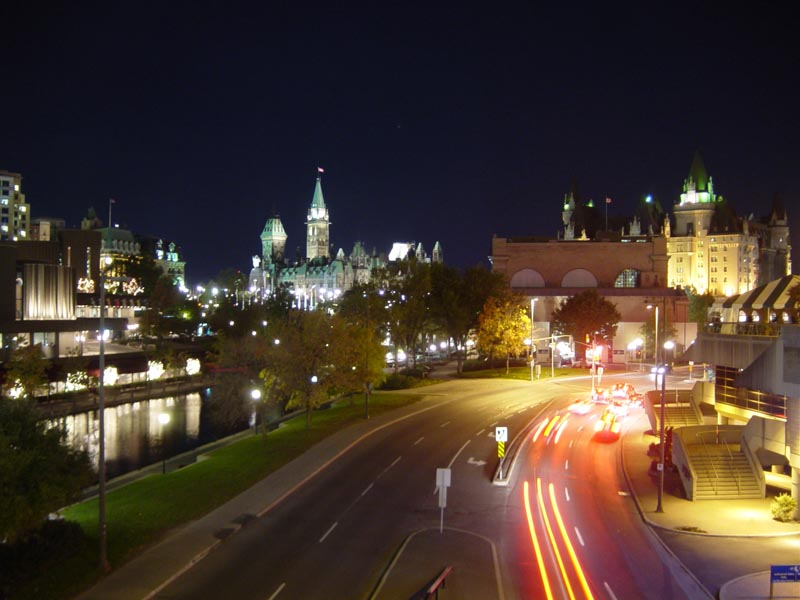
Ottawa in 2005

Southern Ontario Cities †	2021	2016	2011	2006	2001
Toronto CMA	6,202,225	5,928,040	5,583,064	5,113,149	4,682,897
Ottawa CMA	1,488,307	1,323,783	1,236,324	1,130,761	1,067,800
Hamilton CMA	785,184	747,545	721,053	692,911	662,401
Kitchener–Cambridge–Waterloo CMA	575,847	523,894	477,160	451,235	414,284
London CMA	543,551	494,069	474,786	457,720	435,600
St. Catharines–Niagara CMA	433,604	406,074	392,184	390,317	377,009
Windsor CMA	422,630	398,718	319,246	323,342	307,877
Oshawa CMA	415,311	379,848	356,177	330,594	296,298
Barrie CMA	212,856	197,059	187,013	177,061	148,480
Kingston CMA	172,546	161,175	159,561	152,358	146,838
Guelph CMA	165,588	151,984	141,097	127,009	117,344
Brantford CMA	144,162	134,203	135,501	124,607	118,086
Peterborough CMA	128,624	121,721	118,975	116,570	110,876

== Census divisions ==
The region is broken up into 40 census divisions, including 22 counties, eight regional municipalities, nine single-tier municipalities and depending on its inclusion, one district. The line between the counties and regions of the south and the districts of the north can be considered a boundary between Southern and Northern Ontario.

This is disputed, however, as the demarcation line that is referenced in provincial documents is the Nipissing Passageway, originally an Indian trail between Georgian Bay and the Ottawa River. The trail follows the French River from Georgian Bay to Lake Nipissing. At North Bay, 2 kilometres (1.2 mi) of land separates Lake Nipissing from Trout Lake. From Trout Lake, the trail follows the Mattawa River to the Ottawa River.

- Brant (144,771)
- Bruce (73,396)
- Chatham–Kent (104,316)
- Dufferin (66,257)
- Durham (696,992)
- Elgin (94,752)
- Essex (422,860)
- Frontenac (161,780)
- Grey (100,905)
- Haldimand-Norfolk (116,872)
- Haliburton (20,571)
- Halton (596,637)
- Hamilton (569,353)
- Hastings (145,746)
- Huron (61,366)
- Kawartha Lakes (79,247)
- Lambton (128,154)
- Lanark (75,760)
- Leeds & Grenville (104,070)
- Lennox & Addington (45,182)
- Middlesex (500,563)
- Muskoka^{1} (66,674)
- Niagara (477,941)
- Northumberland (89,365)
- Ottawa (1,017,449)
- Oxford (121,781)
- Parry Sound^{1} (46,909)
- Peel (1,451,022)
- Perth (81,565)
- Peterborough (147,681)
- Prescott and Russell (95,639)
- Prince Edward (25,704)
- Renfrew (102,394)
- Simcoe (533,169)
- Stormont, Dundas and Glengarry (114,637)
- Toronto (2,794,356)
- Waterloo (587,165)
- Wellington (241,026)
- York (1,173,334)

^{1} Muskoka and Parry Sound are commonly regarded as transitional regions between Southern and Northern Ontario. Both divisions may be regarded as northern districts geographically, culturally, and politically in some contexts.

The 2011 census revealed that the major urban divisions of York, Halton, Peel, and Ottawa had the largest growth. While the heavy industrial divisions of Chatham, Lambton, and Essex, as well as the mostly recreational divisions of Huron and Prince Edward had a decrease in population.

== Higher education ==
Southern Ontario has long been an international destination for higher learning. It houses numerous internationally acclaimed public universities and colleges amongst its 13 universities and 20 colleges. It is also home to numerous private post-secondary institutions.

== Culture ==
Many notable Canadians have been based in Southern Ontario, as it is Canada's most populated area. Toronto is notable for its multiculturalism and cosmopolitan nature: Southern Ontario also features in the literary genre of Southern Ontario Gothic, a major strand in Canadian literature.

== Transportation ==
Highway 401 at the Don Valley Parkway in Toronto

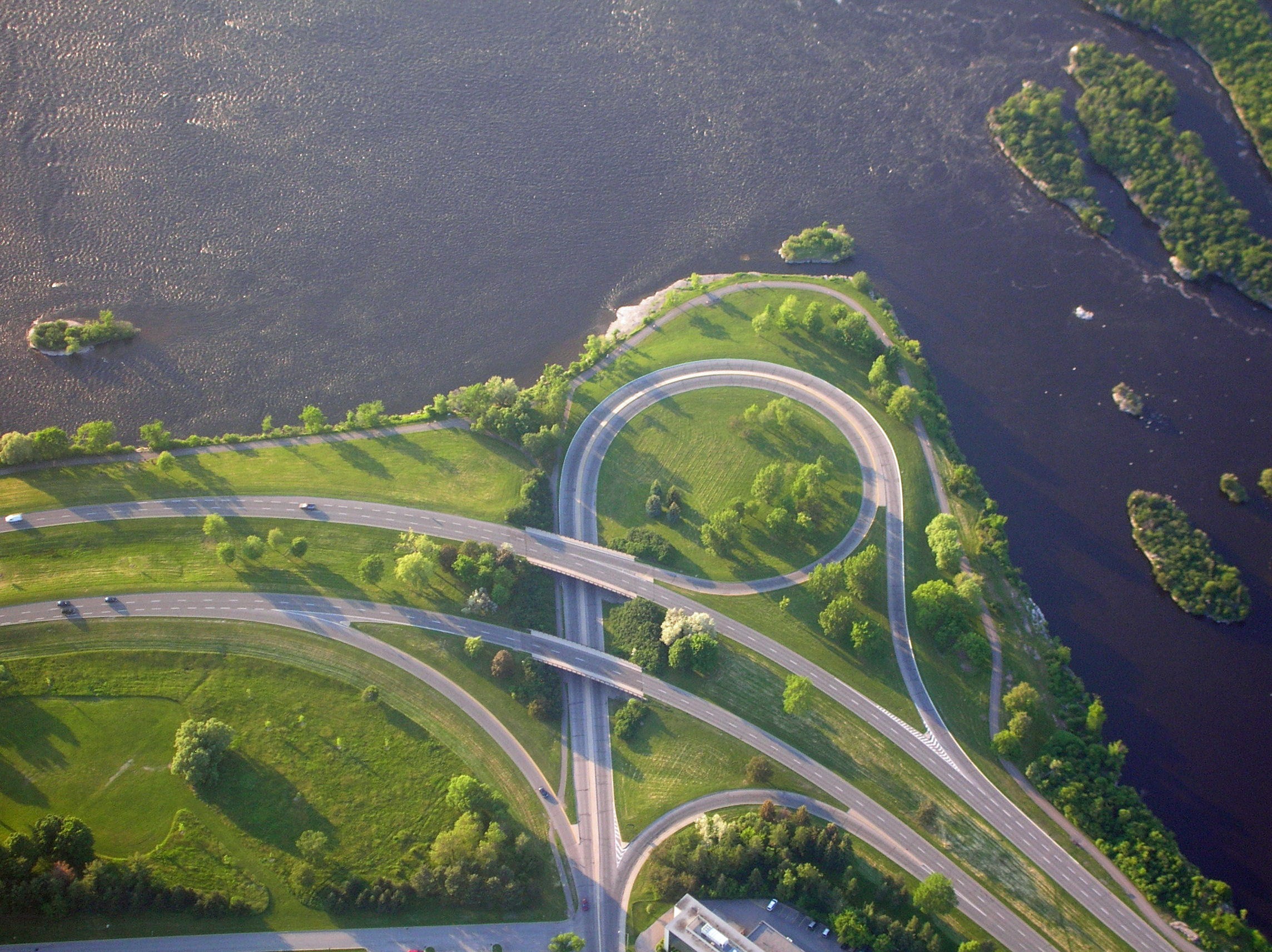
Kichi Zibi Mikan interchange in Ottawa

Southern Ontario has a highly developed transport system, including many highways, airports, ports, trains, and buses. The freeway system in Southern Ontario is referred to as the King's highways system, or the 400 series highways. The freeways are digitally monitored by the Ministry of Transportation (Ontario) using the COMPASS-Freeway Traffic Management System With the long-awaited upgrade of Highway 406, all the freeways in Ontario are at least 4 lanes wide, fully controlled with interchanges and divided. The major freeways are 400, 401, 402, 403, 404, 405, 406, 407 (Toll), 409, 410, 412, 416, 417, 418, 420, 427, Don Valley Parkway, Gardiner Expressway, Queen Elizabeth Way, Queensway, Lincoln M. Alexander Parkway, Red Hill Valley Parkway, Conestoga Parkway, and the E. C. Row Expressway.

Southern Ontario also has several border crossings with the United States. The Ambassador Bridge, unfinished Gordie Howe International Bridge, Detroit–Windsor Tunnel, and Blue Water Bridge connect the region with the U.S. state of Michigan, while the Peace Bridge, Rainbow Bridge, Whirlpool Rapids Bridge, Lewiston–Queenston Bridge, Thousand Islands Bridge, Ogdensburg–Prescott International Bridge, and Seaway International Bridge link Southern Ontario with the U.S. state of New York.

The region has a long history of marine transportation, with hundreds of millions of tonnes of cargo moving along the Great Lakes, and Saint Lawrence Seaway each year. The Welland Canal is a vital part of the Great Lakes Waterway, allowing ships to avoid Niagara Falls. The St. Clair River and Detroit River are also well travelled rivers between Lake Huron and Lake Erie in the Windsor, Sarnia area. Major regional ports include the Port of Hamilton and Port of Windsor, with smaller ports in Oshawa, Toronto, Goderich and Sarnia. Southern Ontario also has thousands of other freshwater lakes and rivers, as well as the Trent-Severn Waterway and Rideau Canal.

Inter-city train service in the region is provided mainly by Via Rail. The Greater Toronto area also has a commuter train system called the GO Train, which is supplemented by a network of bus services.

There are several major international airports, including the busiest airport in the country, Toronto Pearson International Airport (ranked 15th busiest worldwide by flights in 2014), Ottawa Macdonald–Cartier International Airport, John C. Munro Hamilton International Airport, London International Airport, and Region of Waterloo International Airport. Many Southern Ontarians living close to the Michigan or New York State borders use either Detroit Metropolitan Wayne County Airport or Buffalo Niagara International Airport as their local airport.

== Climate ==
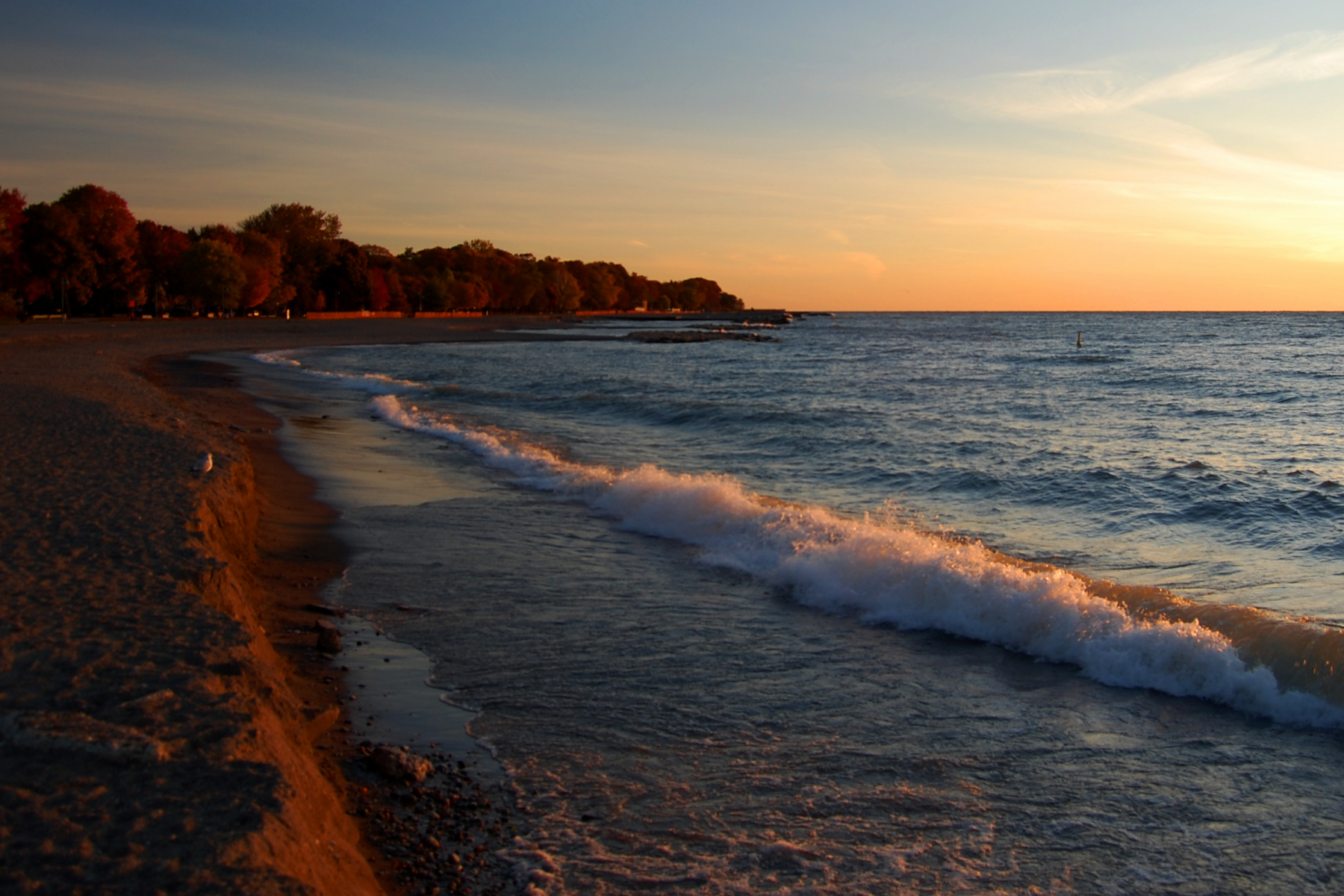
Typical Great Lakes beach

Southern Ontario has a humid continental climate with four distinct seasons. The average highs in July for the region range between 25 and 29 °C (77 and 84 °F). The average high in January ranges from −6 to 0 °C (21 to 32 °F). The highest recorded temperature in Southern Ontario was 45 and 52 °C (113 and 126 °F) with the humidex. During cold snaps, winter temperatures can occasionally drop below −30 °C (−22 °F). The climate found over most of southern Ontario falls within the Dfb and Dfa climate subtypes, much warmer or milder than the northern part of the province due to lower latitude, presence of bodies of water, and intense urbanization.

Harsh weather is not uncommon in the region. In the summer months, Southern Ontario is susceptible to tornadoes but far more often, straight line wind damage, hail and localized flooding from severe thunderstorms. Although the majority of tornadoes rarely cause excessive damage, the region is on the periphery of Tornado Alley and (F4) tornadoes touchdown every few decades, causing widespread damage. Southern Ontario also gets hurricane remnants, floods, ice storms, heavy fog, hail, and blizzards.

Small earthquakes occur in the region. The M_{w} 5.8 Cornwall–Massena earthquake occurred in 1944 and had a maximum Mercalli intensity of VII (Very strong).

Many tourists visit the area in the autumn months to look at the bright, vibrant colours of fall foliage.

Southern Ontario has a very different climate from the rest of the country. It is the only area of Canada that has Carolinian forest. Many trees, plants, and wildlife in Southern Ontario are not found anywhere else in Canada. Some rare trees in this region include the tulip tree, pawpaw fruit tree, and the cucumber tree. The Carolinian forests of Southern Ontario have in large part been destroyed by development sprawl. Very few original growth areas remain.

The region has the most freshwater beaches in the nation. With relatively warm waters by mid-summer due to the hot and humid summer months with significant coastlines of white sand, the major beaches in the region are visited by millions of tourists every summer. The most popular beaches are Wasaga Beach, Grand Bend, Sauble Beach, and Sandbanks.

== See also ==
- Subregions in Southern Ontario
  - Central Ontario
  - Eastern Ontario
  - Golden Horseshoe
  - Southwestern Ontario
- Great Lakes region
- Great Lakes Megalopolis
