= Road Emergency Services Communications Unit =

Toronto traffic management system

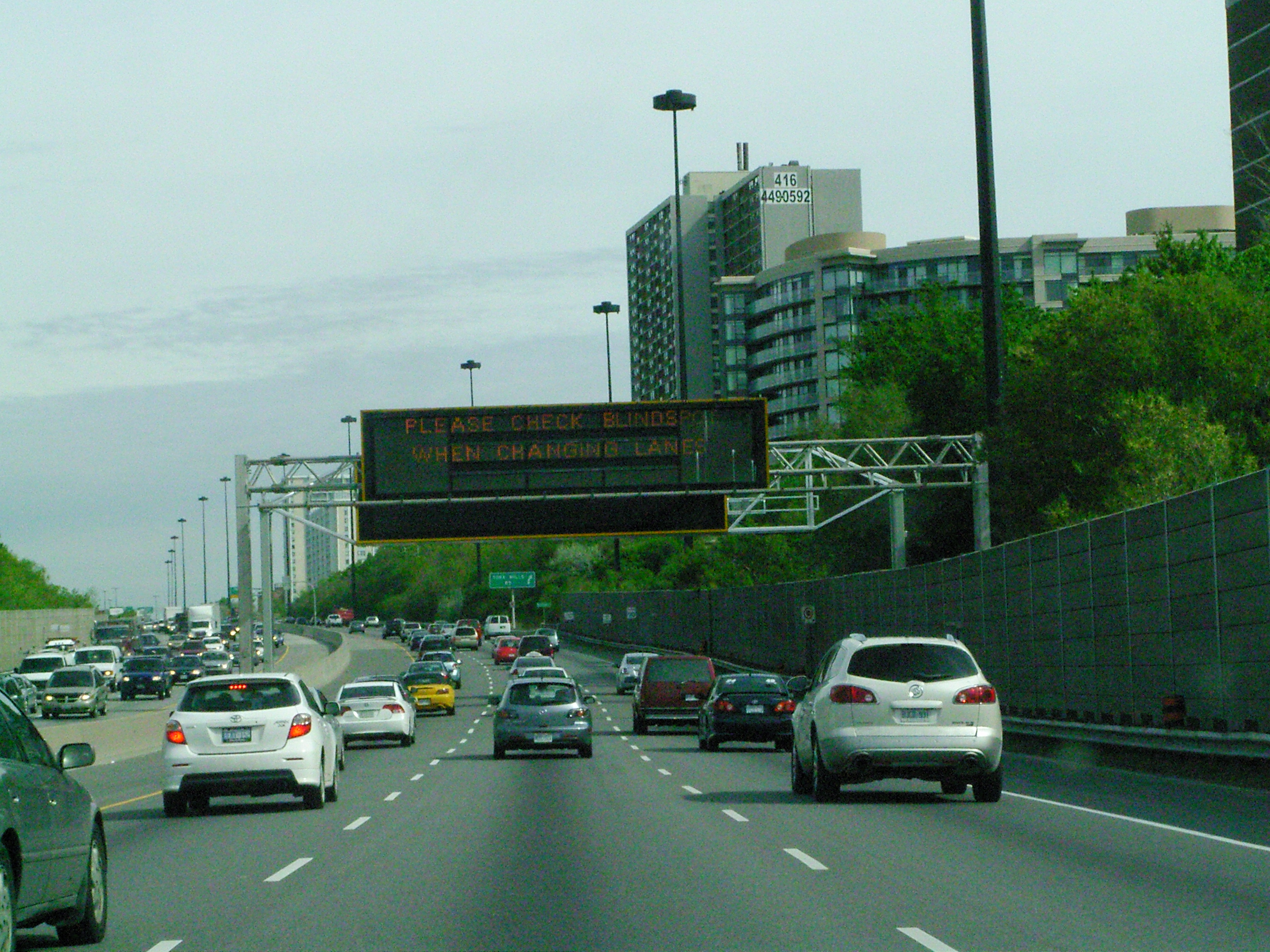
Changeable Message Sign (CMS) on northbound Don Valley Parkway, part of the RESCU traffic management system. The CMS in Toronto are being replaced by a walk-in variation.

The Road Emergency Services Communications Unit (RESCU) is a traffic management system used by the City of Toronto on city managed highways. The system is used to monitor traffic on:

- Gardiner Expressway from the Queen Elizabeth Way to the Don Valley Parkway - 28 cameras
- Don Valley Parkway from the Gardiner Expressway to Ontario Highway 401 - 17 cameras
- Lake Shore Boulevard from near Parkside Drive to Leslie Street - 17 cameras
- Allen Road from Finch Avenue West to Eglinton Avenue - 9 cameras

Various intersections through the GTA are also monitored including Woodbine Avenue and Steeles Avenue / Ontario Highway 404, Black Creek Drive and Lawrence Avenue West, Don Mills Road and Overlea Boulevard, and Warden Avenue and Ellesmere Road.

The 35 kilometres (22 mi) system consists of:

- 70+ traffic cameras
- 635 vehicle sensors
- 5 overhead changeable message signs - Gardiner Expressway and Don Valley Parkway
- 4 portable signs
- 121 detector stations (650 loops)
- Remote Traffic Information System (RTIS) - website
- Queue End Warning System - reminder for drivers that Allen Road ends at Eglinton Avenue West by using flashing light/sign and display screen on southbound Allen Road at Glengrove Avenue and south of Viewmount Avenue; advisory overhead sign at Flemingdon Road.

== See also ==
RESCU is linked to the Ontario Ministry of Transportation's Freeway Traffic Management System or COMPASS.
