= Milne Hollow =

Park in Toronto, Canada

- Location within Toronto
- Type: Public Park
- Location: Toronto, Ontario
- Coordinates: 43°44′21″N 79°20′04″W
- Operator: City of Toronto

Milne Hollow is a 50-hectare (120-acre) valley site in Toronto, Ontario, Canada within the valley of the East Don River. It is located in north-west central Toronto where the Don Valley Parkway intersects with Lawrence Avenue East. It was the location of pioneer Alexander Milne's mill town known as Milnesford Mills and his homestead farm. Today it is dominated by transportation uses, (including two rail lines, an expressway and an arterial road) with parkland alongside. The parkland has seen recent naturalization efforts by the City of Toronto government and volunteer organizations, including the opening of the East Don Trail in 2012.

== Description ==
Milne Hollow is a wide section of the valley of the East Don River. It was first inhabited by Europeans in the 19th century. The Milne family set up a pioneer farm and mill on the river. The river itself flows from the north-west to the south-east of the hollow. To the north-west and south-east, the river floodplains are forested. Along the south and west slopes of the hollow, the Canadian National rail line crosses the hollow, following the river valley. Along north-south lines, the Don Valley Parkway descends into the hollow where a large interchange exists for access to Lawrence Avenue, an arterial road crossing the hollow on an east-west direction.

Other than transportation uses, the hollow is in a natural state. In the south-east quadrant is Moccasin Trail Park. Along the river, and occupying the east bank of the river and the south-east quadrant of the valley is the Charles Sauriol Conservation Reserve, which continues to the south-east along the East Don River.

== Milnesford Mills ==
The small village of Milneford Mills was located along Lawrence Avenue at its crossing of the river. The Milne family moved to the site in 1832, moving its mill operations from the Milne farm located further to the west (the property known as Edwards Gardens today), due to low flows of water. In 1846, Milne built a woolen mill. In 1878, the entire mill village was swept away by a flood but the Milnes decided to rebuild.

The woolen mill operated into the 20th century before being abandoned. The mill building was demolished years later in 1946 to re-use its bricks. The floods of Hurricane Hazel in 1954 destroyed what was left of the mill site and buildings. One house remained and it was used for the Civic Gardens Centre (today known as the Toronto Botanical Garden) until the 1960s.

== Don Valley Parkway project ==
As the Greater Toronto Area grew in population after World War II, the Province of Ontario set up a special regional government in Toronto known as Metropolitan Toronto to build and manage the infrastructure for the growing suburbs. One of Metro's priority projects upon its founding in 1954, was the construction of the Don Valley Parkway expressway from downtown Toronto to the Ontario Highway 401. The route chosen followed the lower Don valley to the forks of the Don River, then proceeded north along the 'right-of-way' assigned to Woodbine Avenue in the grid layout of Toronto. This crossed the valley of the East Don at Lawrence, which was a dirt road at the time. As part of Metro's road-building project, Lawrence was expanded to a six-lane arterial road through Milne Hollow. A cloverleaf-style interchange with the DVP was constructed, the interchange necessitating the removal of the rest of the Milne buildings except for a house on the east bank of the river, south-east of the interchange. The East Don also crossed Lawrence at the same point as the interchange, and roadways were built around the existing path of the river. The river channel was itself 'channelized' using concrete and fill for flood control through the interchange. The river channel south-east of the parkway was mostly preserved, except for the use of concrete fill to curb erosion.

== Don Valley Ski Centre ==
The eastern slope, just south of Lawrence Avenue, was used for downhill skiing. The facility was known as the Don Valley Ski Centre and was run by the Don Valley Ski Club. The centre featured three lifts - two rope and one Poma. When the snow was unreliable, the centre used its $70,000 artificial snow-making machine. Lift passes were between $3 and $5. Opened in the 1950s, the facility closed in the 1970s. Some of the remains of the facility still exist. It is located on the eastern slope

== Today ==
In 2012, the East Don Trail was extended north through the Charles Sauriol Reserve along the east bank of the Don River up to Lawrence Avenue and Milne Hollow. The Trail connects also to the Moccasin Creek Trail, which goes west to the neighbourhood of Don Mills. Along the south and western slopes, a rail line is used by the GO train commuter train. The rail line was originally built by the Canadian Northern Railway.
