= Ride for Heart =

Charity bicycle ride in Canada

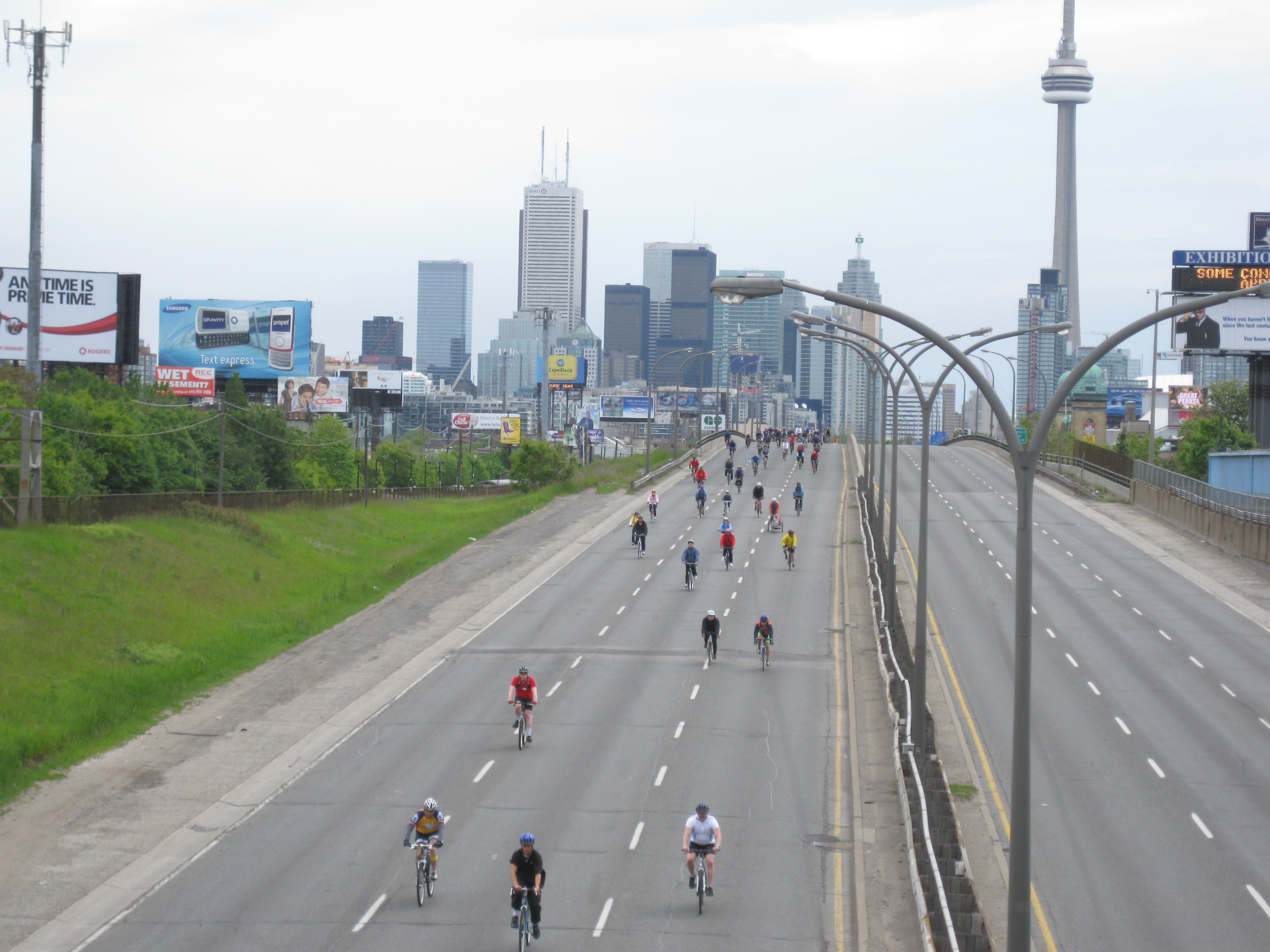
Cyclists on the Gardiner Expressway during the 2009 Ride for Heart. To the east is visible downtown Toronto.

The Ride for Heart is a charity bicycle ride organized by the Heart and Stroke Foundation of Ontario. For more than 20 years it was sponsored by margarine brand Becel. In November 2017, Manulife was announced as the new title sponsor starting in 2018.

The Ride takes place on Toronto's Don Valley Parkway (DVP) and Gardiner Expressway, major six-lane highways leading into the downtown core on the eastern and southern side of the city. On the first Sunday of every June, the DVP and Gardiner are closed and turned over to the Ride in the morning. Three routes are planned out, at 25, 50, and 75 km, offering a challenge for recreational and endurance riders alike. Shorter rollerblading events were formerly included, but were not available in 2012.

The first Ride took place on this route in 1987, and has grown immensely since then. In 2011 the Ride for Heart attracted a capacity 13,000 riders and raised $3.9 million in funds towards heart and stroke research, education and advocacy. Nine out of ten Canadians are at risk of heart disease or stroke conditions, and one in three Canadians die from heart disease or stroke. Each year, about 250,000 potential years of life are lost in Canada due to cardiovascular diseases, including heart attacks and other chronic heart-related conditions.

The Ride turned 25 on June 3, 2012, and raised a record $5 million.

In 2020, the Ride was cancelled and shifted to a virtual format due to the COVID-19 pandemic. Reinstated the following year, it has returned to an annual in-person format.
