= Don Valley Parkway =

Controlled-access highway in Ontario

Don Valley Parkway
- The DVP; Route of Heroes
- Don Valley Parkway highlighted in red

Route information
- Maintained by Toronto Transportation Services
- Length: 15.0 km (9.3 mi)
- History: Proposed 1954; Opened August 31, 1961 – November 17, 1966

Major junctions
- North end: Highway 401 (continues as Highway 404)
- Bloor Street East / Danforth Avenue; Eglinton Avenue East
- South end: Gardiner Expressway – Downtown Toronto

Location
- Country: Canada
- Province: Ontario
- Major cities: Toronto

Highway system
- Toronto municipal expressways
(by date opened)
← Gardiner Expressway (1955)	Don Valley Parkway (1961)	Allen Road (1964) →
Ontario municipal expressways
(in alphabetical order)
← Black Creek Drive	Don Valley Parkway	Dougall Parkway →

The Don Valley Parkway (DVP) is a municipal expressway in Toronto, Ontario, Canada, which connects the Gardiner Expressway in downtown Toronto with Highway 401. North of Highway 401, it continues as Highway 404. The parkway runs through the parklands of the Don River valley, after which it is named. It has a maximum speed limit of 90 kilometres per hour (56 mph) for its entire length of 15.0 kilometres (9.3 mi). It is six lanes for most of its length, with eight lanes north of York Mills Road and four lanes south of Eastern Avenue. As a municipal road, it is patrolled by the Toronto Police Service.

The parkway was the second expressway to be built by Metropolitan Toronto (Metro) after the Gardiner Expressway. Planning began in 1954, the year of Metro's formation. The first section opened during 1961 and the entire route was completed to Sheppard Avenue by the end of 1966. South of Bloor Street, the parkway was constructed over existing roadways. North of Bloor Street, it was built on a new alignment through the valley, requiring the removal of several hills, diversion of the Don River and the clearing of woodland. North of Eglinton Avenue, the parkway follows the former Woodbine Avenue right-of-way north to Highway 401. A proposed extension to Steeles Avenue was instead taken over by the province and built as Highway 404, which also absorbed the Metro-built segment between Sheppard and Highway 401. The parkway was planned to be one of several municipal and provincial north–south expressways into downtown Toronto. The others, the Spadina Expressway (Allen Road) and a proposed southern extension of Highway 400 were truncated due to public opposition, leaving the parkway as the sole north–south expressway connecting downtown to the northern areas of Metro; the only other complete north-south freeway connecting to the Gardiner Expressway is Highway 427 at Toronto's west end.

Traffic conditions on the parkway often exceed its intended capacity of 60,000 vehicles per day. Today, some sections carry an average of 100,000 vehicles a day and have bumper-to-bumper traffic conditions during commuting hours. The parkway is also used by regional transit buses which can access designated lanes to pass slow-moving traffic. Locals refer to the parkway as the "Don Valley Parking Lot" due to slow-moving, congested traffic.

In November 2023, the municipal and provincial governments announced a tentative deal which will see responsibility for the Don Valley Parkway and the Gardiner Expressway transferred to the province and both maintained as provincial highways.

== Route description ==
The Don Valley Parkway begins at an interchange with the Gardiner Expressway near the mouth of the Don River in downtown Toronto. From there, the parkway runs northwards on the eastern bank of the valley, between the river and the developed city to the east. Beyond the southern, older section of the city, the valley widens and the parkway continues northwards through the parklands along the river to Don Mills Road. The route leaves the valley, rises to meet Eglinton Avenue, descends into the valley again and goes through the park lands of Milne Hollow to Lawrence Avenue. The parkway ascends to meet York Mills Road and ends at Highway 401, with the physical road continuing as Highway 404.

=== South of the Forks ===
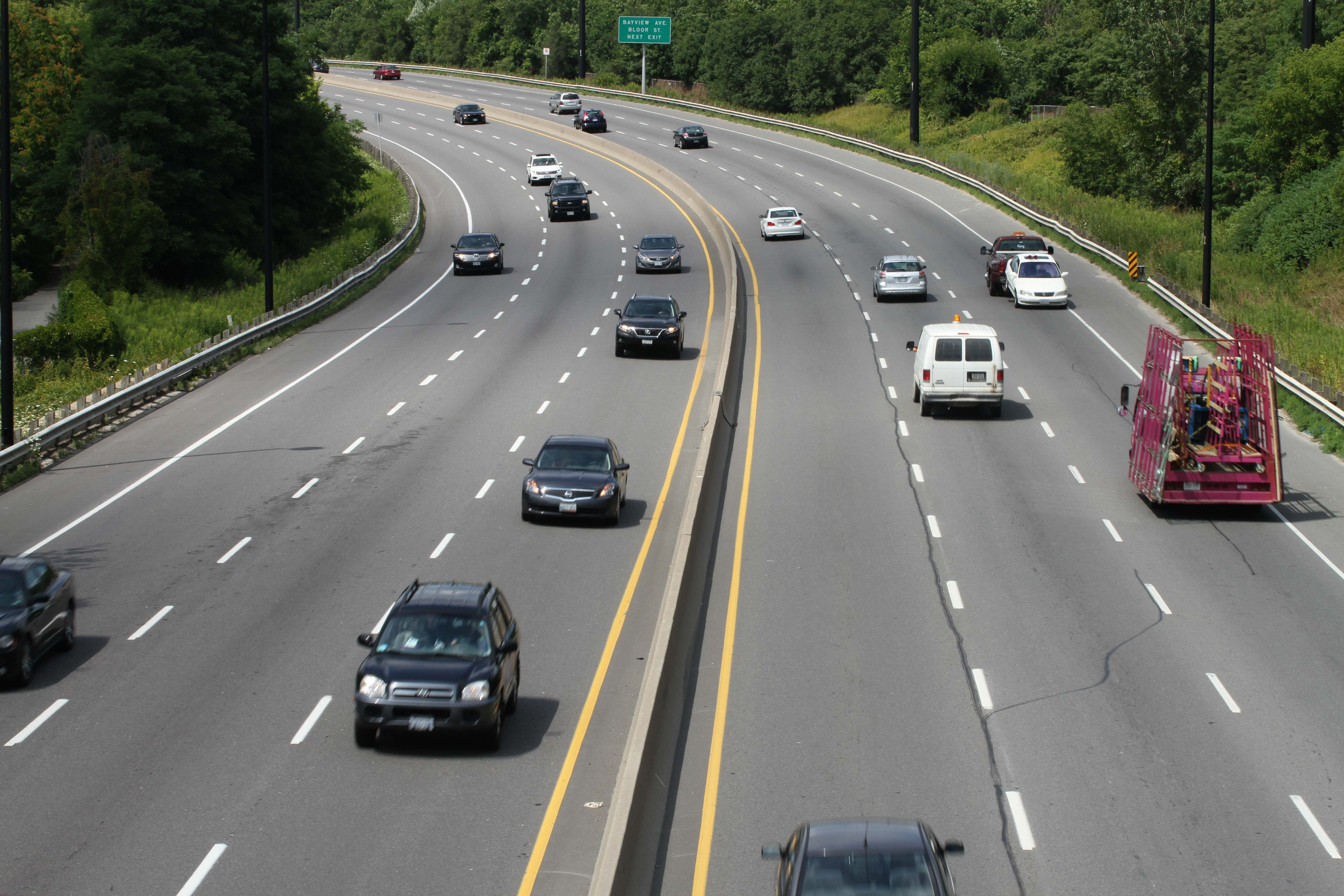
The Don Valley Parkway at Riverdale Park

At its southern end near the mouth of the Don River, the parkway begins in a multiple-level interchange with the ground-level Lake Shore Boulevard and the elevated Gardiner Expressway directly above the boulevard. The Gardiner–Don Valley ramps provide access to the section of the Gardiner Expressway west of the parkway. There is no access either from or to the Gardiner east of the parkway (before the Gardiner's east end realignment that commenced in 2021, the Gardiner ended shortly after crossing the Don River as it descended and merged into Lake Shore Boulevard via the Logan Avenue ramp from 2002-2021, prior to that the elevated Gardiner extended to Leslie Street from 1966-2001 where it was known as Gardiner East). To travel east from the southbound lanes of the parkway, motorists must exit via an off-ramp that meets the Lake Shore Boulevard at a signalized intersection.

Less than 500 metres (1,600 ft) north of the Gardiner, the Canadian National Railway (CNR)/GO Toronto railway viaduct passes over the parkway. The interchange is constrained by that distance for the Gardiner—Don Valley two-lane ramps bridge the difference in height from ground-level under the viaduct with the height of the Gardiner. Acceleration and deceleration lanes for the Lake Shore—Don Valley ramps connect under the viaduct.

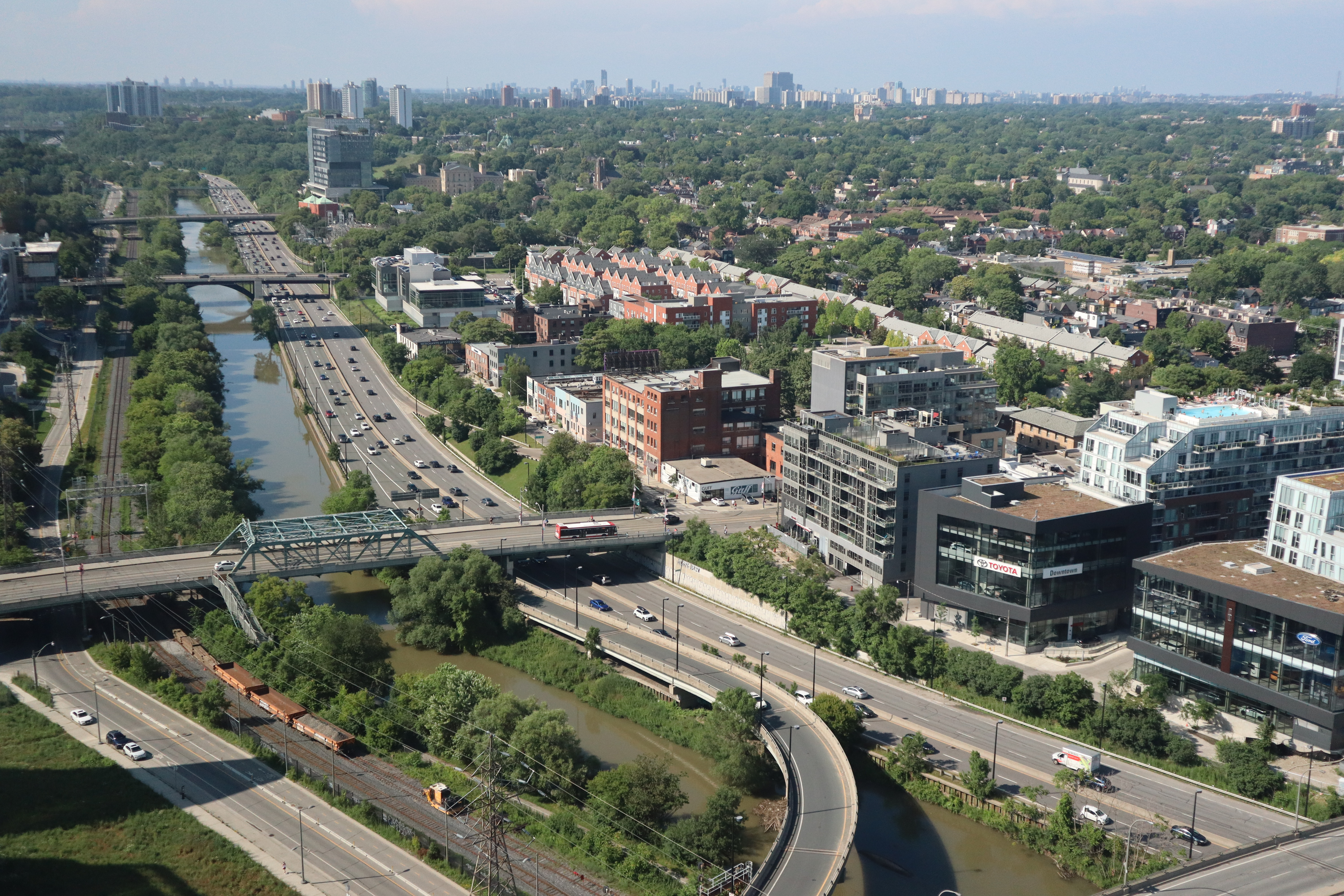
The southern section of the Don Valley Parkway parallel to the Don River, looking north

From the viaduct, the parkway proceeds north as a four-lane freeway on a straight course along the east bank of the channelized Don River, passing beneath the Eastern Avenue Bypass viaduct and veering slightly to the east as it passes below Queen Street East. On- and off-ramps project northward from the Eastern Avenue viaduct, each adding a lane to both carriageways. The expressway continues northward, with the Don River sandwiched between the highway and Bayview Avenue. The Parkway passes beneath Dundas and Gerrard Streets and rises onto the 'Don Flats' plateau at Riverdale Park. In this section, the elevation of the highway is close to the level of the river and is liable to flood after heavy rains, as occurred in June 2010, for example.

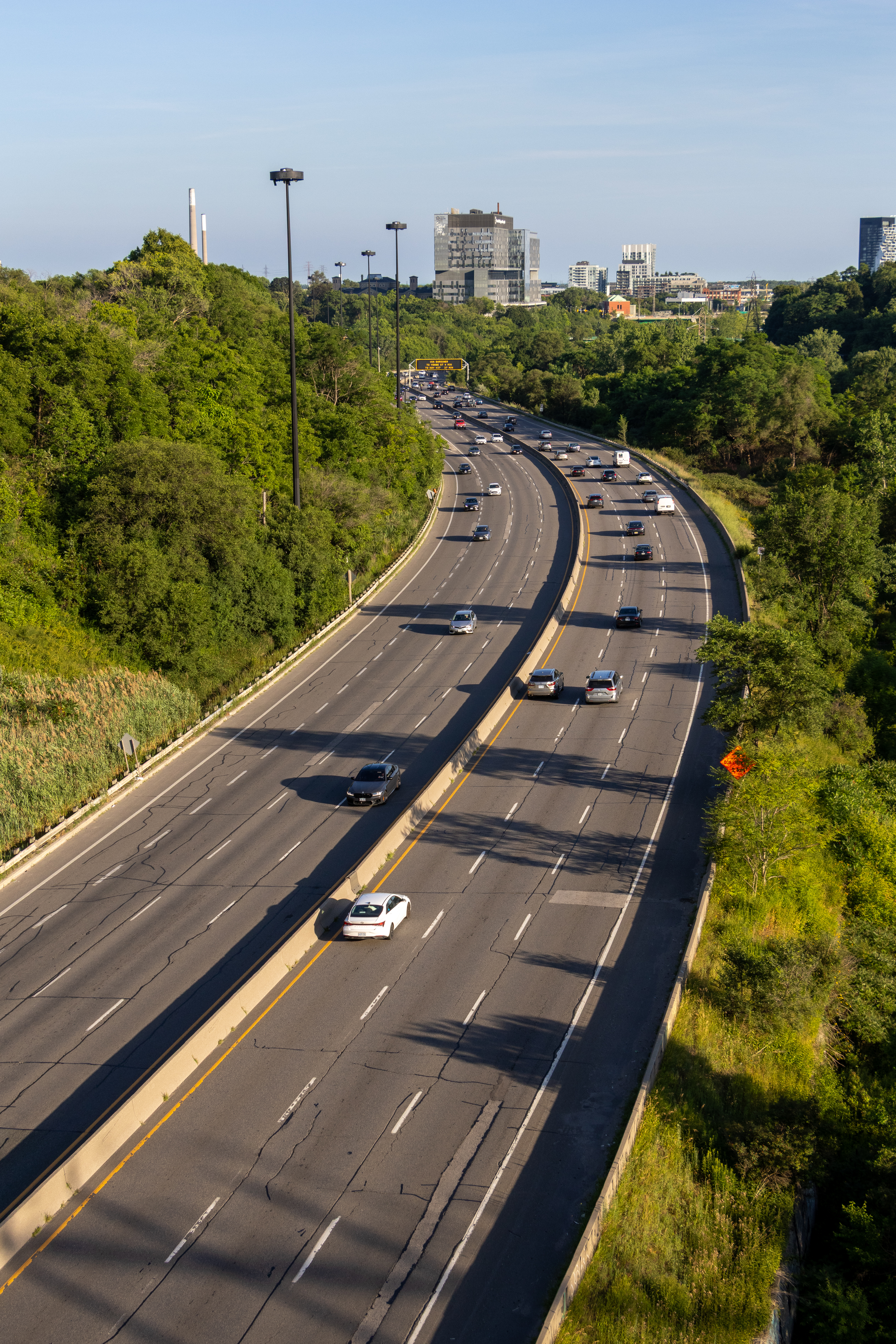
The Don Valley Parkway seen from the Prince Edward Viaduct

North from Riverdale Park, the valley widens considerably. The expressway rises from the floor of the valley and passes beneath the towering Prince Edward Viaduct bridge, which connects Bloor Street with Danforth Avenue and carries a subway line. The highway runs along the eastern wall of the valley for the next several kilometres, rising and dipping repeatedly.

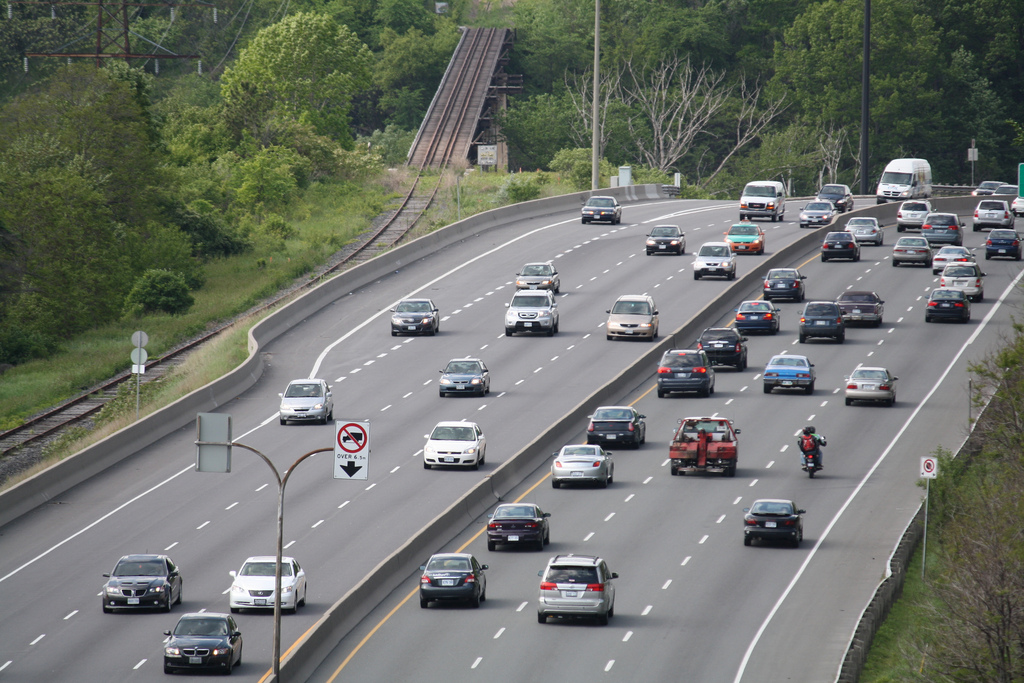
The parkway passes the 'Half-mile' bridge on the left.

The expressway curves eastward into a cut in the hillside as it passes the 'Half-mile' railway bridge. Immediately to the north, it meets the Bayview Avenue–Bloor Street connector at a trumpet interchange. The long off-ramp to these roads was the original southern terminus of the parkway in 1961. The off-ramp was later proposed as the eastern terminus of the proposed Crosstown Expressway. This expressway, opposed by the City of Toronto, was never built: it was intended for construction only after the completion of the Spadina Expressway, which itself was cancelled in 1971.

Just north of the Bayview–Bloor interchange, the expressway passes over Pottery Road. To the east is Todmorden Mills, a collection of historic buildings and a former industrial site, the original "Don Mills". The nearby pond was a section of the Don River cut off by the parkway construction. Further north, to the west where the highway crosses Beechwood Avenue, is Crothers Woods, a restoration site.

The expressway continues east along the southern edge of the valley. The opposing lanes split as the expressway passes beneath the Leaside Bridge, the southbound lanes at a lower level. The lanes rejoin as they approach the Don Mills Road interchange at the "forks of the Don". Just east of the Don Mills Road interchange, several large white sculptures resembling human teeth are installed on both sides of the road. The sculptures, called The Elevated Wetlands, are examples of "eco-art" and have become a landmark. The sculptures resemble concrete but are made of plastic and filled with waste plastic and wetland plants. The sculptures function as a water filter, removing pollutants from the Don River. A solar-powered pump lifts water to the top of the sculpture and it is returned to the Don after filtration. The sculptures were installed in 1998 and the wetland plants added in 1999.

=== North to Highway 401 ===
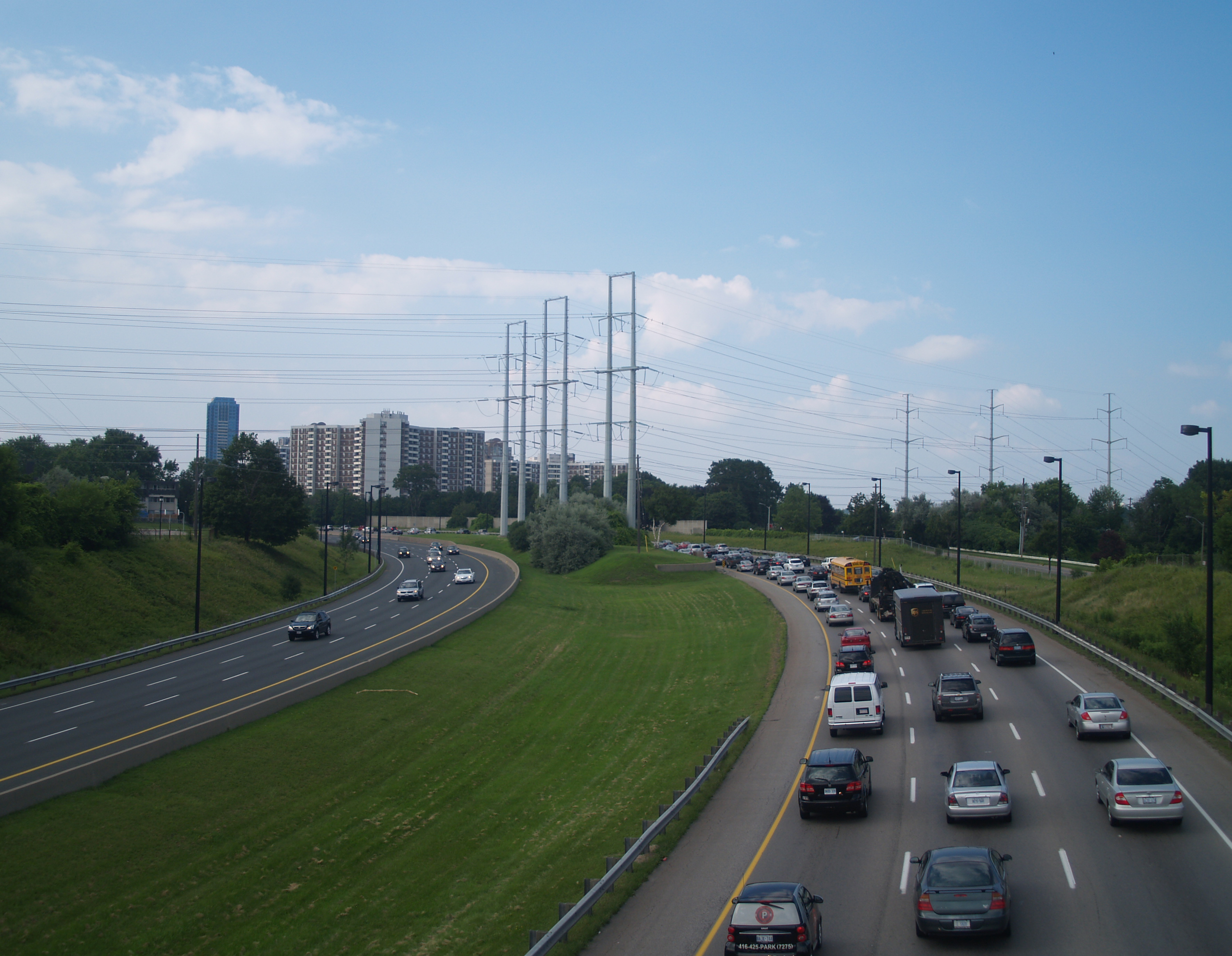
The parkway passes beneath the Gatineau Hydro Corridor south of Eglinton Avenue.

The expressway crosses Taylor-Massey Creek and the East Don River, and climbs out of the valley, swinging northwards toward Eglinton Avenue. In this section, the DVP passes around the apartment buildings of Flemingdon Park. The lanes split again before the underpass at Spanbridge Road, the road that connects a three-tower complex of apartments to the east of the parkway with Flemingdon Park to the west. The lanes pass beneath the Gatineau Hydro Corridor and reconnect south of the Eglinton interchange.

As it crosses Eglinton, the expressway passes a business park to the west and the Concorde Place commercial and condominium development to the east. The expressway begins to descend back into the East Don Valley. It passes beneath Wynford Drive and two railways (the CPR Midtown line and the CNR/Richmond Hill GO line) before reaching Lawrence Avenue East, one of the few remaining cloverleaf interchanges in Ontario. This area, known as Milne Hollow, is partially forested, some of the land being conservation reserve.

Passing beneath Lawrence Avenue and back over the East Don River, the expressway begins climbing out of the valley once more. Residential sub-divisions are present along both sides of the road, isolated from the expressway by noise barriers, from north of Lawrence to Highway 401. It reaches the top of the valley and curves along a plateau before rising and passing over York Mills Road and Underpass Gate, right after the latter provincial control of the road begins. At a large interchange with Highway 401 (built and maintained by the province), the northbound lanes splits into two branches: two left lanes continuing north as Highway 404, and the three others exit to Highway 401 westbound and eastbound.

North of the interchange with Highway 401, a former segment of the parkway continues to an interchange with Sheppard Avenue (both that section and the Sheppard overpass were built by Metro), which has since been incorporated as part of Highway 404 in 1977 and has been widened in the early 2000s with a short collector-express system.

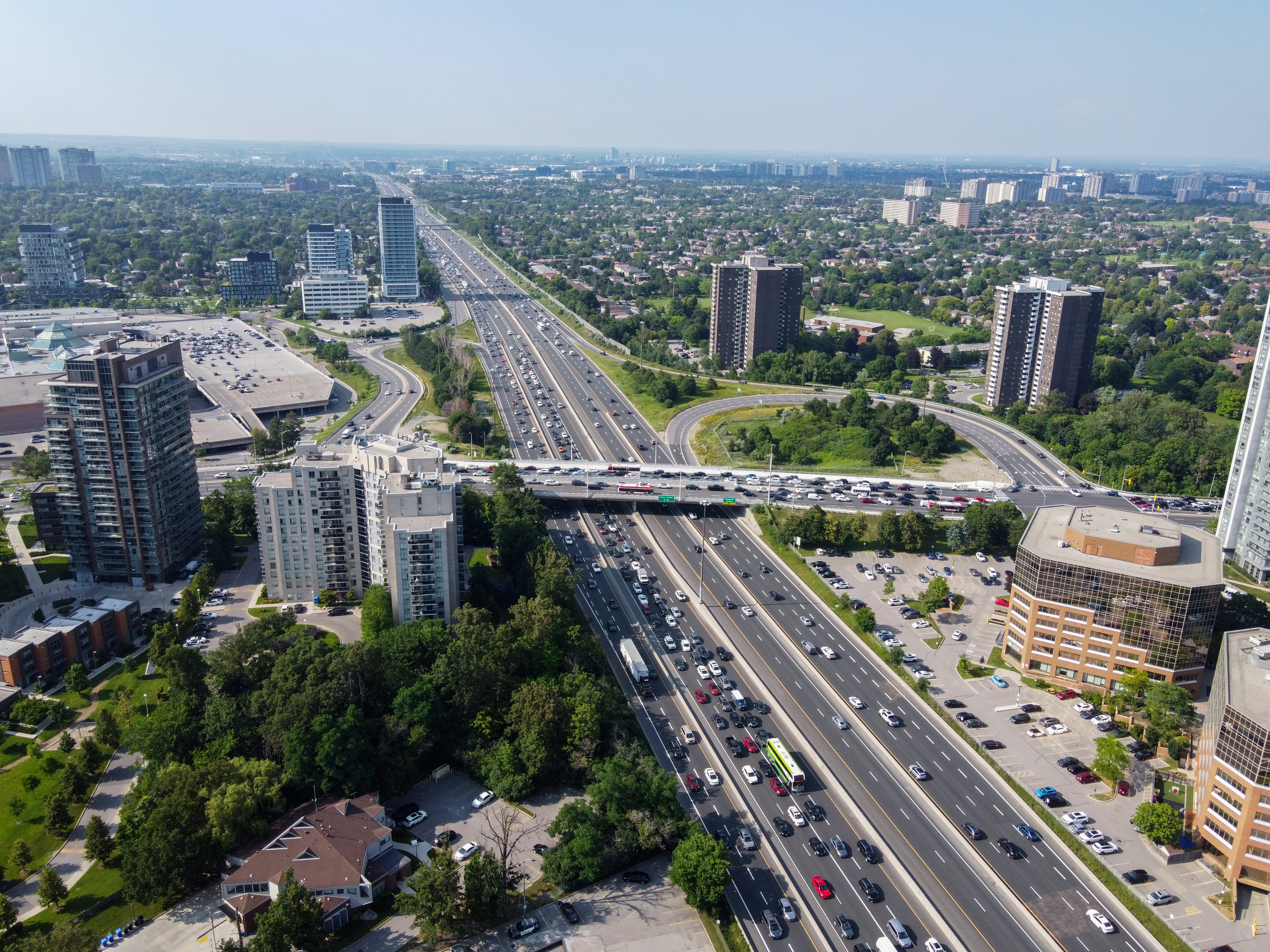
Originally built as part of the Don Valley Parkway, the segment north of Highway 401 including the interchange with Sheppard Avenue became part of Highway 404 in 1977.

=== Traffic cameras ===
The entire length of the parkway uses the RESCU Traffic Management System, which was installed in 1994. Like the similar COMPASS system on provincial freeways, RESCU combines in-pavement sensors with traffic cameras and changeable message signs (6 fixed and 10 portable) to alert drivers of accidents, traffic conditions and upcoming closures. The system is used as a means of managing traffic flow along the parkway. The message signs also frequently display non-urgent messages to motorists, such as notices for future construction, safety messages and smog alerts.

The RESCU Traffic Cameras are located at regular intervals along the parkway. The cameras, which are operated by the City of Toronto, can be viewed on television and online. The cameras are located on poles and are fixed in direction. There are 16 camera locations on the parkway. Most have one camera for northbound and one for southbound traffic. RESCU operators monitor the cameras for emergency purposes; local radio and television media use the service for traffic reports.

=== Traffic congestion ===
Traffic volume
	Direction	
Segment	Southbound	Northbound
Gardiner to Dundas	39,587	48,028
Dundas to Bloor	52,662	64,503
Bloor to Don Mills	53,710	66,781
Don Mills to Eglinton	78,619	66,245
Eglinton to Lawrence	90,764	84,619
Lawrence to York Mills	87,432	83,880
York Mills to 401	93,852	92,125
Average weekday traffic volume per 24-hour period, surveyed from 2002 to 2006

The Don Valley Parkway, along with the Gardiner Expressway, is one of Toronto's busiest municipal routes. It is the sole north–south expressway into Toronto's downtown, a role it was not designed to support. The parkway was planned as one of a series of expressways to provide commuter routes to downtown from the expanding suburbs. Two other un-built expressways were planned: the Scarborough Expressway, expected to handle traffic between downtown and the eastern suburbs, and the Spadina Expressway, expected to serve traffic from the north-west. By the early 1980s, traffic volumes on the parkway exceeded capacity, and today, the parkway has significant traffic congestion on most days. During the morning commute, commuters fill the southbound lanes as far south as Bloor Street. In the afternoon/evening commute, commuters fill the northbound lanes from Bloor Street, and often the full length of the highway in event of a collision or other hazard. The daily congestion has earned the highway the quasi-affectionate nickname of the "Don Valley Parking Lot".

The section immediately south of Highway 401 is often congested at all hours. Traffic studies have attributed congestion in the southbound lanes to the number of lanes merging from Highways 401 and 404 into the parkway and the lane changing that results from merging traffic from Highway 401 clashing with exiting traffic to the nearby York Mills exit. Congestion in the northbound lanes is attributed to truck traffic coping with the steep grade of the valley, lane changing, and insufficient advanced signage for Highway 401. Most traffic in this section travels north on Highway 404, but only two of the five lanes lead to it.

== History ==
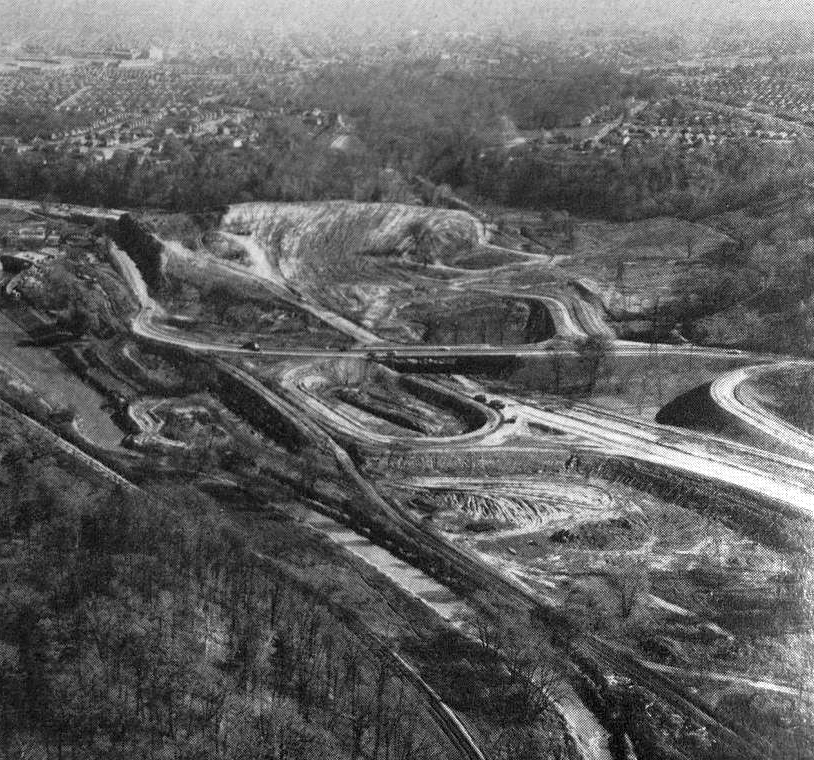
Tumpers Hill (mostly removed in this 1959 photograph) was excavated for the construction of the parkway

The construction of the Don Valley Parkway was a major undertaking that changed much of the Don valley. While industrial areas existed both near the mouth of the Don River and the area of today's Leaside Bridge, several natural areas remained in those places where the steep sides of the valley had dissuaded large-scale urban development. The post-war growth period of Toronto provided an impetus to build a new automobile route into central Toronto, and the route through the valley was chosen to avoid expropriation of existing development and provide access for new development in the Metropolitan Toronto region. The construction of the six-lane highway modified the valley through the removal of hills, other earth works and the rerouting of the Don River. Since completion, the parkway has not been changed significantly, other than adding one partial interchange at Wynford Drive and updating its infrastructure to current standards.

=== Conditions before construction ===
The Don River valley, formed during the last ice age, has played an important role in the development of Toronto from its beginning as the Town of York. Using the power of the river, the first sawmill was erected at today's Todmorden Mills by 1795 and other industry was founded soon after, including a grist mill, paper mill and brewery (Helliwell or Don Brewery) by 1828. Railways were introduced into the valley after 1850 with the building of tracks into Toronto (Ontario, Simcoe and Huron Union Railroad had trackage at mouth of the Don after 1850 and Canadian Pacific Railway Toronto branch along the lower river after 1880s). By 1900, the Don River south of today's Bloor Street was straightened into a channel for boating purposes, with roadways and industry built on both banks. North of Bloor Street, the wide valley floor became dominated by industrial concerns of the Taylor family, including the Don Valley Brick Works. The area from the Forks of the Don and north along the river valleys had been lumbered and farmed, such as at Milne Hollow, but several natural areas remained by the 1950s. The forests of the Don valley had been where Canadian naturalist Ernest Thompson Seton spent much of his youth in the 1870s studying animal life.

The Don Valley Parkway was not the first highway planned through the valley. In the 1930s, a "speedway" through the lower valley was promoted as possible depression relief. Unlike today's parkway, this road would have curved northwest near the Don Valley Brick Works and connected to Mount Pleasant at Davisville. The city did not have the money and appealed to 'civic-minded citizens' to donate the land on which the highway would be built. None came forward. In 1939, city transportation planner Norman Wilson proposed a boulevard that would follow the valley into the northeast. On January 1, 1946, Toronto voters approved the building of a 'Don Valley Traffic Artery' following the same route as the "speedway" by a vote of 31,882 to 12,328. This was the same plebiscite where Toronto voters approved the construction of the Yonge segment of Line 1. The City then borrowed $1.5 million to finance the project. In 1949, the Official Plan of the City of Toronto updated the Don Valley Roadway plan to include two branches—one to the north-west which would eventually become the Crosstown Expressway proposal, and one to the north-east leading to O'Connor Drive. The original plan to connect to St. Clair remained. East York Township opposed construction of the north-east roadway. The City started the first section of this route from Eastern Avenue south to Keating Street in 1949, but had to suspend work in 1951 due to a lack of steel.

Recognizing the value of the natural spaces of the valley, conservationists such as Charles Sauriol founded the Don Valley Conservation Association, in 1948 to assist the provincial Don Valley Conservation Authority (DVCA) itself founded in 1946. The Association promoted conservation of the valley with rail tours and public events. In 1951, the Ontario Department of Planning and Development released its "Don Valley Conservation Report", which recommended the preservation of the valley, including an artificial reservoir where Lawrence Avenue crossed the Don River. It also proposed that the valley not be used for any new major transportation routes. The DVCA adopted the report and budgeted to buy lands in the valley, but the City of Toronto withheld funding to the DVCA for land purchases.

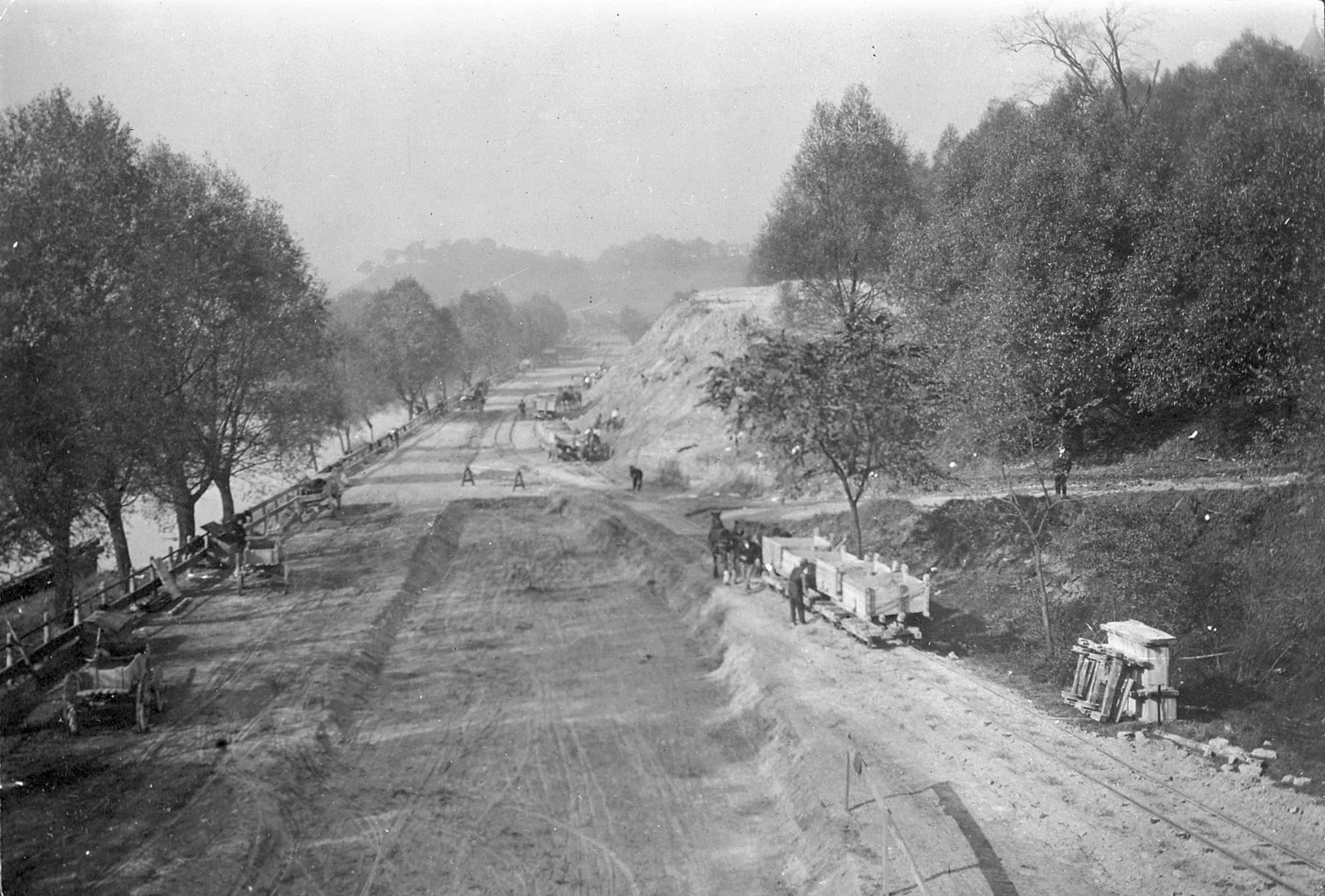
The Don Roadway travelled along the eastern banks of the Don River from the lake shore to Winchester Street.

In April 1953, the Metropolitan Toronto (Metro) federation was approved and Fred Gardiner was named as its first chairman. Its mission from the start was to build the infrastructure needed to support the rapidly growing suburbs, whose governments could not afford the projects and often disagreed on joint projects. One of its first priorities was to build the Lakeshore Expressway, and its second road priority was an expressway through the Don River valley. Gardiner was a major proponent of building a highway through the valley, since his days in the 1940s with the Toronto and York Planning Board. At the time, engineers felt that building a six-lane roadway was unfeasible due to the two large hills and a narrow valley. Gardiner and T&Y Board (and later Metro Planning Board) chairman James Maher personally walked the route through the valley, determining the works that would be needed to put the highway through. "We'll move the railway over a piece. We'll tear down the hill. We'll shift the river over a piece, then we can have the highway through there." Gardiner toured New York City in June 1954 to study the city's expressways and municipal parking lots. Gardiner compared the proposed Don Valley expressway to the scenic Grand Central Parkway, and was quoted as claiming that valleys like the Don are not spoiled by arterial highways, but beautified by them. The first Metro staff survey and feasibility study of the parkway's route was approved in late 1953, before the Metro government itself came into being in 1954.

In October 1954, flooding caused by Hurricane Hazel caused the destruction of bridges and buildings in the valley. As a consequence of the destruction on the Don and other rivers, the provincial government of Ontario banned development on river floodplains. In 1957, the Metropolitan Toronto and Region Conservation Authority (MTRCA) was formed, merging all conservation authorities responsible for Toronto watersheds (including the DVCA), with greater powers to manage valley lands. The MTRCA began expropriating privately owned land in the valley for flood control, often creating or conserving open space uses. Sauriol, who was by then an employee of the MTRCA, was one of the few to speak out against the parkway project. Sauriol's cottage at the Forks of the Don would be expropriated by Metro Toronto for the parkway, although much of his land is now part of the Charles Sauriol Conservation Reserve, which extends from the Forks of the Don, along the East Don to Milne Hollow at Lawrence Avenue, visible from the parkway. By contrast, Metro chairman Gardiner had an opposite opinion of the Don Valley and was quoted "I'll tell you what the Don Valley was. It was a place to murder little boys, that's what it was."

=== Construction ===
The parkway from the Leaside Bridge

The design of the project was contracted to the engineering consortium of Fenco-Harris, which completed the plans in the fall of 1955. The project included extending Bayview Avenue south along the Lower Don valley, which replaced the 'north' arm of the previous Don Valley roadway project, and the realignment of Lawrence Avenue over the East Don River. The design for the section north of the Don River mouth incorporated the existing river-side Don Roadway on the east side of the river. The design also incorporated a section of the old Don Mills Road leading up from the river, north of Gerrard, to Broadview Avenue and Danforth Avenue into the highway as a northbound on-ramp from Danforth. The project was designed to carry 60,000 vehicles per day. Fenco-Harris designed the route to be "located on public lands as much as possible, thus minimizing the expropriation of private property. Greenbelt land has been used for right-of-way in preference to acreage which can be commercially developed." The route required the expropriation of less than 25 properties.

The first planned route of the parkway was to follow the lower Don Valley before turning north and continuing along the Don Mills Road right-of-way north to the Toronto Bypass (today's Highway 401). Edward P. Taylor, developer of the Don Mills subdivision, situated at Don Mills Road and Lawrence Avenue, protested the plan heavily and the path was rerouted along the CPR railway from Don Mills Road and Eglinton Avenue north-east to meet the Woodbine Avenue right-of-way at Lawrence Avenue, and proceeded north to the Toronto Bypass. To facilitate the Flemingdon Park development, located south-east of Don Mills Road and Eglinton, the entire planned route south of Lawrence to the present interchange at Don Mills Road was moved east to its current alignment.

The plan, estimated to cost C$28.674 million, was approved by Metro Council in early 1956. Formal approval to build came in 1958 and construction of the parkway began. A stumbling block to construction was resolved by a deal between Metro and the City of Toronto over City-owned parklands needed for the parkway. North of Bloor Street, 30 acres (12 ha) of City-owned land would be transferred to Metro and any lands not needed for the parkway would be developed as parks by Metro. South of Bloor Street, Metro agreed to replace any recreation facilities lost in Riverdale Park due to the parkway construction. The City had threatened to not allow construction through City-owned land.

The first section of the parkway, from Bloor Street to Eglinton Avenue, was opened on August 31, 1961, by Ontario Premier Leslie Frost and Metro chairman Gardiner, who presented Frost with a silver plate. It opened initially without an interchange at Don Mills Road and had its first traffic jam that day at the Eglinton Avenue exit. The interchange at Don Mills was approved by Metro council on November 2, 1964. Building the section within the valley required significant civil engineering, including the rerouting of 3.2 kilometres (2.0 mi) of the Don River, installation of 1.6 kilometres (0.99 mi) of reinforced retaining wall and the removal of two hills. Tumper's Hill, located near the Don Mills Road interchange, stood 36 metres (118 ft) higher than it does today. Sugar Loaf Hill, shaped like a cone, which stood alone in the shadow of the Prince Edward Viaduct where Bayview Avenue passes today, was removed completely. The 1,250,000 cubic metres (1,630,000 cu yd) of earth was used as fill for the parkway and a total of 4,600,000 cubic metres (6,000,000 cu yd) of earth was excavated and moved.

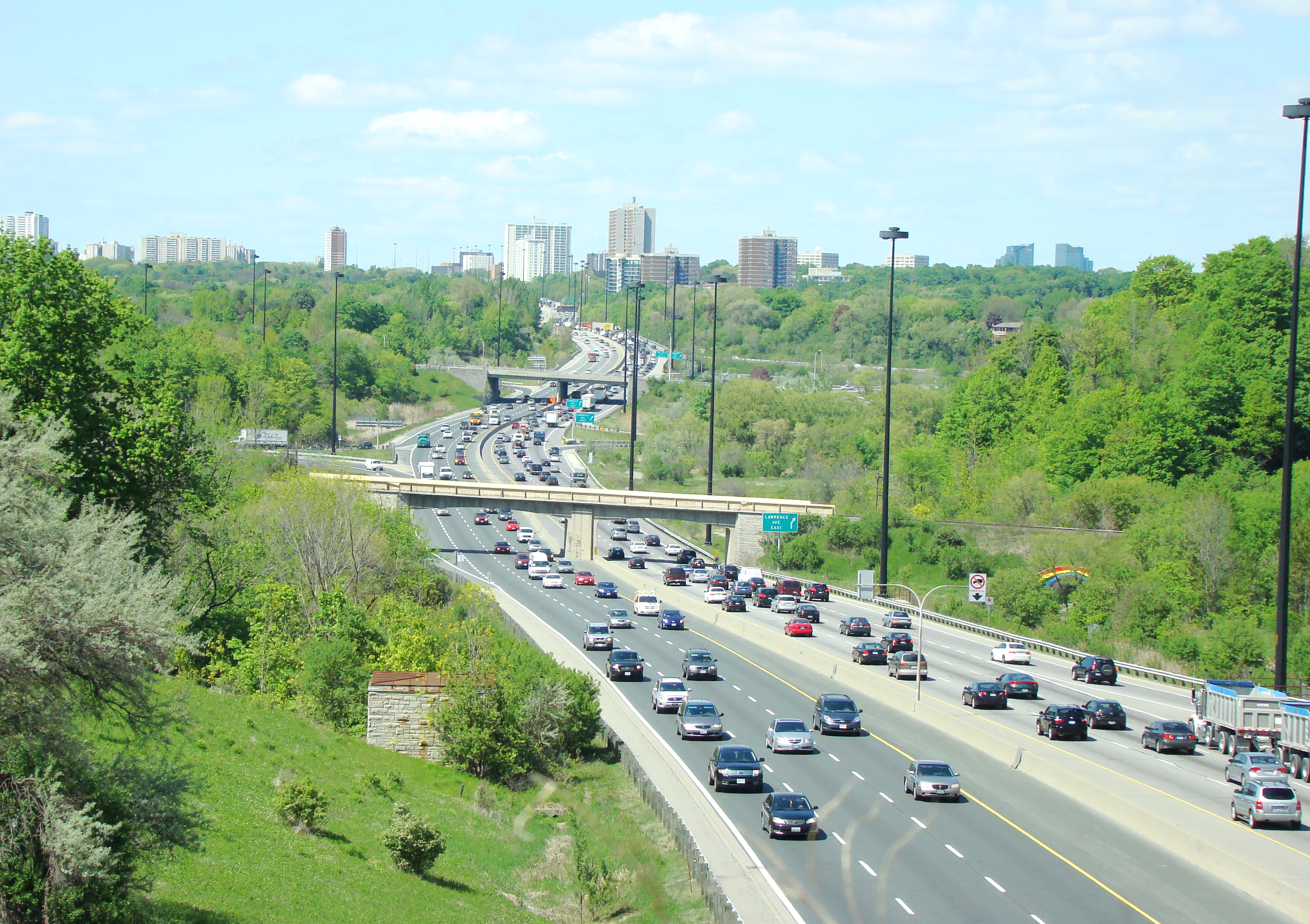
The parkway descends into Milne Hollow in the East Don Valley near Lawrence Avenue.

Besides modification of the natural landscape, the route required relocation and demolition of utilities and residences. Metro relocated 1.2 kilometres (0.75 mi) of CNR and CPR railway tracks in the section from Bloor Street to Chester Hill Road to make way for the parkway. The Todmorden sewage treatment plant, built in 1926, was also demolished. The route required the removal of five homes on Minton Place located above the valley to facilitate the cut of the valley hillside. Four were demolished and one moved to Scarborough.

Construction of the section from Eglinton Avenue to Lawrence Avenue began on July 1, 1961, and it was opened to traffic in the evening of October 30, 1963, without any ceremony. The segment connected to Woodbine Avenue north of Lawrence Avenue, cutting off access to Woodbine from Lawrence Avenue. Northbound parkway traffic could continue north on Woodbine Avenue, then a two-lane road, up to the interchange with Highway 401. The 2-kilometre (1.2 mi) section cost $2.723 million to complete.

The third section to open was from Bloor Street to the Gardiner Expressway. This section involved the removal of CPR rail sidings on the eastern bank of the Don from Eastern Avenue north. Royal Drive, which was a two-way road that connected with Bloor Street between Broadview Avenue and the Viaduct was re-purposed into a one-way north-bound on-ramp. A pedestrian overpass bridge was constructed to connect the east and west sections of Riverdale Park. The section opened in conjunction with the section of the expressway from the parkway to York Street on November 6, 1964. It was opened ceremonially by Ontario Premier John Robarts.

The Highway 401 / Don Valley Parkway interchange (which replaced an earlier interchange with Woodbine Avenue, and would link to the future Highway 404) under construction in 1965.

By 1965, concurrent with the expansion of Highway 401 into a twelve lane collector-express system, Woodbine Avenue's existing interchange with Highway 401 was being replaced by a new freeway-to-freeway interchange (similar to a Parclo A4 but modified with grade separations for free flow of traffic) for the upcoming extension of the parkway. The final section of the parkway, from Lawrence Avenue to Sheppard Avenue was opened chaotically to traffic in the afternoon on November 17, 1966, but forced drivers to exit onto Highway 401; construction inspectors were not aware that the parkway was scheduled to open until they arrived on site that morning. The section north of Highway 401 remained unopened until March 1, 1967, due to ongoing construction of the Sheppard Avenue bridge. The final cost of the project was $40 million ($375 million in 2025 dollars).

After passing underneath the Sheppard bridge, the parkway temporarily narrowed to the two-lane Woodbine Avenue, although Metro had plans to extend the parkway all the way to Steeles Avenue by removing the remainder of Woodbine Avenue. From Steeles Avenue onward, the Department of Highways (DHO) would continue the parkway as a "new King's Highway".

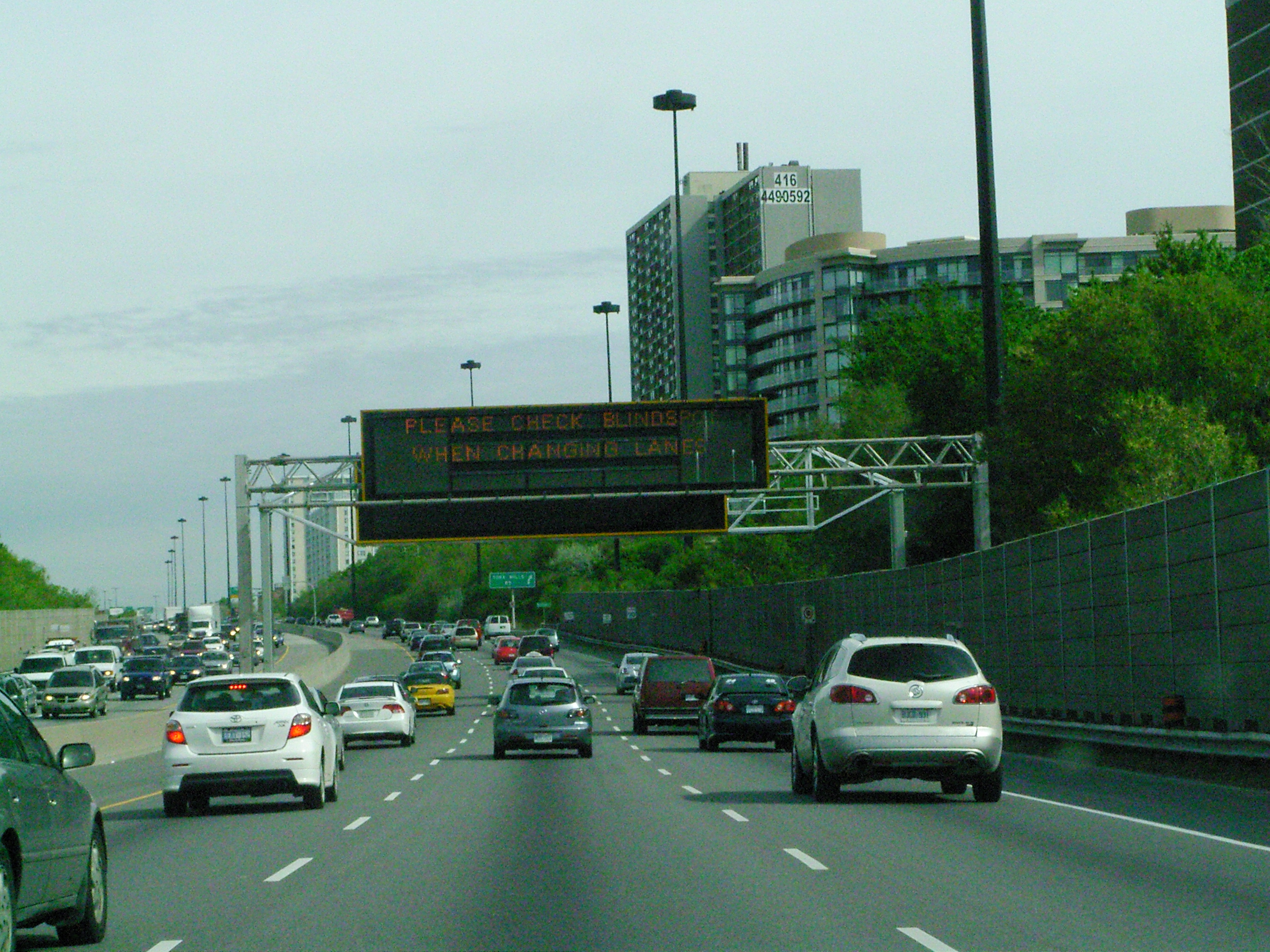
Changeable Message Sign (CMS) on northbound Don Valley Parkway approaching exit to York Mills Road. Part of the RESCU traffic management system, this older CMS is in the process of being replaced by a walk-in variation.

=== Since completion ===
In 1965, Metro Toronto Chief Coroner Morton Shulman released a report criticizing the lack of safety in the design of the parkway. In the first five months of 1965, there were 136 accidents on the parkway, with four deaths and 86 injuries. Among the "death-dealing" deficiencies that had to be corrected were inadequate guardrails, exposed steep slopes and light standards that were exposed to collision from passing high-speed traffic. Call boxes with emergency telephones were installed on the parkway in 1966. The boxes, attached to street lighting on the right shoulder, provided a direct line for help from the Ontario Motor League, now part of the Canadian Automobile Association (CAA). Today, the RESCU Traffic Management System monitors the highway and can call for emergency help.

On April 18, 1969, the slope behind Davies Crescent (just west of Don Mills Road) gave way after heavy rain, covering the northbound lanes and part of the southbound lanes with up to 90 centimetres (3 ft) of mud. There were only minor injuries. The slope, which had had its trees removed for the building of the expressway, was covered with sod and stakes to hold the soil.

When the province decided that the new Highway 404 should start at Highway 401 instead of the Metro boundary, it took control of the existing parkway between Highway 401 and Sheppard Avenue, as well as rebuilding the remainder of Woodbine Avenue within Metro Toronto to a freeway. The Sheppard Avenue interchange with the parkway was originally a Parclo AB2, plus Fairview Mall Drive at the time ran only east-west directly north of the shopping centre and also had its own on/off-ramps from the southbound lanes of Highway 404. In the 1980s the province removed the separate sets of Fairview Mall Drive and Sheppard Avenue ramps in favour of an on/off-ramp that fed directly to the shopping centre and an extension of Fairview Mall Drive whose eastbound lanes run south to meet with Sheppard Avenue.

In the late 1980s, a new partial-access interchange was built at Wynford Drive to provide access between the parkway and the Concorde Place development. The new partial-access interchange was paid for by the developers. The ramp connecting Wynford with the northbound parkway required a tunnel under the Canadian Pacific Railway (CPR) Midtown railway lines. To avoid delaying trains on the vital freight line, a prefabricated concrete arch was jacked into the embankment, 2 feet (0.61 m) at a time, over 12 days. This was the first North American use of such a technique.

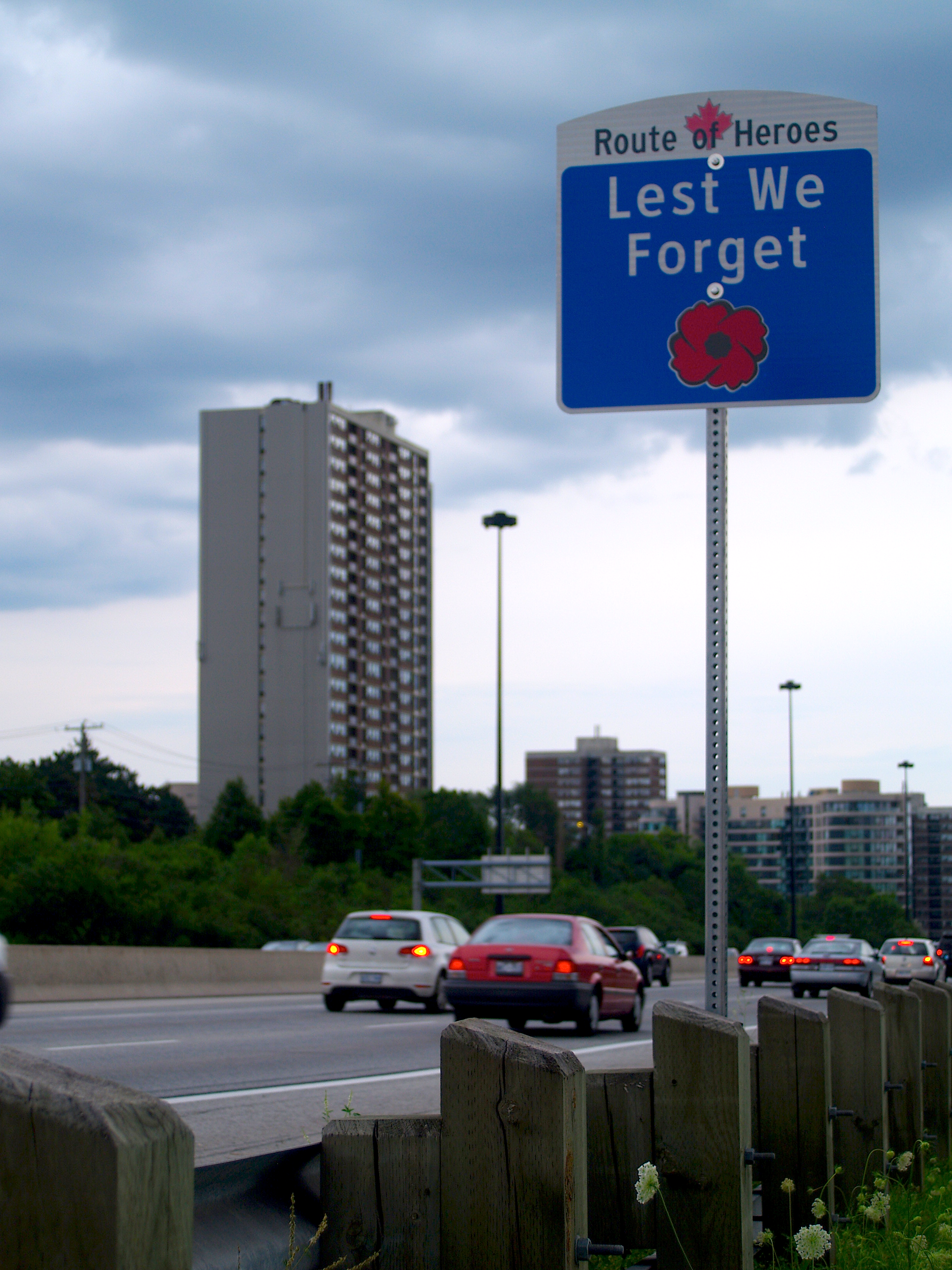
A Route of Heroes marker

From 1986 to 1988, the City studied traffic congestion in the 'Don Valley Corridor', an area from Leslie Street east to Victoria Park Avenue. To improve traffic in the area, the proposed solutions were extending Leslie Street south of Eglinton Avenue and south-west to Bayview Avenue; widening Don Mills Road; and expanding the parkway. Two proposals were put forward for approval: the Leslie Street extension and widening of Don Mills Road. Don Mills Road was widened from four to six lanes with the new lanes to be high occupancy/bus lanes. The Leslie Street extension was approved by East York and North York, but was abandoned by Metro Council in 1993, after the provincial government refused to subsidize its construction.

In 1989, a public meeting was held on the future of the Don River, which was widely known for its pollution, and the Don Valley, considered an "industrial wasteland" and which had seen its last industrial use (the Taylor, later Domtar, Paper Mill) close in 1982. The Toronto City Council formed the "Task Force to Bring Back the Don", an organization of volunteers to work on conservation efforts in the Don Valley. Since that time, the task force has planted some 40,000 trees in the valley, planted thousands of wildflowers and overseen the creation of wetlands along the river. Efforts continue to ameliorate the water quality of the river and improve the environment of the surrounding valley lands. These efforts can be seen in the "Crother's Woods" north of Bloor Street and the Chester Marsh just south of Bloor Street, alongside the parkway.

Located north of the Bayview/Bloor interchange, the Pottery Road underpass was rebuilt in 1994. It was over 30 years old and it required the replacement of columns and a restructuring of the deck. It was worn down due to the cumulative effect of heavy traffic and weather. The replacement necessitated the closure of several lanes of the parkway from April until the autumn that year.

In 2001, Toronto City Councillor Paul Sutherland proposed to add two toll lanes in each direction along the parkway, from Highway 401 to Eglinton Avenue. From Eglinton Avenue south, one lane in each direction would be added. The proposal was criticized by transportation experts such as Transport 2000 for encouraging driving to downtown. Sutherland estimated the cost of the proposal at $200 million.

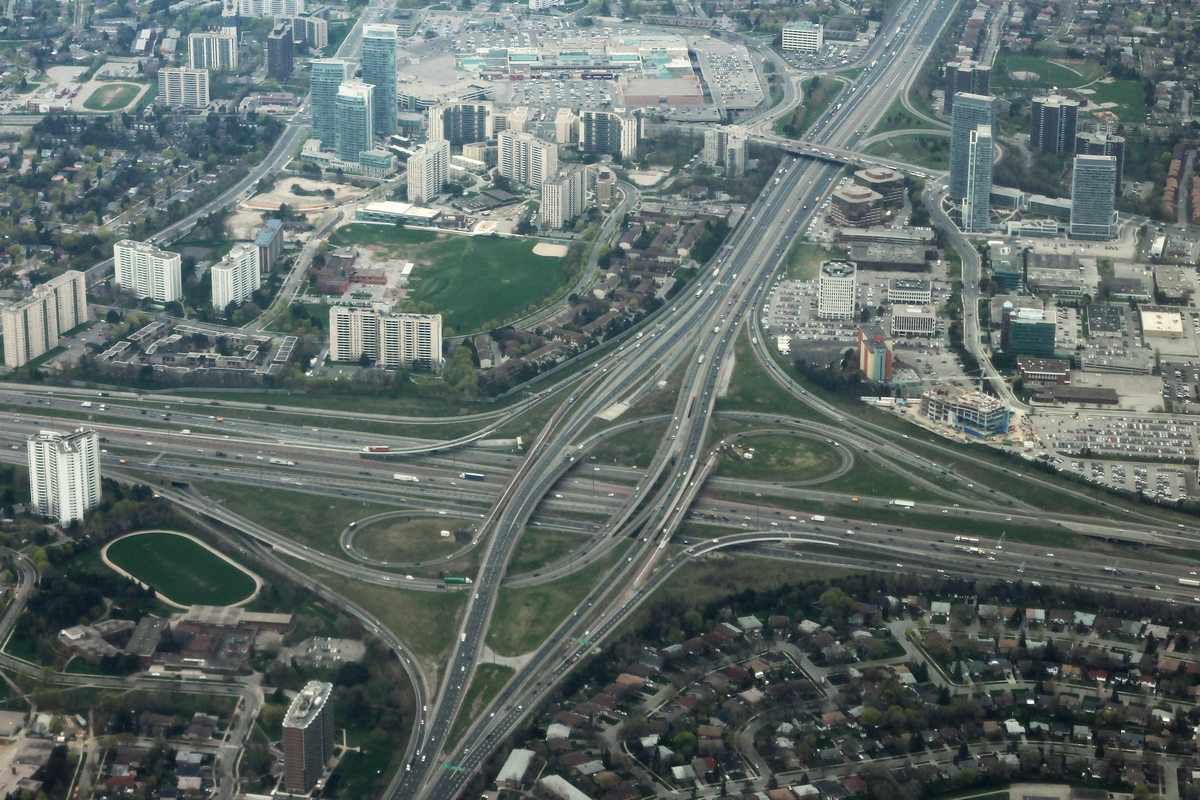
Aerial photograph of the Don Valley Parkway / Highway 404 / Highway 401 interchange

On May 11, 2007, GO Transit announced a plan to put dedicated bus lanes on the centre median of the parkway, to allow its buses to bypass traffic congestion and promote buses as an alternative to automobiles. The $12 million plan would be paid for by GO. The plan would require testing of soil conditions and an environmental assessment. GO Transit was taken over by the provincial Metrolinx transit agency, and the plan did not appear in the 2008 "Big Move" Regional Transportation Plan of Metrolinx. A second proposal, to allow GO Transit buses to use the left shoulder to pass slow traffic was approved in June 2010 by Toronto City Council. The centre median shoulders, starting with the section between Lawrence Avenue and a point 458 metres (1,500 ft) north of York Mills Road, are opened to GO Transit buses to pass other traffic, at no more than 20 km/h (12 mph) faster, when the other traffic is going at 60 km/h (37 mph) or less. These lanes opened to buses beginning September 7, 2010. City Council directed the General Manager of Transportation Services to report on the feasibility of future bus bypass lanes in the segments from Pottery Road to Don Mills Road and between Don Mills Road and Eglinton Avenue East.

On June 7, 2010, a section of the expressway was dedicated by former Toronto mayor David Miller as part of the Route of Heroes. Similar to the "Highway of Heroes" designation of a Trenton–Toronto portion of Highway 401, the designation serves to honour fallen Canadian soldiers. The designation applies to the portion of the parkway between Highway 401 and Bloor Street by which repatriation processions travel when transporting the remains of Canadian soldiers from CFB Trenton to the Office of the Coroner in downtown Toronto (but since September 27, 2013, all future repatriation travels to the new Centre of Forensic Sciences at Keele Street near Wilson Avenue)

The lower section of the roadway from the Gardiner Expressway to south of Gerrard Street East has been flooded by overflowing water from the Don River on more than one occasion. This section of the Parkway was closed in 1986, in 2010 and twice in 2013 due to flooding. The elevation of the highway had been designed to 1955 estimates for maximum flood levels.

The Don Valley Parkway is closed annually on the first Sunday in June for the Ride for Heart.

Heavy rainfall led to significant parts of the DVP flooded in July 2024.

== Future ==
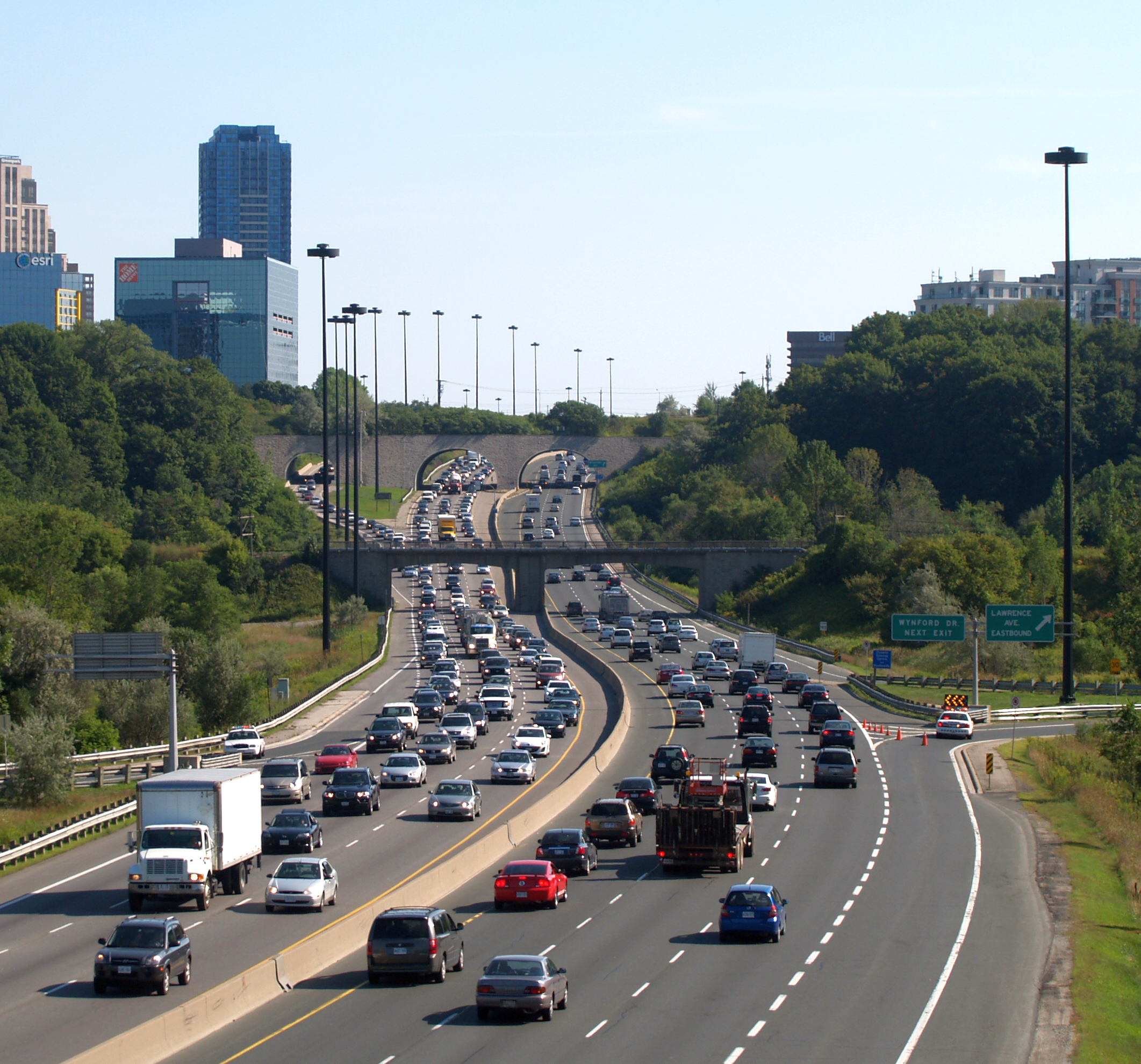
The parkway often fills to capacity, leading to slow travel speeds along much of its length throughout the day.

During the 2010 municipal election, mayoral candidate Sarah Thomson proposed a road toll for the Gardiner Expressway and Don Valley Parkway, drawing comments from critics and supporters across the city.

Two projects are underway that may change the parkway's southern end. Waterfront Toronto is conducting an environmental assessment to evaluate replacing, modifying or removing the Gardiner Expressway east of Jarvis Street. The parkway would then end at Lake Shore Boulevard. The City of Toronto eventually decided to keep the Gardiner–Don Valley Parkway connection, with revised ramps. A second proposal, known as the Don Mouth Naturalization and Port Lands Flood Protection project, seeks to recreate the natural mouth of the Don River into Toronto Harbour with the surrounding parkland. The project is managed by the Toronto and Region Conservation Authority and Waterfront Toronto. The ramps between the parkway and the Gardiner Expressway pass directly over the Don River channel.

A third project, the "Don River Valley Park" to link all of the open space from the Toronto Brick Works south to the harbour, has proposed changes that will impact the highway. The first is the replacement of the current Bayview–Bloor interchange roadways to free up green space. The second is the relocation of rail lines on the west bank of the Don River to the east bank. A third is a new land bridge over the highway joining the two sections of Riverdale Park.

In late 2016, the City of Toronto and mayor John Tory considered imposing a toll to use the highway, along with the Gardiner Expressway, to cover the maintenance costs of the highway and support public transit construction. However, the plan was rejected by the Ontario government.

In November 2023, the city and provincial governments announced a tentative deal which will see the Don Valley Parkway and the Gardiner Expressway uploaded to the province and maintained as provincial highways. Pending the completion of a due diligence review, the city and province indicate the transfer to be finalized by the end of 2025.

== Exit list ==
The 1955 announced route. It was built with a different connection to the Gardiner Expressway, rerouting slightly to the east at Eglinton and an added off-ramp at Eastern Avenue.

The following table lists the major junctions along the Don Valley Parkway. The entire route is located in Toronto. Exit numbers were installed during the annual spring maintenance on the weekend of April 22, 2017.

km	mi	Exit	Destinations	Notes
Don Valley Parkway continues west as the Gardiner Expressway
0.0	0.0	—	Lake Shore Boulevard via Don Roadway	Southbound exit and northbound entrance; formerly Highway 2
0.8	0.50	1	Richmond Street, Eastern Avenue – Downtown	Southbound exit and northbound entrance; Eastbound Eastern Avenue exits to northbound parkway, southbound parkway exits to Richmond Street/Eastern Avenue westbound
1.2	0.75	—	Queen Street	Northbound entrance
1.6	0.99	—	Dundas Street	Northbound entrance
2.7	1.7	—	Danforth Avenue	Eastbound Danforth to northbound parkway
3.8	2.4	3	Bayview Avenue, Bloor Street / Danforth Avenue	Formerly Highway 5; no access between Bayview and Bloor / Danforth; no access from eastbound Bloor to northbound DVP
7.0	4.3	7	Don Mills Road	No access to northbound parkway from southbound Don Mills; Signed as exits 7A (Don Mills Road southbound) and 7B (Don Mills Road northbound)
10.0	6.2	10	Eglinton Avenue	Partial cloverleaf interchange, was originally a full cloverleaf
10.7	6.6	11	Wynford Drive	Southbound exit and northbound entrance
11.8	7.3	12	Lawrence Avenue	Full cloverleaf interchange Signed as exits 12A (Lawrence Avenue eastbound) and 12B (Lawrence Avenue westbound)
14.0	8.7	14	York Mills Road	Partial cloverleaf interchange with no ramps on the northeast side; ramps on northwest side decommissioned and disconnected from DVP and York Mills Road
15.0	9.3	—	Highway 401	
Don Valley Parkway continues north as Highway 404 – Newmarket
1.000 mi = 1.609 km; 1.000 km = 0.621 mi

== In popular culture ==
The music video for the song "Subdivisions" by Canadian rock group Rush features scenes of the DVP. The second song of the album The Dream Is Over by the Canadian band PUP is named for the DVP.

== See also ==
- Ride for Heart
