= Freeway Traffic Management System =

COMPASS, also referred to as Freeway Traffic Management System, is a system run by the Ministry of Transportation of Ontario (MTO) to monitor and manage the flow of traffic (mostly on the 400-series highways) in Ontario.

COMPASS uses pairs of in-road sensors to detect the speed and density of traffic flow. This data is fed to a central computer at the MTO Downsview office and analyzed by operators, who also view the feeds of traffic cameras placed along the highways. Changeable Message Signs (CMS) then display messages to motorists on the highways, advising them of upcoming collisions, closures, detours and traffic flow.

== Algorithms ==
The primary algorithm used by the Ministry is known as the McMaster algorithm, designed by Professor Fred Hall of McMaster University, in Hamilton, Ontario. Incident Detection algorithms have also been widely used throughout the COMPASS-enabled area.

Research on new algorithm developments and evaluations is performed at the ITS Centre and Testbed (ICAT), at the Civil Engineering department of the University of Toronto. The ICAT is equipped with direct fibre-optic links to the Ministry of Transportation, and received both traffic camera and loop detector data on a live basis. Visual data can be used to confirm the presence of incidents detected by the various algorithms.

== COMPASS cameras ==
Images from most COMPASS cameras are available online via MTO website.

COMPASS has some dedicated cameras used by MTO Enforcement Officers to monitor and manage truck queues at locations such as the Putman Commercial Vehicle Inspection Station. Images from these cameras are not available online.

Highways with COMPASS cameras:

=== Queen Elizabeth Way (QEW) ===
(Fort Erie, Niagara Falls to St Catharines, Stoney Creek to Toronto)

- QEW from Thompson Rd to Bowen Rd (Fort Erie)
- QEW from Mountain Road to 7th Street (Niagara Falls to St. Catharines)
- QEW from Fifty Rd to Highway 427 (Stoney Creek to Toronto)

=== Highway 400 ===
(Toronto to King, Innisfil)

- Highway 400 from Highway 401 to near Highway 9 (Toronto-King)
- Highway 400 at Highway 89 (Innisfil)

=== Highway 401 ===
(Windsor to Tecumseh, London to Thames Centre, Woodstock, Cambridge to Puslinch, Milton to Clarington, Kingston, Ivy Lea). One of the highest-volume highways in the world

- Highway 401 from near Ojibway Pkwy to near 9th Concession Rd (Windsor-Tecumseh)
- Highway 401 from Wellington Road South to Putnam Rd (London-Thames Centre)
- Highway 401 from near Norwich Ave to near Highway 403 (Woodstock)
- Highway 401 from Homer Watson/Fountain St South to Highway 6 North (Cambridge-Puslinch)
- Highway 401 from near Martin St to Holt Rd (Milton-Clarington)
- Highway 401 from Gardiners Rd to Highway 15 (Kingston)
- Highway 401 from near Reynolds Rd to near Highway 137 (Ivy Lea)

=== Highway 402 ===
(Vyner to Sarnia)

- Highway 402 from Mandaumin Road to Front Street North (Sarnia)

=== Highway 403 ===
(Hamilton to Burlington, Oakville to Mississauga)

- Highway 403 from Aberdeen to QEW (Hamilton-Burlington)
- Highway 403 from QEW to Highway 401 (Oakville-Mississauga)

=== Highway 404 ===
(Toronto to York Region)

- Highway 404 from Highway 401/Don Valley Parkway to Stouffville Rd (Toronto-Whitchurch Stouffville)
- Highway 404 from Davis Dr to Queensville Sideroad (East Gwillimbury)

=== Highway 405 ===
- Highway 405 from QEW to Queenston-Lewiston Bridge (Niagara On The Lake)

=== Highway 406 ===
- Highway 406 South of QEW (St. Catharines)

=== Highway 407 ===
- Highway 407 from Brock Rd to Highway 35/115 (Pickering to Clarington)

=== Highway 409 ===
(Toronto)

- Highway 409 from Highway 427 to Highway 401 (Toronto)

=== Highway 410 ===
(Mississauga to Brampton)

- Highway 410 from Highway 401 to Queen St (Peel Region)

=== Highway 412 ===
- Highway 412 from Highway 401 to Highway 407 (Durham Region)

=== Highway 417 ===
(the Queensway, Ottawa)

- Highway 417 from Walkley Rd to Highway 7 (Ottawa Region)

=== Highway 418 ===
- Highway 418 from Highway 401 to Highway 407 (Durham Region)

=== Highway 427 ===
- Highway 427 from Evans Ave/Brown's Line to Major Mackenzie (Toronto-Vaughan)

=== Non 400-series Highways ===
- Highway 7/8 from Fischer-Hallman Rd to Homer Watson (Kitchener)
- Highway 58 from Pine Street to Thorold Stone Road (including Thorold Tunnel) (Thorold)
- Thorold Stone Road
- Adolphustown/Glenora Ferry Terminals
- Wolfe Island Ferry Terminals - Kingston and Wolfe Island (2)
- 1000 Islands Parkway - Ivy Lea
- E.C. Row Expressway - COMPASS uses images from City of Windsor.
- City of Windsor - Images from both City of Windsor and COMPASS are available on MTO website via COMPASS interface.

== False alarms ==
A false alarm for incident detection is not only highly undesirable, but seriously damages the confidence in the detection system. Therefore, a near 100% alarm accuracy is needed. This does not mean that 100% traffic parameter accuracy is required from the traffic sensors; however, the logical commands that analyze the change in traffic parameters need to be selected carefully in order to minimize the probability of false alarms yet detect all major incidents as well as a high percentage of all other incidents. Most importantly, confirmation of incident and evaluation of incident type by manual inspection of a video camera screen is probably the most significant incident detection technique.

== See also ==
- Electronic Monitoring and Advisory System - a similar type of system in Singapore
- Motorway Incident Detection and Automatic Signalling
- Road Emergency Services Communications Unit - system used on the Don Valley Parkway by the City of Toronto
- Hong Kong Intelligent Transport System (ITS) - uses same technology through Delcan International Corporation, designer of the Traffic Control System used by COMPASS
