= Cornell Community Centre & Library =

Community centre in Markham, Ontario

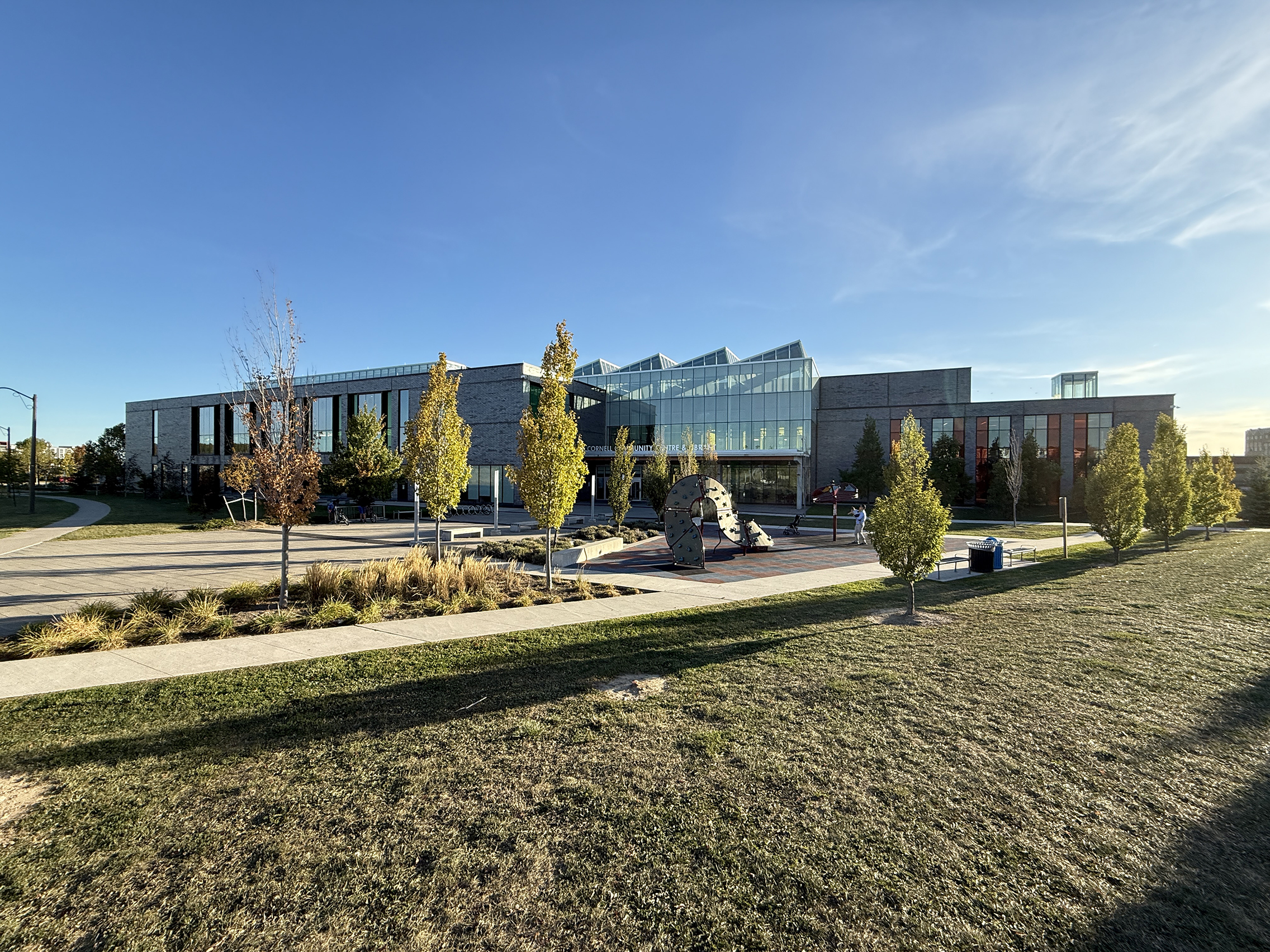
- Cornell Community Centre & Library
- Interactive map of Cornell Community Centre & Library
- Location: 3201 Bur Oak Ave, Markham, ON L6B 0T2
- Coordinates: 43.8844°N 79.22944°W
- Owner: City of Markham
- Operator: City of Markham

Construction
- Opened: December 17, 2012
- Architect: Perkins and Will
- Structural engineer: CH2M Hill

Website
- Cornell Community Centre

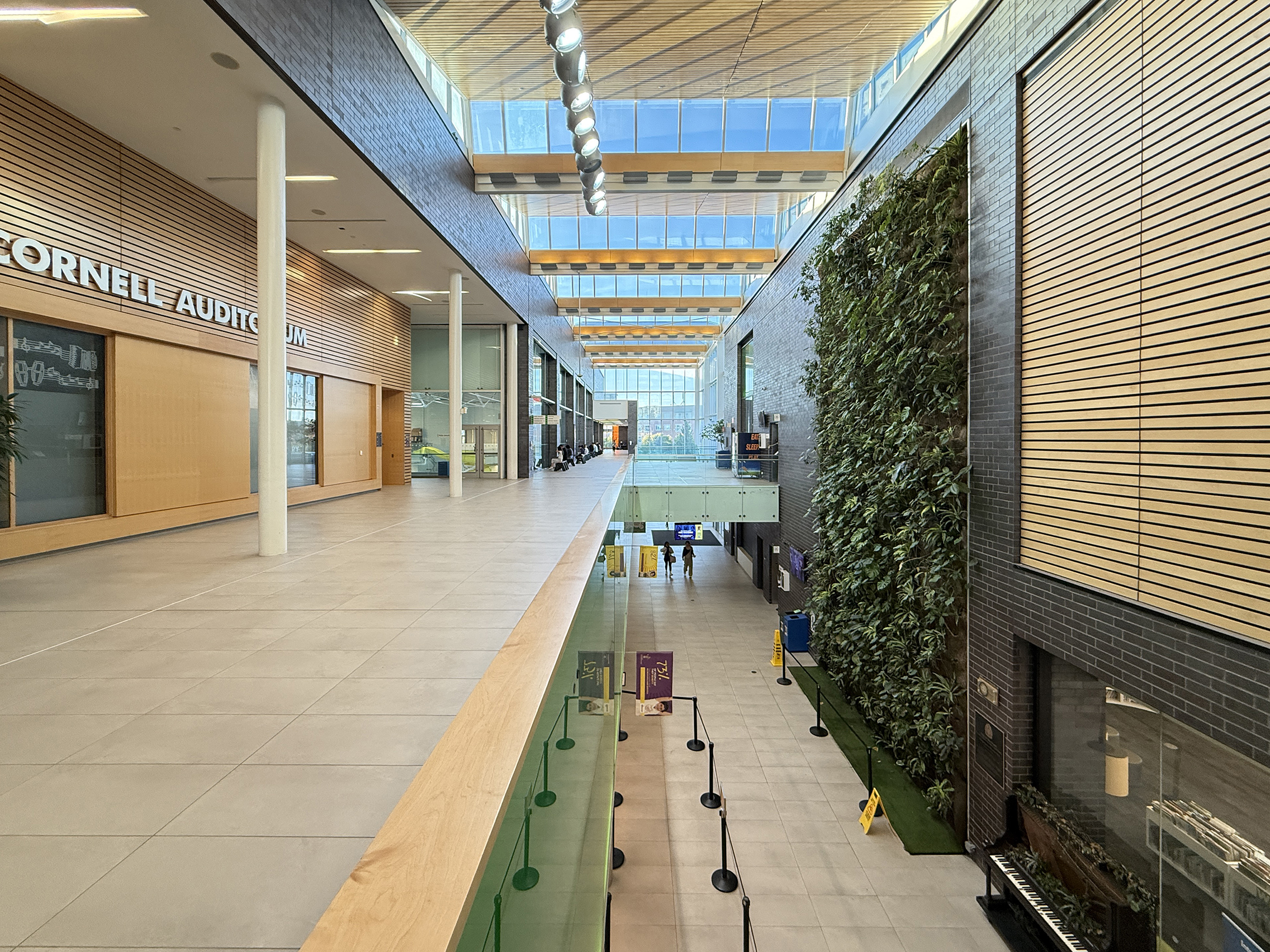
Lobby

Cornell Community Centre is a 129,000-square-foot centre, located at 3201 Bur Oak Ave, Markham, Ontario and centred within the community of Cornell. The community was designed to meet LEED Silver Certification. It is one of the newest community centres in the City of Markham. It was opened on December 17, 2012, and includes many features. The community centre is connected to Markham Stouffville Hospital, allowing many different facilities to be available for patients and doctors. The Library also has a section dedicated to health, diseases, and hospital usages on the second floor.

== Features offered ==
=== Indoor playground ===
There is a two-story indoor playground with slides, rock climbing wall, gym equipment for children, and more. Drop-in hours are available for parents to bring their children and advanced registration is not required. Parents are responsible for supervision of their children. The Indoor playground is available for rentals.

=== Rehearsal Hall ===
The rehearsal hall is what makes Cornell unique, as it is the only community centre with one. Seating 200 in a theatre format, this hall hosts performances and presentations, having surround sound, soundproof walls, and a projector screen available for use. The rehearsal hall is available for rentals.

=== Library ===
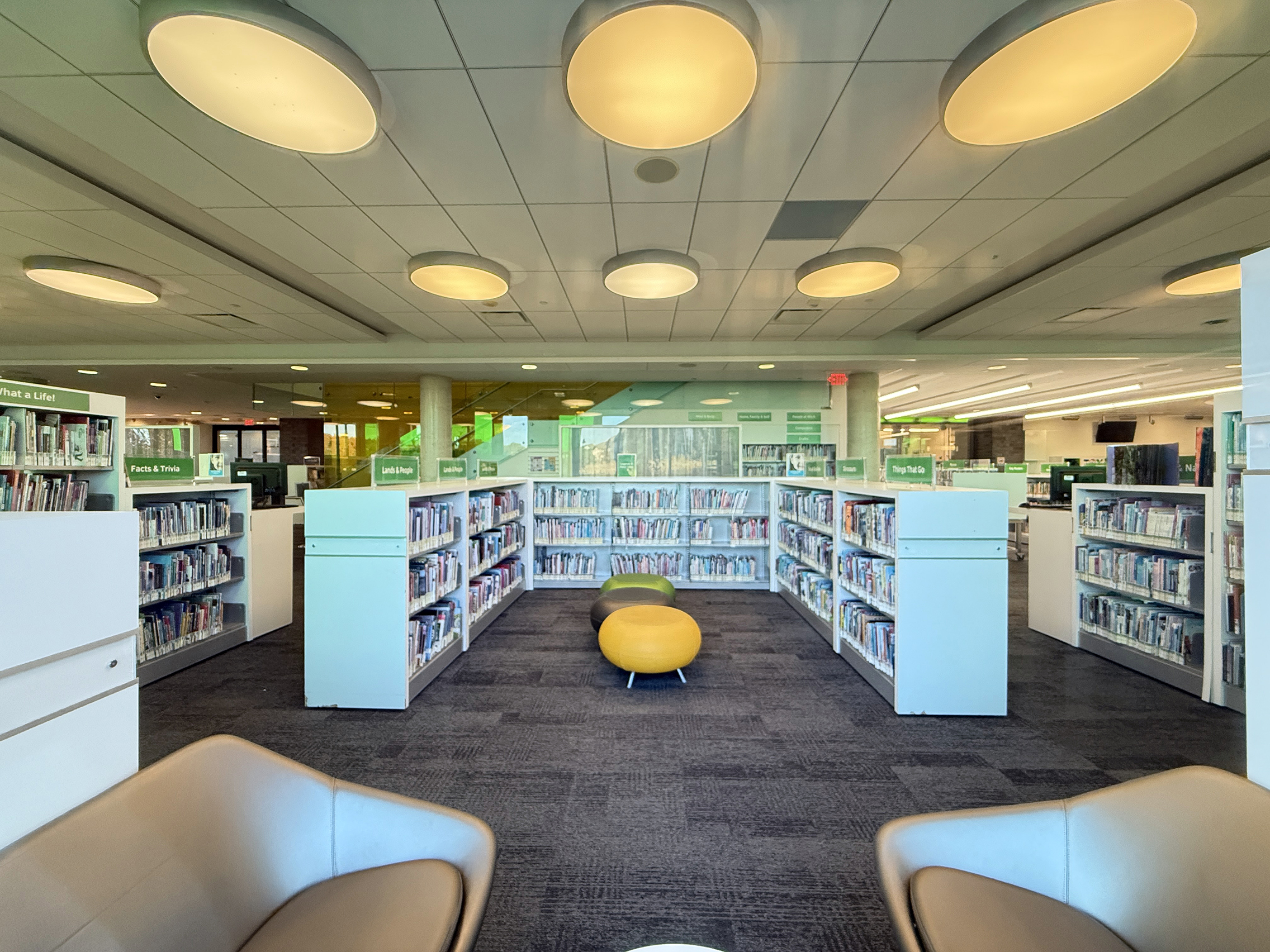
Markham Public Library-Cornell Branch

The Library has a vast variety of books, CDs, manga, magazines, movies, and audiobooks. Comfortable seating is available through the library, including: a fireplace lounge, café, and teen area (complete with video game amenities). Other features include a media wall and over a dozen study rooms. A designated area for children provides families with easy readers, kid-friendly movies, and educational toys. The library also offers more than 40 computers for use.

=== Swimming facility ===
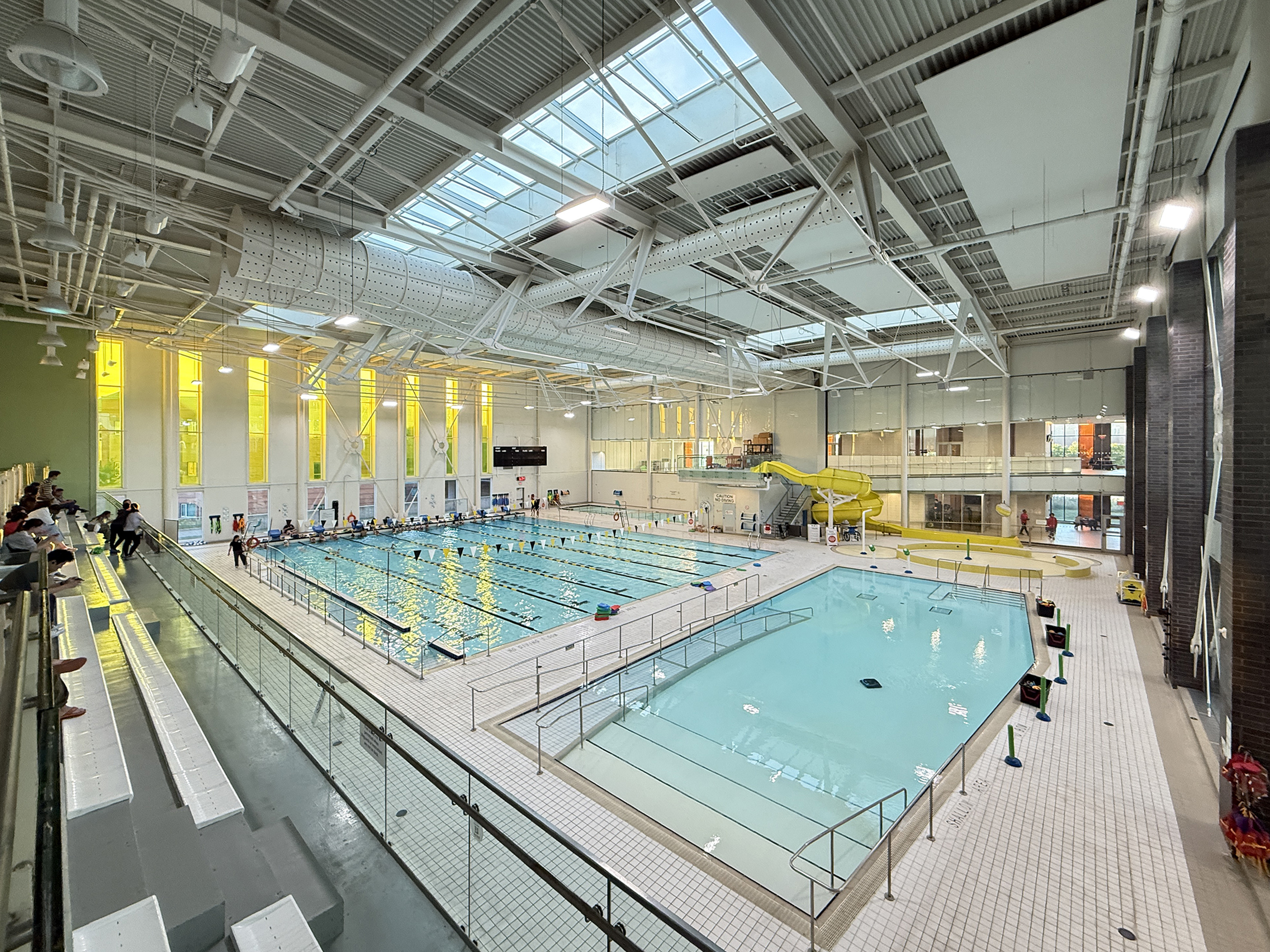
Cornell's 8 lane swimming and shallow water pools. The yellow water slide can be seen in the background.

Cornell Community Centre has three different pools. There is an 8-lane 25 meter pool, therapeutic pool, water slide, splash pad area, and shallow water pool. Many swimming competitions are held at this facility, including teams from all over the GTA. Pool rentals are also available for parties or private uses. There is an upper level open air observation deck.

=== Fitness centre ===
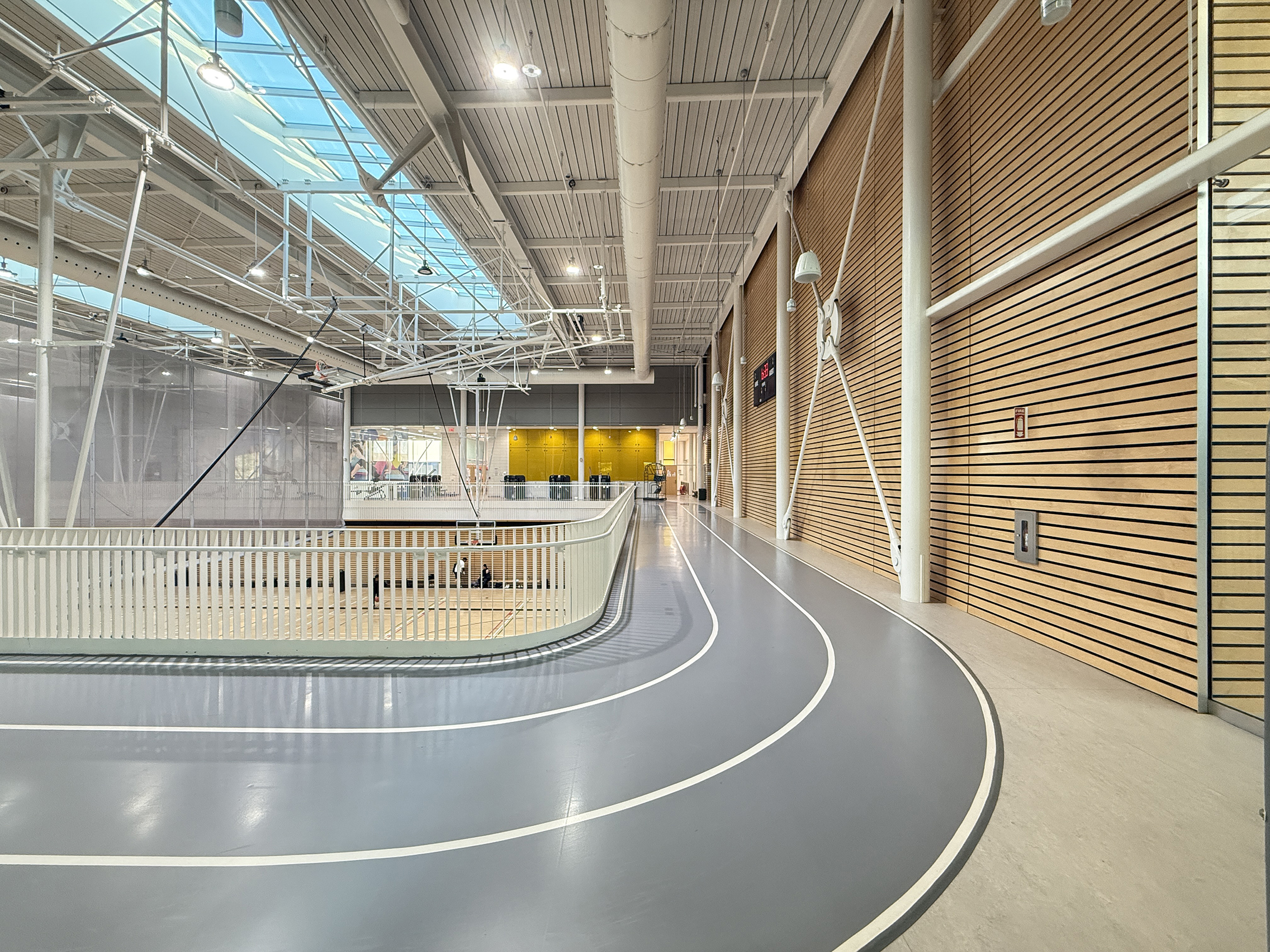
Indoor running/walking track

All members of the City of Markham's fitness centre are eligible to use any fitness centre in Markham, which includes Cornell, Thornhill, Centennial, and Markham Pan Am Fitness Centre. An indoor 400 meters running/walking track, dance studio, a huge variety of exercise machines, and free weights. Fitness members are provided with an inclusive change room complete with a sauna and hot tub.

=== Gymnasium ===
The gymnasium is a triple-sized gymnasium, consisting of one full and one half size basketball court. The gymnasium provides many programs, such as a variety of sports camps, drop in sports, presentations, and competitions. The Gymnasium is available for rentals. A drop cloth divider is used to split up the gymnasium when required.

=== Multi-purpose rooms ===
Within the centre, there are five rooms available: three multi-purpose rooms, an older adults room, and youth room. Different programs are run in these rooms, such as arts and craft, music, first-aid training, and more. In the youth room, youth are welcome to play many board games and video games as well as table tennis. All of these rooms are available for rental.

== Outdoor basketball court ==
Located between the building and the parking deck is a small basketball court. The basketball court is closed during the winter months.

== Rental information ==
Facilities that are available for rental include gymnasium, multi-purpose rooms, rehearsal hall, swimming pool, and indoor playground. These facilities are commonly used for parties, meetings, conferences, tournaments and more.

== See also ==
- Aaniin Community Centre and Library
- Milliken Mills Community Centre
- Angus Glen Community Centre
- Thornhill Community Centre
