= Greensborough, Markham =

Greensborough
- Neighbourhood
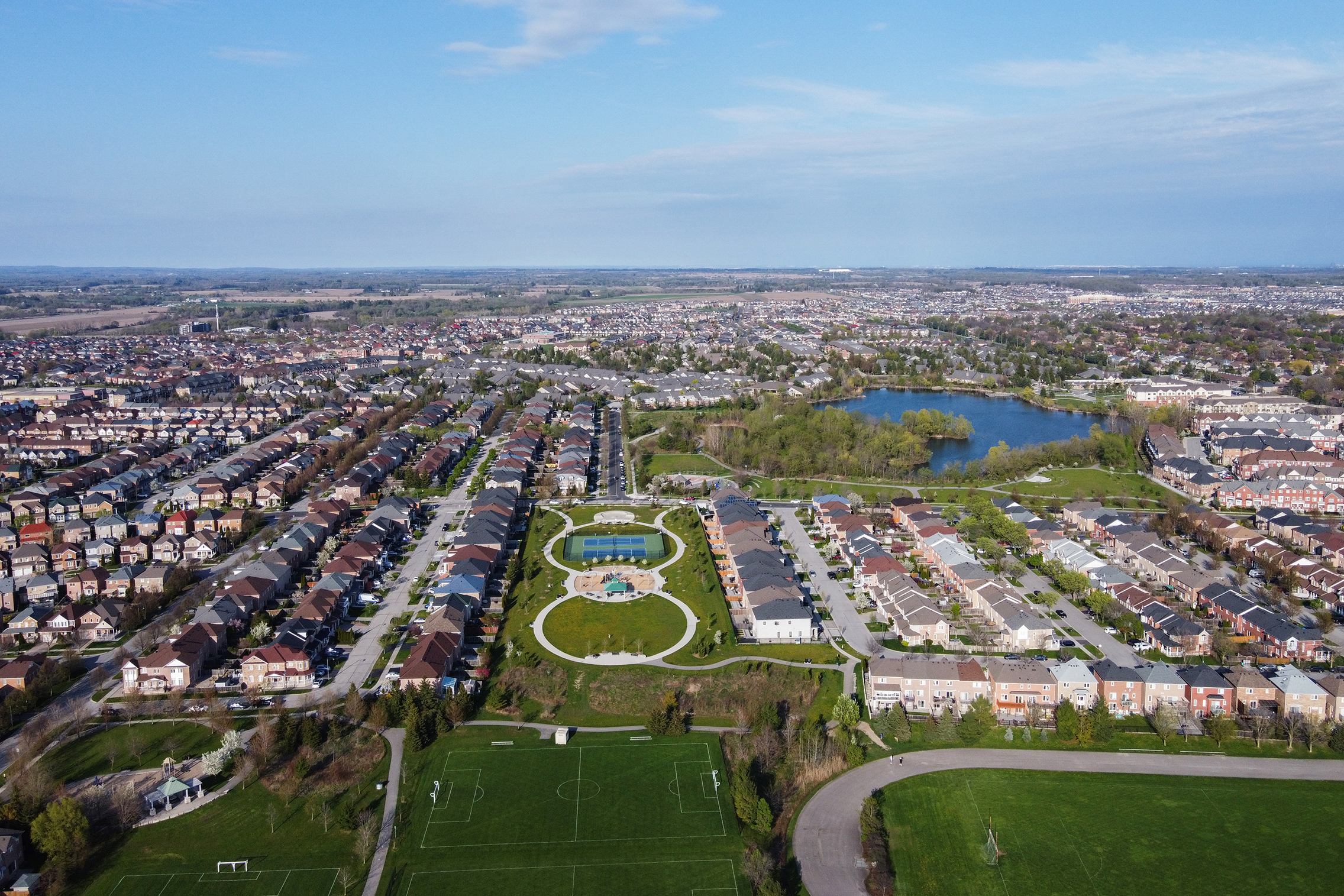
- Aerial view of Greensborough
- Interactive map of Greensborough
- Coordinates: 43°54′11″N 79°15′13″W
- Country: Canada
- Province: Ontario
- Regional municipality: York
- City: Markham

Government
  - MP: Paul Chiang (Markham— Unionville)
  - MPP: Billy Pang (Markham—Unionville)
  - Councillor: Karen Rea (Ward 4)

Population (2006 est.)
  - Total: 5,000
  - Density: 27/km^{2} (70/sq mi)
- Census Tract Number 5350403.03
- Postal code: L6E

Greensborough is a neighbourhood in the city of Markham in the Regional Municipality of York in the Canadian province of Ontario.

Greensborough is one of the easternmost communities in Markham and is situated just north of Markham Village (a heritage district along Main St. Markham that was the city's original downtown), west of Cornell, and east of Mount Joy. It includes the area north of 16th Avenue, west of Ninth Line, south of Major Mackenzie Drive and east of Markham Road. Parts of the neighbourhood's northern area are still undergoing development as of 2025.

== Demography ==
The community is part of census tract number of 5350403.03. Since this census tract is shared by three other communities within the City of Markham (Dickson Hill, Cashel, and Gormley) and extends into Richmond Hill and Whitchurch-Stouffville, the population of Greensborough is not exact, and can only be estimated. Greensborough is the most populous community within this census tract. The census tract has a total population of 5,414 and Greensborough specifically is estimated to have a population of somewhere between 4,500 and 5,000.

Canada census – Greensborough, Markham community profile

Population
Land area
Population density
Median age
Private dwellings
Median household income

== History ==
Historically, Greensborough had been a predominantly agricultural area surrounding the heritage sites of Mount Joy and Markham Village in the south. Most of the current development within the community began along with the completion of Donald Cousens Way in 2005. The community has adopted a Smart Growth model which involves both low and medium density residential development along with low-density commercial and considerable park space scattered throughout.

== Parks and Green Space ==
Within the boundaries of Greensborough, there are several notable forest lots and parks. The community encompasses part of the northern portion of one of the most renowned watershed parks in the greater Toronto Area Rouge Park. Another notable park is Swan Lake Park in the south central portion of the Community.

== Transportation ==
The community's major thoroughfare is Bur Oak Avenue, a 4-lane road which runs in a roughly east–west direction.

=== Public Transit ===
The community is well served by public transit. York Region Transit (YRT) serves the area through route 18 (east-west along Bur Oak Ave.), routes 85 and 4 (east-west along 16th Ave. and Major Mackenzie Dr., respectively), route 9 (north-south along Ninth Line) and route 102 (north-south, operated by the TTC through contract with YRT). Routes 9, 16, 18, and 25 terminate at Markham Stouffville Hospital in the east allowing passengers to connect to Viva (bus rapid transit) services. Route 102 terminates at Warden subway Station in the south allowing passengers to connect to TTC subway services in the City of Toronto. GO Transit offers commuter train and bus services through Mount Joy GO Station at Bur Oak Ave. and Markham Rd. on the western edge of the community; this service allows for long distance commutes to popular destinations such as York University and Union Station.

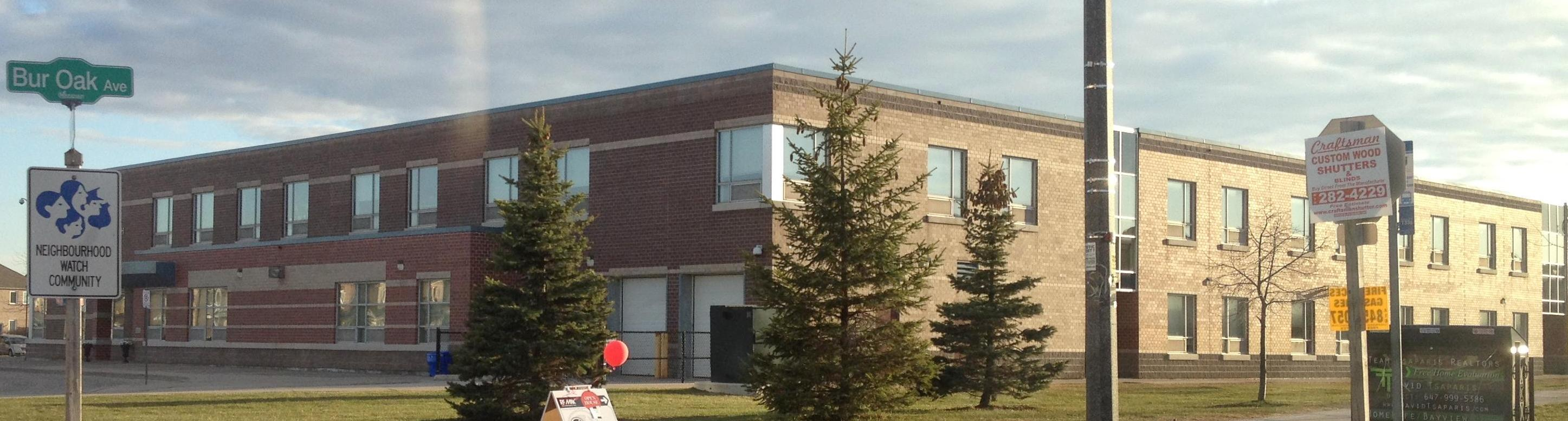
Greensborough Public School

== See also ==
- List of communities in Ontario
- Markham, Ontario
