= Armadale, Ontario =

Neighbourhood in Markham and Toronto, Ontario, Canada

Armadale
- Neighbourhood
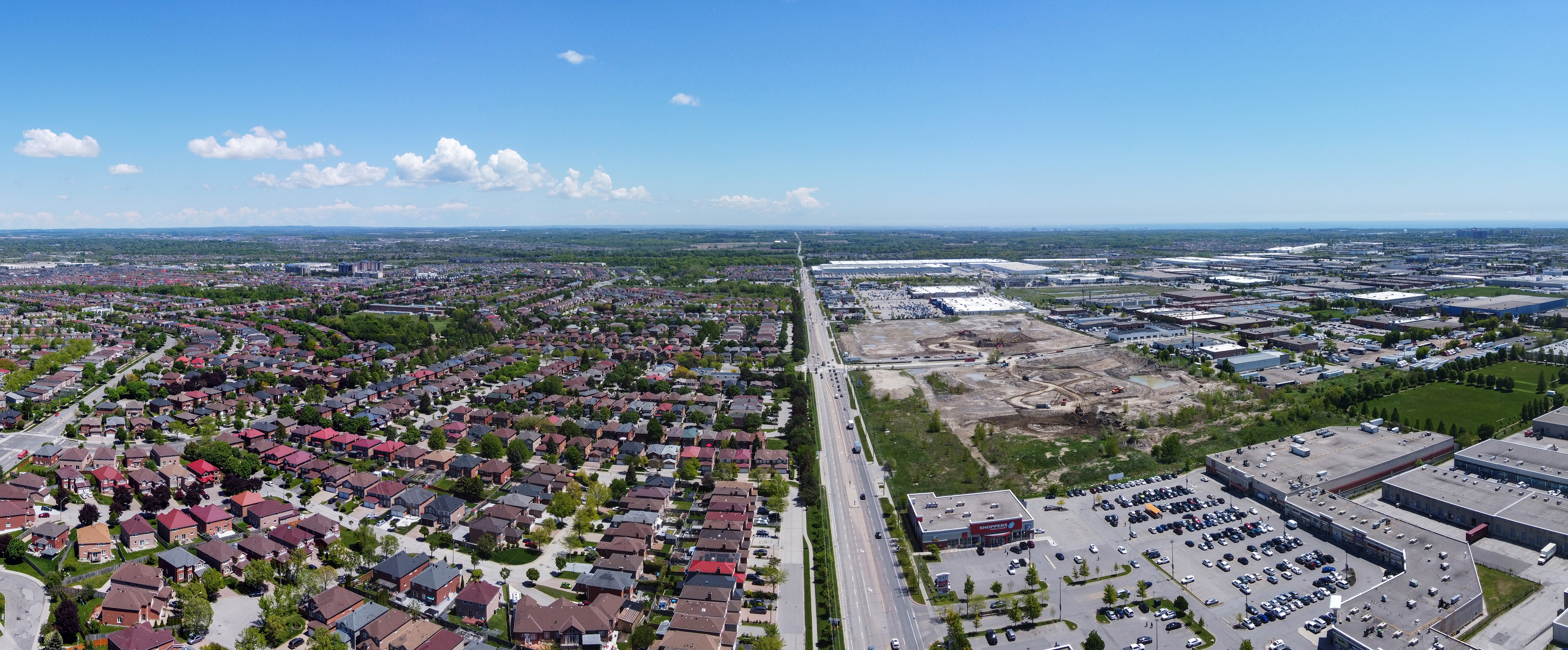
- Aerial view of Armadale, Ontario in 2025

- Location within Toronto
- Coordinates: 43°50′14″N 79°15′29″W
- Country: Canada
- Province: Ontario
- Cities: Markham (north of Steeles Avenue); Toronto (south of Steeles Avenue)
- Established: 1805
- Elevation: 176 m (577 ft)
- Time zone: UTC-5 (EST)
  - Summer (DST): UTC-4 (EDT)
- NTS Map: 030M14
- GNBC Code: FADQB

Armadale is a neighbourhood which overlaps the city of Markham, Ontario and the city of Toronto, Ontario, in Canada. The historical community is situated in the south-east of Markham and north-east of the former suburb of Scarborough, now part of Toronto.

== History ==
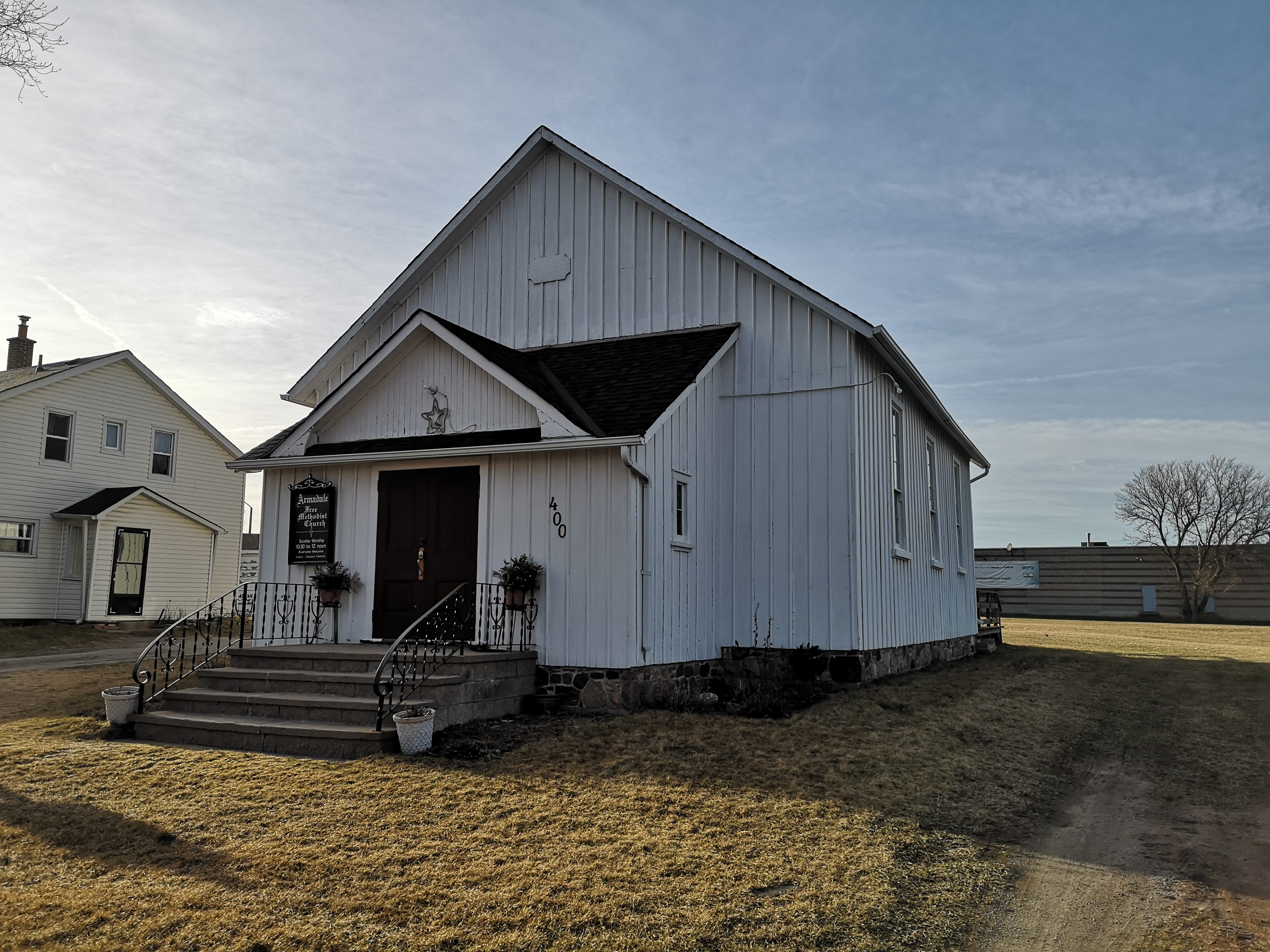
The Armadale Free Methodist Church was built in 1880.

Armadale's past began long before the first European settlers even reached the area. Archaeological initiatives spearheaded by the University of Toronto and the Royal Ontario Museum led to a wealth of First Nation artifacts like arrowheads and pottery being unearthed. On the west half of Lot 2 Concession 8, there is even a dark patch of soil that demarcates the position of an age-old Iroquois longhouse.

As early as 1805, United Empire Loyalist settlers moved into the region (Steeles Avenue and 8th Line). The community's name was first known as Magdala. A postal station was established in 1869 along what is now Passmore Avenue, but the name Magdala was not accepted and the post office became known as Armadale. It was aptly named after a small village near Edinburgh, Scotland.

Between 1840 and 1860, the hamlet thrived as a small mercantile center boasting two blacksmith shops, a hotel and a post office. The fortunes of the bustling community were brought to a premature end when the establishment of the Toronto and Nipissing Railway, built in 1871, which by-passed Armadale. When rural mail delivery was introduced in 1917, the community's post office was closed. Only the historic Armadale Free Methodist Church (1880), and several residential houses remains as a reminder of the hamlet's early settlement.

Other buildings in the small community included:

- blacksmith shop
- brick making yard
- several farms
- general store operated by the Beare Family
- Temperance hotel
- Tavern

In 1954, the communities south of Steeles Avenue was severed from York County, forming the Municipality of Metropolitan Toronto. As Armadale was situated along Steeles Avenue, it was split between the two county/regional governments. The portions of Armadale located south of Steeles Avenue became a part of Metropolitan Toronto, while the portion of the community north of Steeles Avenue remained a part of York County (reorganized into the Regional Municipality of York in 1971).

=== Urban development (1980–present) ===
The Markham portion of Armadale, north of Steeles Avenue was developed in the 1980s and 1990s as a residential community from farmland. This area of Markham is home to predominantly middle-income families. There is also a visible infrastructural decay of neighbourhoods located here.

South of Steeles Avenue, in the Scarborough portion of Armadale, The land has remained undeveloped with many abandoned farms and apple orchards. Small industrial and commercial parks were built in the area. There are many businesses and factories along Passmore Avenue. A plaza, once contained a T & T Supermarket (now Field Fresh Supermarket) along with many shops catering to Asian customers, was recently opened to the east of the farm along Middlefield Road and Steeles Avenue. Along Steeles Avenue east of Markham was a small farm selling vegetables with industrial parks lining the south part of the farm, however, this farm will soon disappear as a new Asian-oriented shopping centre will be built on the property.

== Education ==
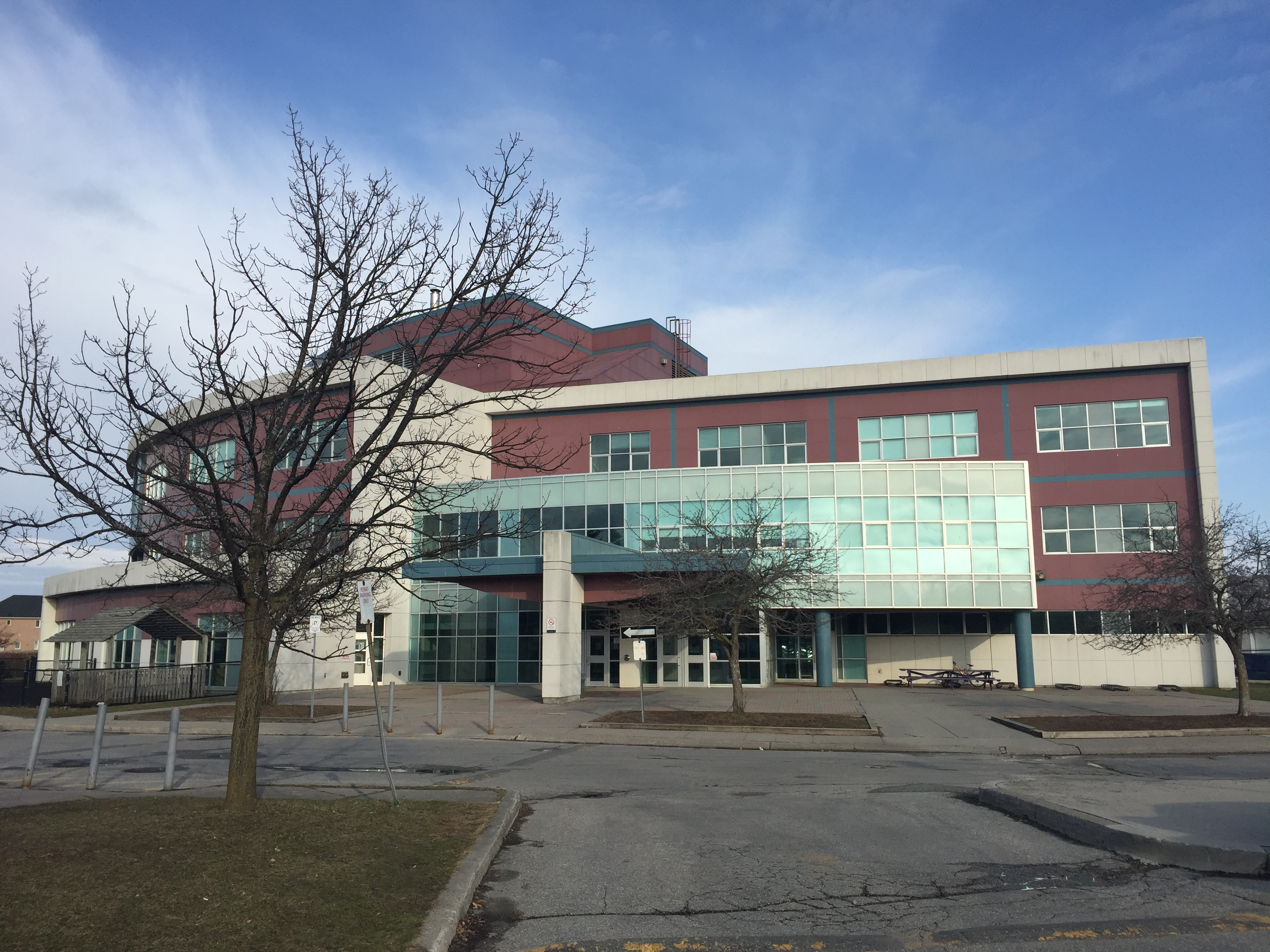
Middlefield Collegiate Institute is one of two public secondary schools located in Armadale.

Two public school boards operate schools in Armadale. The York Catholic District School Board (YRDSB), and the York Region District School Board (YRDSB). The former is a separate public school boards, whereas the latter is a secular public school boards. YCDSB and YRDSB operates several schools in Armadale, as well as provide schooling for those residing north of Steeles Avenue.

YCDSB and YRDSB operates each operate a secondary schools in Armadale. Middlefield Collegiate Institute is a secondary school operated by YRDSB, whereas Father Michael McGivney Catholic Academy is operated by YCDSB. The two school boards operate several public elementary schools in the Markham portion of Armadale, including:

- Armadale Public School (YRDSB)
- Cedarwood Public School (YRDSB)
- Coppard Glen Public School (YRDSB)
- Markham Gateway Public School (YRDSB)
- Ellen Fairclough Public School (YRDSB)
- St.Vincent de Paul CES (YCDSB)

Schools operated by the Toronto District School Board (TDSB) and Toronto Catholic District School Board (TCDSB) also serve students residing in portion of Armadale south of Steeles Avenue. However, neither school board maintains a school in Armadale. TCDSB and TDSB students residing in Armadale, would also attend TCDSB and TDSB based in Agincourt, and Milliken.

Two public school boards provide schooling for all residents of Armadale, on both sides of Steeles Avenue, Conseil scolaire Viamonde (CSV), and Conseil scolaire catholique MonAvenir. The two school boards operate French first language institutions throughout Greater Toronto, the former operating public secular schools, the latter operating separate schools. However, neither school boards operate institutions in Armadale, with CSV/MonAvenir students attending schools in adjacent neighbourhoods.

== Recreation ==
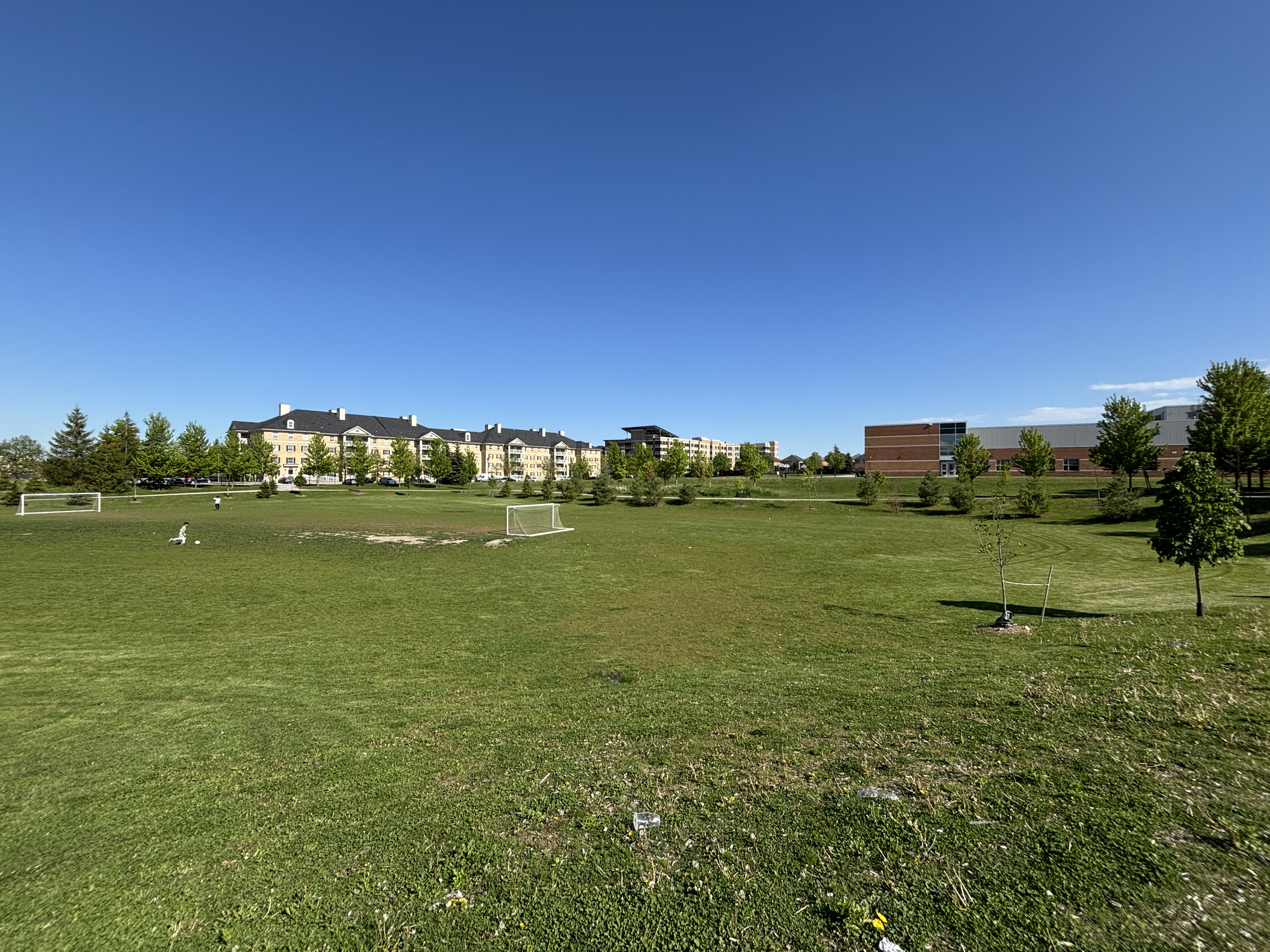
Peace Park

Public recreational facilities in Amadale include Armadale Community Centre, a small multi-purpose facility on Denison Street west of McCowan Road. Built in the early 1990s, the facility has community rooms, small gym as well as outdoor tennis courts (used by Armadale Tennis Club), two soccer pitches and a baseball field. Aaniin Community Centre is a large multi-purpose facility on 14th Avenue east of Middlefield Road. Opened in 2018, the facility has community rooms, gyms, indoor pool and library.

Other amenities in Armadale include:

- Armadale Tennis Club - Markham
- Beaupre Park - Markham
- Elson Park - Markham
- Featherstone Park - Markham
- James Edward Park - Markham
- Milliken Crossing Plaza - Scarborough
