= Donald Cousens Parkway =

Arterial bypass of Markham

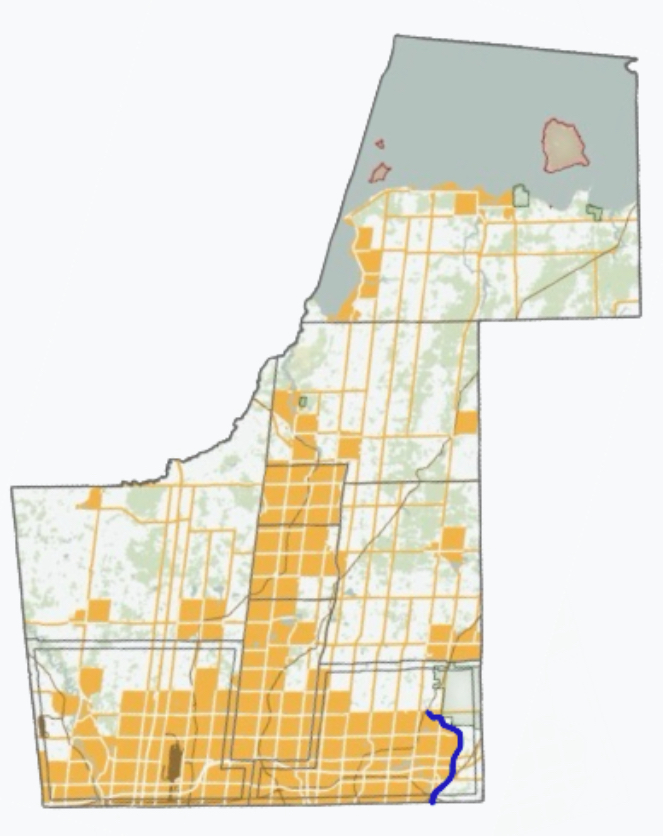
- Route of Donald Cousens Parkway in York Region (blue line).
- Length: 11.8 km (7.3 mi)
- Location: Markham (Cornell; Box Grove)
- South end: Steeles Avenue
- Major junctions: Box Grove By-Pass; 14th Avenue; 407 ETR / Highway 7 Ninth Line; 16th Avenue
- North end: Major Mackenzie Drive

Construction
- Inauguration: 2004

Donald Cousens Parkway or York Regional Road 48, also referred to originally as the Markham Bypass or Markham Bypass Extension, is a regionally-maintained arterial bypass in Markham, Ontario, Canada. Named for former Markham mayor Don Cousens in April 2007, the route bypasses Markham Village (the original, historic downtown of Markham) and the preserved hamlet of Box Grove, it initially travelled northward from Copper Creek Drive, south of Highway 407, to Major Mackenzie Drive (York Regional Road 25). A southern extension to tie into Ninth Line (itself bypassing Box Grove) north of Steeles Avenue was later completed. In addition to its role of redirecting through-traffic around the two communities, the road serves as the boundary between the urban area of Markham and the protected Rouge National Urban Park to the north and east.

Construction of the route began in 2002 north of 16th Avenue. In 2004, an interchange with Highway 407 was constructed along with a connection north to Highway 7. Both segments and the interchange were opened by December of that year. The following year, construction began to connect these two segments as well as on the Box Grove Bypass along Ninth Line; the former opened in October 2006 and the latter in the spring of 2007. Construction of the most recently opened segment, connecting the Box Grove Bypass to the interchange with Highway 407, began in 2009. It opened after several delays in 2012 and included a realignment of 14th Avenue.

Donald Cousens Parkway and a planned connection with Morningside Avenue in Toronto form an "East Metro Transportation Corridor", originally envisioned by the province in the 1970s as a six lane municipal expressway. During the mid-1990s, the Ministry of Transportation of Ontario (MTO) conducted studies and identified the need for the corridor by 2011. Although York Region had intended for a continuous alignment, Toronto City Council has opposed the direct connection between Morningside and Donald Cousens Parkway. As a result, it is now proposed to connect Morningside Avenue and Donald Cousens Parkway via a widened Steeles Avenue and extend Morningside to Steeles further west near Tapscott Road.

== Route description ==
Donald Cousens Parkway is intended to take both north-south through traffic and traffic travelling between the perpendicular Highways 7 and 48 off Main Street (with the bypassed sections of both highways today being York Regional Roads 7 and 68 respectively) and Ninth Line, with signage suggesting drivers use the parkway as a through route to bypass Markham Village. As trucks are prohibited along Main Street, signage directs them onto the parkway.

The road begins north of Steeles Avenue East, which serves as the boundary between Markham and Toronto. A two-laned Ninth Line curves northeast after crossing and being crossed by two separate railway tracks (the Canadian Pacific (CP) Havelock Subdivision and the Canadian National (CN) York Subdivision) and becomes Donald Cousens Parkway, expanding to four lanes and travelling along the eastern fringe of the community of Box Grove, alongside which it was built in the mid-2000s. On the west side is a new residential subdivision, while on the east side beyond the CP Havelock subdivision, which the road parallels, is the completely undeveloped Bob Hunter Memorial Park. After passing Box Grove Bypass, where for some time the route ended, the road also becomes known as Box Grove Collector Road (BGCR). The route intersects 14th Avenue (York Regional Road 71) and continues as before, eventually curving north and meeting Copper Creek Drive while departing from the railway tracks and park. It passes a supercenter before an interchange with Highway 407, where it crosses over the toll route.

No longer known by the BGCR name, the route meanders north, slowly edging east towards Reesor Road and now surrounded by undeveloped greenspace. It encounters Highway 7, north of which it becomes a divided roadway travelling on the eastern edge of Cornell as well as parallel to and alongside Reesor Road. Approaching and intersecting 16th Avenue, the road makes a broad sweeping curve northwest, continuing to serve as the boundary of urban development in Markham. It narrows to a two lane road, with adjacent land along the northern side prepared for future northbound lanes, before encountering Ninth Line again. Quickly curving north then east, sandwiched between the neighbourhood of Greenborough and Little Rouge Creek, the route makes a final curve north to end at Major Mackenzie Drive on the northern edge of urban development in eastern Markham.

A future extension, will carry Donald Cousens Parkway north, crossing over the Stouffville GO Train line on a new bridge and merging into the current southern terminus of Highway 48. As a result of this, Highway 48 and Donald Cousens Parkway (York Regional Road 48) will become the through route while Main Street will meet them at an intersection demarcating the two.

== History ==
=== Planning ===
The history of Donald Cousens Parkway dates back to the 1970s when Metropolitan Toronto and the Ontario Department of Highways, (now the Ministry of Transportation of Ontario or MTO) planned out the East Metro Transportation Corridor. This corridor was originally envisioned as a six-lane expressway connecting Highway 401 with the planned but unbuilt Highway 407 to service the future planned suburbs of Cornell and Seaton using the greenspace between the two. However, the drive for expressway construction faded through the 1970s and 1980s as a result of opposition and the resulting cancellation of the Toronto expressway network. Studies nonetheless continued to be performed confirming the need for the route. The formation of Rouge Park in 1990 resulted in a commitment for "no new roads" through the park south of Steeles Avenue, ending the potential for any expressway proposals to be approved.

Before Donald Cousens Parkway was constructed, a short bypass of Markham Village, named the Markham By-pass, running north from Highway 7 and curving west to interline with 16th Avenue, running through what is today the Cornell neighbourhood, and – according to early plans for the development – initially intended to form a permanent through route alongside the future bypass, was built.

During 1994 and 1995, the MTO conducted two studies termed the Morningside Transportation Corridor Review. While the study once again confirmed the need for the route, it also suggested that while an expressway was the ideal solution, an arterial road would be the practical solution. It also suggested that the road be a municipal route, rather than a provincial one. In 1997, the Environmental Assessment for the Markham Bypass extension was completed, approving construction of an interchange at the future Highway 407 (then open only as far east as Highway 404) and a divided roadway north from there to Major Mackenzie Drive.

=== Construction ===
Construction on the two lane section between 16th Avenue and Major Mackenzie Drive, connecting with the north end of the original Markham By-pass, began in 2002, and was completed by the end of 2004. Phase 2, which included construction of a partial interchange with Highway 407, began in 2004 and was completed by the end of the year; it and the four lane section north of it to Highway 7 opened on December 17, 2004. In 2005, construction began on the third phase of the bypass, connecting the southern segment at Highway 7 with the northern segment north of 16th Avenue. This four lane section opened on October 24, 2006. The two lane road tying into the original Markham By-pass was bypassed by this new section leading to 16th Avenue and subsequently closed and removed. The old Markham By-pass was retained until the mid-2010s, until it was severed and incorporated into parts of two new separate streets within Cornell as it developed. Phase 1 cost an estimated $19.3 million; phase 2 an estimated $5.5 million; phase 3 an estimated $10.8 million.

On October 19, 2006, York Regional Council voted to rename the Markham Bypass to honour the work of mayor Don Cousens. Following this decision, a report was prepared outlining the costs; it was presented to council on February 22, 2007, and a bylaw enacted. The name change became effective April 1, 2007.

South of Highway 407, planning for the controversial link to Morningside Avenue has been underway since 2002. Although York had intended for Donald Cousens Parkway to tie directly into Morningside, thus completing and arterial link the Highway 401, Toronto has firmly opposed this direct link since 2005 due to the requirement for a new crossing of the Rouge River. After a lengthy and contentious debate between the two, the province brought in former York Region CAO Alan Wells as a mediator in 2007. In September 2010, York announced that it had reached a compromise to construct a discontinuous route, with Donald Cousens Parkway ending at the current Steeles Avenue / Ninth Line intersection, widening the two-laned Steeles to six west of that point, and extending Morningside north to Steeles immediately east of Eastvale Drive. The Regional Municipality of York applied for and obtained environmental assessment approval for this undertaking in July 2011 and January 2013, respectively. In July 2014 it was announced that Toronto and York would begin sharing jurisdiction over 1.5 km (0.93 mi) of Steeles west from Ninth Line in order to move forward on the planned widening project.

In the interim period since the debate erupted in 2005, York Region and the Town of Markham began collaboration on linking Donald Cousens Parkway between Steeles and Highway 407. Markham oversaw construction of the Box Grove Bypass (or Ninth Line Bypass) and Town Arterial Road, (or Box Grove Collector Road), with construction carried out by it and the developers of the adjacent Box Grove community. The Box Grove Bypass was constructed by the town beginning in 2005 and opened in the spring of 2007, partially utilizing the Donald Cousens Parkway alignment along the north side of the CP Havelock railway subdivision. Construction of the Box Grove Collector Road, between the Box Grove Bypass and Highway 407, began in 2009 and included a realignment of 14th Avenue. The developers of the surrounding communities – Box Grove Hill Developments Inc. to the north of 14th Avenue and Box Grove Developers Group to the south – were contracted to build this section, which was scheduled for completion by December 2010. Although a short portion between Copper Creek Drive and Highway 407 — including the unfinished ramps at the interchange — was opened by 2011, the remainder of the project was delayed by issues involving a new railway crossing along 14th Avenue. It opened in 2012 at an estimated cost of $15.5 million.

== Future ==
The original intention of the Markham Bypass was to link Highway 48 with Highway 401 via the Morningside Avenue extension through Toronto. York Region planned for a continuous connection between the bypass and Morningside, meeting Steeles Avenue west of its intersection with Ninth Line. However, Toronto resisted, citing the environmental effects that would come from two new crossings over the Rouge River. As such, a discontinuous alignment was planned as a compromise beginning in 2010. Although the Steeles Avenue widening has a construction schedule with construction planned to start in 2020, no timeline or construction schedule for the extension of Morningside north of Oasis Boulevard has been determined.

Donald Cousens Parkway will be extended north from Major Mackenzie Drive to tie in with Highway 48, becoming the through-route in the process and completing the Markham Bypass. Poor soil conditions at a planned overpass of the Stouffville GO Train line have required several years of ongoing soil consolidation, beginning in July 2012 and scheduled for completion in the fall of 2017. Construction was set to begin in April 2018, but was later deferred to 2026 for budgetary reasons.

== Major intersections ==
The following table lists the major junctions along Donald Cousens Parkway. The entire route is located in Markham, Ontario, within the Regional Municipality of York.

km	mi	Destinations	Notes
0.0	0.0	Steeles Avenue East	Signed as 9th Line south of railway crossing
1.8	1.1	Box Grove Bypass	
2.4	1.5	Regional Road 71 (Fourteenth Avenue)	
3.1	1.9	Copper Creek Drive	
3.8	2.4	Highway 407 – Brampton, Pickering	A4 parclo, but missing ramps from northbound Donald Cousens onto Highway 407. The ramp from northbound Donald Cousens onto the eastbound of Highway 407 is expected to be constructed between 2022 and 2026.
4.7	2.9	Highway 7 east – Whitby; Regional Road 7 west – Vaughan	Road runs parallel with Reesor Road north of Riverlands Avenue and south of 16th Avenue.
6.9	4.3	Regional Road 73 (Sixteenth Avenue)	
8.8	5.5	Regional Road 69 (Ninth Line) – Stouffville	
10.6	6.6	Regional Road 25 (Major Mackenzie Drive)	Current northern terminus
11.8	7.3	Highway 48	Future northern terminus located just north of Major Mackenzie Drive
1.000 mi = 1.609 km; 1.000 km = 0.621 mi: Incomplete access; Proposed
