= Vinegar Hill, Ontario =

Vinegar Hill
- Unincorporated community
- Interactive map of Vinegar Hill
- Coordinates: 43°52′4″N 79°15′24″W
- Country: Canada
- Province: Ontario
- Regional municipality: York
- City: Markham
- Established: 1805
- Time zone: UTC-5 (EST)
  - Summer (DST): UTC-4 (EDT)
- Area codes: 905 and 289
- NTS Map: 030M14
- GNBC Code: FDAAZ

Vinegar Hill (also Vinegar Hill Dip) is an unincorporated community in Markham, Ontario, Canada bounded by Highway 7 to the north, Highway 407 to the south, and streets just west and east of Main Street South, bordered by the Rouge River. The name of the community is believed to be linked to a cider mill on the east side of the river valley or barrel makers that filled them with vinegar to test their straightness when rolling down Markham Road.

The community is located just south of the historic village of Markham, and has several historic homes reflecting its rich history of being one of the first neighbourhoods settled in Markham. With walking paths along the Rouge River, its abundant wildlife and flora, its proximity to 407, and walking distance to Historic Main Street, this small neighbourhood has many amenities.

The Main Street Markham South Bridge was a small concrete beam girder bridge with 2 lanes of traffic traversed over the Rouge River and connected Vinegar Hill to the Historic Village of Markham (this 1946 bridge replaced three bridges (including one washed out during Hurricane Hazel in 1954) that crossed the Rouge on Princess Street, Mill Street and Markham Road). The bridge was repaired in 1980-1981. In 2014 the old Main Street Markham Bridge was demolished and replaced with a new three lane box girder bridge and will be completed by end of 2015.

== Heritage Properties ==
There are three significant properties north of the bridge:

- 2 Fisher Court - worker's cottage (Georgian c. 1875)
- 53 Main Street Markham South - Markham First Post Office (Georgian c. 1828)
- 29 James Walker Court - Archibald Barker House and Store (former 49 Main St S c. 1851)
  - 33 Rougehaven Way - Crosby-Prentice House c. 1860 for Delos Crosby JP and relocated north as residence was on property needed for Highway 407.

There are two cemeteries on either side of Markham Road:

- At the end of Princess Street is Grace Anglican Cemetery.
- Rouge Street and Schouten Crescent is St. Patrick's Roman Catholic Cemetery.

== South end ==
The south end of community near Highway 407 is now home to a newer residential development. On some of the older streets there has been in-fill building with larger homes being built giving the older streets an eclectic full range.

== Parks and recreation ==
Both Milne Dam Conservation Park and the banks of the Rouge River are part of the Rouge Park system. Rouge Haven Parkette is a small city owned park on the east side of Markham Road.

== Transportation ==
The community is mainly a car oriented area with much of the area within a few minutes reach of Highway 407 as well as Markham Road / Main Street Markham South (formerly Ontario Highway 48 and now Regional Road 68) as the key arterial road.

Public transit is served by Toronto Transit Commission bus route 102D, which is contracted by York Region Transit. There is only one stop at James Scott Road. More transit options are made by walking north to Highway 7 in Markham Village to the north.
