= List of parks in Markham, Ontario =

Parks in the city of Markham, Ontario are maintained by the Parks and Forestry Department under the Community & Fire Services Commission.

== Usage ==
Most of the city parks are free, Milne Dam Conservation Area requires a fee during weekends. Most parks are closed from 12 midnight to 5 a.m. to discourage loitering. Garbage and recycling containers are available at most parks, while portable toilets are found in parks with ball or sports facilities. They are maintained by the city staff, but there is expectations users maybe asked to keep the park clean. Signage in old parks are wood and are being in process of being replaced with newer metal signs.

== History ==
Markham's park system emerged mostly in the latter part of the 20th century (earliest parks emerged during the 1960s and 1970s in Thornhill but Morgan Park in Markham Village evolved from 1924 to 1957) as it emerged into a suburban community. Parks are adding during the development of newer residential areas.

== List of parks ==
Most parks are named for their respective neighbourhoods, while some are named for notable individuals or family names linked to Markham's past.

- Aldergrove Park
- Alfred Patterson Pond
- Alfred Roffey Park
- Amber Glen Park
- Annswell Park
- Appleview Parkette
- Armadale Park
- Armstrong Park
- Arthur Lismer Park
- Ashton Meadows Park
- Austin Drive Park
- Bayview Glen Park
- Bayview Reservoir Park
- Beaupre Park
- Benjamin Thorne Park - mill owner and namesake of Thornhill, Ontario
- Billingsley Woodlot
- Bishop's Cross Park
- Black Walnut Park
- Brando Park
- Bur Oak Park
- Calvert Park
- Cakebread Park
- Carlton Park
- Carolyn Clements Park - named for Carolyn Clements, a resident known for preserving heritage homes
- Castlemore Park
- Cathedral (King David) Park
- Cedar Valley
- Cedar Wood Splash Park
- Centennial Park
- Charlie Clifford Park
- Charing Cross Parkette
- Charity Crescent Park
- Circlewood Park
- Clark Young Woods
- Cobblehill Parkette
- Coledale Park
- Coppard Park
- Cornell Parkette
- Cornell Rouge Woods Park
- Crosby Memorial Park
- Dalton Parkette
- Denison Park
- Don Valley Park
- Elson Park - named for former councillor Miles Elson
- Featherstone Park
- Ferrah Park
- Fieldside Parkette
- Fincham Park
- Forsters Commons
- Franklin Carmichael Park
- Frederick Bagg Park
- German Mills Settlers Park
- Gordon Weeden Park
- Grand Cornell Park
- Grandview Park
- Greensborough Town Centre
- Harvest Gate Park
- Harvest Moon Park
- Harold Humprhreys Park
- Highgate Park
- Hillmount Park
- Honsberger Field (John Honsberger Field) - local area lawyer
- Hughson Park
- Huntington Park
- Leighland Park
- Lloyd Robertson Park - named for Lloyd Robertson, local area resident and former CTV journalist
- James Edward Park
- John Button Waterway - founder of Buttonville, Ontario
- John Daniels Park
- Johnsview Park
- Macrill Crescent Pond
- Maple Valley Park
- Markham Civic Centre
- McCowan Freeman Parkette - local RCAF Pilot WO Alexander McCowan Freeman, died during World War II
- Middlefield Corners
- Milliken Mills Park
- Milne Dam Conservation Park
- Milton Fierheller Park
- Mintleaf Park
- Monarch Park
- Morgan Park - opened as Rose Garden (Test Plot) in 1924 and closed in 1957 for Lions Club Pool
- Morning Dove Square
- Mossy Stone Park
- Mount Joy Park
- Orchard View Park
- Paddock Park
- Paramount Park
- Personna Park
- Pioneer Park
- Pomona Mills Park
- Proctor Park
- Quantztown Park
- Randall Park
- Raybeck Park
- Raymerville Woodlot
- Reesor Park - named for the Reesor family
- Riseborough Park
- Riverwalk Park
- Rough Valley Park
- Roxbury Park
- Roy Rainey Park
- Royal Orchard Park
- Shania Johnston Parkette - local girl who died from cancer
- Sherwood Estates Park
- Simonston Park
- Sir Robert Watson Watt Park
- Springdale Park
- Stalmaster Park
- Stargell Park
- Starhill Parkette
- Summerdale Park
- Swan Lake Park
- Tomlinson Park
- Toogood Park
- Upper Cornell Park
- Valley View Park
- Victoria Square Park
- Village Park
- Wilclay Park
- Willowheights Park
- Wismer Park
- Woodland Park

== Others ==
Rouge Park was a regional park that has sections within Markham managed by York Region and TRCA from 1995 to 2015. Bob Hunter Memorial Park is located in Markham and is part of the Rouge system. The park along with sections in Toronto, as well as some parts of the Pickering Airport from Transport Canada were transferred to Parks Canada to form the Rouge National Urban Park in 2015.

== Gallery ==
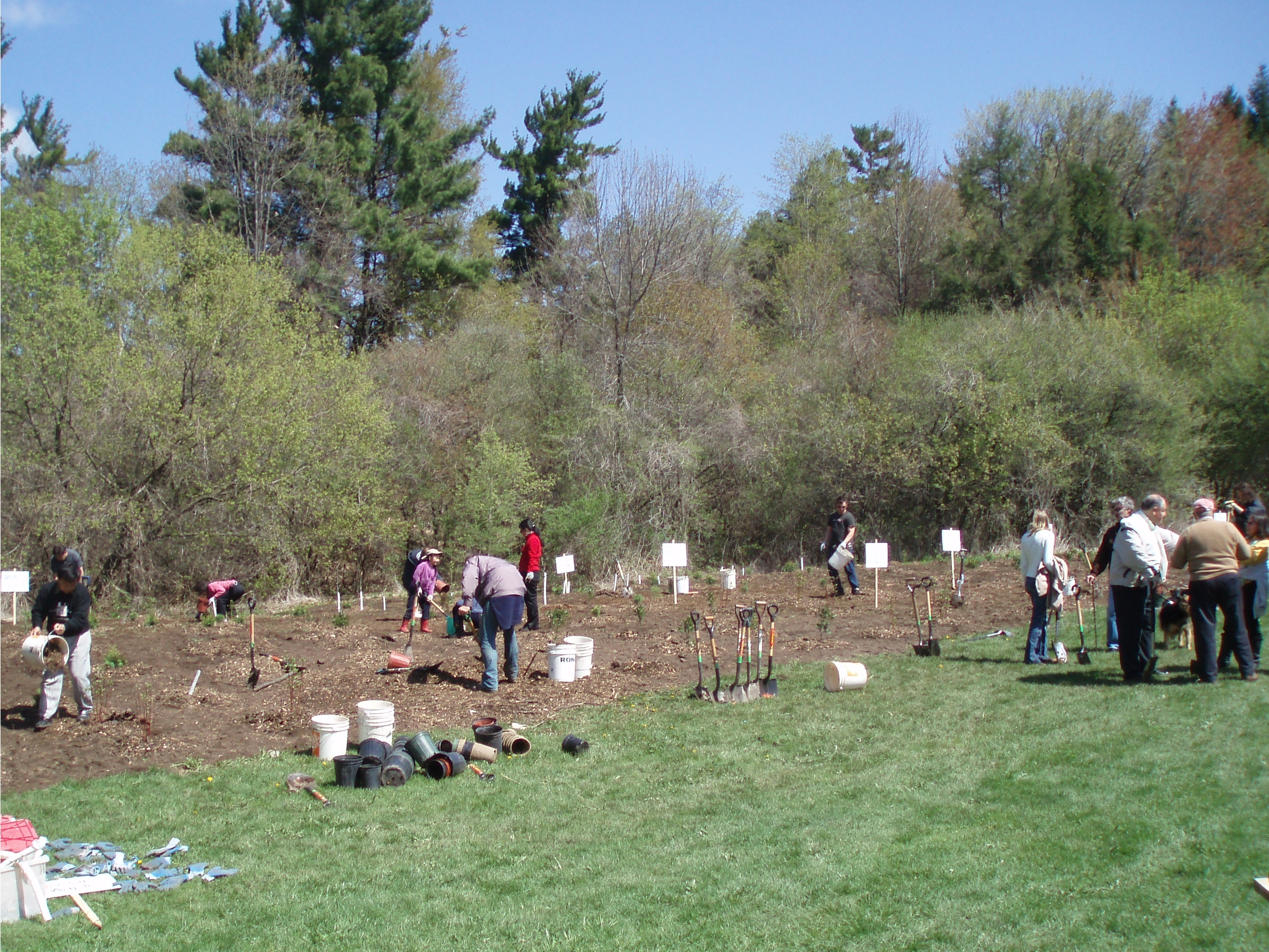
A public treeplanting event in the German Mills Settlers Park

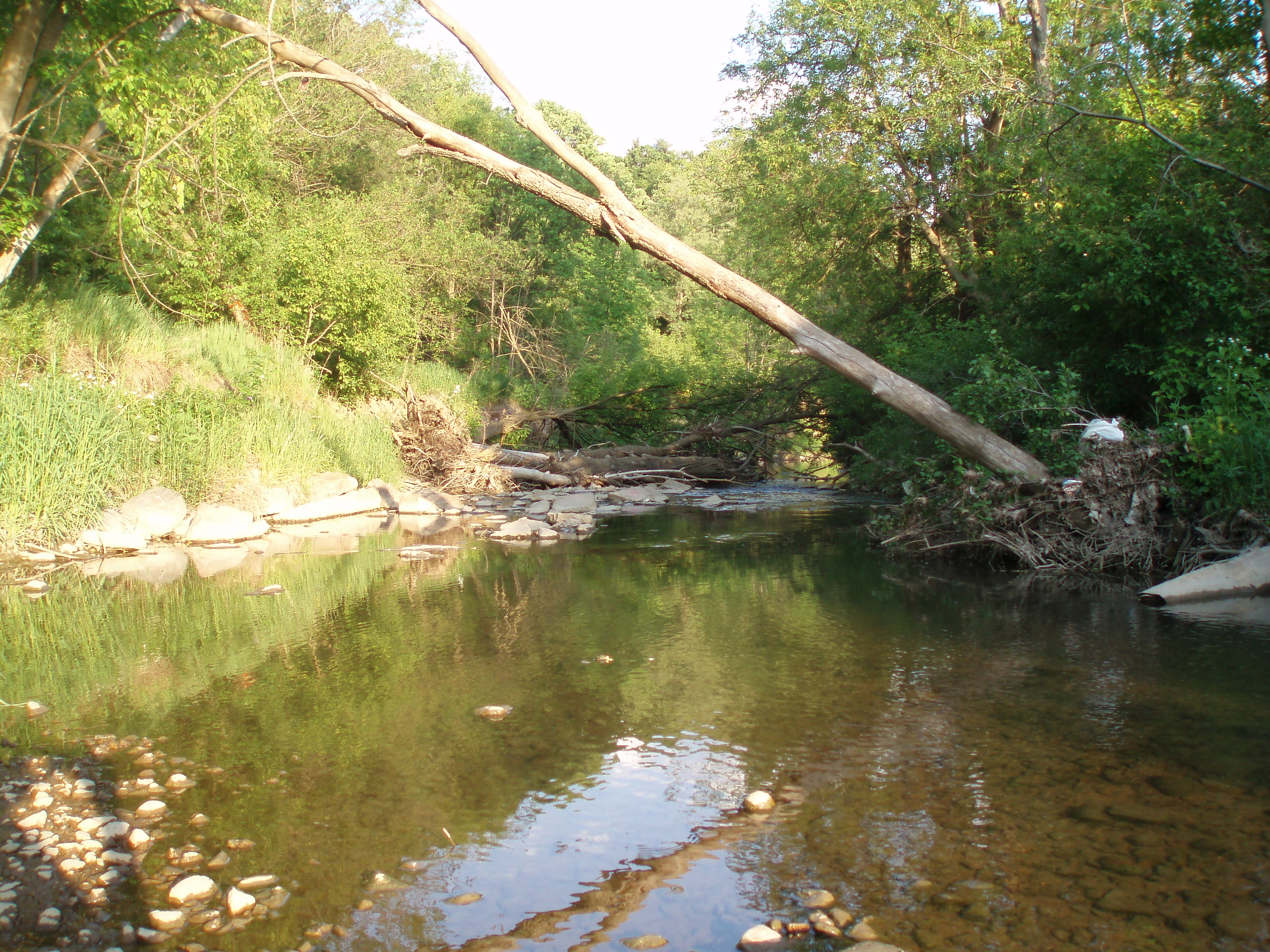
A stream in German Mills Settlers Park

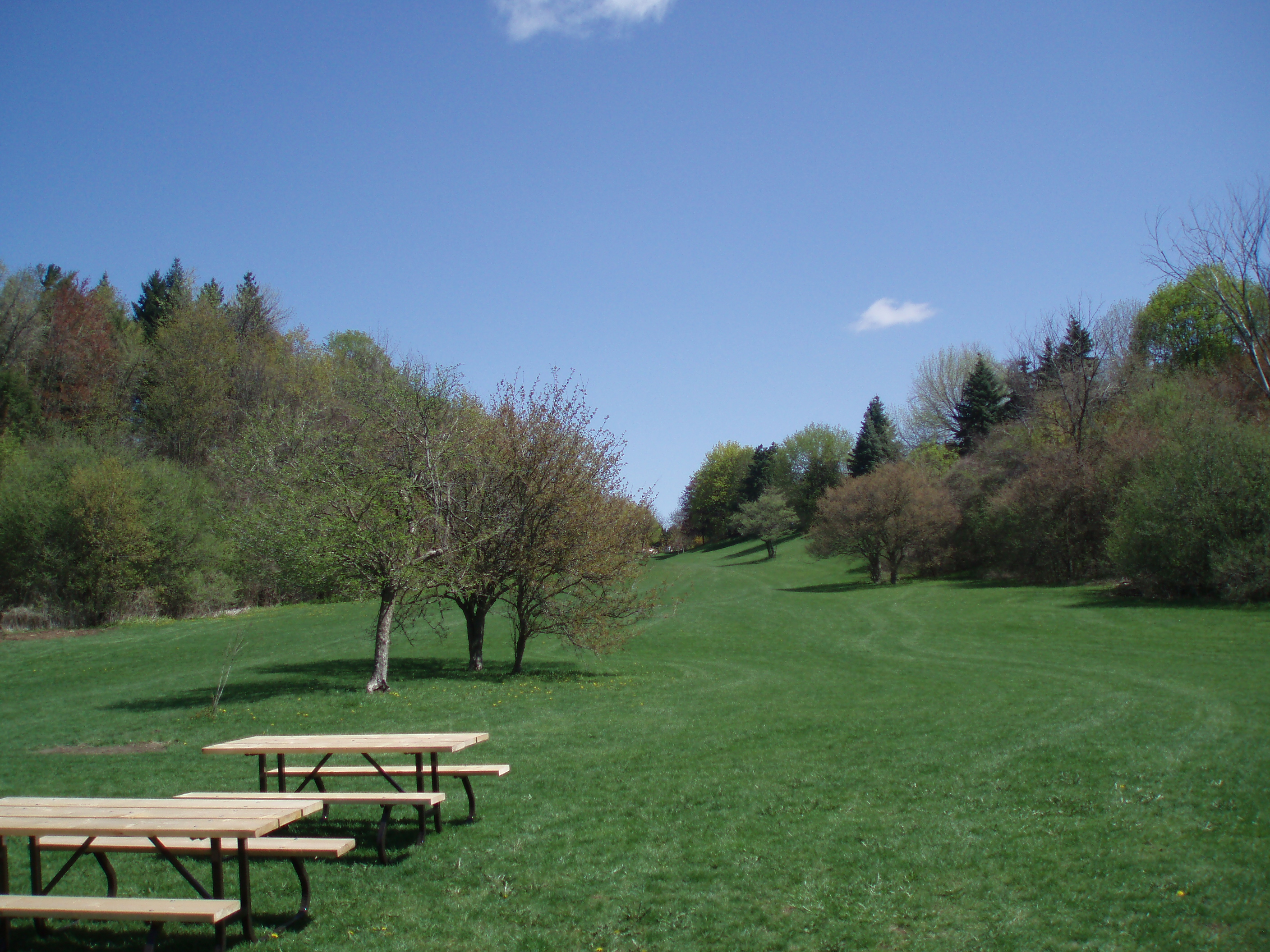
German Mills Settlers Park

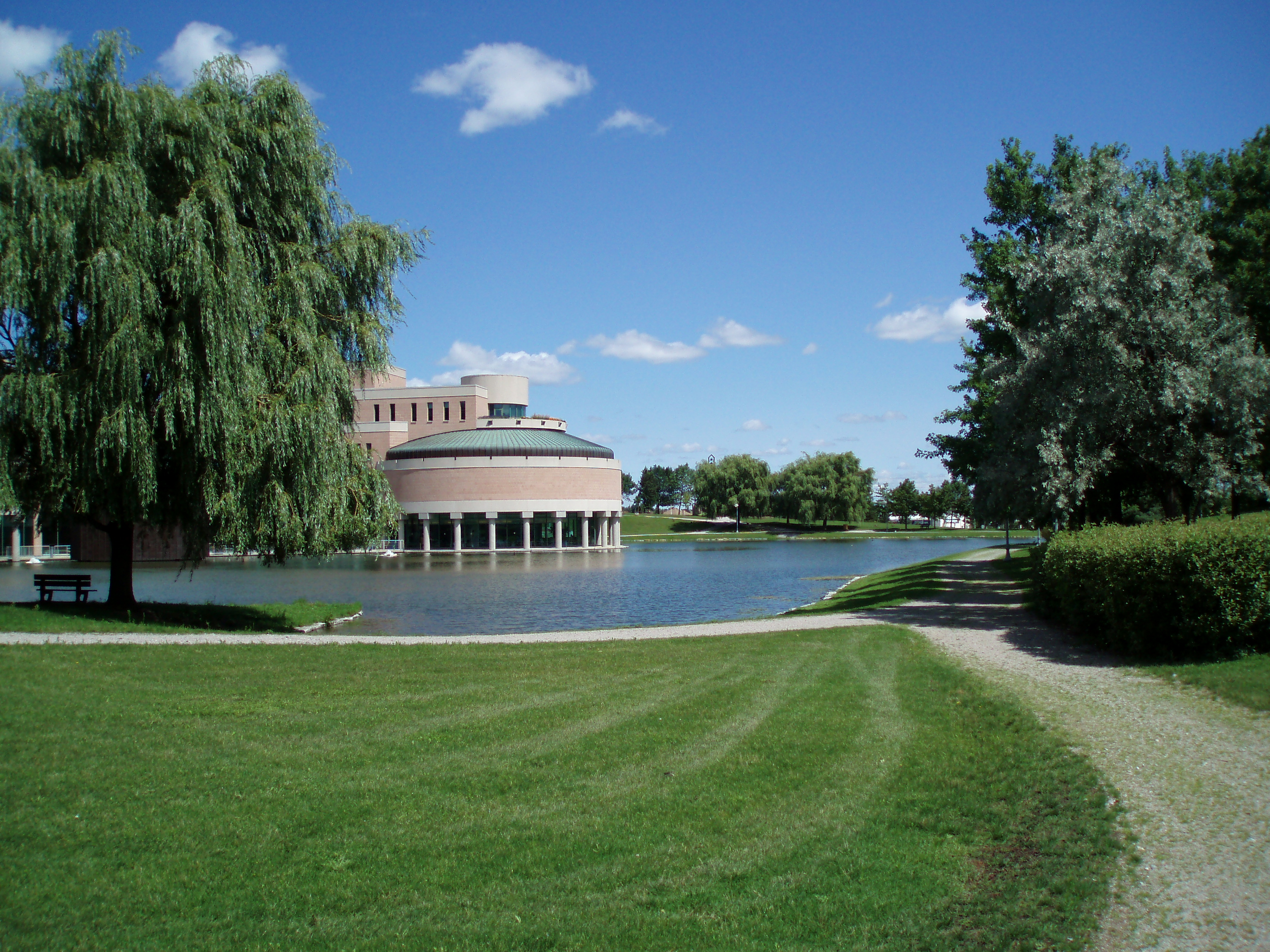
Markham Civic Centre

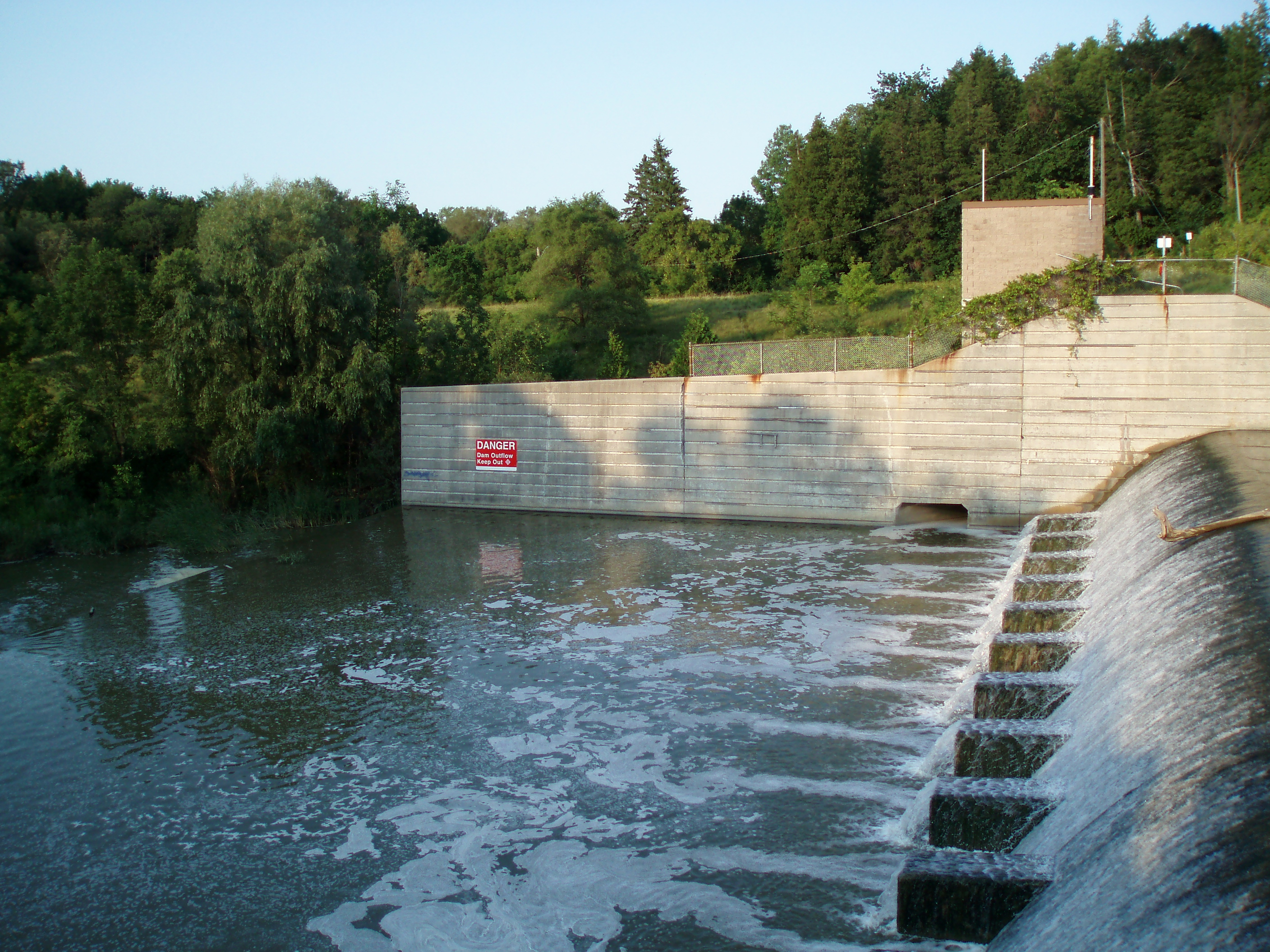
Milne Dam Conservation Park

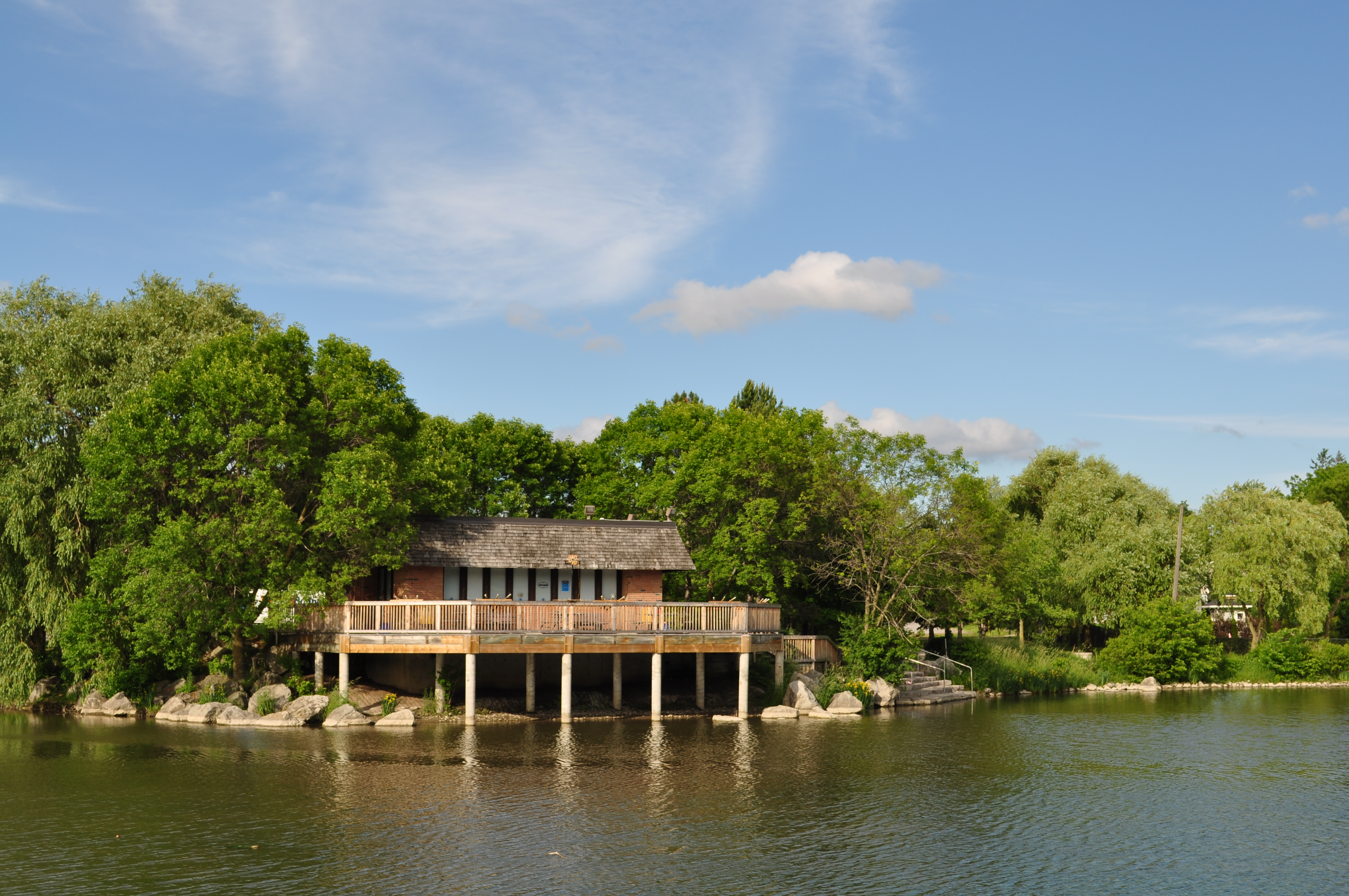
Toogood Pond in Toogood Park

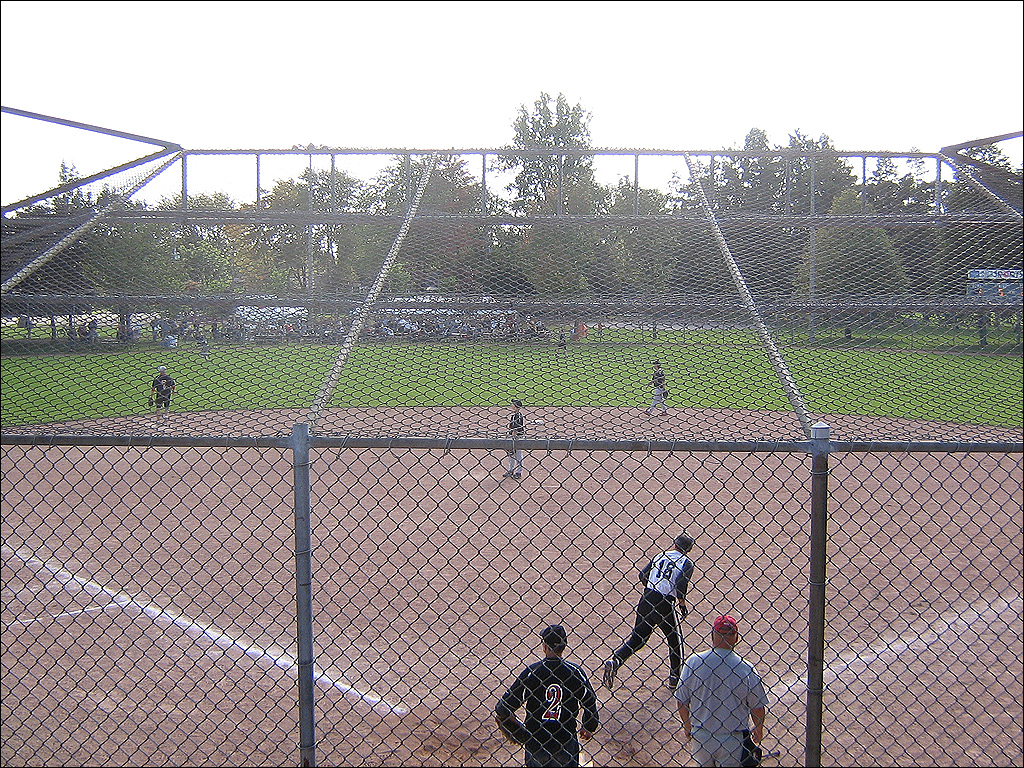
Softball action at Crosby Memorial Park
