= Cornell, Markham =

Cornell
- Neighbourhood
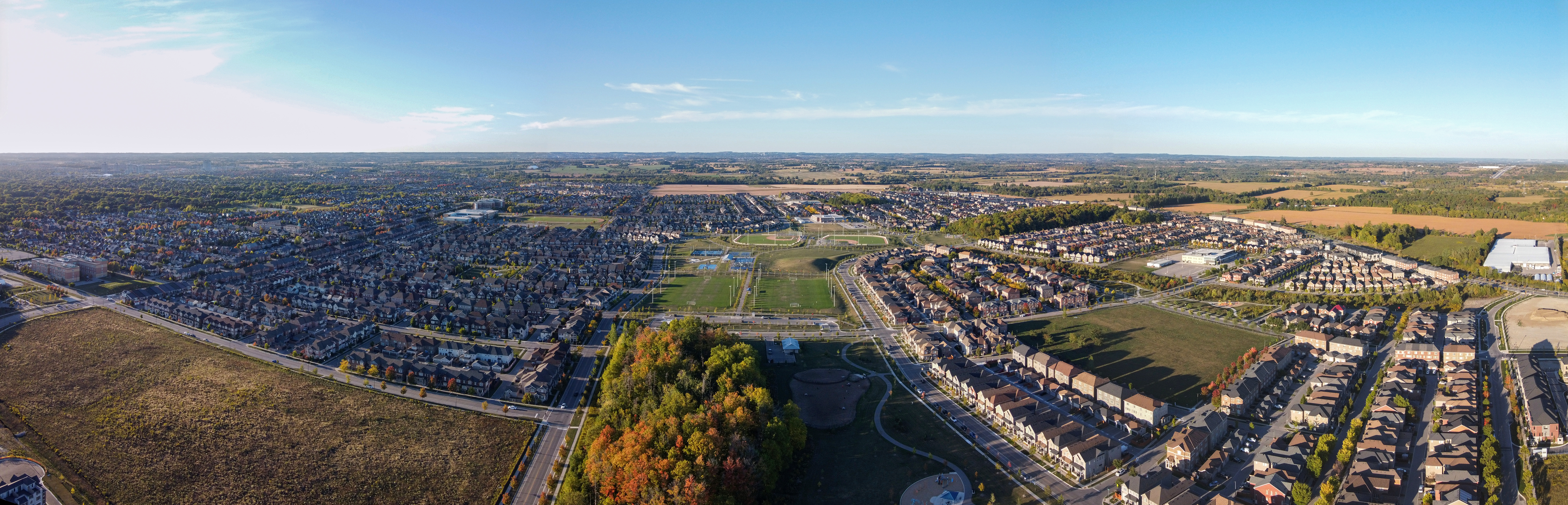
- Aerial view of Cornell

- Cornell within Markham
- Coordinates: 43°53′30″N 79°13′30″W
- Country: Canada
- Province: Ontario
- Regional municipality: York
- City: Markham
- Established: 1997

Government
  - MP: Helena Jaczek Markham—Stouffville)
  - MPP: Paul Calandra (Markham—Stouffville)
  - Councillors: Andrew Keyes (Ward 5)

Population (2011)
  - Total: 9,880

Cornell is a neighbourhood in northeast Markham, Ontario, Canada, bounded by Highway 407, 16th Avenue, Ninth Line, and the Donald Cousens Parkway. The 2011 population of this area was 9,880. Adding Cornell North's 2,178 (from 16th Avenue to Donald Cousens Parkway) it has 12,058 residents.

== History ==
One of the original settlers in the area that is today Cornell was Christian Reesor, who settled there with his family. Their original homestead was on Reesor Road. The name 'Cornell' derives from the maiden name of the wife of Christian Reesor's youngest son, who continued to live at the family homestead.

The area had initially been settled by Peter Reesor, who is credited as the founder of Markham, but many other properties would be owned by Reesors' as well into the mid to late mid 19th century. Cornell's name was selected in 1999, and is named for the Cornell family, headed by William C. Cornell (1766-1860), which came to Canada from Rhode Island in 1799, and eventually settled in Markham.

Cornell was conceived in the early 1990s planning process by the town of Markham. Unlike other Markham neighbourhoods, Cornell is a specially designed planned community. US firm Duany Plater-Zyberk and Associates worked on designing Cornell as a new urbanist community in 1994, as a departure from conventional subdivision design; with a grid street pattern with an on-street retail corridor. Development began in 1997.

== Geography ==
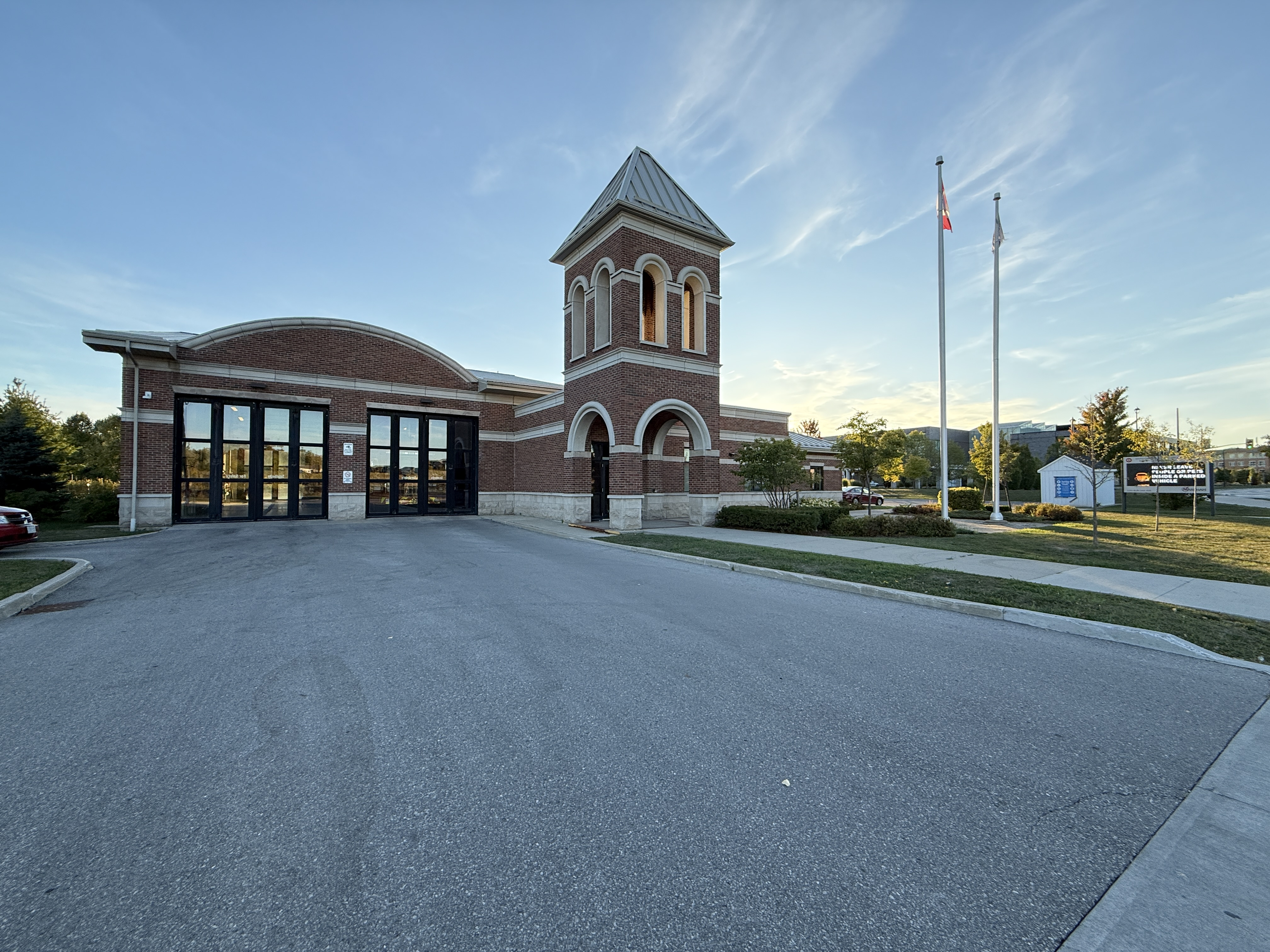
Markham Fire Station 99

Most of the houses are townhomes, semi-detached, or detached houses with garages at the rear. The communities are built with central amenities in order to contain suburban sprawl. Cornell was seen by then-Markham Town Council as a way to deter the ongoing sprawl by encouraging residential density. The community, particularly Cornell Village, is designed as a walkable neighbourhood with a variety of housing types and retail. Cornell Village, between Highway 7 and 16th Avenue, is fully populated with medium density residential. The southern section of Cornell (south of Highway 7) is not fully populated, and remained as a wild field and a farm east of Bur Oak. Redeveloped as South Cornell in 2022. In 2012, the City of Markham completed Fire Station 99 to serve the area.

== Attractions ==
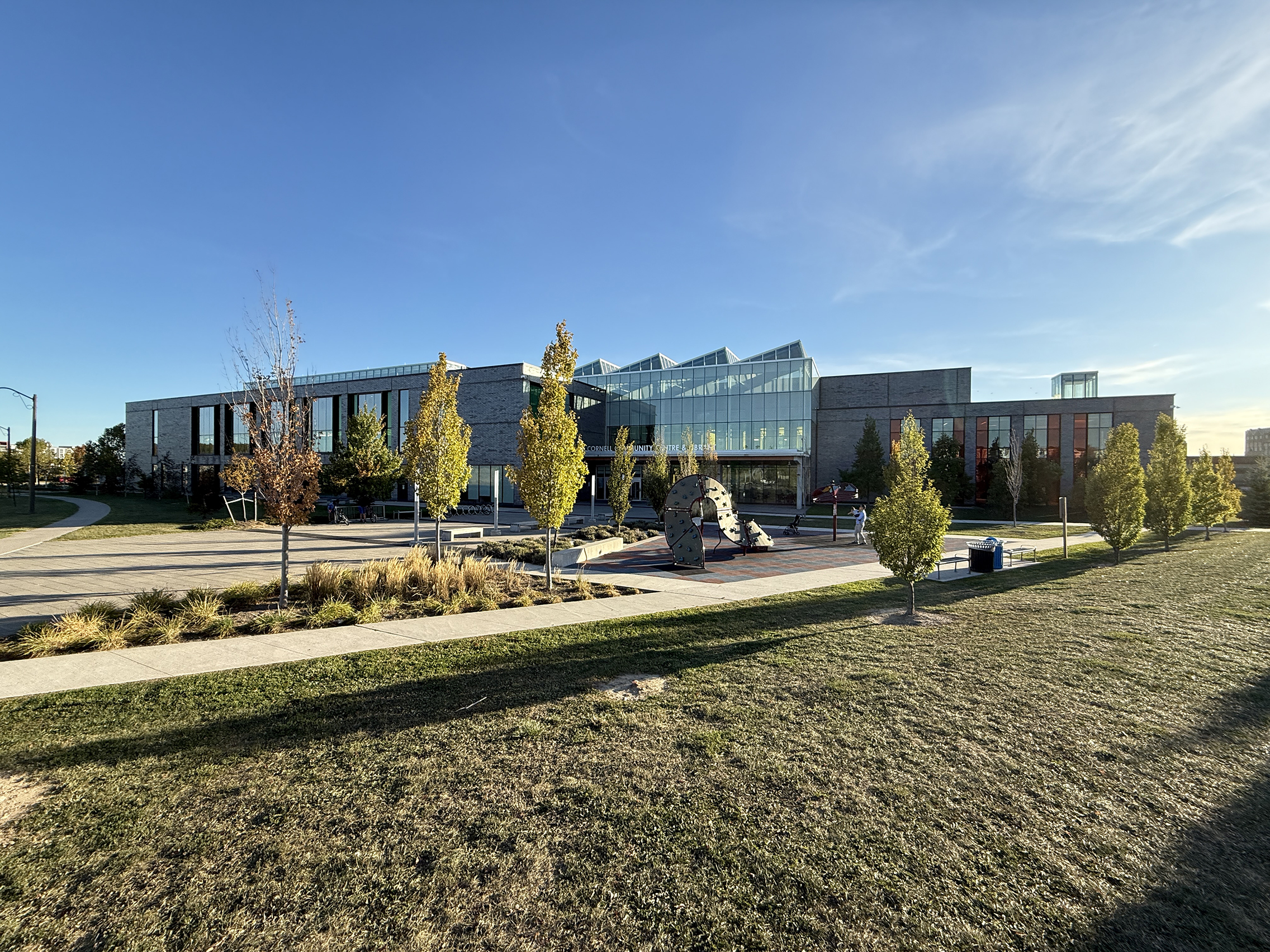
Cornell Community Centre and Library

Cornell Community Centre features a library, community rooms and an indoor swimming pool

There are a number of city-owned parks.

== Infrastructure ==
=== Public transit ===
Cornell Terminal serves Cornell with several York Region Transit, VIVA, and GO Transit routes.

=== Roads ===
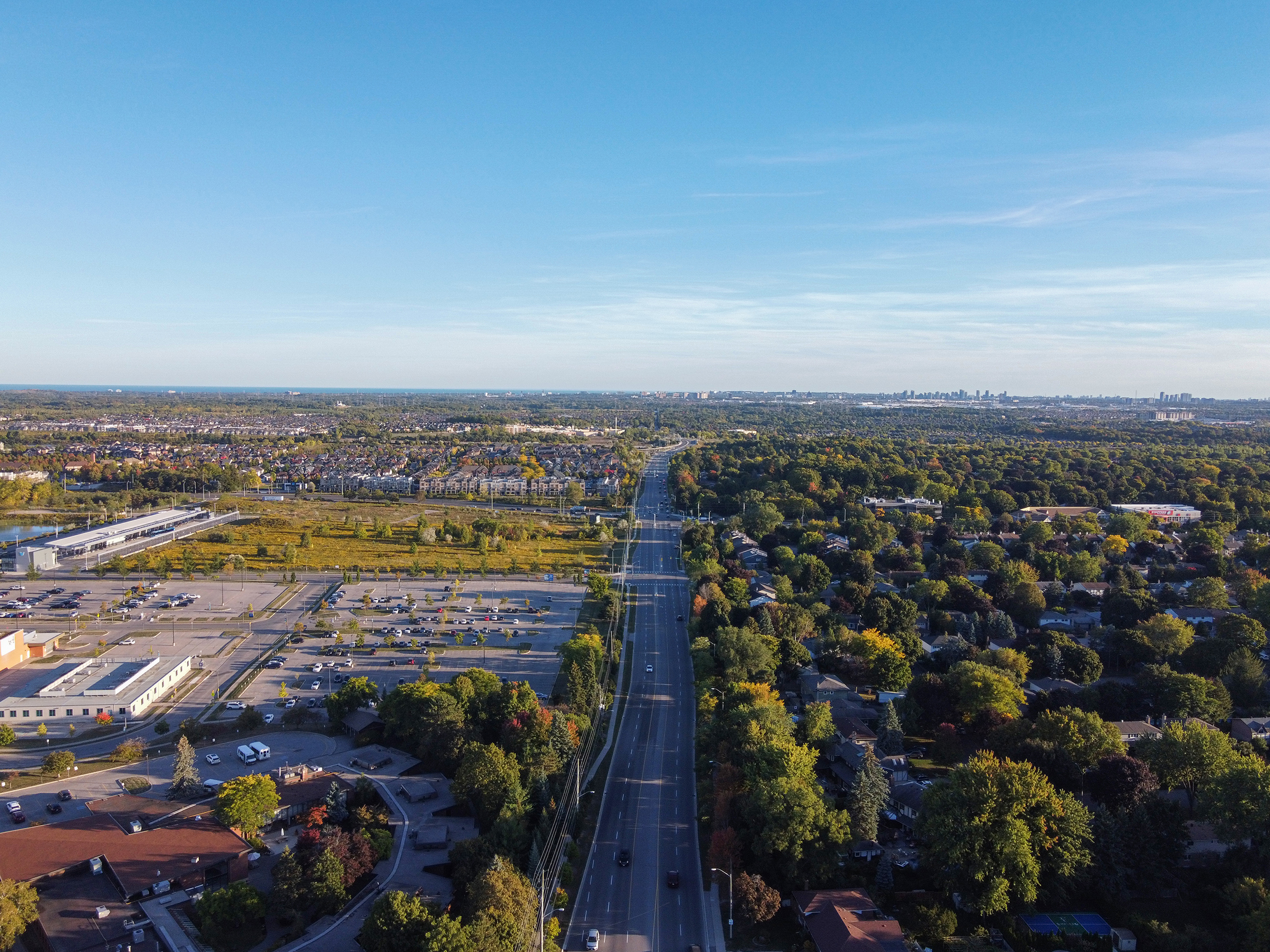
Ninth Line in Cornell

- York Regional Road 7
- Highway 407
- 16th Avenue
- Ninth Line
- Donald Cousens Parkway

== Education ==
Public education is administered by the York Region District School Board. Schools include:

- Black Walnut P.S.
- Cornell Village P.S.
- Little Rouge P.S.
- Rouge Park P.S.
- Bill Hogarth Secondary School

York Catholic District School Board schools include St. Joseph C.E.S.
