= Aaniin Community Centre and Library =

Aaniin Community Centre
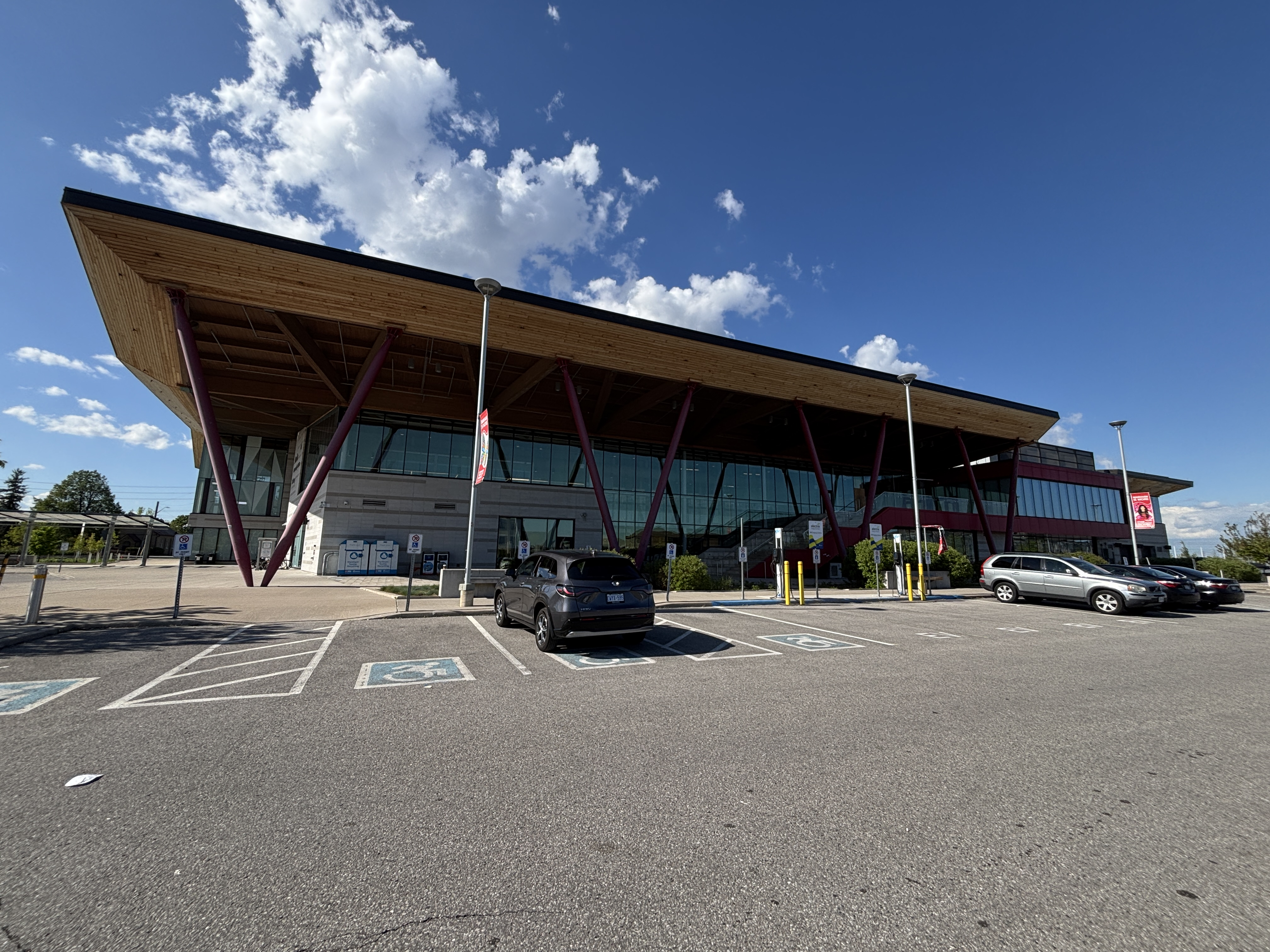

General information
- Status: Completed 2017
- Location: 5665 14th Ave, Markham, ON
- Coordinates: 43.85203°N 79.26611°W
- Cost: $52 million
- Client: City of Markham

Technical details
- Floor area: 122, 000 sq ft

Design and construction
- Architect: Phil Fenech + Duff Balmer
- Architecture firm: Perkins + Will
- Services engineer: Smith + Andersen Group

Website
- https://www.markham.ca/wps/portal/home/recreation/community-fitness-centres/aaniin-cc-library/aaniin-community-centre-library

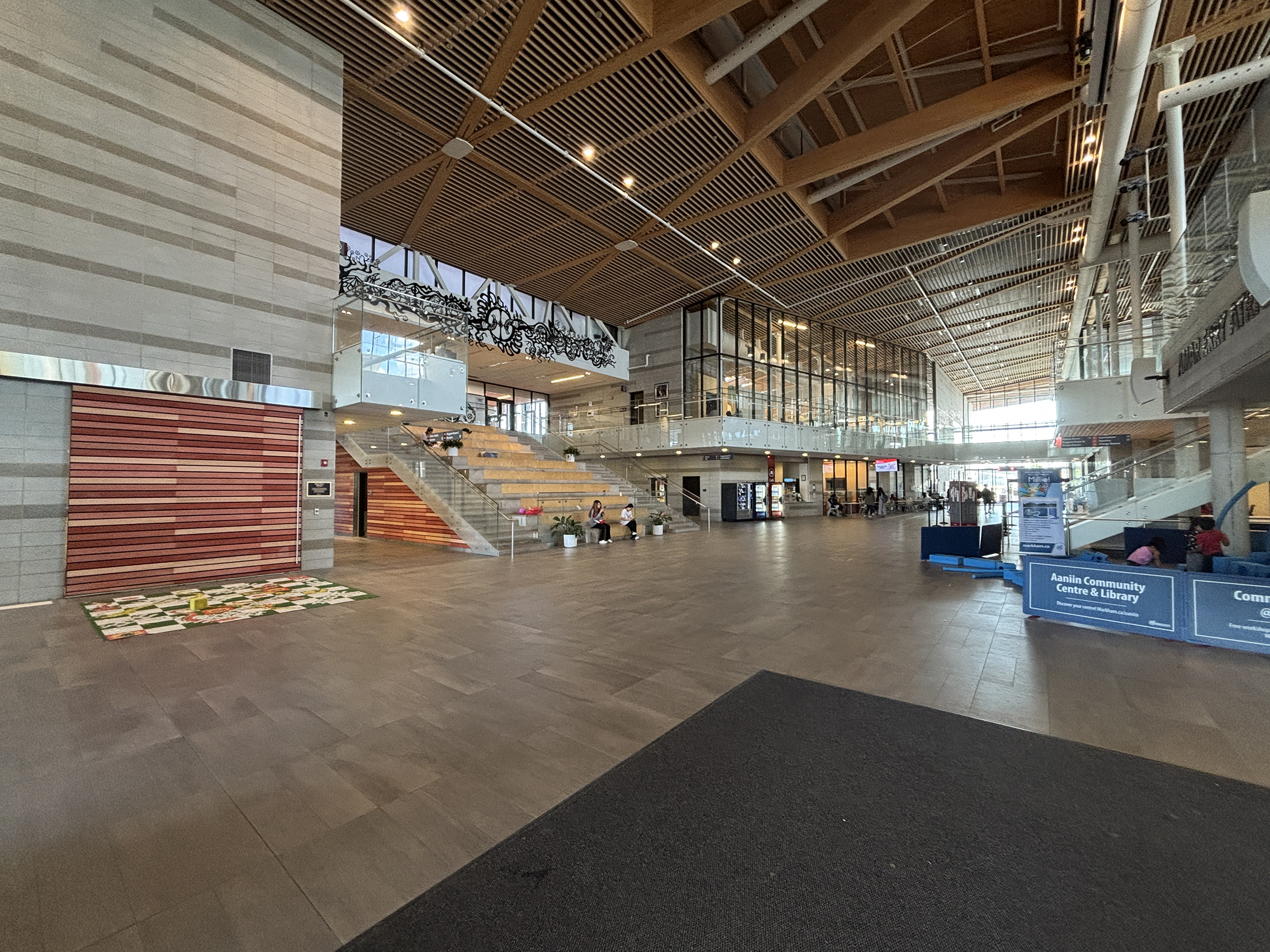
Lobby

The Aaniin Community Centre is a public service building in Markham, Ontario, Canada. The 3 story centre totals around 122,000 sq.ft. and sits on about 13 acres of land. It contains a double gym, teaching kitchen, library, aquatics center, performance space, food concessions and support spaces. On the property there are 3 large parking lots as well as basketball courts and seating spaces.

The Aaniin Community Centre was design by Perkins + Will in collaboration with Fleisher Ridout Partnership. The name of the community centre was in response to Canadas 150th anniversary to honor the indigenous peoples whose land the center uses (Aaniin means a greeting in Ojibway). The identity of the structure is a representation of the ideals of the calls to action stated in the Truth and Reconciliation papers.

The open concept layout and immense pine and spruce roof represent the centre's purpose of inclusion and community. The suburban life of the heterogenous population is represented by the pathways and dynamic public realm that the centre creates. Its materiality acts as a direct reflection of the people that live in the area. Red hues are a prominent factor, chosen as a colour significant to a lot of Asian cultures.

== Design Process ==
The design process for the centre took well over a year as the firm carried out extensive research interviewing city council members as well as community leaders in the area. The feedback they received assisted in shaping the buildings diverse programming. Many households in Markham host multiple generations with grandparents, parents, and the children all living under the same roof. In response, the design team took it upon themselves to create programming for every aspect of the family. The process of analyzing the people within the community allowed for an effective design that creates a multigenerational community centre.

== Gallery ==
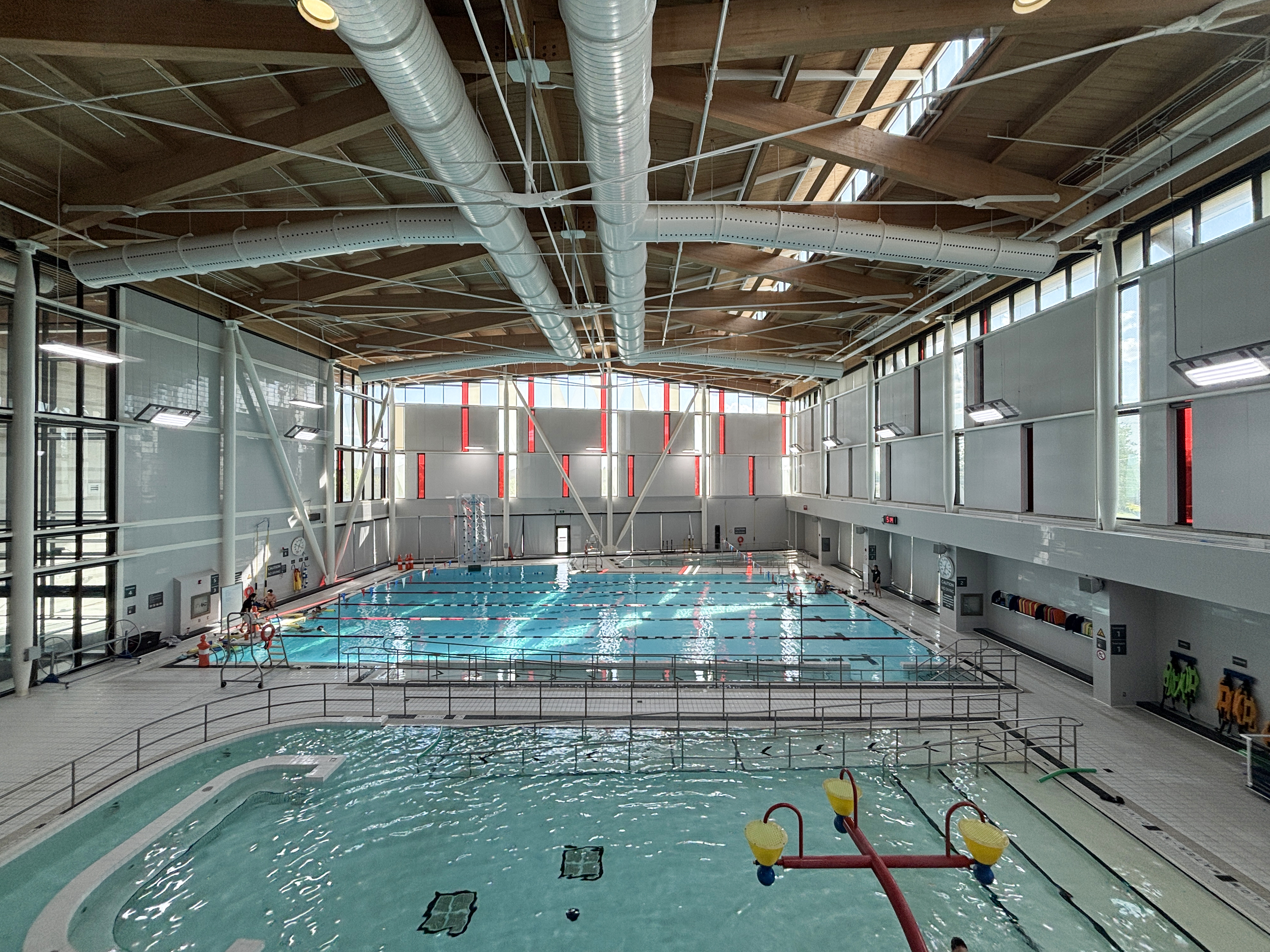
Swimming Pool

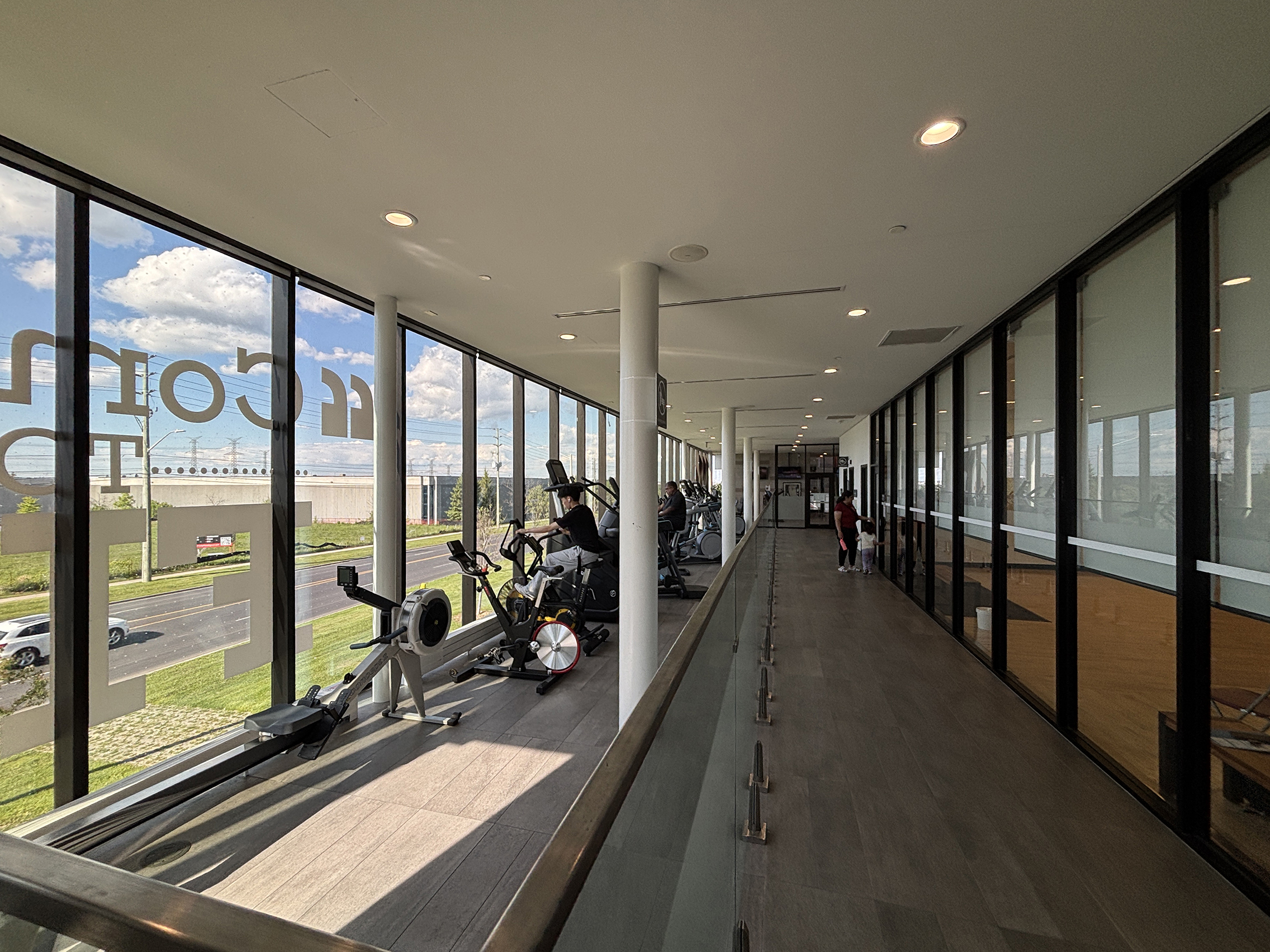
Fitness Room

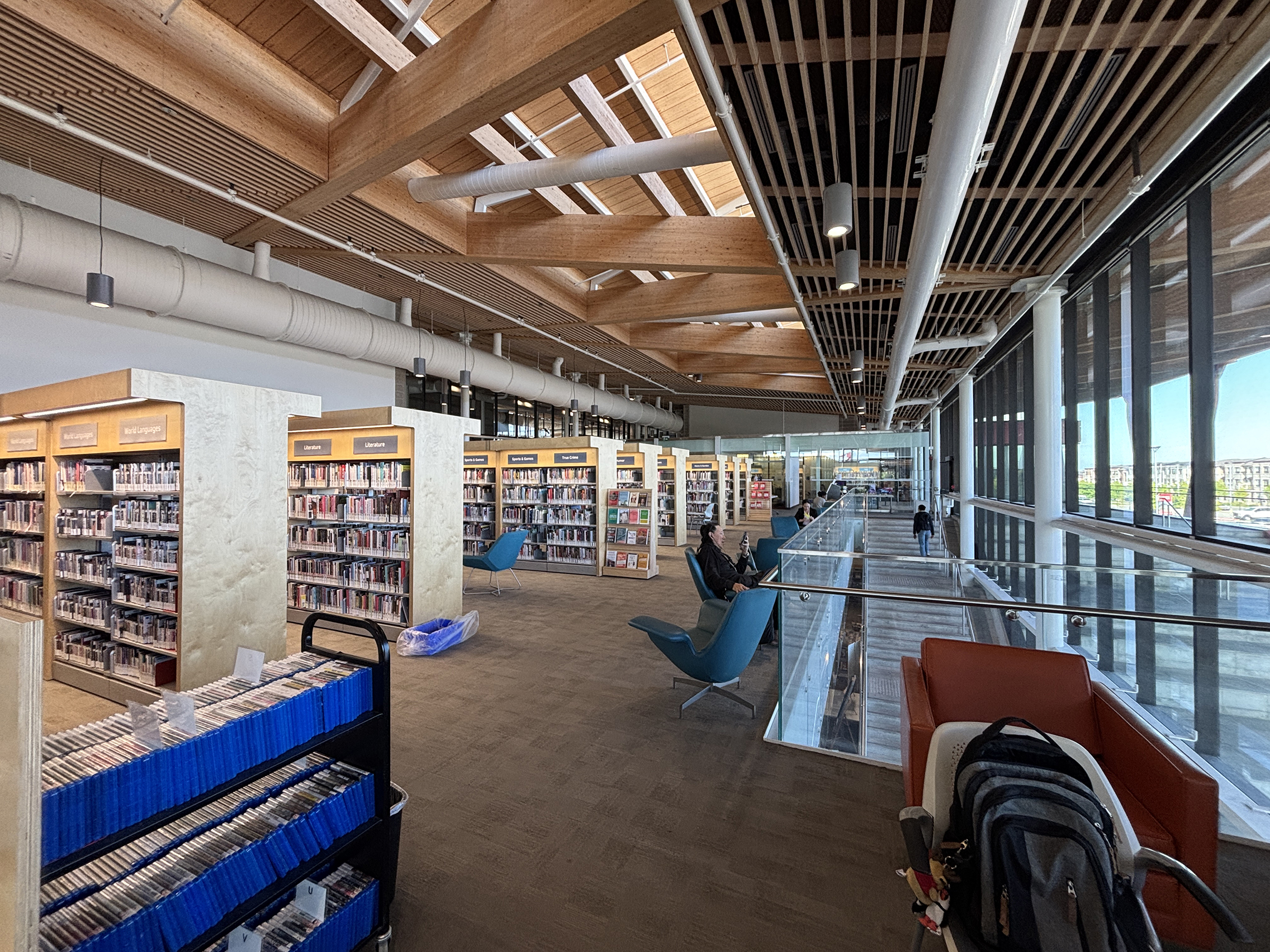
Library

== Annual Events ==
The Aaniin Community Centre is built to host events that give representation to the community. The support spaces inside and outside are available to rent by local organizations of the Markham community. In the spring, a farmers' market is hosted under the centre's outdoor canopy, and the Markham Mayor's Youth Expo is hosted in one of the many support spaces. In the spring the local community gathers for a BBQ with locals bringing various dishes. In the fall another local community event is hosted here, the Diversity Festival. While winter months aren't as active the Accessibility Art show is held inside the facilities.

== Awards ==
- Best of Year Institutional Interior Design Magazine 2018
- Best of Year Institutional Wood Design Award 2019
- Facility of Merit Award Athletic Business 2019
- Interiors Award Civic/Public Contract Magazine 2019
- Markham Urban Design Excellence Award 2021

== See also ==
- Sports in Markham, Ontario
