= Sports in Markham, Ontario =

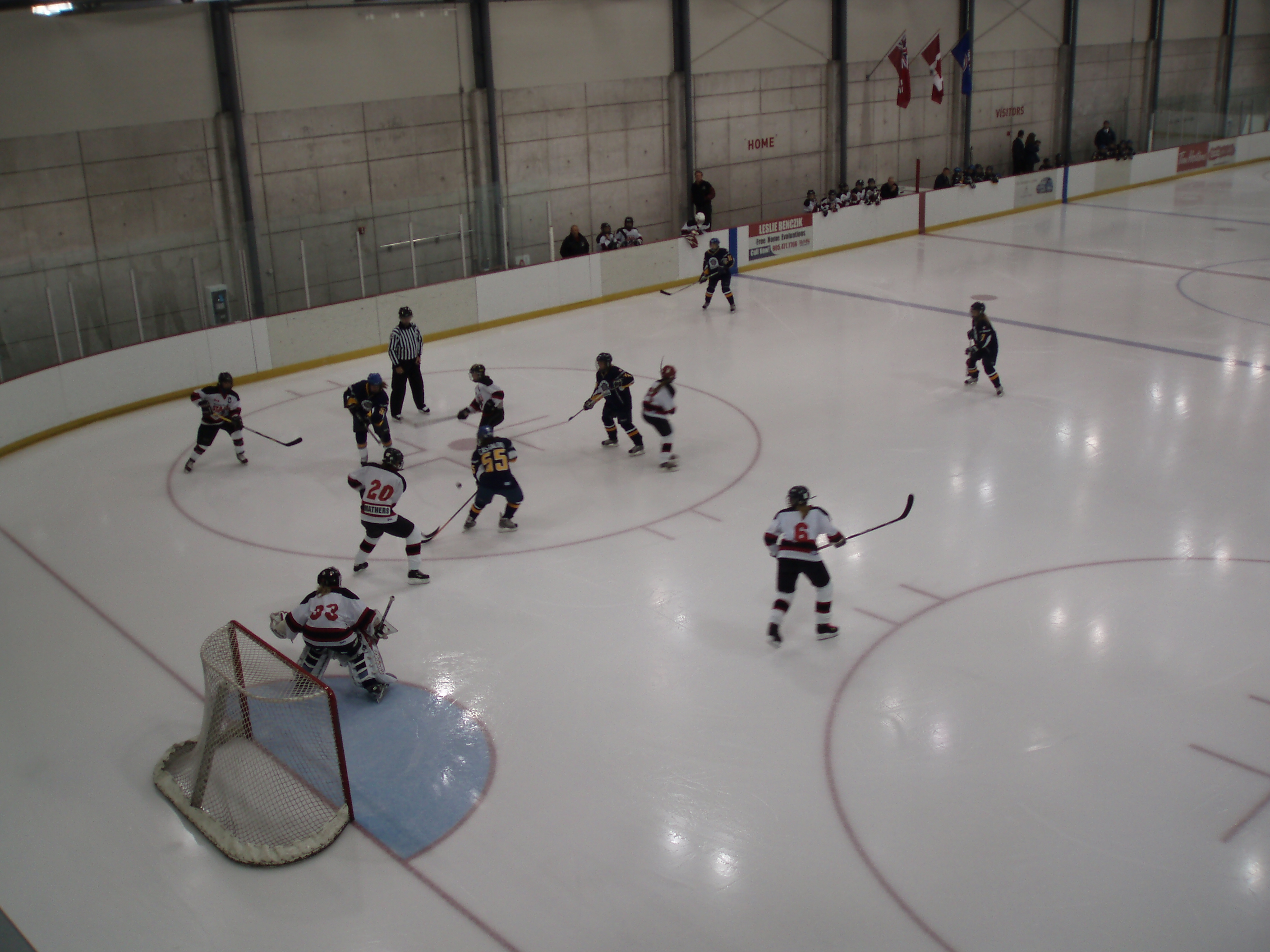
Ice Hockey game at Angus Glen Community Centre.

Most sports in Markham, Ontario are amateur or recreational:

Teams

- Markham Bears Ringette - Provincial & Regional Ringette teams
- Markham Junior Hockey Club
- Markham Mariners - Markham District Rep. Baseball
- Markham Raiders - Markham Minor Football Association
- Markham Stouffville Stars - Girls Hockey Association (L.L.F.H.L.)
- Markham Mariners - Markham Men's Baseball
- Markham Thunder - Markham Minor Lacrosse
- Markham Thunder - Canadian Women's Hockey League
- Markham Ironheads-Ontario Junior B Lacrosse Team
- Markham Waxers - Ontario Provincial Junior A Hockey League (folded 2012)
- Markham Royals - Ontario Provincial Junior A Hockey League
- MUMBA - Markham-Unionville Minor Basketball Association Rep. Program
- Markham Majors - Markham Men's Fastball
- Markham Islanders- Markham Minor Hockey (G.T.H.L. "AA" and "A")
- Markham Majors- Markham Minor Hockey (G.T.H.L. "AAA")
- Markham Irish Canadian Rugby Club - Rugby Ontario Club for competitive youth and adult teams
- Toronto Canada Moose, Based out of the community of Thornhill (Markham/Vaughan) - Greater Metro Junior 'A' Hockey League
- Unionville Spartans - Unionville Minor Softball Association Select Program
- Unionville Jets - Unionville Minor Hockey Association Select Program (Association folded in 2020)
- York Region Raiders- Ontario Varsity Football League

Leagues

- FCCM Basketball Division
- Markham District Baseball Association
- Markham Men's Recreational Hockey
- Markham Regional Ringette Association (MRRA)
- Markham Women's Ringette Association
- Markham Men's Slo-Pitch League
- Markham Woman's Slo-Pitch League
- Markham Unionville Minor Basketball Association (MUMBA)
- Unionville Minor Hockey Association
- Unionville Minor Softball Association
- Unionville Men's Slo-Pitch League
- Unionville Mixed Slo-Pitch League
- Unionville Ladies Slo-Pitch Baseball
- Thornhill Community Hockey League (TCHL)
- Thornhill Baseball Club
- Thornhill Slo-Pitch League

Clubs

- Armadale Tennis Club
- Bluewater Basketball Program
- Markham Aquatic Club
- Markham Cricket Club
- Markham Lawn Bowling Club
- Markham Rugby Club
- Markham Lightning Soccer Club
- Markham Tennis Club
- Thornhill Thunder Soccer Club
- Unionville Curling Club
- Unionville Milliken Soccer Club
- Unionville Tennis Club

Due to the large areas of undeveloped land, Markham has several golf facilities:

- Angus Glen Golf Club- opened 1995
- Bayview Country Club (private) 1960
- Cedar Brae Golf & Country Club (private) - opened 1969 just south of Markham in Toronto and relocated in 1954 from original 1922 course in south Scarborough and again in 1962 from land just west of the current course
- Remington Parkview Golf Club 1997 - southern section of the former IBM Golf Course (c. 1950 as Box Grove Golf and IBM 1967)
- Buttonville Fairways
- Cresthaven Golf Club 1964
- Ladies Golf Club of Toronto 1924 - North America’s only women’s golf course and designed by Stanley Thompson
- Markham Golf Dome
- Markham Green Golf Club 1997 - northern section of the former IBM Golf Course (c. 1950 as Box Grove Golf and IBM 1967) with rest developed as residential
- Uplands Golf & Country Club 1922 - reduced size in 1989 due to development
- Upper Unionville Golf Club (renamed in 2018, formerly Mandarin Golf and Country Club (1991-2017) and Windmill Golf Club before 1991
