= Bob Hunter Memorial Park =

- IUCN category II (national park)
- Location within Southern Ontario
- Location: Ontario, Canada
- Nearest city: Markham
- Coordinates: 43°51′15″N 79°12′45″W
- Area: 500 acres (200 ha)
- Established: August 2006
- Owner: Province of Ontario
- Administrator: Regional Municipality of York
- Website: news.ontario.ca/opo/en/2006/08/bob-hunter-memorial-park.html

Bob Hunter Memorial Park is a greenspace preserve in Markham, Ontario, Canada. It is named in honour of Robert Hunter, one of the founders of Greenpeace. The park was officially opened in August 2006 by then Premier of Ontario, Dalton McGuinty.

It consists of 500 acres (200 ha) of provincially owned land on the western edge of the Rouge River valley within Rouge Park, bounded roughly by Ontario Highway 407 to the north, Steeles Avenue East to the south, Little Rouge Creek (Rouge Park) to the east and the Canadian Pacific Railway Havelock subdivision (Kawartha Lakes Railway) line to the west.

The city of Markham has a development plan for the park which includes renaturalizing the agricultural lands with Carolinian forests. In the spring of 2011, 25 hectares (62 acres) of forest were planted, and in the summer of 2011 a project began to create a meadow on land formerly used for agriculture. The park is scheduled to open in 2015 and "…will feature hiking and biking trails, a nature trail, restored wetland and re-planted native woodland".
