= List of bridges in Toronto =

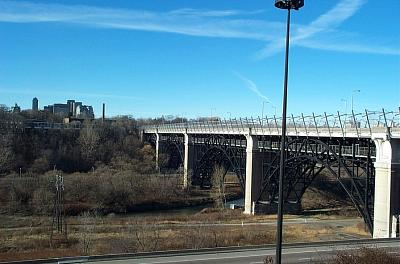
The Prince Edward Viaduct, a popular bridge in Toronto

This is a list of bridges in the city of Toronto, Ontario, Canada.

== Roadway bridges ==
=== Ravine and river bridges ===
List of bridges that cross over the Toronto ravine system and its waterways:

==== Don River ====
Bridges over the Don River ravine, listed from south to north

- Cherry Street lift bridge
- Gardiner Expressway
- pedestrian and bicycle bridge on the Waterfront Trail
- Don Valley Parkway northbound on ramp from Gardiner Expressway
- Don Valley Parkway southbound on ramp to Gardiner Expressway
- CNR Don River Bridge – a five lane railway bridge, part of the Corridor (VIA) c.
- Old Eastern Avenue Bridge

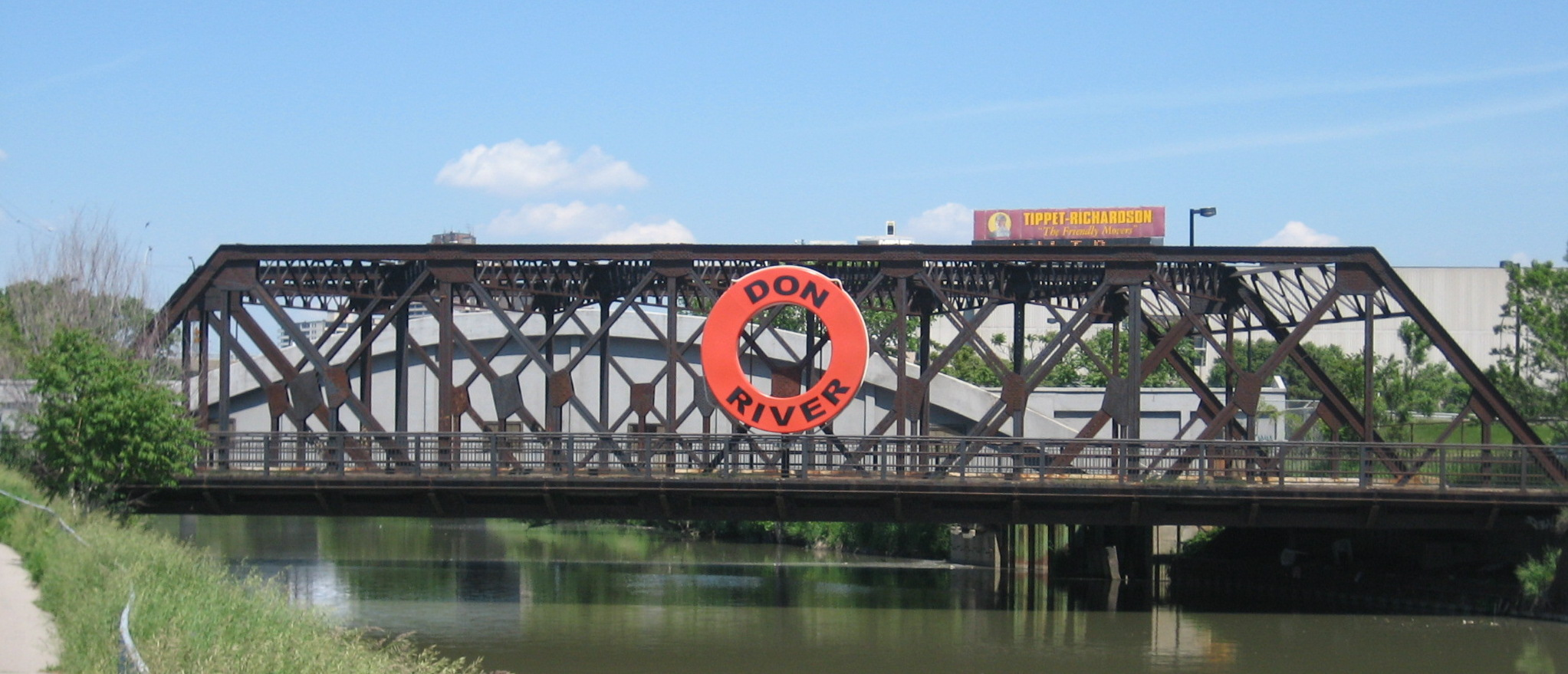
Old Eastern Avenue Bridge

- Don Valley Parkway off ramp to westbound Eastern Avenue
- Queen Street Viaduct
- Dundas Street c. 1911
- Gerrard Street

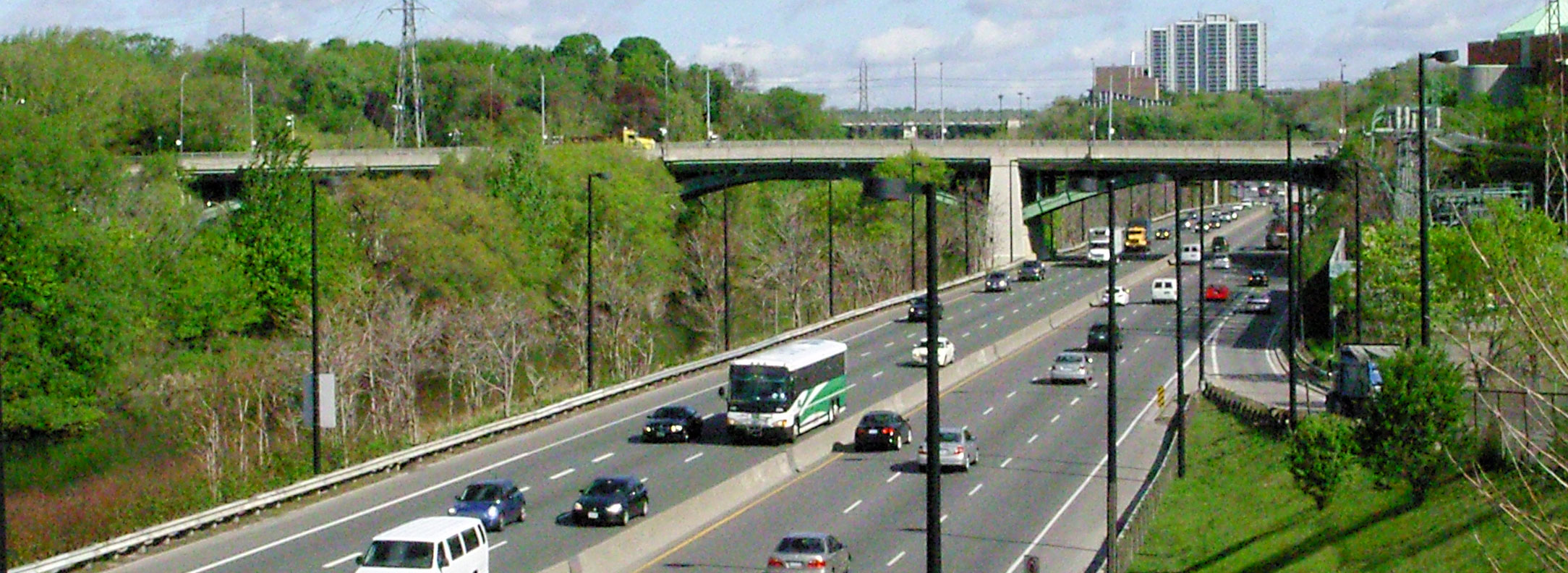
Gerrard Street over DVP

- Plate girder railway bridge
- Prince Edward Viaduct carrying Bloor Street and the Bloor–Danforth line
  - Rosedale Valley Bridge – built 1917 by Dominion Bridge Company and designed by Thomas Taylor
- Bloor Bayview Ramp for Don Valley Parkway access c. 1960
- Half Mile Railway Bridge c. 1928
- Pottery Road pre-1950
- Railway bridge
- Beechwood Drive bridge, part of Don Valley bicycle trail
- Railway Bridge
- Leaside Bridge

==== East Don River ====
- Don Mills Road
- Bridge providing road access to E.T. Seton Park
- Don Valley Parkway
- Railway bridge
- Bridge in Flemingdon Park Golf Club (south)
- Bridge in Flemingdon Park Golf Club (north)
- Eglinton Avenue bridge
- Railway bridge, north–south line – 3 crossings
- Railway bridge, east–west line
- Lawrence Avenue – replaced smaller concrete arch bridge, formerly Bayview Avenue Bridge
- Don Valley Parkway
- Donalda Golf and Country Club – 11 bridges
- York Mills Road bridge
- Don Mills Road bridge
- Duncan Mill Road bridge
- Pedestrian bridge
- Sheppard Avenue & Leslie Street Intersection
- Railway bridge
- Finch Avenue East just west of Leslie Street
- Cummer Avenue bridge
- Steeles Avenue East just west of Bayview Avenue
- Steeles Avenue East just east of Leslie Street

==== Taylor Massey Creek ====
Taylor Massey Creek is a tributary of the East Don River.

- Don Valley Parkway bridge
- O'Connor Drive Woodbine Bridge – c. 1931 large concrete arch bridge
- Dawes Road bridge
- Victoria Park Avenue bridge
- Pharmacy Avenue bridge

==== West Don River ====
- Overlea Boulevard bridge (Charles H. Hiscott Bridge c. 1960)
- Railway bridge
- Eglinton Avenue East bridge
- Bayview Avenue north of Lawrence Avenue East

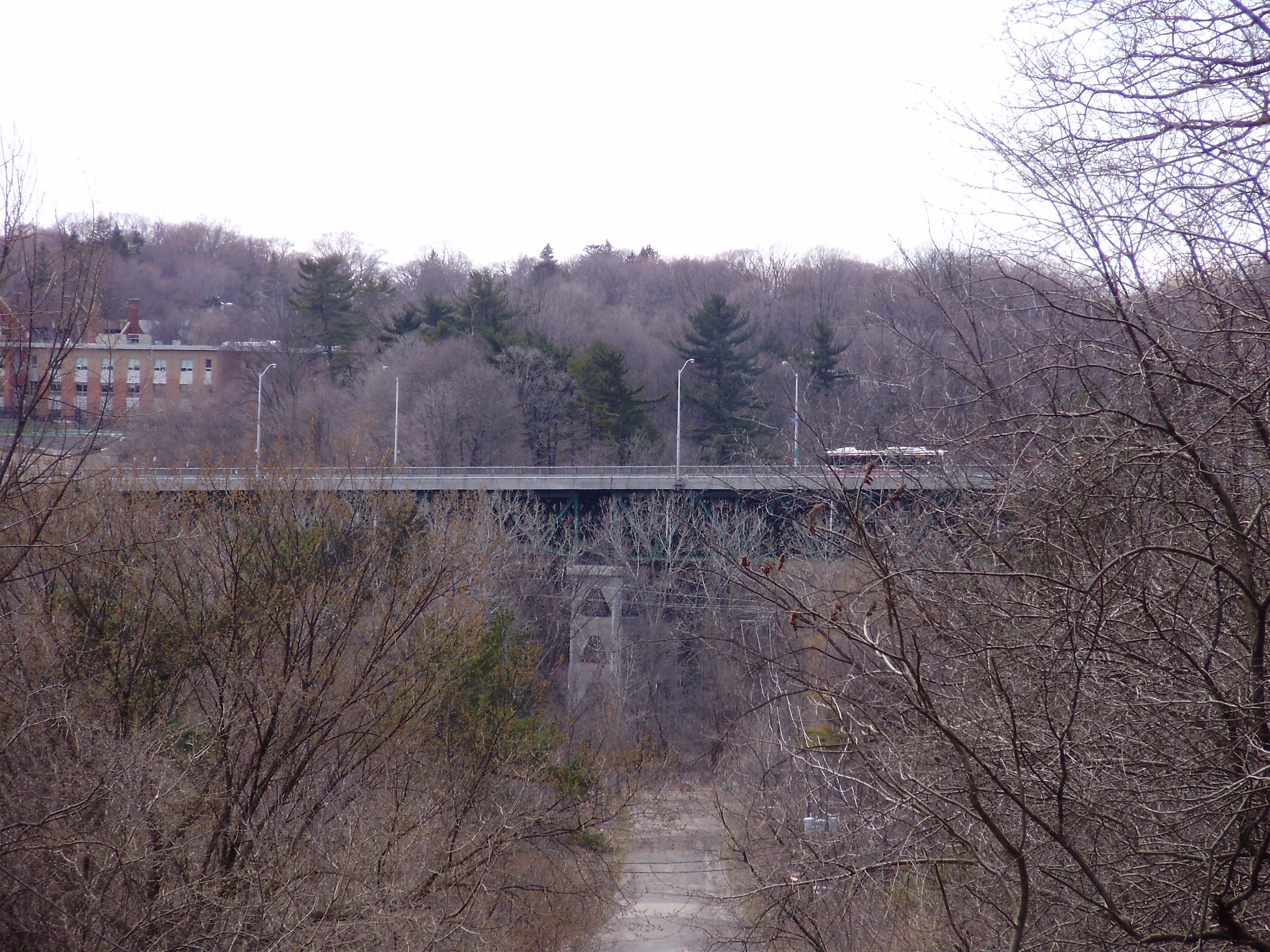
Bayview Avenue over West Don

- Hogg's Hollow Bridge, MacDonald-Cartier Freeway (401)
- Sheppard Avenue Bridge east of Bathurst Street

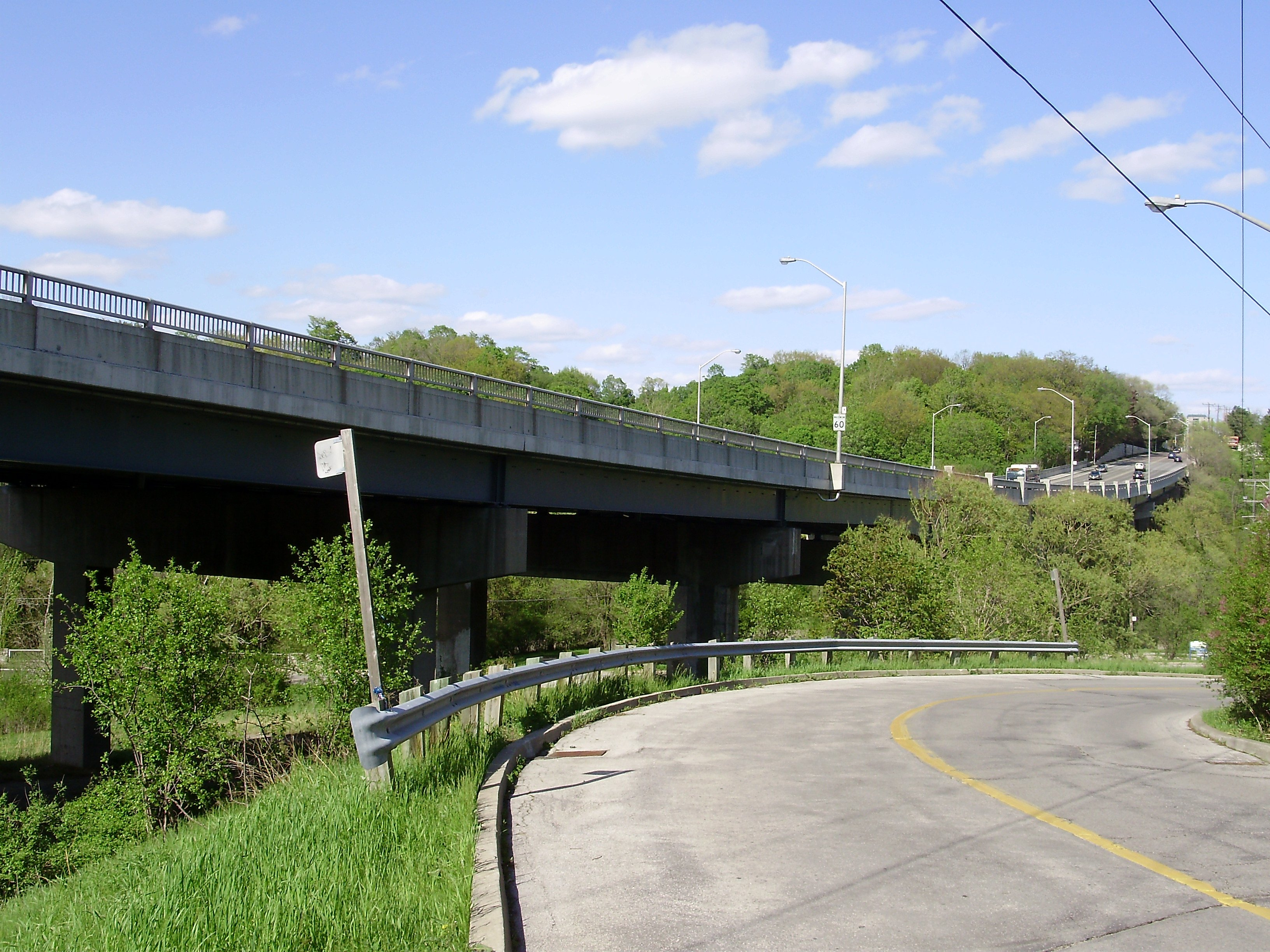
Sheppard Avenue West over West Don near Bathurst Street

==== Humber River ====
- Finch Avenue and Islington Avenue – twin intersecting bridges Humber River
- Rowntree Mill Road Bridge – former road bridge for Rowntree Mill Road Over Humber River, now pedestrian traffic only
- Highway 27
- Martin Grove Road
- Kipling Avenue
- Albion Road – concrete box girder bridge for vehicular traffic c. 1970s to replace the previous bridge that later became a pedestrian crossing
- Musson's or Flindon Road bridge – c. 1910 Warren truss bridge located near the current Albion Road bridge and demolished 1960; it replaced an earlier bridge built in late 1830s to carry the Weston Plank Road.
- The Queensway
- Steeles Avenue West over the Humber River (west of Islington Avenue)
- Scarlett Road
- St Phillip's Road
- Guelph Radial Line Bridge – c. 1917 and bridge removed after 1931; footing reused for current pedestrian bridge
- Lambton/Dundas Street Bridge c. 1929
- Lambton Mills Bridge – c. 1907 and demolished 1955; only abutments remain
- Old Mill Bridge spanning Humber River, connecting Old Mill Rd. and Catherine St. c. 1916
- Bloor Humber Bridge – c. 1924, metal hinged solid ribbed spandrel braced deck arch bridge has been rehabilitated in 1980 and 2010

==== Other ====
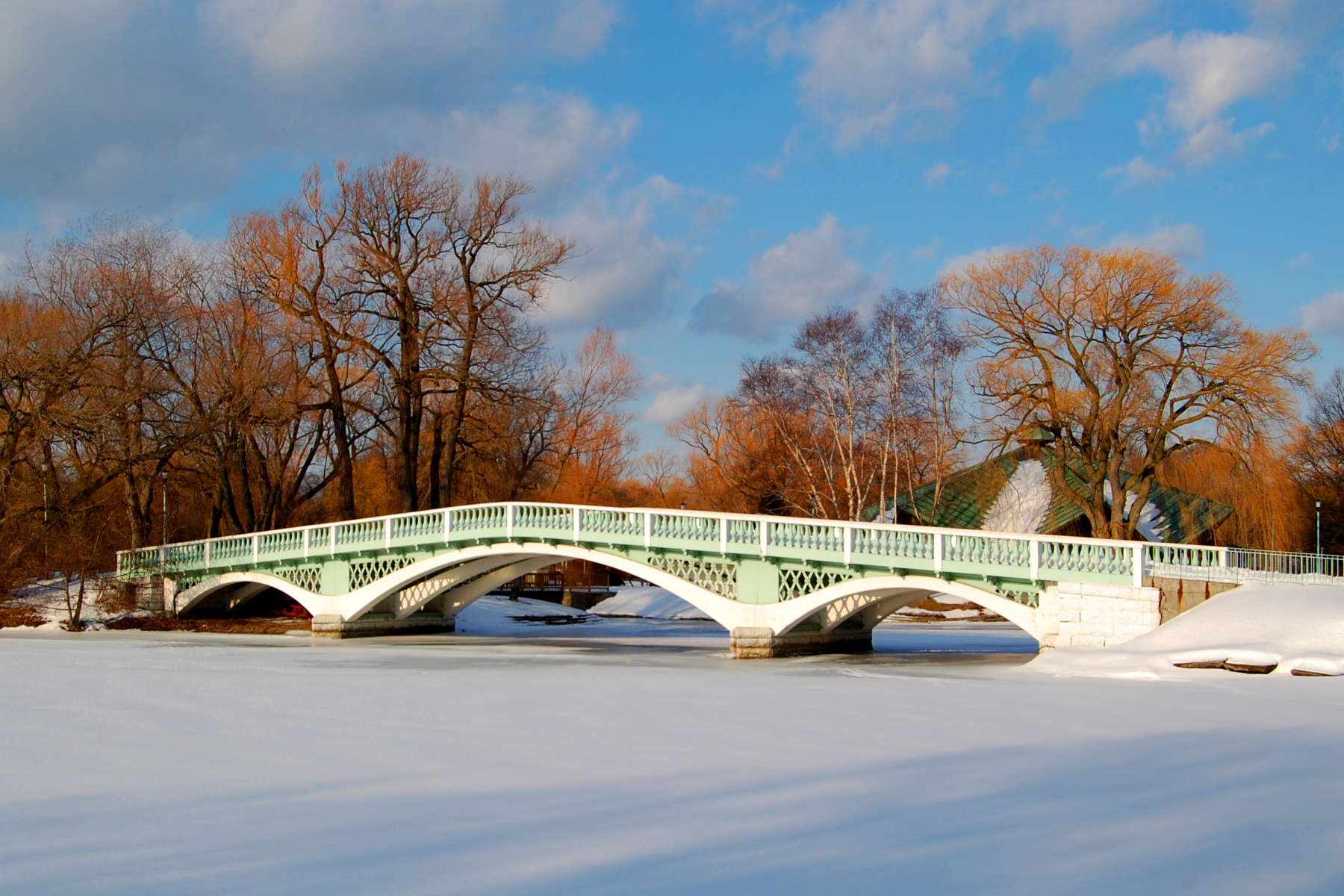
Avenue of the Islands bridge on Toronto Islands

- Avenue of the Islands bridge – on Toronto Islands
- Cherry Street Bridge over the Keating Shipping Channel
- Kingston Road over the Rouge River
- Mount Pleasant Road north of Blythwood Road over Blythwood Ravine Park
- Markham Road between Lawrence Avenue East and Eglinton Avenue East (West Highland Creek, part of the Highland Creek watershed)
- Bathurst Street over Cedarvale Park (Castle Frank Brook)
- Rouge River Bridge carrying Highway 401 over the Rouge River
- Bridge carrying Tywn Rivers Drive over the Rouge River
- Bridge carrying Kirkham Road over the Rouge River – built in 1955, it was closed and now demolished
- Bridges (2) carrying Meadowvale Road over the Rouge River
- Bridge carrying Steeles Avenue over the Rouge River
- Railway bridge and pedestrian bridge over the mouth of the Rouge River
- Sewells Road Suspension Bridge carries single lane of traffic over Rouge River
- Shoreham Drive over Black Creek
- Overpasses on Jane Street over Black Creek – north of Wilson Avenue and south of Highway 401
- Overpass over Black Creek at Humber Boulevard and Weston Road
- Bridge over Black Creek at Alliance Avenue and Hilldale Road
- Bridge over Black Creek on Rockcliffe Boulevard
- Unwin Avenue Bridge – single lane bailey bridge (new replacing original) located in the Portlands area for vehicular traffic over outlet/slip for the former Hearn Generating Station out into Toronto Outer Harbour and now twinned with new bridge for pedestrians and cyclists (replacing small walkway built next to bailey bridge).
- Vale of Avoca Bridge over Yellow Creek, also known as St. Clair Viaduct

=== Other roadway bridges ===
==== Roadway overpasses ====
List of bridges or overpasses over other roadways:

- Avenue Road over Highway 401 (rebuilding 2018–2019)
- Don Mills Road over Highway 401 (refurbished by City of Toronto)
- Lawrence Avenue East over the Don Valley Parkway
- Lawrence Avenue West over Allen Road
- Glencairn Avenue over Allen Road
- Finch Avenue East over the Highway 404
- Sheppard Avenue East over the Highway 404
- Steeles Avenue East over the Highway 404
- Victoria Park Avenue over Highway 401 (rebuilt)
- Wynford Drive over the Don Valley Parkway
- Flemington Road over Allen Road
- Wilson Heights Boulevard over Transit Road
- Mount Pleasant Road over Rosedale Valley Road
- Glen Road over Reservation Park Drive
- Governor's Road over Mud Creek
- Bloor Street East over Rosedale Valley Road
- Queen Street East over Don Valley Parkway
- Gerrard Street East over Don Valley Parkway
- Dundas Street East over Don Valley Parkway
- Dundas Street West over Kipling Avenue
- Bloor Street West over Kipling Avenue
- Bloor Street West over Highway 427
- Dundas Street West over Highway 427
- Burnhamthorpe Road over Highway 427
- Rathburn Road over Highway 427
- Dixon Road over Highway 27
- Highway 401 off ramp over Yonge Street (rebuilt)
- Highway 401 over Bathurst Street south of Wilson Avenue
- Highway 401 over Wilson Avenue east of Bathurst Street
- Albion Road over Weston Road
- Highway 401 over Warden Avenue (rebuilt 2012–2013)
- Highway 401 over Wendell Avenue
- Highway 400 over Wilson Avenue
- Highway 400 over Finch Avenue West
- Highway 401 over Keele Street – (rebuilt 2012–2013)
- Sheppard Avenue West over Ontario Highway 400
- Highway 400 over Steeles Avenue West – c. 1961 with only four lanes of Steeles on the southside with north span crossing a dirt road and roughed in for future widening of Steeles Avenue West.
- Highway 400 over Jane Street
- Dufferin Street bridges over Gardiner Expressway
- Westbound Lake Shore Boulevard West over Gardiner Expressway
- Eastern Avenue west of Don Valley Parkway
- Finch Avenue West over Highway 427
- Morningstar Drive over Highway 427
- Rexdale Boulevard over Highway 427
- Browns Line over Lake Shore Blvd West
- Spanbridge Road over Don Valley Parkway
- St. Dennis Drive over Don Valley Parkway
- Eglinton Avenue over Don Valley Parkway
- Van Horne Avenue over Highway 404
- McNicoll Avenue over Highway 404
- Jameson Avenue bridge over rail corridor north of Gardiner Expressway b. 2004 to replace earlier structure

==== Railway overpasses ====
List of bridges over railway lines (to avoid need for at grade level crossings):

- Highway 27 (Ontario) south of Steeles Avenue West over CN tracks
- Markham Road north of Sheppard Avenue East over CP tracks connecting to CP Agincourt Marshalling Yard
- Eglinton Avenue East between Midland Avenue and Kennedy Road over CN and TTC RT tracks
- Lawrence Avenue East between Midland Avenue and Kennedy Road over CN and TTC RT tracks
- Ellesmere Road between Midland Avenue and Kennedy Road over CN and TTC RT tracks
- Dowling Avenue Bridge carries pedestrians and cyclists over the Metrolinx Lakeshore West Corridor and the Gardiner Expressway.
- Dunn Avenue Bridge carries Dunn Avenue above the Metrolinx Lakeshore West Corridor
- Spadina Avenue over tracks north of Gardiner Expressway – replaced an earlier plate girder bridge that was replaced when the Spadina LRT route was rebuilt in the 1990s. Below are tracks for VIA, GO Transit commuter and Union Pearson Express trains

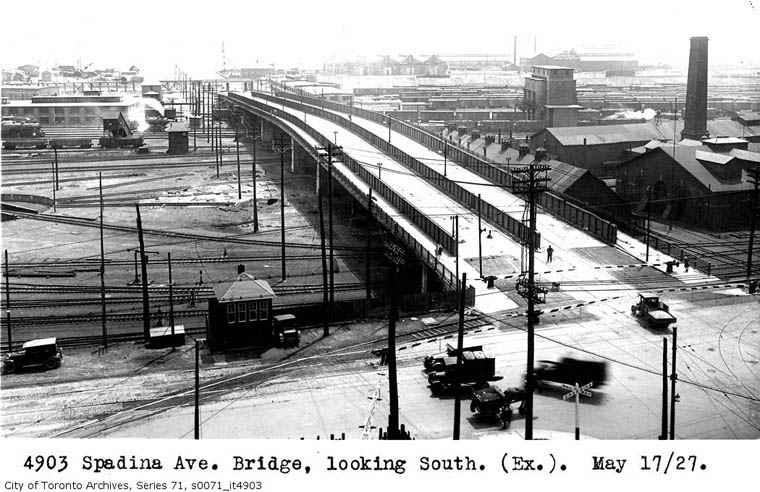
Spadina bridge in 1927

- Dufferin Street Truss Bridge a double span over the Gardiner Expressway (c.1958) and over the rail corridor (steel arch bridge c.1911–12); latter to be demolished for new structure after 2016. Below are tracks for VIA, GO Transit commuter and Union Pearson Express trains
- Yonge Street Railway Overpass near St. Clair Avenue
- Victoria Park Avenue north of Lawrence Avenue East over Canadian Pacific tracks
- Pharmacy Avenue between Lawrence Avenue East and Ellesmere Road over Canadian Pacific tracks
- Birchmount Road just south of 401 CP tracks
- Kingston Road at Guildwood over Tracks

== Pedestrian bridges ==
See also

- Amsterdam Bridge – spans over Simcoe Street Slip from York Quay to Rees Street Slip
- Farr Avenue bridge over Finch Avenue West east of Kipling Avenue (connects broken sections of Farr Avenue)
- Finch Avenue East – Pedestrian Warren truss bridge over Finch Avenue East west of Leslie Street to provide access to GO Old Cummer station
- Flindon Road bridge over Humber – The bridge was formerly the old routing of Albion Road and two earlier bridges and replaced in 1990s when the new Albion overpass was widened
- Chorley Park Bridge – built 1911 for Chorley Park (old Government House) and now path in a city park
- Fort York Pedestrian and Cycle Bridge – Garrison crossing
- Glen Cedar Road Bridge – c. 1989 (restoration by Alan Seymour) is a replica of the 1912 bridge (by C.H. and P.H. Mitchell, Engineers) built by Sir Henry Pellatt to span over Cedarvale Ravine and Belt Line railway and now over Rosedale Valley Road
- Glen Manor Drive Bridge – Warren truss bridge connecting Pine Glen Road and Williamson Road over Glen Stewart Ravine in the Beaches neighbourhood)
- Heath Street East – spans over Mud Creek Ravine (Moore Park) connecting the broken section of Health Street between Brendan Road and Hudson Drive
- Humber Bay Arch Bridge – c.1996 span over the mouth of Humber River flowing out to Lake Ontario and carries pedestrian and bike traffic
- Innes Avenue (over CN railway line to Prescott Ave)
- Lake Shore Boulevard Bailey Bridge – crossing over Lake Shore Boulevard West from Exhibition Place to waterfront
- Ontario Place bridges – two pedestrian bridges crossing over Lake Shore Boulevard West from Exhibition Place
- MacLennan Avenue pedestrian bridge ("The Ramp", over railway tracks and Carstowe Road)
- Tara-Mooregate Pedestrian Bridge – A bridge that connects the Gatineau Hydro Trail, Tara Ave and Moorgate Ave over the GO Train Stouffville tracks and TTC's Scarborough RT Tracks
- Morley Callaghan Footbridge – spans Rosedale Valley Ravine was built in 1992 and restored in 2001 and 2015; major work 2022–2024
- Mimico Creek Bridge (Santiago Calatrava) – similar to the Amsterdam cable footbridge
- Old Finch Avenue Bailey Bridge – crosses over Rouge River
- Pape Avenue – Pedestrian bridge over CN/GO Rail corridor – Pape Avenue north of Gerrard Street East is broken by railway tracks
- Puente de Luz (Bridge of Light) from CityPlace, Toronto over railway below to Front Street West
- Riverdale Park – pedestrian bridge connecting east and west sides of Riverdale Park
- Shoreham Drive – Pedestrian bridge over Shoreham Drive east of Jane Street to access Shoreham Public Sports and Wellness Academy on the south side of Shoreham Drive
- SkyWalk – connecting Union Station to the CN Tower
- Steeles Pedestrian Overpasses – two spans sandwiches rail overpass carrying GO Transit Stouffville line over Steeles Avenue East just east of Kennedy Road; completion 2022
- Sunnyside bridge – from Roncesvalles Avenue to Lake Ontario shoreline
- Wallace Avenue Footbridge – c. 1907 is a series of Warren truss sections on trestle like support structure spanning over railway tracks below; staircases sections on both ends have been replaced
- Woodsworth Road -Pedestrian bridge over CN tracks south of Highway 401 from the path leading from Woodsworth Road (Woodsworth Parkette) to GO Oriole station on the south side of eastbound 401 collectors
- Weston GO Station Pedestrian Bridge spans Lawrence Avenue West on the west side of the railway tracks

== Railway bridges ==
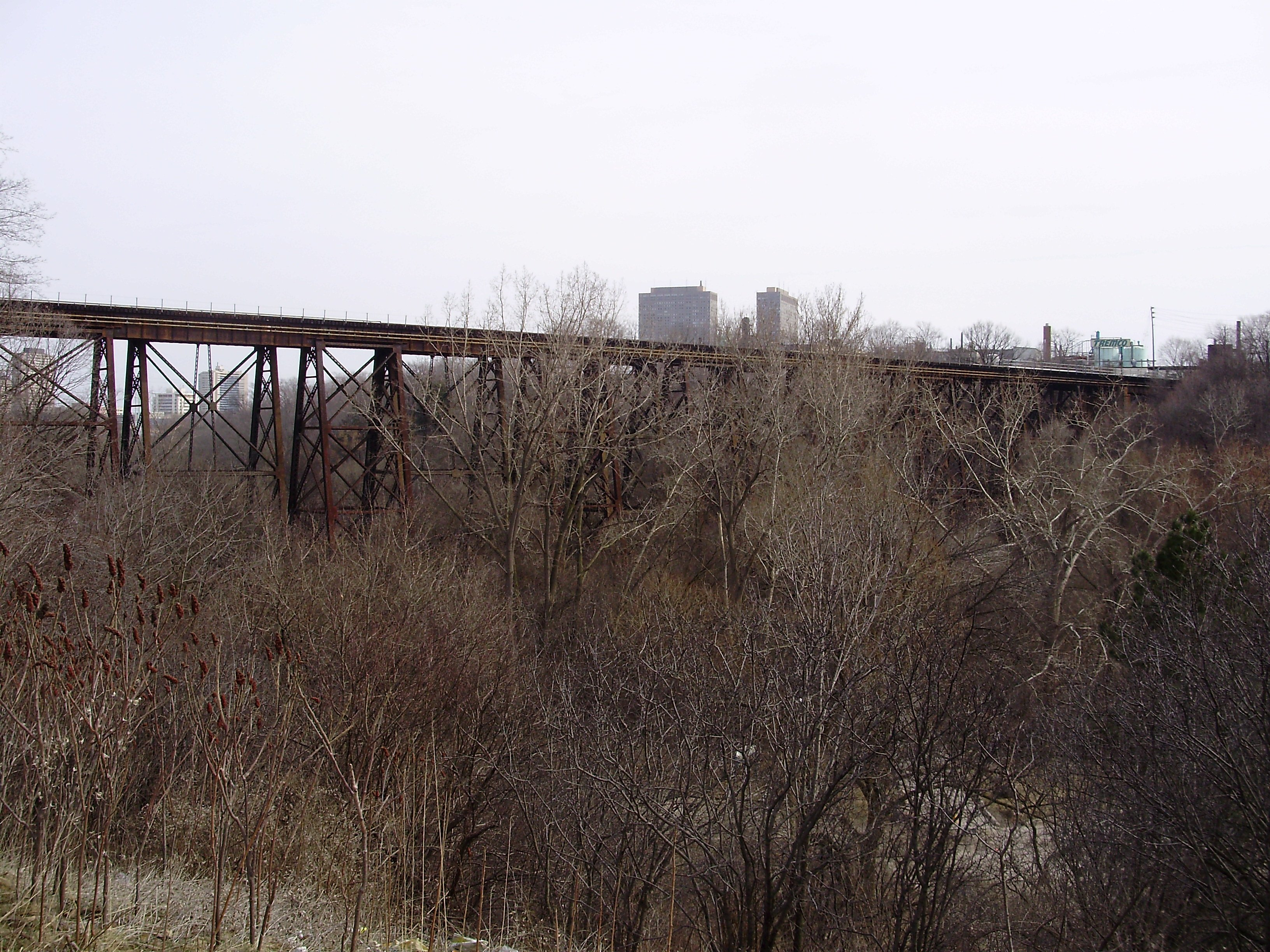
A railway bridge spanning Don River (west branch) and E.T. Seton Park, south of Eglinton Avenue East

- railway tracks over Bloor St W, east of Dundas St W.
- railway tracks over Bloor St W, east of Symington
- Transit train traffic* railway tracks over Wickett Creek south of Eglinton Avenue East and Leslie Street
- railway tracks over Wickett Creek east of Leslie Street on Eglinton Avenue East
- railway tracks over Baview Avenue at Don Valley Brick Works
- railway tracks over Rouge River at Lake Ontario
- railway tracks over Sheppard Avenue East between Brimley Road and Midland Avenue
- railway tracks over Rouge River at Morningside Heights
- railway tracks over Rouge River near Meadowvale Road and Plug Hat Road
- railway tracks over Humber River at Lambton Park
- railway tracks over Humber River between The Queensway and Gardiner Expressway
- railway tracks over Humber River at Old Mills Inn
- Weston CNR Bridge – c. 1856 box girder bridge for Grand Trunk Railway over Humber River at Weston Golf and Country Club
- railway tracks over Don Mills Road south of Barber Green Road
- steel box girder bridge carries CN freight and GO Transit commuter trains over Leslie Street south of Highway 401
- concrete bridge carries CN and GO Transit railway tracks over Finch Avenue East west of Leslie Street
- Lambton Credit Valley Railway/CPR Bridge – c. 1874 steel plate girder bridge over Humber River
- Indian Line CNR Bridge – c.1959–1965 and spans over Humber River
- 2 bridges – steel plate bridge over Eglinton Avenue East at Leslie Street and a long steel trestle over Don River and E.T. Seton Park south of Eglinton Avenue East and just east of Leslie Street ending just north of Wicksteed Avenue
- 2 bridges at intersection of Warden Avenue and Ellesmere Road CP rail tracks heading to Agincourt Yards
- 2 bridges St Clair Avenue East and Midland Avenue CN and GO tracks site of infamous GO train and TTC bus accident
- CN tracks over Black Creek Drive north of Weston Road
- CN tracks over Queen Street West between Gladstone Avenue and Dufferin Street
- Lakeshore CNR Bridge/Western Railway Bridge abutments c 1911 and 1890
- railway tracks over King Street Bridge c. 1888
- railway tracks over Keele Street Bridge c. 1891
- railway tracks over Lansdowne Avenue Bridge c. 1907
- Old Mill TTC Subway Bridge – c. 1968 concrete bridge carries Bloor subway line over Humber and located just south of Bloor Humber Bridge
- Steeles Railway Overpasses – carrying GO Transit Stouffville line over Steeles Avenue East just east of Kennedy Road; completion 2022

== Other bridges over waterways ==
Numerous bridges on the Toronto Islands including:

- Algonquin Island bridge – c. 1938 trestle bridge made of timber used for pedestrian traffic and plans for the current bridge to be replaced with a replica
- Centre Island Bridge (on Avenue of the Islands) metal brace spandrel arch pedestrian bridge built before 1896 and altered since; used by parks service vehicles with weight limitation
- Olympic Island Bridge (2) – concrete spandrel deck arch pedestrian bridge built sometime before 1910
- Chippewa Avenue Bridge -built around 1911 for Royal Canadian Yacht Club

=== Buried bridges ===
- Crawford Street Bridge
- Harbord Street Bridge

=== Lost bridges ===
- Lawrence Avenue Bridge – concrete bridge replaced by current overpass over DVP; bridge removed in conjunction with widening by 1963. East and west abutments are still present along Don River.
- Avenue Road Bridge – connecting Avenue Road to Yonge Street in 1929 was incorporated into Hogg's Hollow Bridge
- Yonge Street Bridge – steel truss bridge south of Hogg's Hollow (York Mills Road) carried Yonge Street traffic over West branch of the Don River and (North Yonge Railways ran on single track on the outer west side of bridge until 1948) until 1954 when it washed out during Hurricane Hazel. A temporary bailey bridge was built after November 1954 and now replaced by current overpass after May 1955.
- Raymore Park footbridge over Humber washed out by Hurricane Hazel and rebuilt. Since replaced by new bridge in 1995; old suspension bridge abutments are still present.
- Dowling Avenue Bridge and Dunn Avenue Bridge – Two plate girder bridges built in 1911 crossed over railway tracks north of the Gardiner Expressway torn down in 2016 and being replaced with new structures (temporary pedestrian only bridges to be built in the summer of 2016).
- Lakeshore Road Bridge – c. 1824 log bridge that spanned across Humber River replacing a ferry service c.1803
- Shaw Street Bridge – a wood bridge over Sully Crescent and Garrison Creek. Bridge removed and was filled in by the 1920s

== See also ==
- List of oldest buildings and structures in Toronto
