= Sewells Road Bridge =

- Sewells Road suspension bridge on a late fall afternoon
- Coordinates: 43°49′39″N 79°11′59″W
- Carries: single lane of traffic on Sewells Road
- Crosses: Rouge River
- Locale: Toronto, Ontario, Canada
- Maintained by: Toronto Transportation Services (1998-present); Scarborough Works Department (1912-1997)

Characteristics
- Design: Single-decked suspension bridge
- Total length: 50 metres (160 ft)
- Width: single lane
- Clearance above: 4.1 metres (13 ft)
- Clearance below: approximately 4.0 metres (13.1 ft)

History
- Opened: 1912

Location
- Interactive map of Sewells Road Bridge

Sewells Road Bridge is a single direction suspension bridge that carries vehicular traffic north and south on Sewells Road over the Rouge river in Toronto. The bridge is unique as it is one of only a few suspension bridges found in Ontario, and one of the shortest vehicular applications (most suspension bridges are used to span major waterways or valleys).

== History ==
Completed in 1912, it was designed by Milton born Toronto civil engineer James Franklin Barber (1876-1946) and Lewis Construction. It is the only suspension bridge in Toronto. The bridge likely provided the only means to cross the Rouge in north Scarborough when it was built. It is located not far from another important bridge crossing the Rouge, Old Finch Avenue Bailey Bridge.

== Current ==
The bridge remains in use (with restoration in 1981) and is listed in the city's list of historic structures (one of 15 bridges). Two single cables holds up the 50 metres (160 ft) bridge with loads under 5 tonnes (5.5 short tons) and is maintained by Toronto Transportation Services.

An historic plaque was added after 1981 to provide details on the bridge's history and unique value.

== See also ==
- Leaside Bridge - also designed by Barber
- Old (16th Avenue) Bailey Bridge

Sewells Road is one of only a few suspension bridges in Ontario:

- Ambassador Bridge
- Ogdensburg–Prescott International Bridge
- Thousand Islands Bridge
