= James Franklin Barber =

Canadian civil engineer

James Franklin Barber (1875–1946) was a Canadian civil engineer known for his craft in building road bridges in the early 20th Century. His bridges replaced older bridges not designed for cars and mostly for rural areas in the Greater Toronto Area.

== Life ==
Born in Milton, Ontario, Barber graduated from Mount Allison University and University of Toronto in mechanical engineering and studied later in civil engineering.

Most of his celebrated bridges were during his time as consultant for then York County, Ontario:

- Humber Bridge (1918) a concrete arch bridge in Vaughan (demolished 2020)
- Hunter Street/Ashburnham Bridge (1916) a spandrel deck arch bridge in Peterborough, Ontario near Quaker Oats factory
- Old Kirby Road / McEwan Bridge (1923) a bowstring truss in Vaughan
- Langstaff Road Bridge (1923) a bowstring truss bridge in Vaughan
- Leaside Bridge (1927) a Warren deck truss in East York
- Old Major Mackenzie Drive Bridge (1914) a bowstring truss bridge in Vaughan
- Middle Road Bridge (1910–1911) a bowstring truss bridge in Etobicoke
- Mossington / Blue Bridge (1912) a Pratt Through truss in Georgina, Ontario
- Old Mill Arch Bridge (1916) a bowstring truss in Toronto
- Sewells Road Bridge (1912) a suspension bridge in Scarborough, Ontario
