= 2017 Mumbai stampede =

Stampede which took place in Mumbai

Elphinstone Road Stampede
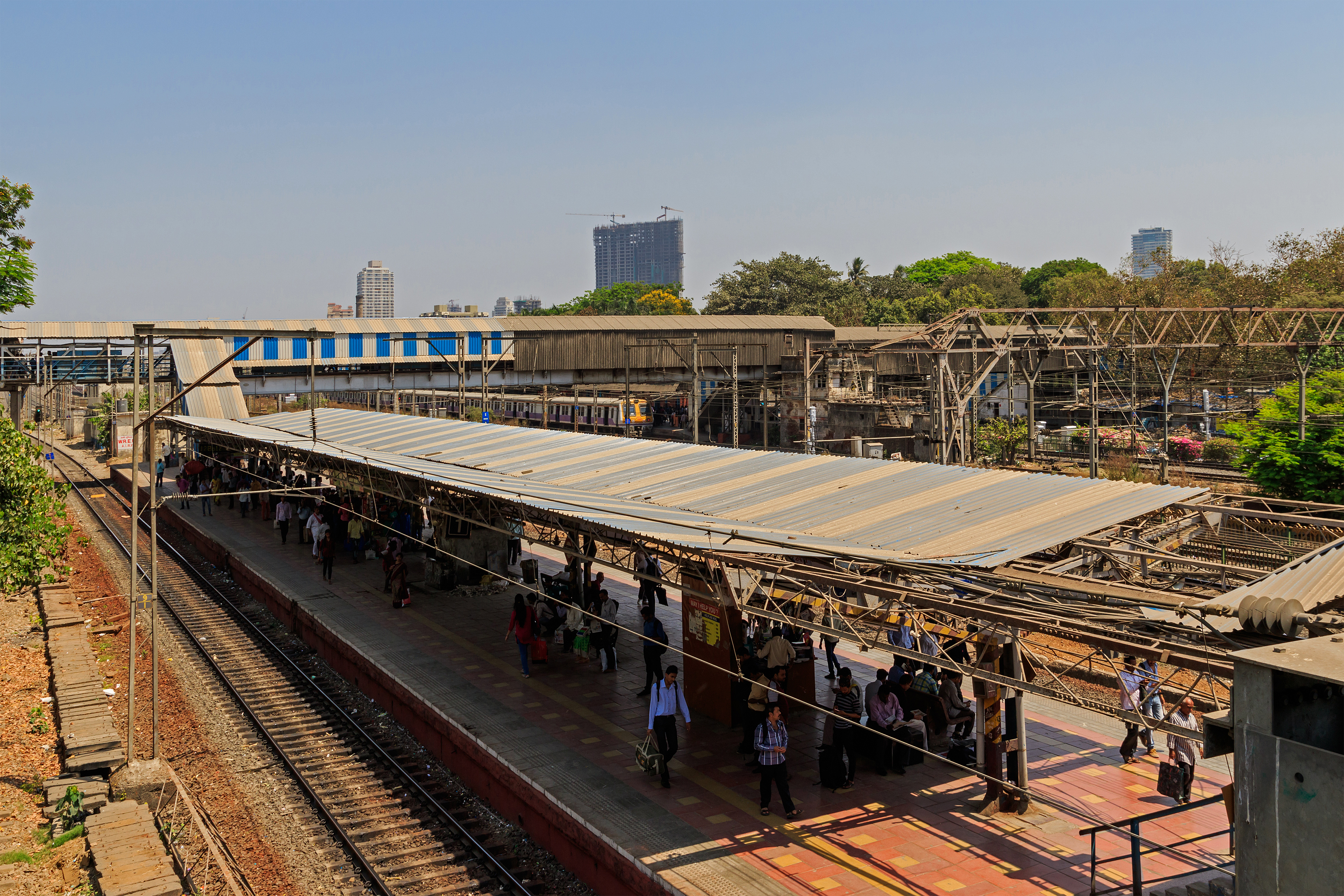
- Elphinstone Road Station shown in March 2016
- Date: 29 September 2017
- Location: Elphinstone Road railway station Mumbai, India; 19.007533°N 72.835976°E
- Cause: Overcrowding of Pedestrian foot over bridge
- Deaths: 23 to 27
- Injuries: 50
- Inquiries: High-level Enquiry
- Inquest: Chief Safety Officer of Western Railways Government of Maharashtra Ministry of Railways

On 29 September 2017, a stampede occurred at the suburban Elphinstone Road railway station in Mumbai, India. At least 23 people were killed and 39 others injured. The incident took place between the Parel railway station and Elphinstone road railway station.

== Incident ==
On the morning of 29 September 2017, around 10:30am local time, a stampede erupted on a footbridge at the suburban Elphinstone road railway station in Mumbai which connects two of the city's major suburban lines.

== Cause ==
The incident occurred during the morning rush hour at Elphinstone road station, when four trains arrived simultaneously at the station. It was raining at the time and there were already numerous people crammed into the narrow bridge. Someone may have slipped and fell when passengers resumed their travel after the rain, leading to the stampede.

A rumour that the pedestrian bridge was collapsing may have caused passengers to surge forwards to flee. According to a witness, the situation worsened as police and emergency officials did not respond immediately or enforce crowd control measures.

At least 23 people died and 39 others were injured in the stampede. According to a hospital's official, most of the people who died suffered from chest compression and haemorrhage due to injuries.

== Police investigation ==
"The overbridge of Elphinstone station was overcrowded and due to rain it got slippery too. This caused panic and resulted in the stampede," said Atul Shrivastav, IG of the Railway Protection Force. A case of Accidental Death (ADR), was registered at the Dadar Police Station. S. Jaykumar, Additional Commissioner of Police (Central Region), Mumbai also stated that overcrowding was a factor.

== Reactions ==
Piyush Goyal, the then Minister of Railways, announced a compensation of ₨.10 lakh or about $15,200 for the victims.

President of India, Ram Nath Kovind expressed grief over the "loss of lives in the stampede in Mumbai". Prime Minister Narendra Modi expressed his condolences to "all those who have lost their lives due to the stampede in Mumbai", in a tweet.

Venkaiah Naidu, the Vice President; Devendra Fadnavis, Chief Minister of Maharashtra; Mamata Banerjee, Chief Minister of West Bengal and opposition leader Rahul Gandhi also expressed condolences over the deaths caused by the stampede.

Shiv Sena called the stampede "a public massacre of the people by the government".

Many Indians took to social media and called out the government for spending on projects such as a new bullet train from Mumbai to Ahmedabad in Gujarat, instead of focusing on basic infrastructure. Many media reports criticised the infrastructure in the station and reported the incident as a tragedy which was "waiting to happen". MNS chief Raj Thackeray warned PM that he would not allow a single brick to be placed for the bullet train in Mumbai, until the infrastructure of local railways was made better.

In the aftermath, railway minister Piyush Goyal said that the government has ordered a probe into the incident. He also ordered a safety and capacity audit of all foot over-bridges at suburban stations across Mumbai.

In February 2018, the Indian Army opened three new Bailey bridge footbridges at Elphinstone Road, Currey Road and Ambivli. These were erected quickly, in response to the stampede.
