= Bailey bridge =

Type of portable truss bridge

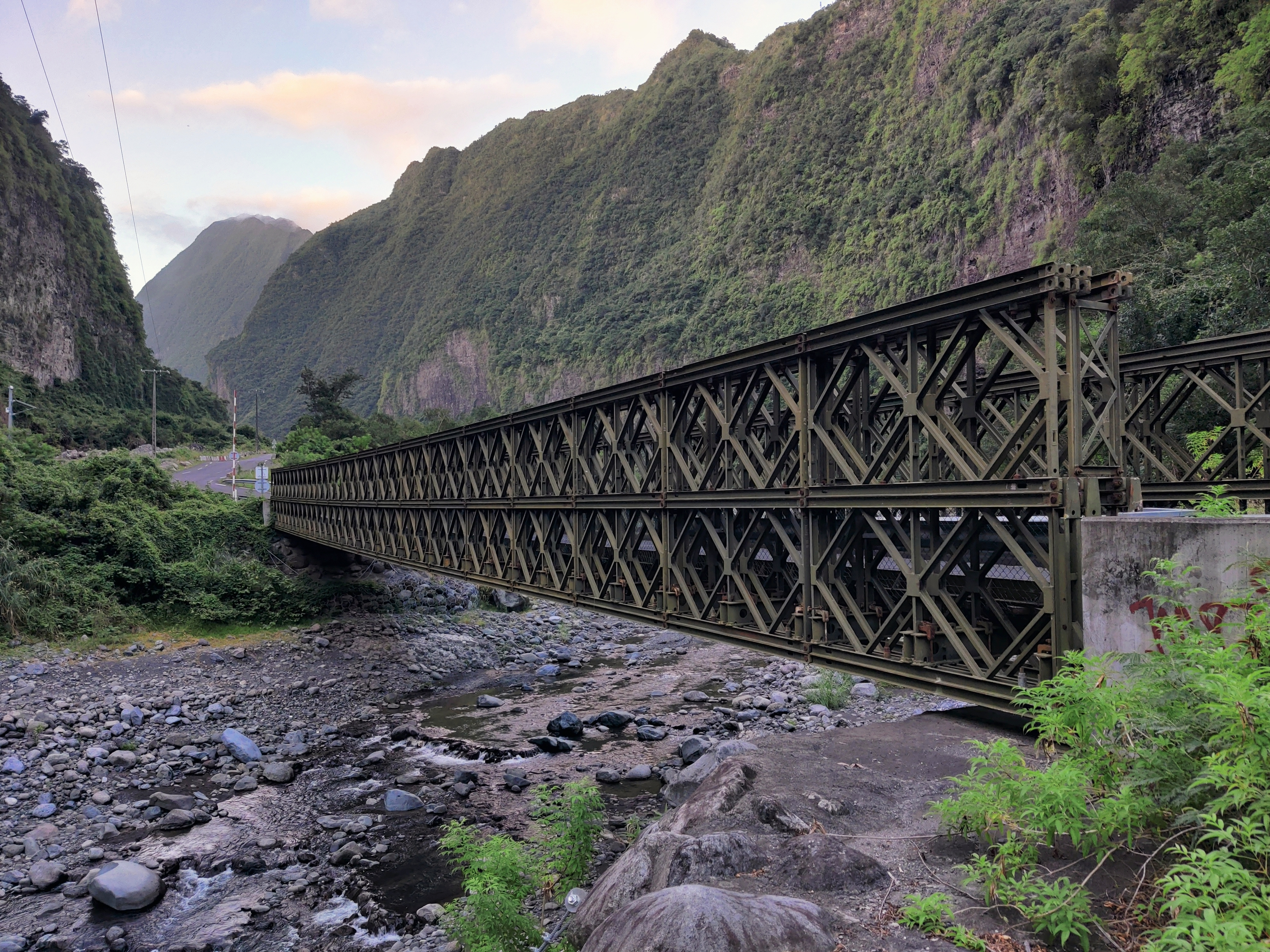
- Bailey Bridge on the Route de Cilaos (N5), La Réunion, directly north of Ilet Furcy.
- Span range: Short
- Material: Timber, steel
- Movable: No
- Design effort: Low
- Falsework required: None

A Bailey bridge is a type of portable, pre-fabricated, truss bridge. It was developed in 1940–1941 by the British for military use during the Second World War and saw extensive use by British, Canadian and American military engineering units. An advantage of the Bailey bridge is its ease of assembly. Its structural components are factory-welded, while field joints are simply bolted or pinned without the need for special tools or heavy equipment. The wood and steel bridge elements were small and light enough to be carried in trucks and lifted into place by hand, without the use of a crane. These bridges were strong enough to carry tanks. Bailey bridges continue to be used extensively in civil engineering construction projects and to provide temporary crossings for pedestrian and vehicle traffic.

== History ==
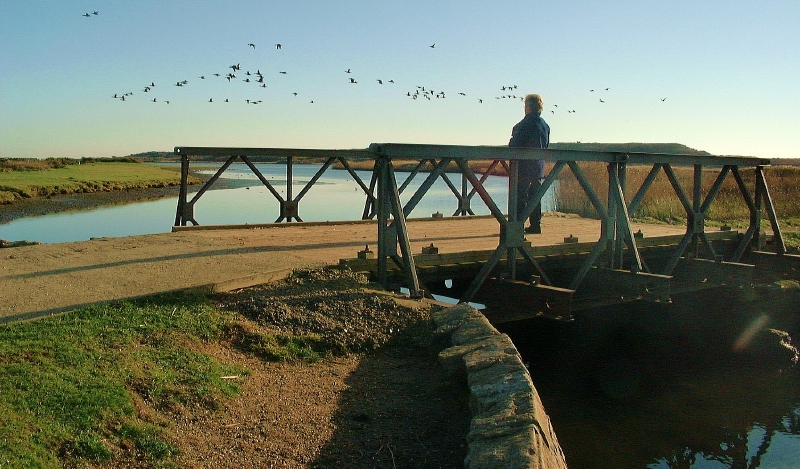
Prototype Bailey bridge at Stanpit Marsh in Dorset

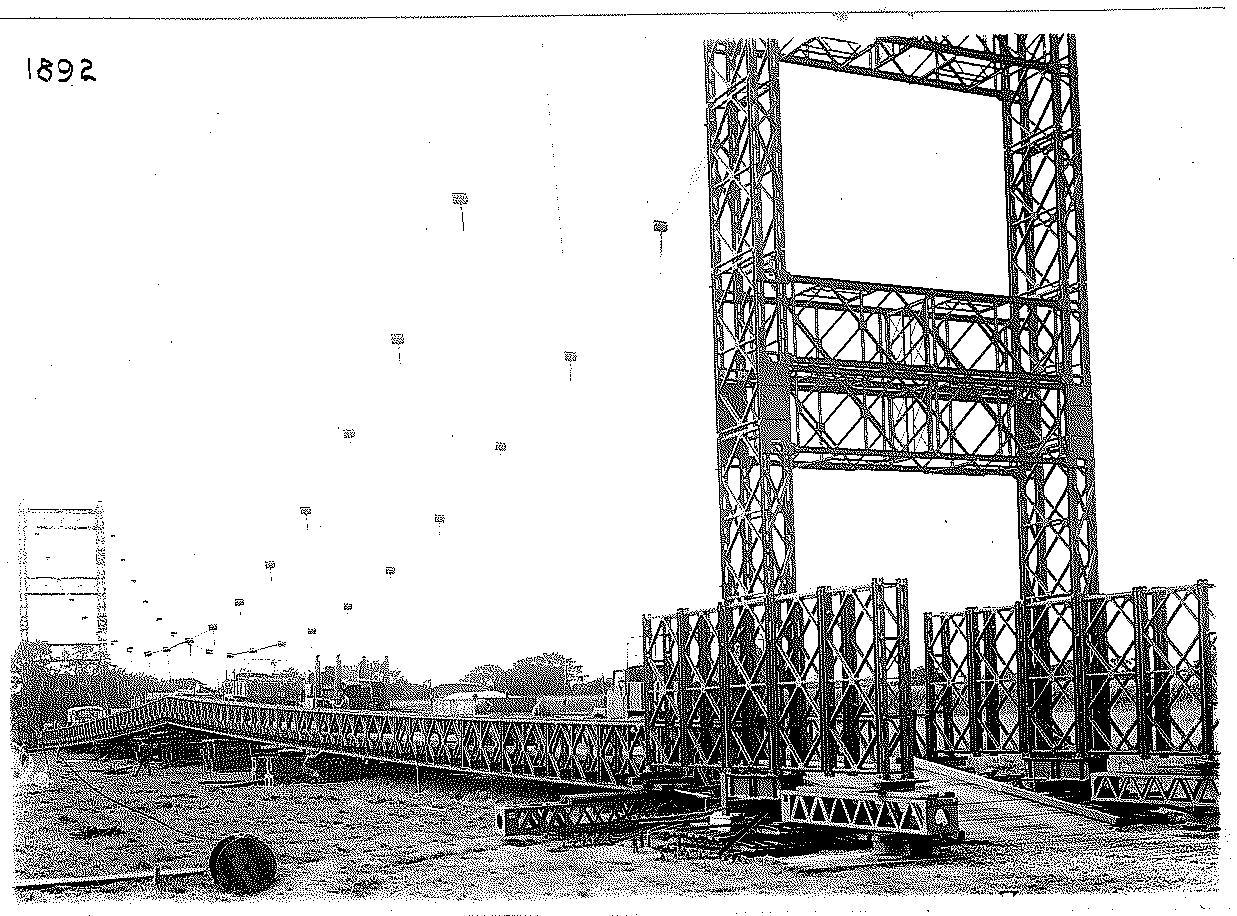
Bailey bridge undergoing trials in Christchurch, Dorset

Donald Bailey was a civil servant in the British War Office who tinkered with model bridges as a hobby. He had proposed an early prototype for a Bailey bridge before the war in 1936, but the idea was not acted upon. Bailey drew an original proposal for the bridge on the back of an envelope in 1940. On 14 February 1941, the Ministry of Supply requested that Bailey have a full-scale prototype completed by 1 May. Work on the bridge was completed with particular support from Ralph Freeman. The design was tested at the Experimental Bridging Establishment (EBE), in Christchurch, Dorset, with several parts from Braithwaite & Co., beginning in December 1940 and ending in 1941. The first prototype was tested in 1941. For early tests, the bridge was laid across a field, about 2 feet (0.61 m) above the ground, and several Mark V tanks were filled with pig iron and stacked upon each other.

The prototype of this was used to span Mother Siller's Channel, which cuts through the nearby Stanpit Marshes, an area of marshland at the confluence of the River Avon and the River Stour. It remains there ( 50°43′31″N 1°45′44″W) as a functioning bridge. Full production began in July 1941. Thousands of workers and over 650 firms, including Littlewoods, were engaged in making the bridge, with production eventually rising to 25,000 bridge panels a month. The first Bailey bridges were in military service by December 1941, Bridges in the other formats were built, temporarily, to cross the Avon and Stour in the meadows nearby. After successful development and testing, the bridge was taken into service by the Corps of Royal Engineers and first used in North Africa in 1942. US patent number 2,376,023 was filed on 11 January 1943.

The original design violated a patent on the Callender-Hamilton bridge. The designer of that bridge, A. M. Hamilton, successfully applied to the Royal Commission on Awards to Inventors. The Bailey Bridge was more easily constructed, but less portable than the Hamilton bridge. Hamilton was awarded £4,000 in 1936 by the War Office for the use of his early bridges and the Royal Commission on Awards to Inventors awarded him £10,000 in 1954 for the use, mainly in Asia, of his later bridges. Lieutenant General Sir Giffard Le Quesne Martel was awarded £500 for infringement on the design of his box girder bridge, the Martel bridge. Bailey was later knighted for his invention, and awarded £12,000.

=== Use in the Second World War ===
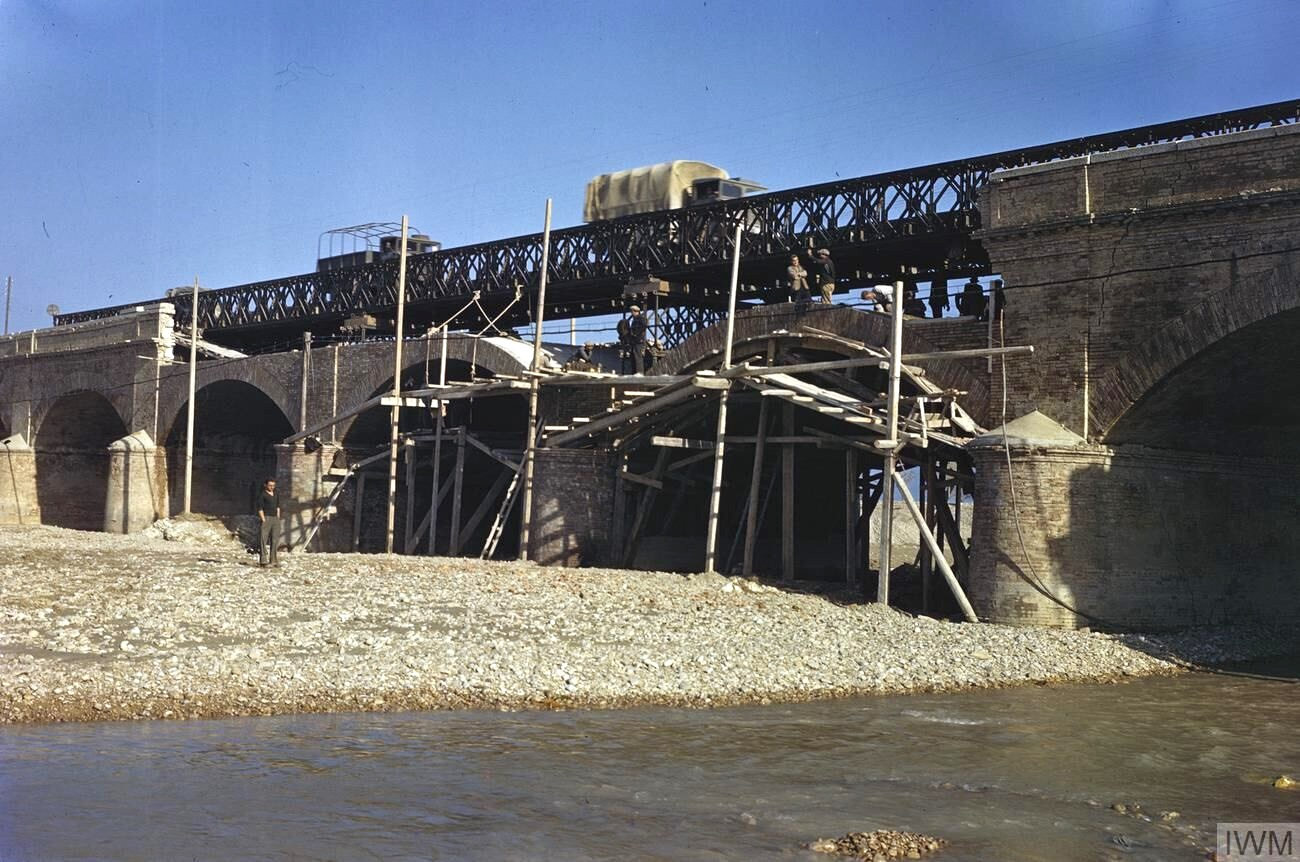
Allied military traffic crosses a Bailey bridge, spanning a damaged section of a masonry arch bridge. At the same time, local workers are rebuilding the original bridge. Italy 1944

The first operational Bailey bridge during the Second World War was built by 237 Field Company R.E. over the Medjerda River near Medjez el Bab in Tunisia on the night of 26 November 1942. The first Bailey bridge built under fire was constructed at Leonforte by members of the 3rd Field Company, Royal Canadian Engineers. The Americans soon adopted the Bailey bridge technique, calling it the Portable Panel Bridge. In early 1942, the United States Army Corps of Engineers initially awarded contracts to the Detroit Steel Products Company, the American Elevator Company and the Commercial Shearing and Stamping Company, and later several others.

The Bailey provided a solution to the problem of German and Italian armies destroying bridges as they retreated. By the end of the war, the US Fifth Army and British 8th Army had built over 3,000 Bailey bridges in Sicily and Italy alone, totaling over 55 miles (89 km) of bridge, at an average length of 100 feet (30 m). One Bailey, built to replace the Sangro River bridge in Italy, spanned 1,126 feet (343 m). Another on the Chindwin River in Burma, spanned 1,154 feet (352 m). Such long bridges required support from either piers or pontoons.

A number of bridges were available by 1944 for D-Day, when production was accelerated. The US also licensed the design and started rapid construction for their own use. A Bailey Bridge constructed over the River Rhine at Rees, Germany, in 1945 by the Royal Canadian Engineers was named "Blackfriars Bridge", and, at 555 m (1814 ft) including the ramps at each end, was then the longest Bailey bridge ever constructed. In all, over 600 firms were involved in the making of over 200 miles of bridges composing of 500,000 tons, or 700,000 panels of bridging during the war. At least 2,500 Bailey bridges were built in Italy, and another 2,000 elsewhere.

Field Marshal Bernard Montgomery wrote in 1947:

Bailey Bridging made an immense contribution towards ending World War II. As far as my own operations were concerned, with the eighth Army in Italy and with the 21 Army Group in North West Europe, I could never have maintained the speed and tempo of forward movement without large supplies of Bailey Bridging.

=== Post-war applications ===
The Skylark launch tower at Woomera was built up of Bailey bridge components. In the years immediately following World War II, the Ontario Hydro-Electric Power Commission purchased huge amounts of war-surplus Bailey bridging from the Canadian War Assets Corporation. The commission used bridging in an office building. Over 200,000 tons of bridging were used in a hydroelectric project. The Ontario government was, several years after World War II, the largest holder of Bailey Bridging components. After World War II and especially post Hurricane Hazel in 1954, some of the bridging was used to construct replacement bridges in the Toronto area:

- 16th Avenue Bailey Bridge c. 1945
- Lake Shore Boulevard Bailey Bridge was built in 1952 for Ontario Hydro
- Old Finch Avenue Bailey Bridge, built by the 2nd Field Engineer Regiment, is the last still in use.

The longest Bailey bridge was put into service in October 1975. This 788-metre (2,585 ft), two-lane bridge crossed the Derwent River at Hobart, Australia. The Bailey bridge was in use until the reconstruction of the Tasman Bridge was completed on 8 October 1977. Bailey bridges are in regular use throughout the world, particularly as a means of bridging in remote regions. In 2018, the Indian Army erected three new footbridges at Elphinstone Road, a commuter railway station in Mumbai, and at Currey Road and Ambivli. These were erected quickly, in response to a stampede some months earlier, where 23 people died. The United States Army Corps of Engineers uses Bailey Bridges in construction projects, including an emergency replacement bridge on the Hana Highway in Hawaii. Two temporary Bailey bridges have been used on the northern span of the Dufferin Street bridges in Toronto since 2014.

After a flood in 1980, the town of Port Hope in Ontario, Canada installed a Bailey bridge in 1984. While originally meant to be a temporary measure, the bridge remained in place, as the “Barrett Street Bridge” until 2017, when the 32nd Combat Engineer Regiment of the Royal Canadian Armed Forces demolished and removed the bridge for the municipality. The bridge has since been replaced with a modern two lane bridge (an improvement over the single lane Bailey Bridge), at a cost of C$1.6 million, with the province of Ontario covering 50% of the cost.

The first Bailey Bridge built for civilian use in India was on the Pamba river in a place called Ranni in Pathanamthitta district of the state of Kerala. It was on 1996 November 08.

In 2017 the Irish Army built a Bailey bridge to replace a road bridge across the Cabry River, in County Donegal, after the original bridge was destroyed in floods.

In 2021 a Bailey bridge was built across the river Dijle in Rijmenam (Belgium) for the transportation of excavated soil from one side to the other of the river. The bridge allowed the trucks to cross the river without having to pass the city center.

In March 2021, the Michigan Department of Transportation constructed a Bailey bridge on M-30 to temporarily reconnect the highway after the old structure was destroyed in the May 2020 flooding and subsequent failure of the Edenville Dam. The department will replace the temporary bridge with a permanent structure in the coming years.

Following the 2023 Auckland Anniversary Weekend floods and Cyclone Gabrielle in the North Island of New Zealand, Bailey bridges were installed to reconnect communities.

Following the 2023 floods in Madrid, Spain, the Spanish Army is set to build a Bailey bridge in the village of Aldea del Fresno.

In 2024, following the catastrophic landslides in Kerala’s Wayanad district, the Indian Army built a 190 feet Bailey bridge in the village of Mundakkai.

In 2025, during 2025 Bahía Blanca floods, Argentine Army installed two Bailey bridges to reconnect the two halves of the city.

== Design ==
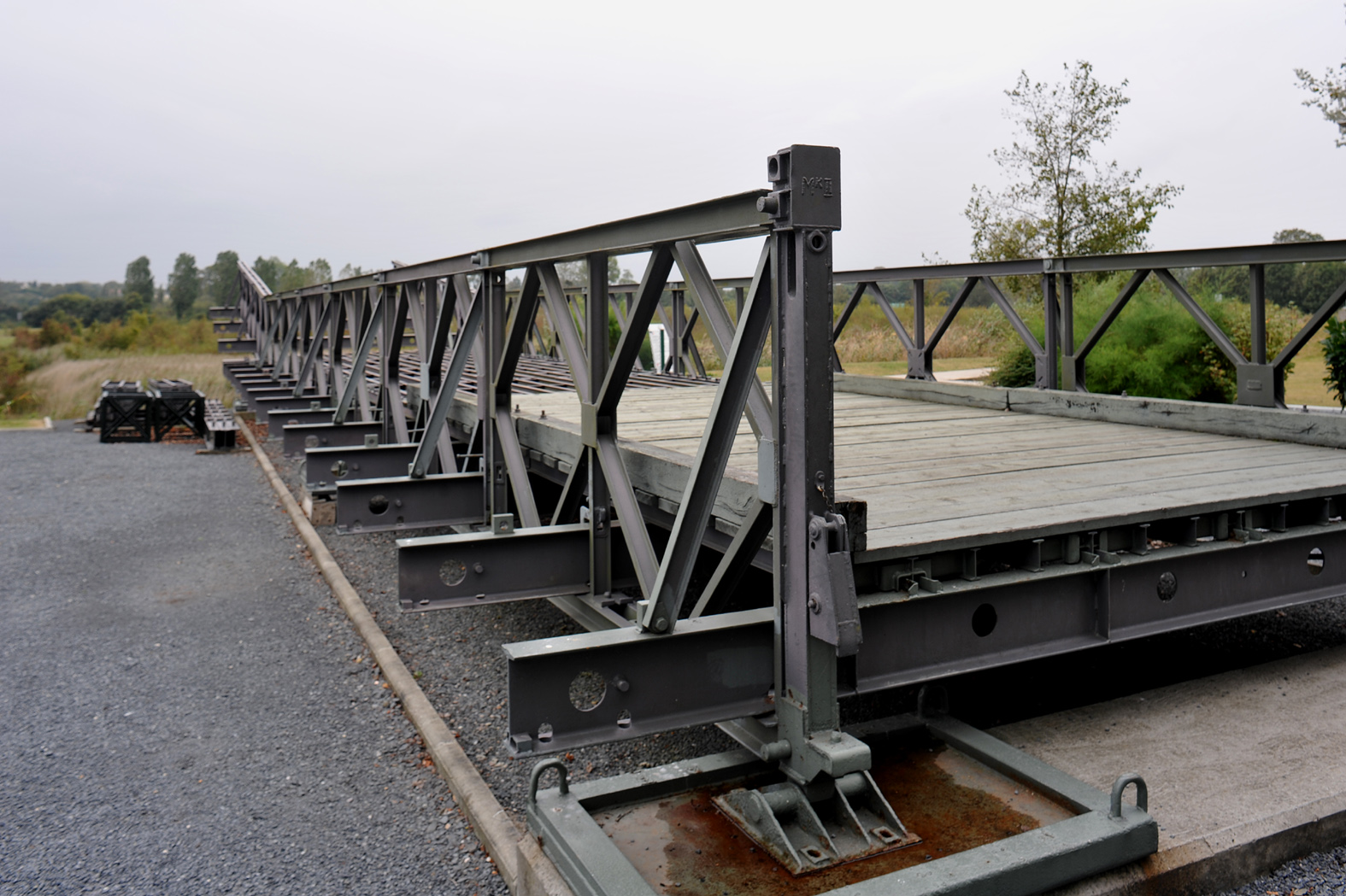
The transoms, side-panels and stringers of a Bailey bridge section at the Memorial Pegasus museum in Ranville, Calvados, France, can all be clearly seen

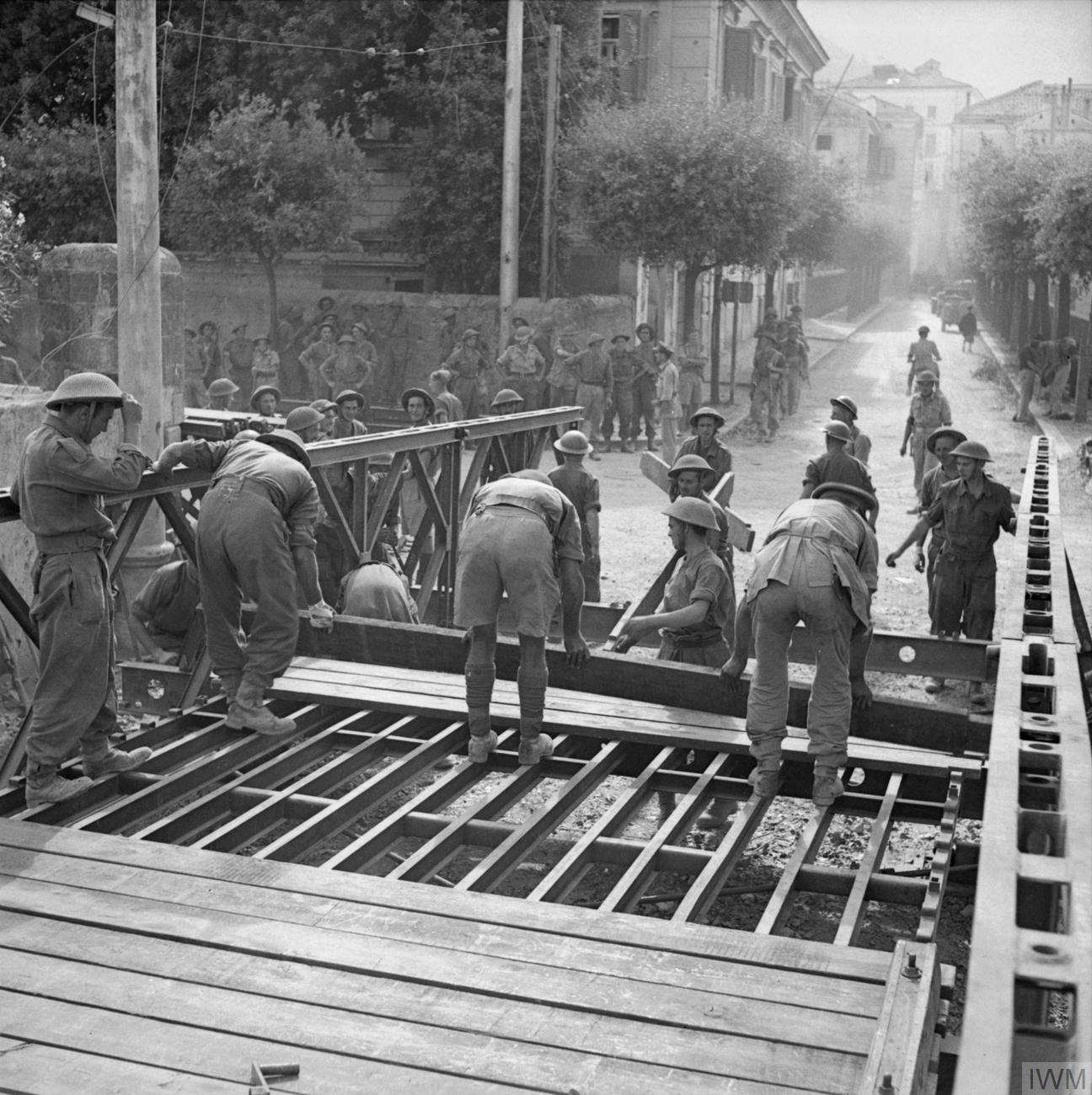
Royal Engineers construct a Bailey bridge in Italy, September 1943. Wood planks are being laid over the stringers to construct the roadbed

The success of the Bailey bridge was due to the simplicity of the fabrication and assembly of its modular components, combined with the ability to erect and deploy sections with a minimum of assistance from heavy equipment. Many previous designs for military bridges required cranes to lift the pre-assembled bridge and lower it into place. The Bailey parts were made of standard steel alloys, and were simple enough that parts made at a number of different factories were interchangeable. Each individual part could be carried by a small number of men, enabling army engineers to move more easily and quickly, in preparing the way for troops and materiel advancing behind them. The modular design allowed engineers to build each bridge to be as long and as strong as needed, doubling or tripling the supportive side panels, or on the roadbed sections.

The basic bridge consists of three main parts. The bridge's strength is provided by the panels on the sides. The panels are 10-foot-long (3.0 m), 5-foot-high (1.5 m), cross-braced rectangles that each weigh 570 pounds (260 kg), and can be lifted by four men. The panel was constructed of welded steel. The top and bottom chord of each panel had interlocking male and female lugs into which engineers could insert panel connecting pins.

The floor of the bridge consists of a number of 19-foot-wide (5.8 m) transoms that run across the bridge, with 10-foot-long (3.0 m) stringers running between them, and over the top of the transoms, forming a square. Transoms rest on the lower chord of the panels, and clamps hold them together. Stringers are placed atop the completed structural frame, and wood planking (chesses) are placed atop the stringers to provide a roadbed. Ribands bolt the planking to the stringers. Later in the war, the wooden planking was covered by steel plates, which were more resistant to damage from tank tracks.

Each unit constructed in this fashion creates a single 10-foot-long (3.0 m) section of bridge, with a 12-foot-wide (3.7 m) roadbed. After one section is complete it is typically pushed forward over rollers on the bridgehead, and another section built behind it. The two are then connected together with pins pounded into holes in the corners of the panels.

For added strength up to three panels (and transoms) can be bolted on either side of the bridge. Another solution is to stack the panels vertically. With three panels across and two high, the Bailey Bridge can support tanks over a 200-foot span (61 m). Footways can be installed on the outside of the side-panels. The side-panels form an effective barrier between foot and vehicle traffic, allowing pedestrians to safely use the bridge.

A useful feature of the Bailey bridge is its ability to be launched from one side of a gap, without a need for any equipment or personnel on the far bank. In this system the front-most portion of the bridge is angled up with short "launch-links" to form a "launching nose" and most of the bridge is left without the roadbed and ribands. The bridge is placed on rollers and simply pushed across the gap, using manpower or a truck or tracked vehicle, at which point the roller is removed (with the help of jacks) and the ribands and roadbed installed, along with any additional panels and transoms that might be needed.

During WWII, Bailey bridge parts were made by companies with little experience of this kind of engineering. Although the parts were simple, they had to be precisely manufactured to fit correctly, so they were assembled into a test jig at each factory to verify this. To do this efficiently, newly manufactured parts would be continuously added to the test bridge, while at the same time the far end of the test bridge was continuously dismantled and the parts dispatched to the end-users.

== See also ==
- AM 50 – Czech assault bridge
- Armoured vehicle-launched bridge – Military engineering vehicle
- Mabey Logistic Support Bridge – Portable prefabricated truss bridge
- Medium Girder Bridge – Modular military bridge
- Military engineer – Building and maintaining structures and systems for armies
- PLA Navy landing barges
- Pontoon bridge – Type of floating bridge

== Bibliography ==
- Harpur, Brian (1991-01-01). A Bridge to Victory: The Untold Story of the Bailey Bridge. H.M. Stationery Office. ISBN 9780117726505.
- Bailey bridge. Technical manual; TM 5-277. Washington, D.C.: Department of the Army. 1972.
- Sanders, Gold V. (1944). "Push-Over Bridges Built Like Magic from Interlocking Parts". Popular Science. pp. 94–98.
- Joshi, MR (2008). Military Bridging (PDF). Defence Research & Development Organisation. Archived (PDF) from the original on 2021-10-25.
