= Ogdensburg–Prescott International Bridge =

International bridge between New York and Ontario

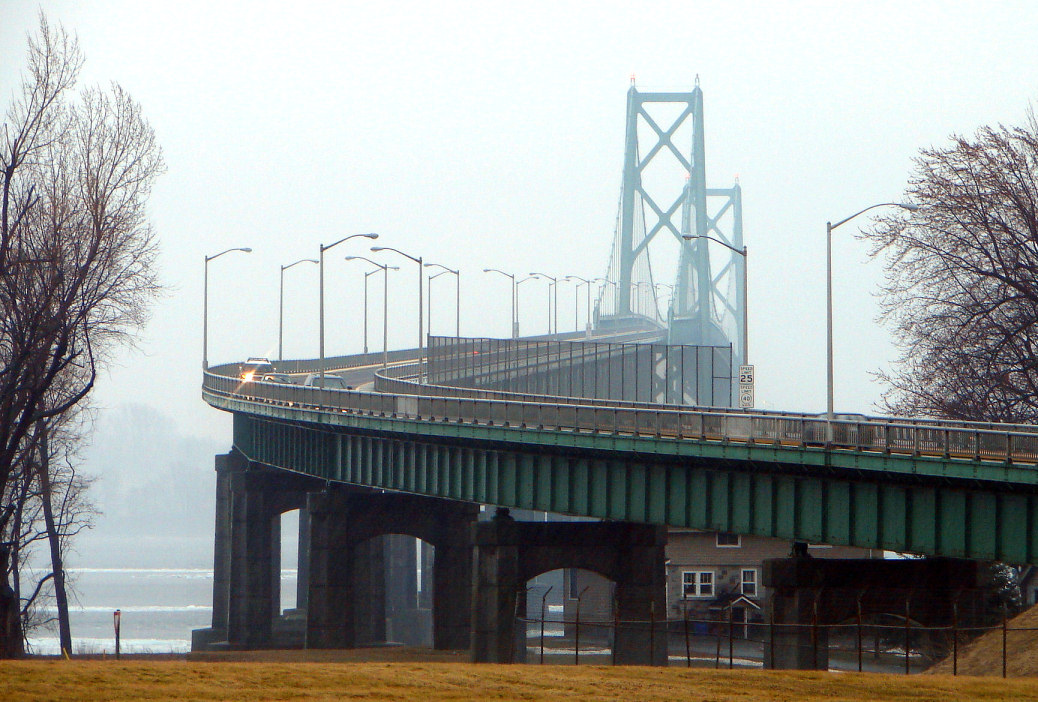
- Coordinates: 44°44′07″N 75°27′34″W
- Carries: NY 812 / Highway 16
- Crosses: Saint Lawrence River/Saint Lawrence Seaway
- Owner: Ogdensburg Bridge and Port Authority
- Website: www.ogdensport.com
- Preceded by: Thousand Islands Bridge
- Followed by: Three Nations Crossing

Characteristics
- Design: Suspension bridge
- Total length: 1.5 miles (2.4 km)
- Longest span: 1,150.8 feet (350.8 m)
- No. of spans: 6 deck and 1 Main w/ US & Canadian approaches.

History
- Construction end: 1960

Statistics
- Toll: $3.25 USD

Location
- Interactive map of Ogdensburg–Prescott International Bridge

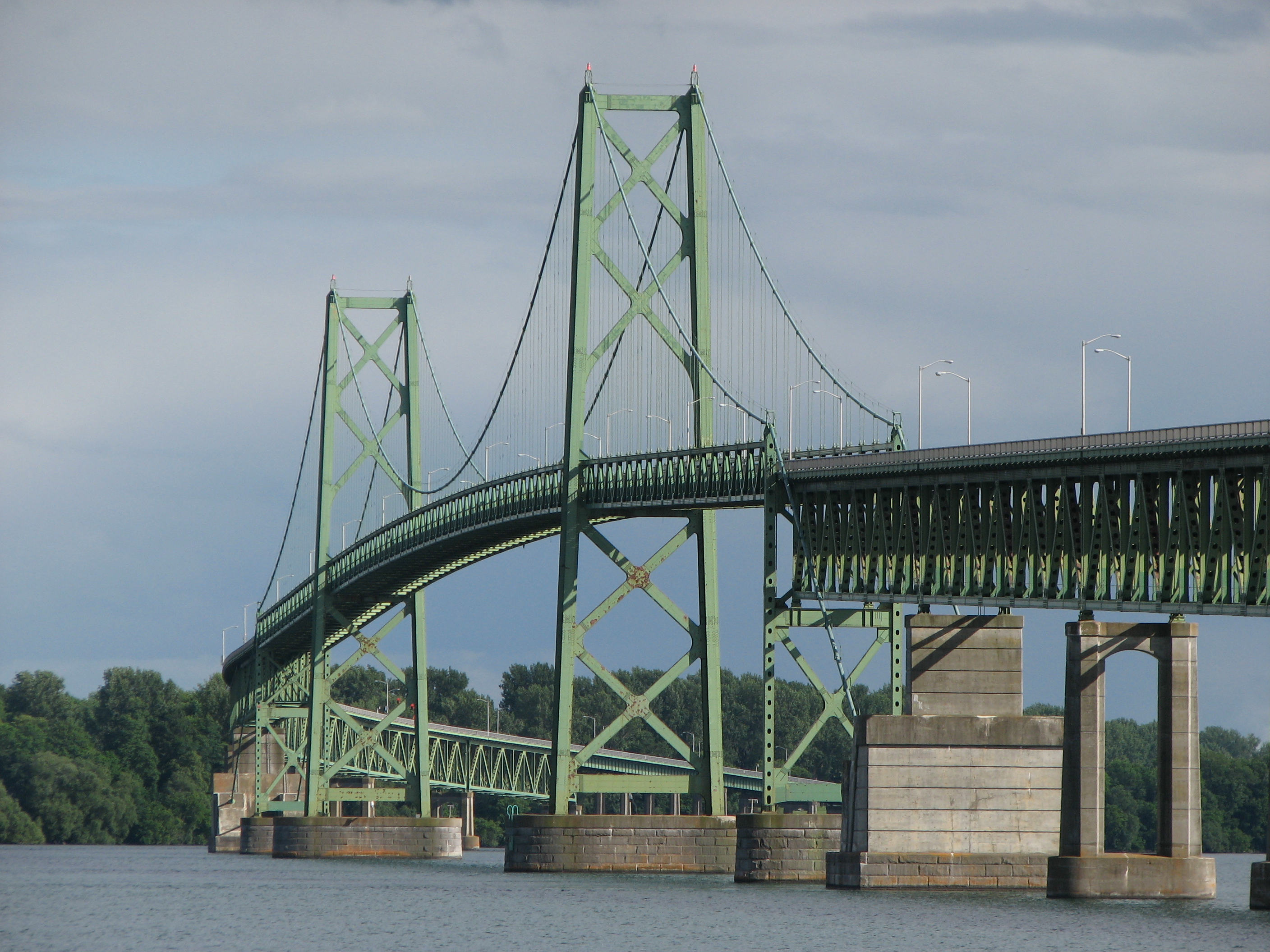
Ogdensburg–Prescott International Bridge

The Ogdensburg–Prescott International Bridge (also known as the St. Lawrence Bridge and the Seaway Skyway) is a suspension bridge connecting Ogdensburg, New York, in the United States to Johnstown, Ontario (a few kilometres east of Prescott) in Canada. Designed by Modjeski & Masters and completed in 1960, it has six spans and a main span of 350.75 metres (1,150.8 ft) totaling 2.4 kilometres (1.5 mi) across the Saint Lawrence River and Saint Lawrence Seaway. The bridge is owned and operated by the Ogdensburg Bridge and Port Authority, which also owns and operates Ogdensburg International Airport, the Port of Ogdensburg-Marine Terminal Facility, Commerce Park, the Port of Waddington, a medium-heavy industrial park and two short line railroads. The Ogdensburg Bridge and Port Authority is a New York State public-benefit corporation.

== Accessibility ==
The Ogdensburg–Prescott International Bridge allows for both passenger and commercial vehicles to cross the Canada-United States border; neither cyclists nor pedestrians are permitted to cross this bridge. The bridge is a very popular border crossing for passenger vehicles due to its proximity to Ottawa on the Canadian side, with 410,000 vehicles crossing in 2011 alone. The bridge was designed for heavy loads and has a weight capacity of 105,000 pounds (48,000 kg). The weight limit easily accommodates semi-trailer trucks. This bridge, however, does not see as much commercial traffic as the nearby Thousand Islands Bridge, as it is not a direct route to any US interstate highway.

On the Canadian side, the bridge connects to Highway 16, a highway which interchanges with Highway 401 and Highway 416 that continues north to Ottawa.

On the US side, the bridge connects to New York State Route 812, which connects with New York State Route 37 a few blocks from the southern end. Route 812 joins Route 37 west into Ogdensburg. It then goes south to the Village of Lowville in Lewis County. Route 37 continues west to a fork at Morristown, New York, where Route 12 picks up to Alexandria Bay and Interstate 81.

== Border crossing ==
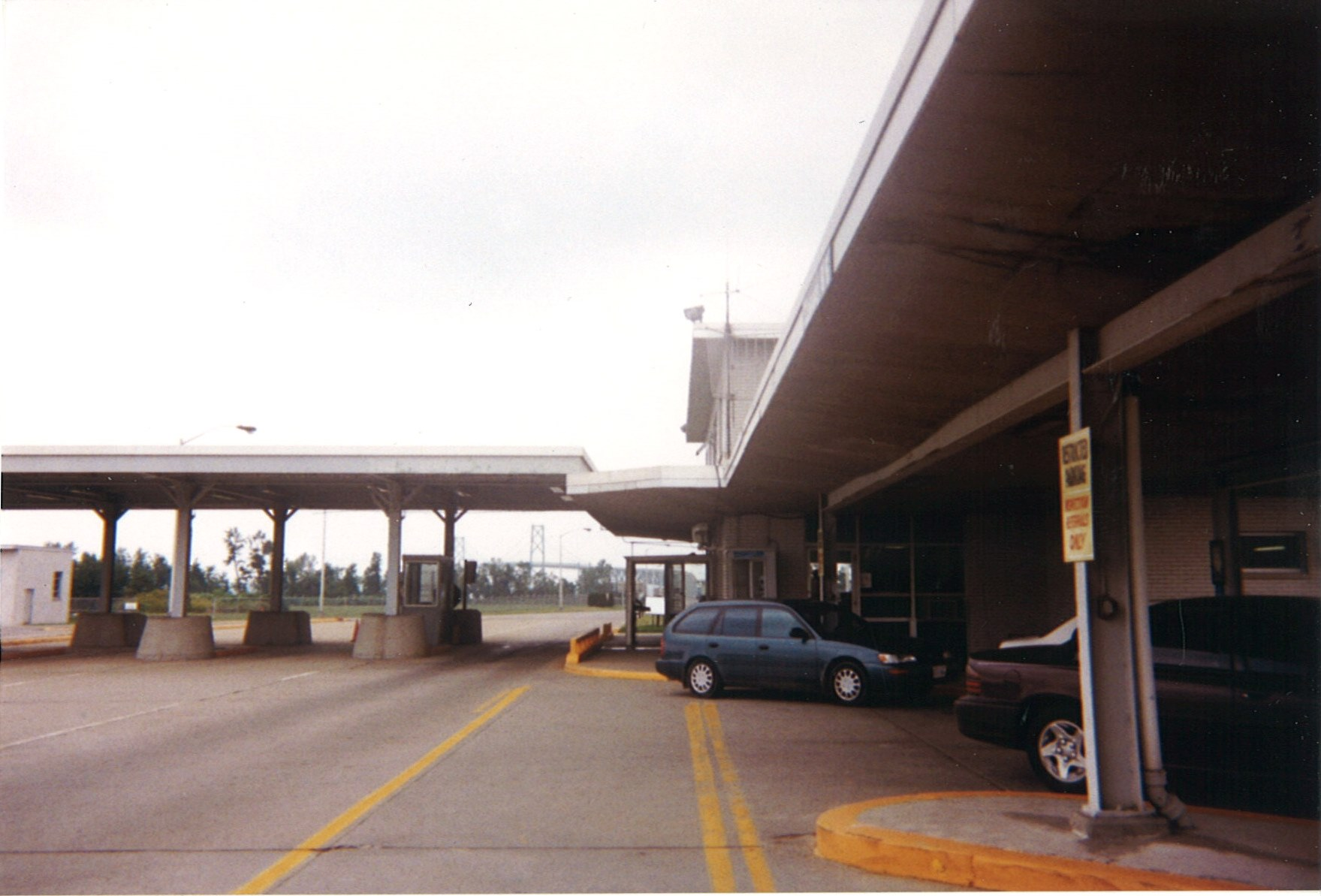
US Border Inspection Station at the bridge, as seen in 1998

The Ogdensburg–Prescott Border Crossing connects the cities of Ogdensburg, New York, and Johnstown, Ontario, on the Canada–United States border, and is located at the bridge. Even though it is located 3 miles (5 km) northeast of the cities, the bridge and the border crossing are named for Ogdensburg and Prescott because they were intended to replace ferry service between the two cities when the bridge was built in 1960. Prior to 1960, vessels crossed between Ogdensburg and Prescott (and border inspections were conducted) since 1800. Between 1858 and 1970, an international rail ferry was operated where rail cars were loaded onto vessels and ferried between Ogdensburg and Prescott.

The US border inspection station shown in the photo was built in 1960. The inspection canopy was replaced, and the building significantly upgraded and expanded in 2004. The Canada border station was replaced in 2012.

== Events ==
On 1 September 2015, the Ogdensburg–Prescott International Bridge made headlines after Prime Minister Stephen Harper posted a video to his Facebook page standing in front of the bridge and the Port of Johnstown. The video was supposed to be a congratulatory video about the shipbuilding industry in the Halifax Harbour in Halifax, Nova Scotia, but upon its release, locals of Halifax noticed inconsistencies with the scenery compared to that of the Halifax harbour and began to question where the video was actually shot. By 5 September, viewers had determined the video was actually shot in Johnstown, Ontario, based on the quick shot of the port in the background, which was unmistakably the Port of Johnstown. Viewers then accused Harper of trying to pass off the scenery as the Halifax harbour due to the undeniable similarities between the Ogdensburg–Prescott bridge and the A. Murray MacKay Bridge in the Halifax harbour.

== See also ==
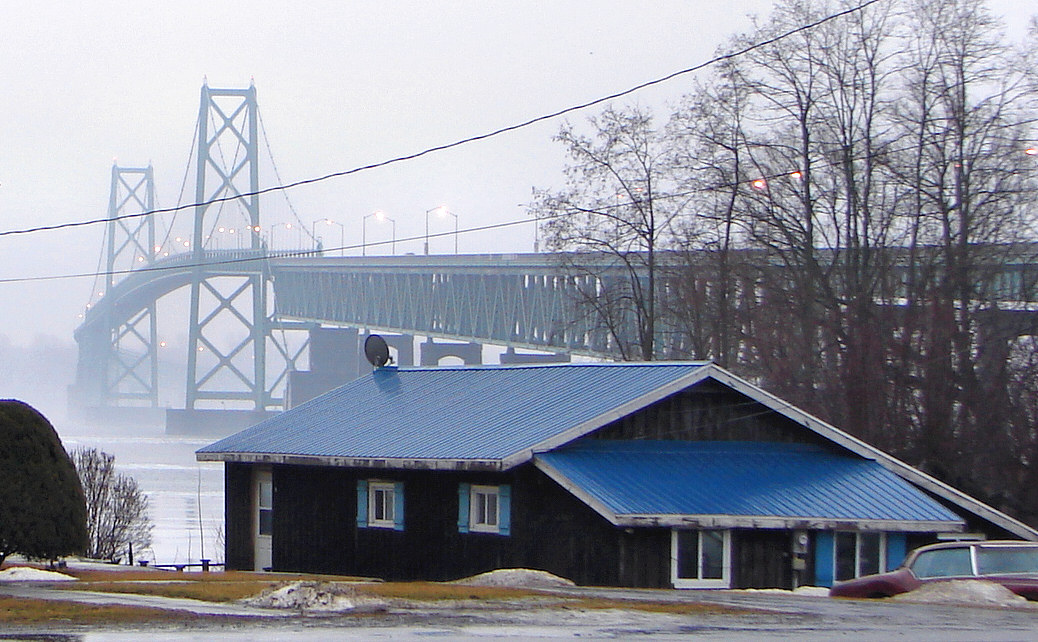
Johnstown with the Ogdensburg-Prescott International Bridge in the background.

- New York and Ogdensburg Railway, owned by the Bridge & Port Authority
- List of crossings of the Saint Lawrence River
- Port Authority of New York and New Jersey
- Toronto Harbour Commission, which purchased two car ferries in 1960 – Maple City (1951) and Windmill Point (1954) – that originally served Ogdensburg and Prescott
- List of bridges in Canada
- List of international bridges in North America
- List of Canada–United States border crossings

Other suspension bridges in Ontario:

- Sewells Road Suspension Bridge
- Ambassador Bridge
- Thousand Islands Bridge
- Buffalo and Fort Erie Public Bridge Authority
- Niagara Falls Bridge Commission
