= New York and Ogdensburg Railway =

Railway in New York

Overview
- Headquarters: Burlington, Vermont
- Reporting mark: NYOG
- Locale: Ogdensburg, New York

Technical
- Track gauge: 4 ft 8 1/2 in (1,435 mm) standard gauge

The Ogdensburg Bridge and Port Authority owns two segments of shortline railroad that are operated by Vermont Rail System dba the New York and Ogdensburg Railway (reporting mark NYOG) totaling approximately 26 mi (40 km). This railroad serves the Port of Ogdensburg and connects with CSX Transportation, thus providing intermodal service for industries of northern and central New York, as well as southeastern Ontario, Canada.
