= Lake Shore Boulevard Bailey Bridge =

Bridge in Toronto

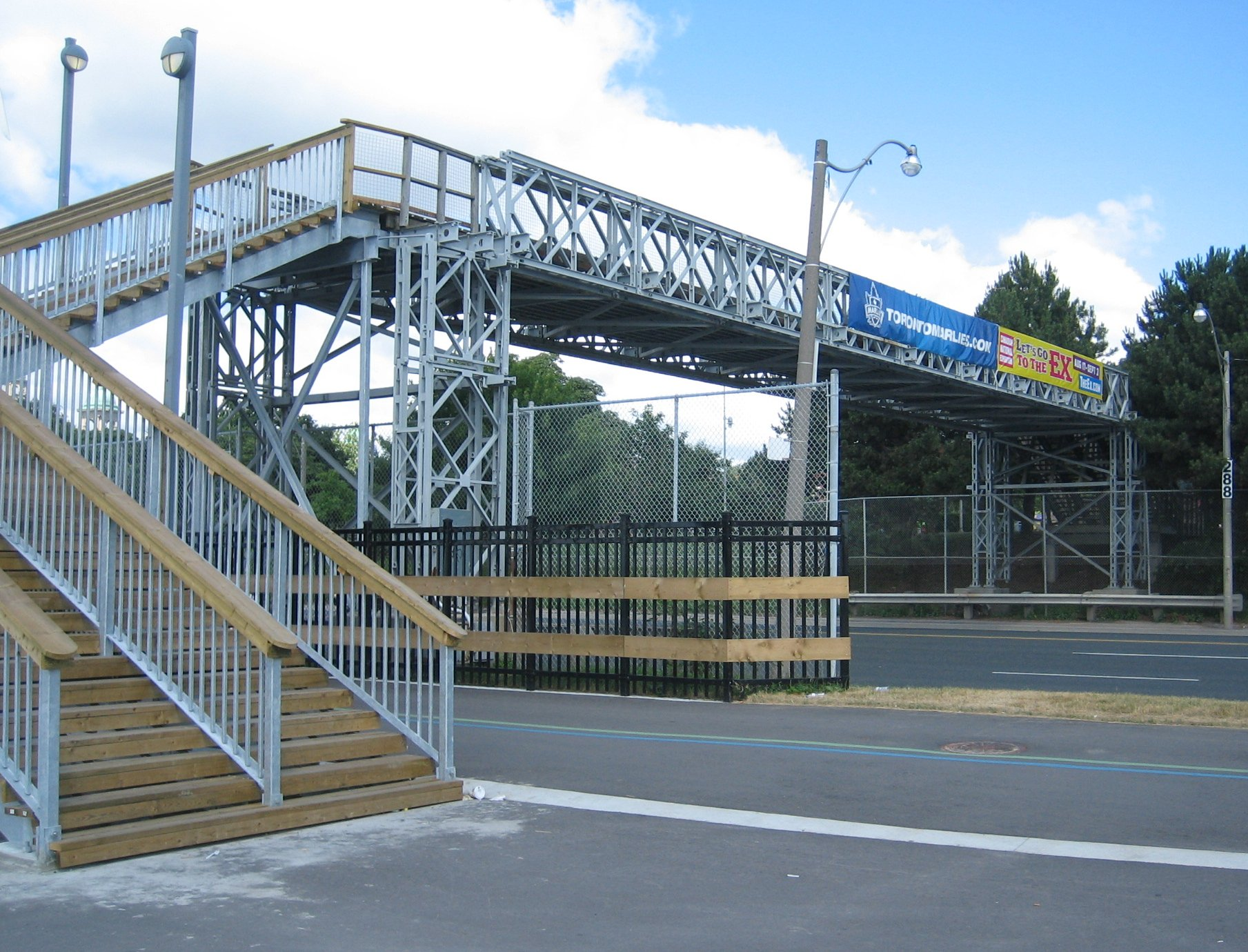
- Lake Shore Boulevard Bailey Bridge
- Coordinates: 43.6303619°N 79.4233082°W
- Carries: Pedestrians (not wheelchair accessible)
- Crosses: Lake Shore Boulevard
- Locale: Toronto
- Maintained by: Toronto Transportation Services

Characteristics
- Design: Bailey bridge
- Material: Steel
- Total length: 27.4 metres (90 ft)

History
- Constructed by: Hydro-Electric Power Commission of Ontario

Location
- Interactive map of Lake Shore Boulevard Bailey Bridge

Lake Shore Boulevard Bailey Bridge is a Bailey bridge in Toronto, Ontario. It is the one of two Bailey bridges in the current city and only remaining Bailey bridge within the Old Toronto. It was erected in 1952 (some say 1947) but dates back to World War II when it was manufactured for the British Army. It is used as a pedestrian bridge to connect Exhibition Place to the waterfront south of Lake Shore Boulevard.

This type of bridge was used to allow visitors to the Canadian National Exhibition to walk to waterfront activities in safety.

It was erected by the Hydro-Electric Power Commission of Ontario using steel supplied by the Dominion Bridge Company and was renovated during 1998.

== See also ==
- Old Finch Avenue Bailey Bridge
- Old (16th Avenue) Bailey Bridge
- Unwin Avenue Bridge
