= Dufferin Street bridges =

Dufferin Street Truss Bridge/Dufferin Street Overpass
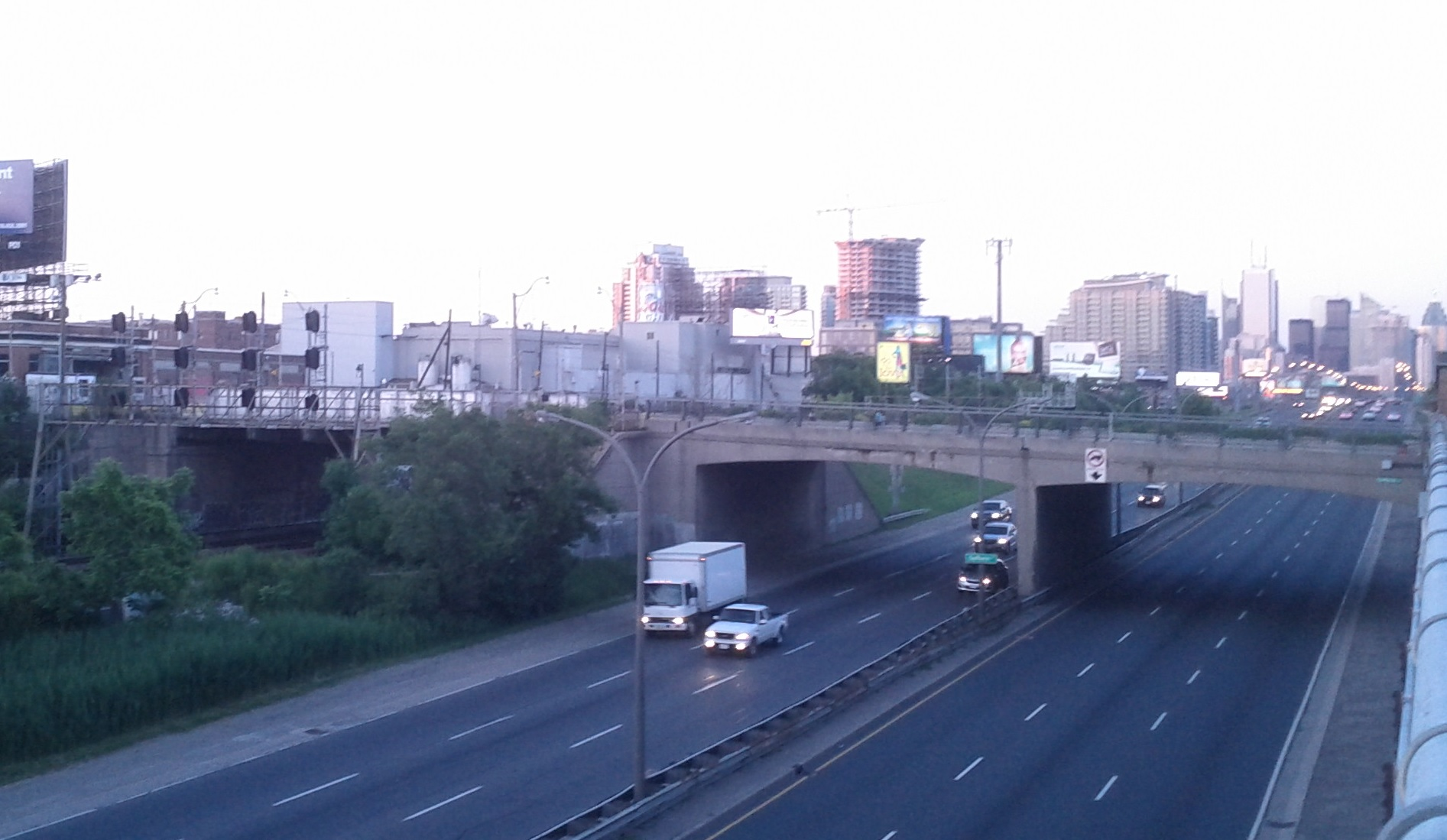
- The Dufferin Street bridges over the Gardiner Expressway and the rail line from the west.
- Coordinates: 43.634087°N 79.425402°W
- Carries: Pedestrians and Vehicular
- Crosses: Metrolinx/GO Transit rail corridor
- Locale: Toronto, Ontario, Canada
- Maintained by: Toronto Transportation Services

Characteristics
- Material: Steel and Concrete
- Total length: 30 metres (98 ft) (rail bridge); 35 metres (115 ft) (overpass)
- No. of spans: 2
- Clearance above: 6.37 metres (20.9 ft) (rail bridge)

History
- Construction start: 1911; 1958
- Construction end: 1912 (rail bridge); 1958 (overpass)
- Opened: 1912; 1959
- Closed: 2013

Location
- Interactive map of Dufferin Street Truss Bridge/Dufferin Street Overpass

The Dufferin Street bridges are two inter-connected vehicular bridges in Toronto, Ontario, Canada. The bridges carry Dufferin Street over a railway corridor and the Gardiner Expressway to Exhibition Place. The bridges closed to vehicular traffic in 2013. Temporary structures were built in 2013-2014 to allow a resumption of traffic in early 2014. As of July 2023, the spans over the Gardiner Expressway remain in place, as do the temporary bridges over the northern span.

== North span ==
The truss bridge is a 30 metres (98 ft) steel truss bridge, built from 1911 to 1912 to cross over railway tracks south of Springhurst Avenue. Four tracks pass under the bridge. A 2013 engineering study determined that the bridge was unsafe and not viable to be repaired. However, in 2014, Bailey bridges were added for pedestrian traffic on the east and west sides, while the inner steel plate box girder bridge for vehicular traffic remains in place.

== South span ==
The south span is a 35 metres (115 ft) concrete overpass built in 1958 after demolition of the old Dufferin Gate to allow for clearance for the Gardiner Expressway below.

== Deterioration and replacement ==
After a report from external inspections conducted in 2007, the city decided to replace both spans with a single span. The report found that:

- the 1911 steel plate girder bridge over rail corridor is structurally unsafe for vehicular traffic
- the bridges lack space below to expand the rail corridor
- the bridges need to provide space for future LRT corridor to the south end of the bridge
- the 1958 concrete bridge over Gardiner Expressway needs maintenance to keep it structurally safe
- the replacement should eliminate the existing 10 metres (33 ft) gap between the two existing bridges spans

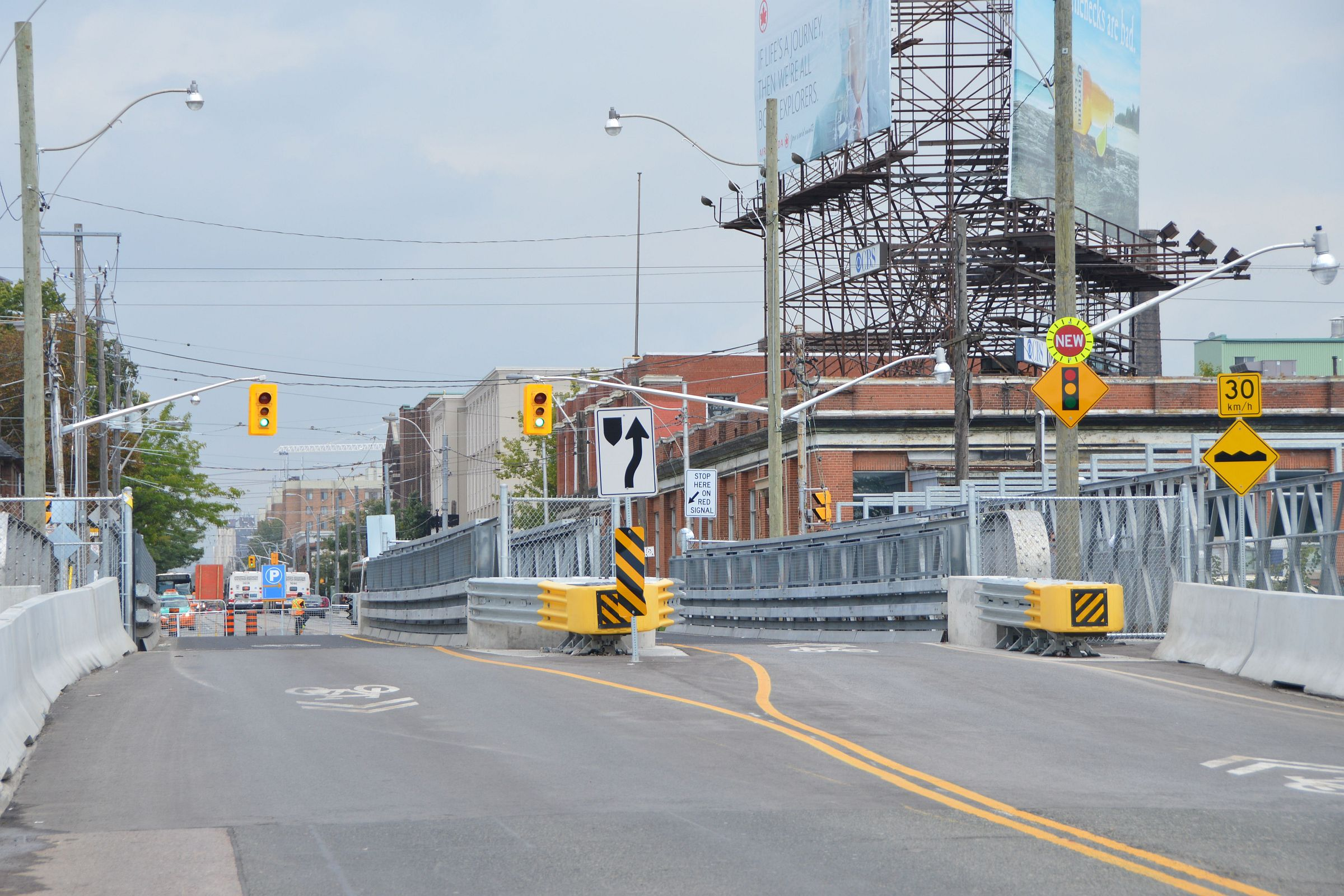
Temporary north bridges

From June 2013, the bridges have been closed to vehicular traffic. In November 2013-early 2014, the north bridge superstructure was replaced by three temporary bridges - two for traffic, and a third for pedestrians. The temporary bridges were opened in 2014 and are still used as of September 11, 2021.

Toronto tried deciding the type of bridge that will span over the tracks, but the decision was canceled as of September 11, 2021. The four types were:

- Steel plate box girder
- Hung arch
- Cable stay
- Concrete box girder

== Gallery ==
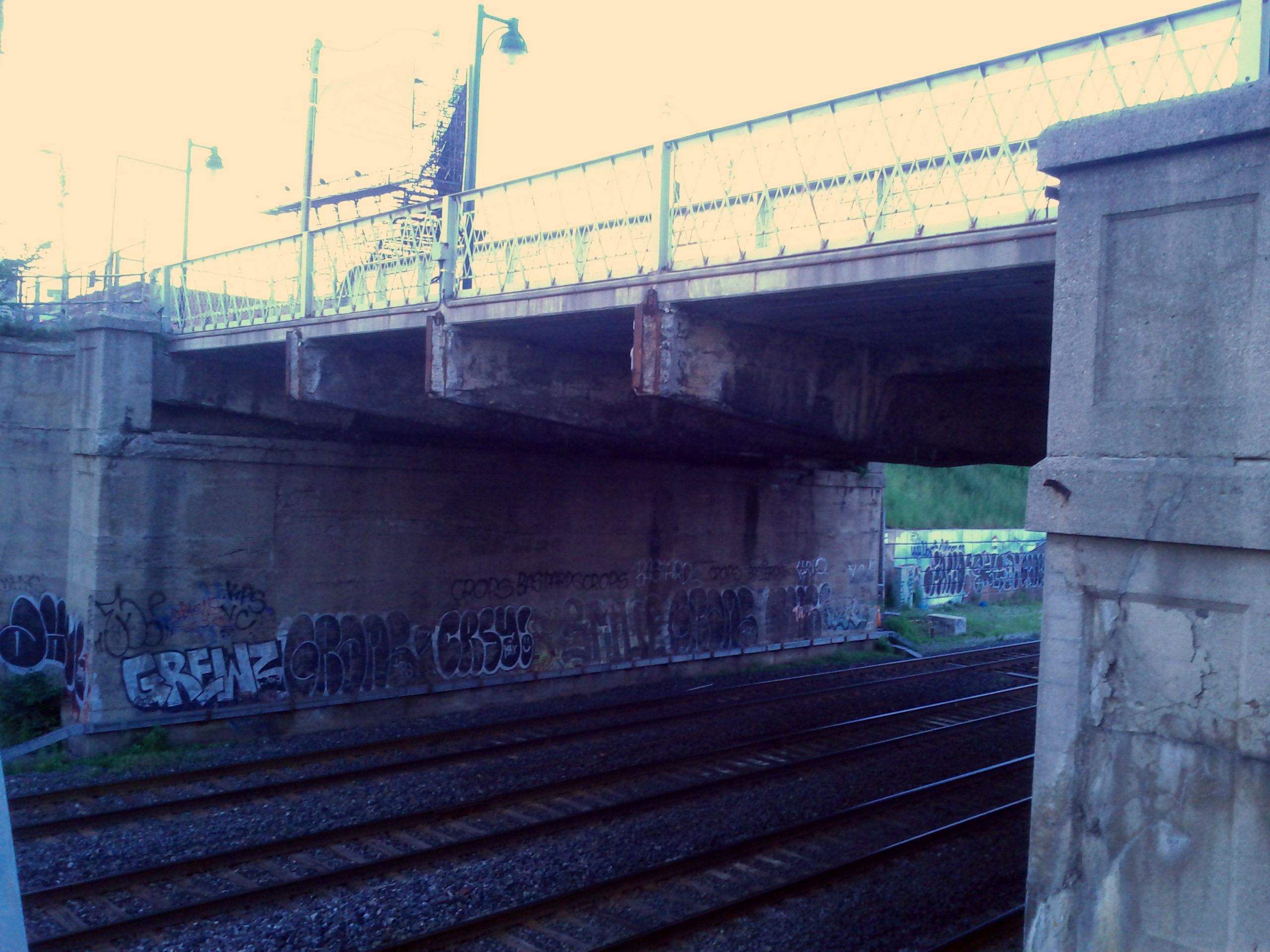
View of Dufferin Street bridge showing deterioration.

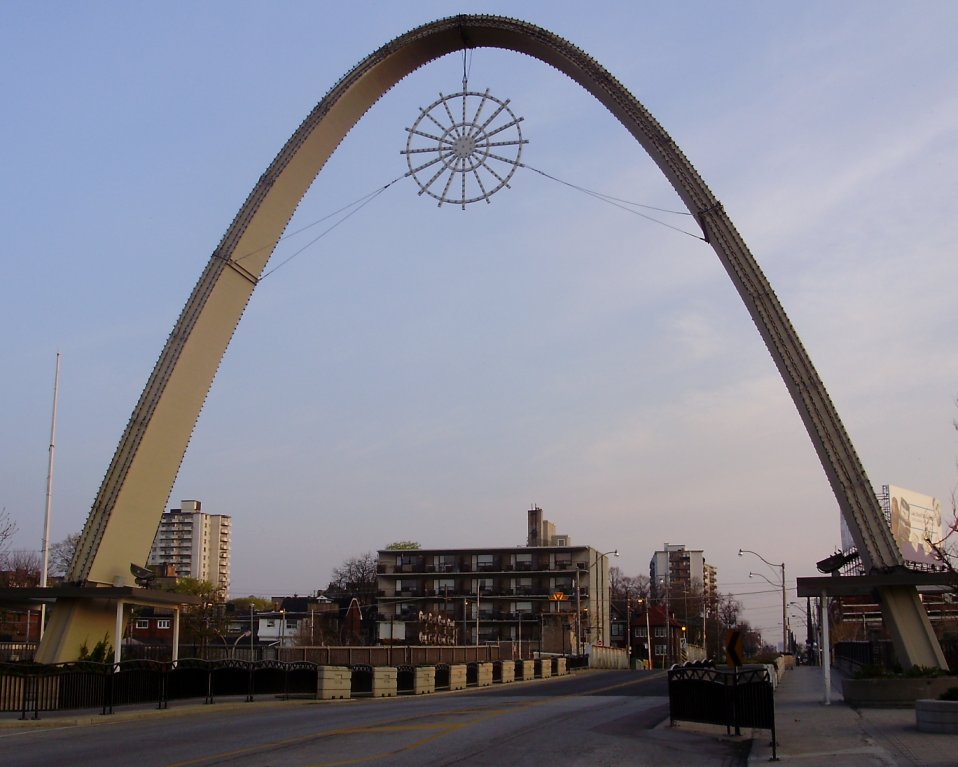
Looking north from Dufferin Gate with overpass in foreground and truss bridge in background
