= 16th Avenue Bailey Bridge =

- Coordinates: 43.90236°N 79.21408°W
- Carries: single lane of traffic on Sewells Road
- Crosses: Little Rouge Creek
- Locale: Markham, Ontario, Canada
- Maintained by: York Region Roads

Characteristics
- Design: Single-lane wood decked Bailey bridge
- Total length: 21.3 metres (70 ft)

History
- Opened: 1945
- Closed: 2014

Old (16th Avenue) Bailey Bridge is a Bailey bridge located below 16th Avenue (York Regional Road 73) east of Reesor Road within Rouge Park in Markham, Ontario, Canada. The bridge crossed the Little Rouge Creek, a tributary of the Rouge River. A new bridge was built above this bridge to provide two way access for 16th Avenue east of Ressor Road. The old bridge is in situ with ends fenced off to prevent trespassing.

== History ==
The 21.3-metre (70 ft) wood-plank-deck steel bridge was constructed in 1945. It was last restored in 1965. Little has changed for the traffic in the area, which is still rural and agricultural with land use protected as is within the boundaries of Rouge National Urban Park.

== Replacement ==
An assessment by York Region and Toronto and Region Conservation Authority in 2007 suggested the bridge be removed when the road was realigned and widened, though still noted that it "is of heritage interest", although it was, at the time, not listed in the Markham Heritage Inventory. In a 2010 report from the Transportation Services Committee to the Regional Council, Rouge Park management indicated their desire to maintain the Bailey bridge for pedestrian use. In mid-2011, the Toronto and Region Conservation Authority accepted the proposal to save the bridge for use in a future trail as part of Rouge National Urban Park by Parks Canada, after 16th Avenue was realigned and widened to eliminate the jog at Reesor Road.

By 2014, the realignment was complete and overpass built over the bridge. Roadway sections that formerly dipped downward to meet the old bridge are now gravel embankments for the new bridge. Old abutments remain in place as the old bridge is still in place. Mesh fencing closes off either end of the Bailey bridge to discourage trespassing.

The bridge was an early example of a Bailey bridge. They are now rare in Ontario.

== See also ==
Other bailey bridges in and around this one:

- Lake Shore Boulevard Bailey Bridge - pedestrian overpass
- Old Finch Avenue Bailey Bridge - vehicular bridge
- Jordan Bailey Bridge (21st Street), Jordan, Ontario
- Princess Point Bailey Bridge, Hamilton, Ontario
- Yonge Street Bailey Bridge - temporary bridge built to replace steel truss bridge washed out during Hurricane Hazel south of York Mills Road from 1954 to 1955
- Unwin Avenue Bridge, Toronto - vehicular traffic
- Forks of the Credit Provincial Park, Caledon Village

Other major bridges in Markham:

- Warden Avenue Berczy Creek North Bridge: built during widening of Warden between Highway 7 and 16th Avenue
- Warden Avenue Berczy Creek South Bridge: built during widening of Warden between Highway 7 and 16th Avenue
- Warden Avenue Carlton Creek Bridge: built during widening of Warden between Highway 7 and 16th Avenue
- Highway 7 East Beaver Creek Bridge: built during widening of Highway 7 for VivaNext busway
- Highway 7 Bullock Drive Bridge
- Highway 7 Roddick Road Bridge: built during widening of Highway 7 for VivaNext busway
- Highway 7 Brown's Corner Bridge (near Woodbine Avenue): built during widening of Highway 7 for VivaNext busway
- Birchmount Road Rouge River Bridge: built during extension of Birchmount from 14th Avenue to Highway 7
- Markham Road Rouge River Bridge: replacement and widening of road north of Highway 407 completed 2015
- Box Grove Bridge: over Rouge River completed 1991
