= Leaside Bridge =

Bridge in Toronto, Ontario, Canada

Leaside Bridge (Confederation Bridge)
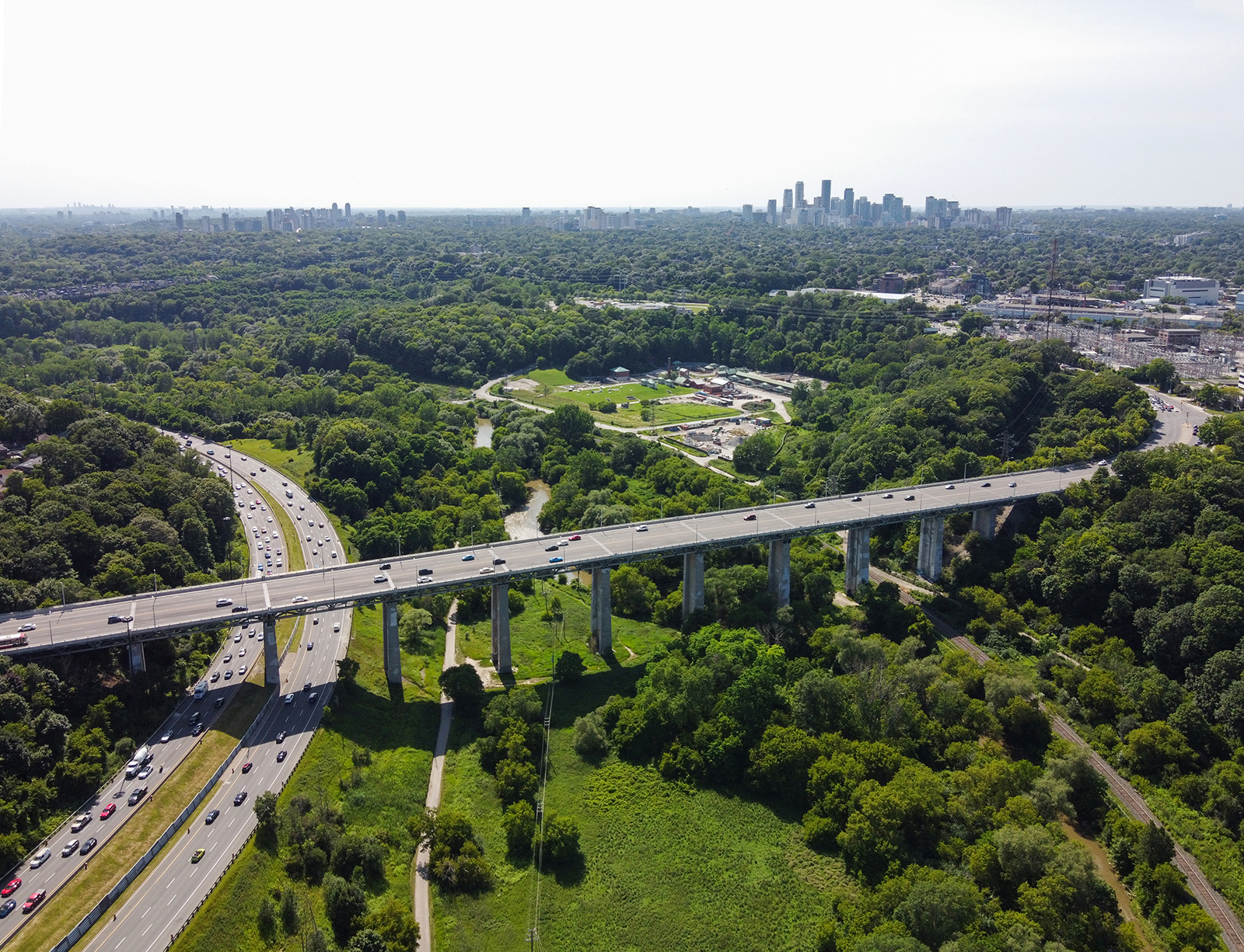
- The Leaside Bridge from the ravine
- Coordinates: 43°41′57″N 79°21′01″W
- Carries: 6 lanes of vehicular traffic, 2 bike lanes and sidewalks for pedestrian traffic
- Crosses: Don River
- Locale: Toronto, Ontario, Canada
- Other name: East York-Leaside Viaduct
- Maintained by: Toronto Transportation Services

Characteristics
- Design: Truss bridge
- Total length: 1,443 feet (440 m)
- Clearance below: Don River Valley and Don Valley Parkway

History
- Designer: Frank Barber
- Opened: October 29, 1927

Statistics
- Toll: No

Location
- Interactive map of Leaside Bridge (Confederation Bridge)

The Leaside Bridge, formerly the East York Leaside Viaduct, and officially commemorated as the Confederation Bridge, is a truss bridge that spans the Don River in the City of Toronto, Ontario. Carrying six lanes of Millwood Road, it was built to connect the then Town of Leaside, including Thorncliffe Park, to the then Township of East York, and was completed on October 29, 1927. The construction time of only 10 months was record breaking at the time.

== History ==
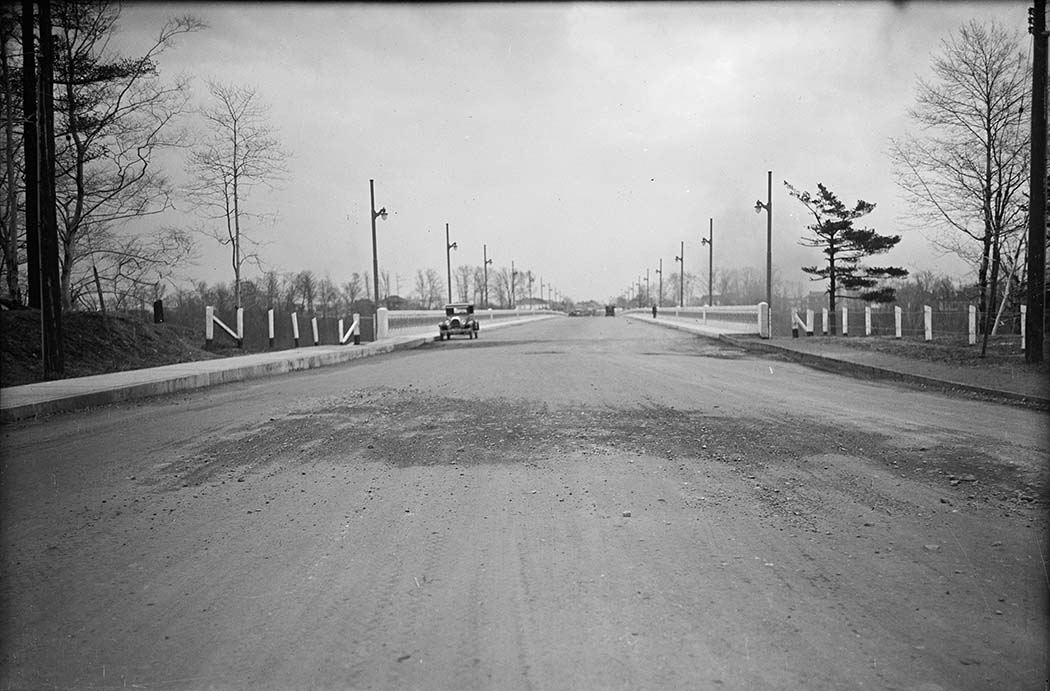
The Leaside Bridge in 1928

During the 1920s, as the new communities surrounding Toronto grew rapidly, several bridges were constructed to overcome the barrier of the Don Valley. Among these were the Vale of Avoca (St. Clair Avenue east of Yonge Street) and the East York – Leaside Viaduct. The town of Leaside, built by Canadian Northern Railway in the late teens and early 1920s, sought to attract investors and homebuyers. A connection over the Don Valley to the town of Todmorden Mills and on to Toronto would provide this.

Sod was turned in mid-December and active construction began in January 1927 under the direction of bridge designer Frank Barber. The bridge was rapidly assembled throughout the spring and summer, and inaugurated on October 29 as the Confederation Bridge, in honour of the sixtieth anniversary of that event. The tiled mosaic handrail was designed by New York architect Calude Bragdon with tiles supplied by Italian Mosaic and Tile Company.

In the late 1960s, as the first of numerous plans appeared to extend Leslie Street south of Eglinton, plans were initiated to widen the bridge to support six lanes of traffic. The bridge was closed beginning September 16, 1968, and reopened February 8, 1969. Girders were attached to the sides of the bridge to widen the deck to either side and the piers were reinforced on the corners to carry the additional weight. The expanded bridge had guardrail consisting of a concrete barrier topped with a double tubular railing, considerably plainer than the original decorative parapets.

Between 2004 and 2006, the bridge was rehabilitated. The second of two contracts to rehabilitate the bridge was awarded in 2005 and included the restoration of the decorative handrail from the original 1927 design.

== Safety Barrier Installation ==
The Leaside Bridge has been identified by the City of Toronto as a high-risk location for suicide. Concerns regarding suicide incidents at the bridge gained increased attention following the installation of the Luminous Veil, a suicide-prevention barrier on the nearby Bloor Street Viaduct, in 2003.

An article published by The Globe and Mail, titled "The new suicide bridge", documented a case in which an individual travelled to the Leaside Bridge after encountering the partially completed barrier at the Bloor Street Viaduct. The article reported that the individual had initially intended to go to the viaduct but changed plans after finding the barrier under construction, thus boarded a bus to the Leaside Bridge and ended his life there. It also documented concerns among emergency workers that suicide-related incidents were occurring at other locations, including bridges spanning the Don Valley.

The installation of the Luminous Veil prompted research into whether suicide-prevention barriers resulted in the displacement of suicides to other locations. A 2010 study published in the British Medical Journal found that although suicides at the Bloor Street Viaduct declined following the installation of the barrier, the rate of suicides from other bridges in Toronto increased during the first four years after its completion. Subsequent research examining the long-term effects of the Luminous Veil found that its installation was associated with a sustained reduction in suicides from bridges across Toronto, without evidence of long-term displacement to other locations.

On June 16, 2024, a fatal incident involving a person falling from the bridge onto a vehicle travelling on the Don Valley Parkway resulted in the deaths of both the individual who fell and a passenger in the vehicle. The incident renewed calls for protective barriers on the bridge. One year later, the family of the passenger killed by the incident filed a lawsuit against the City of Toronto, alleging that the municipality had failed to install protective barriers despite known safety concerns. The legal action brought renewed attention to the City's responsibility for public safety at the bridge.

In April 2025, Toronto City Council directed municipal staff to investigate options to accelerate the installation of protective barriers and consider interim safety measures. In October 2025, the City's Infrastructure and Environment Committee endorsed proceeding with a competitive procurement process for an interim curved safety fence. The committee also supported further consultation on interim measures and the installation of a permanent barrier as part of the bridge's next major state-of-good-repair project, then scheduled for 2037.

In June 2026, CityNews reported that construction of the interim safety barrier was expected to begin in July, with completion anticipated by December of that year. The temporary barrier was estimated to cost approximately $2.4 million, while the proposed permanent barrier was estimated to cost between $8 million and $9 million and was planned as part of the bridge's major rehabilitation project. However, by November 2026, construction had still not begun. During this period, on October 24, 2026, a 33-year-old man died after falling from the bridge onto the Don Valley Parkway below. The City attributed the construction delay to manufacturing and shipping issues, with fabrication of the custom barriers underway and installation expected to begin by March 2027.

== Facts ==
- Engineer: Frank Barber
- Associate architect: Claude Bragdon
- Height: 45.4 metres or 143.8 feet (12½ storeys)

== See also ==
- Prince Edward Viaduct
- Suicide bridge
- Sewells Road Bridge - another less significant bridge in Toronto designed by Frank Barber
- List of bridges in Canada
