= Old Finch Avenue Bailey Bridge =

Historic bridge in Toronto

- Old Finch Bailey Bridge
- Coordinates: 43°49′31″N 79°11′49″W
- Carries: single lane vehicular traffic
- Crosses: Rouge River
- Locale: Scarborough, Ontario, Canada
- Maintained by: Toronto Transportation Services

Characteristics
- Design: Bailey bridge
- Total length: 40 metres (130 ft)
- Clearance below: Rouge River

History
- Constructed by: 32 Combat Engineer Regiment, Canadian Army
- Opened: 1954

Location
- Interactive map of Old Finch Avenue Bailey Bridge

The Old Finch Avenue bridge is a Bailey bridge in Toronto. The Finch bridge is used for limited vehicular traffic on Old Finch Avenue in north-east Toronto to cross the Rouge River. The bridge dates back to late October 1954; it was constructed by the Canadian Army in three working days (including the timber piles supporting in mid-stream) using bridge components from the Ontario Hydro-Electric Power Commission, after Hurricane Hazel destroyed the old one. This bridge was built for single traffic; it is now controlled by traffic lights.

The bridge is considered an historic landmark in Toronto, where the City of Scarborough council has erected a plaque beside the bridge which reads:

BAILEY BRIDGE CONSTRUCTION 2ND FIELD ENGINEER REGIMENT
On October 15, 1954, Hurricane Hazel struck the Scarborough area with terrifying force, severely damaging or completely washing out several bridges. To maintain a safe flow of traffic throughout the Municipality, a number of Bailey Bridges were erected by the 2nd Field Engineer Regiment of the Canadian Military Engineers. This bridge is the last of those remaining in service in Scarborough. This plaque serves to commemorate the efforts of the 2nd Field Engineer Regiment in meeting this natural disaster.

There are two other Bailey bridges in the Greater Toronto Area:

- Lake Shore Boulevard Bailey Bridge in Toronto
- 16th Avenue Bailey Bridge in Markham (16th Avenue east of Reesor Road)

== See also ==
- Bailey bridge
- 2nd Field Engineer Regiment of the Canadian Military Engineers
- Hurricane Hazel
- 1989 Replacement of rusted Bailey components on the Finch Ave Bridge
