= Tamil protests =

Tamil protests can refer to several mass protests involving Tamils in India and Sri Lanka and/or the Tamil diaspora:

- Protests against the Sri Lankan civil war (2008-09)
  - Protests against the Sri Lankan Civil War in Canada (2008-09)
- 2013 Anti-Sri Lanka protests
- 2017 pro-Jallikattu protests
- 2017 Tamil Nadu farmers' protest
- Thoothukudi massacre (2018), occurred during the anti-Sterlite protests
- 2018 Tamil Nadu protests for Kaveri water sharing
