= Gardiner Expressway =

Controlled-access highway in Ontario

Gardiner Expressway
- Frederick G. Gardiner Expressway
- Gardiner Expressway highlighted in red
- Looking East towards downtown

Route information
- Maintained by Toronto Transportation Services
- Length: 18 km (11 mi)
- History: Proposed 1947 and originally named as Lakeshore Expressway until August 1957 when it took its current name.; Opened August 8, 1958 – April 1, 1997

Major junctions
- West end: Highway 427 / Queen Elizabeth Way
- East end: Don Valley Parkway

Location
- Country: Canada
- Province: Ontario
- Major cities: Toronto

Highway system
- Toronto municipal expressways
(by date opened)
← Highway 2A (1936)	Gardiner Expressway (1958)	Don Valley Parkway (1961) →
Ontario municipal expressways
(in alphabetical order)
← E. C. Row Expressway	Gardiner Expressway	Harbour Expressway →

The Frederick G. Gardiner Expressway, commonly known as the Gardiner Expressway or simply the Gardiner, is a partially at grade and elevated municipal expressway in Toronto, Ontario, Canada. Running close to the shore of Lake Ontario, it extends from the foot of the Don Valley Parkway (DVP) in the east, just past the mouth of the Don River, to the junction of Highway 427 and the Queen Elizabeth Way (QEW) in the west, for a total length of 18.0 kilometres (11.2 mi). East of Dufferin Street to just east of the Don River, the roadway is elevated for a length of 6.8 kilometres (4.2 mi), unofficially making it the longest bridge in Ontario.

The Gardiner is named after the first chair of the now-defunct Metro Council, Frederick G. Gardiner. The six-lane section east of the Humber River was built in segments from 1955 until 1964 by the Metropolitan Toronto government with provincial highway funds, and upon completion the Gardiner also received the Highway 2 provincial route numbering until 1998. The ten-lane section west of the Humber was formerly the eastern-most section of the QEW until it was transferred to Metro Toronto in 1997.

Often described as "an out-of-date, crumbling and frequently traffic-jammed freeway", the Gardiner is now the focus of a major rehabilitation project that is expected to last at least until 2030. The condition of the elevated section has deteriorated over the years, necessitating much of its replacement. Parts of the expressway have been demolished or re-designed. A section east of the Don River was demolished in 2001, while in 2018, the off-ramp to York/Bay/Yonge Streets was replaced by an off-ramp to Lower Simcoe Street, and the eastern terminus to Lake Shore Boulevard was demolished the following year.

In November 2023, the municipal and provincial governments announced a tentative deal that will see responsibility for the Gardiner Expressway and Don Valley Parkway transferred to the provincial government, with the two highways to be maintained as provincial highways.

== Route description ==
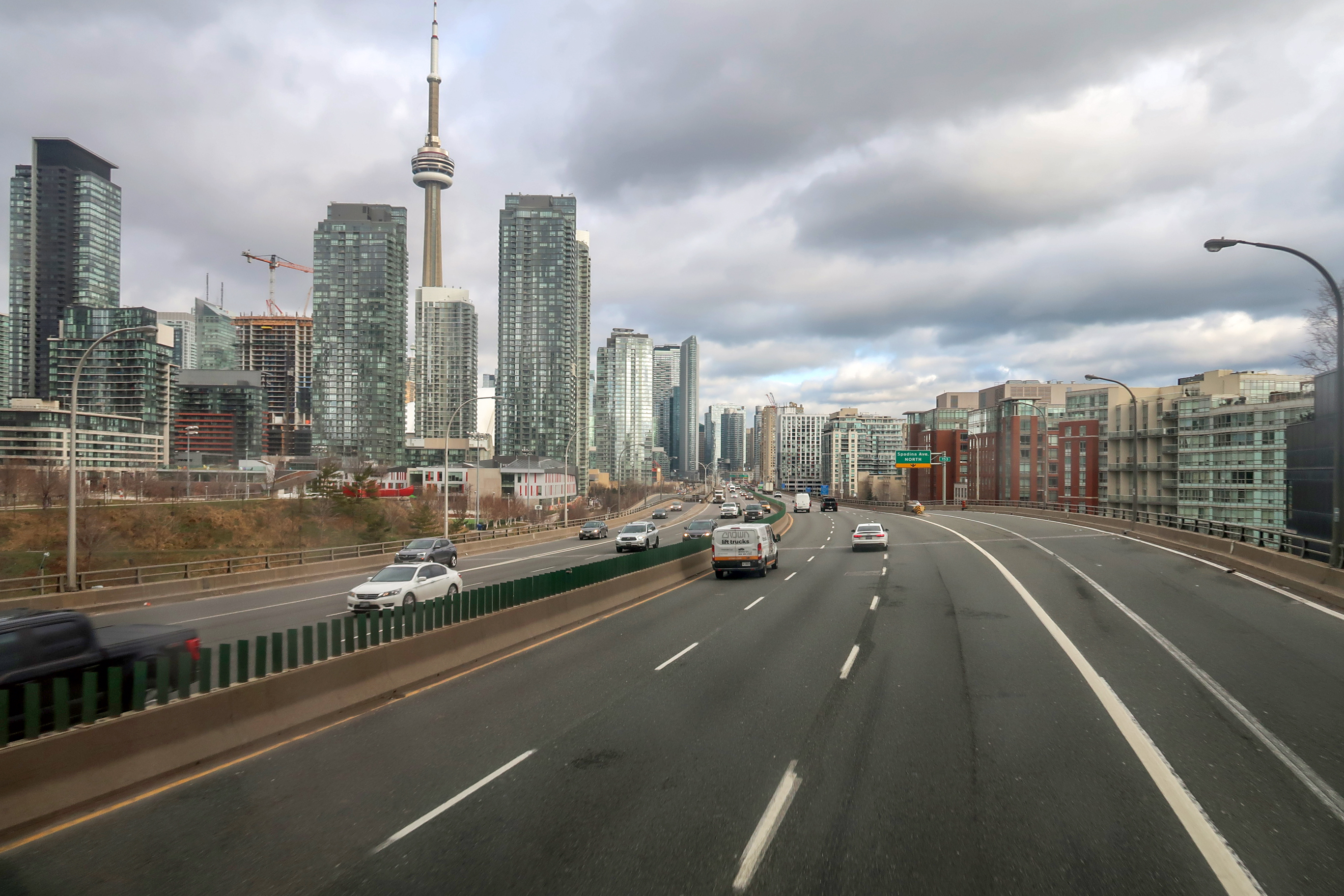
The elevated section of the Gardiner Expressway looking east as it crosses Spadina Avenue, in 2022

From the Queen Elizabeth Way (QEW) and Highway 427 interchange, east to the Humber River, the Gardiner is straight, eight-to-ten lanes wide. A continuation of the QEW, municipal control of the freeway starts shortly after an onramp from Highway 427. Due to its status as a former Ontario 400-series highway when it was previously the eastern segment of the QEW, and because of its more recent design (rebuilt in the late 1960s), this section was built to higher standards than the Metro-constructed Gardiner and has a speed limit of 100 km/h. A system of collector and express lanes serves the Parclo interchanges with Kipling Avenue and Islington Avenue, and as the eastbound collector lanes merge into the express lanes approaching the Royal York Road overpass this also marks the start of the lengthy off-ramp to Park Lawn Road. From Highway 427 to Grand Avenue the highway passes through an area of residential, commercial and light industry. To the south are the neighbourhoods of Alderwood and Mimico. After the 1997 provincial downloading to Metro (which became the "Megacity" of Toronto in 1998), much of this former QEW has remained largely unchanged though some segments have received a mix of high mast and low masts with shaded high pressure sodium lamps (similar to the Don Valley Parkway), while the old steel guardrail in the median was replaced by an Ontario "tall-wall" concrete barrier in 2007. Worn-out bilingual provincial signage has received unilingual replacements, while billboards which the province had long prohibited have been erected in proximity of the now-municipal freeway.

East of Grand Avenue, the freeway crosses Park Lawn Road and a CN rail line, then it curves as it passes the residential condominium towers of The Queensway – Humber Bay neighbourhood along the waterfront, the Mr. Christie cookie factory (which later became a part of Mondelēz International) and the Ontario Food Terminal on the north side. Two eastbound lanes exit to Lake Shore Boulevard as the eastbound carriageway narrows to three lanes, followed shortly by an onramp from Lake Shore Boulevard (which was also the point where the Gardiner previously assumed the provincial Highway 2 concurrency from Lake Shore Boulevard, until 1998 when the province downloaded most of Highway 2 which left both Lake Shore Boulevard and the Gardiner without a provincial route number). The westbound carriageway widens to four lanes thanks to the onramp from Lake Shore Boulevard becoming a continuous lane. As the route meets the west bank of the Humber River this marks the QEW's old eastern terminus and the beginning of the Metro Toronto-built segment. This old demarcation line was quite visible on the highway as a change in pavement quality and the use of different guardrail and lighting (since the late 1960s the province used truss poles originally fitted with mercury halide lamps before being replaced by high-pressure sodium in the 1990s, while Metro installed distinctive cobra-neck 30-foot (9.1 m) poles with fluorescent tubes that were since swapped for orange low-pressure sodium lamps in 1978).

East of Brookers Lane, the route geometry of Lake Shore becomes complicated due to the interchange with the parallel Gardiner Expressway; as the two routes run right next to each other to the north near the Humber River crossing: The westbound lanes cross the Gardiner (running along the north side of it) and are intertwined with the ramp from the westbound expressway which meets the street opposite Brookers Lane after crossing back to the south side; although Lake Shore still has an overlapping two-way section east of this point entirely south of the Gardiner. The Lake Shore streetcar line runs along this segment for a short distance before leaving the street to enter Humber Loop via a short tunnel under the Gardiner. Lake Shore then briefly downgrades to a two-lane local street and then becomes one lane (and one way) eastbound as it merges with the eastbound offramp from the Gardiner (which provides the large majority of the traffic along Lake Shore east of this point). on the Humber River bridge.

East of the Humber River bridges the speed limit lowers to 90 km/h as the Gardiner curves along Humber Bay, passing to the south of the Swansea neighbourhood, before passing the Sunnyside waterfront on the south and High Park and the Roncesvalles neighbourhood on the north side. Along the north side from Roncesvalles to Exhibition Place is the neighbourhood of Parkdale. Like the rail lines which run parallel to the Gardiner along its north side, the Gardiner is built in a cut from Dowling Avenue to Dufferin Street and is below grade. From Dufferin to Strachan Avenue, the highway is flanked by light industry and a wall of residential towers in the Liberty Village neighbourhood to the north and the buildings of Exhibition Place on the south side. The highway becomes elevated at this point, rising at a gentle grade with a view of the Toronto skyline straight ahead.

From east of the Exhibition Place streetcar loop and just west of Strachan Avenue, the space below the elevated sections of the highway was enclosed for use as storage space. Bricked sections with windows can be seen when driving along Manitoba Drive or taking the streetcar in or out of Exhibition Place. GO Transit's Exhibition train station is located under the Gardiner Expressway with tracks located on the north side of the Gardiner.

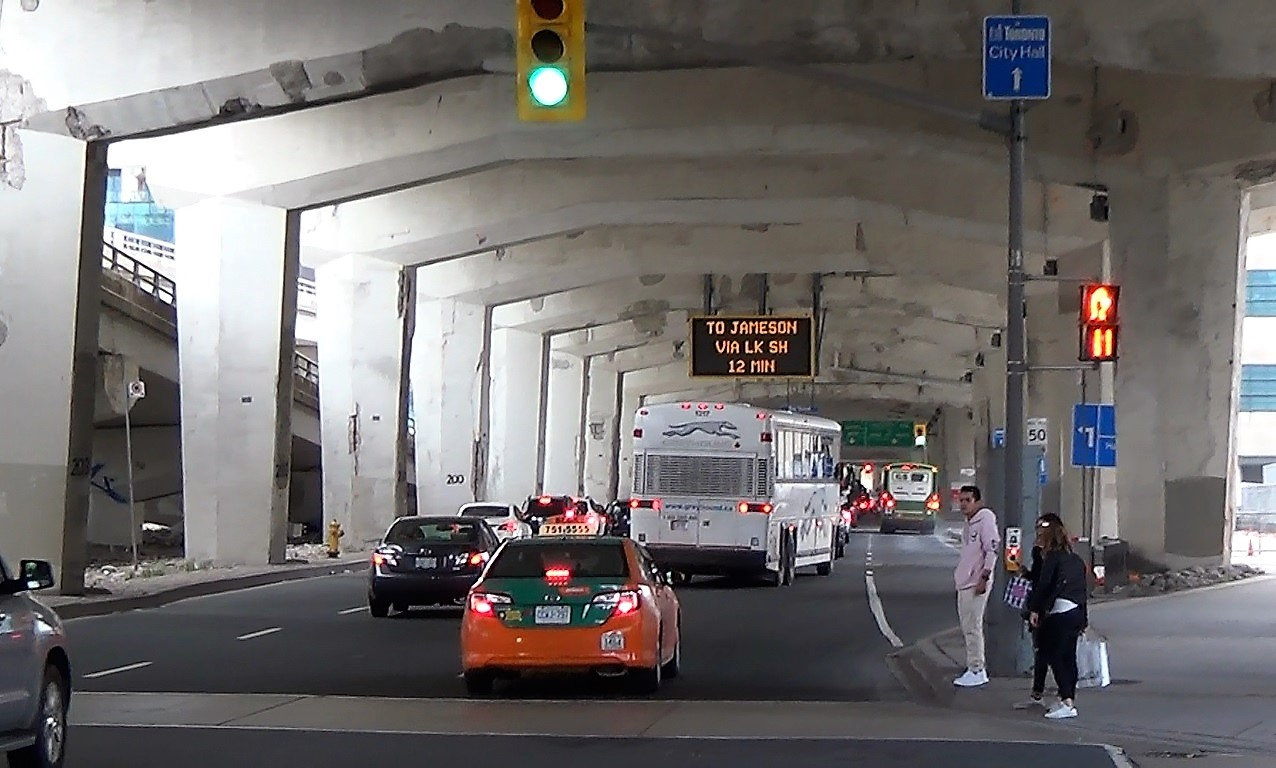
The underside of the Gardiner's elevated section, with Lake Shore Boulevard running through it

To the east of Strachan Avenue, the highway is entirely elevated mostly overhead of Lake Shore Boulevard. Just east of Strachan, the highway passes historic Fort York on the north side and Coronation Park to the south. From Bathurst Street eastward to Spadina Avenue, it passes through CityPlace and immediately after passes south of the CN Tower and the Rogers Centre and north of the residential condominiums of the western end of the Harbourfront neighbourhood. Between York and Yonge Streets, the highway is flanked by the downtown skyscrapers of the South Core and eastern Harbourfront area, and passes the Scotiabank Arena. North along Bay Street are the office towers of the Toronto Financial District. From Yonge east to the Don Valley Parkway, the rail lines run parallel to the Gardiner on the north side, and to the north of the rail lines is the low-rise residential development of the St. Lawrence neighbourhood, the Distillery District and the West Don Lands. To the south of the highway, the land use is light industrial and waterfront lands in transition. The highway crosses the Don River where there are connecting ramps to the Don Valley Parkway. From 2002 to September 2021, the highway's elevated section descends to ground level via the Logan Avenue Ramp where it merges with Lake Shore Boulevard before a signalized intersection with Bouchette Street. Due to the ongoing realigment of the highway's eastern end as of September 2021, with the demolition of the Don River crossing and Logan Avenue Ramp, traffic defaults to the Don Valley Parkway ramp.

The elevated section is supported by steel-reinforced concrete columns. The roadway itself was constructed on top of concrete slabs supported by steel girders. The height of the elevated section is higher than required to cross city streets and provide clearance underneath. The intent of this was to reduce traffic noise at ground level. The highest point of the elevated section is the eastbound ramp from the Gardiner to the Don Valley Parkway which goes up and over the westbound lanes, then drops to ground level. A tall wall concrete barrier topped with green metal blades is installed in the median of the elevated segment. The blades act to reduce the glare of oncoming headlights from the opposing direction of traffic. During the original construction concrete parapet walls with metal railings were used in the outer sections as well as a divider between westbound and eastbound traffic. At grade sections west of Bathurst Street use steel guard rails, but originally featured a narrow grass median.

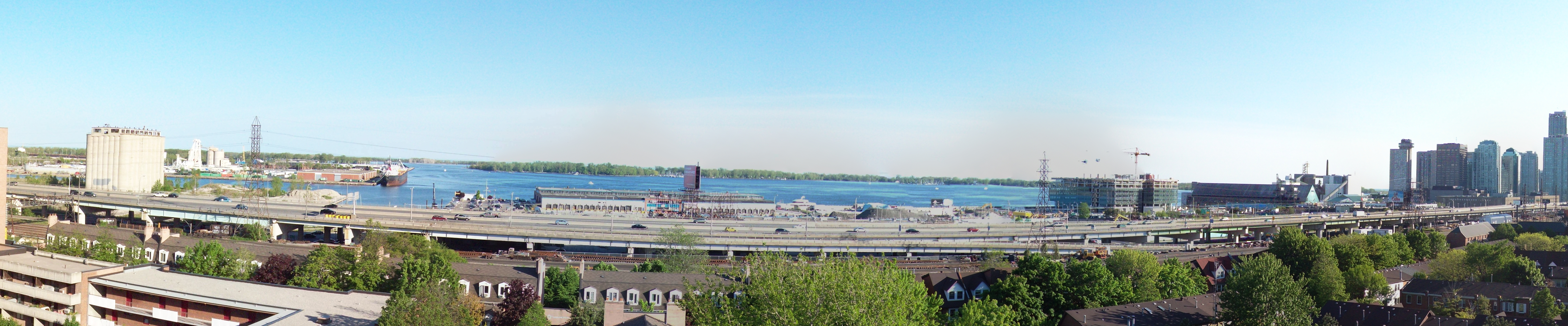
The Gardiner east of Yonge Street

=== The Bentway ===
A public trail and activity space was built underneath the Gardiner, between Strachan and Spadina Avenue. Named after the Gardiner's main supports (bents), The Bentway uses bents to create 55 separate areas for a variety of activities. The first phase of the project was completed on January 6, 2018.

=== Lighting ===
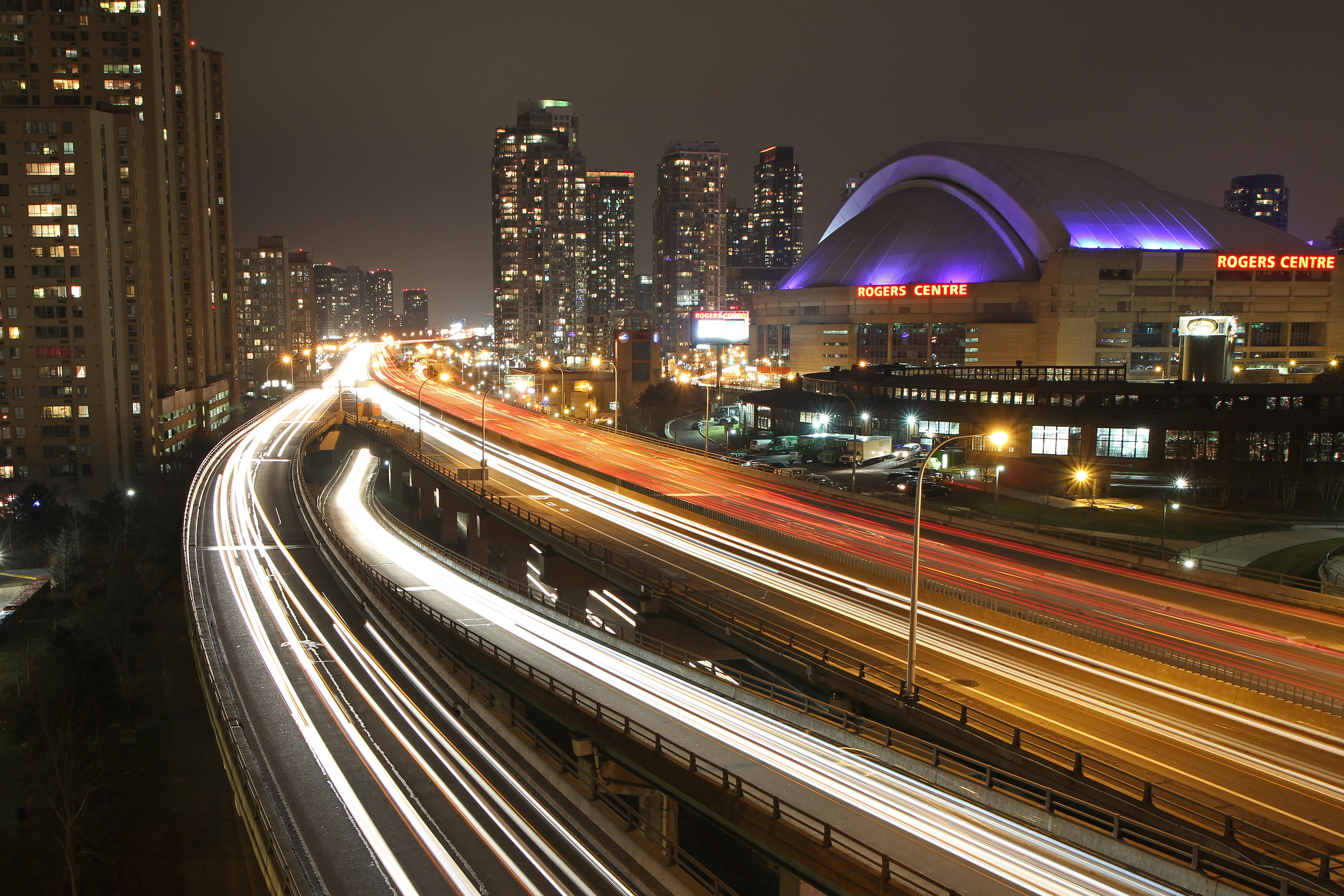
Gardiner Expressway at night near Rogers Centre, looking west. Note the eastbound off-ramp to York/Bay/Yonge Streets on the left, which was removed in April 2017.

The Gardiner, along with the Don Valley Parkway and Allen Road, were fitted with distinct cobra-neck 30-foot (9.1 m) lamp poles. They were first fitted with fluorescent tubes in the 1960s, which was changed to the orange low-pressure sodium-vapor lamps (LPS) in 1978. (A 1960s experiment of installing lights on the elevated Gardiner's parapets was quickly shelved.) In the late 1990s, the low pressure sodium lighting was failing and most of the cobra-neck conventional poles were replaced in favour of shaded high-mast lighting, with high-pressure sodium-vapor lamps (HPS); however the elevated Gardiner still retained the LPS cobra-neck poles for seven more years, while the section immediately west of Dufferin Street still contains several with HPS lamps. The last remaining LPS lamps, which were no longer being produced, were all replaced by HPS in early 2006.

Since the end of 2003, the conventional truss lighting poles that the province installed on the QEW segment in the late 1960s have been removed west of Kipling Avenue and east of Royal York Road, being replaced with shaded high-mast lighting like that used on the Don Valley Parkway. The HPS lamps on the elevated section are currently being replaced with LED lighting on the existing cobra-neck poles.

=== Safety ===
On August 11, 1958, three days after the road opened, the Gardiner Expressway's first collision happened.

The expressway has 28 cameras that are part of the Road Emergency Services Communications Unit system (found also on the Don Valley Parkway and Allen Road). Locations with two cameras have one on the elevated portion and one on the underside along Lake Shore Boulevard. Some cameras are off the Gardiner on Lake Shore Boulevard.

Multi piece vertical blade delineators have been installed upon portions of the concrete median barriers separating the east and westbound lanes.

== History ==
=== Planning ===
1947 plan

The Gardiner Expressway was one of the first projects undertaken by the newly formed government of Metro Toronto. The route of the Expressway necessitated the paving over of parkland, demolition of residences and a popular amusement park, and a long elevated section to get through the downtown area. Planning was done stage-by-stage, from the Humber River east through downtown. The Humber Bay section was built according to initial plans. The route in the Exhibition Place area changed over time from one along the lake shore into downtown, to one aligned along the railway north of Exhibition Place. The initial route east of Exhibition Place would have necessitated the moving or removal of Old Fort York, but was moved to a more southerly alignment after protest. The elevated section through downtown was then aligned over the existing Lake Shore Boulevard in the area. East of downtown, the initial plans were for a ground-level route east to Woodbine, but this was changed in conjunction with the planning of the interchange of the Don Valley Parkway into downtown from the north to an elevated section east to Leslie Street. Various routes to the east were proposed, but never progressed beyond planning studies due to public protest.

Plans for the highway, first named the Lakeshore Expressway, were first developed prior to the formation of Metro Toronto. In the post-war period, the population of greater Toronto was growing at a rate of 50,000 persons per year, the ownership of private automobiles was growing, and the traffic between downtown Toronto and the western suburbs was regularly stuck in 'traffic jams.' (The Sunnyside stretch of the Lake Shore Boulevard and Queen and King Streets in the Parkdale and High Park areas were apparently notorious for this.) Another reason for the proposal to build the lake shore highway was the expected opening of the Saint Lawrence Seaway and the need for adequate roadways to serve the expanded port facilities.

In May 1947, the Toronto City Planning Board proposed building a four-lane "Waterfront Highway" from the Humber to the Don River. In November 1947, the City's works committee approved a four-lane highway, following a path beside the rail lines along the north of the Canadian National Exhibition (CNE) grounds, ending at Fleet Street to the East at a cost of CA$6 million, to be approved by a plebiscite. The Toronto Board of Control approved the plan, but City Council voted against the plan after 11 hours of deliberation, sending it back to the Board of Control. In December 1947, the Board of Control abandoned the plan, on advice that the bridges for the highway would not be built due to a shortage of steel.

By 1952, the lake shore highway plan cost had escalated to an estimated $30 million. Toronto's Mayor Allan A. Lamport objected to the cost being borne solely by the City of Toronto. Lamport suggested that the road could be built either as a toll road or built by private interests. A toll road was opposed by the Ontario Deputy Minister of Highways J. D. Millar, who suggested that "cars would be waiting for miles" to pay a three-cent tax. Millar stated that "the Ontario driver was taxed and taxed heavily and expected his roads will be paid for." Toronto at the time was not yet planning to fully build the highway, only planning to build a new Humber bridge to connect the Queen Elizabeth Way and expand roads in the Sunnyside area, of which the city would pay CA$4.2 million and the province $4.7 million. At the same time Ontario was planning its Toronto Bypass north of the city and George Doucett, the Ontario minister of highways, pronounced the toll highway an "antiquated concept" and predicted that no-one would use it if it was tolled and instead would use the bypass instead. H. M. Bishop of the Ontario Motor League also criticized the toll highway saying if it was tolled it would "hardly see a car all day long. The net result would be to increase, not decrease, congestion on city streets." Toronto Board of Control abandoned the project in July 1952, stating that it would need additional funds not forthcoming from the Ontario government.

In July 1953, prior to the formation of Metro Toronto, the Metropolitan Executive Committee, chaired by Fred Gardiner, ordered the planning of the Lakeshore Expressway as a four-lane or six-lane expressway from the Humber in the west to Woodbine Avenue in the east. The cost was estimated at CA$20 million. Route planning was given to the engineering firm Margison Babcock and Associates, with the proviso that an American firm expert in expressway building would be involved. Margison's plan was delivered in April 1954. The roadway was to be constructed in the Sunnyside area and CNE grounds to the south of the present Lake Shore Boulevard. South of the CNE grounds, the route would be on lands created from infilling of the shoreline to the breakwaters and an interchange was proposed in front of the Prince's Gate. East of the CNE grounds, the highway would be an elevated roadway above the existing Fleet Street, to just west of the Don River. The highway proceeded at grade from that point eastward, ending at Coxwell Avenue and Queen Street East. Interchanges were proposed for Jameson Avenue, Strachan Avenue, Spadina Avenue, York Street, Jarvis Street, Don Roadway, Carlaw Avenue, Keating Avenue (the present Lake Shore Boulevard East) and Coxwell Avenue. The cost was then estimated at $50 million. The plan also proposed extending Queen Street westwards through High Park to west of the Humber River to connect with the Queensway and extending Keating Avenue east to Woodbine Avenue.

Neighbourhoods
	Exit
Islington-City Centre West	Brown's Line
Alderwood	Kipling Avenue
Mimico	Islington
The Queensway-Humber Bay	Park Lawn Road
Swansea	Lake Shore Boulevard
Roncesvalles	Jameson Avenue
Parkdale	Jameson Avenue
Liberty Village	north of Exhibition Place
Niagara	north of Exhibition Place
CityPlace	Spadina Avenue
Harbourfront	Spadina Avenue
St. Lawrence	Yonge/York
Distillery District	Jarvis Street
West Don Lands	Jarvis Street
A list of neighbourhoods along the Gardiner from west to east.

The shoreline route was opposed by the City of Toronto and the Toronto Harbour Commission, and Margison was tasked with plotting a route north of the CNE grounds. This plan was delivered in July 1954. The change to an inland route north of the CNE grounds was estimated to cost another $11 million as the homes to the west of the CNE grounds would have to be purchased and demolished. This change moved the route from the Humber to the Ontario Hydro right-of-way next to the railway tracks, saving 11 acres (45,000 m^{2}) of waterfront. The expressway was moved to the north of Lake Shore Boulevard in the Sunnyside segment and the Jameson Avenue area.

The inland route, while not opposed in the Sunnyside and Jameson areas, faced opposition in its proposed route in the CNE to downtown segment. Alternative route proposals emerged in 1954 from the Toronto Harbour Commission, which wanted the route moved further north, and planner Edwin Kay, who proposed a tunnel through downtown. The decision was then made to proceed with the non-contentious parts of the original Margison plan, to build a new Humber bridge to connect with the QEW, the Queen Street extension, and the Humber River to Dowling section, demolishing Sunnyside Park and South Parkdale. Metro also approved the eastern section of the expressway from Sherbourne Street to the east, but the central, elevated section was left for further deliberation. Metro approved $33 million for the eastern and western sections in its 1955 budget, but omitted the Humber River bridge.

The route to the north of the CNE grounds followed a Hydro-electric right-of-way beside the railway tracks to the north of the Exhibition, using approximately 10 acres (40,000 m^{2}) of CNE land, and requiring the removal of the original Dufferin Gate and the demolition of two other CNE buildings. To make up for the loss of lands, Metro infilled into Lake Ontario to the breakwater.

East of the CNE grounds, the inland route proposed to fly over Fort York with a westbound on-ramp from Bathurst Street directly over the fort. Opposition from historical societies and the City of Toronto came to a head when the city refused to transfer the land to Metro Toronto. Gardiner himself and George O. Grant, the Metro Roads Commissioner, at first opposed the re-routing of the highway around the fort as it would mean a "greater than six-degree curve" in the highway, necessitating drivers to slow down. Gardiner rescinded his opposition to the change in March 1958 after visiting the site with a delegation from the City and historical societies. In 1959, Fort York was again under threat. A proposal was published to link Highway 400 to the Gardiner to meet in the vicinity of the fort. Gardiner proposed that Metro Toronto and the City share the costs of relocating the fort to the waterfront. In the end, the fort was not moved, the westbound on-ramp from Bathurst Street was cancelled, no interchange was built in the area and the Highway 400 extension was never approved.

=== Construction ===
The Gardiner Expressway from the Dufferin Street bridge, looking west toward the Jameson Avenue/Dunn Avenue exit

Construction on the expressway began in 1955 with the building of The Queensway and the Keating Avenue (now Lake Shore Boulevard East) extension to the foot of Woodbine Avenue. The Gardiner was built in segments, with the final section being completed in 1966. The cost was approximately CA$110 million ($1.03 billion in 2025 dollars). Construction of the first part of the actual Expressway started in 1956 with the Humber River bridge, followed by the Humber to Jameson segment. Max Tanenbaum's York Steel supplied the iron girder sections that supported the road deck on the elevated sections.

Humber River to Jameson Avenue

The route of the expressway around Humber Bay necessitated the demolition of the Sunnyside Amusement Park on the lakeshore, which had existed since 1925. Some amusements were moved to the CNE, others sold off or just destroyed. The carousel was moved to the newly built Disneyland. The Amusement Park lands were subsumed by the Lake Shore Boulevard expansion to six lanes. Only the Palais Royale hall, Sunnyside Bathing Pavilion and Sunnyside Pool were not demolished. A pedestrian bridge crossing was built from the foot of Roncesvalles Avenue to the Palais Royale site.

To the east of Sunnyside, the 1800s-era 'South Parkdale' residential neighbourhood at the foot of Jameson Avenue was demolished in 1957. The expressway, like the railway just to the north, was cut through the area at lake shore level. An interchange was built at Jameson with on and off ramps to Lake Shore Boulevard, and Lake Shore Boulevard was expanded to six lanes in the area. This created a pedestrian barrier to the lake shore for Parkdale neighbourhood residents to the north. Efforts made by community groups over the next 20 years to restore access to the lake shore, including plans to cover the section of the Expressway and railway line, did not come to fruition. A pedestrian bridge over Lake Shore Boulevard at the foot of Jameson Avenue was eventually built. Jameson Avenue, which had previously been a street of mansions, saw intense apartment building development after the building of the Expressway.

The section between Humber River and Jameson Avenue was completed in 1958. The expressway, by then named the Gardiner Expressway, was officially opened by Gardiner himself and Ontario Premier Leslie Frost on August 8, 1958. When this section opened, it opened without guard-rails on the median dividing the different directions. Steel guard-rails and a 'glare shield' were approved for this section in 1965 at a cost of CA$200,000. The road bridge of Dowling Avenue over the Gardiner was demolished in the 2000s, replaced by a pedestrian bridge.

The Gardiner under construction in the summer of 1962, passing over Spadina Avenue

Jameson Avenue to York Street

The section between Jameson Avenue and Spadina Avenue was completed and opened on August 1, 1962 and the westbound lanes from York Street were opened on December 3, 1962. The eastbound lanes from Spadina to York opened in 1963. The elevated section starts from the north-east corner of the CNE. The route to the east of the CNE was modified to avoid passing over historic Old Fort York. The Gardiner passes over some of the fort's property, and it is extra high to allow for possible multiple interchanges.

East of Fort York, the Gardiner was built entirely as an elevated route, through a predominantly industrial area, to the south of railway lands to reach downtown. The roadway was built directly overhead of Fleet Street (Fleet is now Lake Shore Boulevard West east of Bathurst but Fleet exists as parallel roadway on the north side from Bathurst to Strachan Avenue) through much of this section. The expressway off-ramp to York/Bay/Yonge Streets was developed as a two-lane eastbound 'finger' flying over Harbour Street, south of the main roadway, descending to Harbour Street with a circular off-ramp to York Street northbound, and it was nicknamed the "Hot Wheels Ramp".

York Street to the Don Valley Parkway

This segment was completed in 1964. In the original proposal, the elevated segment would descend to ground level and meet the Don Valley Parkway at a clover-leaf interchange. It was instead constructed as an elevated section overhead of Lake Shore Boulevard and at its eastern end forks into a flyover of the Don River mouth and a separate connector to the east. The section between the Parkway and Yonge Street was built eight lanes wide.

Don Valley Parkway to Leslie Street

Known as "Gardiner East", this segment was elevated directly overhead of Lake Shore Boulevard, and opened in July 1966 without ceremony. This section had no access to the Don Valley Parkway, as westbound motorists had to continue underneath on Lake Shore Boulevard which met the Parkway on-ramp at a signalized intersection. Gardiner East ended just east of Leslie Street where eastbound traffic was forced to exit at an offramp descending to Lake Shore Boulevard (renamed from Keating Street) or a circular ramp to Leslie Street, while for westbound traffic entering the expressway there was a single lane onramp. The design left the eastern end open for a future connection with the proposed but never-built Scarborough Expressway, leaving this segment a spur route. This then-terminus of the Gardiner was also where the provincial Highway 2 routing shifted back to Lake Shore Boulevard, until Highway 2 was decommissioned in 1998.

Highway 427 to the Humber River

This segment, built as part of the Queen Elizabeth Way by the Province of Ontario, was transferred to the City of Toronto in 1997, and designated as part of the Gardiner. The original QEW highway was built in the 1930s and connected to the Gardiner in the 1950s. This section of the QEW between the recently expanded Highway 27 (which would be renumbered as Highway 427 on December 4, 1971) and Lake Shore Boulevard was reconstructed in the late 1960s to 8-10 lanes which included a short collector-express system between Kipling Avenue and Royal York Road. The Humber River was the western border of the City of Toronto until the amalgamation of all Metropolitan Toronto municipalities into one Toronto.

=== Naming ===
On July 29, 1957, while still under construction, the Metro Toronto Roads and Traffic Committee, on the suggestion of Weston Mayor Harry Clark, (the committee chairman) renamed the Lakeshore Expressway to the F. G. Gardiner Freeway. Clark later suggested that the road had too many interchanges to be called a freeway, and amended the proposal to Gardiner Expressway. Metro Council approved the renaming in August 1957:

After we had finished arguing with [The Board of Trade], Courtland Elliot, the president, made his annual report. In it, he suggested the road should be named the Gardiner Expressway. Before that, somebody had wanted to name an old man's home after me. Somebody else had wanted to name a sewage plant after me. I didn't exactly like those ideas and so when the third one came along I accepted the honour.

— Fred Gardiner

=== From completion to the present ===
By 1963, the first rooftop billboards along the Expressway were built, targeting the daily 40,000 to 60,000 motorists. Companies paid up to $3,000 per month to locate their billboard. Today, there are dozens of neon signs, billboards and video boards in the proximity of the Expressway, mostly in the sections between Roncesvalles Avenue to Spadina Avenue and east of Jarvis Street.

Traffic volumes
	Direction	
Location	East	West
427/QEW to Kipling	111,654	113,699
Kipling to Royal York	110,140	102,586
Royal York to South Kingsway	97,713	108,325
South Kingsway to Parkside	80,559	88,002
Parkside to Dufferin	80,143	86,661
Dufferin to Strachan	77,852	76,712
Strachan to Bathurst	76,001	78,725
Bathurst to Spadina	62,907	61,657
Spadina to York	62,256	57,197
York to Yonge	42,812	54,190
Yonge to Jarvis	40,492	37,925
Sherbourne to Parliament	60,825	49,534
Parliament to DVP	55,420	54,144
To/from DVP	33,583	32,000
East of DVP	20,369	19,566
Average weekday traffic volume per 24-hour period in 2008

In 1965, 62 yellow 'call boxes', containing phones for emergency assistance, installed by the Ontario Motor League, were fixed to poles on the shoulders. These remained in operation until the 1990s. In 1994, the Road Emergency Services Communications Unit traffic management system began operation on the Gardiner and Lake Shore Boulevard and stranded motorists became quickly detected by the CCTV cameras and operators quickly dispatch assistance.

By 1966, rush hour traffic and collisions in the Jameson area meant that the Jameson westbound on-ramp was closed permanently during rush hours. That same year, after criticism of the safety of the expressway by Toronto coroner Morton Shulman, Metro started installing guardrails on the full length of the Gardiner and Don Valley expressways.

In 1968, the speed limit was proposed to be raised from 50 mph (80 km/h) to 55 mph (89 km/h) (today it is 90 km/h (56 mph). Journalists openly questioned whether anyone could reach that top speed with the "horrendous volume of traffic" during peak rush times.

In 1988, the unmaintained grassy hillside in the Sunnyside area on the north side of the Gardiner from Roncesvalles Avenue to Wilson Park Avenue was cleaned up and planted with floral logos, with 26 tonnes (29 short tons) of garbage removed in the process. The advertising, which pays for the maintenance and cleaning of the hillside, permits no slogans and no alcohol or tobacco logos. The logos are planted yew bushes and are maintained by an independent company on the land, which is owned by the Canadian National Railway.

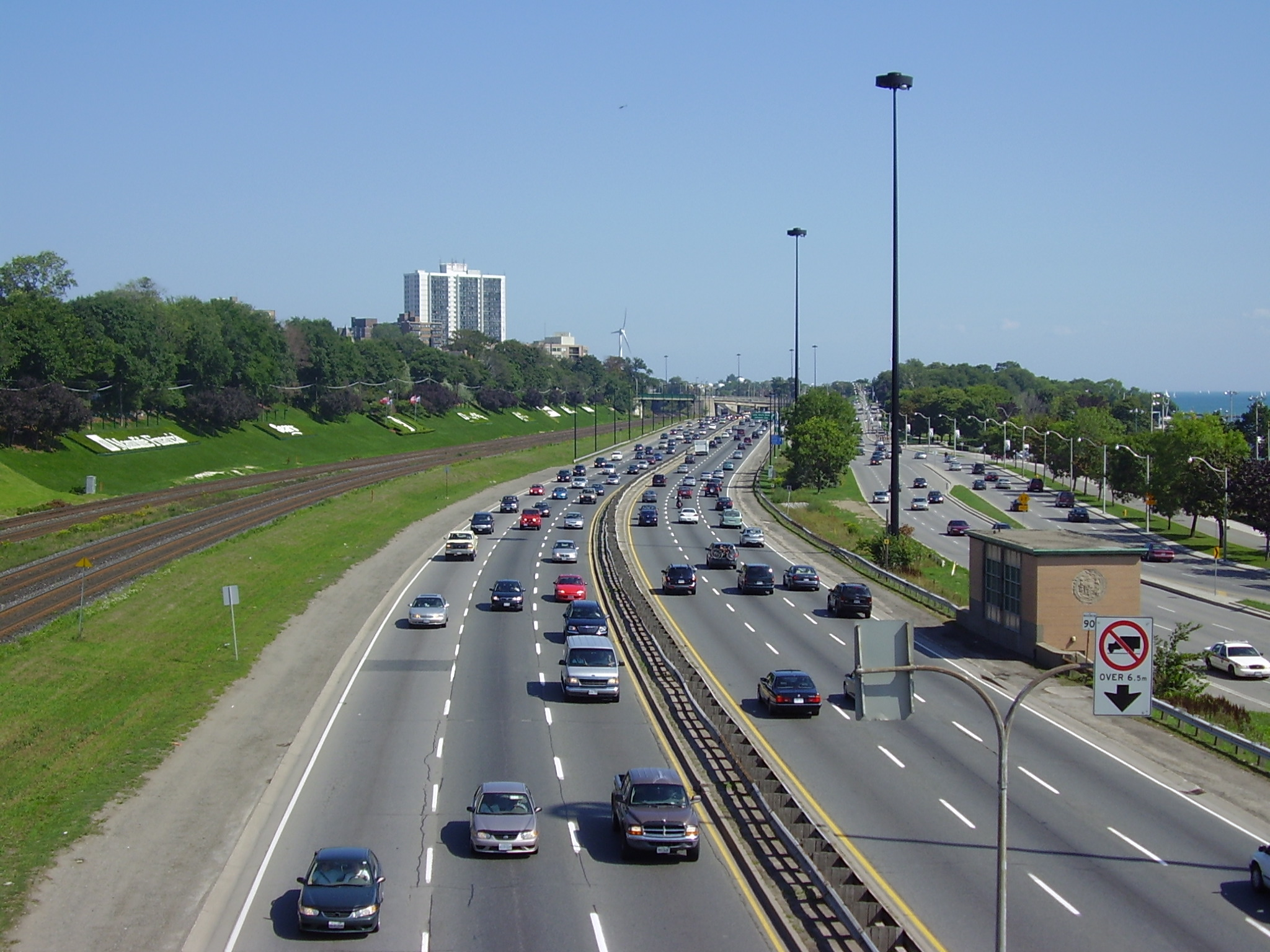
View of the Expressway, west of downtown Toronto

In the late 1980s, Metro Toronto proposed to widen the Gardiner to eight lanes from Strachan Avenue to the Humber, and extend Front Street from Bathurst Street west to connect with the highway. The widening proposal was never implemented as it depended on provincial funding which never materialized. Metro had planned the Front Street extension as part of allowing the Bay-Adelaide office complex and other development downtown to proceed. The Province did approve the Front Street extension, but the then-City of Toronto Council voted against it. The Front Street extension proposal was later resurrected as part of proposals to redevelop or dismantle the central section of the Gardiner.

The old Gardiner and Lake Shore Boulevard bridges over the Humber River, which had been in service since the 1950s, were removed and replaced by new structures from 1998-1999, at a cost of CA$100 (equivalent to $176.75 in 2025) million. The old bridge pillars, which were resting on soil, not on bedrock, had sunk by a metre, giving the eastbound Gardiner a roller-coaster ride or "Humber hump". Fatal collisions had occurred at the location, including an August 13, 1995, incident where a speeding automobile going eastbound became airborne and collided with a vehicle in the westbound lanes, killing three people. West of the Humber River, there was also a weaving problem on the westbound Gardiner due to an on-ramp from Lake Shore Boulevard followed by an off-ramp to Lake Shore Boulevard just before the CN rail underpass. As part of the Humber bridges replacement, the off-ramp (originally built in the 1960s as part of the QEW's widening) was extended and placed upon its own alignment with the exit shifted to before the Humber River, separating traffic from the on-ramp's entry point.

In the 1990s, after 30 years of usage, the City found that the central elevated section needed extensive repairs, and the ongoing maintenance was expensive. Proposals started to be floated for the demolition of the elevated segment with its replacement to be buried underground in a tunnel, although such a course of action would have left the Downtown without an east-west freeway for several years. In the end, city council voted to have the elevated section extensively rehabilitated and the elevated section in downtown Toronto was closed down for extensive repairs.

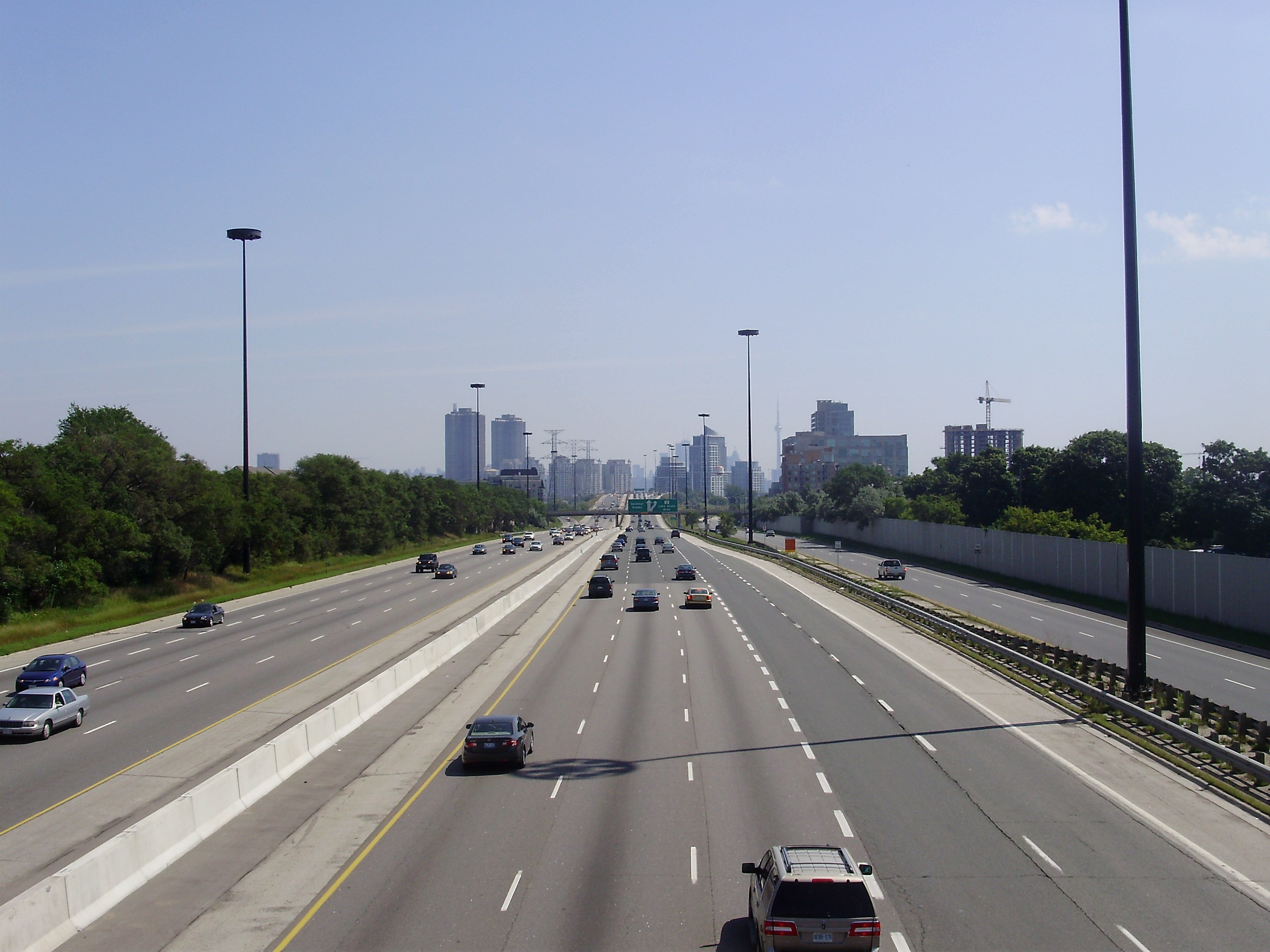
The Queen Elizabeth Way between Highway 427 and the Humber River became part of the Gardiner Expressway on April 1, 1997

On April 1, 1997, the stretch of the Queen Elizabeth Way between Highway 427 and the Humber River was downloaded from the Ministry of Transportation of Ontario to Metropolitan Toronto and was redesignated as part of the Gardiner.

Portions of the former QEW had parallel service roads along the roadway:

- Oxford Street – south side from east of Horner Avenue to Grand Avenue (broken sections)
- Mendota Road – north side from east of Royal York Road to Grand Avenue
- Queen Elizabeth Boulevard – north side from east of Islington Avenue to west of Royal York Road
- Fordhouse Boulevard – north side from east of The East Mall to Wickman Road
- Brockhouse Road – south side from east of The East Mall

The former QEW segment was not upgraded to contemporary standards when it was downloaded to the city, with particular concern over the old steel guard rail median barrier separating eastbound and westbound traffic. The steel guard rail dividing opposing traffic from The East Mall underpass and the Grand Avenue overpass was replaced by an Ontario "tall-wall" concrete barrier in early 2007, although steel guard rail still remains between the collector and express lanes. The city also replaced the province's late 1960s-era truss light poles with shaded high mast lighting (similar to the lighting on the Don Valley Parkway) west of Kipling Avenue and east of Royal York Road, while a rehabilitation project for the railway underpass east of Park Lawn Avenue took place from 2014-15.

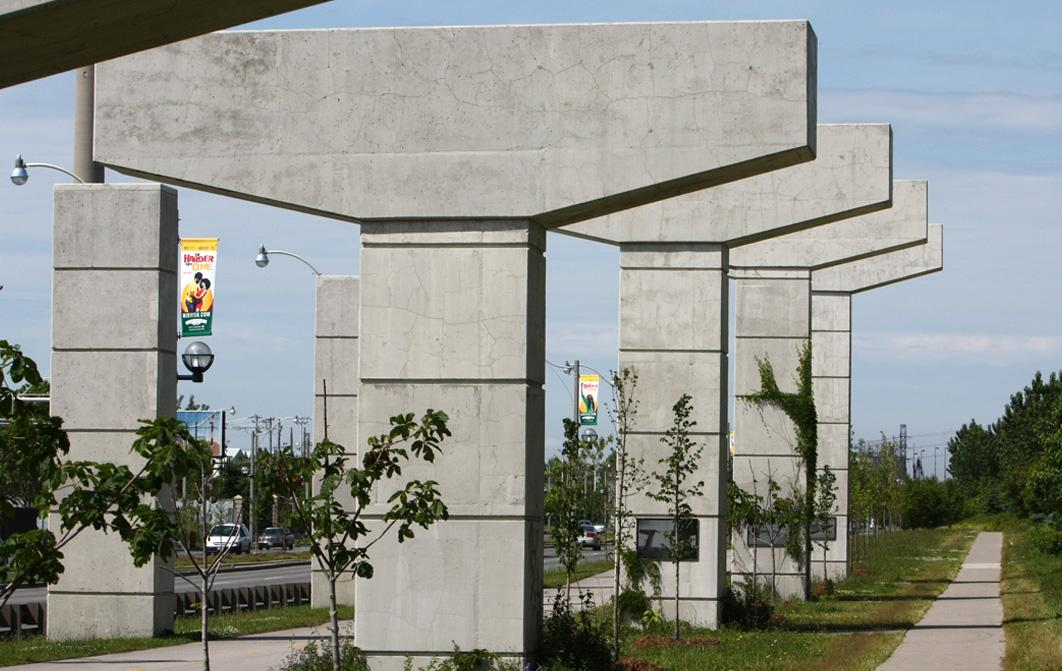
Pillars of demolished "Gardiner East" section remain as public art.

The elevated section between the Don River and Leslie Street known as "Gardiner East", intended for connection to the cancelled Scarborough Expressway, was eventually demolished in 2001. Demolition was first proposed in 1990 by the Crombie Commission and the Lake Shore-Gardiner Task Force. The segment was in need of expensive repairs and a 1996 environmental assessment determined that it would cost $48 million to refurbish the Gardiner from the Don Valley Parkway to Leslie St., but only $34 million to tear it down. The final cost of the demolition was $39 million. In the wake of the demolition of Gardiner East, Lake Shore Boulevard has been revealed from the cover of the highway. Green boulevards have been implemented along the wide thoroughfare. Several supportive concrete pillars of the demolished elevated expressway remain standing as public art. Paved bicycle paths extend eastward for approximately two kilometres from the Martin Goodman Trail at Cherry Street to Coxwell Avenue. In 2002, a dual on-and-off ramp structure known as the Logan Avenue Ramp was completed just west of Carlaw Avenue, allowing Gardiner eastbound traffic to descend and merge with Lake Shore Boulevard as well as the opposite movement.

In October 2021, the section of the Gardiner east of the Don Valley Parkway ramps was demolished, including the Don River crossing and the Logan Avenue Ramp terminus at Lake Shore Boulevard East. Lake Shore Boulevard is being reconstructed east of the Don River and at Cherry Street. In conjunction with this, the eastbound on-ramp from Lake Shore at Jarvis was closed. Other traffic measures to guide on-ramp and off-ramp traffic at Jarvis were implemented. Eventually, the elevated section from Cherry Street to the Don Valley Parkway is to be rebuilt, with new connections to Lake Shore Boulevard.

In March 2024, the City initiated a three-year project to rebuild the section between Dufferin Street and Strachan Avenue. The road is narrowed to two lanes in each direction, and the eastbound on-ramp from Lake Shore Boulevard is closed for the duration. Construction will take a pause during the 2026 FIFA World Cup.

=== Historic capacity ===
The highway has not been expanded since its initial construction. Commuting traffic into and out of the downtown core moves very slowly during the rush hours, which has led to growth in commuting by other modes. Introduced in the 1960s, the province's GO Transit has increased train frequency and capacity along the Lakeshore route to the point where GO now carries 19% of inbound commuters to downtown, while the Gardiner carries 8%. The TTC carries 47% of commuters and other auto routes account for 26% of inbound commuters, according to 2006 figures.

=== Elevated section maintenance ===
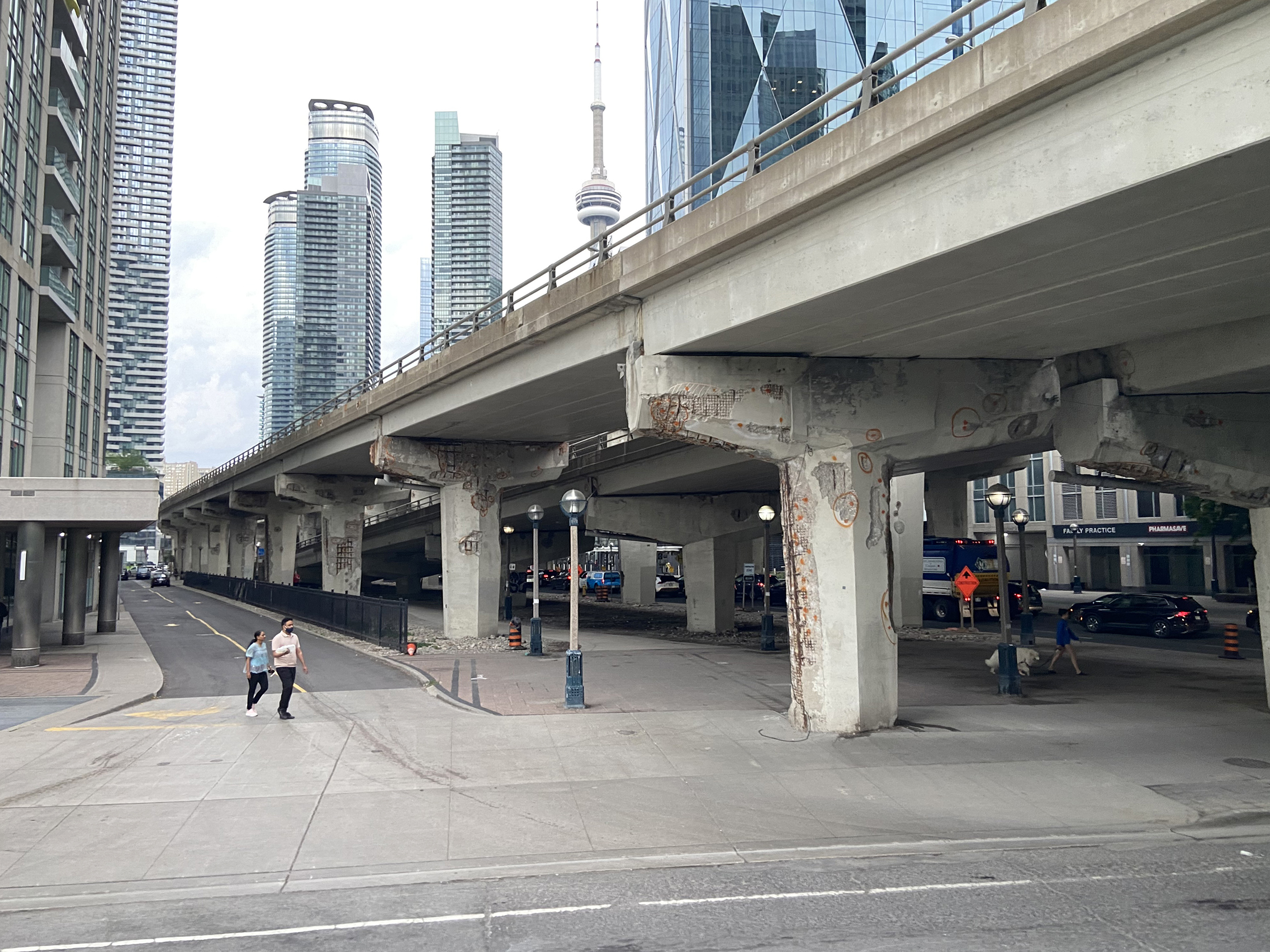
Elevated section superficial deterioration due to salt

The elevated section built with concrete girders was not built to withstand the use of road salt in the winter. The salt created corrosion of the steel within the concrete bents (vertical columns and horizontal caps), which expanded and weakened the steel and caused pieces of concrete to fall off. Remedial work had to be applied starting in the 1990s at a cost of CA$8 million per year. The remedial work included sealing expansion joints to force the salty water into the drains and extensive patching of the concrete columns. Exposed steel was sand-blasted and repainted.

The annual maintenance costs for the Gardiner Expressway were estimated in 2011 at CA$12 million per year. According to the City of Toronto, the City monitors the pillars on an ongoing basis and "re-coats" the pillars with new coatings of concrete, giving each new pillar an estimated 30 years of extended usage. A 4.5 kg (9.9 lb) section of concrete fell down onto Lake Shore Boulevard in June 2011. In May 2012, pieces fell from the elevated section near Jarvis, and a piece fell from the overpass over Parkside Drive. In June 2012, concrete fell from the elevated section at Yonge St. and Lake Shore Blvd. which struck a driver's vehicle causing minor damages.

One eastbound lane was closed near Cherry Street due to deterioration. The concrete parapet wall could no longer support the light standard in that location. The light standard was instead relocated into the rightmost lane, and the lane was closed. Two locations, at Fort York Boulevard and near Cherry Street were reinforced to prevent "punch-throughs" (holes) from happening on the road surface, potentially knocking a large piece of concrete to the ground below and causing a dangerous incident for the vehicles above. It was estimated in December 2012 by the City of Toronto Infrastructure Department that the Expressway has a backlog of CA$626 million in repairs. Starting in 2013, the City began to carry out CA$505 million worth of repairs over nine years. Temporary wood bracing and decking have been added to the underside of the road deck to prevent punch-throughs, but only provide a short term fix and will require a long term solution to prevent future deck collapse.

=== York/Bay/Yonge Streets ramps rebuild ===
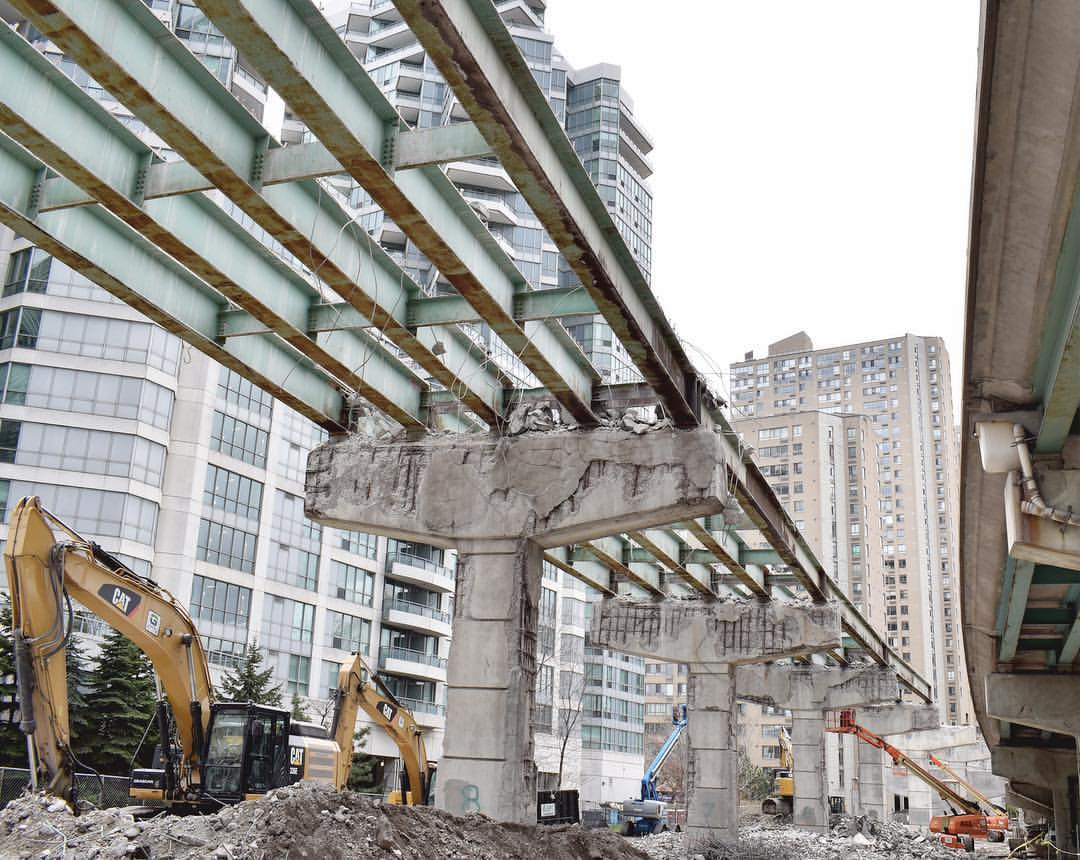
York/Bay/Yonge Ramp demolition

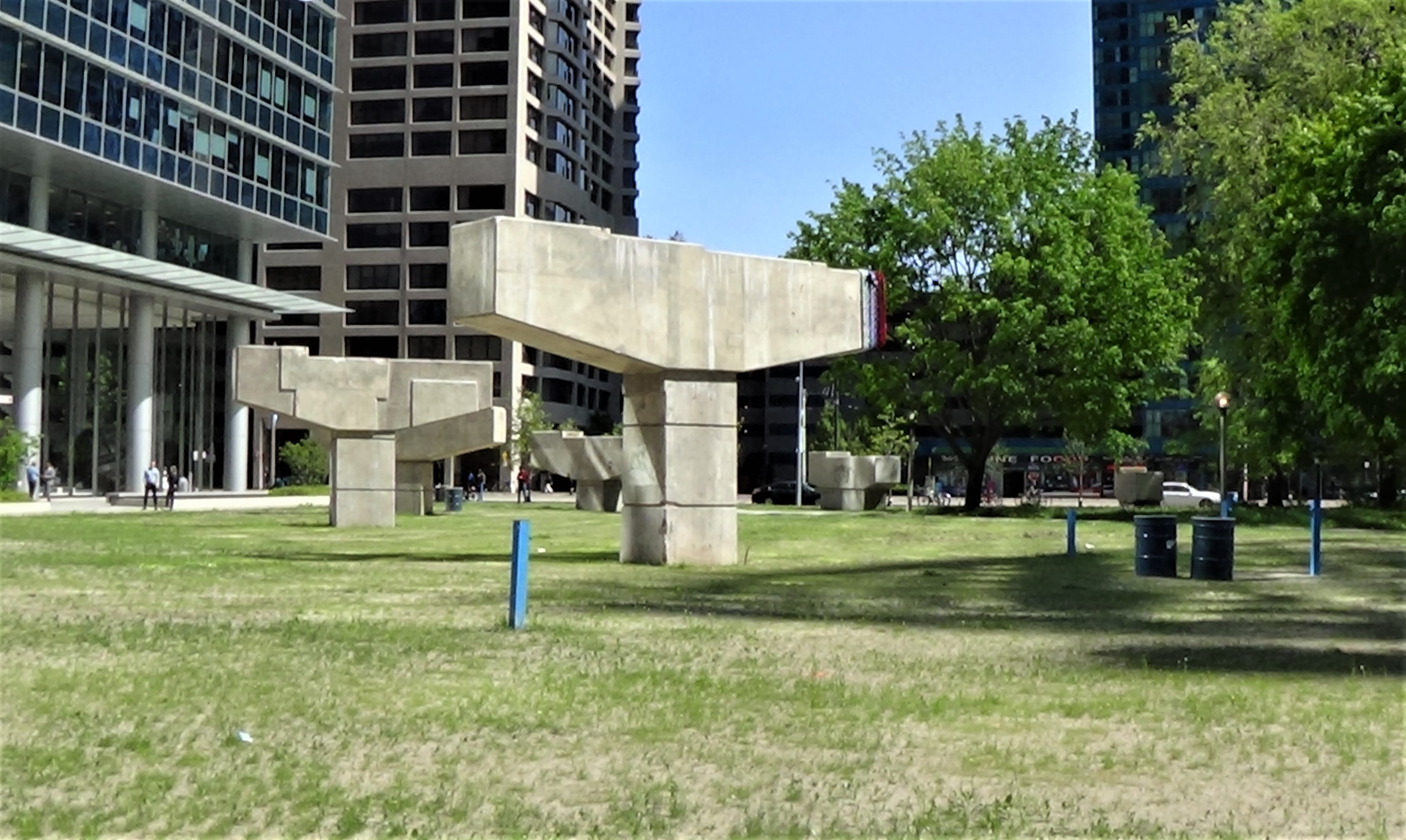
Supports from the demolished York Street loop ramp were kept temporarily

The original York/Bay/Yonge Streets off-ramp was nicknamed the "Hot Wheels ramp" among city staff, due to its looping around to York Street. In 2009, the City of Toronto commenced a study of the York/Bay/Yonge off-ramps and the Bay Street on-ramps "to support and enhance the pedestrian and park spaces in the immediate area while maintaining acceptable traffic capacity and operations". The preferred option identified in the study would be to reconfigure the off-ramp to connect at Simcoe Street, and close the on-ramp from northbound Bay Street to the eastbound Gardiner. The change to the ramps was approved in August 2010 by City Council. An Environmental Assessment was completed in 2013.

In 2016, the City of Toronto began construction work on the project. In phase one, the new off-ramp at Lower Simcoe Street was built to feed into a widened Harbour Street. The York/Bay/Yonge off-ramp started demolition in April 2017. This was followed by the widening of Harbour Street from three to four lanes. York Street Park was opened where the York Street off-ramp previously looped, although many of the support pillars were not removed. The York Street Park was built in 2022–23 according to the "Love Park" design chosen in 2018. The new off-ramp opened to traffic on January 28, 2018. The newly-christened Love Park opened in June 2023.

=== Gardiner Expressway Strategic Rehabilitation Plan ===
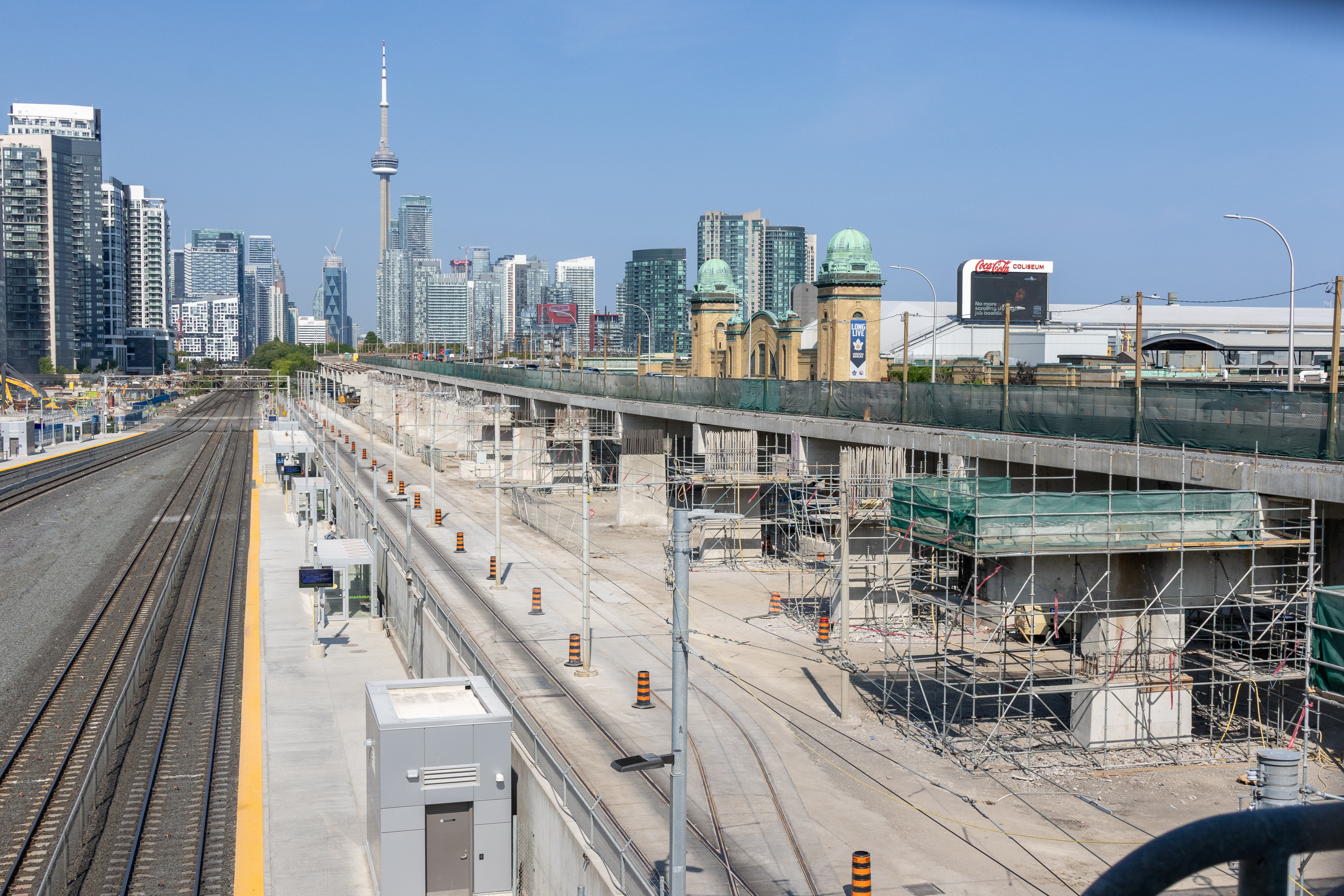
Rehabilitation of the Gardiner Expressway as seen from Exhibition station, June 2025

Starting in 2018, the City of Toronto has been rehabilitating the Gardiner from the 427 highway to the Don Valley Parkway. The project is known as the "Gardiner Expressway Strategic Rehabilitation Plan". The work is being done in stages and is already in progress:

1. Jarvis Street to Cherry Street - Replacement of the elevated portion. (complete)
2. Strachan Avenue to Dufferin Street (in progress) - Replacement of the elevated portion. (2024–2026) This will progress in three stages, replacing two lanes at a time. This was initially contracted to cost CA$260 million, in 2023 and take three years. Additional changes to the project to speed up completion by one year will add CA$73 million, to be paid by Ontario provincial government. The target is for completion before the 2026 FIFA World Cup in July 2026.
3. Highway 427 to the Humber River - Reconstruction of roadway and rehabilitation of several bridges. (2026–2029)
4. Grand Magazine Street to York Street - Replacement of the elevated portion. (2026–2028)
5. Cherry Street to the Don Valley Parkway (DVP) - Replacement of the elevated portion and the interchange with the DVP. (2026–2030) This includes the already completed demolition of the off-ramps to Logan Avenue.
6. Humber River to Dufferin Street - Undetermined rehabilitation. (2029–2030)

=== Transfer to province ===
In November 2016, the City of Toronto and mayor John Tory considered imposing a toll to use the Gardiner and the Don Valley Parkway, to cover the maintenance costs of the highway and support public transit construction. However, the plan was rejected by the Ontario government.

In November 2023, the municipal and provincial governments announced a tentative deal which will see responsibility for the Gardiner Expressway and Don Valley Parkway transferred to the province, with them to be maintained as provincial highways. In exchange, the City government accepted dropping its opposition to the Ontario Place and Ontario Science Centre redevelopments. This has meant that CA$1.9 billion in cost originally to be borne by the City of Toronto would instead be borne by the Ontario provincial government. The City intended to use the savings for various projects between 2024–2034, including CA$500 million for the TTC. Construction work on the expressway would be finished 18 months ahead of schedule, opening in late 2025.

== Future ==
Starting in the 1990s, several proposals have been made to dismantle or replace the central elevated section. Lack of municipal funds and political will have repeatedly stalled such plans.

In 1991, the Royal Commission On The Future of the Toronto Waterfront released a report entitled "Report 15: Toronto Central Waterfront Transportation Corridor Study". It determined that the combination of the Gardiner Expressway, Lake Shore Boulevard and railway uses tilted the land use to too much of a corridor use, and impacted negatively on the usage of the area. The report proposed that the City could A) retain or ameliorate; B) replace or C) remove the Expressway. The then-Metro Toronto and City of Toronto governments chose option "A" to retain or ameliorate.

=== Waterfront Revitalization Task Force demolition proposal ===
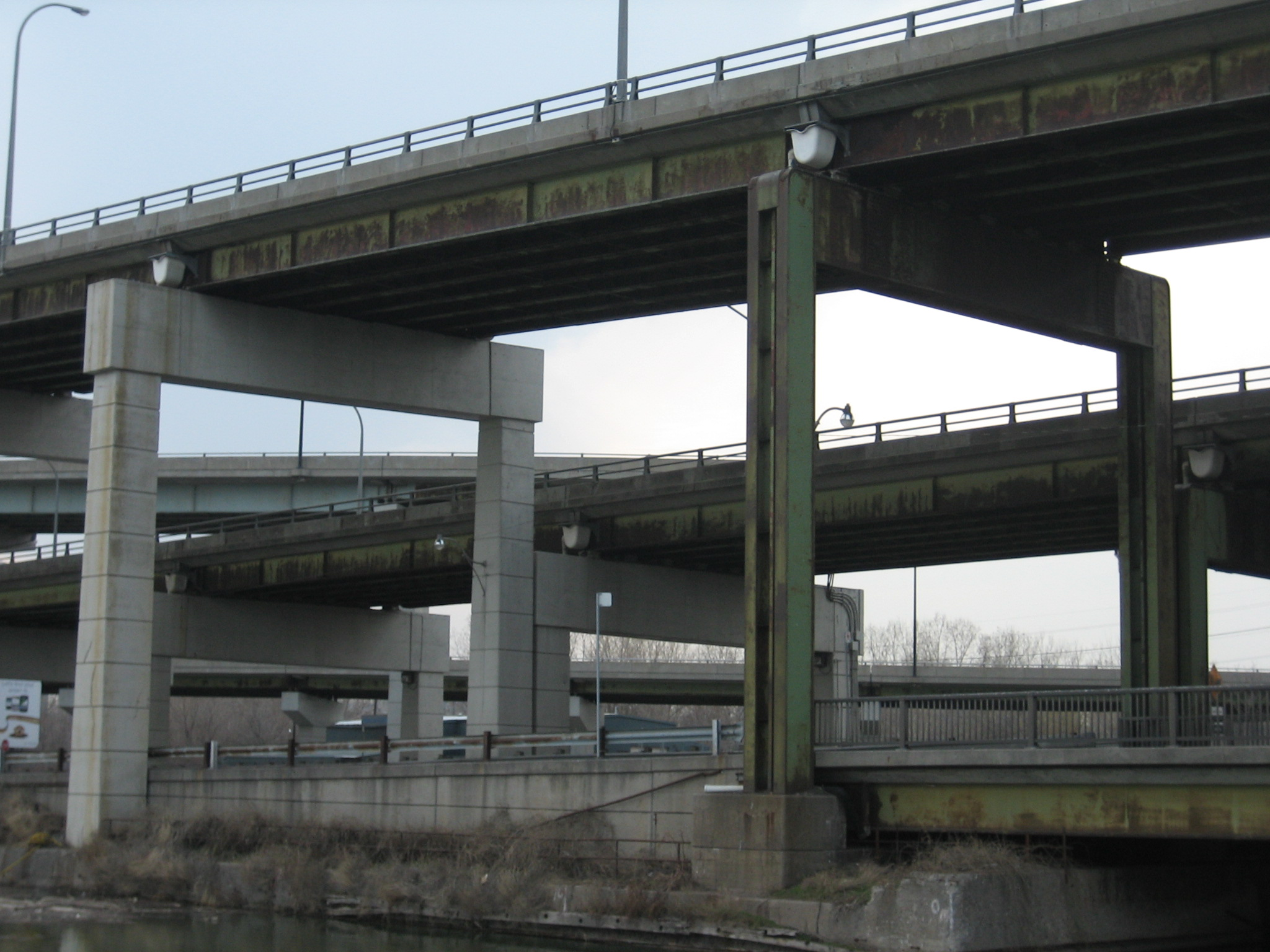
The easternmost section of the Gardiner that would later have been demolished and replaced

In March 2000, the Toronto Waterfront Revitalization Task Force proposed burying the section from east of the CNE to Yonge Street, as part of the plans for waterfront revitalization, at an estimated cost of $1.2 billion. The City of Toronto accepted the report in principle and formed the Toronto Waterfront Revitalization Corporation (TWRC), (today's Waterfront Toronto).

In 2004, the TWRC issued a report to the City about possible options for the Gardiner. It was released to the public in September 2006. It proposed four options:

1. Leave the Gardiner as is, at an annual cost of CA$12 million
2. Replace the roadway with at-grade or below grade roads at a total cost of CA$1.475 billion
3. Remove the Lake Shore Boulevard roadway underneath the elevated section and construct buildings at a cost of CA$65 million
4. Removing the Gardiner east of Spadina, and expanding Lake Shore Boulevard at a cost of CA$758 million. This was the TWRC's recommended option.

An overview of the recommended changes:

- retain elevated portions from west of Dufferin Street to Spadina Avenue
- extend Front Street west of Bathurst to connect with the Gardiner west of Strachan Avenue.
- add new on/off ramps to connect with Front Street extension
- replace elevated portion from Spadina Avenue to Simcoe Street with two five-lane roadway (Lake Shore Blvd) separated by landscaped median
- replace elevated portion from Simcoe Street to Jarvis Street with two five-lane roadway (Lake Shore Blvd) separated by city block
- replace elevated portion from Jarvis Street to Don River with two four-lane roadway (Lake Shore Blvd) separated by landscaped median
- relocate Don River channel and re-build new ramps onto the Don Valley Parkway with surface roadway (Lake Shore Blvd)

Councillor Jane Pitfield, who was running for Mayor, criticized the proposal, stating that "From the canvassing I have done all over the city, the majority of people say they want the Gardiner to stay where it is." Suburban councillors Gloria Lindsay Luby and Doug Holyday came out opposed while inner-city councillor Kyle Rae fought for the proposal. Mayor David Miller did not favour the proposal either, stating that there were other, higher priorities. The proposal did not come to Council for discussion and vote.

=== Replacement proposals ===
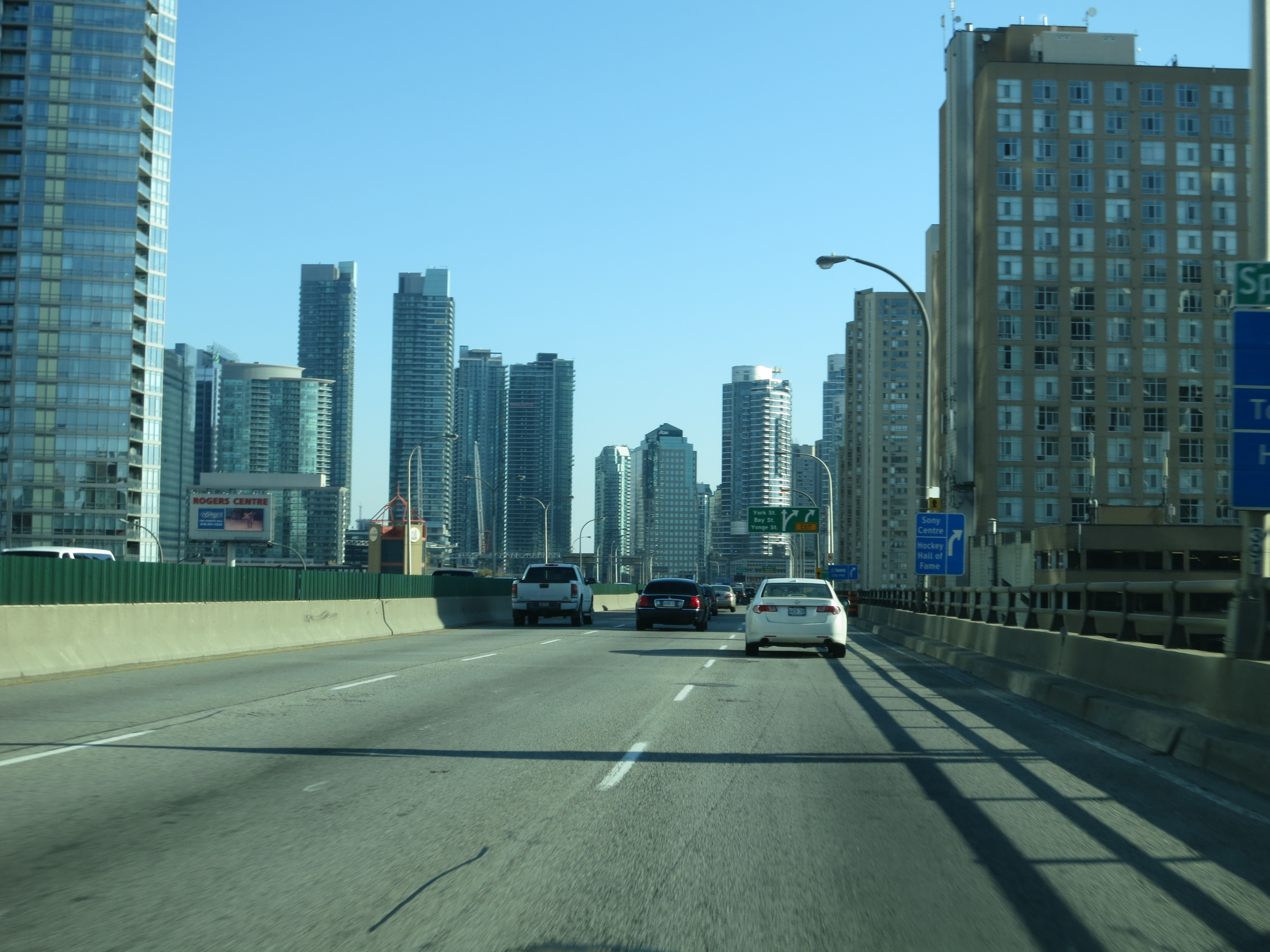
The Gardiner Expressway with dense development on both sides in downtown Toronto.

In 1996, the Crombie-led Waterfront Trust asked the builders (Canadian Highways International Corp) of the Highway 407 toll road to investigate replacing the Gardiner. The Corporation proposed a tunnel to replace the elevated section from Dufferin to Yonge Street at a cost of $1 billion. City staff pointed out that the tunnel would have to avoid several obstacles, including:

1. 12-foot-diameter (3.7 m) storm sewers just west of Fort York and under Portland Street;
2. a high-voltage electrical line under Strachan Avenue;
3. a filtered water intake to the John Street pumping station;
4. a streetcar line running under lower Bay Street;
5. a streetcar loop on the north side of the Exhibition Grounds; and
6. the Don River

The proposal planned to put tolls on the new roadway to pay for the cost of building it and to reduce the traffic but it refused (2017 update).

Unsolicited proposals are made regularly by citizens, agencies and corporations of Toronto.

In 2005, a proposal named the "Toronto Waterfront Viaduct" was presented by a group of Toronto citizens, calling for the replacement of the existing elevated expressway with an 8 to 10-lane cable-stayed viaduct over the Lakeshore rail corridor. This proposal combined the freeway with a new Lakeshore light rail transit system, and lanes for bicycle and pedestrian traffic. The proposed design used cantilever bridge structure to minimize disruption of the railroad. By building the replacement route on a parallel corridor, current traffic would not be disrupted.

Two proposals were made public in June 2009, when the City of Toronto Council was considering the proposal to tear down the eastern section. Mark Fraser, a Toronto CAD technician, and local resident opposed to the removal of the Gardiner, put forth a proposed design for a complete overhaul of the Gardiner he called the "Green Expressway". The design would consist of either a channel or tunnel built under the Gardiner with two levels of traffic (one for local highway traffic, and one for express traffic through the city), a ground-level local street, and a linear park and retail concourse built above the street.

Later in June 2009, Les Klein, a Toronto architect also opposed to the removal of the Gardiner, proposed adding an upper level deck covered with plants, bike lanes, walking paths and solar panels (for expressway lighting) on a 7 kilometres (4.3 mi) stretch of the expressway, entitled the 'Green Ribbon'. The estimated cost was between $500 million to $800 million.

=== Western Waterfront plan ===
The Western Waterfront Master Plan calls for reconstruction of the Jameson/Dunn interchange to place the eastbound lanes of Lake Shore Boulevard onto the north side of the Gardiner, moving the Jameson westbound exit east to British Columbia Drive, converting the Jameson Street bridge into a pedestrian overpass to reclaim approximately 9 hectares (22 acres) of parkland. The Master Plan passed a Class environmental assessment in 2009. The City started to replace several deteriorating structures in May 2010, to prepare the structures for the new roadway alignment. The construction of the realigned Lake Shore Boulevard and the related Gardiner ramp changes is slated for after 2014, after completion of a detailed environmental assessment for the parkland and roadway project.

In 2022, the City of Toronto published an update to the Western Waterfront Master Plan that outlined which proposals had had action taken and which ones had not. In 2023, the City of Toronto published an interactive map of the area, which was open for comment until December 13, 2023. The findings and proposed implementation recommendations are anticipated to be reported to the Infrastructure and Environment Committee in late 2024.

=== East of Jarvis review ===
In May 2008, Waterfront Toronto (the former TWRC) proposed the demolition of the segment from Jarvis Street to the Don River and construction of a widened Lake Shore Boulevard in the style of University Avenue at a projected cost of $200 to $300 million. The proposal shelved the previous plan to demolish the central section and the construction of the Front Street Extension. Waterfront Toronto proposed to get started on the environmental assessment of the demolition, which is expected to take up to five years and cost $10 million. Councillor Denzil Minnan-Wong criticized the proposal, pointing out that the city already had a $300 million backlog of road repairs. Mayor David Miller endorsed the proposal, noting that the funds for the demolition and the eight-lane boulevard would come from monies saved by not building the Front Street Extension, and money saved on the maintenance of the elevated highway. In July 2008, City Council voted to proceed with the environmental assessment. In March 2009, Waterfront Toronto started the environmental assessment consultation process, with open houses and an online consultation web site. The Terms of Reference were approved by City Council in May 2009 and the Government of Ontario in September 2009 and an Environmental Assessment was expected to start in April 2010.

City staff abandoned the Environmental Assessment in November 2010, to await direction from the new Council after the election of Rob Ford as Toronto mayor. Councillor Minnan-Wong, who had become chairman of the public works committee of Council, later described the removal project as "dead", and the estimated $300 million cost as "too expensive" in light of a $270 million backlog on repairs of Toronto roads. Minnan-Wong was further quoted as saying that "tearing down the Gardiner Expressway, an important and vital transportation corridor, doesn't make sense".

In 2013, as part of a staff report on condition the Gardiner, City staff reported to Council that a decision on the eastern segment would have to be made. The section was identified by staff as having reached the end of its lifespan, unless a significant rebuild were to be done. They estimated that it needed to be made no later than 2014 to co-ordinate with needed remedial work.

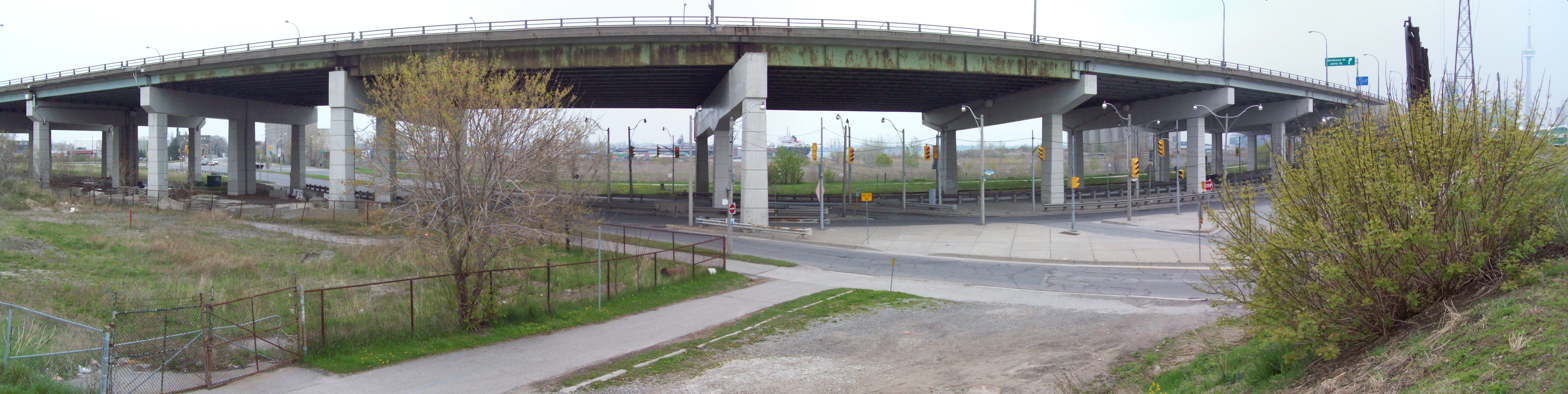
The "remove" option would have removed this section of the Gardiner, freeing up acres of waterfront property.

After consideration of the proposal to repair the elevated section, Council voted in January 2013 to 'restart' the environmental assessment of the section east of Jarvis. Waterfront Toronto was engaged to deliver public feedback on various proposals, that of keeping the Gardiner, reconfiguring it or demolishing it. After the review, the consensus proposal was to demolish the expressway section as being cost-effective with little impact on commuters. Before Council was to vote on the proposal, Council decided instead to direct City staff to study a "hybrid" proposal, keeping that part of the Gardiner connecting the expressway to the Don Valley Parkway (but replaced with new ramps beginning at Cherry and north of current structure), while demolishing the rest. Also this option will result in the extension of Queen's Quay east of Cherry Street to meet with Don Roadway.

City staff studied the hybrid proposal and reported on the cost of the three options over 100 years in April 2015. The cost of the hybrid proposal was estimated at $414 million for construction and $505 million for upkeep. The 'keep as-is' proposal was the next most expensive at $342 million for a rebuild and $522 million of the next 100 years. The demolish proposal was the least expensive at a total of $326 million immediately and $135 million for upkeep of a new surface boulevard. After public consultations, City Council is to vote on the proposals after a final report is delivered in June 2015 from city staff.

The review came to City Council for consideration at its June 2015 session. Prior to the meeting, several special interest groups weighed in with their opinions on the debate. A group of Toronto developers came out in favour of full removal. The Ontario Trucking Association and Canadian Automobile Association came out in favour of the "hybrid" option. Mayor John Tory announced he would support the "hybrid" option and speculation in the media was that the vote would be close between the "hybrid" and "remove" options. Debate started on June 10, 2015, and was completed on June 11, 2015. City Council voted 24–21 in favour of the "hybrid" option, 26–19 against the "remove" option, and 44–1 against the "maintain" option. To build support for the "hybrid" option among Councilors, Mayor Tory added proposals to direct City staff to study the routing of the connection to the Don Valley Parkway to try to retain as much development potential as possible compared to the "remove" option and report on the feasibility of tunnelling the section, something not even covered in the studies, and which would require a new environmental assessment and possibly a further delay. These passed as part of the approval of the "hybrid" option. Council has asked to receive the new studies for September 2015. As of January 2020, the removal of the section east of the DVP is not expected to start until 2024. In September 2015, staff returned with a report updating their progress on new routings for the hybrid proposal. Three new routes would free up more lands for development, with some external submissions received that will also be studied. Staff will report to Council committees in January 2016 and Council is expected to debate the matter again in February 2016. In July 2018, Aecon won a contract to carry out the revitalization of the expressway between Jarvis and Cherry Streets, and work was completed by the end of 2020.

Construction on the hybrid option commenced on August 31, 2021. This started with the closure and removal of the Gardiner Expressway's eastern terminus, the Don River crossing and Logan Avenue Ramp, and since then Gardiner traffic defaults to the Don Valley Parkway.

=== Lower Yonge Street Precinct study ===
The City of Toronto and Waterfront Toronto completed a study of the district between Lake Shore Boulevard and Queen's Quay from Yonge Street to Lower Jarvis Street. The block will be redeveloped from its current industrial/commercial use to residential/commercial usage. The large-scale development will affect the Gardiner Expressway connections and the local streets to accommodate the development. Among its recommendations are the removal of the eastbound Bay Street on-ramp, the shortening of the Lower Jarvis eastbound off-ramp to terminate at Yonge Street, the extension of Harbour Street east to Lower Jarvis. The current terminus at Yonge will require:

- demolition of the loading area behind the Toronto Star building with Pinnacle One Yonge condominium resulting in creating a clearance for Harbour Street from Yonge to Freeland Streets
- redevelopment of LCBO campus use land now used for LCBO warehouse, Head Office and retail store as LCBO moves to east side of Cooper Street as 100 Queen's Quay East. Current site to be become new development with warehouse retained and a new city park built on south half Harbour will be extended from Freeland to Cooper Streets.
- re-development of the Loblaws store and parking lot as two parcels of land. New road built east from Cooper to Jarvis Streets.

A major part of the change is the disconnection of Harbour Street from Lake Shore Boulevard (by removing the S-curve at Yonge) and tie-in to the street's eastern extension, and the extension of Church Street south via a tunnel (due to existing structures at Conger Coal Lane as well as railway tracks and Gardiner) to connect to Cooper Street at Lake Shore Boulevard. The Environmental Assessment completed in May 2018.

== Closures ==
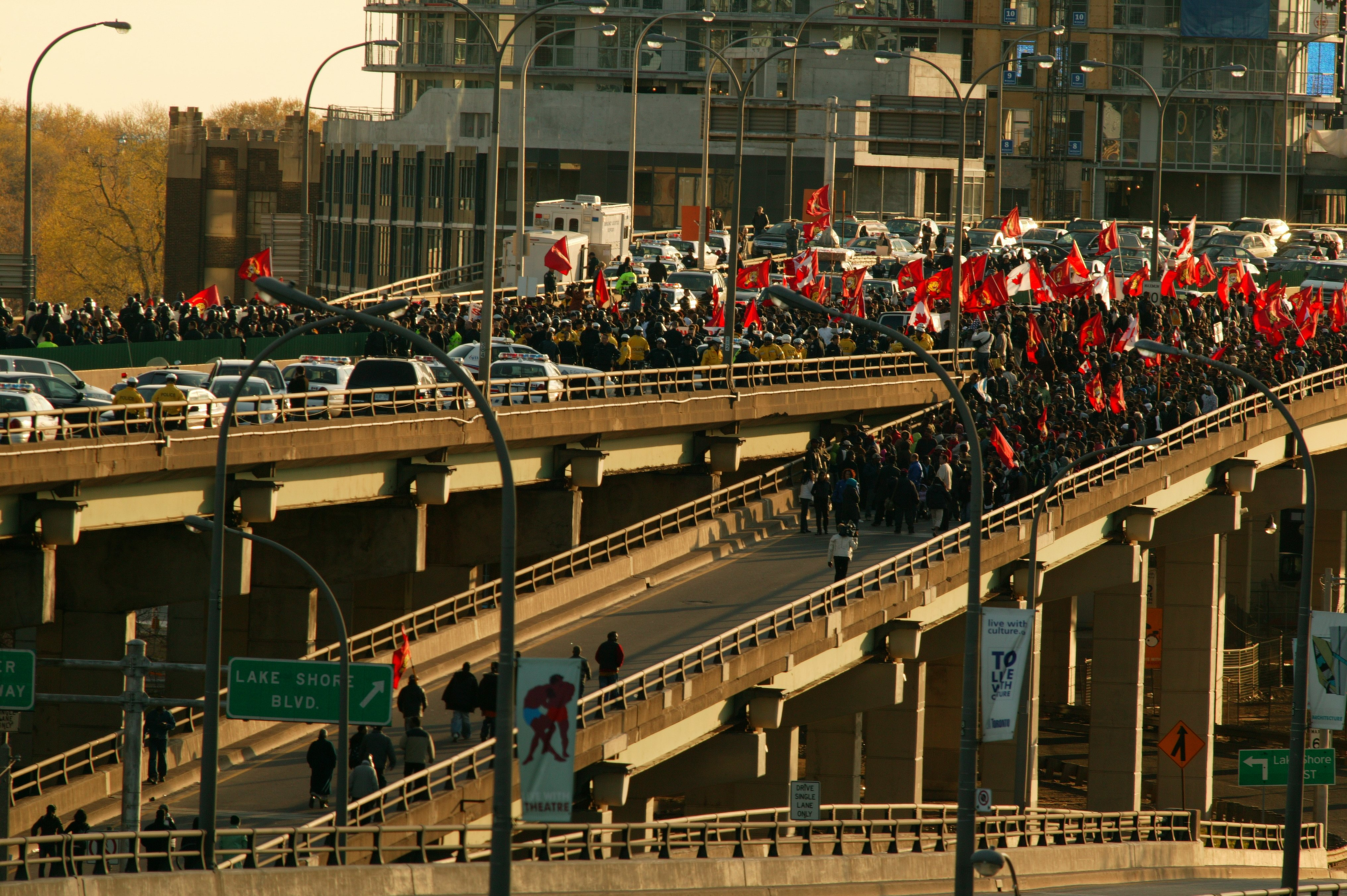
Protests against the Sri Lankan Civil War blocked the Gardiner Expressway in May 2009

The Gardiner Expressway and Don Valley Parkway close annually for two events. The Ride for Heart closes the Gardiner Expressway east of the Humber River and the entire length of the Don Valley Parkway in both directions and is typically held on the first Sunday in June from 2am to 2pm. The Toronto Triathlon Festival closes the eastbound lanes of the Gardiner Expressway east of the Humber River and the northbound lanes of the Don Valley Parkway south of Eglinton Avenue and is held on the third Sunday of July from 2 am to 12 pm. The annual closure of the Gardiner Expressway and Don Valley Parkway for Ride for Heart has been criticized for the amount of disruption it causes and its impact on traffic congestion. A Toronto City Councillor criticized the event and believes it should be relocated to city streets. This event also causes a complete shutdown of all GO bus service to Union GO Bus Terminal from 9 am to 2:30 pm on the day the event is held.

On March 5, 2007, a section of the Gardiner Expressway was closed between Spadina Avenue and Jarvis Street due to the threat of ice about the size of a kitchen table falling from the CN Tower. Several days before, a storm with snow and freezing rain had caused a great deal of ice to accrete on the tower. As the weather warmed and the sun heated the tower's concrete, large pieces of ice began falling off the tower and falling hundreds of metres to the ground below. Although nobody was injured, the Gardiner was closed as a precautionary measure. On March 6, cooler weather reduced the risk of falling ice, and prevailing wind conditions had changed, reducing the risks of ice falling onto the highway; the road was reopened subsequently.

On May 3, 2007, at around 7:00 a.m., a chunk of concrete about the size of a loaf of bread fell from the Kipling Avenue bridge onto the Gardiner Expressway. It missed cars and caused no damage, bouncing harmlessly away despite the morning rush hour traffic. City crews were quickly sent to close off lanes of traffic to begin an inspection of the structure, which is a late 1960s post-tensioned design built by the province while it was still part of the QEW. This incident raised fears about the safety of the highway, particularly with memories of the then-recent overpass collapse in Laval, Quebec.

On the evening of May 10, 2009, as part of the protests against the Sri Lankan Civil War, approximately 2,000 protestors blocked the downtown section of the Gardiner Expressway in both directions, leaving thousands of motorists stranded for several hours, and backing up traffic on the Expressway for several kilometres. Toronto Police chief Bill Blair called this demonstration by Tamil protestors on the Gardiner "unlawful" and "unsafe". Police forces from across the Greater Toronto Area including the Ontario Provincial Police were brought in for reinforcement. The highway was reopened shortly after midnight, when the protestors moved back to Queen's Park. This marked the first time that the Expressway was shut down due to a large-scale demonstration.

== Exit list ==
The following table lists the major junctions along the Gardiner Expressway. The entire route is located in Toronto.

km	mi	Exit	Destinations	Notes
0.0	0.0	—	Queen Elizabeth Way – Hamilton	Freeway and exit numbers continue from Queen Elizabeth Way
0.0	0.0	139	Highway 427 to Highway 401 – Pearson Airport	
0.0	0.0	139	Brown's Line, Sherway Gardens Road	Westbound exit and eastbound entrance
1.9	1.2	141	Kipling Avenue	Access via distributor lanes
3.0	1.9	142	Islington Avenue	Access via distributor lanes. Signed as exits 142A (south) and 142B (north)
5.2	3.2	144	Park Lawn Road	Eastbound exit via distributor lanes and westbound entrance
5.8	3.6	145	Lake Shore Boulevard	Westbound exit and eastbound entrance; formerly Highway 2 west; former western end of Highway 2 concurrency; former Queen Elizabeth Way Toronto terminus
6.7	4.2	146	Lake Shore Boulevard	Eastbound exit and westbound entrance
6.7	4.2	146	South Kingsway	Westbound exit and eastbound entrance; to Queensway
10.0	6.2	149	Jameson Avenue, Lake Shore Boulevard, Dunn Avenue	There are off-ramps from the eastbound Gardiner to eastbound Lake Shore, and from the westbound Gardiner to Dunn Avenue and Lake Shore Boulevard. There are two on-ramps to the eastbound Gardiner, one from the eastbound Lake Shore and one from the westbound Lake Shore. There is an on-ramp from the intersection of Jameson and Lake Shore to the westbound Gardiner. Two on-ramps are controlled at different times of day. On-ramps from westbound Lake Shore Boulevard to Gardiner are shut weekdays from 2pm to 7pm. On-ramps from eastbound Lake Shore Boulevard to Gardiner are shut weekdays from 7am to 9am. The on-ramp from the eastbound Lake Shore just east of Jameson to the eastbound Gardiner is shut until further notice due to construction which began in March 2024. The on-ramp from the westbound Lake Shore to the eastbound Gardiner remains open.
13.5	8.4	153	Spadina Avenue	No access is allowed to Lake Shore Boulevard from eastbound lanes.
14.3	8.9	154	York Street, Bay Street, Yonge Street (via Harbour Street)	Replaced former ramp closed on April 17, 2017, parallel to Harbour Street on southside, and looping ramp exit to northbound York Street or eastbound Harbour Street. Land for York ramp to become parkland. Opened January 28, 2018. To former Highway 11A north (York Street) / Highway 11 north (Yonge Street)
15.5	9.6	155	Jarvis Street, Sherbourne Street	Westbound exit to Jarvis/Sherbourne, eastbound entrance from Jarvis
17.3	10.7	—	Don Valley Parkway north	Freeway continues as Don Valley Parkway
17.3	10.7	157	Lake Shore Boulevard	Formerly Highway 2 east; exit permanently closed August 31, 2021
1.000 mi = 1.609 km; 1.000 km = 0.621 mi: Closed/former; Incomplete access; Route transition

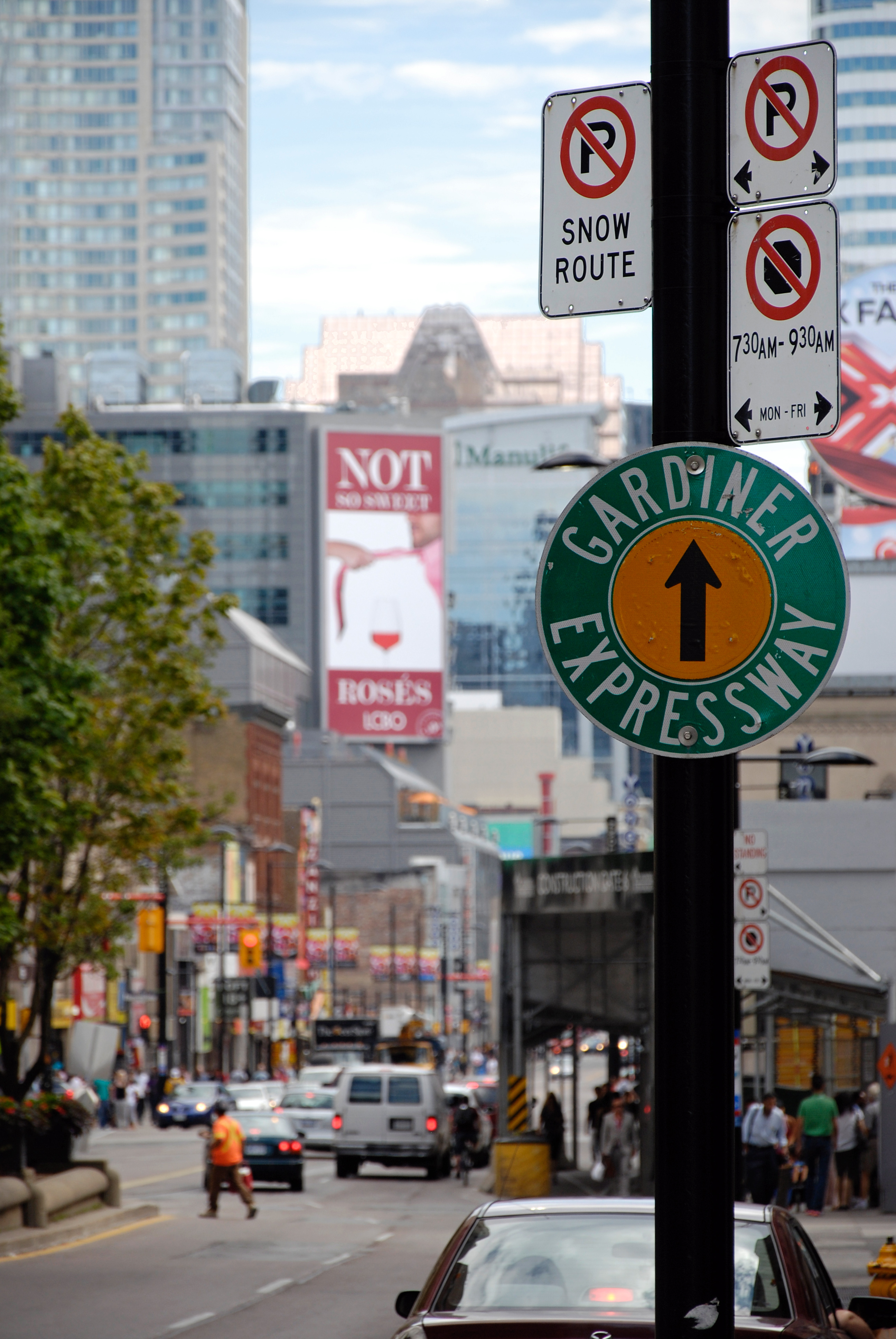
A trailblazer for the Gardiner Expressway on Yonge Street.

== See also ==
- Allen Road
- Don Valley Parkway
