= Protests in Canada against the Sri Lankan civil war =

Anti-war demonstrations, chiefly by the Tamil diaspora in major Canadian cities

Protests in Canada against the Sri Lankan Civil War
- Part of Protests against the Sri Lankan Civil War
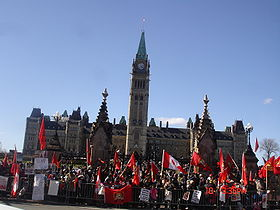
- Protesters at Parliament Hill in Ottawa, Ontario, Canada
- Date: January 28, 2009 — October 13, 2009
- Location: Toronto and Ottawa, Ontario, Canada
- Goals: End the Sri Lankan Civil War, restore civil rights for Tamils in Sri Lanka, and investigate war crimes by Sri Lanka
- Methods: Non violent protest, student protest, occupation, sit-in, demonstration, Internet activism, human chain, hunger strike

Protests in Canada against the Sri Lankan Civil War, often referred to as the Tamil protests by the media, consisted of a series of demonstrations which took place in major Canadian cities with a significant Tamil diaspora population during the year 2009 protesting the alleged genocide of Sri Lankan Tamil people in the Northern Province and Eastern Province of the island nation Sri Lanka. It was part of a global outcry by the Tamil diaspora to end the Sri Lankan Civil War, investigate acts of war crimes by the Government of Sri Lanka, and restore civil rights for Tamils in Sri Lanka. The aim was also to create awareness and appeal to leaders, notably the Prime Minister of Canada, Stephen Harper, the President of the United States, Barack Obama and the Consulate General of Sri Lanka in Canada, Bandula Jayasekara, to take action in ending the conflict. Several Tamil Canadian citizens and business owners from different parts of Canada and the United States took part in major protests set up in Toronto and Ottawa, while smaller scale demonstrations took place in Montreal, Vancouver and Calgary.

The first notable demonstration took place on 28 January 2009 in front of the Sri Lankan Consulate in Toronto involving a few hundred people. The following day, several thousands gathered in front of the Consulate of the United States in Toronto to appeal to the Government of the United States to take action on ending the civil war. A 5-kilometre (3.1-mile) human chain of several thousands of citizens took place the next day along major streets in Downtown Toronto. There after, demonstrations began to escalate in size and occurred on Parliament Hill in Ottawa for some time, until returning to continue in Toronto. Other tactics by protesters included sit-ins, hunger strikes, Internet activism and occupation of major streets.

== Major events ==
=== Early demonstrations ===
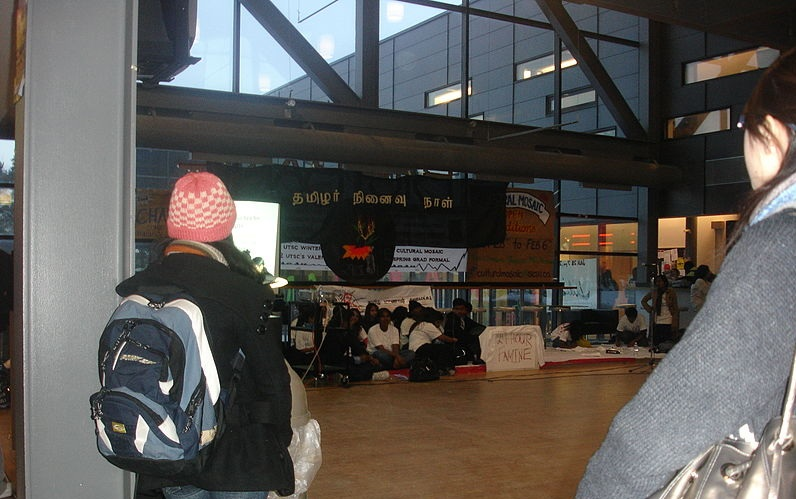
Tamil students conduct a hunger strike at the University of Toronto Scarborough on 27 January 2009

In the Greater Toronto Area, local Tamil communities and organizations began to set up demonstrations by January 2009, following similar movements in the United Kingdom and India regarding the large civilian casualties from the Sri Lankan Civil War. Tamil Student Associations at the University of Toronto and Ryerson University staged demonstrations on campus to promote awareness of the ethnic conflict to fellow students. During the week of 25 January, several Tamil media outlets announced a strike, requesting all Tamils to not attend work or school during the week and take part in the protests that would happen in Toronto, Montreal, Vancouver and Calgary.

On 28 January, several Tamils gathered in front of the Consulate of Sri Lanka in Toronto to protest, with hopes to meet the consulate general. However, the consulate general, Bandula Jayasekara, reportedly termed the protesters as "terrorists" and refused to admit them. The protest resumed until the evening. The following day, 29 January, several protesters gathered in front of the Consulate of the United States throughout the day, appealing to the consulate general of the United States to pressure its government to take an action on ending the war.

The next demonstration took the form of a human chain on 30 January in Downtown Toronto, comprising thousands of protesters along parts of Yonge Street, Front Street and University Avenue. Slogans such as "We want justice", "Sri Lanka, end the war" and "Canada help us" were chanted by the protesters across the streets. According to a Toronto Police Service spokesperson, "the protest took place in a very peaceful and orderly manner."

=== Parliament Hill protests ===
The first major protest in Ottawa, the capital city of Canada, took place on 4 February 2009 at Parliament Hill in an effort to attract the attention of Canada's parliament members. Thousands of Tamils gathered in front of the Peace Tower, subsequently drawing out a few politicians from inside, notably Bev Oda and New Democratic Party (NDP) leader Jack Layton. Layton announced that he would call parliament to an emergency debate at the House of Commons. Oda announced that the government would provide financial aid to the affected civilians, with the help of World Vision and Médecins Sans Frontières.

On 6 April 2009, a non-stop, continuous demonstration began at Parliament Hill, organized by Tamil Student Associations and the Canadian Tamil Congress. The protest, similar to non-stop demonstrations that were contemporaneously held elsewhere in the world, such as London and Sydney, saw bus-loads of protesters joining. Ottawa Police Service, Ontario Provincial Police (OPP) and the Royal Canadian Mounted Police (RCMP) oversaw the protests, which were deemed "peaceful." On 7 April 2009, Albert Street was blocked when Tamil demonstrators surrounded a Société de transport de l'Outaouais bus in the intersection at Elgin Street, which caused major detours of transit buses. As of 20 April, the non-stop protest took its fourteenth consecutive day. A few streets in the vicinity of Parliament Hill had closed down to make way for demonstrators. The protest was the decision by several Tamil organizations after the Government of Sri Lanka ruled out a ceasefire and allegedly forced an attack in Northern Sri Lanka with an unknown chemical warfare substance, claiming the lives of nearly 2,000 civilians. Five protesters of varying ages also began fast-unto-death hunger strikes, but were forced to end ten days later due to deteriorating health. The protest was expected to continue until the Government of Canada forced negotiations with the Government of Sri Lanka.

After a climactic protest with an estimated 30,000 protesters at Parliament Hill on 21 April, the "non-stop protest" in Ottawa came to an end. Ottawa City Councillor Eli El-Chantiry announced the policing costs for the protest to be nearly C$800,000 which the federal government was expected to pay.

=== University Avenue sit-ins ===
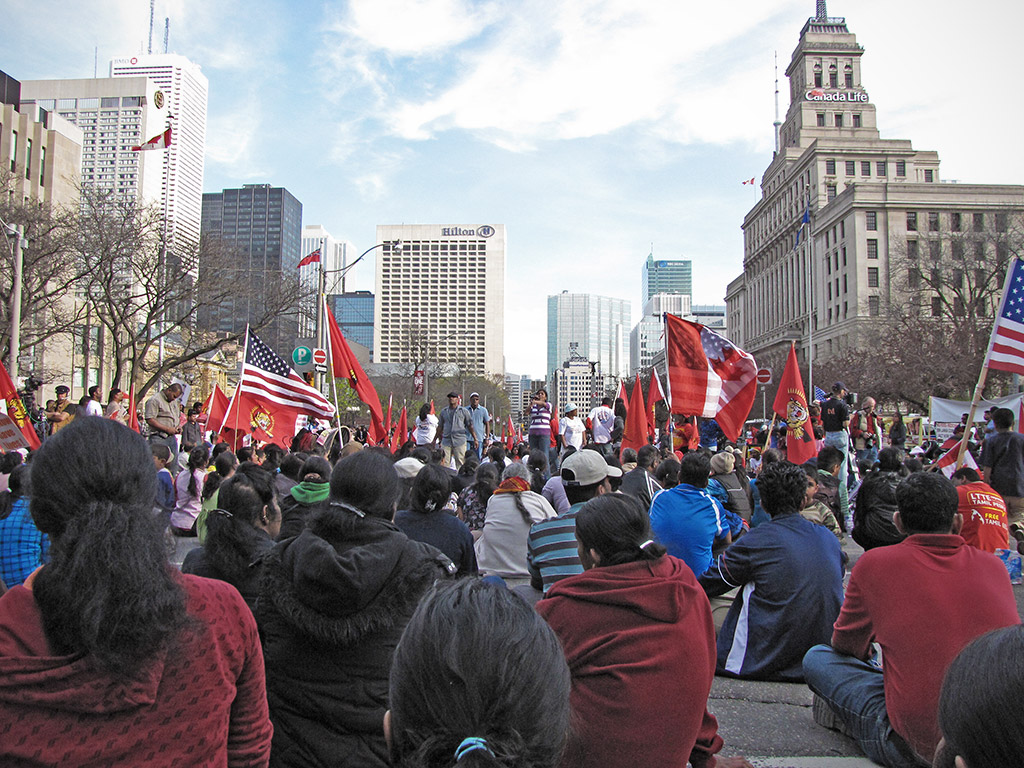
Protesters occupying University Avenue in Toronto on 29 April 2009

A week after the non-stop protests in Ottawa ended, non-stop protests began on the evening of 26 April in front of the Consulate of the United States in Toronto, urging Barack Obama to call for an immediate permanent ceasefire. Protesters sat down on University Avenue, occupying a large portion of the street. On the third day of the non-stop protest (29 April), fifteen arrests were made while one woman was injured after a brief scuffle with police. This incident was the first one to happen among these protests in Canada. The protests later shifted to Queen's Park with a diminished number of protesters.

Another major human chain, which was expected to occur 5 May, was abruptly postponed the previous night by organizers because of the impact of previous demonstrations. The cancellation was reported throughout Facebook, Twitter, Tamil television and radio stations and word of mouth. Some thought the cancellation was because of the recent swine flu outbreak. The postponed human chain demonstration instead took place on 9 May through Downtown Toronto, reminiscent of the one that occurred on 30 January.

=== Gardiner Expressway blockade ===
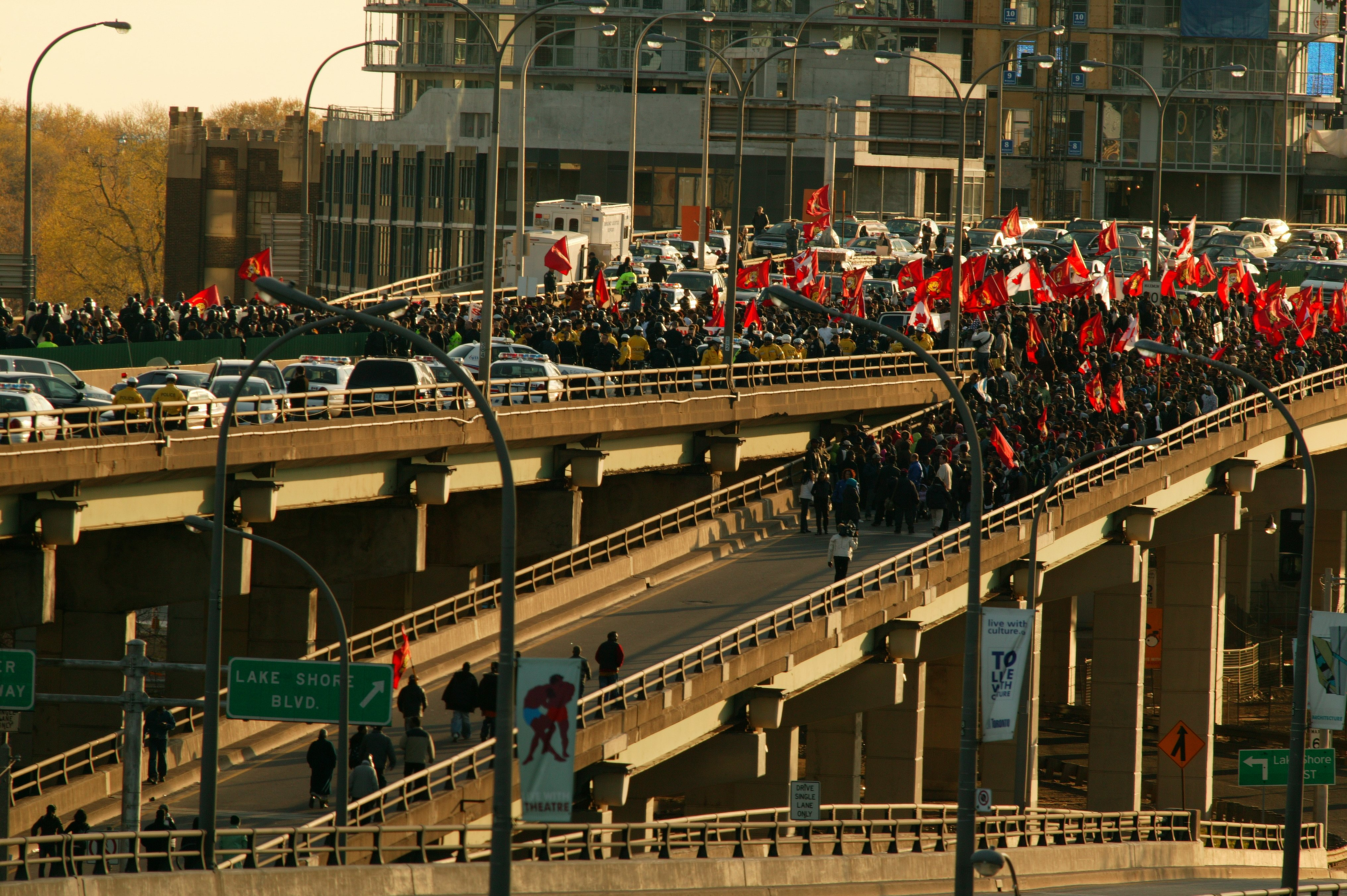
Protesters blocking vehicular traffic on the Gardiner Expressway on 10 May 2009

On 10 May, an immediate vigil and protest was launched in light of international reports of the shelling of Tamil civilians in the Sri Lanka Army-declared safe zone in which 378 civilians had been killed, while protesters claimed it to be nearly 3,000. The protest began on Spadina Avenue but abruptly spread past police cordons onto the Gardiner Expressway, a busy freeway in the city, bringing all vehicular traffic to a halt. The protesters, including women and children in strollers, said they would not stop blocking the Gardiner Expressway until they met with a representative from Premier Dalton McGuinty's office and got a promise for a clear course of action to stop the civil war in Sri Lanka. Police subsequently shut down the Gardiner Expressway and Toronto's Don Valley Parkway, causing heavy traffic congestions throughout other Toronto streets and highways.

York Regional Police, Peel Regional Police and the OPP were called in for back-up policing. It was the first time a major highway was unlawfully occupied in the city. CP24 aired the protest live as breaking news coverage throughout the evening. The protest continued throughout the night, demanding an immediate response to the latest casualties in Sri Lanka. The highway was cleared and reopened after a message from the Liberal Party of Canada stated that they would make a statement on the issue soon. Three individuals were arrested during the protest for assaulting a police officer while on duty.

The next day, peaceful protests continued in front of the Consulate of Sri Lanka on the sidewalk of Spadina Avenue and at Queen's Park simultaneously. York Regional Police, Peel Regional Police, the OPP and the RCMP continued to help Toronto Police Service to prevent civil disobedience such as what had happened the previous night. Toronto Mayor David Miller urged that such tactics as blockading the Gardiner Expressway not be used again. Police officials decried the use of children during such dangerous tactics.

=== Queen's Park rally ===
On 13 May several thousands of protesters crowded in front of Queen's Park protesting another offensive by the Sri Lanka Army, resulting in a situation which was termed by the United Nations as a "bloodbath." Traffic was blocked and police forces with riot control mounted on horses were present. After demonstrations took place at Queen's Park, the protesters flooded portions of College Street, Yonge Street, Queen Street and University Avenue for a march. The immediate demands of the protest were to call for an immediate permanent ceasefire, allow media and journalists into the warzone and to place diplomatic sanctions on Sri Lanka. The protesters also ran a food drive, asking for non-perishable food items. David Miller attended the protest and remarked, "some people would probably be offended by the flag and afraid to show their support for these people, but I'm not here about politics." The very same day, Barack Obama made a statement on the Sri Lankan Civil War, calling upon the Sri Lanka Army and the Liberation Tigers of Tamil Eelam (LTTE) to stop the "bloodbath" and to stop the use of human shields.

Toronto's Sinhalese community set up a counter-demonstration, condemning the Tamil protesters. The counter-protesters flew a private airplane with a banner attached to it reading "Protect Canada – Stop the Tamil Tigers", circling Queen's Park for some time. In May 2009, a Sinhala-Buddhist temple in Scarborough was set on fire, allegedly by LTTE supporters, and a worshipper claimed that the incident was part of a global pattern of violence against Sinhalese wherever there were mass Tamil demonstrations. However, a Tamil protest leader denied that anyone in her community would resort to such action.

== Post-civil war ==
After the march from Queen's Park, protests continued in front of the Consulate of the United States in Toronto, even after Sri Lankan president Mahinda Rajapakse declared a victory over the LTTE on 17 May, which officially marked the end of the Sri Lankan Civil War. Post-civil war, the goal of the protests was to ensure peace and better treatment of Tamil civilians and investigate war crimes by the Government of Sri Lanka. Protests also continuously happened in front of the Consulate of the United States in Montreal. Protesters held non-stop protests, urging Stephen Harper, who had not yet given any remarks on protests, to make a statement on the issue and request immediate humanitarian aid to be sent to the island nation. The Canadian Tamil Congress urged the European Union for a unanimous investigation of war crimes. Canada's Minister of Foreign Affairs Lawrence Cannon reflected by announcing that "Canada would work with the United States helping the United Nations deliver humanitarian aid to Sri Lanka." In the meantime, Toronto's Sinhalese community continued to hold counter-Tamil protests, claiming that they were in danger by the LTTE.

Throughout the remainder of 2009, the protests continued but became smaller as attendance decreased to about two dozen at most, happening only in front of the Consulate of the United States on University Avenue, and only during the daytime. On the 150th day, petitions were given out to protesters to sign, as they were in many other Tamil diaspora demonstrations around the world, and given to a guard at the Consulate of the United States. As of 13 October, the protest had reached its 173rd day.

== Impact ==
=== Canadian government response ===
During the first Parliament Hill protest in Ottawa, Jack Layton had called for an emergency debate on 4 February, gathering all members of parliament at the House of Commons. It had occurred despite the absence of Prime Minister Stephen Harper. A few members of parliament, such as John McCallum and Robert Oliphant, brought up concerns of whether the aid the government sends, which was announced to be C$3 million, would successfully reach the affected civilians or not. Canada's Minister of State for the Americas Peter Kent, in an argument, suggested that extortions and funds underlying of the LTTE may still be present in Toronto. Immediately, Liberal member of parliament Jim Karygiannis assured that there were no cases of such extortions in recent times after phoning a few national security agencies. Kent reflected back, saying that both the LTTE and the Sri Lanka Army must drop their weapons in order for the war to end. Karygiannis stated that the wish of his constituency, Scarborough—Agincourt, was that the ceasefire should not be initiated by the Government of Sri Lanka or by the Government of India but should be a United Nations-initiated, internationally sponsored ceasefire. Liberal member of parliament Irwin Cotler condemned Sri Lanka's restrictions on international humanitarian aid, journalists and media to reach the affected areas of northern Sri Lanka, which has been in place for several years. He suggested to bring forth an immediate ceasefire and begin negotiation talks. The United Nations, too, were condemned for not taking an active part in ending the civil war. Deepak Obhrai, a Conservative member of parliament, was the only member to label the LTTE at fault, referring to the assassination of former Indian Prime Minister Rajiv Gandhi in 1991.

A final report from the debate outlined four recommendations of action:

1. The Government of Canada should continue to call upon all parties in Sri Lanka to immediately cease fire and end hostilities.
2. The Government of Canada should redouble its efforts in cooperation with other states to meet the humanitarian needs of all civilians in northeastern Sri Lanka, including those still in the combat zone and those in IDP camps, by securing a sufficient humanitarian pause and through international supervision of assistance.
3. The Government of Canada should stand ready to increase Canadian assistance to Sri Lanka in collaboration with other partners, as on-the-ground assessments and capacity to absorb warrant, not only for relief purposes but also for development and reconstruction. In addition to ensuring that assistance reaches those who need it most, the government should pursue a whole-of-government strategy to ensure that Canadian assistance of all sorts encourages longer-term reconciliation among communities in Sri Lanka.
4. The Government of Canada should call on the United Nations Security Council to seriously engage itself in the resolution of the conflict in Sri Lanka, and to investigate the conduct of both parties during the conflict with respect to international law. The Government of Canada should also initiate a dialogue with the Government of Sri Lanka, in conjunction with the international community, aimed at laying the groundwork for a political reconciliation between the communities. If these efforts fail, the Government of Canada should consider financial and diplomatic sanctions, including, but not limited to, advocating for Sri Lanka's suspension from the Commonwealth, as well as incentives.

=== Other political remarks ===
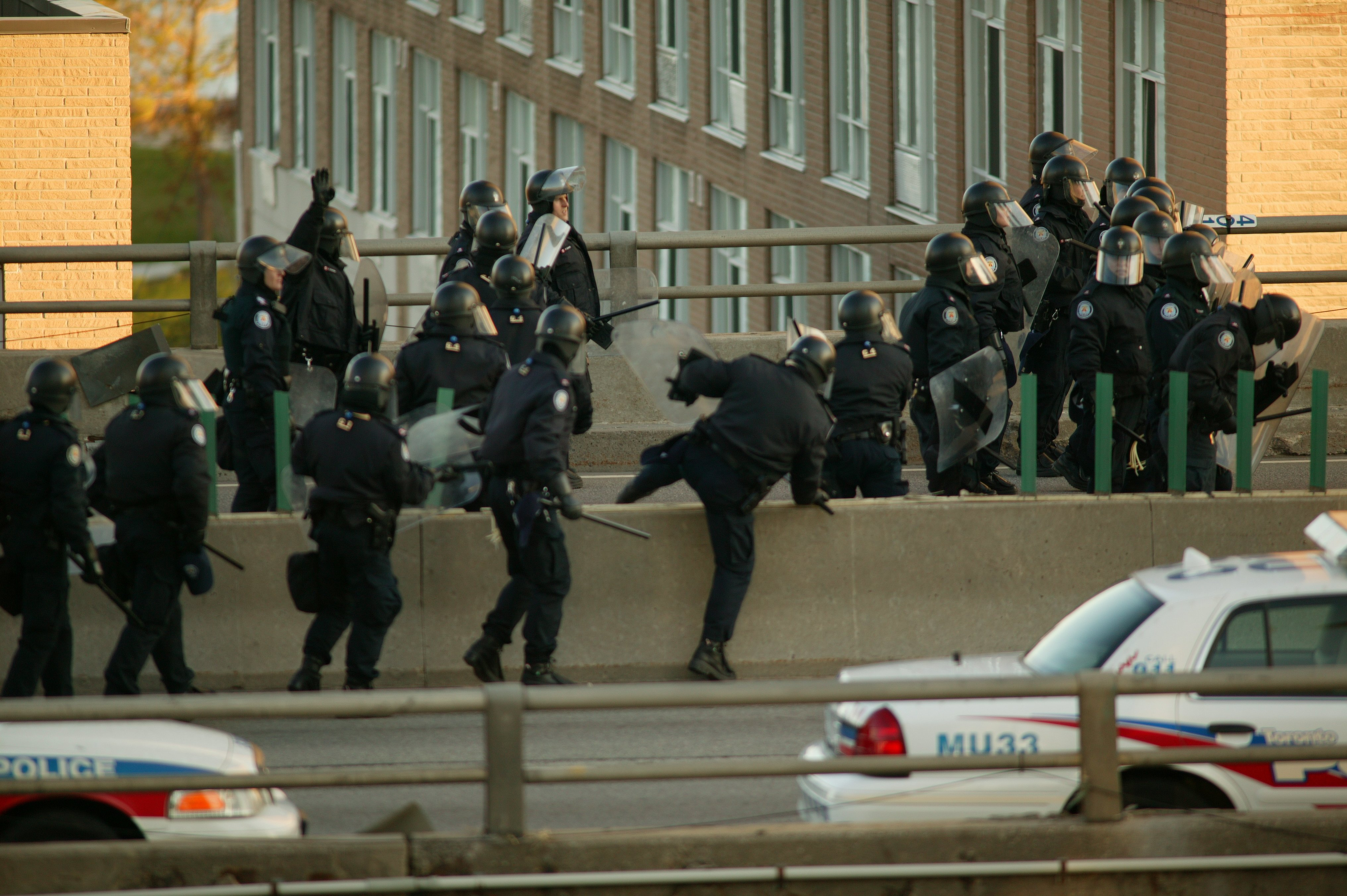
Police officers prepare to confront protesters on the Gardiner Expressway

During the non-stop protests in Ottawa, Lawrence Cannon requested the Government of Sri Lanka for an immediate ceasefire. He also rejected calls from the High Commissioner of Sri Lanka in Canada to stop all protests in Ottawa. Cannon condemned the LTTE for preventing civilians from leaving areas being attacked and using them as human shields. Bev Oda and the Conservative Party of Canada both condemned the use of LTTE flags, insisting that they symbolize connection with a terrorist organization. David Miller and Ontario Premier Dalton McGuinty also condemned the Gardiner Expressway blockade. Liberal Party of Canada leader Michael Ignatieff had made statements on the protests in a few occasions. Ignatieff urged the Harper government to break its silence and take initiative in condemning the violence. He stated that there are no military solutions to the conflict and that the war must stop under a worldwide initiative and internationally coordinated diplomatic strategy. On 21 April, Ignatieff met with a few Tamil leaders in Ottawa to discuss the humanitarian crisis. On the occasion, he said the following:

I am deeply concerned about escalating violence in Sri Lanka, and the resulting deaths of thousands of civilians. It was important for me to hear from Tamil Canadians, whose family and friends in Sri Lanka are suffering first hand from this crisis. We cannot sit back and watch as thousands of innocent lives are lost in the cross-fire, and we condemn any attempt to use civilians as human shields.

On 13 May in Washington, D.C., Barack Obama condemned the civil war in Sri Lanka and the army's continuous shelling of safe-zones and shelters. He also condemned the use of civilians as human shields by the LTTE. Obama insisted that the civil war, which became a humanitarian crisis, could result in a "full-blown catastrophe." According to him, "the United States is ready to work towards ending the conflict."

On 9 June, Bob Rae was denied entry into Sri Lanka by Sri Lankan immigration officials at Bandaranaike International Airport in Colombo. Although reasons for rejection were generally found unclear, the Government of Sri Lanka cited Rae was "a threat to national security and sympathetic to the Tamil Tigers rebel group". On the issue, Rae stated: "Sri Lanka is afraid of dialogue, afraid of discussion, afraid of engagement. If this is how they treat me, imagine how they treat people who can't speak out." Rae described Sri Lanka as "a very dangerous place to be a journalist" and that it is "a very dangerous place to be any kind of Tamil right now". The news sparked controversy for both Rae and Sri Lanka in Canada and made it to the headlines of newspapers in other countries.

=== Public reception and criticism ===
The protests have drawn criticism from some observers of the Sri Lankan Civil War. In an opinion piece titled "Misguided Tamil protesters" published by the National Post, Martin Collacott, a former High Commissioner of Canada to Sri Lanka, questioned the objectives of the protesters. In the editorial, he insisted that if the primary concern of the protesters was the safety of Tamil civilians, they would have asked the LTTE to free those trapped in the war zone instead of using them as human shields. However, by asking for a ceasefire, he said, the protesters want to "bring about a situation that would allow the Tigers to preserve their fighting capability and prolong the insurgency." The article goes on to question why children who were born in Canada to native Sri Lankan parents were brought out to protests among others who were waving the flag of an organisation Canada has labelled a terrorist organization.

== See also ==
- Tamils Against Genocide
