= Gage Park =

Gage Park may refer to:

- Gage Park, Topeka, Kansas, U.S.A, a city park
- Gage Park, Chicago, Illinois, U.S.A, a community area
- Gage Park, Brampton, Ontario, Canada, a city park
- Gage Park, Hamilton, Ontario, Canada, a historic city park
