= Brampton =

City in Ontario, Canada

- City (lower-tier)
- City of Brampton
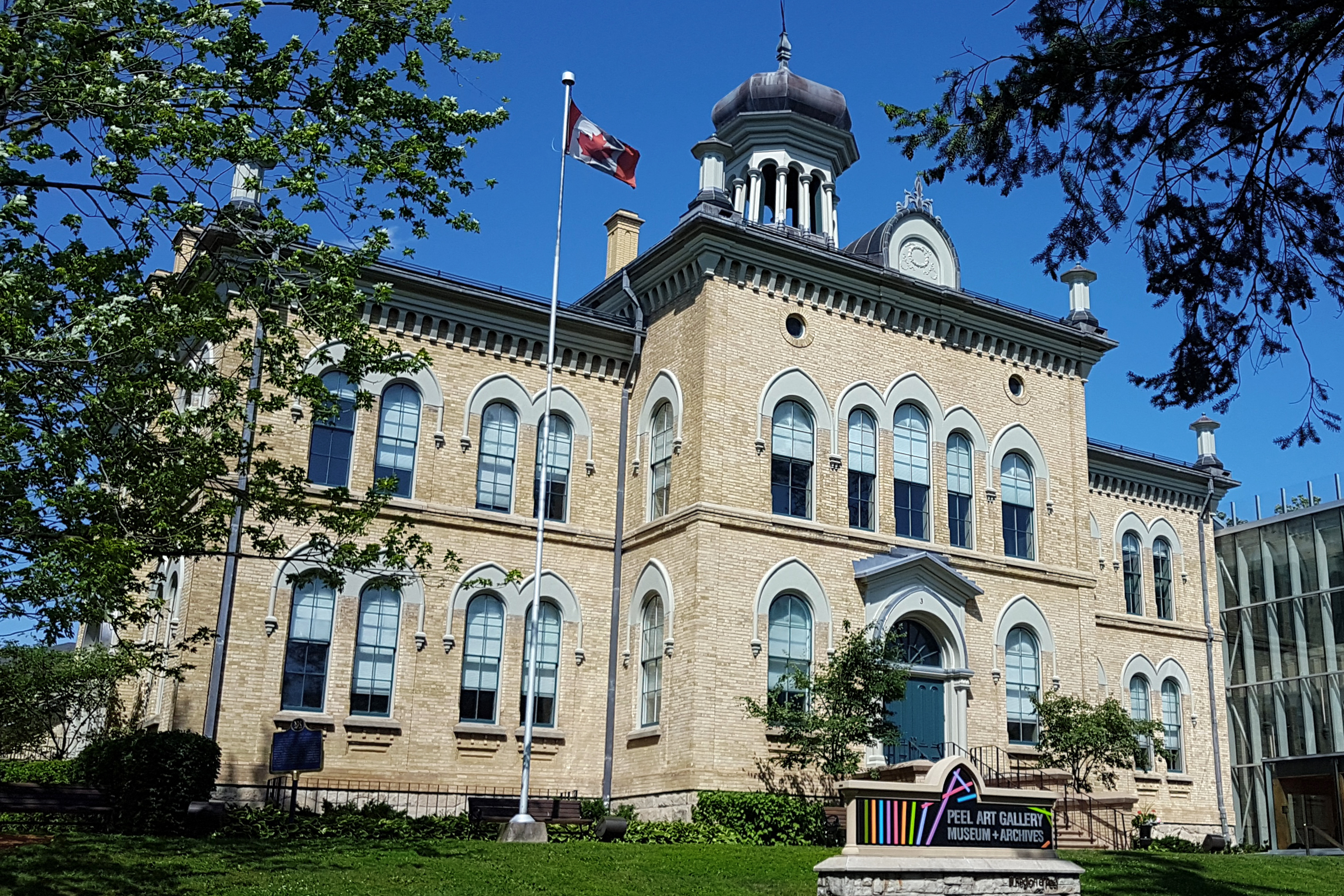
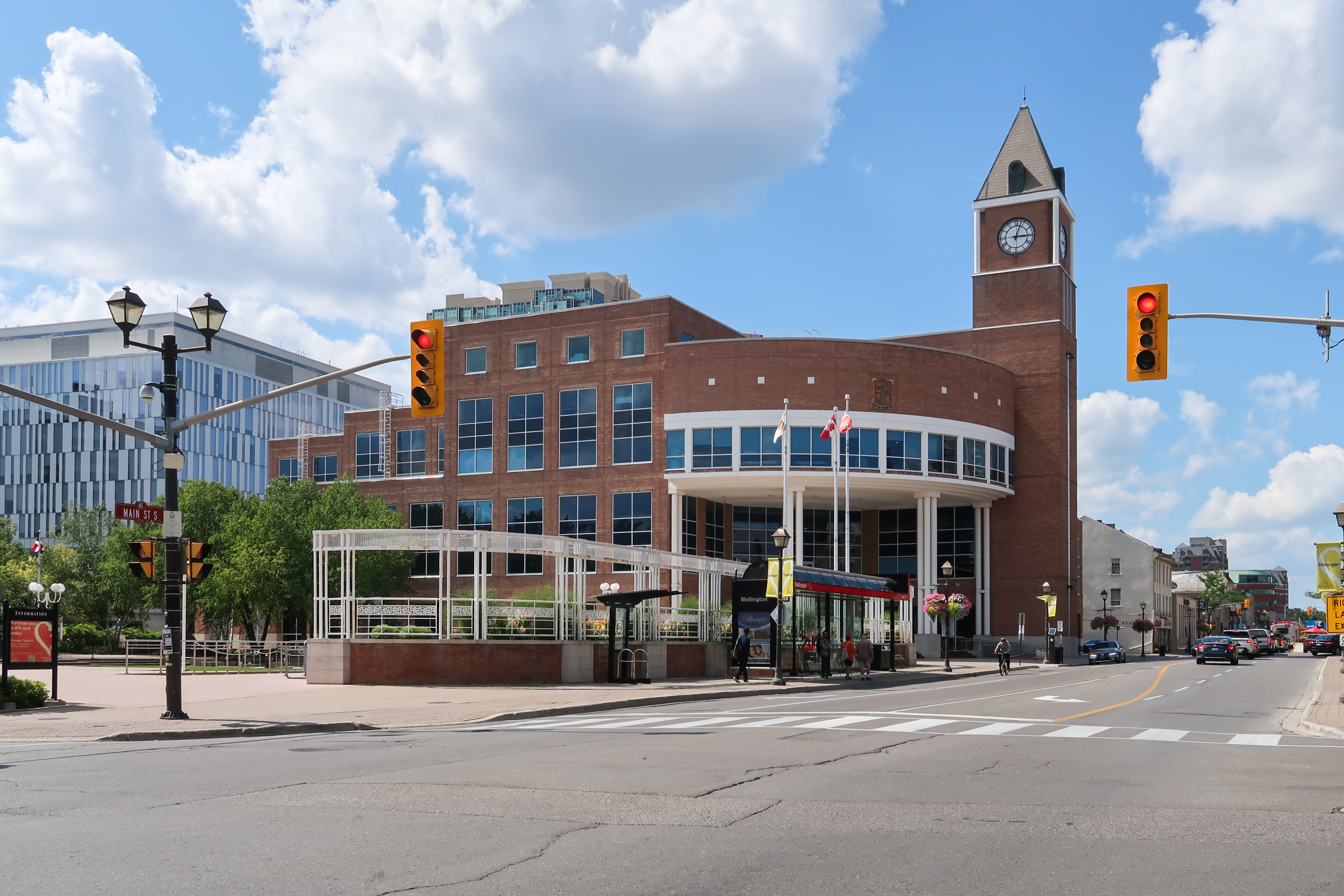
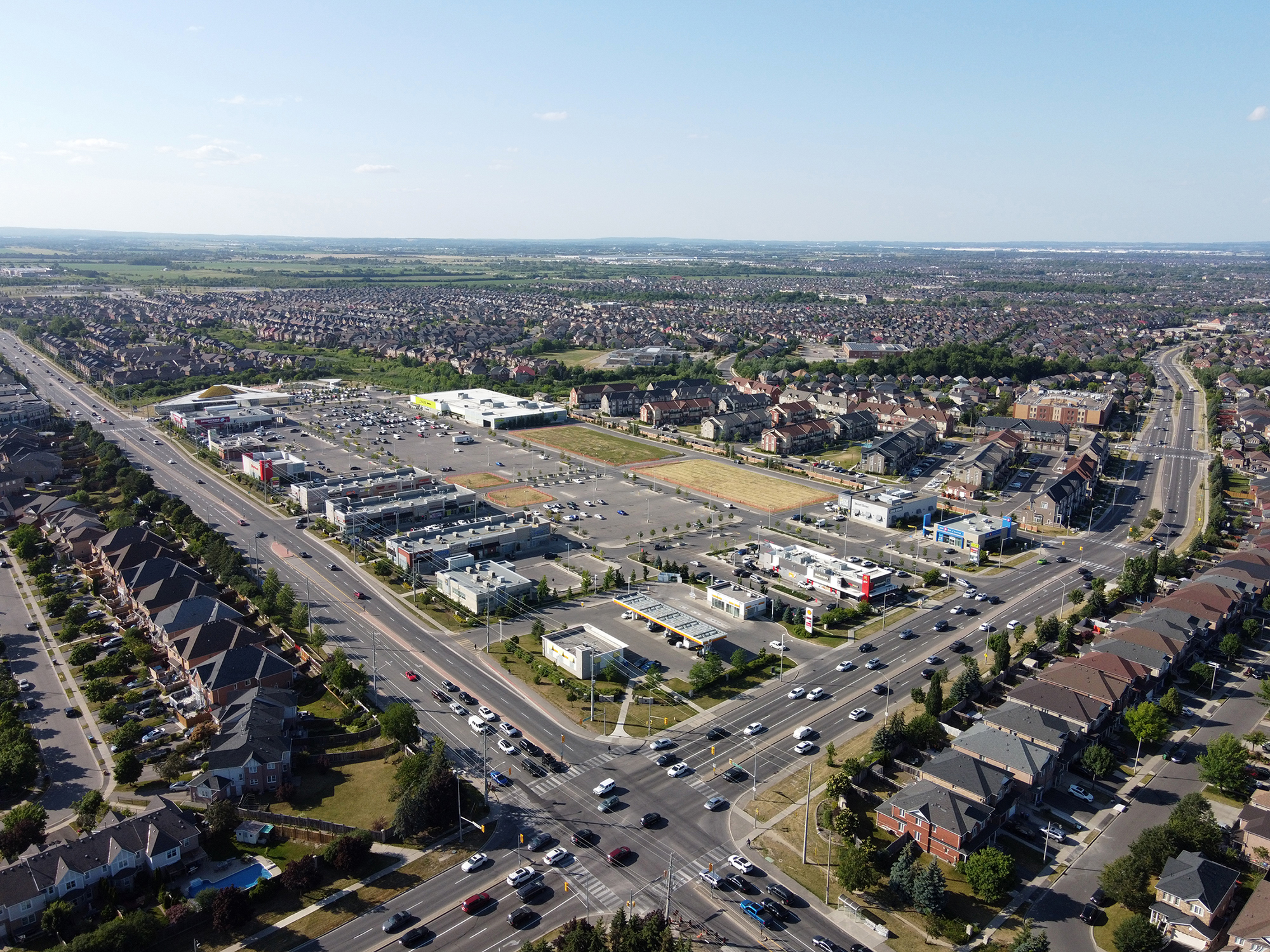
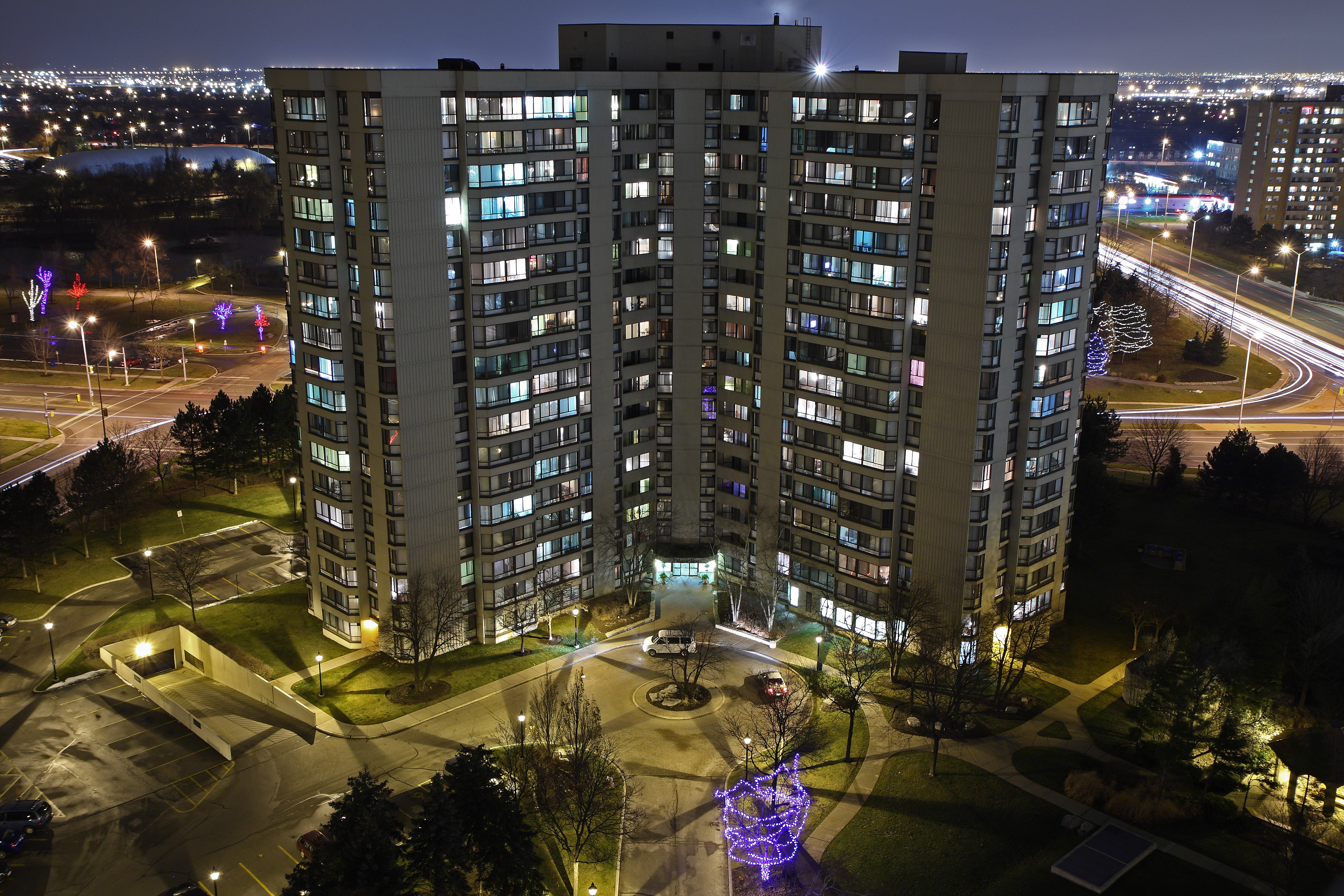
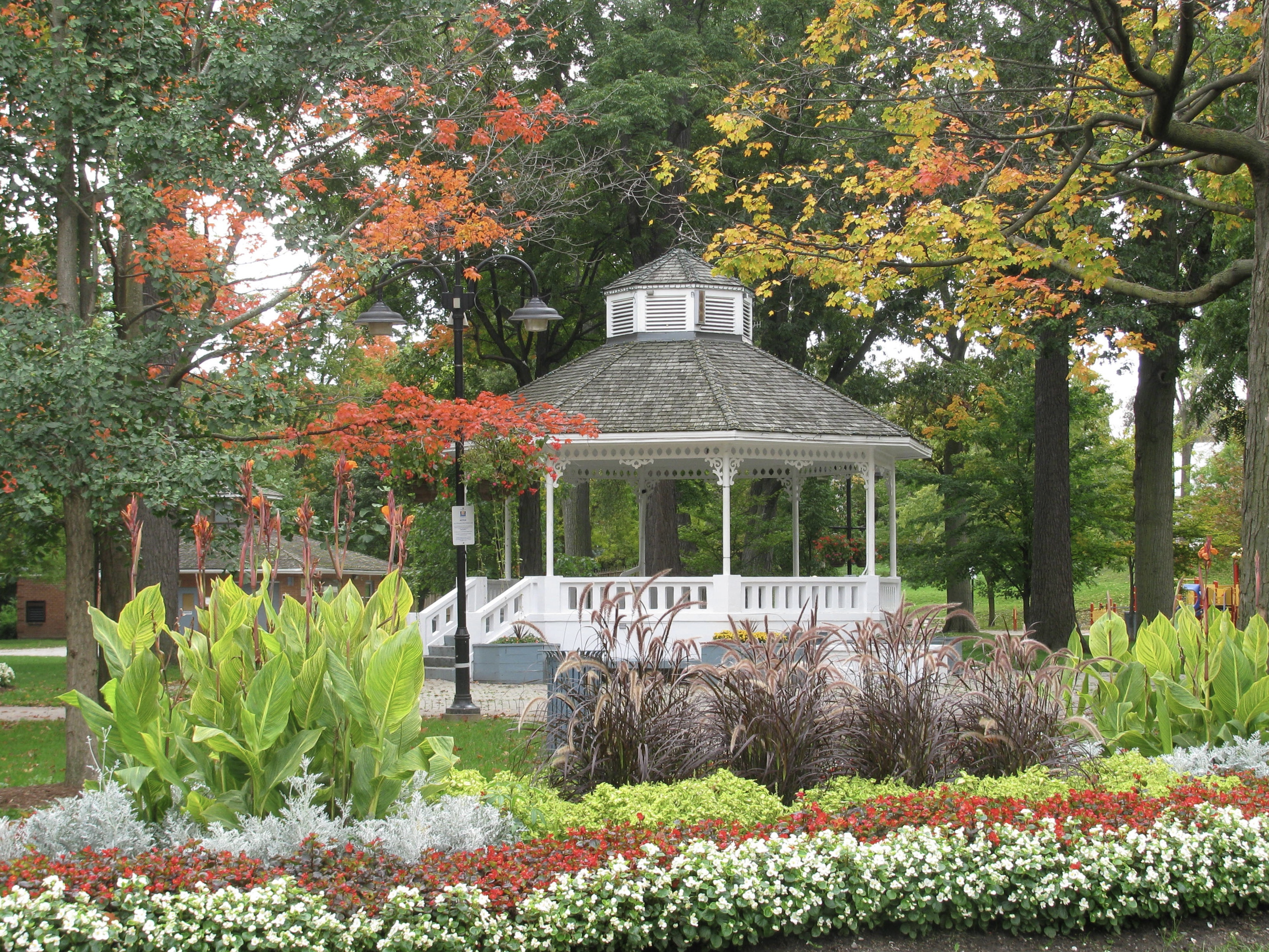
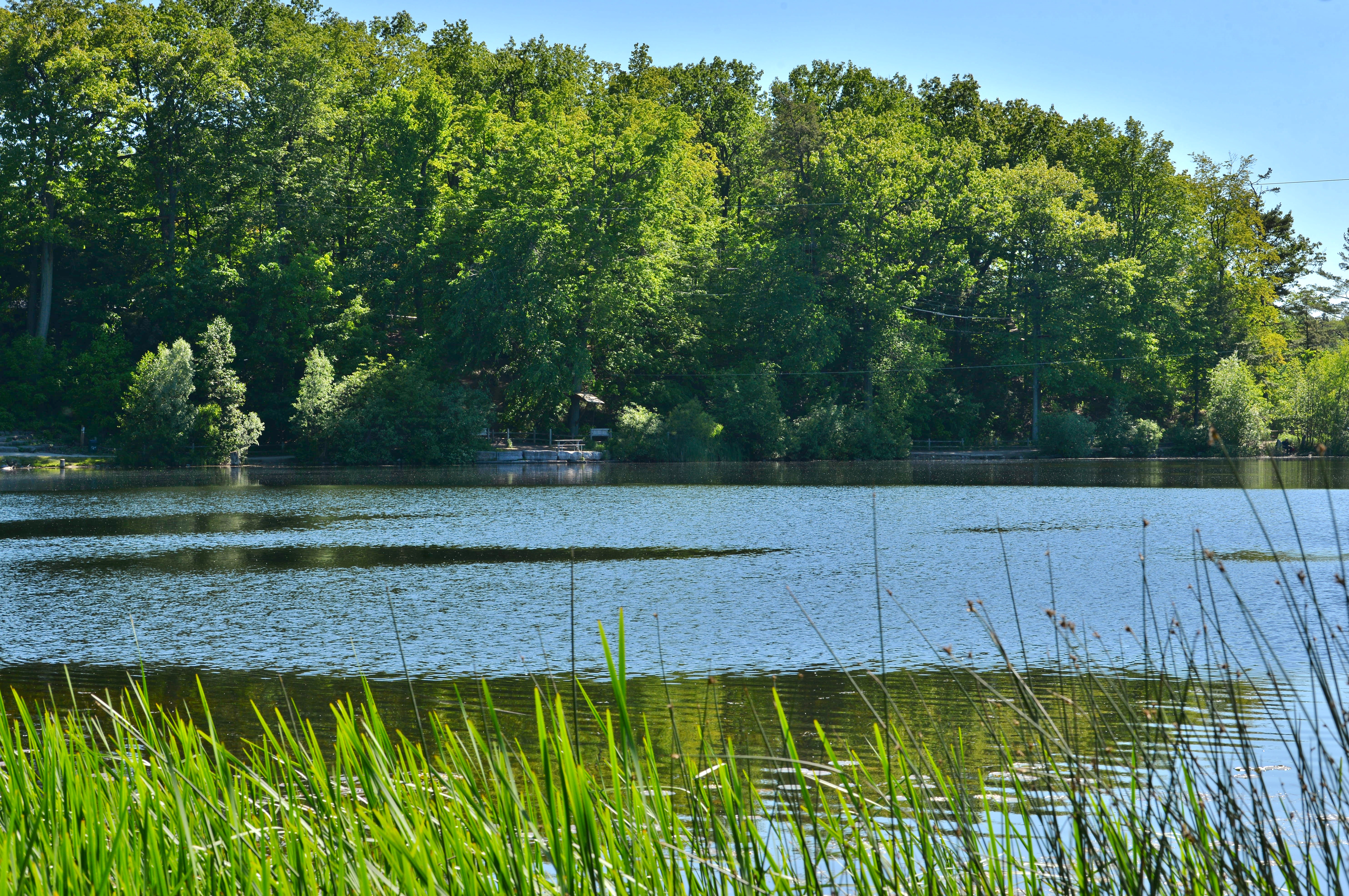
- Peel Art Gallery, Museum and Archives and former courthouse Brampton City Hall along Main Street Suburban division of Springdale Apartments in Bramalea Gage Park Heart Lake Conservation Area The Brampton Dominion building

- Flag Logo
- Nickname: Flower City (previously Flower Town)
- Interactive map of Brampton
- Location within Southern Ontario Location within Regional Municipality of Peel
- Coordinates: 43°41′18″N 79°45′39″W
- Country: Canada
- Province: Ontario
- Region: Peel
- Incorporation: 1853 (village)
- 1873 (town)
- 1974 (city)

Government
  - Mayor: Patrick Brown
  - Governing Body: Brampton City Council
  - Federal representation: List of MPs: Maninder Sidhu (Liberal); Amarjeet Gill (Conservative); Ruby Sahota (Liberal); Shafqat Ali (Liberal); Sonia Sidhu (Liberal); Amandeep Sodhi (Liberal)
  - Provincial representation: List of MPPs: Amarjot Sandhu (PC); Prabmeet Sarkaria (PC); Hardeep Grewal (PC); Charmaine Williams (PC); Graham McGregor (PC)

Area (2021)
  - Land: 265.89 km^{2} (102.66 sq mi)
- Elevation: 218 m (715 ft)

Population (2021)
  - Total: 656,480 (9th)
  - Density: 2,469/km^{2} (6,390/sq mi)
- Demonym: Bramptonian
- Time zone: UTC−05:00 (EST)
  - Summer (DST): UTC−04:00 (EDT)
- Forward sortation area: L6P to L7A
- Area codes: 905, 289, 365, and 742
- Website: www.brampton.ca

Brampton is the ninth most populous municipality in Canada and the regional seat of the Regional Municipality of Peel. It is also the third most populous city in the Greater Golden Horseshoe urban area, behind Toronto and Mississauga. Brampton is part of the Greater Toronto Area (GTA), located in the Canadian province of Ontario, and is a lower-tier municipality within the Peel Region. The City of Brampton is bordered by Vaughan to the east, Halton Hills to the west, Caledon to the north, Mississauga to the south, and Etobicoke (Toronto) to the southeast.

Named after the town of Brampton in Cumberland, England, Brampton was incorporated as a village in 1853 and as a town in 1873, and became a city in 1974. The modern City of Brampton was formed following an amalgamation of several surrounding townships and communities.

The city was once known as "The Flower Town of Canada", a title referring to its abundance of greenhouses and strong floriculture industry in the 1860s. It maintains the term "Flower City" as its slogan.

Despite being built as a car-centric city, Brampton has a significant transit system, with a ridership of 49,200,800, or about 226,500 per weekday as of the second quarter of 2024.

== History ==
=== Early history ===
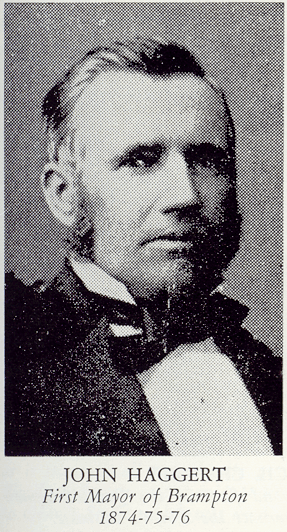
John Haggert, Brampton's first mayor

Before the arrival of British settlers, the Mississaugas of the Credit First Nation held 648,000 acres (262,000 ha) of the land north to the head of the Lake Purchase lands and extending to the unceded territory of the Chippewa of Lakes Huron and Simcoe. European settlers began to arrive in the area in the late 18th century. In October 1818, the chief of the Mississaugas of the Credit First Nation signed Treaty 19, also known as the Ajetance Purchase, surrendering the area to the British Crown.

Prior to the 1830s, most business in Chinguacousy Township took place at Martin Salisbury's tavern. One mile from the corner of Hurontario Street and the 5th Sideroad (now Main and Queen Streets in the centre of Brampton), William Buffy's tavern was the only significant building. At the time, the intersection was referred to as "Buffy's Corners". By 1834, John Elliott laid out the area in lots for sale, calling it "Brampton", which was soon adopted by others.

In 1853, a small agricultural fair was set up by the newly initiated County Agricultural Society of the County of Peel and was held at the corner of Main and Queen streets. Grains, produce, roots, and dairy products were up for sale. Horses and cattle, along with other lesser livestock, were also sold at the market. This agricultural fair eventually became the modern Brampton Fall Fair.

In that same year, Brampton was incorporated as a village. In 1866, the town became the county seat and the location of the Peel County Courthouse which was built in 1865–66; a three-storey County jail was added at the rear in 1867.

Edward Dale, an immigrant from Dorking, England, established a flower nursery in Brampton shortly after his arrival in 1863. Dale's Nursery had become the town's largest and most prominent employer, developed a flower grading system, and established a global export market for its products. The company chimney was a town landmark, until Brampton Town Council allowed it to be torn down in 1977. At its height, the company had 140 greenhouses, and was the largest cut flower business in North America, producing 20 million blooms and introducing numerous rose and orchid cultivar to the market. It also spurred the development of other nurseries in the town. Forty-eight hothouse flower nurseries once did business in the town.

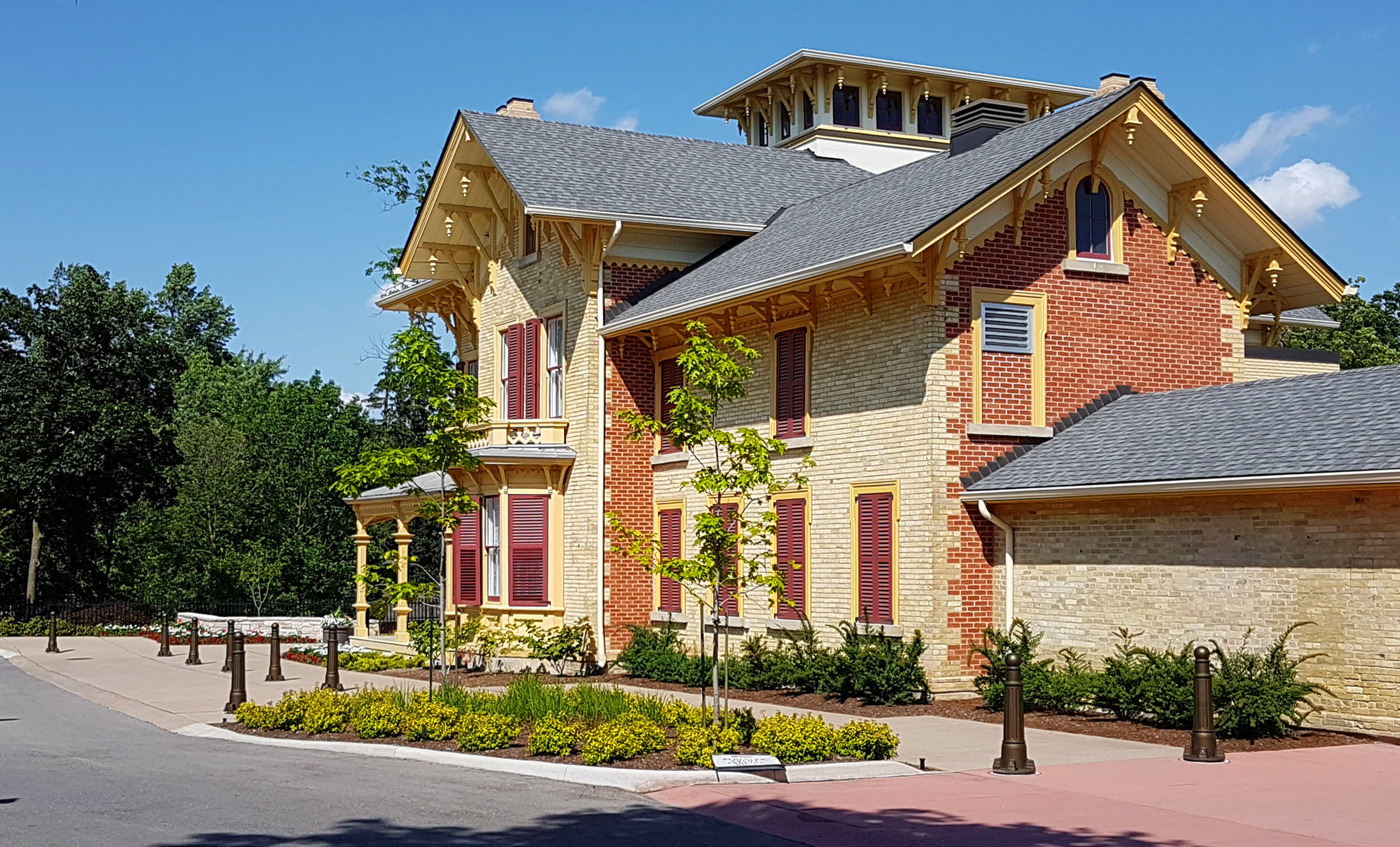
The Alderlea Estate, built c. 1867–1870 for Canadian businessman Kenneth Chisholm

In January 1867, Peel County separated from the County of York, a union which had existed since 1851. By 1869, Brampton had a population of 1,800. It was incorporated as a town in 1873.

The town of Brampton had problems with inadequate water supply in its early years, as the town relied on shallow wells for not just residential water, but commercial use and fire-fighting. In 1878, government-appointed water commissioners identified Snell's Lake (the present-day Heart Lake, named after the property owner at the time) nearly 5 kilometers (3 mi) north of town as a good source for the city's water supply, and worked with property owners to build a pipeline from Heart Lake to town, supplying Brampton with water. A Brampton Water Works filtration plant was built south of the lake, located where present-day White Spruce Park is. Today the city uses water from other sources, and Heart Lake is now the centrepiece of Heart Lake Conservation Area.

A federal grant had enabled the village to found its first public library in 1887, which included 360 volumes from the Mechanic's Institute (established in 1858). In 1907, the library received a grant from the Carnegie Foundation, set up by United States steel magnate and philanthropist Andrew Carnegie, to build a new, expanded library; it serves several purposes, featuring the Brampton Library. The Carnegie libraries were built on the basis of communities coming up with matching funds and guaranteeing maintenance.

In 1902, Sir William J. Gage (owner of Gage Publishing, a publishing house specializing in school textbooks) purchased a 3.25-acre (1.32 ha) portion of the gardens and lawns of the Alder Lea estate (now called Alderlea) that had been built on Main Street by Kenneth Chisholm in 1867 to 1870. (Chisholm, a merchant and founding father of Brampton, had been the Town reeve, then warden of Peel County, then MPP for Brampton and eventually, Registrar of Peel County.) Gage donated 1.7 acres (0.69 ha) of the property to the town, with a specific condition that it be made into a park. Citizens donated $1,054 and the town used the funds to purchase extra land to ensure a larger park.

A group of regional farmers in Brampton had trouble getting insurance from city-based companies. After several meetings in Clairville Hall, they decided to found the County of Peel Farmers Mutual Fire Insurance Company. In 1955, when the company moved to its third and current location, 103 Queen Street West, it took the new name of Peel Mutual Insurance Company. It reigns as the longest-running company in modern Brampton. Harmsworth Decorating Centre was established in 1890, as Harmsworth and Son, operated out of the family's house on Queen Street West. The current location was purchased on September 1, 1904, after a fire destroyed their original store. Purchased for $1,400, the 24 Main Street South location is the longest-operating retail business in what is now Brampton.

In 1963, the town established the Flower Festival of Brampton, which was based on the Rose Festival in Portland, Oregon, United States. It began to market itself as the "Flower Town of Canada".

In 1974, the two townships of Chinguacousy and Toronto Gore were incorporated into Brampton. The small pine added to the centre of the shield on the Brampton city flag represents Chinguacousy, honouring the Chippewa chief Shinguacose, "The Small Pine." After this merger, outlying communities such as Bramalea, Heart Lake and Professor's Lake, Snelgrove, Tullamore, and Marysfield, were incorporated into the City, and in some instances further developed.

In a revival of this theme, on June 24, 2002, the City Council established the "Flower City Strategy", to promote a connection to its flower-growing heritage. The intention was to inspire design projects and community landscaping to beautify the city, adopt a sustainable environmental approach, and to protect its natural and cultural heritage. The Rose Theatre was named in keeping with this vision and is to serve as a cultural institution in the city. In addition, the city participates in the national Communities in Bloom competition as part of that strategy.

The Old Shoe Factory, located at 57 Mill Street North, once housed the Hewetson Shoe Company. It was listed as a historical property under the Ontario Heritage Act in 2008. Today it is occupied by various small businesses. The lobby and hallways retain details from 1907. Walls are decorated with pictures and artifacts of local Brampton history and old shoemaking equipment.

A self-guided historical walking tour of downtown Brampton called "A Walk Through Time" is available at Brampton City Hall and online at no cost.

=== Development of Bramalea ===
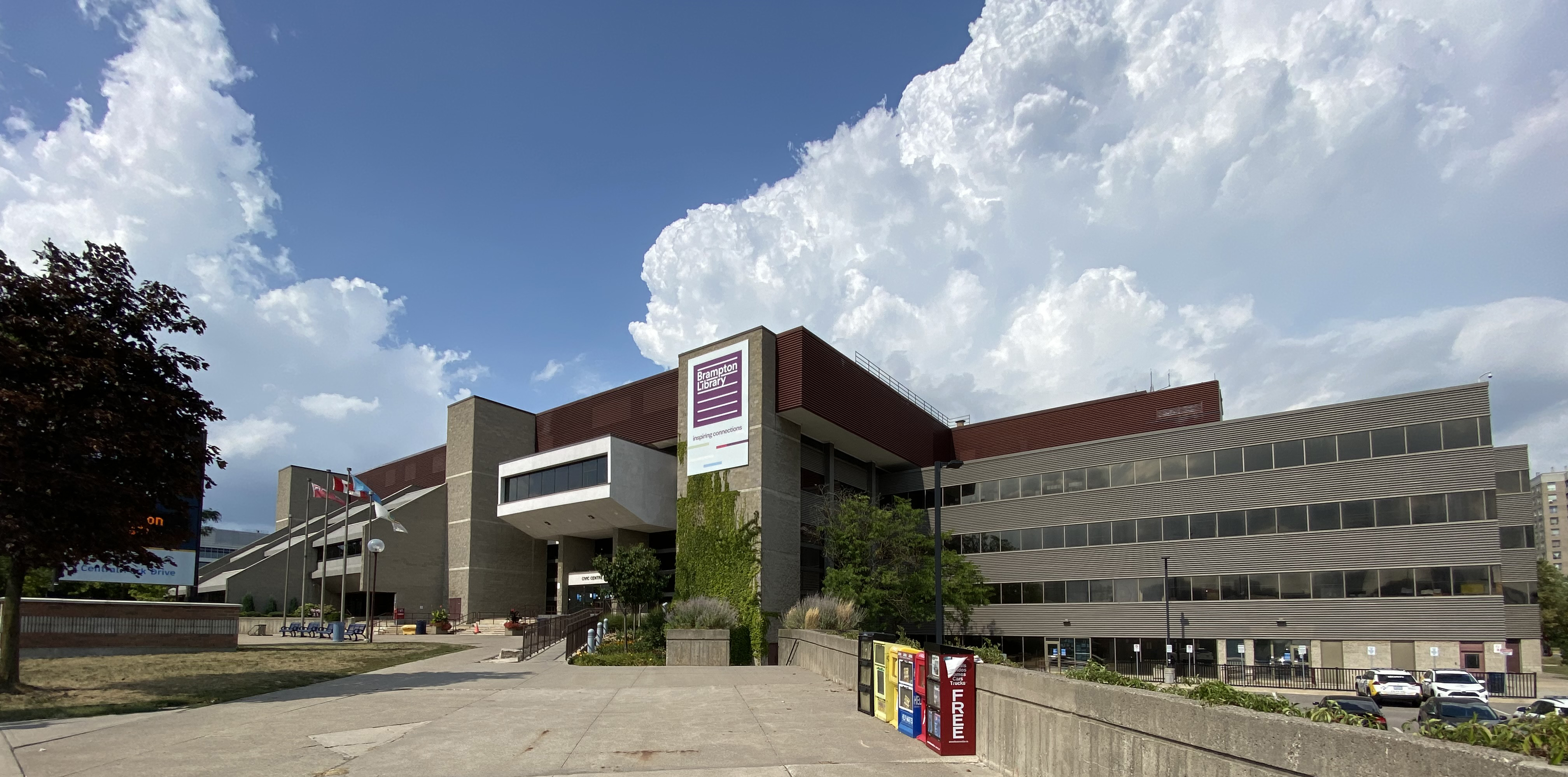
Bramalea Civic Centre building, originally the home of the Chinguacousy Township offices, also housed several municipal services, including a public library, until 2023, when they moved to make way for a medical school, which opened in 2025.

Planned as an innovative "new town", Bramalea was developed in the 1950s immediately east of the Town of Brampton in Chinguacousy Township. It was Canada's first satellite community developed by one of the country's largest real estate developers, Bramalea Limited. The name "Bramalea" was created by the farmer William Sheard, who combined "BRAM" from Brampton, "MAL" from Malton (then a neighbouring town which is now part of the city of Mississauga), and "LEA", an Old English word meaning meadow or grassland. He sold the land to Brampton Leasing (the former name of the developer) and built one of Bramalea's first houses on Dixie Road.

The community was developed according to its detailed master plan, which included provisions for a parkland trail system and a "downtown" to include essential services and a shopping centre. The downtown's centrepiece was the Civic Centre, built in 1972 to include the city hall and library. Directly across Team Canada Drive, a shopping centre, Bramalea City Centre was built. These developments were connected by a long tunnel, planned to provide protection from winter weather. The tunnel has long since been closed due to safety issues.

=== Region of Peel ===
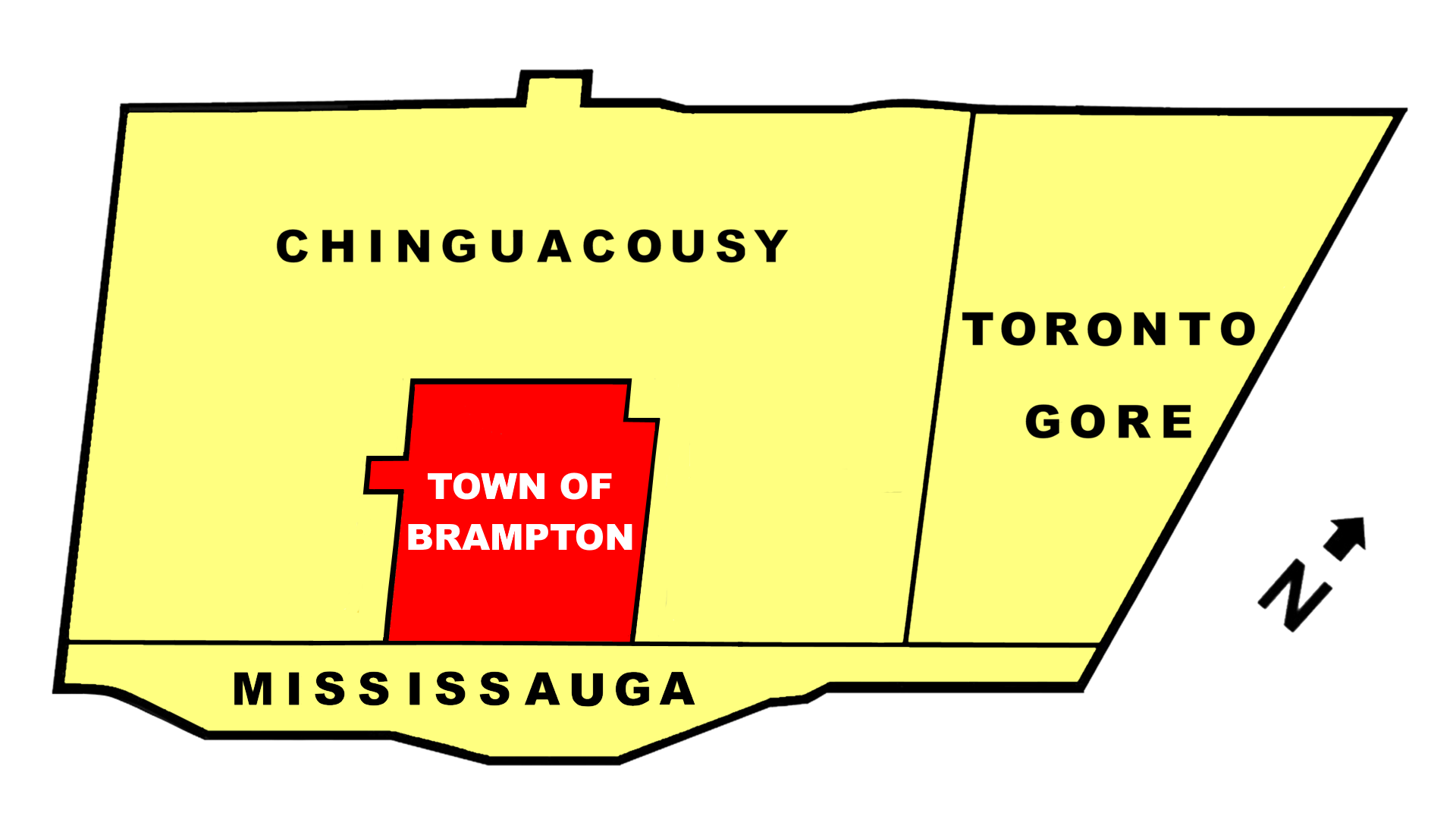
The areas of adjacent municipalities (yellow) amalgamated with the Town of Brampton (red) in 1974 to create the present city.

In 1974, the Ontario provincial government decided to update Peel County's structure. It amalgamated several towns and villages into the new City of Mississauga. In addition, it created the present City of Brampton from the town and the greater portion of the Townships of Chinguacousy and Toronto Gore, and the northern extremity of Mississauga south of Steeles Avenue, including Bramalea and the other communities such as Churchville, Claireville, Ebenezer, Victoria, Springbrook, Coleraine, and Huttonville. While only Huttonville and Churchville still exist as identifiable communities, other names like Claireville are re-emerging as names of new developments.

The province converted Peel County into the Regional Municipality of Peel. Brampton retained its role as the administrative centre of Peel Region, which it already had as county seat. The regional council chamber, the Peel Regional Police force, the public health department, and the region's only major museum, the Peel Art Gallery, Museum and Archives, are all located in Brampton.

This change had its critics among those with a strong sense of local identities. Bramptonians feared urban sprawl would dissolve their town's personality. Bramalea residents took pride in the built-from-scratch and organised structure that had come with their new satellite city and did not want to give it up. Others in Bramalea accept they are part of Brampton, and they make up a "tri-city" area: the original Brampton, Heart Lake, Bramalea.

In 1972, Chinguacousy built a new civic centre in Bramalea. Two years later, when Brampton and Chinguacousy merged, the new city's council was moved from its modest downtown Brampton locale to the Bramalea building. The library systems of Brampton and Chinguacousy were merged, resulting in a system of four locations.

Some have questioned the future of Peel Region as encompassing all of Brampton, Mississauga, and Caledon. The Mississauga council, led by Mayor Hazel McCallion, voted to become a single-tier municipality and asked the provincial government to be separated from Peel Region. They argued the city has outgrown the need for a regional layer of government, and that Mississauga is being held back by supporting Brampton and Caledon with its municipal taxes.

=== Development as a city ===
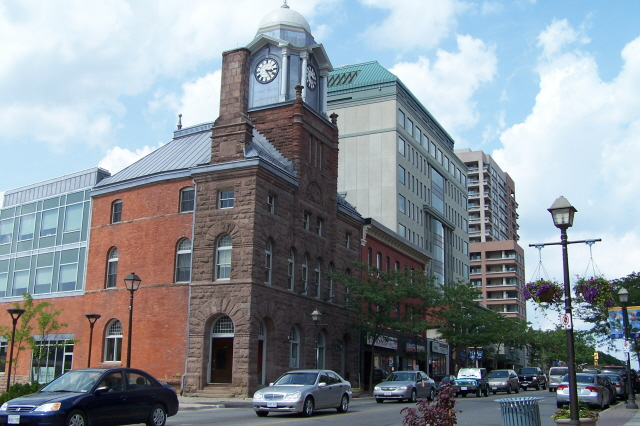
The Brampton Dominion Building

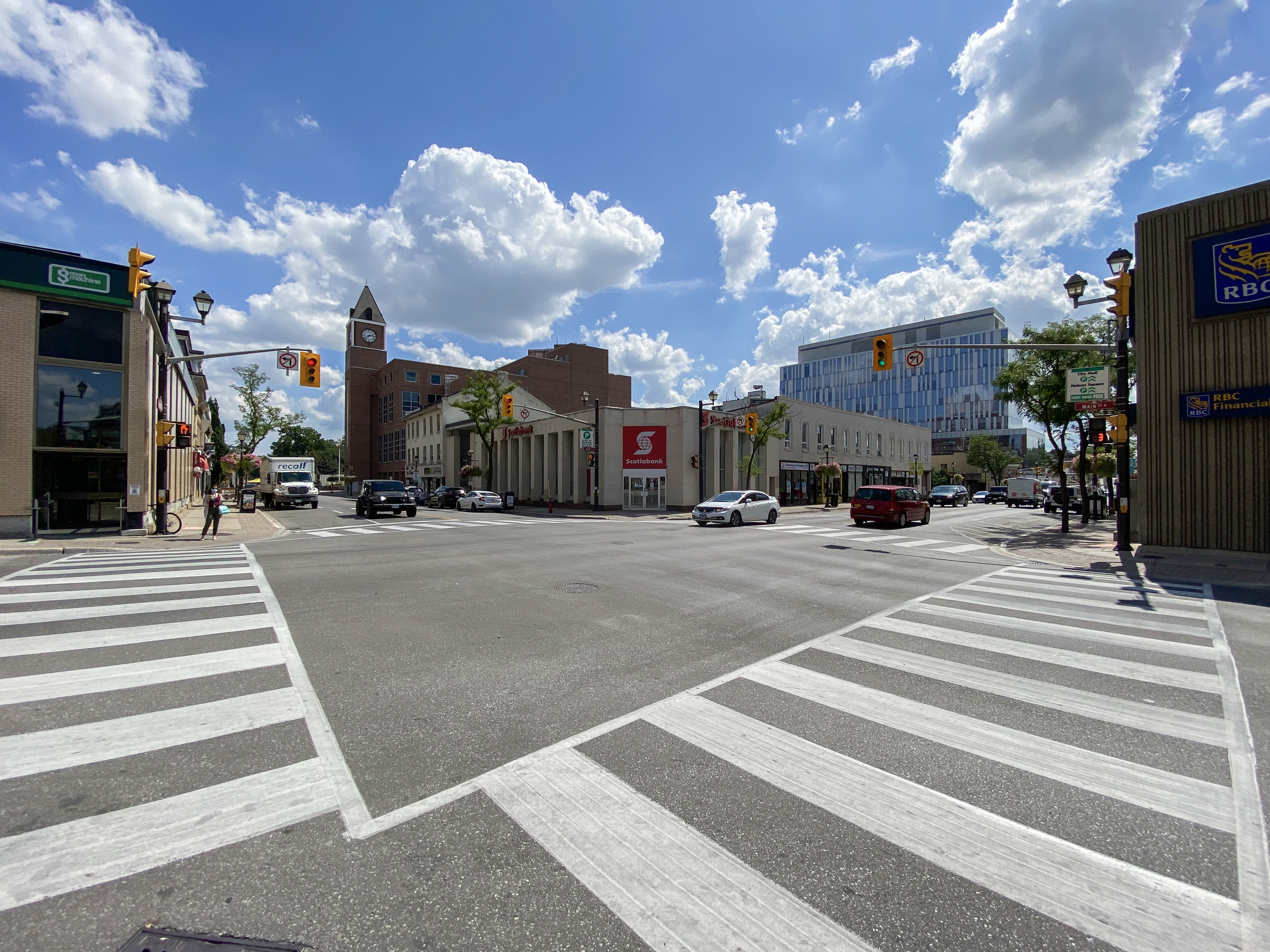
The intersection of Main and Queen streets downtown, known as the "Four Corners"

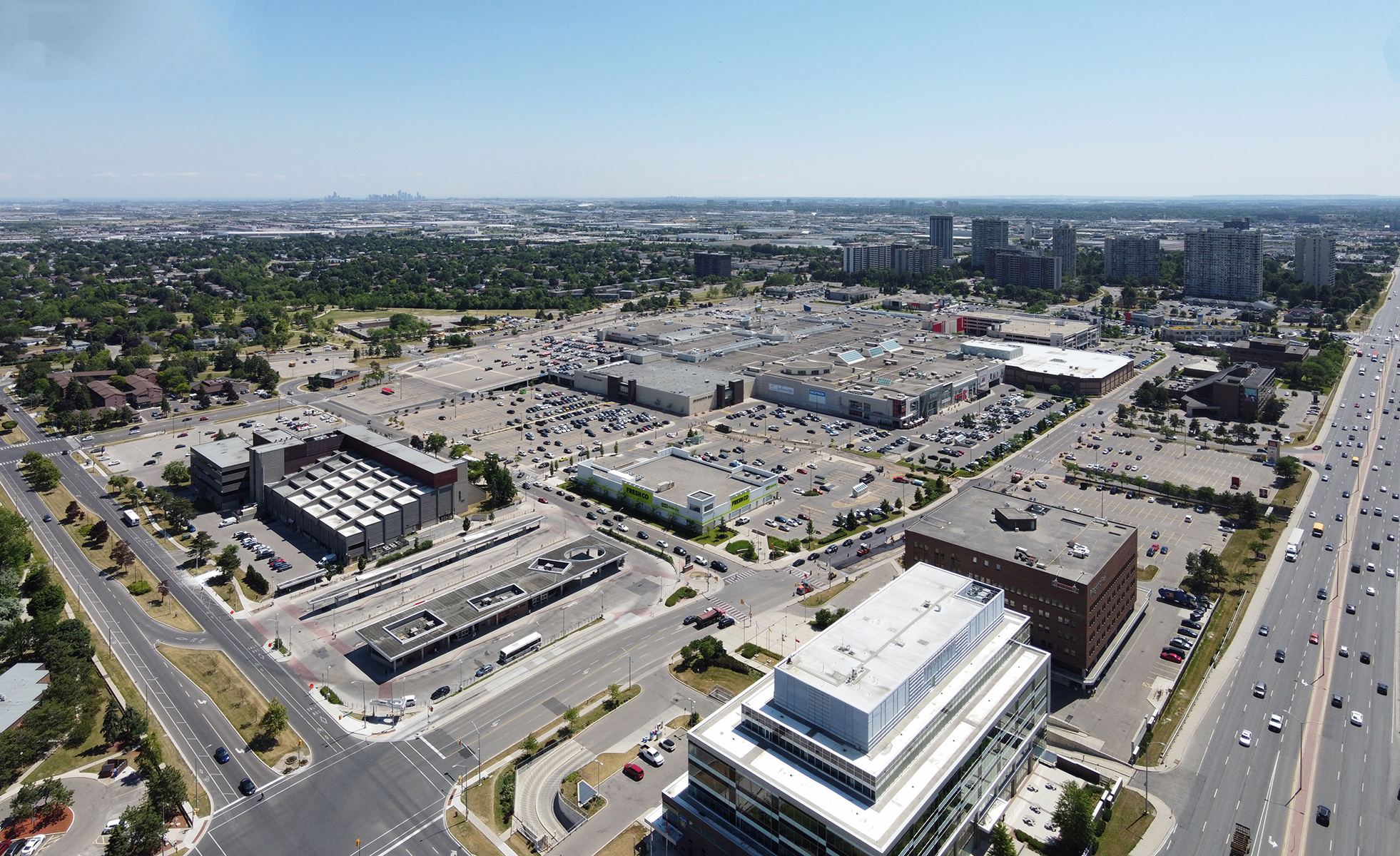
Bramalea City Centre in Bramalea

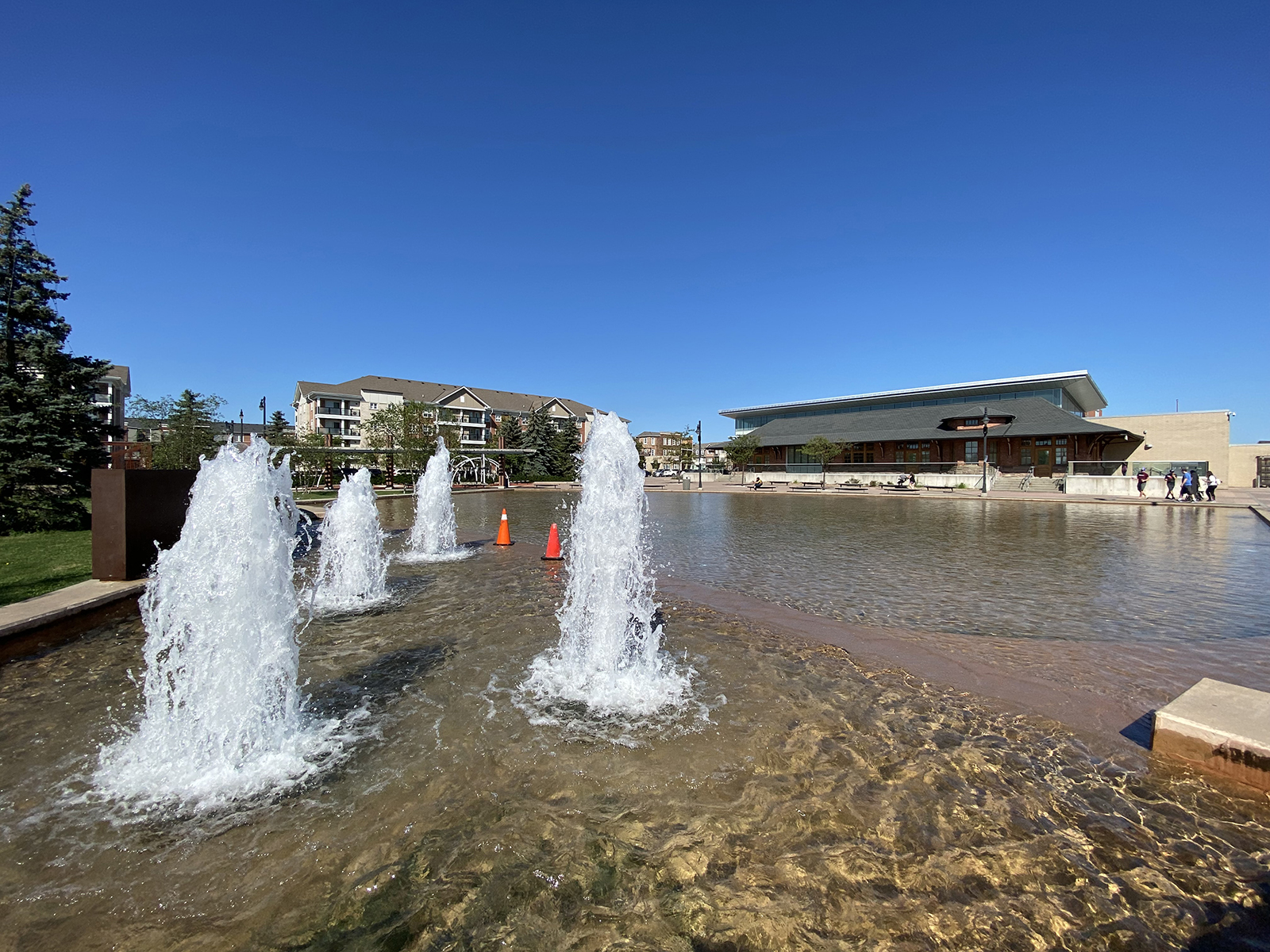
Mount Pleasant Village Square

In the early 1980s, Cineplex Odeon closed the Capitol Theatre in Brampton. The City bought the facility in 1981 under the leadership of councillor Diane Sutter. It adapted the former vaudeville venue and movie house as a performing arts theatre, to be used also as a live music venue. It was renamed the Heritage Theatre. Renovations and maintenance were expensive. In 1983, Toronto consultants Woods Gordon reported to the City that, rather than continue "pouring money" into the Heritage, they should construct a new 750-seat facility with up-to-date features. This recommendation was adopted, and the city designated the 2005–06 season as the Heritage Theatre's "grand finale" season. The city funded construction of the new Rose Theatre, which opened in September 2006.

Carabram was founded in 1982, the result of volunteers from different ethnic communities wanting to organize a festival celebrating diversity and cross-cultural friendship. The name was loosely related to Toronto's Caravan Festival of Cultures. Carabram's first event featured Italian, Scots, Ukrainian, and West Indian pavilions. By 2003, the fair had 18 pavilions attracting 45,000 visitors.

Brampton has grown to become one of the most diverse cities in Canada. In 1996, the city was 13% South Asian and 8.2% black. By 2016, the South Asian community grew significantly to represent 44.3% of the city's population, while the black population grew to 14%. Responding to a growing multi-cultural population, the Peel Board of Education introduced evening English as a Second Language (ESL) classes at high schools. Originally taught by volunteers, the classes eventually were scheduled as daytime courses taught by paid instructors. In the 1980s, the public and Catholic board expanded its language programs, offering night classes in 23 languages. These were introduced due to requests by parents, who wanted their children to learn their ancestral languages and heritage.

In the late 1980s, Mayor Ken Whillans gained approval and funding for the construction of a new city hall in Brampton's downtown. The facility was designed by local architects and built on the site of a former bus terminal. Whillians did not get to see the opening of the new hall in June 1991 because of his death in August 1990. Its completion brought the municipal government back to downtown Brampton. The facility expanded in 2014 with the addition of a nine-storey tower at 41 George Street and is connected to the original building by a glass walkway called Heritage Way.

In 1991, development of another new town, Springdale, began. In 1999, development started to appear as far north as the city's border with Caledon along Mayfield Road. The Region designated this border as the line of demarcation for urban development until 2021, although development already began spilling north of Mayfield in the late 2010s. Part of the boundary between Brampton and Vaughan is also nearly completely urbanized.

Changes continue to reflect the growth of the city. In 1992 the City purchased the Brampton Fairgrounds, to be used for other development. The Agricultural Society relocated in 1997 outside the boundaries of the city to Heart Lake and Old School roads.

Brampton's 2003 Sesquicentennial celebrations boosted community spirit, reviving the tradition of a summer parade (with 100 floats), and creating other initiatives. To commemorate the town's history, the city under Mayor Fennell reintroduced floral projects to the community. These have included more plantings around town, the revival in 2005 of the city Parade, and participation in the Canada Communities in Bloom project.

== Cityscape ==
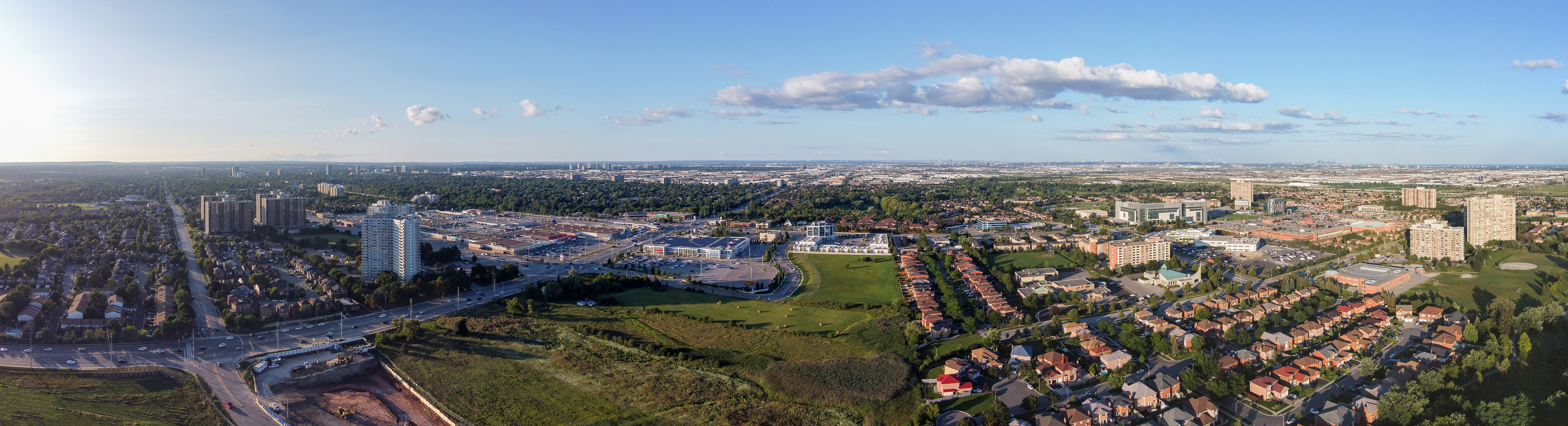
Aerial view of Brampton in 2021

== Geography and boundaries ==
Brampton has a total land area of 265 square kilometres (102 sq mi). The City of Brampton is bordered by Highway 50 (Vaughan) to the east, Winston Churchill Boulevard (Halton Hills) to the west, Mayfield Road (Caledon) to the north (except for a small neighbourhood, Snelgrove, which is part of Brampton despite extending slightly north of Mayfield Road), the hydro corridor (Mississauga) to the south as far east as Torbram Road, where the border between the two cities follows the CN Halton Subdivision. It follows the line as far east as the former Indian Line (today a private access road), turns back north along it to briefly border Toronto (Etobicoke), towards the intersection of Steeles Ave. and Albion Road/Highway 50.

=== Climate ===
Brampton features a continental climate (Köppen climate classification: Dfa) which is typical of the rest of the Greater Toronto Area.

Data from Toronto Pearson International Airport, located 10.55 km (6.56 mi) east.

Climate data for Lester B. Pearson International Airport (Brampton and North Mississauga) WMO ID: 71624; coordinates 43°40′38″N 79°37′50″W, elevation: 173.4 m (569 ft), 1991–2020 normals, extremes 1937–present
| Month | Jan | Feb | Mar | Apr | May | Jun | Jul | Aug | Sep | Oct | Nov | Dec | Year |
|---|---|---|---|---|---|---|---|---|---|---|---|---|---|
| Record high humidex | 19.0 | 18.3 | 29.6 | 37.9 | 42.6 | 45.6 | 50.3 | 46.6 | 48.0 | 39.1 | 28.6 | 23.9 | 50.3 |
| Record high °C (°F) | 17.6 (63.7) | 17.7 (63.9) | 26.0 (78.8) | 31.1 (88.0) | 34.4 (93.9) | 36.7 (98.1) | 37.9 (100.2) | 38.3 (100.9) | 36.7 (98.1) | 31.8 (89.2) | 25.1 (77.2) | 20.0 (68.0) | 38.3 (100.9) |
| Mean maximum °C (°F) | 10.0 (50.0) | 9.6 (49.3) | 16.9 (62.4) | 23.6 (74.5) | 29.3 (84.7) | 32.6 (90.7) | 33.1 (91.6) | 32.7 (90.9) | 31.1 (88.0) | 25.6 (78.1) | 17.8 (64.0) | 11.3 (52.3) | 34.5 (94.1) |
| Mean daily maximum °C (°F) | −1.2 (29.8) | −0.3 (31.5) | 5.0 (41.0) | 12.0 (53.6) | 19.2 (66.6) | 24.5 (76.1) | 27.4 (81.3) | 26.3 (79.3) | 22.3 (72.1) | 14.6 (58.3) | 7.9 (46.2) | 1.9 (35.4) | 13.3 (55.9) |
| Daily mean °C (°F) | −5 (23) | −4.4 (24.1) | 0.6 (33.1) | 7.0 (44.6) | 13.7 (56.7) | 19.2 (66.6) | 22.1 (71.8) | 21.1 (70.0) | 16.9 (62.4) | 10.0 (50.0) | 4.1 (39.4) | −1.6 (29.1) | 8.6 (47.5) |
| Mean daily minimum °C (°F) | −8.9 (16.0) | −8.5 (16.7) | −3.8 (25.2) | 1.9 (35.4) | 8.2 (46.8) | 13.9 (57.0) | 16.6 (61.9) | 15.8 (60.4) | 11.6 (52.9) | 5.3 (41.5) | 0.2 (32.4) | −5 (23) | 3.9 (39.0) |
| Mean minimum °C (°F) | −19.9 (−3.8) | −18.7 (−1.7) | −13.8 (7.2) | −4.8 (23.4) | 1.2 (34.2) | 7.3 (45.1) | 11.4 (52.5) | 10.6 (51.1) | 4.5 (40.1) | −1.5 (29.3) | −7.9 (17.8) | −14.9 (5.2) | −22.0 (−7.6) |
| Record low °C (°F) | −31.3 (−24.3) | −31.1 (−24.0) | −28.9 (−20.0) | −17.2 (1.0) | −5.6 (21.9) | 0.6 (33.1) | 3.9 (39.0) | 1.1 (34.0) | −3.9 (25.0) | −8.3 (17.1) | −18.3 (−0.9) | −31.1 (−24.0) | −31.3 (−24.3) |
| Record low wind chill | −44.7 | −38.9 | −36.2 | −25.4 | −9.5 | 0.0 | 0.0 | 0.0 | −8.0 | −13.5 | −25.4 | −38.5 | −44.7 |
| Average precipitation mm (inches) | 61.6 (2.43) | 50.2 (1.98) | 50.5 (1.99) | 76.7 (3.02) | 77.6 (3.06) | 80.7 (3.18) | 74.0 (2.91) | 68.5 (2.70) | 69.4 (2.73) | 67.2 (2.65) | 71.8 (2.83) | 58.6 (2.31) | 806.8 (31.76) |
| Average rainfall mm (inches) | 33.8 (1.33) | 23.9 (0.94) | 34.0 (1.34) | 70.7 (2.78) | 77.5 (3.05) | 80.7 (3.18) | 74.0 (2.91) | 68.5 (2.70) | 69.4 (2.73) | 67.0 (2.64) | 62.7 (2.47) | 35.3 (1.39) | 697.4 (27.46) |
| Average snowfall cm (inches) | 31.5 (12.4) | 27.7 (10.9) | 17.2 (6.8) | 4.5 (1.8) | 0.1 (0.0) | 0.0 (0.0) | 0.0 (0.0) | 0.0 (0.0) | 0.0 (0.0) | 0.2 (0.1) | 9.3 (3.7) | 24.1 (9.5) | 114.5 (45.1) |
| Average precipitation days (≥ 0.2 mm) | 16.2 | 12.0 | 12.3 | 12.5 | 12.7 | 10.8 | 10.3 | 9.8 | 10.2 | 12.8 | 12.6 | 14.9 | 147.3 |
| Average rainy days (≥ 0.2 mm) | 6.2 | 4.6 | 7.2 | 11.7 | 12.7 | 10.8 | 10.3 | 9.8 | 10.2 | 12.8 | 10.4 | 7.5 | 114.1 |
| Average snowy days (≥ 0.2 cm) | 12.7 | 9.7 | 6.8 | 2.2 | 0.12 | 0.0 | 0.0 | 0.0 | 0.0 | 0.24 | 3.6 | 9.2 | 44.7 |
| Average relative humidity (%) (at 15:00) | 69.7 | 65.7 | 58.5 | 53.4 | 53.6 | 54.4 | 52.9 | 55.2 | 57.3 | 61.6 | 66.7 | 70.5 | 60.0 |
| Average dew point °C (°F) | −8.6 (16.5) | −8.4 (16.9) | −5.2 (22.6) | −0.4 (31.3) | 6.4 (43.5) | 12.3 (54.1) | 14.9 (58.8) | 14.9 (58.8) | 11.6 (52.9) | 5.5 (41.9) | −0.1 (31.8) | −4.9 (23.2) | 3.2 (37.8) |
| Mean monthly sunshine hours | 79.7 | 112.2 | 159.4 | 204.4 | 228.2 | 249.7 | 294.4 | 274.5 | 215.7 | 163.7 | 94.2 | 86.2 | 2,161.4 |
| Percentage possible sunshine | 27.6 | 38.0 | 43.2 | 50.8 | 50.1 | 54.1 | 63.0 | 63.4 | 57.4 | 47.8 | 32.0 | 30.9 | 46.5 |
Source 1: Environment and Climate Change Canada
Source 2: weatherstats.ca (for dewpoint and monthly/yearly average absolute maximum/minimum temperature)

Data is from Georgetown, located 10.93 km (6.79 mi) south-southwest.

Climate data for Georgetown WWTP (Halton Hills) Climate ID: 6152695; coordinates 43°28′34″N 79°52′45″W; elevation: 221 m (725 ft); 1981–2010 normals
| Month | Jan | Feb | Mar | Apr | May | Jun | Jul | Aug | Sep | Oct | Nov | Dec | Year |
|---|---|---|---|---|---|---|---|---|---|---|---|---|---|
| Record high °C (°F) | 17.0 (62.6) | 15.5 (59.9) | 25.0 (77.0) | 31.5 (88.7) | 34.5 (94.1) | 36.0 (96.8) | 37.0 (98.6) | 36.5 (97.7) | 35.5 (95.9) | 29.5 (85.1) | 22.0 (71.6) | 20.5 (68.9) | 37.0 (98.6) |
| Mean daily maximum °C (°F) | −1.7 (28.9) | −0.2 (31.6) | 4.6 (40.3) | 12.1 (53.8) | 19.1 (66.4) | 24.4 (75.9) | 26.9 (80.4) | 25.8 (78.4) | 21.4 (70.5) | 14.3 (57.7) | 7.3 (45.1) | 1.1 (34.0) | 12.9 (55.2) |
| Daily mean °C (°F) | −6.3 (20.7) | −5.2 (22.6) | −0.9 (30.4) | 6.0 (42.8) | 12.3 (54.1) | 17.4 (63.3) | 20.0 (68.0) | 19.0 (66.2) | 14.8 (58.6) | 8.4 (47.1) | 2.8 (37.0) | −2.9 (26.8) | 7.1 (44.8) |
| Mean daily minimum °C (°F) | −10.9 (12.4) | −10.2 (13.6) | −6.4 (20.5) | −0.2 (31.6) | 5.3 (41.5) | 10.4 (50.7) | 13.0 (55.4) | 12.1 (53.8) | 8.1 (46.6) | 2.4 (36.3) | −1.7 (28.9) | −6.9 (19.6) | 1.3 (34.3) |
| Record low °C (°F) | −33.0 (−27.4) | −31.5 (−24.7) | −28.0 (−18.4) | −13.0 (8.6) | −5.0 (23.0) | −0.5 (31.1) | 3.0 (37.4) | 0.0 (32.0) | −4.0 (24.8) | −8.5 (16.7) | −15.5 (4.1) | −29.5 (−21.1) | −33.0 (−27.4) |
| Average precipitation mm (inches) | 67.8 (2.67) | 60.0 (2.36) | 57.2 (2.25) | 76.5 (3.01) | 79.3 (3.12) | 74.8 (2.94) | 73.5 (2.89) | 79.3 (3.12) | 86.2 (3.39) | 68.3 (2.69) | 88.5 (3.48) | 65.9 (2.59) | 877.4 (34.54) |
| Average rainfall mm (inches) | 29.7 (1.17) | 28.4 (1.12) | 35.2 (1.39) | 71.3 (2.81) | 79.0 (3.11) | 74.8 (2.94) | 73.5 (2.89) | 79.3 (3.12) | 86.2 (3.39) | 67.8 (2.67) | 79.9 (3.15) | 36.4 (1.43) | 741.5 (29.19) |
| Average snowfall cm (inches) | 38.1 (15.0) | 31.7 (12.5) | 22.1 (8.7) | 5.2 (2.0) | 0.3 (0.1) | 0.0 (0.0) | 0.0 (0.0) | 0.0 (0.0) | 0.0 (0.0) | 0.5 (0.2) | 8.6 (3.4) | 29.5 (11.6) | 135.9 (53.5) |
| Average precipitation days (≥ 0.2 mm) | 12.6 | 9.4 | 10.6 | 12.4 | 11.9 | 11.2 | 10.6 | 10.6 | 11.7 | 12.3 | 13.3 | 12.3 | 138.9 |
| Average rainy days (≥ 0.2 mm) | 4.1 | 4.1 | 6.4 | 11.6 | 11.8 | 11.2 | 10.6 | 10.6 | 11.7 | 12.2 | 11.4 | 6.5 | 112.1 |
| Average snowy days (≥ 0.2 cm) | 9.4 | 6.2 | 4.8 | 1.4 | 0.04 | 0.0 | 0.0 | 0.0 | 0.0 | 0.27 | 2.5 | 6.9 | 31.5 |
Source: Environment and Climate Change Canada

== Demographics ==
Historical populations
| Year | Pop. | ±% |
|---|---|---|
| 1858 | 50 | — |
| 1871 | 2,090 | +4080.0% |
| 1881 | 2,920 | +39.7% |
| 1891 | 3,252 | +11.4% |
| 1901 | 2,748 | −15.5% |
| 1911 | 3,412 | +24.2% |
| 1921 | 4,527 | +32.7% |
| 1931 | 5,532 | +22.2% |
| 1941 | 5,975 | +8.0% |
| 1951 | 8,389 | +40.4% |
| 1961 | 18,467 | +120.1% |
| 1971 | 41,211 | +123.2% |
| 1981 | 149,030 | +261.6% |
| 1991 | 234,445 | +57.3% |
| 1996 | 268,251 | +14.4% |
| 2001 | 325,428 | +21.3% |
| 2006 | 433,806 | +33.3% |
| 2011 | 523,906 | +20.8% |
| 2016 | 593,638 | +13.3% |
| 2021 | 656,480 | +10.6% |
Brampton annexed Chinguacousy—which included the highly populated community of Bramalea—and Toronto Gore Townships in 1974. The 2011 population count was revised in 2016.

In the 2021 Canadian census conducted by Statistics Canada, Brampton had a population of 656,480 living in 182,472 of its 189,086 total private dwellings, a change of 10.6% from its 2016 population of 593,638. With a land area of 265.89 km^{2} (102.66 sq mi), it had a population density of 2,469.0/km^{2} (6,394.7/sq mi) in 2021. At its growth rate of 10.6% since the 2016 census, Brampton was the fastest-growing of Canada's largest 25 municipalities.

=== Ethnicity ===
Largest ethnic origin in Brampton excluding Indian by census tract based on the 2021 census

In the 2021 Canadian census, people of South Asian origin were the largest ethnocultural group in Brampton—accounting for 52.4% of the population. The remaining groups included those of European (18.9%), Black (13.1%), Filipino (3.2%), Latin American (2.1%), Southeast Asian (1.4%), Chinese (1.1%), West Asian (1.1%), and Arab (1%) ancestry. The city is ethnically diverse with approximately 60% of Brampton's residents being foreign-born.

Largest non-South Asian panethnic group in Brampton by census tracts based based on the 2021 census

Panethnic groups in the City of Brampton (1996–2021)
| Panethnic group | 2021 | | 2016 | | 2011 | | 2006 | | 2001 | | 1996 | |
| Panethnic group | Pop. | % | Pop. | % | Pop. | % | Pop. | % | Pop. | % | Pop. | % |
|---|---|---|---|---|---|---|---|---|---|---|---|---|
| South Asian | 340,815 | 52.42% | 261,705 | 44.29% | 200,220 | 38.41% | 136,750 | 31.69% | 63,205 | 19.48% | 34,720 | 13% |
| European (Note: Statistic includes all persons that did not make up part of a visible minority or an indigenous identity.) | 123,060 | 18.93% | 153,390 | 25.96% | 171,655 | 32.93% | 182,760 | 42.35% | 192,395 | 59.31% | 186,270 | 69.72% |
| Black | 85,310 | 13.12% | 82,175 | 13.91% | 70,290 | 13.48% | 53,340 | 12.36% | 32,070 | 9.89% | 21,810 | 8.16% |
| Southeast Asian (Note: Statistic includes total responses of "Filipino" and "Southeast Asian" under visible minority section on census.) | 30,155 | 4.64% | 28,525 | 4.83% | 26,535 | 5.09% | 18,110 | 4.2% | 9,970 | 3.07% | 6,990 | 2.62% |
| Middle Eastern (Note: Statistic includes total responses of "West Asian" and "Arab" under visible minority section on census.) | 13,715 | 2.11% | 11,320 | 1.92% | 7,610 | 1.46% | 5,475 | 1.27% | 2,935 | 0.9% | 1,995 | 0.75% |
| Latin American | 13,490 | 2.07% | 14,045 | 2.38% | 11,405 | 2.19% | 8,545 | 1.98% | 5,225 | 1.61% | 2,595 | 0.97% |
| East Asian (Note: Statistic includes total responses of "Chinese", "Korean", and "Japanese" under visible minority section on census.) | 8,000 | 1.23% | 9,915 | 1.68% | 9,235 | 1.77% | 8,930 | 2.07% | 6,595 | 2.03% | 6,100 | 2.28% |
| Indigenous | 3,255 | 0.5% | 4,330 | 0.73% | 3,430 | 0.66% | 2,665 | 0.62% | 1,720 | 0.53% | 950 | 0.36% |
| Other/Multiracial (Note: Statistic includes total responses of "Visible minority, n.i.e." and "Multiple visible minorities" under visible minority section on census.) | 32,370 | 4.98% | 25,535 | 4.32% | 20,940 | 4.02% | 14,995 | 3.47% | 10,290 | 3.17% | 5,740 | 2.15% |
| Total responses | 650,165 | 99.04% | 590,950 | 99.55% | 521,315 | 99.5% | 431,575 | 99.49% | 324,390 | 99.68% | 267,170 | 99.6% |
| Total population | 656,480 | 100% | 593,638 | 100% | 523,911 | 100% | 433,806 | 100% | 325,428 | 100% | 268,251 | 100% |
Note: Totals greater than 100% due to multiple origin responses

Religion in Brampton (2021)
1. Christianity (35.7%)
2. Sikhism (25.1%)
3. Hinduism (18.1%)
4. No Religion (10.3%)
5. Islam (9.10%)
6. Buddhism (1.10%)
7. Judaism (0.10%)
8. Indigenous (0.00%)
9. Other Religions (0.40%)

=== Religion ===
In 2021, the most reported religion among the population was Christianity (35.7%), with Catholicism (17.3%) making up the largest denomination. This was followed by Sikhism (25.1%), Hinduism (18.1%), Islam (9.1%), and Buddhism (1.1%). 10.3% of the population did not identify with a particular religion. The Toronto Ontario Temple for the Church of Jesus Christ of Latter-day Saints (LDS Church) is located in Brampton.

Religious groups in the City of Brampton (1991−2021)
| Religious group | 2021 | | 2011 | | 2001 | | 1991 | |
| Religious group | Pop. | % | Pop. | % | Pop. | % | Pop. | % |
|---|---|---|---|---|---|---|---|---|
| Christian | 232,220 | 35.72% | 263,385 | 50.52% | 219,880 | 67.78% | 185,780 | 79.58% |
| Sikh | 163,260 | 25.11% | 97,790 | 18.76% | 34,510 | 10.64% | 8,630 | 3.7% |
| Hindu | 117,395 | 18.06% | 63,390 | 12.16% | 17,640 | 5.44% | 6,415 | 2.75% |
| Muslim | 59,445 | 9.14% | 36,960 | 7.09% | 11,470 | 3.54% | 4,660 | 2% |
| Buddhist | 7,105 | 1.09% | 6,715 | 1.29% | 3,340 | 1.03% | 1,290 | 0.55% |
| Jewish | 535 | 0.08% | 830 | 0.16% | 610 | 0.19% | 805 | 0.34% |
| Other religion | 2,940 | 0.45% | 1,340 | 0.26% | 930 | 0.29% | 440 | 0.19% |
| Irreligious | 67,265 | 10.35% | 50,885 | 9.76% | 36,010 | 11.1% | 25,435 | 10.89% |
| Total responses | 650,165 | 99.04% | 521,315 | 99.5% | 324,390 | 99.68% | 233,460 | 99.58% |

=== Language ===
The 2021 census found that English was the mother tongue of 42.9% of the population. The next most common mother tongues were Punjabi (21.7%), Gujarati (3.4%), Urdu (3.4%), Hindi (3%), and Tamil (2.2%). The most commonly known languages were English (95.1%), Punjabi (29.1%), Hindi (17.5%), Urdu (6%), Gujarati (4.7%), and French (4.6%).

| Mother tongue | Population | % |
|---|---|---|
| English | 279,415 | 42.9 |
| Punjabi | 141,005 | 21.7 |
| Gujarati | 22,000 | 3.4 |
| Urdu | 21,945 | 3.4 |
| Hindi | 19,645 | 3 |
| Tamil | 14,030 | 2.2 |
| Spanish | 10,185 | 1.6 |
| Tagalog (Filipino) | 9,905 | 1.5 |
| Portuguese | 8,640 | 1.3 |
| Italian | 5,430 | 0.8 |
| Vietnamese | 4,230 | 0.6 |
| Arabic | 4,100 | 0.6 |
| Malayalam | 3,930 | 0.6 |
| French | 3,810 | 0.6 |
| Polish | 3,430 | 0.5 |
| Bengali | 3,060 | 0.5 |
| Telugu | 2,920 | 0.4 |
| Yue (Cantonese) | 2,775 | 0.4 |
| Akan (Twi) | 2,530 | 0.4 |
| Dari | 2,305 | 0.4 |
| Mandarin | 2,195 | 0.3 |
| Nepali | 1,945 | 0.3 |
| Assyrian Neo-Aramaic | 1,940 | 0.3 |
| Sinhala (Sinhalese) | 1,555 | 0.2 |
| Serbo-Croatian | 1,385 | 0.2 |

| Knowledge of Language | Population | % |
|---|---|---|
| English | 618,060 | 95.1 |
| Punjabi | 189,235 | 29.1 |
| Hindi | 113,515 | 17.5 |
| Urdu | 38,725 | 6 |
| Gujarati | 30,310 | 4.7 |
| French | 30,010 | 4.6 |
| Tamil | 21,475 | 3.3 |
| Spanish | 15,395 | 2.4 |
| Tagalog (Filipino) | 14,925 | 2.3 |
| Portuguese | 11,765 | 1.8 |
| Italian | 8,905 | 1.4 |
| Arabic | 8,475 | 1.3 |
| Malayalam | 6,090 | 0.9 |
| Vietnamese | 6,030 | 0.9 |
| Telugu | 5,540 | 0.9 |
| Bengali | 5,080 | 0.8 |
| Akan (Twi) | 4,555 | 0.7 |
| Polish | 4,150 | 0.6 |
| Yue (Cantonese) | 3,680 | 0.6 |
| Mandarin | 3,660 | 0.6 |
| Dari | 3,350 | 0.5 |
| Marathi | 3,185 | 0.5 |
| Yoruba | 3,050 | 0.5 |
| Sinhala (Sinhalese) | 2,540 | 0.4 |
| Assyrian Neo-Aramaic | 2,440 | 0.4 |

== Economy ==
Companies with headquarters in Brampton include MDA Space Missions, which will be building the CanadaArm 3. Loblaw Companies Ltd., Chrysler Canada Brampton Assembly Plant, Gamma-Dynacare Medical Laboratories, Mandarin Restaurant, Brita, Shoppers Drug Mart, Canon, Canadian Blood Services, Sleep Country Canada and Clorox.

Other major companies operating in Brampton include, Boston Scientific, DSV, Air Canada Global Operations, Rogers Communications, Magna International, CN Rail Brampton Intermodal Terminal, Best Buy, Amazon which has four production facilities in the city, Nestlé, Hudson's Bay Company (HBC), Frito Lay Canada, Coca-Cola, and Canadian Tire which has two distribution facilities in the city.

William Osler Health System employs approximately 5,000 at its Brampton Civic and Peel Memorial campuses.

Lululemon, and Pet Valu have their main GTA distribution centres in the city. Wolseley Plumbing built a distribution centre and showroom in Brampton in 2024.

Alstom has an assembly plant in Brampton to fulfil their contract with Metrolinx to build Alstom Citadis Spirit LRV cars for the TTC Finch West (ordered in 2017 with delivery beginning 2021 to be completed by 2023), Hurontario and Eglinton LRT lines. The Hurontario LRT maintenance facility is currently being built in Brampton.

It is also the location of the Canadian Forces Army Reserve unit The Lorne Scots (Peel, Dufferin and Halton Regiment).

An automobile manufacturing facility was opened by American Motors (AMC) in 1960 as the Brampton Assembly Plant. In 1986, AMC developed a new, state-of-the-art operation at Bramalea. After AMC was acquired by Chrysler in 1987, AMC's Canadian division and its plants were absorbed; the older facility in Brampton closed in 1992. The newest factory was renamed Brampton Assembly; it is one of the city's largest employers, with almost 4,000 workers when running at capacity.

== Education ==
The Algoma University at Brampton School of Business & Economics offers courses at Market Square Business Centre, 24 Queen Street East. The closest universities to Brampton (offering a wider range of programs) include York University in north Toronto and University of Toronto Mississauga.

Along with that, Sheridan College's Davis Campus is another major public higher education institution serving Brampton which also has campuses in Oakville and Mississauga. In 2017, Davis added the Skilled Trades Centre, for training in skilled trades and apprenticeship programs, previously offered in Oakville.

A plan by Toronto Metropolitan University, in partnership with Sheridan College was to establish a new campus in Brampton with a goal of opening a new medical school. In September 2025, Toronto Metropolitan University (TMU) officially opened its School of Medicine in Brampton, the first new medical school in the Greater Toronto Area in over a century. Designed by Diamond Schmitt Architects in consultation with Indigenous-owned firm Two Row Architect, the school welcomed its inaugural cohort of 94 undergraduate medical students, selected from more than 6,400 applicants.

Brampton also has many private post-secondary institutions offering vocational training including Springfield College Brampton, CDI College, TriOS College, Academy of Learning, Evergreen College, Medix College, CIMT College, Torbram College, Bitts International Career College, Canadian College of Business, Science & Technology, Hanson College, Queenswood College B, H & T, Flair College of Management and Technology, Sunview College, and College Of Health Studies.

Two main school boards operate in Brampton: the Peel District School Board, which operates secular anglophone public schools, and Dufferin-Peel Catholic District School Board, which operates Catholic anglophone public schools. Under the Peel District School Board, the secondary schools are Bramalea, Brampton Centennial, Central Peel, Chinguacousy, Fletcher's Meadow, Harold M. Brathwaite, Heart Lake, Louise Arbour, Mayfield, North Park, Judith Nyman, Sandalwood Heights, Turner Fenton, David Suzuki, Castlebrooke Secondary School, and Jean Augustine, one of the newest. A total of 85 elementary and middle schools feed these high schools in the city.

Under the Dufferin-Peel Catholic District School Board, the secondary schools are Cardinal Leger, Holy Name of Mary, Notre Dame, St. Augustine, St. Edmund Campion, St. Roch, St. Marguerite d'Youville, St. Thomas Aquinas, and Cardinal Ambrozic. A total of 44 Catholic elementary and middle schools feed these high schools in the city.

The Conseil scolaire Viamonde operates secular Francophone schools serving the area. The Conseil scolaire catholique MonAvenir operates Catholic Francophone schools serving the area.

== Culture ==
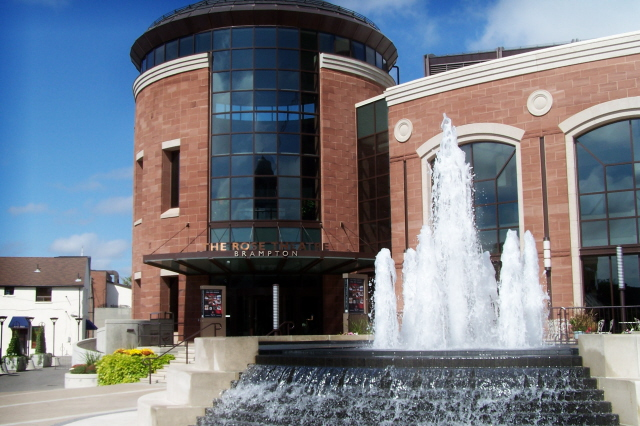
The Rose Theatre Fountain Stage

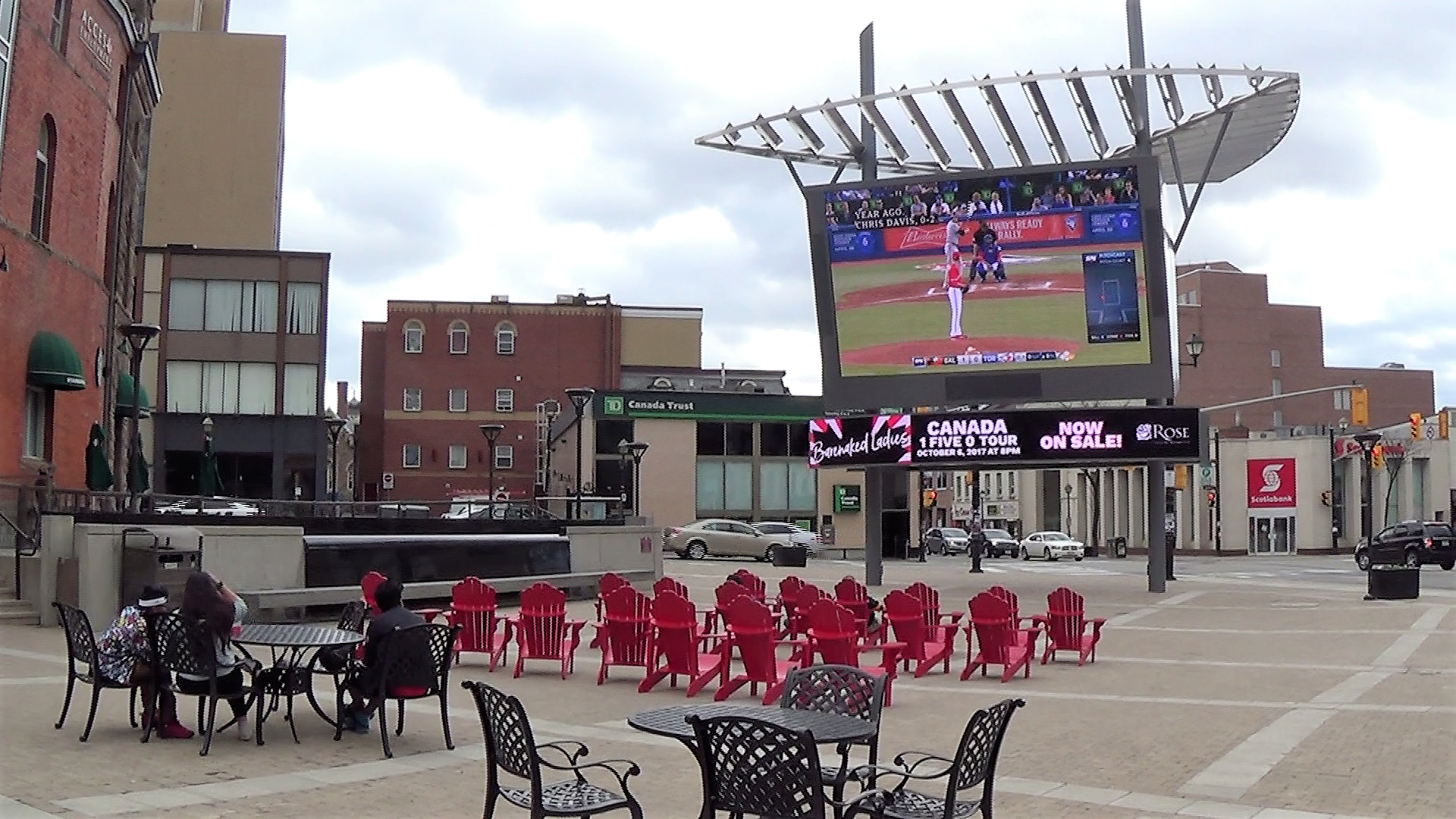
LCD video screen at Garden Square, downtown

Several cultural entities in the city operate under the umbrella of the Brampton Arts Council. Located in the city is the Peel Art Gallery, Museum and Archives (PAMA, formerly the Peel Heritage Complex), which is run by the Region of Peel.

The Rose Theatre (originally the Brampton Performing Arts Centre), opened in September 2006. The city had expected the facility to generate $2.7 million in economic activity the first year, growing to $19.8 million by the fifth year. The Rose Theatre far surpassed projections, attracting more than 137,000 patrons in its inaugural year, which exceeded its five-year goal. The arrival of so many new patrons downtown has stimulated the development of numerous new businesses nearby. A new Fountain Stage was unveiled in June 2008 at the nearby Garden Square.

Brampton has eight library branches to serve its population.

Festivals in the city include the annual Festival of Literary Diversity, a literary festival devoted to writers from underrepresented groups such as people of colour and LGBTQ writers.

The Peel Art Gallery, Museum and Archives (PAMA) in Brampton includes a museum, art gallery, and archives. Since opening in 1968, the art gallery section (previously known as the Art Gallery of Peel) has exhibited local, national, and international artists, both contemporary and historical from their permanent collection.

The City of Brampton's long-standing heritage conservation program was recognised with the 2011 Lieutenant Governor's Ontario Heritage Award for Community Leadership. In 2010, the city received an 'honourable mention' under the same provincial awards program.

=== Sites of interest ===
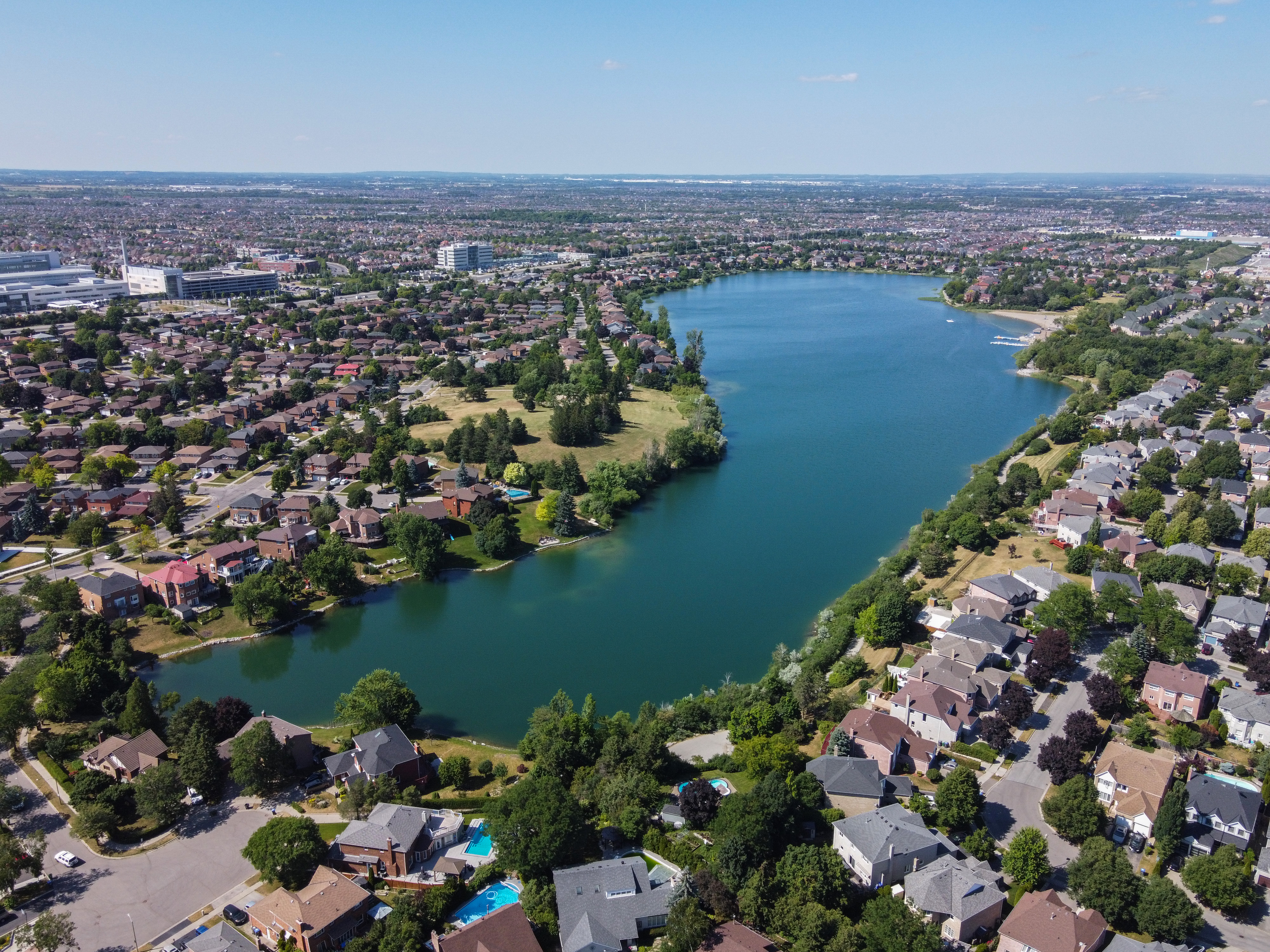
Professor's Lake

- Gage Park
- CAA Centre
- Camp Naivelt
- Chinguacousy Park-Greenhouse and gardens
- Mount Chinguacousy
- Claireville Conservation Area
- Heart Lake Conservation Area
- Brampton Historical Society
- Historic Bovaird House
- Korean War Memorial Wall
- Peel Art Gallery, Museum and Archives
- Professor's Lake
- Rose Theatre
- Lester B. Pearson Theatre
- Wet'n'Wild Toronto

Major shopping areas include Bramalea City Centre, Shoppers World, and "big box centre" Trinity Commons. The downtown area has some retail; the Centennial Mall and the Brampton Mall are also of note.

=== Media ===
Brampton was one of the first areas where Rogers Cable offered its service. The city started a community access channel in the 1970s, which still operates. While some programs on the channel are produced in its Brampton studios, most are based in its Mississauga location. Christian specialty channel Vertical TV is based in Brampton.

The Brampton Guardian is the community's only newspaper, starting as the Bramalea Guardian in 1964. The city's first newspaper, The Daily Times, ceased publication in the early 1980s. For a little over a year, The Brampton Bulletin attempted to challenge the Guardian, but it was dismantled after a series of editor changes.

Brampton is the official city of license for two radio stations, CHLO and CFNY. Both stations address their programming toward the entire Greater Toronto Area rather than exclusively to Brampton. CFNY was located upstairs at 83 Kennedy Road until moving to Toronto in 1996.

=== Sports and recreation ===
Sports teams of Brampton
| Team | League | Sport | Venue | Established | Championships |
|---|---|---|---|---|---|
| Brampton Honey Badgers | Canadian Elite Basketball League | Basketball | CAA Centre | 2019* | 1 |
| Brampton Wolves | Global T20 Canada | Cricket | CAA Centre | 2019 | 1 |
| Brampton CPL Team | Canadian Premier League | Soccer | CAA Centre | TBA | TBA |
| Brampton Steelheads | Ontario Hockey League | Ice Hockey | CAA Centre | 1996* | 0 |
| Toronto MLC Team | Major League Cricket | Cricket | Texas/California hubs | 2026* | 0 |

=== Former sports ===
former Sports teams of Brampton
| Team | League | Sport | Venue | Established | Disestablished | Championships |
|---|---|---|---|---|---|---|
| Brampton A's | National Basketball League of Canada | Basketball | CAA Centre | 2013 | 2015 | 0 |
| Brampton Admirals | Ontario Junior Hockey League | Hockey | Brampton Memorial Arena | 2018 | 2021 | 0 |
| Brampton Battalion | OHL | Hockey | CAA Centre | 1998 | 2013 | 0 |
| Brampton Beast | ECHL | Hockey | CAA Centre | 2013 | 2021 | 0 |
| Bramalea Blues | Ontario Provincial Junior A Hockey League | Hockey | CAA Centre | 1972 | 2010 | 1 |
| Brampton Bombers | Greater Ontario Junior Hockey League | Hockey | Brampton Memorial Arena | 2012 | 2020 | 0 |
| Brampton Thunder | Canadian Women's Hockey League | Hockey | CAA Centre | 1999 | 2017 | 0 |
| Brampton Capitals | Ontario Provincial Junior A Hockey League | Hockey | Brampton Memorial Arena | 1984 | 2012 | 4 |
| Junior "b" Excelsiors | OLA Junior B Lacrosse League | Box Lacrosse | Victoria Park Arena | 2012 | | 0 |
| Bramalea Satellites | Northern Football Conference | Football | | 1974 | 1975 | |
| Brampton City United FC | Canadian Soccer League, First Division | Soccer | Victoria Park Stadium | 2002 | 2016 | 1 |

- The Honey Badgers relocated from Hamilton for the 2023 season.
- The Steelheads relocated from Mississauga for the 2024–25 season.

Brampton has been home to minor professional sports franchises at the CAA Centre, formerly the Powerade Centre. From 2013 to 2015, the Brampton A's played in the National Basketball League of Canada, but relocated to Orangeville, Ontario, to decrease costs of operations of switching the arena floor from ice hockey to basketball. From 2013 to 2020, the Brampton Beast played in the Central Hockey League and ECHL, but ceased operations during the COVID-19 pandemic in February 2021 after having not been able to play since March 2020.

The numerous sporting venues and activities includes the outdoor ice path for skating through Gage Park. Chinguacousy Park includes a ski lift, a curling club, and Tennis Centre for multi-season activities. In the summer, amateur softball leagues abound. Crowds line the beaches at Professor's Lake for the annual outdoor "shagging" display.

Since 1967, the Brampton Canadettes have hosted the annual Brampton Canadettes Easter Tournament in hockey.

Brampton was also the host for the following major sports events:

- 2013 Junior Women's Softball World Championship.
- 2023 IIHF Women's World Championship
- 2023 World Junior Girls Golf Championship

== Infrastructure ==
=== Health and medicine ===
William Osler Health System operates two health facilities in the city.

=== Courts ===
The A. Grenville & William Davis Courthouse which houses branches for the Ontario Court of Justice and the Ontario Superior Court of Justice, is located at 7755 Hurontario Street (Hurontario Street at County Court).

=== Jails ===
The Brampton Jail, located in the city, is now defunct and has been turned into a museum.

The Roy McMurtry Youth Centre is a juvenile detention centre located in Brampton.

== Transportation ==
=== Public transit ===
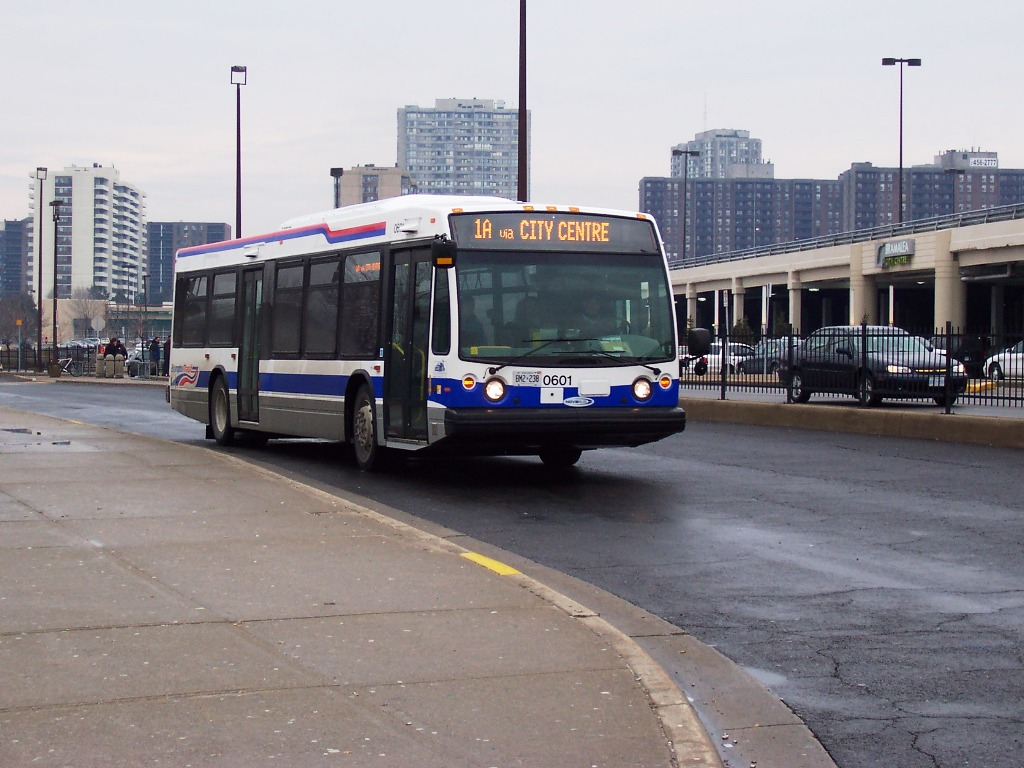
Brampton Transit bus at the now-relocated Bramalea City Centre Terminal

Local transit is provided by Brampton Transit, with connections to other systems such as MiWay, York Region Transit, GO Transit, and Toronto Transit Commission. Brampton Transit also operates a bus rapid transit system, "Züm" (pronounced Zoom), along Main/Hurontario Streets, Steeles Avenue, Queen Street/Highway 7, Bovaird Drive–Airport Road, and Queen Street West–Mississauga Road, which form the backbone to its bus network.

There is GO Bus service to York University and subway stations at Yorkdale Mall and York Mills in Toronto. There are three GO Train stations in Brampton along the Kitchener line: Bramalea, Brampton and Mount Pleasant.

=== Rail ===
Both Canadian National Railway (CN) and the Orangeville-Brampton Railway short line (formerly part of the Canadian Pacific Railway (CP) line) run through the city. CN's Intermodal Yards are located east of Airport Road between Steeles and Queen Street East. The CN Track from Toronto's Union Station is used by the Kitchener GO Transit Rail Corridor providing commuter rail to and from Toronto with rail station stops at Bramalea, Downtown Brampton, and Mount Pleasant. Via Rail connects through Brampton as part of the Quebec City-Windsor Corridor.

=== Air ===
Canada's busiest airport, Toronto Pearson International Airport (CYYZ), is located near Brampton, in Mississauga. For general aviation, the city is served by the privately owned Brampton Airport (CNC3), located to the north of the city in neighbouring Caledon. There is also a registered helipad Brampton National D (CPC4) located near the Brampton/Vaughan border, at Countryside Drive and Coleraine Drive.

=== Road ===
Brampton is served by several major transportation routes: Highway 401 from Toronto is a short distance south in Mississauga, and can be reached by Highway 410, which runs north–south through the middle of the city. Highway 407 runs along the southern portion of the city, just north of the boundary with Mississauga. Steeles Avenue, which runs north of the 407, is a thoroughfare continuing from Toronto. Queen Street is the city's main east–west street. Farther north, Bovaird Drive is another main artery. Sections of both Queen (eastern portion) and Bovaird (western portion) were part the former Highway 7, (now Regional Road 107), with Highway 410 being the route followed between the two streets. Main Street, part of the historic road, Hurontario Street (as well as Hurontario proper in the northern and southern parts of the city), and formerly Highway 10, is the city's main north–south artery. In the east end, Airport Road is a busy artery that is used as a route north to Wasaga Beach, a popular beach resort town.

== Representation in other media ==
- Deepa Mehta's 2008 film Heaven on Earth is set in Brampton.

== Notable people ==
Four people from Brampton have received the Order of Canada: Robert William Bradford, former Director of the National Aviation Museum; Michael F. Clarke, director at Evergreen, the Yonge Street Mission for street youth in Toronto; Howard Pawley, professor and former Premier of Manitoba; and William G. Davis, former Premier of Ontario.

=== Sports ===
- Baseball: Zach Pop
- Basketball: Michael Meeks (internationally), Tyler Ennis (NBA), Tristan Thompson (NBA), Anthony Bennett (NBA)
- Cricket: Saad Bin Zafar, Cecil Pervez,
- Curling: Scott Bailey, Peter Corner, Graeme McCarrel, Wayne Middaugh, Allison Pottinger
- Field hockey: Bernadette Bowyer
- Figure skating: Vern Taylor, Mark Janoschak
- Football: Michael Bailey (CFL), Fernand Kashama (CFL), Chris Kowalczuk (CFL), Rob Maver (CFL), Jerome Messam (CFL, NFL), Jason Nugent (CFL), Junior Turner (CFL), Steven Turner (CFL), Jabar Westerman (CFL), Jamaal Westerman (NFL), James Yurichuk (CFL) Nakas Onyeka (CFL)
- Golf: David Hearn; Steve Duplantis (caddy)
- Hockey: Andrew Cassels, Mike Danton, Mike Dwyer, Todd Elik, Chris Felix, Sheldon Keefe, Tom Laidlaw, Kris Newbury, Rick Nash, Tyler Seguin, Jamie Storr, Mike Weaver, Mike Wilson, Sean Monahan, Tyler Graovac, Cassie Campbell, Mikyla Grant-Mentis, Scott Wedgewood
- Horse-racing: Sid C. Attard, Patrick Husbands, Robert P. Tiller, Emma-Jayne Wilson
- Lacrosse: Jim Veltman (NLL)
- Sailing: Kevin Stittle
- Soccer: Gabe Gala (MLS), Atiba Hutchinson (Super Lig), Peter Roe (ASL, MISL), Murphy Wiredu, Doneil Henry, Junior Hoilett, Paul Stalteri, Roger Thompson, Cyle Larin, Tajon Buchanan, Kadeisha Buchanan, Jahkeele Marshall-Rutty, Liam Millar, David Barrie
- Speed skating: Tyson Heung
- Tennis: Jill Hetherington, Milos Raonic
- Track and field: Charles Allen, Mark Boswell, Kate Van Buskirk
- Wrestling: Ohenewa Akuffo

=== Politics ===
Three Canadian premiers got their start in Brampton; Premiers Tobias Norris and Howard Pawley OC of Manitoba, and "Brampton Billy", Ontario premier William Grenville Davis CC. Other notable politicians include John Coyne, and Conservative opposition leader Gordon Graydon. Alberta politician and businessman Sir James A. Lougheed was born in Brampton, and served 30 years in Senate; Regina mayor David Lynch Scott was born here.

President of the Treasury Board Tony Clement spent time as a Brampton MPP. John McDermid held various cabinet positions under Brian Mulroney, Bal Gosal Minister of State-Sport, and former Mayor Linda Jeffrey held cabinet positions at the provincial level. Incumbent mayor Patrick Brown served as leader of the Progressive Conservative Party of Ontario and as leader of the official opposition from 2015 until 2018 prior to serving as mayor. He was also a federal MP and provincial MPP, but not for Brampton.

Ruby Dhalla represented the riding of Brampton—Springdale in the Canadian House of Commons from 2004 to 2011 as a member of the Liberal Party. Dhalla and British Columbia Conservative MP Nina Grewal were the first Sikh women to serve in the Canadian House of Commons. Parm Gill was elected as the member of parliament from the Conservative Party of Canada for the riding of Brampton-Springdale in 2011, who was also appointed as the Parliamentary Secretary to the Minister of Veteran Affairs in 2013.

Jagmeet Singh began his political career in Brampton running in two elections in 2011, defeated in the federal election in May but elected Member of Provincial Parliament for Bramalea—Gore—Malton in October. In 2015 he became deputy leader of the Ontario New Democratic Party. In 2017 he became leader of the federal NDP, the first member of a visible minority to become permanent leader of a major federal party in Canada.

=== Arts ===
Authors born in or living in Brampton include Rohinton Mistry, Jesse Thistle, Edo Van Belkom and Rupi Kaur (poet).

Visual arts notables from Brampton include etcher Caroline Helena Armington, Ronald Bloore, Member of the Order of Canada; Organiser and member of the "Regina Five" (1960), watercolourist Jack Reid, and William Ronald, who was raised in town. Norman Mills Price. Animators David Feiss and Jay Stephens grew up here.

Music acts from Brampton include Punk band The Flatliners, Indie Rock band Moneen, R&B singer Keshia Chanté, country singer Johnny Reid, "Metal Queen" Lee Aaron and pop singer Alyssa Reid. Country singer and "World Champion Yodeller" Donn Reynolds lived here from 1969 to 1997. Barry Stock, guitarist from Three Days Grace was raised in Brampton, and currently resides in Caledon. Singer Alessia Cara, hip-hop artist Roy Woods, and hip-hop artist Tory Lanez were also born in Brampton. Hip-hop record producer WondaGurl was also born in Brampton.

=== Film, television and comedy ===
Two notable comedians hail from Brampton: Scott Thompson and Russell Peters.

Comedic actor Michael Cera was born and raised in Brampton. The twin actors Shawn Ashmore and Aaron Ashmore (Smallville) are Brampton-raised. The sibling actors Tyler Labine (Mad Love) and Kyle Labine were born in Brampton.

Other Brampton-born or affiliated actors include Paulo Costanzo, Jordan Gavaris, Gemini Award winner Kris Lemche, Lara Jean Chorostecki, Sabrina Grdevich, Nicole Lyn, actor and producer David J. Phillips, reality TV star and art dealer Billy Jamieson, performer George R. Robertson, and performer Sidhu Moose Wala.

Others include voice actor Brenna O'Brien, and on-air media personalities Cassie Campbell, Chris Connor, Chris Cuthbert and Scott McGillivray.

== Sister cities ==
Brampton has two sister cities as well as active economic, historic, and cultural relationships with others.

Sister cities:

- Miami Beach, Florida
- Plano, Texas

Friendship relationships:

- Ribeira Grande, Azores, Portugal
- Xuzhou, Jiangsu, China
- Brampton, Westmorland and Furness, Cumbria, England
- Marikina, Philippines
- Gapyeong, South Korea
- Fangshan District (Funhill), Beijing, China

== See also ==
- Brampton Board of Trade
- Brampton municipal election, 2006
- Downtown Brampton
- City of Brampton Arts Person of the Year
- List of airports in the Greater Toronto Area
- List of historic places in Brampton
- Southern Ontario
