= William James Gage =

Canadian entrepreneur

Sir William James Gage
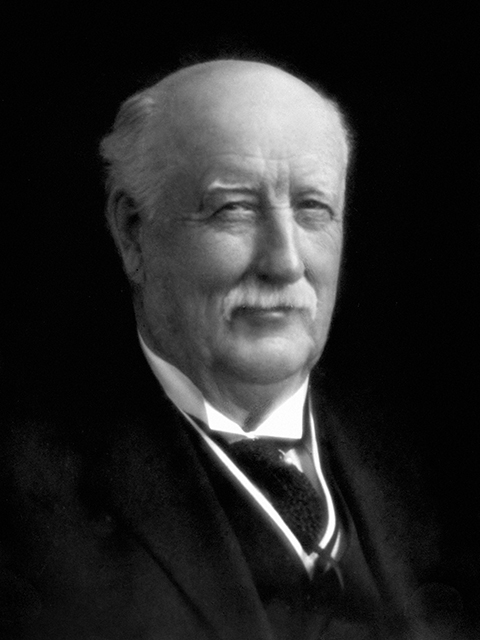
- Born: September 16, 1849; Toronto Township, Canada West
- Died: January 14, 1921 (aged 71); Toronto, Ontario
- Occupations: Publisher, philanthropist, public health pioneer

Sir William James Gage (September 16, 1849 – January 14, 1921) was a Canadian educator, entrepreneur and philanthropist.

== Life and career ==
Gage was born in Toronto Township, Canada West, the son of Andrew Albert Gage and Mary Jane Grafton. He was educated in Brampton and at the Toronto Normal School. Gage taught for three years and then briefly studied medicine.

He was hired as a bookkeeper by publisher Adam Miller and Company. After Miller's death in 1875, Gage became a partner in the business. In 1879, the firm was renamed W.J. Gage & Co. The company mainly specialized in textbooks but also sold writing paper and envelopes. In 1880, he married Ina Burnside.

Gage was one of the founders of the National Sanitarium Association and established several treatment facilities to combat tuberculosis, such as the Toronto Free Hospital for the Consumptive Poor. From 1893 to 1895, Gage was one of the owners of the Toronto Evening Star. He helped form the Ontario Associated Boards of Trade and served as its first president.

He was head of a group that opposed street car service on Sundays. He also lobbied for the development of Toronto's waterfront. Gage was a director for the Imperial Bank of Canada, Traders' Bank of Canada, Ontario Sugar Company and the Anglo-American Fire Insurance Company. He was also chairman of the Toronto branch of the Victorian Order of Nurses. Gage was knighted in 1917.

Gage donated land to the city of Brampton for use as a public park; it is now part of Gage Park. He died at his estate in Toronto at the age of 71 after suffering a stroke.
