= Professor's Lake =

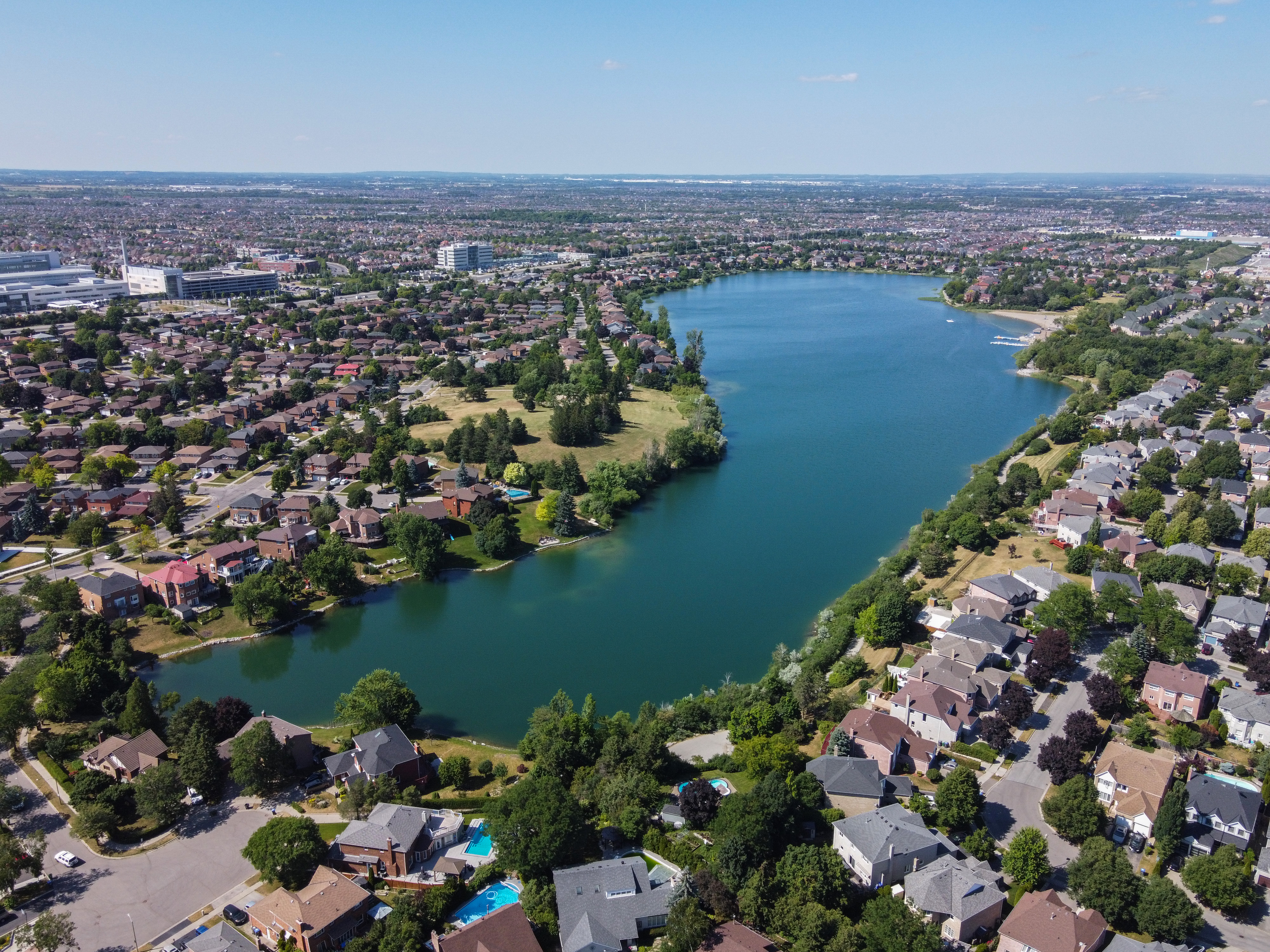
- Aerial view of Professor's Lake

- Location within Ontario
- Location: Brampton, Ontario
- Coordinates: 43°44′51″N 79°44′5″W
- Lake type: Artificial lake
- Basin countries: Canada
- Surface area: 65 acres (26 ha)
- Max. depth: 42 m (138 ft)
- Settlements: Brampton

Professor's Lake is a 65-acre (26 ha) spring-fed artificial lake located in Brampton, Ontario, Canada. In 1918, the area where the lake currently exists was a sand and gravel mining site supplying aggregates for construction projects in the northwest area of the Greater Toronto Area. During its lifetime, the site produced approximately 20 million tonnes (40 million tons) of aggregate. An aggregate (sand & gravel) production facility was established in 1954 and continued to operate until 1973 after aggregate deposits were exhausted. The aggregate processing and storage facility remained active for raw materials shipped from other sites for several years afterwards. Upon the site's closure, the land was remediated for future use as a residential area.

Land remediation was carried out by Standard Aggregates Ltd. by removing pumps formerly used to prevent flooding from the natural water table. Rehabilitation was completed and approved by the Ontario government in compliance with the Ontario Aggregate Resources Act. After the site's conversion to a lake, the property was sold several times before being purchased by the German based developer Lehndorff Corp. and its residential development arm AMEX. Several development proposals were considered and amended before the Brampton City Council agreed to a final proposal from AMEX. The final proposal covered the area currently bounded by Bramalea Rd., Bovaird Dr., Torbram Rd. and North Park Drive. The site is named after Dr. Hans Abromeit (PhD), a former economics professor and the President of Lehndorff at the time. He was referred to as the "Professor" by staff at Lehndorff and AMEX.

Several Ontario developers (Greenpark Homes, Lakeview Homes & Bramalea Limited.) purchased the area surrounding the lake from AMEX for residential construction during the 1980s and 90s. The lake is now used extensively for recreational activity such as paddle boarding, kayaking, windsurfing, fishing and canoeing. Professor's Lake Recreation Centre is located on the southside of the lake on North Park Drive. The Recreation Centre has a beach, waterslide, and boathouse that offers watercraft rentals. There are also three volleyball courts at the beach. A plaque issued by the Ontario Stone, Sand & Gravel Association commemorating the remediation efforts by Standard Aggregates Ltd. is mounted on a boulder outside the current recreation centre next to the parking lot.

The residential neighbourhood surrounding the lake is also widely referred to as Professor's Lake. The western border of the lake is bordered by homes and a small park, and a paved 2 kilometre promenade borders the northern and eastern borders of the lake. One can easily walk the 3 km around the lake by walking on the paved walkway and the connecting streets. The lake continues to be spring fed and drains into the Brampton underground water control system at the northeast end of the lake. The city stocks the lake with a variety of fish species.

In August 1998, the lake was temporarily closed after a local angler caught a rogue piranha in the lake. After a full survey of the lake, it was concluded that an aquarium piranha had been released into the lake. Piranhas are tropical fish and it could not have survived a Canadian winter when the water temperature plummeted.

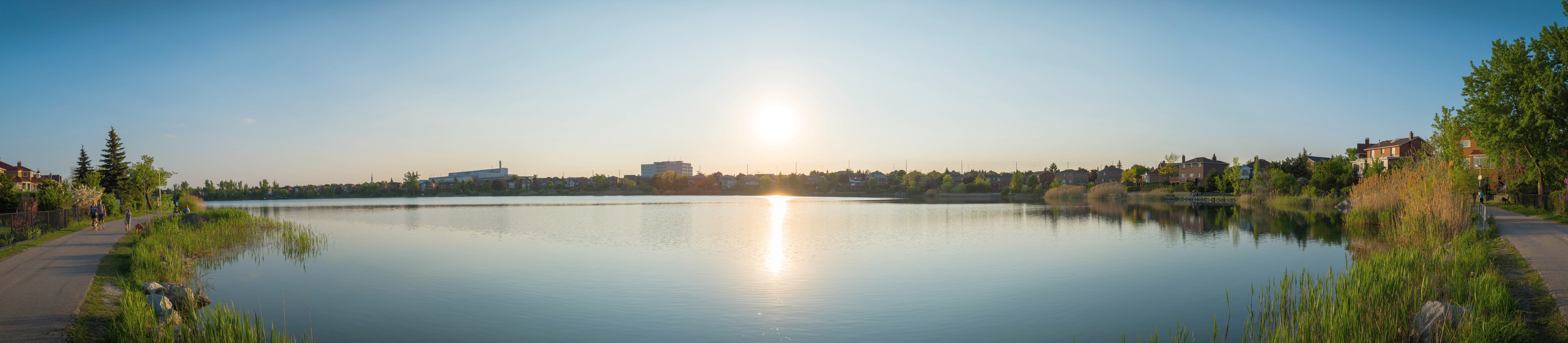
Professor's Lake
