= Coleraine, Ontario =

Coleraine
- Unincorporated rural community
- Location of Olivet in Canada Coleraine (Southern Ontario)
- Coordinates: 43°49′13″N 79°40′47″W
- Country: Canada
- Province: Ontario
- Regional municipality: Peel
- Time zone: UTC-5 (Eastern (EST))
  - Summer (DST): UTC-4 (EDT)
- GNBC Code: FASFJ

Coleraine is an unincorporated rural community in Brampton, Peel Region, Ontario, Canada. It is at the intersection of Major Mackenzie and Highway 50, bordering Vaughan.

== History ==
Coleraine was founded in the 1830s. The settlement's name may be derived from the names of two families who settled in the area, the Cole family and the Raines family. The Cole family built a house in the area, and Thomas Cole Jr. served as township councillor from 1863 to 1874.

The settlement had a post office from 1852 to 1916.

The now-extinct Coleraine Wesleyan Methodist Church and its cemetery, Coleraine Burying Grounds, were located west of the settlement. A cairn was erected at the former cemetery by the Town of Vaughan in 1981.

== Government ==
The area is served by two city wards:

- north of Major Mackenzie by Ward 1
- south of Major Mackenzie by Ward 2
