= Brampton Canadettes Easter Tournament =

Canadian hockey tournament

Brampton Canadettes Easter Tournament is an annual 3 1/2 day tournament for women's and girls' hockey teams. It has been held every year since 1967 and is hosted by the Brampton Canadettes in Brampton, Ontario. It bills itself as "The World's Largest Female Hockey Tournament". Teams of all ages and categories compete. Teams from across Canada and the United States and from as far as England, Switzerland, Japan, Kazakhstan and Russia attend this international tournament.

Including championship finals, over 600 games are played. Each team competes in a minimum of three games each over the course of the tournament. There is no limit on the number of teams in a division. Thousands of players and spectators attend the tournament each year.

The Intermediate AA and Midget AA divisions are highly scouted by local and American colleges and universities seeking recruits for varsity teams.
