= Michael Bailey (Canadian football) =

Canadian football player (born 1982)

Profile
- Positions: Offensive lineman, Defensive tackle

Personal information
- Born: October 11, 1982 (age 44); Brampton, Ontario, Canada
- Listed height: 6 ft 7 in (2.01 m)
- Listed weight: 276 lb (125 kg)

Career information
- University: Mount Allison

Career history
- 2006–2007: Toronto Argonauts*
- * Offseason or practice squad member only
- Stats at CFL.ca (archive)

Michael Bailey (born October 11, 1982) is a Canadian former professional football player with the Toronto Argonauts of the Canadian Football League (CFL).

== Early life ==
In September 2002, he enrolled at Mount Allison University, studying English while playing for both the Mount Allison Mounties football and basketball teams. In 2003, he was named an Atlantic University Sport All-Star and named the Mounties' most improved player, recording 36 tackles in 8 games. In 2005, he was selected to compete in the CIS football East West Bowl.

== Professional career ==
Bailey attended the 2006 CFL Evaluation Camp and though he went undrafted in the 2006 CFL draft, his performance was impressive enough that he was signed by the Toronto Argonauts as a free agent on May 12, 2006, and dressed in both pre-season games versus Hamilton as a backup offensive lineman, backup defensive tackle, and played on special teams. He was assigned to the practice roster at the beginning of the regular season, where he remained until he returned for his final season at Mount Allison on July 29.

He re-signed with the Argonauts on January 3, 2007, but was released at the end of training camp on June 23, 2007.
