= Evergreen College (Canada) =

College in Alberta, Canada

- Motto: Preparing Professionals for the Real World
- Type: Private Career College
- Established: 2002
- Location: Greater Toronto Area & Calgary, Ontario & Alberta, Canada
- Website: www.evergreencollege.ca

Evergreen College is a Canadian private career college with campus locations in Downtown Toronto, Brampton, Markham, Mississauga, Oakville, Scarborough and Calgary, Alberta. The college provides training in the areas of business, health care, hospitality, social work, and technology. Evergreen College combines in-class learning with field placements in their accelerated programs. The college accepts both Canadian and international students.

== History ==
Evergreen College began as a vocational college in 2002 in Toronto, Ontario. It has since expanded to include multiple campuses in the Greater Toronto Area, specifically in Brampton, Downtown Toronto, Markham, Mississauga, Oakville, and Scarborough. In 2014, Evergreen College opened a campus in Calgary, Alberta.

== Accreditation ==
Evergreen College is registered as a private career college under the Private Career Colleges Act, 2005. Evergreen College is also a member of the National Association of Career Colleges (NACC) and Career Colleges Ontario (CCO). Certain programs offered at Evergreen College are affiliated with other institutes and curricula (see programs).

== Campuses ==
Evergreen College has campuses in Downtown Toronto, Brampton, Markham, Mississauga, Oakville, Scarborough and Calgary, Alberta.

== Services ==
Evergreen College provides financial services to its students. The college offers services connecting students with Student Aid Alberta, and it offers multiple payment options to students. Evergreen College also provides career services to its students; resume-writing workshops, interview workshops, job search databases, and career consultation are available. Career services are included in each program. The Calgary campus offers a shuttle service to its students. The shuttle services the nearby Whitehorn LRT stations, picking up and dropping off students for their classes.

== Community impact ==
Since its acceptance of international students, Evergreen College has had a large impact on immigrants settling in Canada. Many international students have chosen the college to attend in order to study Canadian programs. Evergreen College has become involved with the Centre for Newcomers in Calgary adding to its impact on immigrant communities. Evergreen College Calgary also provides its campus as a meeting space for various events and groups such as the Amiga Users of Calgary.

== See also ==
- List of colleges in Ontario
- List of colleges in Alberta
- List of universities and colleges in Alberta
- Higher education in Ontario
- Higher education in Alberta
