= Gage Park, Brampton =

Municipal park in Brampton, Ontario, Canada

Gage Park
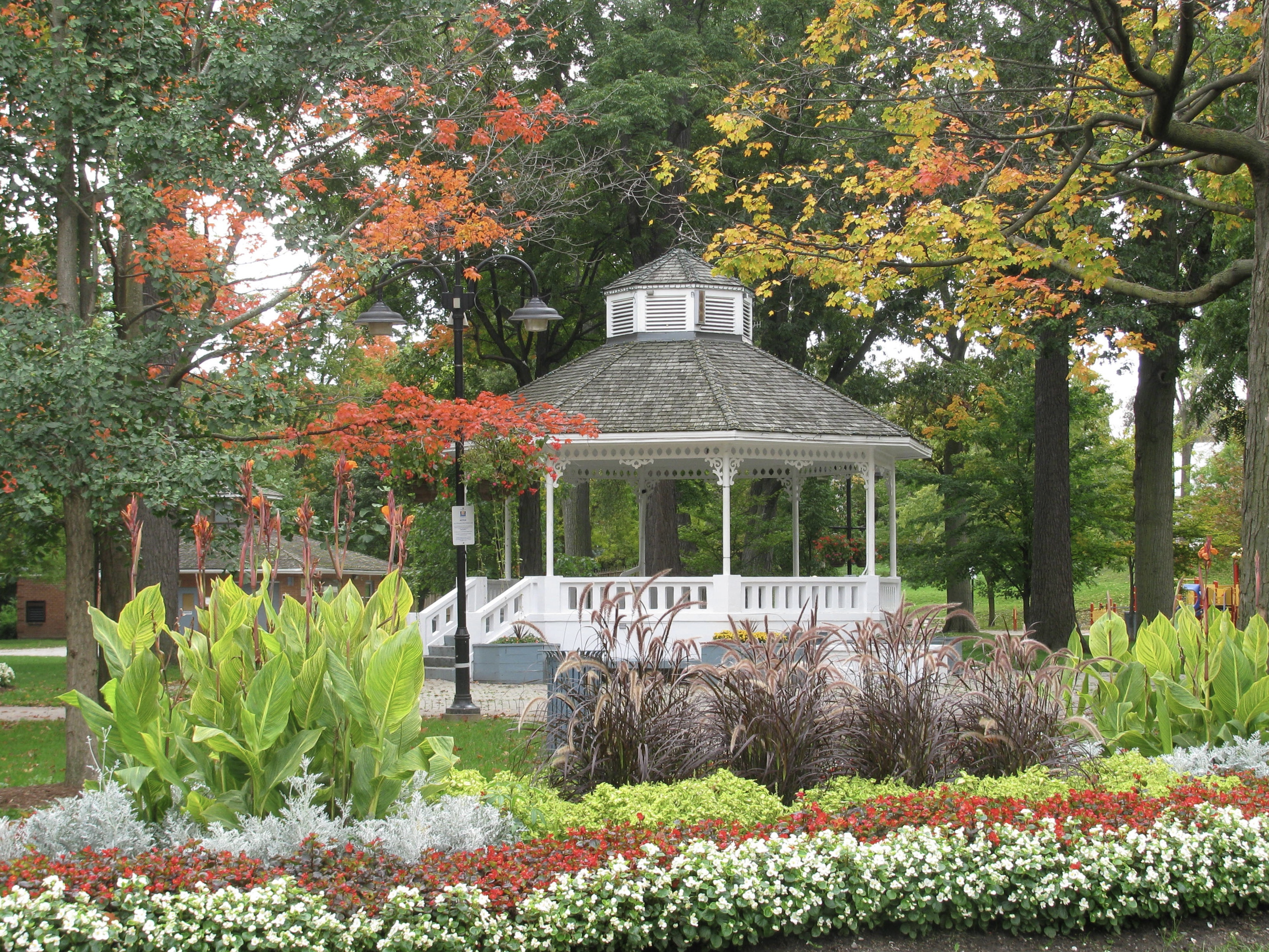
- Gage Park in October 2009
- Interactive map of Gage Park
- Type: Urban park
- Location: Brampton, Ontario
- Coordinates: 43.6833°N 79.7578°W
- Created: 1903
- Operator: City of Brampton
- Open: Open all year
- Parking: Nearby street parking, and parking garage beneath City Hall

Gage Park is an urban park in Brampton, Ontario, Canada. It is Brampton's oldest municipal park, originally opened in 1903. The park offers floral gardens, a gazebo, large trees, a fountain, trails for rollerblading and jogging, a children's play area, a Splash pad (formerly a wading pool), and summer evening concerts. Ice skating on the temperature-controlled skating trail is a popular wintertime activity.

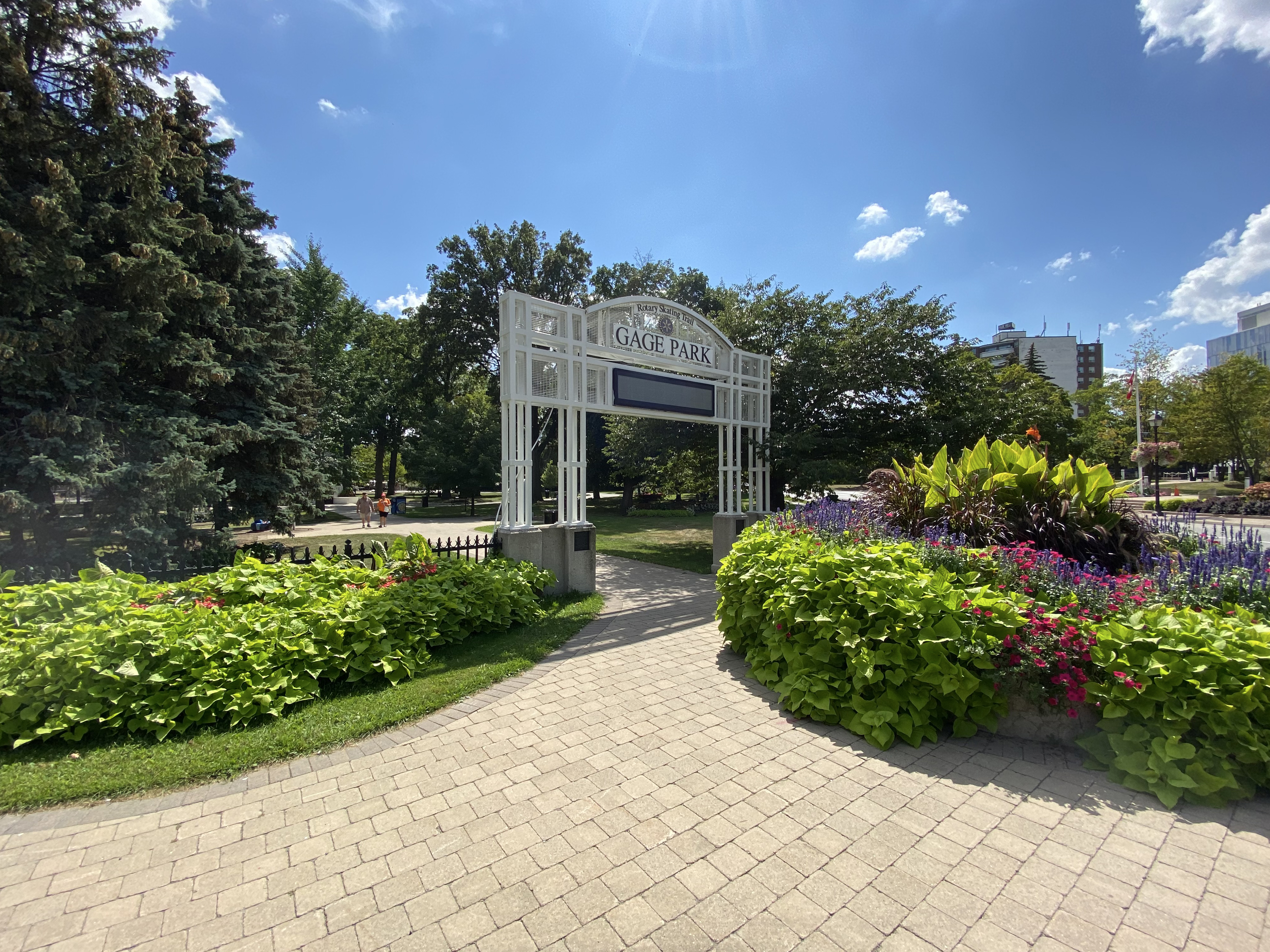
Gage Park Entrance in Summer, 2021

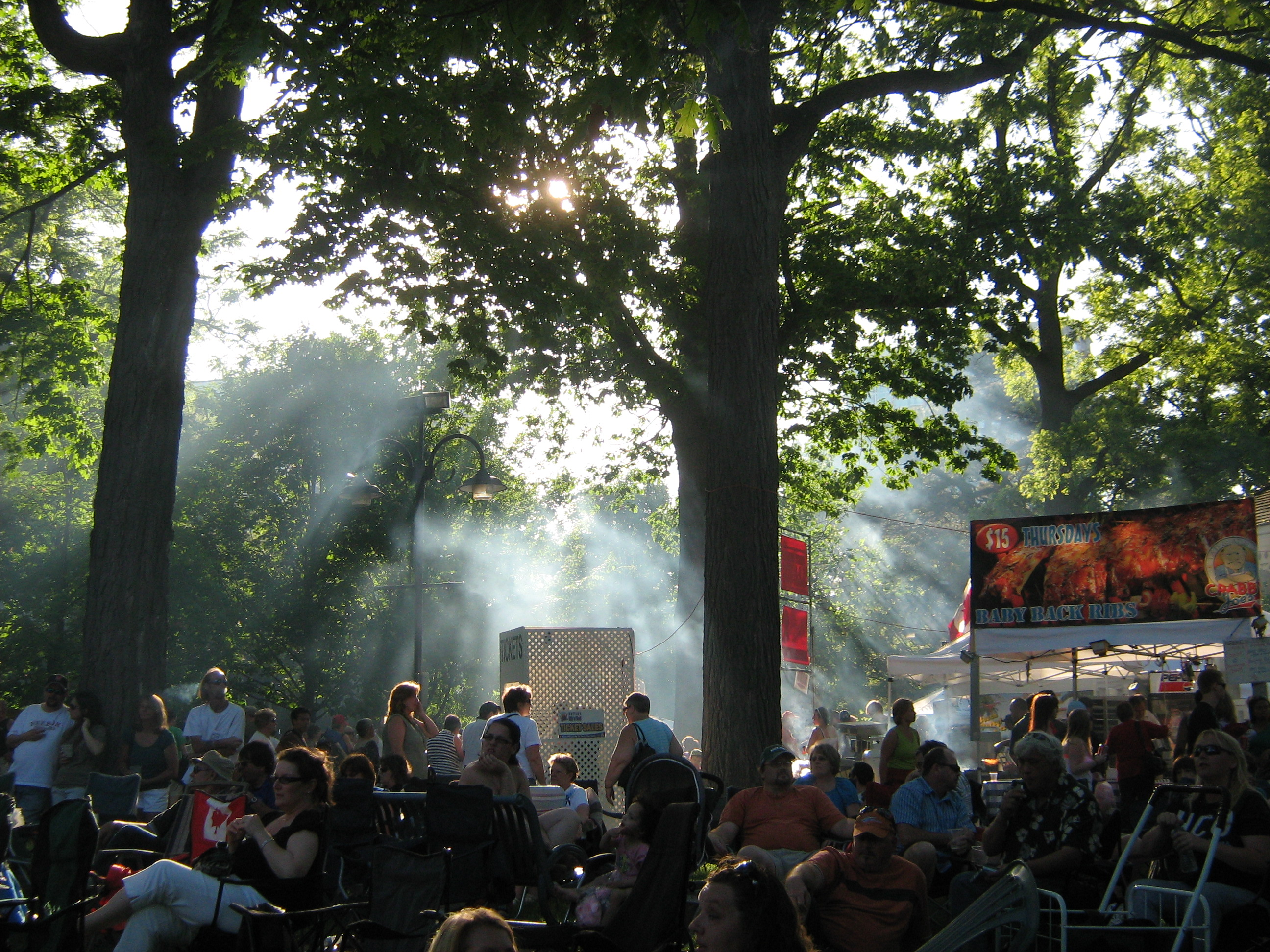
Brampton Rotary Club's Rib'nRoll 2010

== History ==
For many years, Brampton survived without a public park. Public celebrations and large gatherings were either held at the Fair Grounds on Elliott Street or on the Athletic Grounds at Rosalea Park, but both were considered by residents to be far from the centre of town and lacked the shade of trees.

In 1902, Sir William J. Gage (owner of Gage Publishing, a publishing house specializing in school text books) purchased a 3.25 acres (1.3 hectares) part of the gardens and lawns of the Alder Lea estate (now called Alderlea) that had been built on Main Street by Kenneth Chisolm in 1867 to 1870. (Chisholm, a merchant and founding father of Brampton, had been the Town reeve, then warden of Peel County, then MPP for Brampton and eventually, Registrar of Peel County.) Sir William donated 1.7 acres (0.7 hectares) of the property to the town, with a specific condition that it be made into a park. Citizens donated $1,054 and the town used the funds to purchase extra land to ensure a larger park.

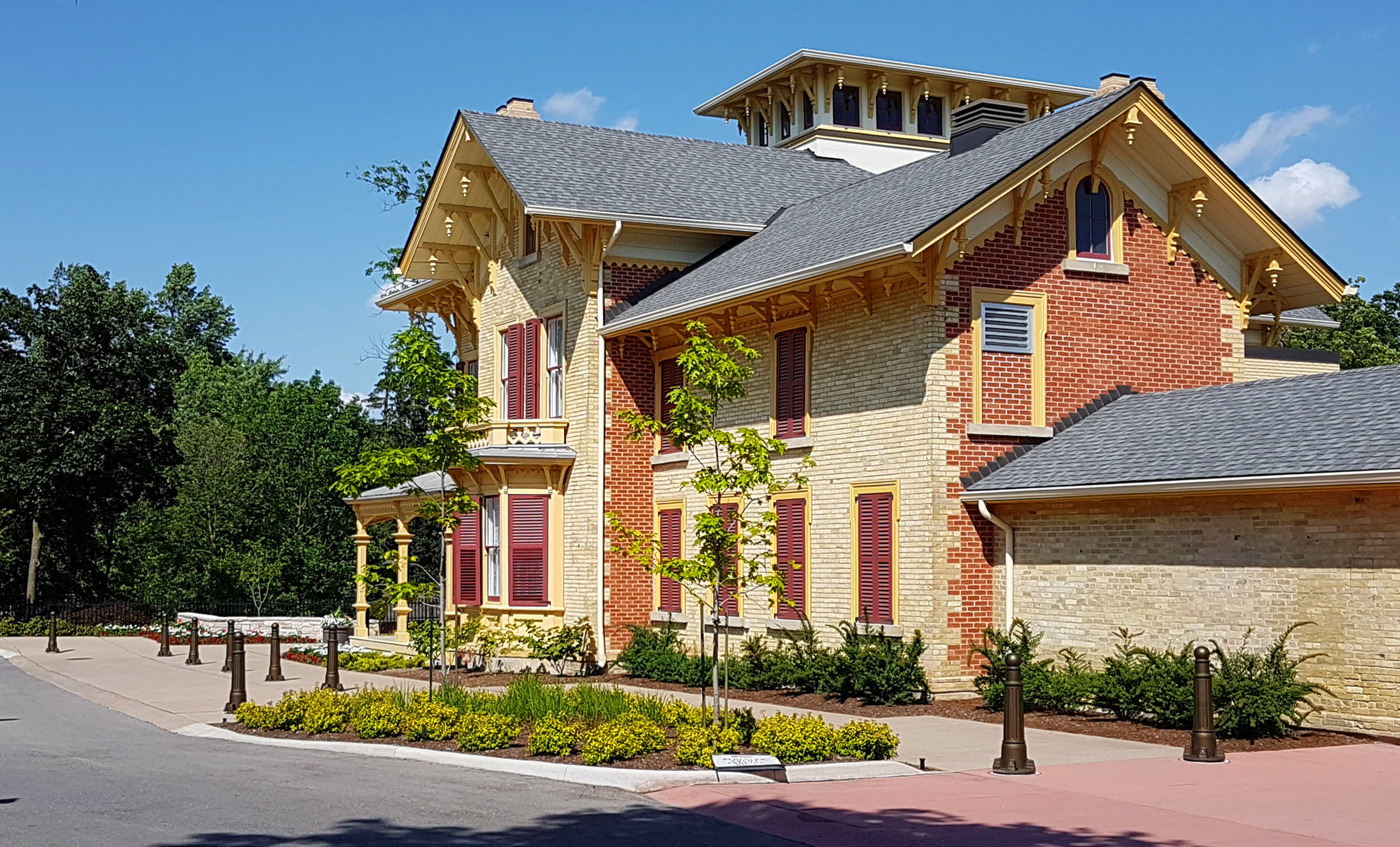
The Alderlea mansion, part of the original Alderlea Estate, whose Main Street frontage property became part of Gage Park.

A park committee was appointed, consisting of members of the town council. Many trees were removed, gravelled walkways were prepared, all underbrush was removed and the land was levelled and seeded. W.J. Gage opened the park, the first municipal park in Brampton, on Dominion Day (Canada Day), 1903. Over the following years, a bandstand was erected and the Horticultural Society volunteered to properly label all the trees for the information of the general public.

In 1955, the Kinsmen’s Club of Brampton added a wading pool, and in 1971 Brampton received the Flower Fountain from Benson and Hedges Tobacco Company. The Rotary Club of Brampton’s long-standing support of the park has seen the realization of many projects including swings in 1946, and the skating trail and entranceway with digital signage in the 1990s.

The City of Brampton purchased Alderlea as part of its sesquicentennial and started major renovations and an expansion in 2010. Stairs connect Alderlea to Gage Park.

== Location ==
Gage Park is located immediately south-west of the intersection of Main St. S. and Wellington St. West in the historic downtown of Brampton, south of Brampton's City Hall. Street parking is available nearby, in addition to frequently free underground parking beneath City Hall.

== Features ==
=== Skating trail ===
Ice skating on the temperature-controlled skating trail is a popular wintertime activity. Skating is open from 10 a.m. to 10 p.m. Sunday through Thursday, and 10 a.m. to 11 p.m. on Fridays and Saturdays. Skate rental and sharpening services are located at Shoe Clinic nearby.

=== Veterans monument ===
The Veteran was carved in 2005 from the trunk of a dying red oak that had stood for over a century. It was created to mark the Year of the Veteran in Canada. Carved by artist Jim Menken, the statue was modelled in the image of Bill Bettridge, a decorated veteran of the Second World War and survivor of Operation Overlord (the D-Day landings in Normandy, France) that led to the end of the war. It stands in silent tribute to the many men and women of Brampton who served – and continue to serve – Canada in wars, conflicts, and peacekeeping missions around the world.
