= A. Grenville and William Davis Courthouse =

Courthouse in Ontario, Canada

Coordinates: 43°39′40″N 79°43′33″W

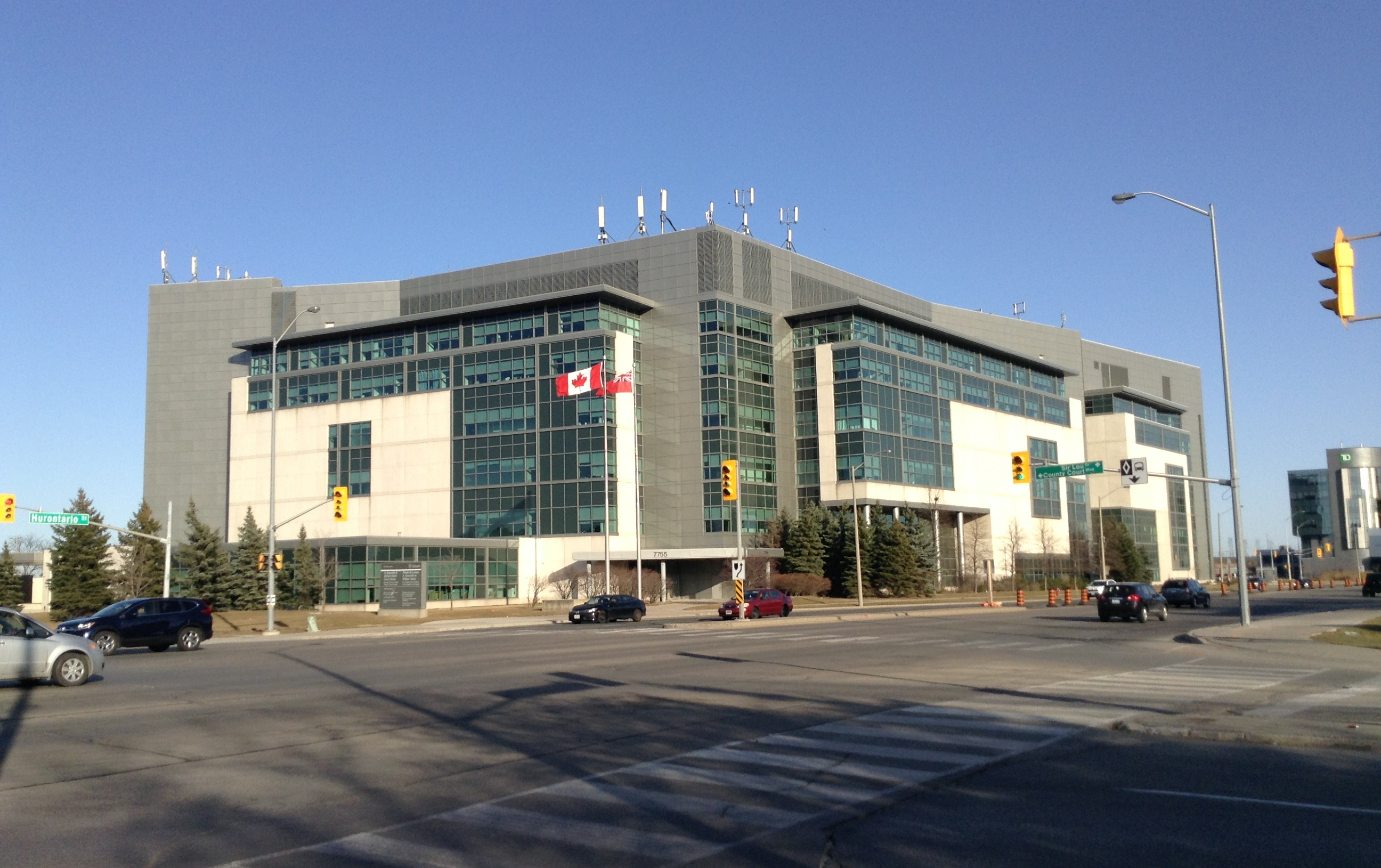
A. Grenville & William Davis Courthouse

The A. Grenville and William Davis Courthouse opened in 2000, and is located at 7755 Hurontario Street in Brampton, Ontario, Canada.

The court house is named in honour of Albert Grenville Davis QC, former Peel lawyer and his son William Grenville Davis, lawyer and former Premier of Ontario. It was designed by Zeidler Partnership Architects of Toronto.

It was built to amalgamate several smaller Peel Region courthouses and the extensive library of the Peel Law Association into one building. The building houses branches of the Ontario Superior Court of Justice and the Ontario Court of Justice. There are 50 courtrooms on floors one to four and 38 jail cells attached to the Sally port in the basement.

== 2014 shooting ==
On Friday March 28, 2014 at approximately 11 a.m. Charnjit Bassi entered the courthouse and attempted to bypass the metal detectors in the lobby by walking through the designated lawyers and staff entrance, resulting in an altercation with a Peel Regional Police officer. Bassi pulled a handgun and shot six times, wounding the officer in the abdomen. Two other officers returned fire, fatally killing Bassi. Peel Police believe Charnjit Bassi was targeting someone he believed to be present in the courthouse at the time. Bassi had no outstanding charges and was not scheduled to appear at the courthouse on the day of the incident. The courthouse was placed under lockdown for several hours after the incident occurred and all legal proceedings that were to take place that day were cancelled following the shooting.

== High profile trials ==
- the murder of Mauricio Castro, a high-profile Canadian cocaine trafficker, murder near the centre court of Square One Shopping Centre in Mississauga.

== See also ==
- Peel County Courthouse and Jail
