= Peel Regional Council =

Governing body in Ontario, Canada

Type
- Type: Upper-tier municipal council
- Term limits: None

History
- New session started: November 16, 2026

Leadership
- Chair of the Region of Peel: Nando Iannicca

Structure
- Seats: 25
- Length of term: 4 years

Elections
- Last election: October 26, 2026 (24 seats)

Meeting place
- 10 Peel Centre Drive; Brampton, Ontario

Website
- region.peel.on.ca/council

Peel Regional Council is the governing body of the Regional Municipality of Peel, Ontario, Canada.

== Formation ==
Peel Council was formed in 1973 when the Regional Municipality of Peel was created to replace the old Peel County. It was created by the province to deal with counties with significant growth patterns. It is supposed to mimic the role of the former Metro Toronto Council.

== Political Structure ==
It currently consists of 25 members: the mayors of Mississauga, Brampton, and Caledon, eleven councillors from Mississauga, six councillors from Brampton, four additional councillors from Caledon, and the regional chair, who is appointed by council members. These members are elected via double direct election.

- Caledon Councillors Wards 1-6 and Mayor
- Brampton Councillors Wards 1-10 and Mayor
- Mississauga Councillors Wards 1-11 and Mayor

A list of past and present chair (or chairmen of Peel Council):

- 1973-1979 Chairman Lou H. Parsons (GO Transit Chair and Mississauga City Councillor)
- 1979-1991 Chairman R. Frank Bean (former Mississauga City Alderman)
- 1981 Acting Chairman Peter Robertson (Mayor of Brampton)
- 1991 Acting Chairman Frank Russell (Brampton)
- 1991 Acting Chairman Edward (Ted) Southorn (Mississauga Ward 7 Councillor)
- 1991 Acting Chairman Rhoda Begley (Regional Councillor and Brampton City Councillor)
- 1992-2014 Chairman Emil Kolb (former Mayor of Caledon)
- 2014-2018 Chair Frank Dale (former Mississauga Ward 4 Councillor)
- 2018–present Chair Nando Iannicca (former Mississauga Ward 7 Councillor)

Wards

The Peel wards are based on the ward system of each city, so there are repeated ward numbers:

- Caledon Wards 1-4 and Mayor
- Brampton Wards 1-10 and Mayor
- Mississauga Wards 1-11 and Mayor

== County Buildings/Peel Centre ==
- 1973-1980 - Peel County Courthouse, Brampton, Ontario
- 1980–present - 10 Peel Centre Drive in Brampton, Ontario.

In 2014, the inaugural meeting of council met at Mississauga Convention Centre.

In 2018, the inaugural meeting of council met at 10 Peel Centre Drive Council Chambers

== Services ==
- Peel Regional Police
- Peel Health Services
  - Peel Regional Paramedic Services
  - long-term care facilities
- Social Services
  - Child Care Centres
  - Ontario Works
  - Volunteer workers
- Public Works
  - Transhelp
  - Regional Road and maintenance
  - Water/Wastewater system
  - Construction
  - Garbage disposal - collected from the cities and towns in Peel
- Education
  - Peel District School Board
  - Dufferin-Peel Catholic District School Board
- Public Housing

== Current Council ==
Council elected in the 2026 municipal election:

Regional Councillor	Municipality	Notes
Frank Dale	Mississauga	Regional Chair
Allan Thompson	Caledon	Mayor of Caledon
Johanna Downey	Caledon	Caledon Ward 2 Councillor
Annette Groves	Caledon	Caledon Ward 5 Councillor
Jennifer Innis	Caledon	Caledon Wards 3 & 4 Councillor
Ian Sinclair	Caledon	Caledon Ward 1 Councillor
Patrick Brown	Brampton	Mayor of Brampton
Rowena Santos	Brampton	Brampton Wards 1 & 5 Councillor
Martin Medeiros	Brampton	Brampton Wards 3 & 4 Councillor
Pat Fortini	Brampton	Brampton Wards 7 & 8 Councillor
Paul Vicente	Brampton	Brampton Wards 1 & 5 Councillor
Michael Palleschi	Brampton	Brampton Wards 2 & 6 Councillor
Gurpreet Singh Dhillon	Brampton	Brampton Wards 9 & 10 Councillor
Alvin Tedjo	Mississauga	Mayor of Mississauga
Brad Butt	Mississauga	Mississauga Ward 11 Councillor
Stephen Dasko	Mississauga	Mississauga Ward 1 Councillor
Chris Fonseca	Mississauga	Mississauga Ward 3 Councillor
Lucas Alves	Mississauga	Mississauga Ward 7 Councillor
John Kovac	Mississauga	Mississauga Ward 4 Councillor
Matt Mahoney	Mississauga	Mississauga Ward 8 Councillor
Sue McFadden	Mississauga	Mississauga Ward 10 Councillor
Natalie Hart	Mississauga	Mississauga Ward 5 Councillor
Tom Ellard	Mississauga	Mississauga Ward 2 Councillor
Martin Reid	Mississauga	Mississauga Ward 9 Councillor
Joe Horneck	Mississauga	Mississauga Ward 6 Councillor

=== Past Councils ===
Council elected in the 2010 municipal election:

Regional Councillor	Municipality	Notes
Emil Kolb		Regional Chair (1991 - 2014)
Hazel McCallion	Mississauga	Mayor (1978 - 2014)
Jim Tovey	Mississauga (Port Credit)	
Patricia Mullin	Mississauga (Clarkson, Lorne Park)	VP of Peel Housing Corporation
Chris Fonseca	Mississauga (Rathwood, Applewood)	Management Committee Vice-chair
Frank Dale	Mississauga (City Centre)	Mississauga Ward 4 Councillor
Eve Adams	Mississauga (Britannia Woods, Malton)	Resigned in early 2011 to run in the 2011 federal election.
Bonnie Crombie	Mississauga (Britannia Woods, Malton)	Won by-election on September 19, 2011.
Ron Starr	Mississauga (Erindale)	Public Works Committee Vice-chair
Nando Iannicca	Mississauga (Cooksville)	
Katie Mahoney	Mississauga (Erin Mills)	
Pat Saito	Mississauga (Meadowvale)	
Sue McFadden	Mississauga (Lisgar, Churchill Meadows)	
George Carlson	Mississauga (Streetsville)	
Susan Fennell	Mayor	
Elaine Moore	Brampton (Ward 1 and 5)	Health Services Committee Chair
Paul Palleschi	Brampton (Ward 2 and 6)	Human Services Committee Chair and President of Peel Housing Corporation
John Sanderson	Brampton (Ward 3 and 4)	
Gael Miles	Brampton (Ward 7 and 8)	Human Services Committee Vice-chair
John Sprovieri	Brampton (Ward 9 and 10)	
Marolyn Morrison	Caledon	Mayor
Richard Paterak	Caledon (Ward 1)	Health Services Committee Vice-chair
Allan Thompson	Caledon (Ward 2)	Public Works Committee Chair
Richard Whitehead	Caledon (Ward 3 & 4)	Management Committee Chair
Patti Foley	Caledon (Ward 5)	

== Other Officials ==
=== Executive Leadership Team ===
As of August 2023:

- Gary Kent, Chief Administrative Officer
- Patricia Caza, Regional Solicitor and Commissioner of Legislative Services
- Kealy Dedman, Commissioner of Public Works
- Nancy Polsinelli, Commissioner of Health Services
- Sean Baird, Commissioner of Human Service
- Davinder Valeri, Chief Financial Officer and Commissioner of Corporate Services

== See also ==
- Greater Toronto Area
- Durham Regional Council
- York Regional Council
