= 10 Peel Centre Drive =

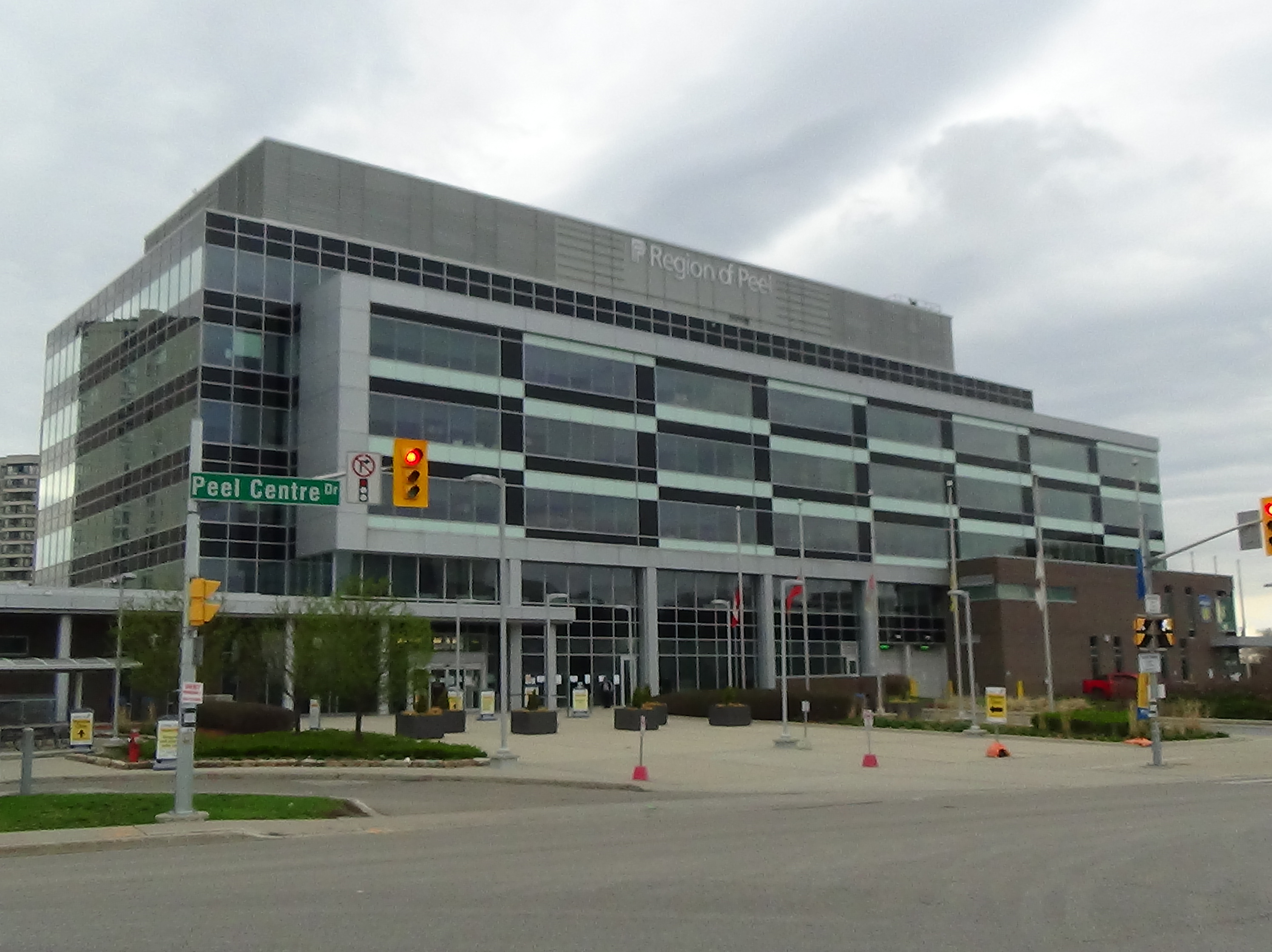
- Interactive map of the 10 Peel Centre Drive area

General information
- Location: 10 Peel Centre Dr., Brampton, Ontario, Canada
- Coordinates: 43.71928°N 79.72214°W
- Completed: 1980
- Renovated: 2008
- Owner: Regional Municipality of Peel

Technical details
- Floor count: 6

Website
- www.region.peel.on.ca/corpserv/10pcd-expansion/

10 Peel Centre Drive, is a building complex located at the intersection of Peel Center and Team Canada Drive in Brampton, Ontario. It serves as the seat of local government for the Regional Municipality of Peel. The building has been used for regional government offices since its completion in 1980 after relocating from the nearby historic Peel County Courthouse. It includes the Peel Regional Council chambers and the offices of the 21st division of the Peel Regional Police. Other regional departments are located at various buildings across Brampton, Mississauga, and Caledon.

The original building (Suite A) is a 6-storey brick structure built in 1980. The new annex (Suite B) is a 6-storey glass, steel and stone structure completed in 2008 which has an additional 200,000 sq ft (19,000 m^{2}) of office space. Division 21 (Suite C) is located on two floors with 30,000 sq ft (2,800 m^{2}) of space.
