= 2026 Peel Region municipal elections =

Municipal election in Ontario, Canada

2026 municipal elections in Peel Region
- October 26, 2026

Municipal elections took place across Ontario on October 26, 2026, including in the Region of Peel. An upper-tier municipality, Peel includes Brampton, Caledon, and Mississsauga.

== Brampton ==
The office of incumbent Mayor Patrick Brown confirmed on May 1 that he would run for re-election. Vidya Sagar Gautam, a candidate for the same position in the 2022 election, was the first to register. He has not registered as of June 19.

All five incumbents elected as city councillor, Rowena Santos (appointed as Regional councillor), Navjit Kaur Brar (appointed as Regional councillor), Dennis Keenan (appointed as Regional councillor), Rod Power and Harkirat Singh (promoted as deputy mayor) have registered for re-election.

Of the five incumbents elected as regional councillor, Paul Vicente, Michael Palleschi, Martin Medeiros, and Pat Fortini have registered for re-election. Gurpartap Singh Toor have not registered for re-election.

Brampton has five sets of two wards, each of which elects one Regional councillor and one City councillor. Two City councillors are chosen by the complete council, to serve as Regional councillors.

== Caledon ==
=== Mayor ===
Incumbent Caledon Mayor Annette Groves announced her retirement hours after an annual gala event, April 24. Her time in office began with service as an area councillor in 2000, elected as Regional councillor in 2003 and 2006, unsuccessfully ran for Mayor in 2010, returning to Regional council in 2014 and 2018, and elected as Mayor in 2022. Multiple media outlets cited controversies during her term as mayor.

On the first day of candidacy, Regional Councillor Christina Early registered as candidate for Mayor.

Registered candidates

- Christina Early
- Alan Hart
- Mario Russo
- Jagdeep Sacha
- Manjit Bhondhi Saini

Baljit Bawa withdrew on August 21.

==== Results ====
Candidate	Vote	%
Christina Early	12,650	54.64
Mario Russo	8,934	38.59
Alan Hart	840	3.63
Jagdeep Sacha	505	2.18
Manjit Bhondhi Saini	221	0.95

=== Area Council ===
==== Ward 1 ====
Lynn Kiernan, the incumbent for the ward, has decided to not seek re-election. She represented the ward for eight years.

All candidates replied to a survey by Caledon Enterprise.

Registered candidates

- Jeffrey Halsall, small business owner, who ran as an independent for Dufferin-Caledon in the 2025 provincial and federal elections
- Kate Hepworth, volunteer, retired EMS and fire dispatcher, who ran for the same ward in the 2022 municipal election
- Keri Parfitt, business owner, former environmental educator
- Aanya Shahi, employee of the Brampton CAO office
- Tom Sweeney, business owner, who ran for Regional councillor in 2018 and 2022

Candidate	Vote	%
Keri Parfitt	1,449	37.19
Tom Sweeney	1,296	33.26
Kate Hepworth	752	19.30
Aanya Shahi	287	7.37
Jeffrey Halsall	112	2.87

==== Ward 2 ====
The incumbent for the ward is Dave Sheen, who is running for regional council. All four candidates replied to a survey by Caledon Enterprise.

Registered candidates

- Yogi Chahal, realtor
- Hunar Kahlon, business owner, previously ran for council in 2022
- Rakesh Madhok, real estate broker, etc.
- Jagraj Sekhon, real estate broker, previously ran for council in 2022

Candidate	Vote	%
Jagraj Sekhon	2,455	43.85
Hunar Kahlon	1,672	29.87
Yogi Chahal	1,155	20.63
Rakesh Madhok	316	5.64

==== Ward 3 ====
Doug Maskell is incumbent for the ward, and Stan Cameron served as a school trustee for sixteen years.

Both candidates replied to a survey by Caledon Enterprise.

Registered candidates

- Stan Cameron, retired post-secondary educator, 18-year Peel District School Board trustee
- Doug Maskell, incumbent

Candidate	Vote	%
Stan Cameron	1,814	60.63
Doug Maskell (X)	1,178	39.37

==== Ward 4 ====
Nick de Boer, the incumbent for the ward, did not seek re-election. He represented the ward for 23 years.

Candidates Cheryl Connors, Heather French, and Paul Parete replied to a survey from Caledon Enterprise, but Pat Fortini did not.

Registered candidates

- Cheryl Connors, business owner
- Pat Fortini, a City of Brampton incumbent Regional councillor
- Heather French, business owner/farmer
- Paul Parete, physical scientist for Government of Canada

Candidate	Vote	%
Heather French	1,566	61.15
Cheryl Connors	670	26.16
Pat Fortini	247	9.64
Paul Parete	78	3.05

==== Ward 5 ====
The incumbent for the ward is Tony Rosa.

Registered candidates

- Anthony Caputo
- Diana Mollicone
- John Muir

Candidate	Vote	%
Diana Mollicone	2,495	53.31
Anthony Caputo	1,529	32.67
John Muir	656	14.02

==== Ward 6 ====
Registered candidates

- Cosimo Napoli, incumbent
- Carmela Palkowski, co-founder of Caledon Community Road Safety Advocacy Group

Candidate	Vote	%
Cosimo Napoli (X)	1,647	55.12
Carmela Palkowski	1,341	44.88

=== Regional Council ===
==== Wards 1, 2, 3 ====
The incumbent for the ward was Christina Early, who is running for Mayor of Caledon.

Registered candidates

- Harpreet Grewal
- Dave Sheen
- Mauro Testani, Ward 1 area councillor candidate in 2018, at which point he was described as a multiple business owner, active on parent councils

Candidate	Vote	%
Dave Sheen	7,037	56.26
Harpreet Grewal	2,873	22.97
Mauro Testani	2,599	20.78

==== Wards 4, 5, 6 ====
There is no incumbent for the ward, as Mario Russo is running for Mayor of Caledon. Tony Rosa was the only candidate registered for the election, as of the final day for registration, August 21, so he will be acclaimed.

- Tony Rosa, acclaimed

Candidate	Vote	%
Tony Rosa	Acclaimed	

== Mississauga ==
Incumbent mayor of Mississauga Carolyn Parrish has served in the role since winning the 2024 Mississauga mayoral by-election, prompted by the resignation of her predecessor Bonnie Crombie, and is seeking re-election. She is notably facing city councillors Alvin Tedjo and Dipika Damerla, as well as Crombie.

Additional candidates are Frank Fang, Olivia Gannon, Amjad Jilani, Mike Matulewicz, Fadi Naami, and David Shaw

If Tedjo and Damerla remain candidates for mayor, there will be a minimum of two new councillors for the new term. Incumbents Stephen Dasko and John Kovac are running unopposed, as of July 16. Incumbents Chris Fonseca, Natalie Hart, Joe Horneck, Matt Mahoney, Martin Reid, Sue McFadden, and Brad Butt all face candidates in their ridings.

== Trustees ==
=== English public, Brampton Wards 1, 5 ===
- Sufian Baig
- David Green, incumbent
- Kathy McDonald
- Stan Taylor

Amardeepsingh Saini registered and withdrew.

=== English public, Brampton Wards 2, 6 ===
- Chris Campbell
- Will Davies, incumbent
- Pal Dhaliwhal
- Jeannette Flynn
- Mansoor Mizra
- Shrutiben Shah
- Charanpreet Singh Sidhu

=== English public, Brampton Wards 3, 4 ===
Kathy McDonald, incumbent, has withdrawn to run in wards 1 and 5.

- Jot Dhaliwal, originally registered as Gurleenjot Singh Dhaliwal
- Claudio C. Lewis
- Arshei Nidha
- Celina Reyes

=== English public, Brampton Wards 7, 8 ===
- Karla Bailey, incumbent
- Brian James Blake
- Andrea Francis-Bucknor
- Michael Gyovai
- Jatin Sethi

=== English public, Brampton Wards 9, 10 ===
Satpaul Singh Johal is running for Regional councillor, Brampton wards 9 and 10, so there is no incumbent for this position.

- Daljit Singh
- Denise Dani
- Parneet Dhothar
- Dharmavir Gohil
- Therese Guidolin
- Muhammad Misbahul Haque
- Harsimran Singh
- Pankaj Joshi
- Mily Michael Macwan
- Khushpal Singh Pawar, candidate for school trustee in the same wards in 2022
- Gurinder Sehgal
- Gagandeep Sharma

Pushproop Brar registered and withdrew.

As a note on alphabeticization, Daljit Singh and Harsimran Singh both only have surnames.

=== English public, Mississauga Ward 1, 7 ===
- Charles Corey, previously in this election a candidate for English separate, Mississauga Ward 9, 10
- Jad El-Ghali
- Sara Iqbal
- Paul Pu
- Miles Roque
- Sariya Talat

=== English public, Mississauga Ward 2, 8 ===
- Tamer Elkateb
- Samantha Fung
- Brad MacDonald, incumbent
- Michael Michalias

=== English public, Mississauga Ward 3, 4 ===
The incumbent for this position is Lucas Alves.

- Vince Cerullo
- Kashaf Paracha
- Shivakumar Sethumadhavan

=== English public, Mississauga Ward 5 ===
- Susan Benjamin, incumbent
- Mohamed Elghamry
- Avtar Singh Ghotra
- Marina Qureshi, 2018 candidate for Ward 5 councillor

=== English public, Mississauga Wards 6, 11 ===
- Patrick Khrenaron Ma
- Jill Promoli, incumbent
- Harish Shroff
- Shashi Singh

=== English public, Mississauga Wards 9, 10 ===
- Mohanad Assal
- Jeff Clark, incumbent

=== English public, Caledon ===
Stan Cameron is running for Ward 3 area councillor in Caledon, so there is no incumbent in the race.

- Firdausi Homam
- Rosey Kaur
- Pamela McGugan
- Gagan Sandhu

=== English separate, Brampton 1, 3, 4 ===
- Amanda Baez
- Alfonso Menanno
- Anisha Thomas, incumbent

=== English separate, Brampton 2, 5, 6 ===
- Dominique Darmanin-Sturgeon
- Darryl Brian D'Souza, incumbent
- Damien Joseph

=== English separate, Brampton 7, 8, 9, 10 ===
- Andrea Baranowski
- Karen Dancy
- Shawn Xaviour, incumbent

Mary Xaviour was registered and withdrew on August 20, the day of Shawn's registration.

=== English separate, Mississauga Ward 1, 3 ===
- Mario Pascucci, incumbent

=== English separate, Mississauga Wards 2, 8 ===
- Lucita Gonsalves
- Herman Viloria, incumbent

=== English separate, Mississauga Ward 4 ===
- Stefano Pascucci, incumbent

=== English separate, Mississauga Ward 5 ===
- Sabir Masih
- Domenica Laura Simone
- Thomas Thomas, incumbent

Sabir Masih is also listed as having withdrawn August 20.

=== English separate, Mississauga Ward 6, 11 ===
- Luz del Rosario, incumbent

=== English separate, Mississauga Ward 7 ===
- Diana Carlesimo
- Bruno Iannicca, incumbent

=== English separate, Mississauga Ward 9, 10 ===
- Brea Corbet, incumbent
- Reshma Mathew
- Mathew Thomas

Charles Corey was a registered candidate, but withdrew to run for English public, Mississauga Wards 1 and 7.

=== English separate, Caledon ===
- Paula Dametto-Giovannozzi, incumbent

=== French public, Peel ===
- Mahmad Neezam Chutoo
- Pierre Gregory

=== French separate, Mississauga ===
- Jennifer Green Frank
- Sabir Masih

=== French separate, Caledon ===
- Genevieve Grenier
