= Peel County Courthouse =

Coordinates: 43.68491°N 79.75752°W

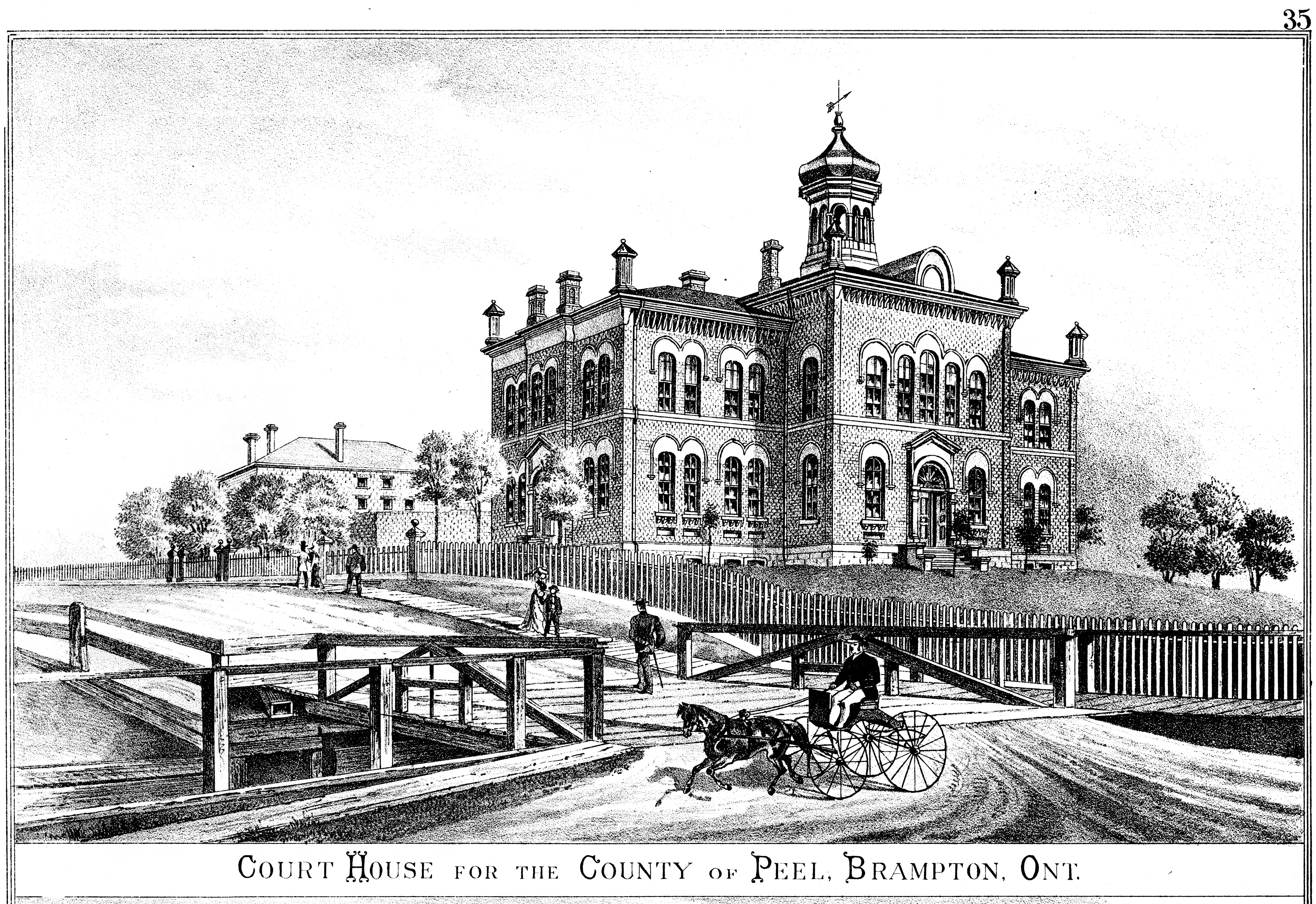
- Peel County Courthouse illustration, 1877
- Interactive map of the Peel County Courthouse area

General information
- Type: civic building, court house
- Architectural style: Classical, Italiante, Picturesque, and Gothic
- Location: Brampton
- Current tenants: Peel Art Gallery, Museum and Archives, formerly the Peel Heritage Complex
- Completed: January 1867
- Renovated: 1990s, 2010–2011
- Cost: $18,385
- Owner: Region of Peel
- Landlord: Region of Peel

Technical details
- Floor count: 3

Design and construction
- Architects: William Kauffmann, Toronto
- Quantity surveyor: Kestevan and Storey, Toronto

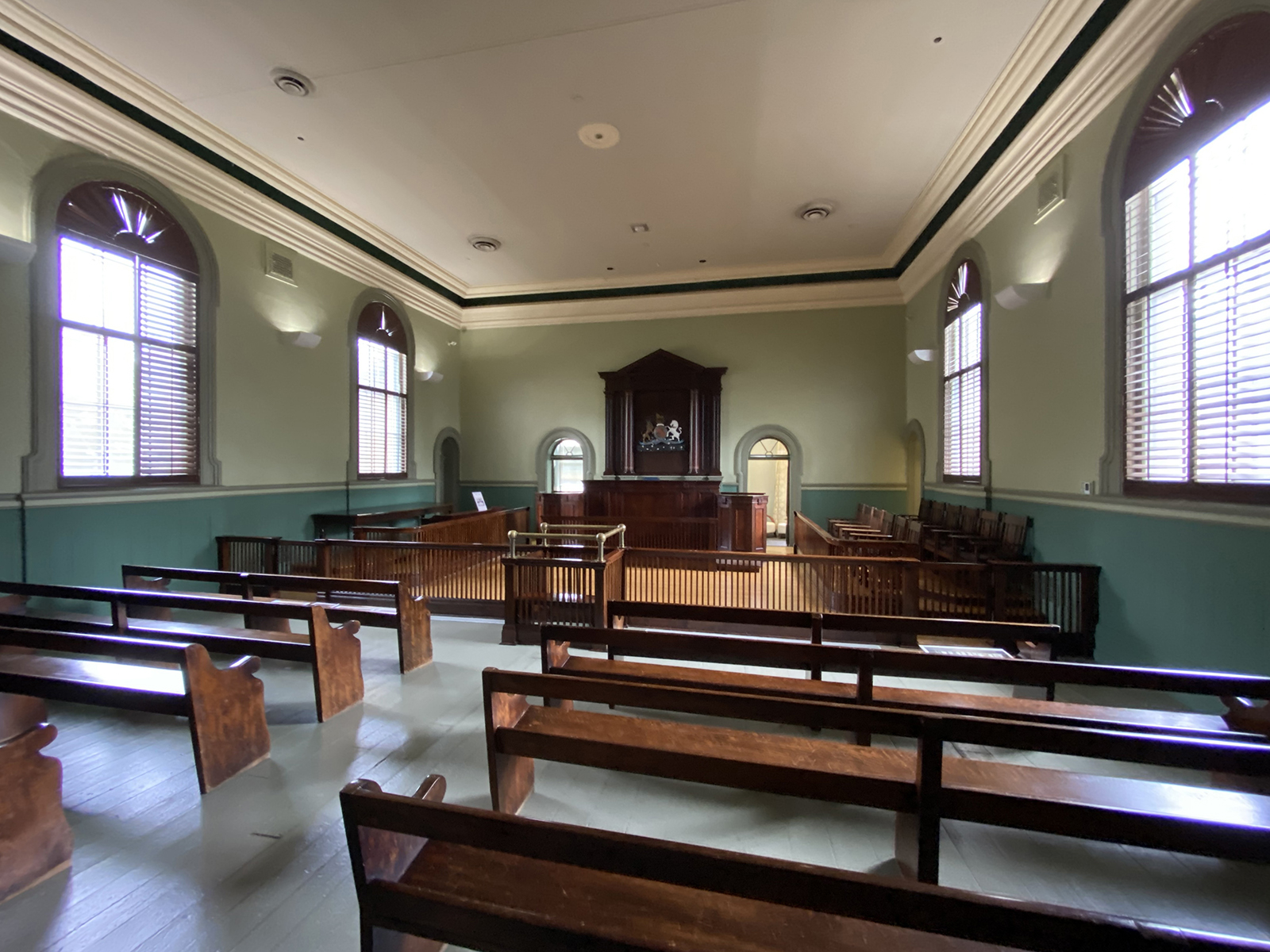
Interior of the courthouse

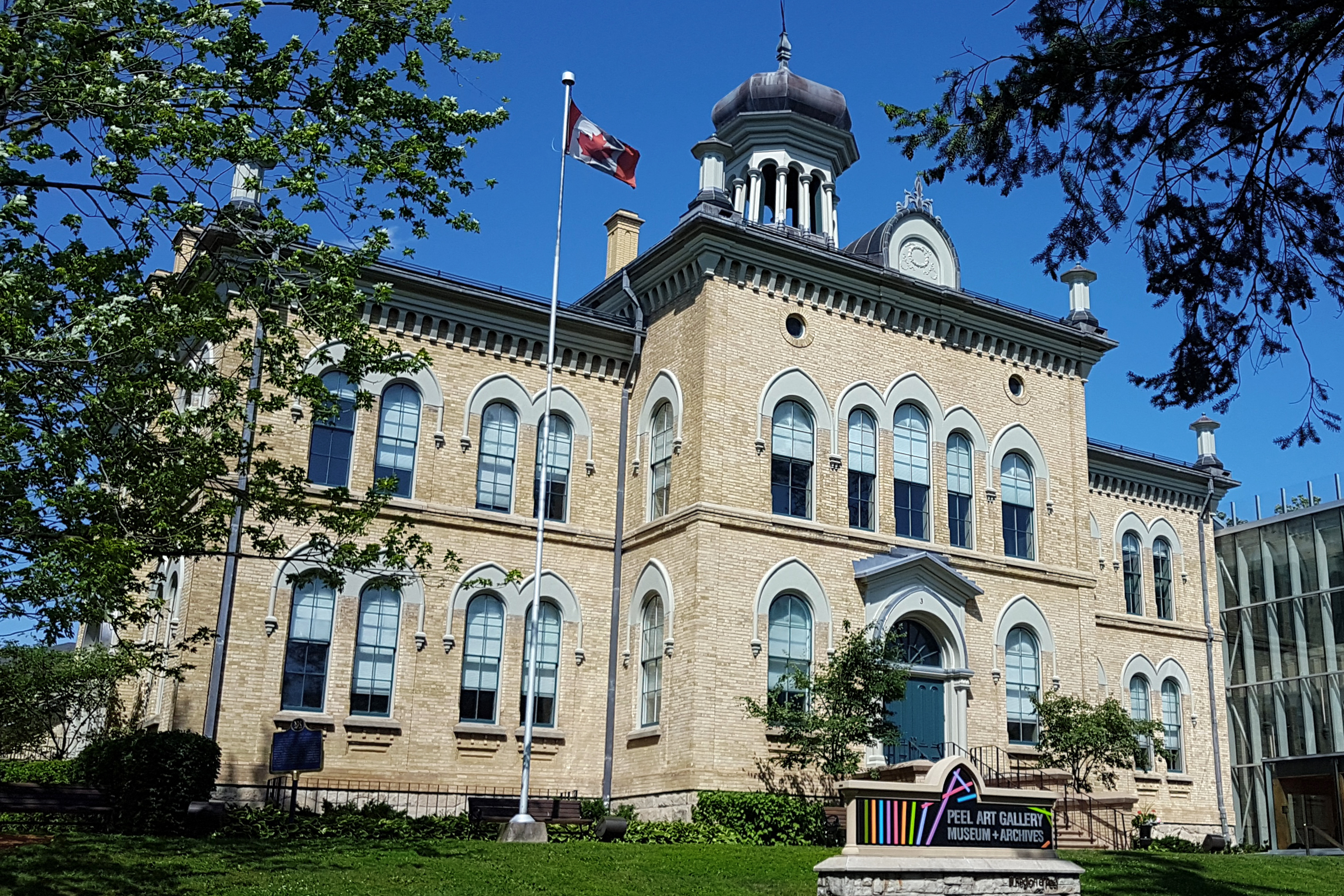
The building as seen today, part of the Peel Art Gallery, Museum and Archives.

Peel County Courthouse is a historic building located in Brampton, Ontario and served as a courthouse and jail for Peel County and Peel Region, as well as the first home of Peel Regional Council.

The two court house was built in a Venetian Gothic style in 1865–66 by architect William Kauffman and Peel County Council began sitting in 1867. A tower is located in the centre top of the building. A three-storey jail was added at the rear in 1867.

Peel County sat at the Courthouse until 1973 and then became home to Peel Regional Council from 1973 to 1980 (then moved to the 10 Peel Centre Drive). For a time, the Peel Museum and Art Gallery occupied the building, before the Peel County Jail and Registry Office were renovated to become the Peel Heritage Complex, now known as the Peel Art Gallery, Museum and Archives. Despite a renovation in the 1990s, the courthouse remained inaccessible to the public on a daily basis. After an extensive renovation, currently active, it will host staff offices, a board room, and the Art Gallery of Peel's public reference library. The Courtroom and Council Chamber will be available for rentals.

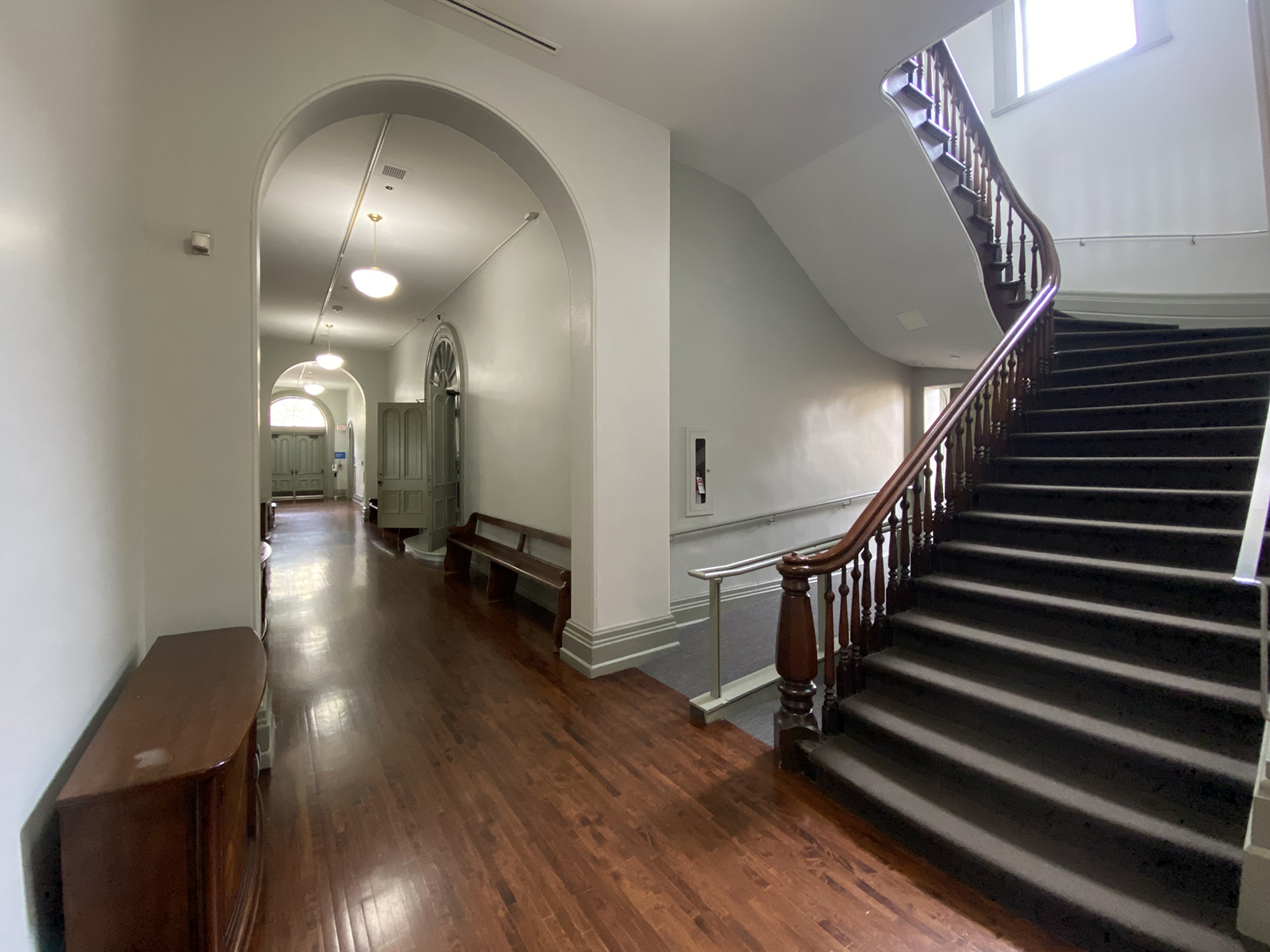
Level 1 Access

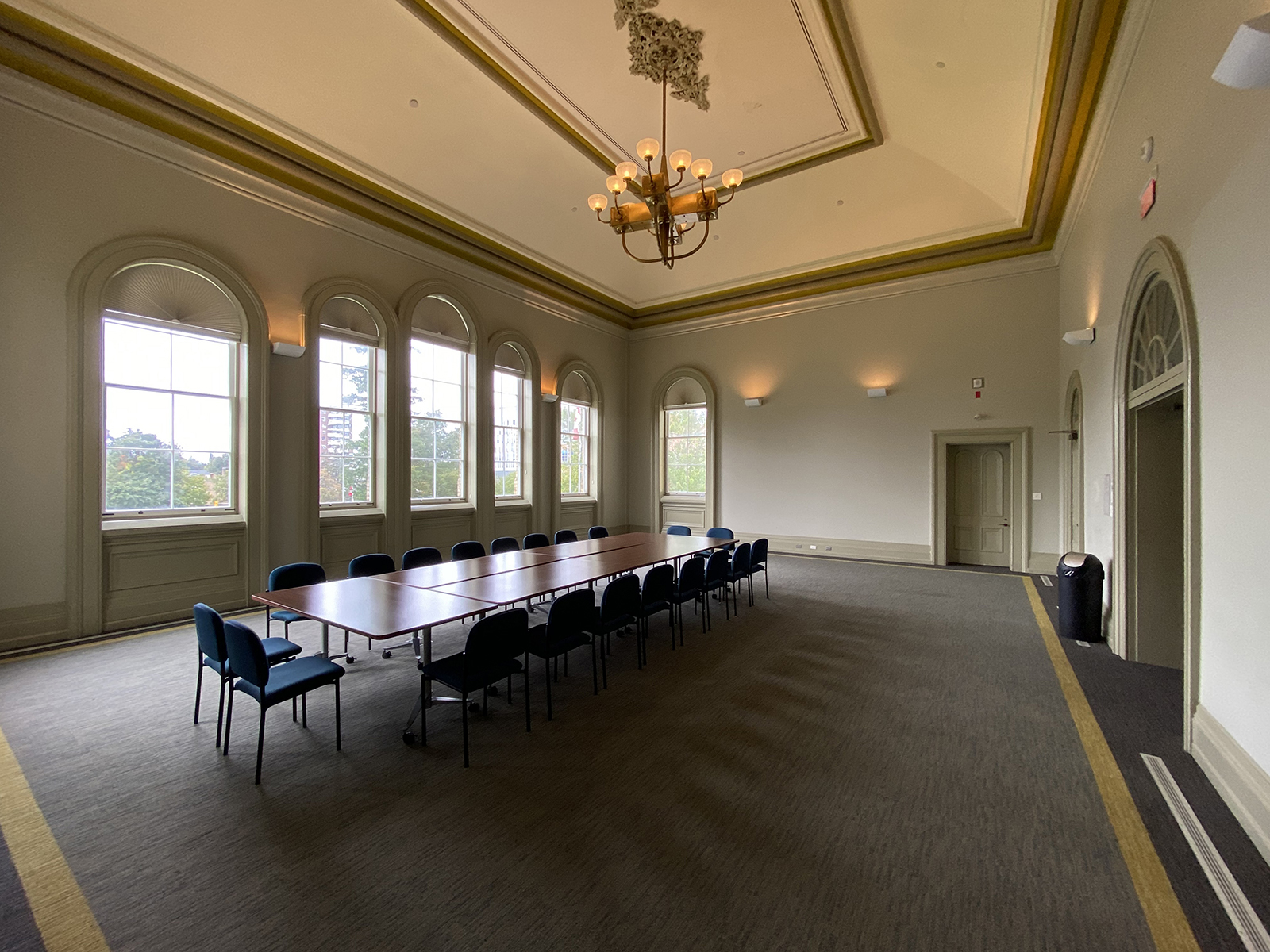
Level 2 Meeting Room

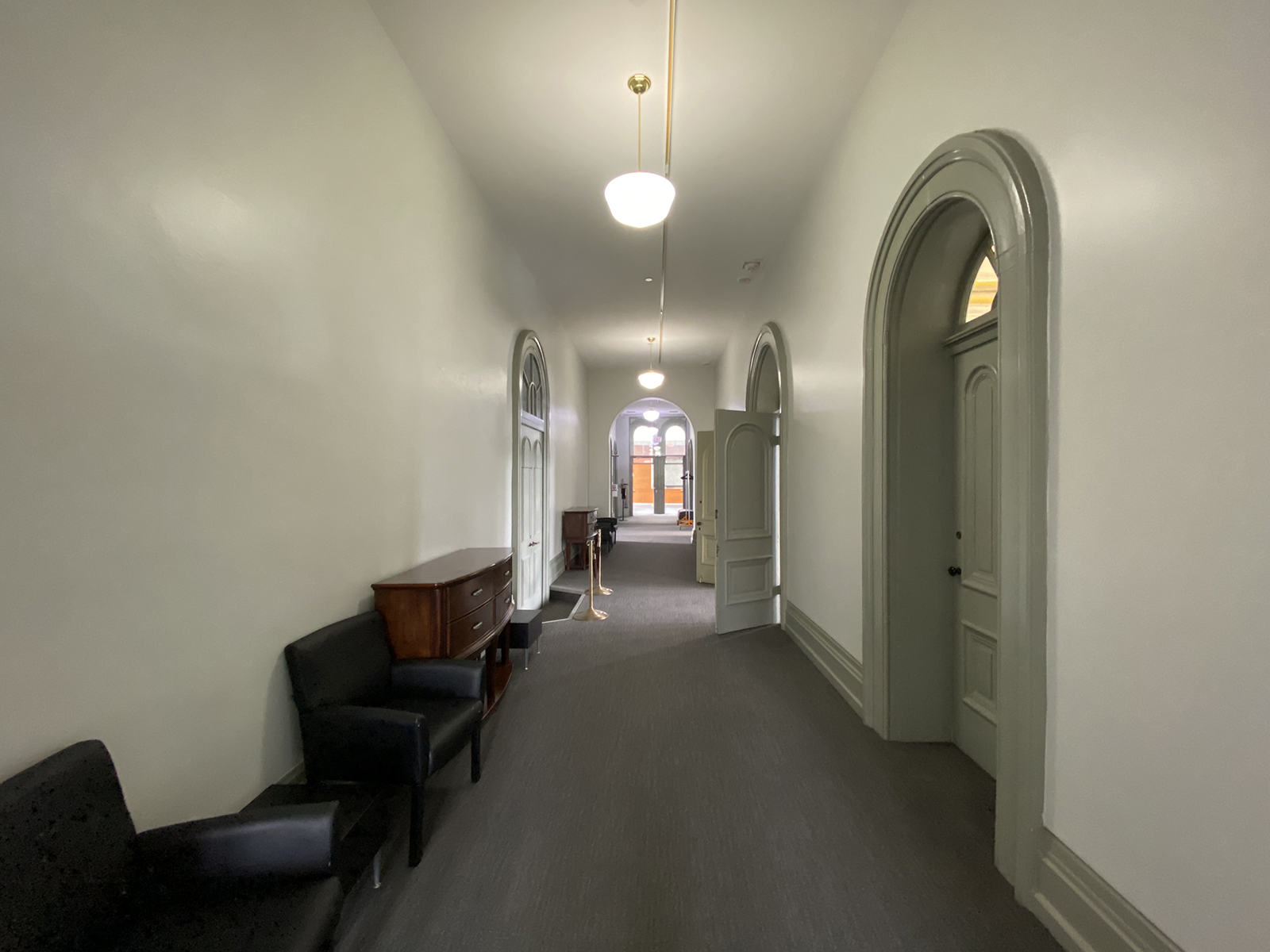
Level 2 Access

The building resumed operations as a courthouse in January 1984, for a trial run, due to backlog in the main facility.

== See also ==
- A. Grenville and William Davis Courthouse
