= Regional Municipality of Peel =

Regional municipality in Ontario, Canada

Peel Region
- Regional municipality (upper-tier)
- Regional Municipality of Peel
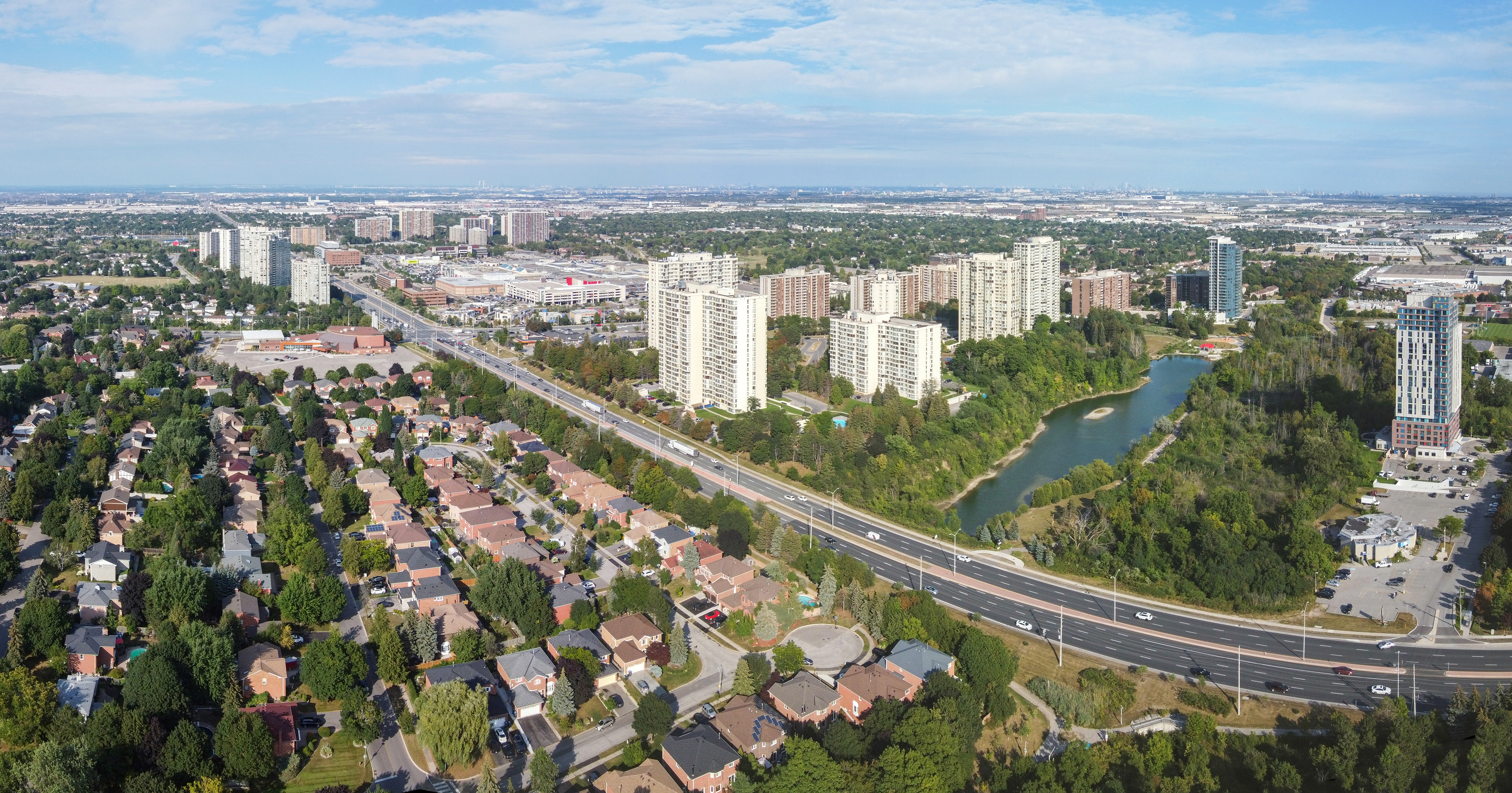
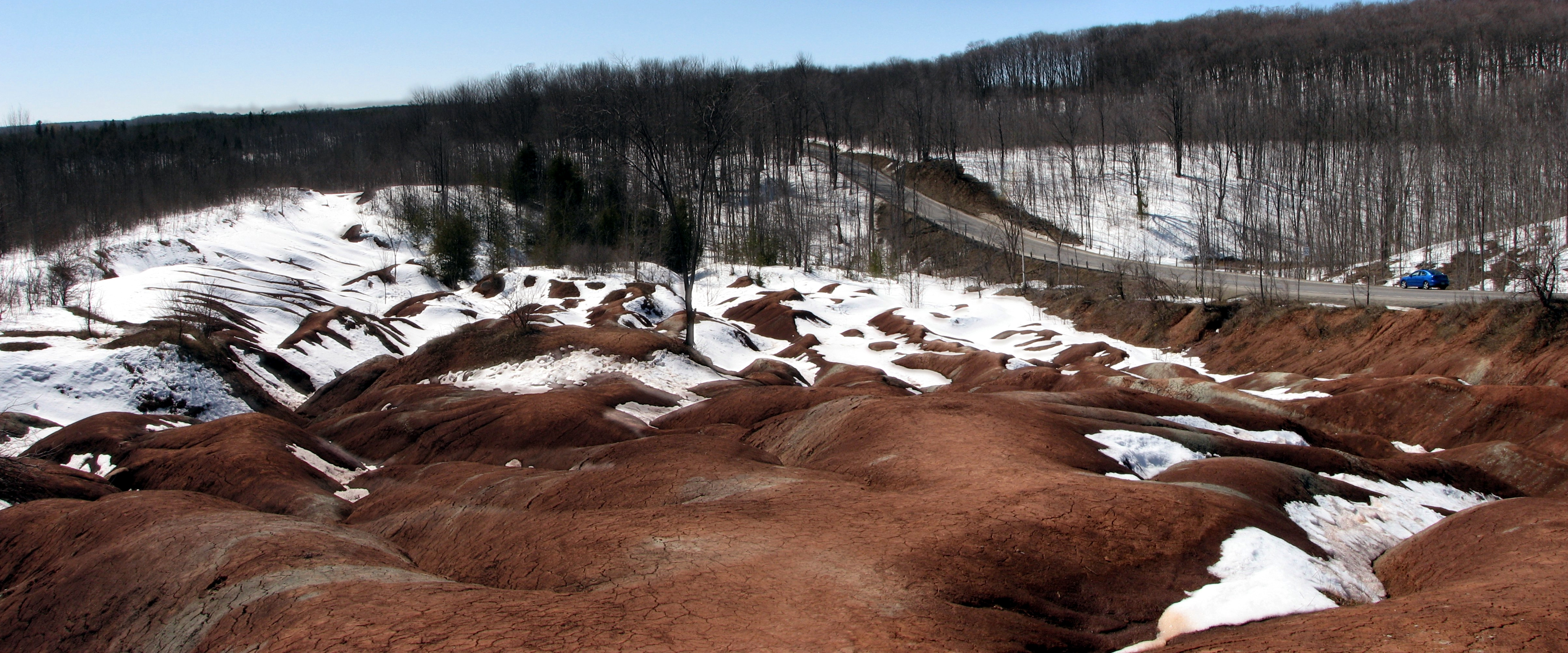
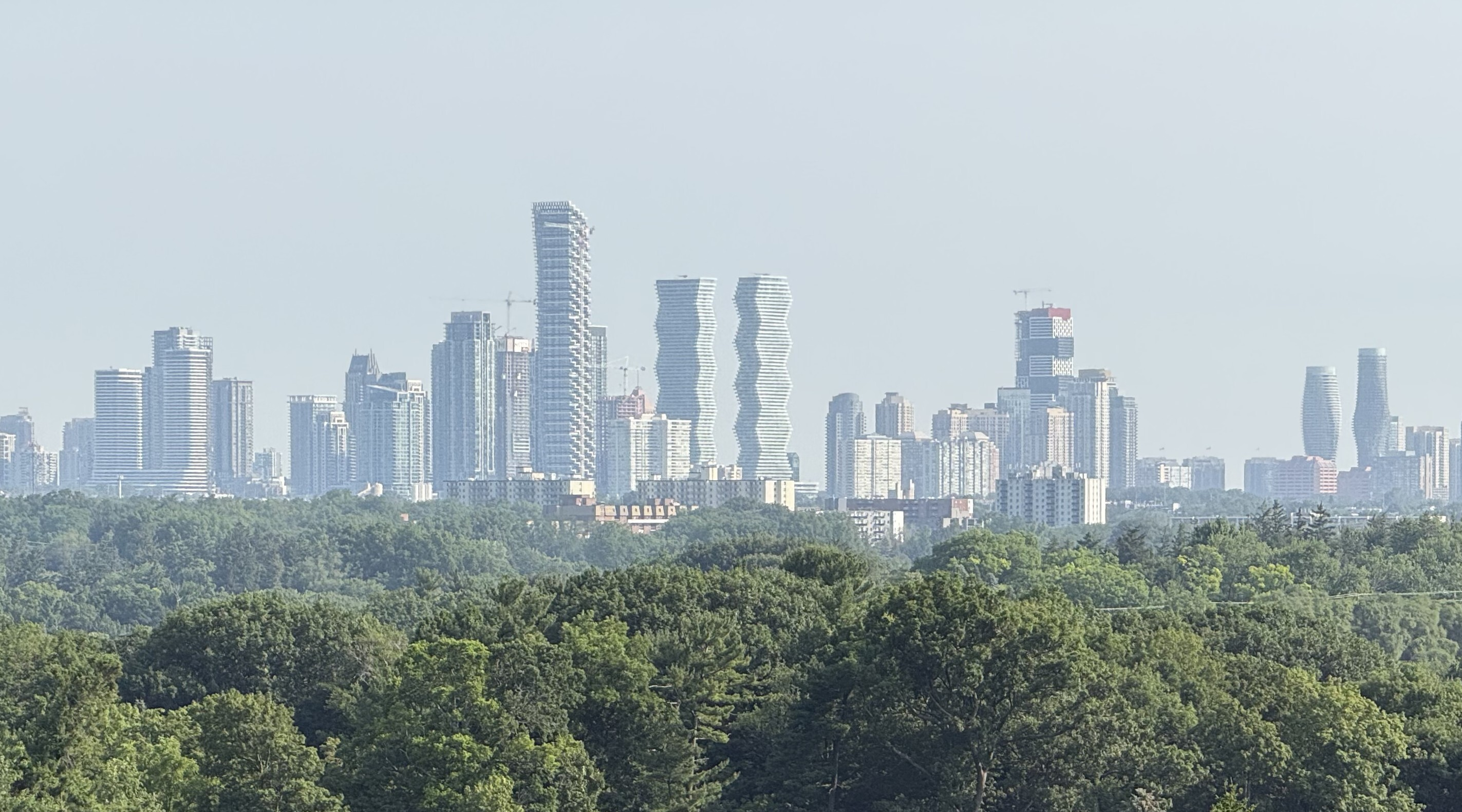
- From top to bottom: Brampton, Cheltenham Badlands (Caledon), Mississauga

- Flag Logo
- Motto: Working with you

- Location in Ontario
- Coordinates: 43°45′10″N 79°47′33″W
- Country: Canada
- Province: Ontario
- Established: January 1, 1974
- Seat: Brampton

Government
  - Chair: Nando Iannicca
  - Governing body: Peel Regional Council

Area
  - Total: 1,247.45 km^{2} (481.64 sq mi)

Population (2021)
  - Total: 1,451,022
  - Density: 1,163.2/km^{2} (3,013/sq mi)
- Time zone: UTC-5 (Eastern (EST))
  - Summer (DST): UTC-4 (Eastern (EDT))
- Postal code prefix: L
- Website: www.peelregion.ca

The Regional Municipality of Peel (less formally Peel Region or Region of Peel, also formerly Peel County) is a regional municipality in the Greater Toronto Area, Southern Ontario, Canada. It consists of three municipalities to the west and northwest of the city of Toronto: the cities of Mississauga and Brampton, and the town of Caledon, each of which spans its full east–west width. The regional seat is in Brampton.

With a population of about 1.5 million, Peel Region's growth can be credited largely to immigration and transportation infrastructure: seven 400-series highways serve the region and most of Toronto Pearson International Airport is located within its boundaries.

Mississauga, which occupies the southernmost portion of the region with over 700,000 residents, is the largest in population in Peel Region and is overall the seventh-largest lower-tier municipality in Canada. It reaches from Lake Ontario north to near Highway 407. Brampton, a city with over 600,000 residents, is located in the centre of the region, while in the north lies the town of Caledon, which is by far the largest town in the area and the most sparsely populated part of the region.

== History ==
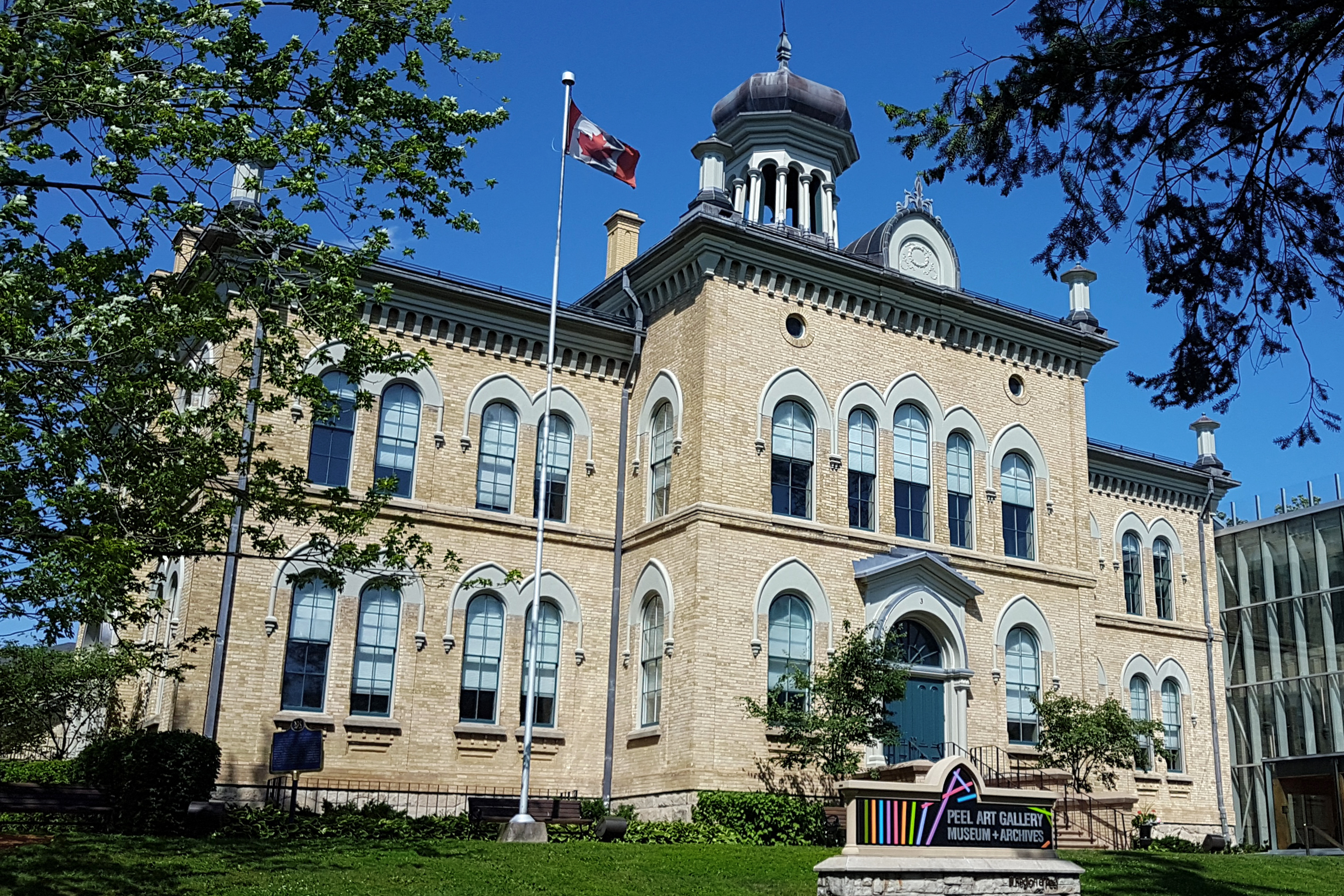
Now an art gallery, the Peel County Courthouse was built from 1865 to 1866

The area was first settled in the early 1800s after being divided into townships in 1805; some of the townships came into existence later (to 1819). County of Peel was formed in 1851. It was named after Sir Robert Peel, the nineteenth-century Prime Minister of the United Kingdom.

The townships that would eventually constitute Peel were initially part of York County in the Home District, and were designated as the West Riding of York in 1845.

In 1867, Peel officially separated from York County. Peel County was dissolved in 1974.

Brampton was virtually a village in 1834. The only building of consequence at the corner of Hurontario (now Main) and Queen Streets, today the centre of Brampton, was William Buffy's tavern. In fact, at the time, the area was referred to as "Buffy's Corners". All real business in Chinguacousy Township took place one mile distant at Martin Salisbury's tavern. By 1834, John Elliott laid out the area in lots for sale, and applied the name "Brampton" to the area, which was soon adopted by others.

The Region of Peel was created by the government of Bill Davis in 1974 from the former Peel County, and was legislated to provide community services to the (then) rapidly urbanizing area of south Peel County (now Mississauga and Brampton). Most of Peel Region boundaries are the same as Peel County. Portions of the former Trafalgar Township in Halton County west of present-day Winston Churchill Boulevard to Ninth Line and south of Highway 407 to Dundas Street became part of Mississauga (forming western parts of Erin Mills and Meadowvale West, as well as Churchill Meadows from Town of Milton).

== Government and politics ==
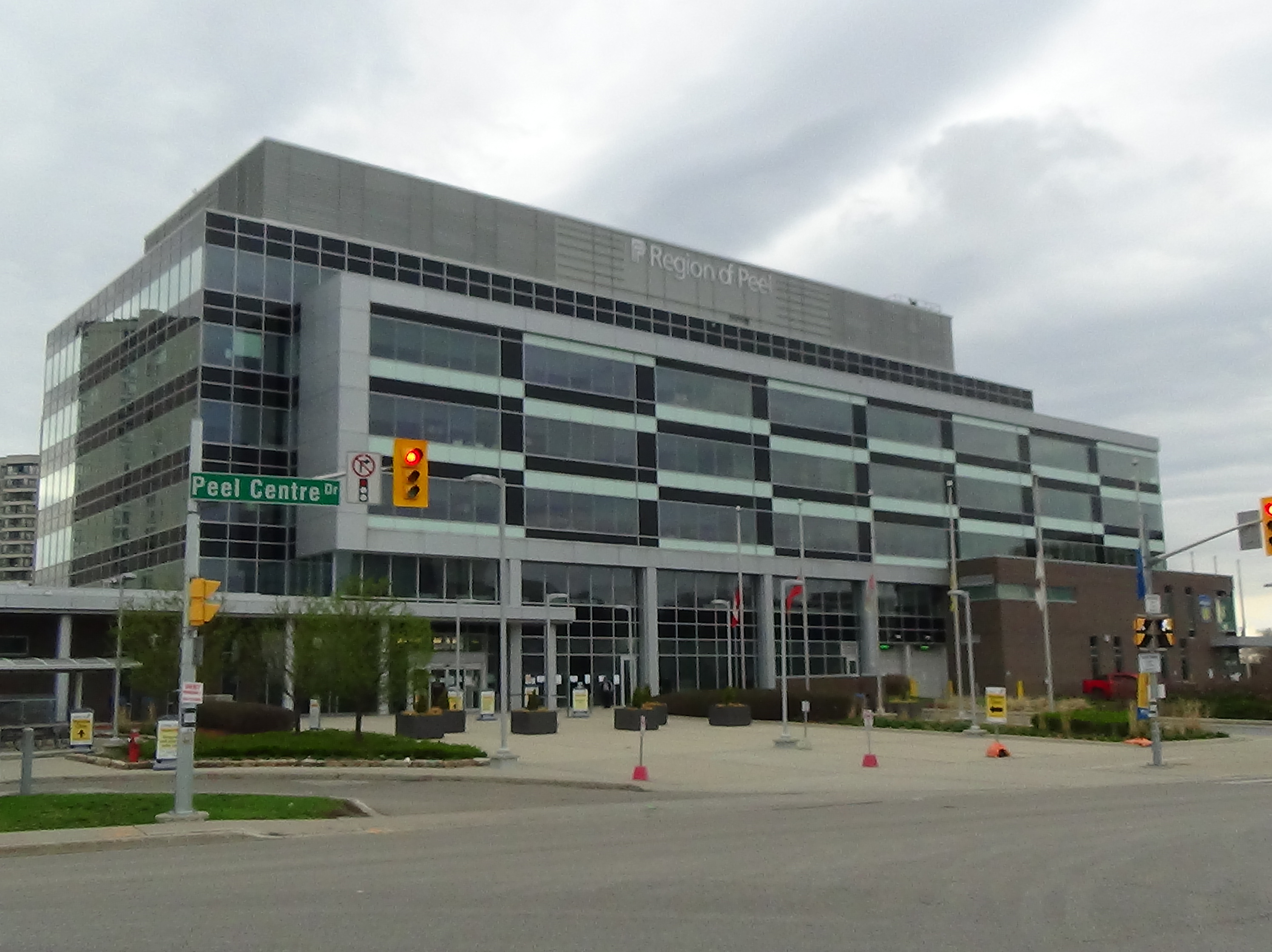
Regional administration building at 10 Peel Centre Drive

=== Senior administrators ===
The senior administrators of the region are:

- Nando Iannicca, Regional Chair
- Gary Kent, Chief Administrative Officer
- Sean Baird, Commissioner of Human Services
- Nancy Polsinelli, Commissioner of Health Services
- Davinder Valeri, Chief Financial Officer and Commissioner of Corporate Services
- Kealy Deadman, Commissioner of Public Works
- Patricia Caza, Commissioner of Legislative Service and Regional Solicitor

=== Notable government decisions ===
- In 2005, Peel Region approved without tender a $557 million waste management contract commitment lasting 20 years that can potentially allow it to dump garbage in Ontario landfill sites if Michigan bans Canadian trash.
- In 2004, Peel Region began a more than $600 million waterworks expansion by conducting invited public tenders, one of Canada's largest in water and wastewater infrastructure.

=== Seat assignment controversy ===
Seats on Peel Regional council are not assigned to member municipalities according to population or tax contributions, and this has produced considerable controversy within the region.

Mississauga currently comprises about 62 per cent of the region's population and says it contributes 66 per cent of the taxes, but had been assigned 10 of the 21 council seats (or 48 per cent) distributed among the municipalities, with Brampton receiving six and Caledon five. In June 2005, the provincial government passed legislation that will revise the composition of the council. Beginning in the 2006 municipal elections, one additional seat will be assigned to Brampton and two additional seats will be assigned to Mississauga, giving Mississauga 12 of the 24 seats assigned to municipalities. These numbers do not include the regional chair, who is appointed by council members.

These changes are the result of a provincially appointed impartial arbitrator who noted:

Regional councilors, whether or not they also wear an area (local) hat, represent all taxpayers in that region...no one area municipality has a majority of regional councillors. This is also why Mississauga's claim for two more regional representatives was seen as vexing - Mississauga would then have a majority at the regional level. Mississauga magnified the control issue by complaining of a historic underrepresentation given that a majority of taxpayers in Peel reside and have resided within Mississauga .. [I] recommend a continuation of a structure that denies any one area municipality a majority at the region.

— George W. Adams

Mississauga council, led by former mayor Hazel McCallion, has argued that Peel Region is an unnecessary layer of government which costs Mississauga residents millions of dollars a year to support services in Brampton and Caledon. Mississauga council unanimously passed a motion asking the Province of Ontario to separate Mississauga from Peel Region and become a single-tier municipality, arguing, among other things, the need to keep property tax dollars within the city of Mississauga for the good of the future of the city.

Opponents of Mississauga's position, including former Brampton mayor Susan Fennell, have argued that from the 1970s through the 1990s, Mississauga was the chief beneficiary of Peel's infrastructure construction projects — funded by taxpayers in all three municipalities — and it is now Brampton's turn to benefit, as it is growing faster than Mississauga, which is mostly built-out. As well, they have argued that common infrastructure, such as waste and water services, would be more efficiently managed at a regional level.

=== Attempted dissolution ===
On May 17, 2023, information leaked that Ontario premier Doug Ford intended to dissolve Peel Region and make the three lower-tier municipalities independent. Calls for Mississauga to be an independent city have existed for many years, including most notably by Mayor Bonnie Crombie, who called for that city to become a single-tier municipality since running for the position of mayor during the 2018 Mississauga municipal election. The following day the government officially announced their intention to dissolve the region.

Subsequently, Municipal Affairs Minister Steve Clark tabled Bill 112, the Hazel McCallion Act, which would dissolve the region on January 1, 2025. The bill was fast-tracked through Parliament, bypassing the committee stage and going straight to third reading. This was criticized by the opposition, claiming that it prevented proper consultation with Peel Region residents. The bill was passed in June 2023. To prepare for the dissolution, the Ontario government convened a 5-member transition board tasked with providing recommendations on winding down the operations of the regional government.

Brampton mayor Patrick Brown was resistant to dissolving the region, claiming that it would leave the city underfunded and interfere with municipal housing priorities. Brown had also demanded that Mississauga pay compensation to cover lost regional funding, which he claimed was critical to ensuring that an independent Brampton could function properly. Caledon mayor Annette Groves was completely opposed to the dissolution, claiming that Caledon was the "child of the divorce" and that they did not have the resources to function without regional funding. New Democrat MPP and municipal affairs critic Jeff Burch proposed having the rural areas of Caledon transferred to Dufferin County.

It had been proposed that some regional services, such as paramedics, public health and police, continue to be shared among the single-tier municipalities after the dissolution. However, there were disagreements over how the services would be funded. Crombie has pushed for them to be funded using a pay-per-usage model, while Brown wanted them to remain under the current assessment formula model.

After the transition board reported that the dissolution would cause heavy increases to municipal property taxes as a result of lost regional funding, the Ontario government announced that they would not continue with dissolving the region.

== Climate ==
Climate data for Lester B. Pearson International Airport (Brampton and North Mississauga) WMO ID: 71624; coordinates 43°40′38″N 79°37′50″W, elevation: 173.4 m (569 ft), 1991–2020 normals, extremes 1937–present
Month	Jan	Feb	Mar	Apr	May	Jun	Jul	Aug	Sep	Oct	Nov	Dec	Year
Record high humidex	19.0	18.3	29.6	37.9	42.6	45.6	50.3	46.6	48.0	39.1	28.6	23.9	50.3
Record high °C (°F)	17.6 (63.7)	17.7 (63.9)	26.0 (78.8)	31.1 (88.0)	34.4 (93.9)	36.7 (98.1)	37.9 (100.2)	38.3 (100.9)	36.7 (98.1)	31.8 (89.2)	25.1 (77.2)	20.0 (68.0)	38.3 (100.9)
Mean maximum °C (°F)	10.0 (50.0)	9.6 (49.3)	16.9 (62.4)	23.6 (74.5)	29.3 (84.7)	32.6 (90.7)	33.1 (91.6)	32.7 (90.9)	31.1 (88.0)	25.6 (78.1)	17.8 (64.0)	11.3 (52.3)	34.5 (94.1)
Mean daily maximum °C (°F)	−1.2 (29.8)	−0.3 (31.5)	5.0 (41.0)	12.0 (53.6)	19.2 (66.6)	24.5 (76.1)	27.4 (81.3)	26.3 (79.3)	22.3 (72.1)	14.6 (58.3)	7.9 (46.2)	1.9 (35.4)	13.3 (55.9)
Daily mean °C (°F)	−5 (23)	−4.4 (24.1)	0.6 (33.1)	7.0 (44.6)	13.7 (56.7)	19.2 (66.6)	22.1 (71.8)	21.1 (70.0)	16.9 (62.4)	10.0 (50.0)	4.1 (39.4)	−1.6 (29.1)	8.6 (47.5)
Mean daily minimum °C (°F)	−8.9 (16.0)	−8.5 (16.7)	−3.8 (25.2)	1.9 (35.4)	8.2 (46.8)	13.9 (57.0)	16.6 (61.9)	15.8 (60.4)	11.6 (52.9)	5.3 (41.5)	0.2 (32.4)	−5 (23)	3.9 (39.0)
Mean minimum °C (°F)	−19.9 (−3.8)	−18.7 (−1.7)	−13.8 (7.2)	−4.8 (23.4)	1.2 (34.2)	7.3 (45.1)	11.4 (52.5)	10.6 (51.1)	4.5 (40.1)	−1.5 (29.3)	−7.9 (17.8)	−14.9 (5.2)	−22.0 (−7.6)
Record low °C (°F)	−31.3 (−24.3)	−31.1 (−24.0)	−28.9 (−20.0)	−17.2 (1.0)	−5.6 (21.9)	0.6 (33.1)	3.9 (39.0)	1.1 (34.0)	−3.9 (25.0)	−8.3 (17.1)	−18.3 (−0.9)	−31.1 (−24.0)	−31.3 (−24.3)
Record low wind chill	−44.7	−38.9	−36.2	−25.4	−9.5	0.0	0.0	0.0	−8.0	−13.5	−25.4	−38.5	−44.7
Average precipitation mm (inches)	61.6 (2.43)	50.2 (1.98)	50.5 (1.99)	76.7 (3.02)	77.6 (3.06)	80.7 (3.18)	74.0 (2.91)	68.5 (2.70)	69.4 (2.73)	67.2 (2.65)	71.8 (2.83)	58.6 (2.31)	806.8 (31.76)
Average rainfall mm (inches)	33.8 (1.33)	23.9 (0.94)	34.0 (1.34)	70.7 (2.78)	77.5 (3.05)	80.7 (3.18)	74.0 (2.91)	68.5 (2.70)	69.4 (2.73)	67.0 (2.64)	62.7 (2.47)	35.3 (1.39)	697.4 (27.46)
Average snowfall cm (inches)	31.5 (12.4)	27.7 (10.9)	17.2 (6.8)	4.5 (1.8)	0.1 (0.0)	0.0 (0.0)	0.0 (0.0)	0.0 (0.0)	0.0 (0.0)	0.2 (0.1)	9.3 (3.7)	24.1 (9.5)	114.5 (45.1)
Average precipitation days (≥ 0.2 mm)	16.2	12.0	12.3	12.5	12.7	10.8	10.3	9.8	10.2	12.8	12.6	14.9	147.3
Average rainy days (≥ 0.2 mm)	6.2	4.6	7.2	11.7	12.7	10.8	10.3	9.8	10.2	12.8	10.4	7.5	114.1
Average snowy days (≥ 0.2 cm)	12.7	9.7	6.8	2.2	0.12	0.0	0.0	0.0	0.0	0.24	3.6	9.2	44.7
Average relative humidity (%) (at 15:00)	69.7	65.7	58.5	53.4	53.6	54.4	52.9	55.2	57.3	61.6	66.7	70.5	60.0
Average dew point °C (°F)	−8.6 (16.5)	−8.4 (16.9)	−5.2 (22.6)	−0.4 (31.3)	6.4 (43.5)	12.3 (54.1)	14.9 (58.8)	14.9 (58.8)	11.6 (52.9)	5.5 (41.9)	−0.1 (31.8)	−4.9 (23.2)	3.2 (37.8)
Mean monthly sunshine hours	79.7	112.2	159.4	204.4	228.2	249.7	294.4	274.5	215.7	163.7	94.2	86.2	2,161.4
Percentage possible sunshine	27.6	38.0	43.2	50.8	50.1	54.1	63.0	63.4	57.4	47.8	32.0	30.9	46.5
Source 1: Environment and Climate Change Canada
Source 2: weatherstats.ca (for dewpoint and monthly/yearly average absolute maximum/minimum temperature)

Climate data for Albion Field Centre (Albion Township and Caledon) Climate ID: 6150103; coordinates 43°55′N 79°50′W; elevation: 281.9 m (925 ft); 1981–2010 normals, extremes 1969–2001
Month	Jan	Feb	Mar	Apr	May	Jun	Jul	Aug	Sep	Oct	Nov	Dec	Year
Record high °C (°F)	12.0 (53.6)	14.5 (58.1)	24.5 (76.1)	30.0 (86.0)	33.0 (91.4)	34.5 (94.1)	36.1 (97.0)	35.0 (95.0)	34.4 (93.9)	30.6 (87.1)	22.2 (72.0)	19.5 (67.1)	36.1 (97.0)
Mean daily maximum °C (°F)	−2.8 (27.0)	−1.4 (29.5)	3.7 (38.7)	11.6 (52.9)	18.8 (65.8)	23.7 (74.7)	26.3 (79.3)	25.1 (77.2)	19.9 (67.8)	13.2 (55.8)	5.8 (42.4)	−0.3 (31.5)	12.0 (53.6)
Daily mean °C (°F)	−7.0 (19.4)	−5.9 (21.4)	−1.4 (29.5)	6.1 (43.0)	12.4 (54.3)	17.3 (63.1)	19.9 (67.8)	19.1 (66.4)	14.3 (57.7)	8.1 (46.6)	2.1 (35.8)	−3.9 (25.0)	6.7 (44.1)
Mean daily minimum °C (°F)	−11.2 (11.8)	−10.4 (13.3)	−6.6 (20.1)	0.5 (32.9)	5.9 (42.6)	10.9 (51.6)	13.5 (56.3)	13.0 (55.4)	8.6 (47.5)	2.9 (37.2)	−1.7 (28.9)	−7.4 (18.7)	1.5 (34.7)
Record low °C (°F)	−36.5 (−33.7)	−35.0 (−31.0)	−31.5 (−24.7)	−21.1 (−6.0)	−6.1 (21.0)	−1.5 (29.3)	1.7 (35.1)	−0.5 (31.1)	−5.0 (23.0)	−11.5 (11.3)	−19.0 (−2.2)	−32.0 (−25.6)	−36.5 (−33.7)
Average precipitation mm (inches)	60.4 (2.38)	50.2 (1.98)	50.3 (1.98)	67.0 (2.64)	76.1 (3.00)	75.5 (2.97)	81.8 (3.22)	77.4 (3.05)	75.0 (2.95)	68.3 (2.69)	81.7 (3.22)	57.7 (2.27)	821.5 (32.34)
Average rainfall mm (inches)	24.0 (0.94)	22.2 (0.87)	27.3 (1.07)	63.0 (2.48)	76.1 (3.00)	75.5 (2.97)	81.8 (3.22)	77.4 (3.05)	75.0 (2.95)	64.9 (2.56)	67.8 (2.67)	25.9 (1.02)	681.0 (26.81)
Average snowfall cm (inches)	36.4 (14.3)	28.0 (11.0)	23.0 (9.1)	4.0 (1.6)	0.0 (0.0)	0.0 (0.0)	0.0 (0.0)	0.0 (0.0)	0.0 (0.0)	3.4 (1.3)	13.8 (5.4)	31.9 (12.6)	140.5 (55.3)
Average precipitation days (≥ 0.2 mm)	12.4	9.4	9.6	10.8	10.3	10.2	9.0	9.8	10.8	11.3	12.1	9.8	125.5
Average rainy days (≥ 0.2 mm)	3.3	3.6	5.2	9.9	10.3	10.2	9.0	9.8	10.8	11.2	9.3	3.7	96.2
Average snowy days (≥ 0.2 cm)	9.8	6.4	5.3	1.4	0.1	0.0	0.0	0.0	0.0	0.6	4.0	6.8	34.3
Source: Environment and Climate Change Canada

=== Factors that influence the climate ===
The region's climate are influenced by various air masses and weather systems from other locations, proximity to Lake Ontario, topography and elevation (e.g. Niagara Escarpment, and Oak Ridges Moraine), and urban and rural land uses. The air masses and weather systems are the major factors in influencing the climate of the region. Being located in Southern Ontario, it is located between the Arctic, subtropics, and the Atlantic Ocean; consequentially, it is impacted by air masses from different origins. In general, the air masses that affect the region are continental polar, continental arctic, maritime polar, and occasionally continental tropical air masses in summer. During winter, cold and dry air masses predominate (continental arctic and maritime polar) although warmer, moister air masses may move north during this time, leading to milder temperatures and potential for heavy snowfall/freezing rain/rainfall. The most severe snow and freezing rain events occur when warmer, moister air masses move northward to the region and meet colder air. During winter, a common type of storm is known as the "Alberta Clipper" which affects the region in which moist Pacific air moves east of the Rocky Mountains to the region, bringing snow that is often followed by the influx of cold continental air afterwards (leads to colder temperatures). Spring and autumn are characterized by variable weather and rapid alternating air masses. This leads to frequent cloudy conditions, rain, and occasional thunderstorms. In summer, the air masses that influence the region are predominantly maritime polar air masses from the Pacific Ocean, and tropical air masses from the Gulf of Mexico, the latter being responsible for bringing heat waves, high humidity, and intense rainfall events. Towards late summer and early autumn, the remnants of tropical storms and hurricanes may bring strong winds and heavy rainfalls to the area. During autumn, Arctic air masses become increasingly common, leading to colder conditions.

The Great Lakes (particularly Lake Ontario) moderate the cooler air masses during autumn and winter, causing the region to have milder conditions than similar areas away from the Lakes. Because the Great Lakes are slower to warm than the land, they keep shoreline areas cooler in spring, leading to prolonged cool weather that persists well into April. The prolonged cool conditions on the shoreline causes the leafing and blossoming of the plants to be delayed, which protects tender plants such as fruit trees from being damaged by late spring frosts. Thus, plants from more warmer climates are able to survive on the shoreline due to this. Occasionally, temperature inversions can occur, particularly in spring and early summer. Temperature inversions occur when warm, moist air from the Gulf of Mexico moves pass the Great Lakes because while the top layers of the Lakes are warmed, the bottom layers remain cool, leading to moisture and airborne pollutants being trapped in the cool air below, humid days, and causing fog, haze, and smog in low laying industrial areas. The Great Lakes also stabilize conditions in spring and summer (due to the relatively cooler lake surfaces), leading to lower spring and summer precipitation on their shorelines compared to inland areas. In winter, lake effect snowfall occurs. In spring and summer, lake breezes can penetrate inland, creating narrow boundaries more inland causing cloudy conditions, severe thunderstorms, and convective rainfall events. This is known as the "lake breeze front" or "lake breeze thunderstorms" phenomenon, in which intense, sharply defined squall lines develop quickly on summer afternoons amplified by localized wind patterns between the Great Lakes. This is seen by the tendency for thunderstorms from the west to weaken/dissipate as they approach Toronto Pearson Airport, located in the southeastern part of the region.

=== Temperature ===
Temperatures are higher in the southern parts of Peel compared to the northern parts of the region. Annual temperatures are 3 °C (5 °F) warmer in the south than in the northern parts of the region. This is due to the lower elevations found in the southern parts of the region, moderating effects of Lake Ontario, and more urbanization in the south (due to the urban heat island effect). In colder months, areas closer to Lake Ontario are warmer while in particularly in spring and summer, the same areas are cooler on many afternoons, owing to the moderating effect of the Lake.

=== Precipitation ===
Generally, the northwestern parts of Peel Region are the wettest areas both seasonally and annually while southern parts are the driest. Mean annual precipitation in the region ranges from 835 to 935 mm (32.9 to 36.8 in) in the northwest to 794 to 836 mm (31.3 to 32.9 in) in Mississauga in the south. The north–south precipitation gradient is primarily due to topographic and elevation differences, and some regional storm track differences. The regional storm track differences include the influence of the Great Lakes on summertime convective precipitation, northernmost extent to where tropical air progresses in winter, and positions of frontal zones in spring and autumn). These regional storm track differences are responsible for a slight rain shadow effect for most of Peel except for the northern parts which lie on the windward side and receive more precipitation from frontal systems moving from the west. In all seasons, precipitation mostly comes from low pressure systems from the mid-Atlantic states and Gulf of Mexico.

== Demographics ==
As a census division in the 2021 Census of Population conducted by Statistics Canada, the Regional Municipality of Peel had a population of 1,451,022 living in 450,746 of its 467,970 total private dwellings, a change of 5% from its 2016 population of 1,381,739. With a land area of 1,247.45 km^{2} (481.64 sq mi), it had a population density of 1,163.2/km^{2} (3,012.6/sq mi) in 2021.

Canada census – Regional Municipality of Peel community profile

	2021	2016	2011
Population	1,451,022 (+5.0% from 2016)	1,381,739 (+6.5% from 2011)	1,296,814 (11.8% from 2006)
Land area	1,247.45 km^{2} (481.64 sq mi)	1,246.95 km^{2} (481.45 sq mi)	1,246.89 km^{2} (481.43 sq mi)
Population density	1,163.2/km^{2} (3,013/sq mi)	1,108.1/km^{2} (2,870/sq mi)	1,040.0/km^{2} (2,694/sq mi)
Median age	38.4 (M: 36.8, F: 39.6)	38.1 (M: 37.0, F: 39.1)
Private dwellings	467,970 (total) 450,746 (occupied)	443,918 (total) 430,180 (occupied)	416,850 (total)
Median household income	$107,000	$86,233

References: 2021 2016 2011

Historical census populations – Regional Municipality of Peel

Year	Pop.	±%
1976	375,910	—
1981	490,731	+30.5%
1986	592,154	+20.7%
1991	732,798	+23.8%
1996	852,526	+16.3%

Year	Pop.	±%
2001	988,948	+16.0%
2006	1,159,405	+17.2%
2011	1,296,809	+11.9%
2016	1,381,739	+6.5%
2021	1,451,022	+5.0%

2011 Population figures based on revised count. Population counts are not adjusted for boundary changes.
Source: Statistics Canada

=== Ethnicity ===
Largest ethnic origin in Peel Region by census tract based on the 2021 census

The largest ethnicities in Peel as per the 2021 census are Indian (19.5%), English (5.8%), Italian (5.3%), Punjabi (4.9%), Irish (4.8%), Pakistani (4.7%), Scottish (4.7%), Chinese (4.7%), and Filipino (4.1%).

Panethnic groups in Peel (2001−2021)
Panethnic group	2021		2016		2011		2006		2001	
Panethnic group	Pop.	%	Pop.	%	Pop.	%	Pop.	%	Pop.	%
South Asian	537,930	37.38%	434,105	31.63%	356,430	27.65%	272,760	23.63%	155,055	15.73%
European (Note: Statistic includes all persons that did not make up part of a visible minority or an indigenous identity.)	441,300	30.67%	508,955	37.08%	549,125	42.6%	571,905	49.56%	602,545	61.14%
African	137,295	9.54%	131,060	9.55%	116,265	9.02%	95,565	8.28%	70,695	7.17%
Southeast Asian (Note: Statistic includes total responses of "Filipino" and "Southeast Asian" under visible minority section on census.)	86,760	6.03%	80,620	5.87%	82,570	6.41%	63,370	5.49%	44,675	4.53%
East Asian (Note: Statistic includes total responses of "Chinese", "Korean", and "Japanese" under visible minority section on census.)	69,005	4.8%	72,970	5.32%	68,365	5.3%	64,870	5.62%	50,055	5.08%
Middle Eastern (Note: Statistic includes total responses of "West Asian" and "Arab" under visible minority section on census.)	66,080	4.59%	55,935	4.07%	40,730	3.16%	28,445	2.46%	18,800	1.91%
Latin American	32,120	2.23%	31,060	2.26%	27,360	2.12%	21,440	1.86%	14,665	1.49%
Indigenous	7,430	0.52%	9,120	0.66%	7,085	0.55%	5,500	0.48%	3,915	0.4%
Other (Note: Statistic includes total responses of "Visible minority, n.i.e." and "Multiple visible minorities" under visible minority section on census.)	61,160	4.25%	48,805	3.56%	41,080	3.19%	30,200	2.62%	25,165	2.55%
Total responses	1,439,075	99.18%	1,372,640	99.34%	1,289,015	99.4%	1,154,070	99.54%	985,565	99.66%
Total population	1,451,022	100%	1,381,739	100%	1,296,814	100%	1,159,405	100%	988,948	100%

- Note: Totals greater than 100% due to multiple origin responses.

=== Religion ===
According to the 2021 Census, 44% of Peel's population was Christian, 14% was Sikh, 13% was Hindu, 13% was Muslim, 2% belonged to other faiths and 15% had no religious affiliation.

Religious groups in Peel (1991−2021)
Religious group	2021		2011		2001		1991	
Religious group	Pop.	%	Pop.	%	Pop.	%	Pop.	%
Christian	632,455	43.95%	733,790	56.93%	689,330	69.94%	580,885	79.61%
Sikh	198,630	13.8%	122,960	9.54%	58,315	5.92%	21,300	2.92%
Hindu	183,460	12.75%	113,210	8.78%	46,965	4.77%	18,665	2.56%
Muslim	181,995	12.65%	121,500	9.43%	53,470	5.43%	17,035	2.33%
Buddhist	21,765	1.51%	22,425	1.74%	14,985	1.52%	5,515	0.76%
Jewish	2,190	0.15%	2,845	0.22%	2,635	0.27%	2,695	0.37%
Indigenous spirituality	30	0%	90	0.01%	N/A	N/A	N/A	N/A
Other religion	7,685	0.53%	4,680	0.36%	3,120	0.32%	1,915	0.26%
Irreligious	210,865	14.65%	167,520	13%	116,740	11.84%	81,640	11.19%
Total responses	1,439,075	99.18%	1,289,015	99.4%	985,565	99.66%	729,650	99.57%

=== Language ===
According to the 2011 Census, 50.61% of Peel's population have English as mother tongue; Punjabi is the mother tongue of 8.92% of the population, followed by Urdu (3.84%), Polish (2.68%), Portuguese (2.29%), Tagalog (2.24%), Italian (2.09%), Spanish (2.08%), Arabic (1.96%), and Hindi (1.50%).

Mother tongue	Population	Percentage
English	653,555	50.61%
Punjabi	115,200	8.92%
Urdu	49,550	3.84%
Polish	34,585	2.68%
Portuguese	29,620	2.29%
Tagalog (Filipino)	28,875	2.24%
Italian	27,015	2.09%
Spanish	26,835	2.08%
Arabic	25,270	1.96%
Hindi	19,375	1.50%

== Services ==
The region is responsible for the services and infrastructure related to water delivery and wastewater treatment, waste collection and disposal, some arterial roads, public health, long-term care centres, Peel Regional Police, Peel Regional Paramedic Services, planning, public housing, paratransit, judicial and social services. Other municipal functions are provided by the three local-tier municipalities. These responsibilities have changed over time, as functions have been uploaded and downloaded to and from the provincial and regional levels, as directed by the Government of Ontario.

=== Law enforcement ===
- Peel Regional Police (PRP) provides police coverage for the majority of the region excluding Caledon as well as airport policing within Toronto Pearson International Airport (replaced the RCMP)
- Ontario Provincial Police (OPP) mainly provides policing on:
  - Provincial highways (400 series): QEW - Winston Churchill Boulevard to Etobicoke Creek; Highway 401 - from Ninth Line to Highway 427; Highway 403 - from Dundas Street to Highways 410/401; Highway 409 - from Toronto-Pearson International Airport to Highway 427; Highway 410 - from Highway 403 to Highway 10 transition; (Other King's Highways): Highway 9 - from Highway 10 to Albion Trail; Highway 10 - from Highway 410 transition to Highway 9.
  - Patrols privately operated Highway 407 ETR from Highway 403 to Regional Road 50
  - Fulfils a contract to police the town of Caledon.

=== Other services ===
Emergency medical services provided by Peel to the region's municipalities:

Peel Regional Paramedic Services

Formerly administered by the province, now in the hands of the region.

Long Term Care

Facilities are for seniors and others with long-term health needs:

- The Davis Centre
- Malton Village
- Peel Manor
- Sheridan Villa
- Tall Pines

Social Housing

The Regional Municipality of Peel owns and operates Peel Living, a social housing corporation, which is the largest landlord in the region one of the largest in Canada.

Public Works

Peel manages the regions public works needs including:

- Garbage and Recycling Programs.
- Water works.
- Road maintenance for many major roads — non-provincial roads.

TransHelp

The Region of Peel operates paratransit service for people with disabilities. Transhelp, which was formerly run for Miway in Mississauga, and Brampton Transit in Brampton. Convention transit is operated by the aforementioned transit systems.

== Transportation ==
=== Highways ===
Seven 400-Series Highways border or pass through Peel Region. These freeways are among the busiest in Ontario, have been mostly constructed since the 1970s, and have contributed to the rapid growth of the Region.

400-series freeways:

- Highway 401
- Highway 403
- Highway 407 (ETR)
- Highway 409
- Highway 410
- Highway 427
- Queen Elizabeth Way (QEW)

Other highways:

- Highway 9, which forms the northern boundary of the region
- Highway 10
- Highway 50 which forms the eastern boundary of the region (Vaughan) south of Bolton. Note: Highway 50 is no longer officially a provincial highway and is now Peel Road 50.

Peel Region has designated several roads as regional roads with a shield denoting the thoroughfare's number.

=== Air ===
The vast majority of Toronto Pearson International Airport (YYZ) is located within Mississauga, contrary to the airport's official name. The highway is directly accessible by Highways 409 and 427. A people mover connects the two terminals and Viscount station within the airport.

=== Commuter rail ===
Three of GO Transit's seven commuter rail lines stop in the region:

- The Kitchener line, which runs between Toronto Union Station and the city of Kitchener in Waterloo Region has four stops in Peel Region; three in Brampton and one in Mississauga, at Mount Pleasant, Brampton, Bramalea and Malton, respectively.
- The Milton line, which runs between Union and the town of Milton in Halton Region has six stations in Mississauga; Dixie, Cooksville, Erindale, Streetsville, Meadowvale and Lisgar.
- The Lakeshore West line, which runs between Union and the city of Hamilton has two stations on Mississauga's Lakeshore; Port Credit and Clarkson. Long Branch, while technically on Toronto prior, is very close to Toronto city limits and is served by MiWay bus routes. Express trains between Union and Niagara Falls via St. Catharines stop at Port Credit but skip Clarkson on their way to and from Oakville.

=== Bus rapid transit ===
The Mississauga Transitway is a 12-stop bus transitway that follows Highway 403 and Eglinton Avenue. GO Transit suburban bus routes and Mississauga Transit local routes use the transitway to connect Toronto, particularly Etobicoke, to Mississauga's City Centre and vice versa.

=== Future ===
The Hurontario LRT is an under-construction north-south light rail transit line that will parallel Hurontario Street. It will have 19 stations along 16 kilometres of trackage, connecting the Lakeshore West line's station at Port Credit to the Milton line's station at Cooksville, Mississauga's City Centre, the Mississauga Transitway and its large bus terminal at Highway 403 and Brampton Transit at Brampton Gateway Terminal at Hurontario's intersection with Steeles Avenue.

The Dundas Street BRT is a proposed bus rapid transit line to follow Dundas Street between Kipling station in Etobicoke, Toronto and Ontario Highway 6 Hamilton's unincorporated town of Waterdown. Bus routes operated by the cities of Hamilton, Burlington, Oakville, Mississauga and Toronto would supposedly use this transitway, although construction on the project has not commenced and has no deadline.

The Queen Street BRT is a proposed extension of the existing Highway 7 rapidway operated by York Region Transit's viva into the city of Brampton's downtown. It would follow the former Highway 7 to Hurontario Street, connecting to the Kitchener line and Brampton's historic downtown region. 501 Zum buses to Vaughan Metropolitan Centre in Vaughan, York Region would use this rapidway, though construction has not begun or been announced.

== Education ==
=== Elementary and secondary ===
Education in the Region of Peel is primarily available from taxpayer-funded public schools (secular) and separate schools (Catholic) in both the English and French languages.

Schools in Peel are managed by four school boards: the Peel District School Board (English public), the Dufferin-Peel Catholic District School Board (English separate), the Conseil scolaire Viamonde (French public), and the Conseil scolaire de district catholique Centre-Sud (French separate).

=== Post-secondary ===
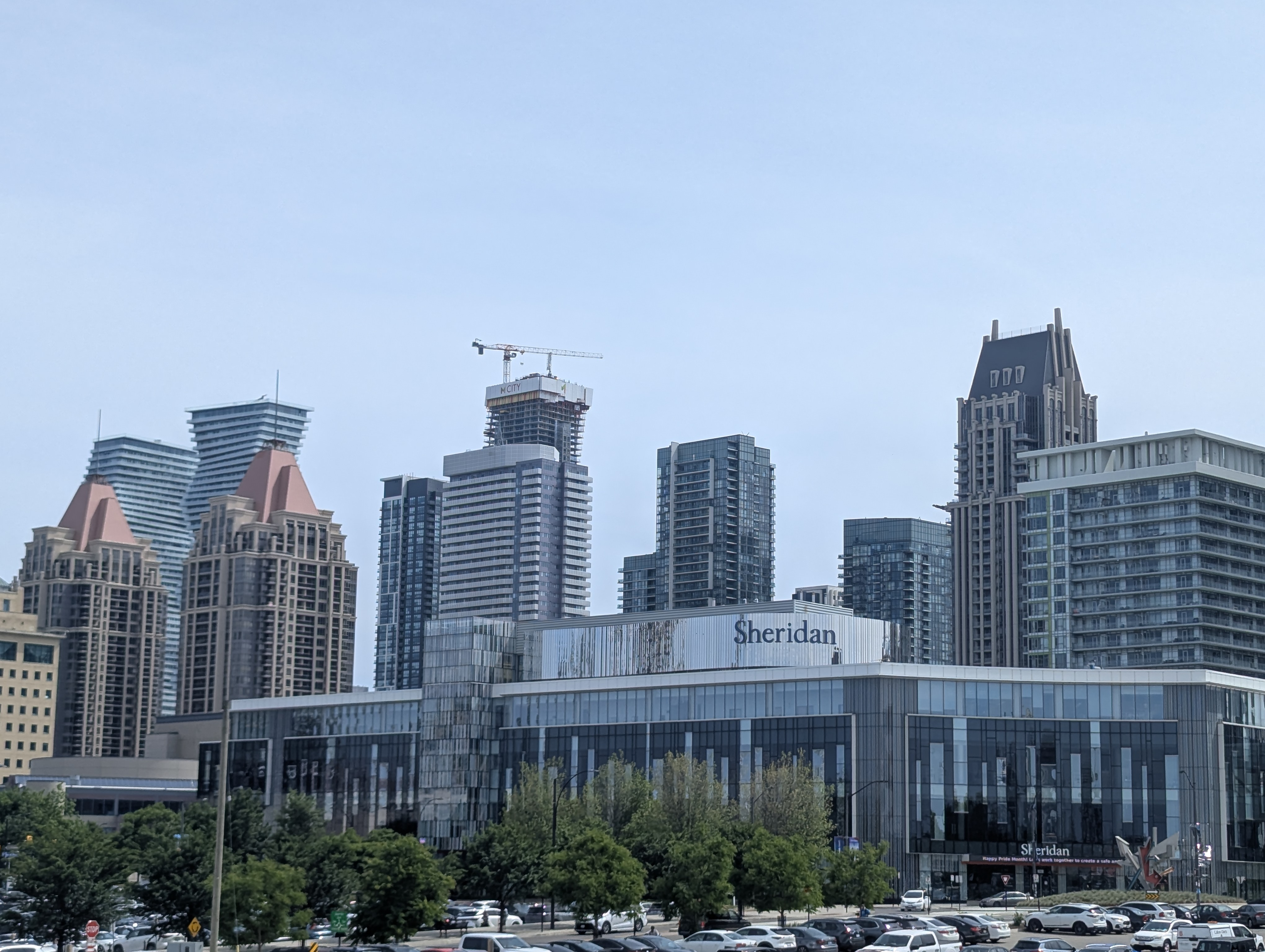
The Hazel McCallion Campus of Sheridan College

Colleges and universities located in the Peel Region are the University of Toronto Mississauga, Algoma University's Brampton Campus, Lambton College's Mississauga Campus, and two campuses of Sheridan College: the Davis Campus in Brampton and Hazel McCallion Campus in Mississauga.

In 2025, Toronto Metropolitan University (formerly Ryerson University) opened its School of Medicine at the Bramalea Civic Centre in Brampton. It is the first new medical school in the Greater Toronto Area in over 100 years, and one of only two medical schools operating in the Peel Region, the other being the Temerty Faculty of Medicine at the University of Toronto. The school was established to help address a shortage of family physicians in Peel and partners with the William Osler Health System for clinical training; its inaugural class admitted 94 MD students from over 6,400 applicants.

The region is also home to private post-secondary institutions offering vocational training including Springfield College Brampton, CDI College, TriOS College, Academy of Learning, Evergreen College, Medix College, CIMT College, Torbram College, Bitts International Career College, Canadian College of Business, Science & Technology, Hanson College, Queenswood College B, H & T, Flair College of Management and Technology, Sunview College, and College Of Health Studies.

== See also ==
- List of municipalities in Ontario
- List of secondary schools in Ontario#Regional Municipality of Peel
