= Peel Regional Police =

Police force in Ontario, Canada

Peel Regional Police Police régionale de Peel
- Motto: A Safer Community Together!

Agency overview
- Formed: 1974

Jurisdictional structure
- Constituting instrument: Community Safety and Policing Act, 2019 (SO 2019, c. 1, Sched. 1)

Operational structure
- Headquarters: 7150 Mississauga Road; Mississauga, Ontario
- Sworn members: 2,936
- Unsworn members: 1,155
- Elected officer responsible: Hon. Michael Kerzner, Solicitor General of Ontario
- Agency executive: Nishan Duraiappah, chief of police
- Divisions: 5

Website
- www.peelpolice.ca

The Peel Regional Police Service (commonly referred to as Peel Regional Police, or PRP) provides policing services for Peel Region (excluding Caledon) in Ontario, Canada. It is the second largest municipal police service in Ontario, and the third largest municipal force in Canada, with 2,200 uniformed members and close to 875 support staff members. The Peel Regional Police serve approximately 1.48 million citizens of Mississauga and Brampton, located immediately west and northwest of Toronto, and provide law enforcement services at Toronto Pearson International Airport (located in Mississauga), which annually sees 50 million travelers. Although it is part of the Regional Municipality of Peel, policing for the Town of Caledon, which is located north of Brampton, is the responsibility of the Ontario Provincial Police (OPP).

The PRP also patrols the section of Highway 409 between the Peel-Toronto boundary line (immediately west of Highway 427) and Pearson International Airport. Policing of all other 400-series highways that pass through the region, including highways 401, 403, 410, and 427 as well as the Queen Elizabeth Way and the 407 ETR, is the responsibility of the OPP.

== History ==
The Peel Regional Police Service on January 1, 1974, with the creation of the Regional Municipality of Peel, which saw responsibility for policing transferred from local municipalities to the new, upper-tier region. The service was formed out of the merger of the police forces of Brampton (formed in 1873), Mississauga (formed in 1944), Chinguacousy (formed in 1853), Port Credit (formed in 1909), and Streetsville (formed in 1858) were merged into a single police service responsible for the new, expanded cities of Mississauga and Brampton. Uniquely, at amalgamation the Town of Caledon opted to maintain the Ontario Provincial Police for the provision of police services, creating a unique reporting structure whereby the OPP reports to the Town of Caledon, which in turn reports to Peel Region and the Peel Police Service Board. As of 2026, Peel Region is the only regional municipality in Ontario that maintains multiple police services. Since amalgamation, five officers have died in the course of their duties, four from traffic collisions (the latest in March 2010) and one from a stabbing in 1984.

In 2020, the Service, the Police Services Board, and the Ontario Human Rights Commission signed a memorandum of understanding to share data and information and conduct community consultations to create a legally binding commitment towards ending discriminatory policing practices in Peel Region. The memorandum, creating for a six-month renewable period, committed the service to, among other things, developing a routine engagement strategy with racialized communities, collecting and regularly monitoring data on police interactions by race, and undertaking organizational changes to recruiting, training, promotion, and operational structure in line with the Commission's best-practice guide on Human Rights and Policing.

In 2024, the Peel Regional Police partnered with the Alzheimers Society of Peel to establish Project Lantern, the first program of its kind in Canada, aimed at preventing people with Alzheimers or dementia from going missing in Peel Region. The service also maintains a vulnerable persons registry for residents who live in or regularly visit Peel Region and have a disorder that may cause them to wander or get lost with no way to get home.

== Governance ==
The Peel Regional Police Service Board consists of civilians who govern the police service. The Board’s membership consists of three provincial appointees, a citizen appointee, and three others, including representatives (usually the mayor or their designate) of Brampton and Mississauga, and the Regional Council Chair. The council heads, as Board Chair and Vice Chair, are selected from among the other board members.

== Command structure ==
The Peel Regional Police divide the region into five divisions. Major police stations are located in each division, which smaller community police stations support. These provide residents with services to deal with traffic complaints, neighborhood disputes, minor thefts, community issues, landlord-tenant disputes, found property, and doubts or questions related to policing in the community.

=== 11 Division ===
Commanded by Superintendent Joshua Colley

- 3030 Erin Mills Parkway, Mississauga

=== 12 Division ===
Commanded by Superintendent Joy Edwards

- 4600 Dixie Road, Mississauga

The Marine Unit at 135 Lakefront Promenade is located in this division. The unit is responsible for 105 square kilometers of waterways, including Lake Ontario and rivers that run in the region, using 3 boats. It was created in 1974 and inherited 1 boat from the Port Credit Police Department.

=== 21 Division ===
Commanded by Superintendent Jodi Dawson

- 10 Peel Centre Drive, Suite C, Brampton

=== 22 Division ===
Commanded by Superintendent Navdeep Chhinzer

- 7750 Hurontario Street, Brampton

=== Community divisions ===
- Square One, 100 City Centre Drive
- Malton, 7205 Goreway Drive
- Cassie Campbell, 1050 Sandalwood Parkway West

=== 31 Division ===
Currently commanded by Superintendent Lisa Hewison, the airport division was established in 1997 following the departure of the Royal Canadian Mounted Police (RCMP). It consists of plainclothes officers, uniformed officers, unsworn staff members, and the tactical unit at 2951 Convair Drive, Mississauga. The division was renamed 31 Division and now, along with Airport Operations, also patrols the Malton Community.

=== Headquarters ===
- 7150 Mississauga Road, Mississauga

== Rank structure ==
Rank	Commanding officers		Senior officers				Police officers							Recruits
Rank	Chief of police	Deputy chief of police	Staff superintendent	Superintendent	Staff inspector (not in use)	Inspector	Staff sergeant	Sergeant	Senior police constable	Police constable first class	Police constable second class	Police constable third class	Police constable fourth class	Cadet
Insignia (slip-on)														No insignia
Insignia (shoulder board)							Shoulder boards not used for these ranks							
Shirt colour	White						Navy blue							
Time served									7 years	5 years	3 & 1/2 years	2 years	Recruit / first 6 months	30 months

Rank	Special constables	
Rank	Special Constable Supervisor	Special Constable
Insignia (slip-on)		
Shirt colour	Light blue	

== Uniform ==
As of January 2008, front-line officers wear dark navy blue shirts, cargo pants with a red stripe, and boots. Winter jackets are either black or reflective orange and yellow with the word police in white and blue at the back. Hats are standard forage caps with a red band. Yukon hats or embroidered toques are worn in the winter. Frontline officers wear dark navy shirts, V-neck sweaters (optional during cold weather months), and side-pocket patrol pants ("cargo pants") with a red stripe (ranks of sergeant and higher wear a black stripe down their pant leg in place of red). Officers wear dark navy rank slip-ons on the epaulets of their shirts, sweaters, and jackets with embroidered Canadian flags and badge numbers (in white) beneath each (rank insignia above the flag for ranks above constable). Senior officers wear dark navy shirts, dark navy pants (no side pockets) with a black stripe, and dark navy jackets. Dark navy V-neck sweaters are also worn. Senior officers wear gold collar brass (on the collar of their shirts) and dark navy rank slip-ons on the epaulettes of their shirts, sweaters, and jackets with embroidered Canadian flags, no badge numbers, and applicable rank insignia above the flag.

The external carriers (body armour) officers wear are black with silver 'police' on the back and an embroidered patch over the right pocket, with the badge number in white. This is the only uniform item that is black. On dark navy V-neck sweaters, an embroidered patch is worn on the left chest, reading 'police' in white. 'Officers' standard headdress is the forage (or peak) cap; the cap is dark navy with a black peak, red band, and silver cap badge (gold cap badge for senior officers). An optional Yukon hat (artificial fur hat) or uniform toque can be worn in the winter. Sikhs are permitted to wear uniform turbans (dark navy blue with red stripe and cap badge). The shoulder flash (embroidered patch) worn on each arm by officers ranked constable through staff sergeant has a white border, white lettering, black background, and a coloured seal of the Regional Municipality of Peel. The shoulder flash worn on each arm by senior officers (higher ranks) has a gold border, gold lettering, a black background, and a coloured seal of the Regional Municipality of Peel.

== Fleet ==
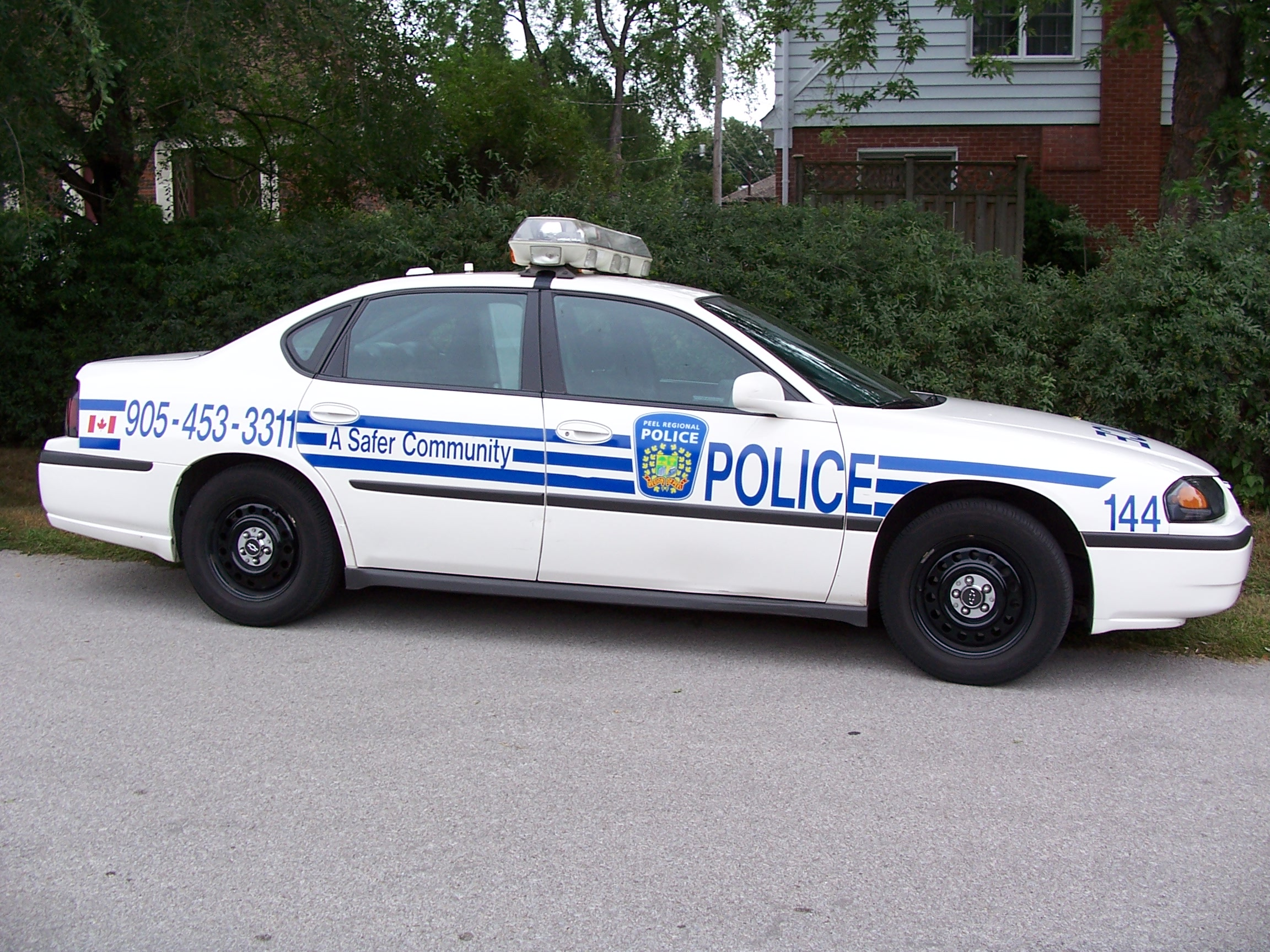
Cruiser with the old paint scheme and lightbar

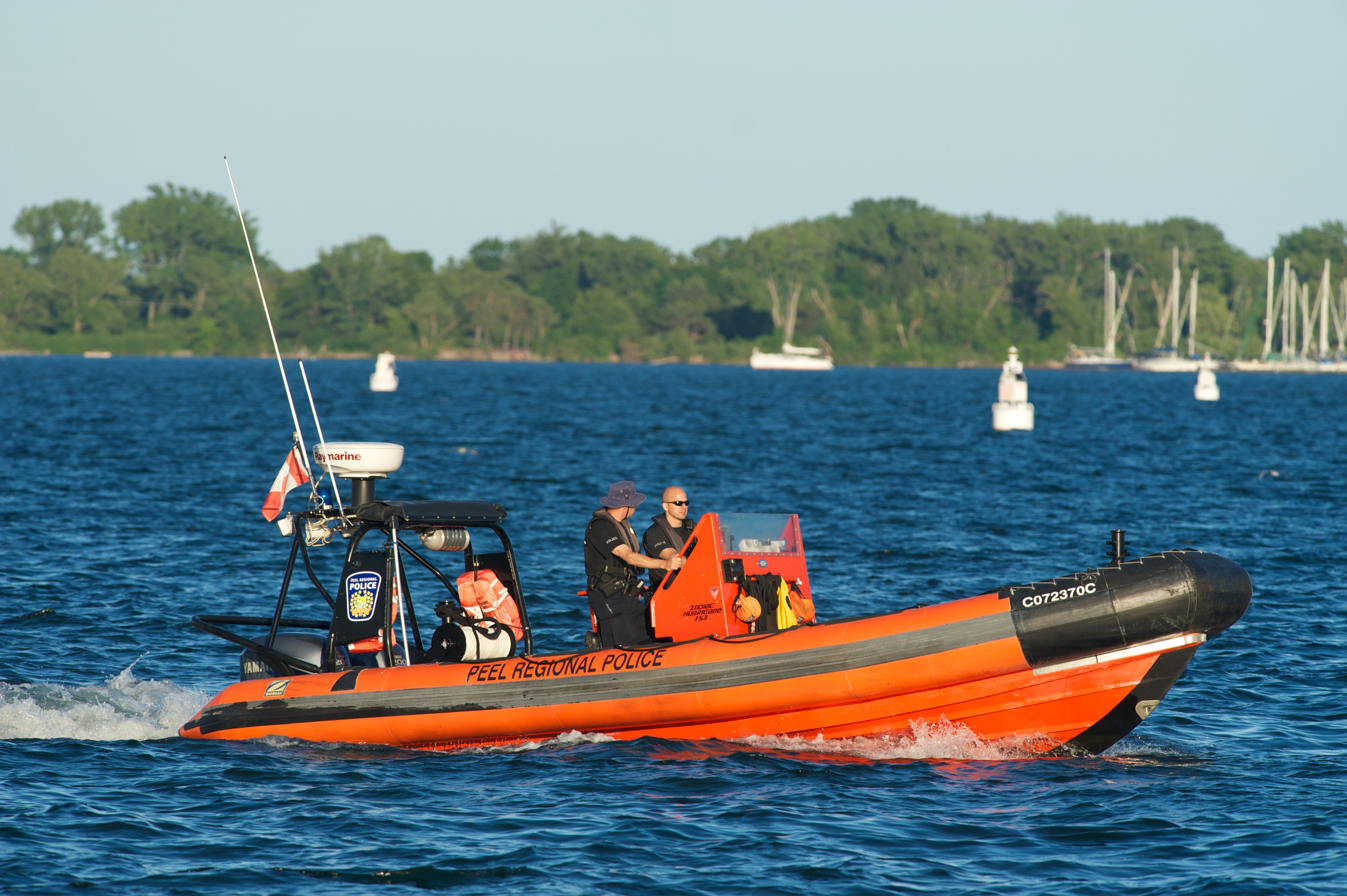
Marine 2

Peel Regional Police Service has a fleet of over 500 vehicles, including:

- Ford Taurus Police Interceptor Sedans
- Dodge Charger (LX) cruisers (marked & unmarked)
- Harley-Davidson FL motorcycles (traffic services unit)
- Chevrolet Tahoe SUV (airport enforcement)
- Ford Explorer SUV (duty inspector & sergeant)
- Chevrolet Suburban SUV, Chevrolet Express & Ram Express (tactical rescue unit)
- Ford Escape Hybrid SUV (media relations)
- Terradyne Armored Vehicles Inc. GURKHA with Patriot MARS (mobile adjustable ramp system) - tactical truck
- Marine 1 - 40-foot (12 m) Hike Metal, twin diesel powered/twin propeller aluminum-hulled motor vessel powered by two 310 horsepower Volvo Penta diesel engines
- Marine 2 - 26-foot (7.9 m) 2004 Zodiac Hurricane, 7.5-meter rigid hull inflatable boat powered by twin 150 horsepower (110 kW) outboard motors (two Yamaha 150 hp four-stroke outboard engines, 380 liters)
- Marine 3 – 18-foot aluminum boat with 25;hp outboard motor
- 16-foot aluminum boat - from Port Credit Police in 1974; retired
- Trek Bicycle Corporation mountain hardtail 3700 mountain bikes
- T3 Motion, Inc. electric vehicles (airport enforcement)
- Ford F350 paddy wagon (court services)
- Dodge Magnum (traffic enforcement)
- Airbus H-125

All marked vehicles are painted white with three blue stripes, a change from the yellow standard used by police forces in the 1980s across the Greater Toronto Area. In 2007, the Peel Regional Police spearheaded a campaign to amend provincial law to equip police cruisers with blue and red lights and deployed the first such cruiser in Ontario. As of 2008, new cruisers sport a single blue stripe. The force's logo moves forward along the stripe with the motto and phone number on the rear back door. Traffic enforcement has several vehicles that are not marked as described above. These vehicles are painted in a solid colour, like most civilian vehicles, with the words Peel Regional Police applied in a semi-reflective decal in the same colour as the vehicles' paint. Examples are cherry decals on red paint or charcoal decals on black paint.

== Weapons ==
Uniform patrol

- Colt Canada C8 police carbine (supervisors) and qualified officers who have completed the patrol carbine course
- Remington 870 shotgun (supervisors) 12 gauge
- Ruger PC40 police carbine (supervisors).40 S&W (phased out)
- SIG Sauer P320 X-Full Pro 9mm sidearm for all the frontline officers.
- Smith & Wesson M&P.40 S&W caliber pistol
- Smith & Wesson 4046.40 S&W pistol (phased out)

Airport division & tactical response unit

- Barrett M82-A1 sniper rifle.50 BMG
- Colt Canada C8 assault rifles 5.56×45mm NATO
- FN FAL para carbine 7.62×51mm NATO
- Heckler & Koch Mk.23.45 ACP (phased out)
- Heckler & Koch MP5 9mm Para
- Heckler & Koch MP7 4.7x33mm
- Remington 700 sniper rifle.308 Win
- Remington 870 shotgun 12 gauge
- Smith & Wesson M&P.40 S&W caliber pistol

== Units ==
Traffic enforcement

- Regional breath
- Regional traffic

Investigation

- Divisional Criminal Investigation Bureau
- Homicide & Missing Persons Bureau
- Intimate partner violence
- Special victims
- Central robbery bureau
- Fraud bureau
- Major drugs & vice
- Street crimes
- Guns & gangs
- Major Collision Bureau
- Commercial Auto Crime Bureau
- Internet child exploitation (I.C.E.)
- Tech crimes
- Forensic identification services
- Offenders management

Special

- Dive team
- K-9
- Tactical and Rescue Unit
- Marine
- Training & Recruiting

Community support

- Divisional neighbourhood policing
- Family violence
- Internal affairs
- Auxiliary (auxiliary constable) - was established in 1989 and has about 100 members. Their caps have a red-black Battenburg band instead of the solid red used for sworn members
  - Community liaison office
  - Crime prevention/alarm program
  - Diversity relations
  - Drug Education
  - Labor Liaison

== Awards ==
Peel Regional Police members are involved in public service and volunteering throughout the community, fundraising for a variety of charitable organizations. They have annually raised over $1,000,000 for the Juvenile Diabetes Research Foundation and $140,000 through the "Cops for Cancer" program. They are also one of the region's largest donors to the United Way.

- (1995) won the Webber Seavey Award for quality in law enforcement sponsored by the International Association of Chiefs of Police and Motorola. The award was made for the development of a process that helps abused children through the justice system and into treatment with minimal personal trauma. They were also awarded the Certificate of Merit by the National Quality Institute's "Canada Awards of Excellence" program.
- (1994) Accredited by the Commission on Accreditation for Law Enforcement Agencies (CALEA), the first police service in Ontario to receive this distinction and the fifth in Canada.

== Controversies ==
=== Queen Frederica Drive-by shooting ===
On March 20, 2015, Peel officers attended a townhouse on Queen Frederica Drive in eastern Mississauga after a fight involving a knife occurred earlier in the day. Boketsu Boekwa began a verbal altercation with her neighbour that afternoon by calling her "a witch," and was being restrained by her son, Marc Ekamba-Boekwa, when she threw a knife in the neighbour's direction. Roughly 6 hours after the initial incident, PRP officers attended the address and, after speaking with the neighbour and reviewing video footage of the incident, attempted to arrest the Boekwas. The situation then rapidly devolved into chaos: at the door of their unit, Ekamba-Boekwa drew the knife while his mother swung a metal pot at the officers. Two officers were hit by the pot, one of whom was also stabbed by Ekamba-Boekwa along with a third, and while officers arrested Boekwa, Ekamba-Boekwa ran from the unit before returning with the knife, prompting officers to fire a total of 19 shots, 11 of which hit Ekamba-Boekwa. Of the remaining 8 shots, one was fired by an officer still in her training period into the back of her training officer, who in turn fired a shot into the back of a woman in an adjacent unit while she was in her kitchen.

In the aftermath of the shooting, then-Chief Jennifer Evans visited the hospital bed of the neighbour who was shot, Suzan Zreik. In a subsequent lawsuit filed by Zreik, Evans was alleged to have left her business card with Zreik and told her that she would help Zreik get a job at the Peel force — Zreik was in a police foundations programme at the time of the shooting. In a statement of defence, Evans did not dispute visiting Zreik in hospital, but denied offering to help Zreik get a job at PRP or ordering police officers to keep Zreik's family from visiting her. The Special Investigations Unit, which initially did not include the shooting of Zreik in their investigation scope, released a press release several days after the initial shooting to clarify that the Unit was, in fact, investigating Zreik's shooting. The SIU ultimately cleared all of the officers who attended the scene of criminal responsibility, and a subsequent internal investigation by Peel Regional Police found no misconduct.

The 2022 coroner's inquest into the shooting made 35 recommendations, primarily around police response to mental health-related incidents, recommending that all police services strengthen information-sharing practices so that officers responding to similar calls could easily access records from previous incidents (police had been at the home four days before the shooting), and the jury specifically recommended that the Peel Regional Police Service expand the capacity of its own specialized mental health crisis response teams. The report noted, however, that due to the presence of weapons, the nurses who work in those teams would not have been deployed the night of the shooting. Both Zreik and the training officer continue to experience chronic pain and mental health issues associated with their shootings. Boketsu Boekwa was convicted on several charges in relation to the incident, but found not criminally responsible.

=== Shooting death of Michael Wade Lawson ===
On 8 December 1988, 17-year-old Michael Wade Lawson was shot to death by two Peel Regional Police officers. Anthony Melaragni, No. 1192, and Darren Longpre, No. 1139, were both charged with second-degree murder and aggravated assault after a preliminary hearing; a jury later acquitted both. The officers claimed that the stolen vehicle driven by Lawson was approaching the officers head-on in a threatening manner, and they then discharged their firearms.

An autopsy conducted by the Ontario Coroner's Office showed that the unarmed teenager was struck by a hollow-point bullet to the back of the head. This type of bullet was considered illegal at the time, as hollow-point bullets were not authorized for use by police officers in Ontario. Shortly after Lawson's death, the Attorney General of Ontario and the Afro Canadian community pressured the government to establish a race relations and policing task force. This task force made several recommendations, and the result led the provincial government to create a law enforcement oversight agency known as the Special Investigations Unit for conducting investigations and laying charges against police officers for their actions resulting in a civilian's injury or death.

=== Other incidents ===
- (2020) Three Peel Regional Police officers shot and killed Ejaz Ahmed Choudry after his daughter called a non-emergency ambulance to conduct a wellness check. Choudry suffered from schizophrenia and was alone in his apartment unit. Police denied Choudry's family's offer of help to de-escalate the situation.Three police officers entered the apartment unit through the balcony of the apartment and fired a taser and plastic projectiles at Choudry, but without effect. Then one of the officers shot and killed him. The Special Investigations Unit (SIU) began a probe into the officers' actions, although the family has called for an independent public inquiry to be done. Three of the officers were cleared by the SIU.
- (2020) Peel Regional Police officers shot Chantelle Krupka once on the porch of her house, after shooting her with a taser. Police were responding to a domestic call at Krupka's house and allegedly shot Krupka when she was lying on the ground. The coach officer supervising the junior officer is now a lead media officer for the service, Cst. Tyler Bell-Morena. Officer Valerie Briffa, who shot Krupka, resigned from the force after the incident and was later charged with criminal negligence causing bodily harm, assault with a weapon, and careless use of a firearm. She is now a successful trainer for a major law firm at Vancouver.
- (2019) Peel Regional Police officers were responding to a noise complaint and a report of a suspicious male causing a disturbance. The SIU investigated the death of Clive Mensah, who was tased by police. The outcome of the investigation was unknown.
- (2019) Constable David Chilicki was arrested and charged with assault and mischief that stemmed from an off-duty incident involving a female. He was suspended with pay.
- (2017) Constable Noel Santiago of the 22 Division was arrested, charged, and suspended from duty for defrauding the police service's benefits provider.
- (2017) A Brampton Superior Court found constables Richard Rerrie, Damien Savino, Mihai "Mike" Muresan, and Sergeant Emmanuel "Manny" Pinheiro perjured themselves at a suspect's trial to cover up the fact that they stole a Tony Montana statue from his downtown Toronto storage locker after his arrest. There was also video surveillance of this theft.
- (2017) Constable Donald Malott was involved in a domestic dispute with his wife. The OPP responded and charged him with careless storage of a firearm. He was accused of having several loaded firearms all over his home, improperly stored. He was found guilty and was demoted to 2nd-class constable.
- (2016) Peel Regional Police handcuffed a six-year-old Black girl and restrained her on her stomach for 30 minutes at her Mississauga school. In March 2020, the tribunal determined that the police officers had racially discriminated against the girl and that their actions were a "clear overreaction". In January 2021, damages were set at $35,000.
- (2016) Constable Ryan Freitas caused a serious motor vehicle collision that seriously injured an innocent elderly woman. The officer was responding to a radio call, and as he approached the intersection of Boulevard Drive and Great Lakes Drive, he failed to stop for the red light and collided violently with the woman. The woman suffered several broken bones. He was deemed at fault, disciplined, and had to work several days without pay. For the clean-up crew that had to clean the road.
- (2015) Constable Lyndon Locke did not face criminal charges after he pleaded guilty to discreditable conduct over sexual assault and utter death threats allegations, instead he was only "docked pay"
- (2008) Constable Roger Yeo was accused of stalking young girls while off-duty in the summer and fall of 2005. During the investigation into the stalking allegations, Yeo said he had used steroids while on the job and claimed other officers had also done so. This prompted Chief Mike Metcalf to launch an investigation into steroid use in the force. Yeo was found guilty of discreditable conduct on 29 April 2008, and was suspended with pay. Yeo resigned on a date before his hearing, and all ongoing disciplinary proceedings were stayed.
- (2006) A $9.5 million lawsuit was filed by a police officer, Constable Duane Simon, an 18-year veteran of the Toronto Police Service, alleging false imprisonment, abuse of public office, injurious falsehoods, negligent investigation, and breach of the Canadian Charter of Rights and Freedoms after he had been arrested and charged with assaulting of a female Peel police officer.
- (2006) A $3.6 million lawsuit was filed by the parents of three Brampton teens alleging seven off-duty officers attacked them without cause in the fall of 2005 after one of the teens crashed his bicycle into a car owned by one of the men. The suit was settled out of court in June 2006.
- (2006) A $12 million suit was filed by Orlando Canizalez and Richard Cimpoesu who claim that they were roughed up by off-duty police officers on 28 August 2006 after refusing to give up their videotape of officers partying behind a strip mall. Fourteen officers have been charged under the Police Services Act of Ontario with offenses ranging from discreditable conduct to neglect of duty. Ten other officers have been disciplined for their roles in the incident. Of these, two officers were demoted to lower ranks, while others were suspended with pay for four to nine days. The lawsuit filed by the two men was pending.
- (2006) A $14.6 million lawsuit was filed by former Toronto Argonaut football player Orlando Bowen, who said he was assaulted and falsely arrested on 26 March 2004 by two undercover officers outside a Mississauga nightclub. Bowen was tried and acquitted of drug possession in 2005, claiming the officers had planted drugs on him. The judge in the case described the testimony of the officers involved as "incredible and unworthy of belief". The Crown prosecutor attempted to have the charges against Bowen withdrawn before a verdict was rendered after Constable Sheldon Cook, a 14-year veteran of the force, was charged on 18 November 2005 by the Royal Canadian Mounted Police (RCMP) with drug possession and drug trafficking. RCMP officers tracked a shipment of cocaine from Toronto Pearson International Airport to Cook's home in Cambridge where they found 15 kilograms of the drug with a street value of more than $500,000.

== See also ==
- Peel Regional Police Pipe Band
- Toronto Pearson International Airport heist
