= Limehouse, Ontario =

Limehouse
- Unincorporated community
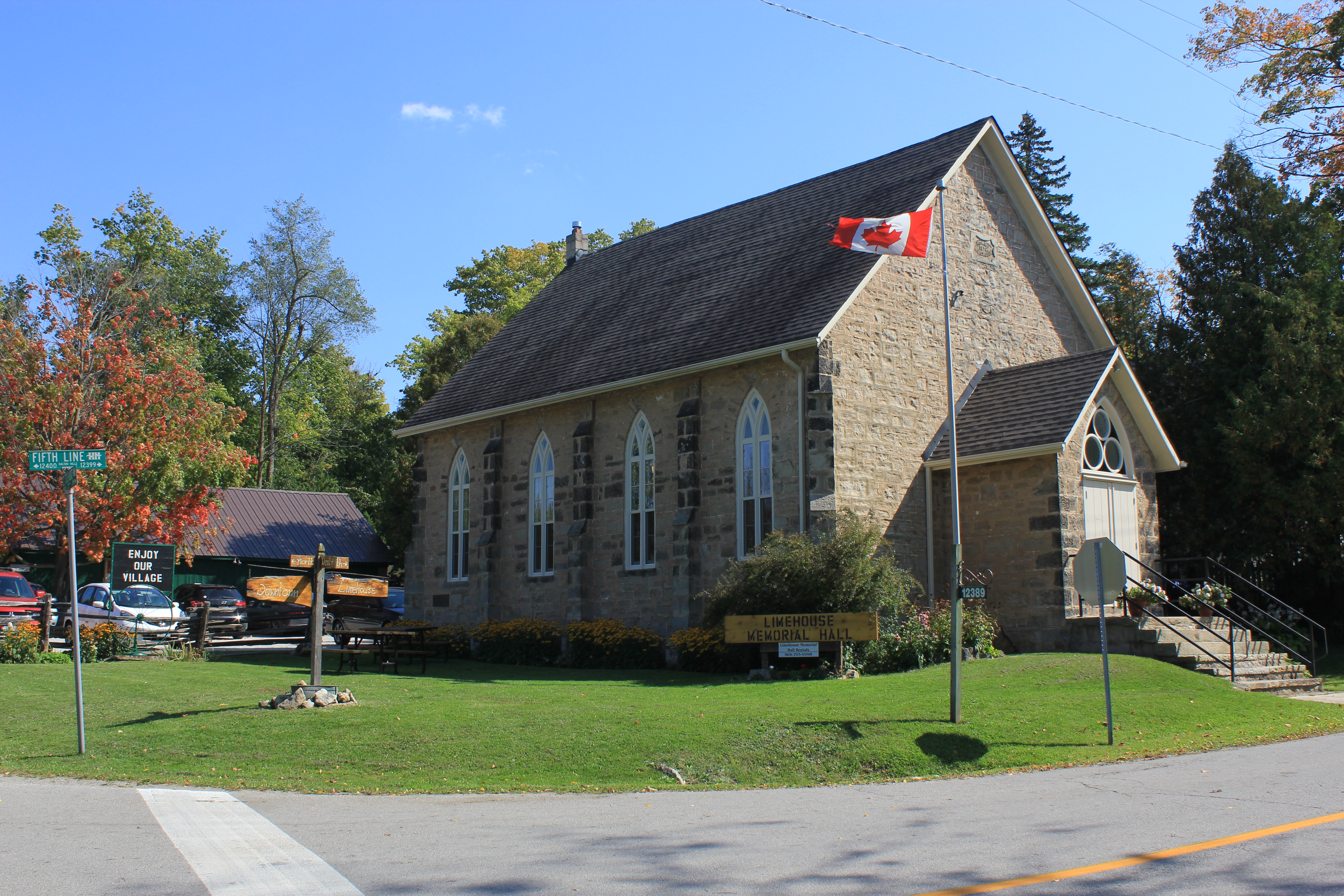
- Memorial Hall

- Location within Regional Municipality of Halton Location within Southern Ontario
- Coordinates: 43°38′11″N 79°58′46″W
- Country: Canada
- Province: Ontario
- Regional municipality: Halton
- Town: Halton Hills
- Time zone: UTC−05:00 (EST)
  - Summer (DST): UTC−04:00 (EDT)
- Forward sortation area: L0P 1H0
- Area codes: 905, 289 and 519
- NTS Map: 030M12
- GNBC Code: FBXQM

Limehouse is a community in the Town of Halton Hills in southern Ontario, Canada. It has a population of about 800 people and its closest neighbours are Georgetown and Acton. Limehouse has many hills, trails and even a small school.

== Limehouse Public School ==
Limehouse school is a small school which has an enrollment of fewer than 100 children from junior kindergarten through grade 5. Limehouse competes with schools in the surrounding area in sports, such as track-and-field, cross-country, and volleyball. The school itself is small, with one hallway and a gymnasium.

== The Bruce Trail ==
This is the main attraction for the small community of Limehouse. The Bruce Trail is a hiking trail in Ontario that runs from Queenston on the Niagara River, to Tobermory on the Bruce Peninsula in Lake Huron. The over 800 km (500 mi) long trail follows the course of the Niagara Escarpment, often along its edge. Many parts of the trail go unused, although the Limehouse entrance sees a lot of tourism.

=== History ===
The Bruce trail contains the very reason Limehouse is a place on the map today: the kilns. Best accessed through the Limehouse Conservation Area the lime kilns can be found throughout the Limehouse section of the Bruce Trail. The kilns are slowly deteriorating because of age. However, the largest of them, a draw kiln, is currently being restored.

A train station used to exist near the entrance of the Bruce Trail, and the earthen siding can be seen on the south side of the tracks, just east of the one lane car bridge that spans the rail road tracks. The rail bed for the former Toronto Suburban Railway can be seen about a kilometer west of the bridge on 22nd Side Road where it used to cross the road. The rail bed runs behind the gun club and east where it crossed 5th Line and the wood pilings can be seen in what used to be the head pond in what is now the Credit Valley Conservation Limehouse Park. The head pond is just some north of the Hole in the Wall feature of the Bruce Trail. On satellite maps of the area, you can if you look closely, trace the track-bed of the radial railway all the way back to Georgetown.

There are also caves and multiple crevices along the Bruce Trail. There are bridges and ladders leading throughout some parts of the trail and designated biking sections.

== Economy ==
=== Agriculture ===
There are many farms and fields located in Limehouse. On 4th Line there is the Mountainview Farm which is run by a single family. They race a few of their 35 horses at Woodbine Racetrack and have wild boar at their farm. This is only one example of the many other similar families. There are also riding lessons provided on 17th Sideroad, provided by a family farm.

=== Activities ===
There is a community centre located in the heart of Limehouse, just around the corner from Limehouse School. Events are held at the time of holidays throughout the year, as well as for various community functions.

=== Quarries ===
There are quarries throughout Limehouse in which people have mined limestone for more than a century.
