= Peel Art Gallery, Museum and Archives =

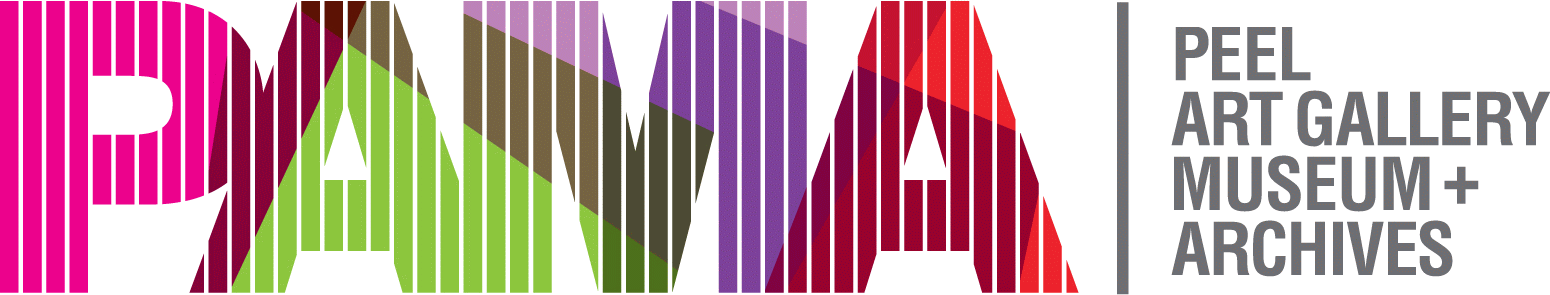
- Established: November 1968
- Location: Brampton, Ontario, Canada
- Coordinates: 43.68516°N 79.75712°W
- Type: museum/art gallery/archives for the Peel Region
- Public transit access: Brampton Transit (Hurontario), various GO bus routes
- Website: pama.peelregion.ca

The Peel Art Gallery, Museum and Archives (PAMA) is a museum, art gallery, and archives for the Regional Municipality of Peel and are located in Brampton, Ontario, Canada. Previously, it was the Peel Heritage Complex. Its facilities were originally the Peel County Courthouse, Brampton Jail (also known as the Peel County Gaol), a land registry office, and a county administration building. It is opposite Gage Park and Brampton City Hall.

In March 2010, the Peel Heritage Complex closed for extensive renovations and expansion. The spaces reopened in 2012, with significantly larger and include more public space. It was originally scheduled to reopen in fall 2011. The facility rebranded as Peel Art Gallery, Museums and Archives.

== History ==
The first attempts to create a historical society were apparently in the early 20th century; the issue went nowhere. For many years, the William Perkins Bull collection of art and artifacts was housed in the Brampton High School. In the 1950s, the Board of the school decided to renovate and redecorate, and asked the collection be removed. Bull Collection publisher C. V. Charters, Everett Briggs, Alex McKinney and other citizens moved to create a historical society, focused on life in Peel County from the late 18th century to the 1930s. There was an apparent disinterest in heritage, during the immediate post-War era, and the Peel County Historical Society Association became inactive in 1957.

In February 1961, interested citizens met in the basement of the Carnegie Library to discuss reorganization; Mrs. Carroll was elected president. Association chairman Don Featherstone and a committee (which included Russell Cooper) met in March 1961, to establish a constitution. The County Council of Peel allowed the organization use of the basement of the old Registry Office on Wellington, for its meetings. Regular meetings began in 1962, and included an address by "Mr. Colucci", designer of the Black Creek Pioneer Village in north Toronto.

With aid of the Women's Institutes of Snelgrove and Cheltenham, an art exhibition was held in an old school house, on the 3rd Line, in the west half of Chinguacousy. Meant to raise funds for the creation of a museum and art gallery, it featured artworks by prominent local artists, and items from the Bull Collection. A temporary home for the collection was found in 1963, at the Credit Valley Conservation Authority offices. Thousands attended the weekend exhibits, but the structure wasn't winterproof. Thomas H. B. Symons, "custodian" of the Bull Collection, was enlisted later on that year.

In 1963, the organization became an affiliate of the Ontario Historical Society oncemore, and displayed during the fall at the International Ploughing Match, held in Caledon by Colonel Conn Smythe. The society tried to gain access to Hawthorne Lodge, the original home of the Bull family, on what is now Kennedy Road. Enlisted to help was the founding President of Trent University, Thomas H. B. Symons, who is the "custodian" of the Bull Collection. Funds were not then available, but Symons provided various rural artifacts from Peel, some of which have been restored and displayed.

Peel County Council passed a 1966 resolution, stating that the Registry Office be vacated by county employees, and be available for the society to set up a museum.

The official opening took place November 17, 1968, featuring professional designed exhibits and displays, "a very fine variation from the more frequently encountered county museums", according to a 1973 text on the Society. Museum displays focused on the rural past and technical present of the area. The gallery's initial exhibit was of a Brampton watercolourist and an Alton sculptor.

In 1984, the Region of Peel took over the facility. Architect Carlos Ventin of The Ventin Group was hired to design a renovation of the Peel County Jail and Peel County Registry Office, including a connecting building.

The architecture won awards for The Ventin Group at the 1986 City of Brampton Award of Excellence, Development Design Awards and at 1987 Ontario Renews Award from the Ministry of Housing for Non-residential Renovation (Public Sector).

Noting the abundance of pioneer-era exhibits at Ontario museums, curator Bill Barber aimed to feature historical topics like the Great Depression. The approach drew criticism from some patrons, who lived through the era. A show themed to Christmas around the world eventually was reformatted to include other festivals at that time of the year, and another exhibit looked at Ukrainian Christianity around the world.

Attendance grew from 6000 in 1985, to 18000 in 1987, and 24000 in 1989.

== Buildings ==
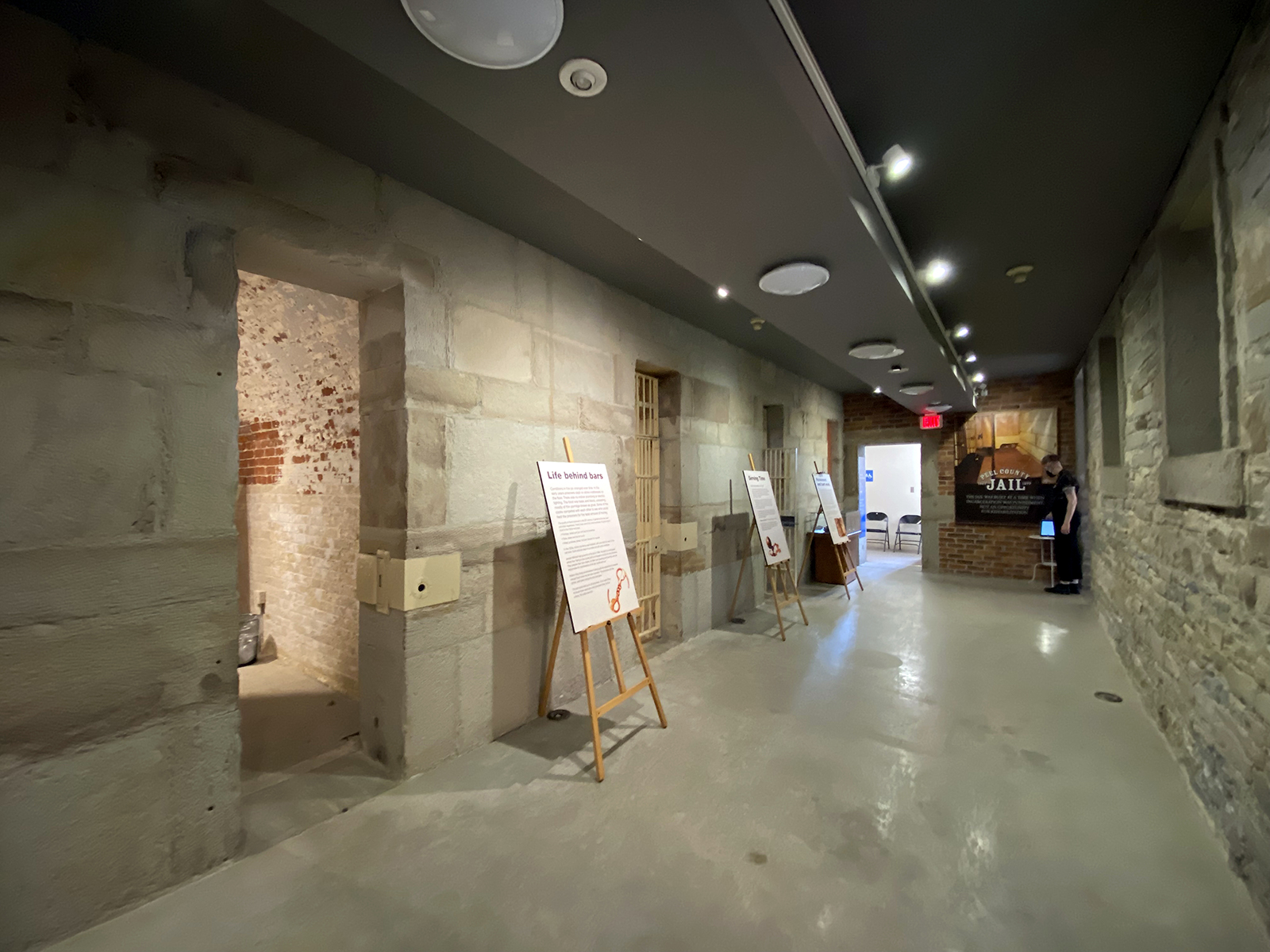
Historic jail

Toronto-based Goldsmith Borgal and Company Ltd. Architects designed PAMA's 2010-2012 renovations.

=== Tunnel ===
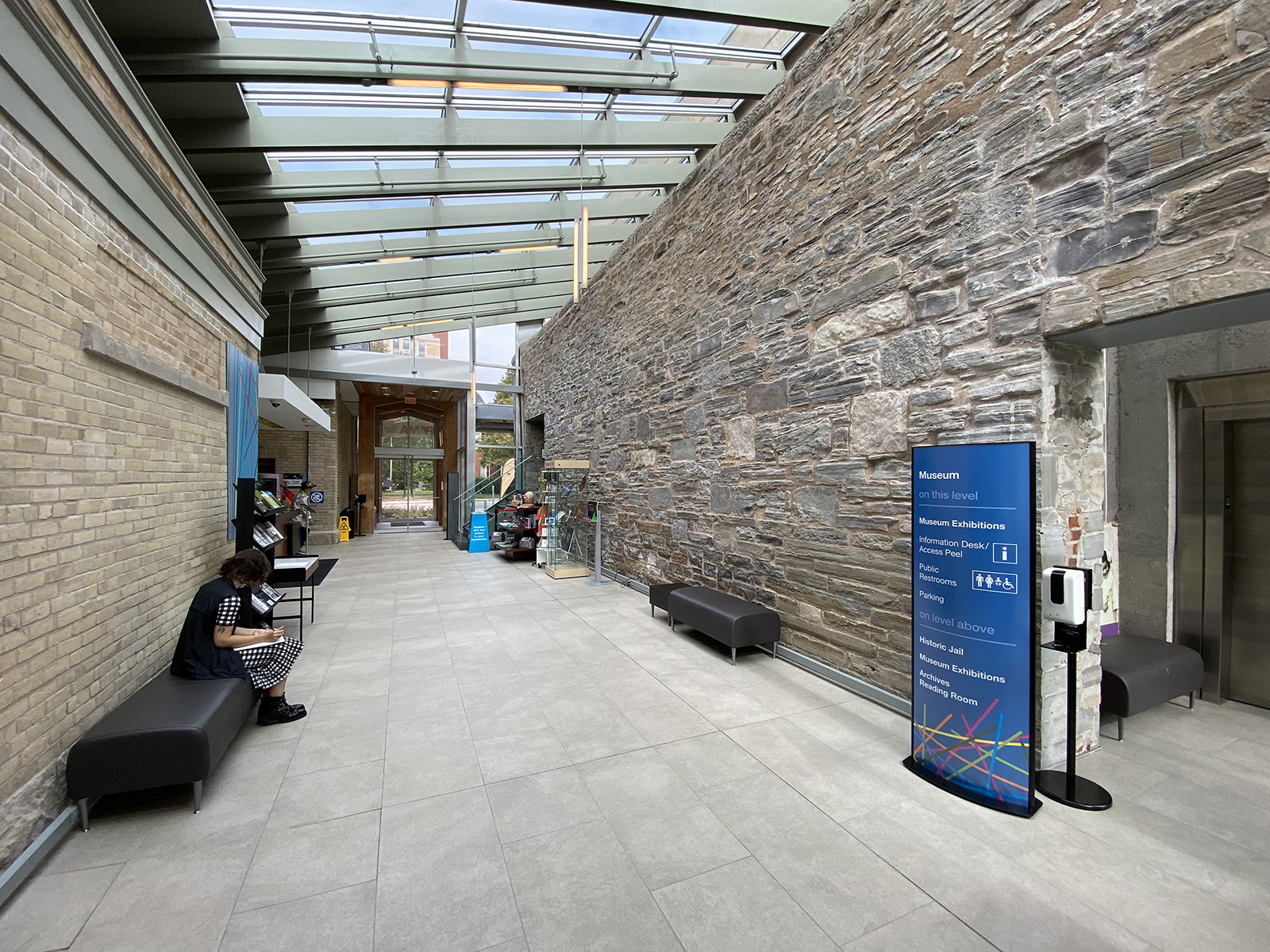
Museum Lobby wall divided into two section

The two sets of buildings are connected by an 82-metre-long tunnel, with two skylights. One enters within the art gallery building (1958), the tunnel passes partially under the 1867 Peel County Courthouse, and into a 1986 link structure, joining the 1867 Peel County Jail and the 1890s registry office. A late addition to development plans, it required significant underpinning of the buildings, including the jail courtyard walls. To construct the tunnel, items such as a geothermal ground source system were forced to reschedule.

The tunnel was built by the project's general contractor, Dixon Construction, and designed by Ojdrovic Engineering.

== Sections ==
=== Museum ===
The museum collection of the Peel Heritage Complex comprises approximately 12,000 artefacts representing the history of Peel from 4000 BCE to the 21st century. Highlights of the collection include objects associated with the Avro Canada CF-105 Arrow aircraft and its design, a collection of over 360 pieces of 19th century stoneware, and a large textile collection that includes locally made quilts and over 18,000 pieces of clothing.

The Peel Heritage Complex presents a variety of exhibitions with historical and cultural significance to the Peel community. In the Region of Peel Museum, visitors can travel from early Aboriginal settlements through the Jet Age, all within the walls of an historic Jail building. Artifacts, archival documents, interactive elements and hands-on activities tell “The Peel Story”. Upon their 2011 reopening, the museum will have increased exhibition space.

The Brain Cell allowed for hands-on learning exhibits; this room will be renamed in the new museum.

Recent exhibitions of the permanent collection include All Dressed Up With Somewhere To Go (clothing, 2009–2010), Arctic Zoo (Inuit art, 2007–2009), and Connections, two exhibits held in coordination with Canadians and Their Pasts CURA (Community University Research Alliance), featuring items the community is keeping for future generations of their family.

=== Archives ===
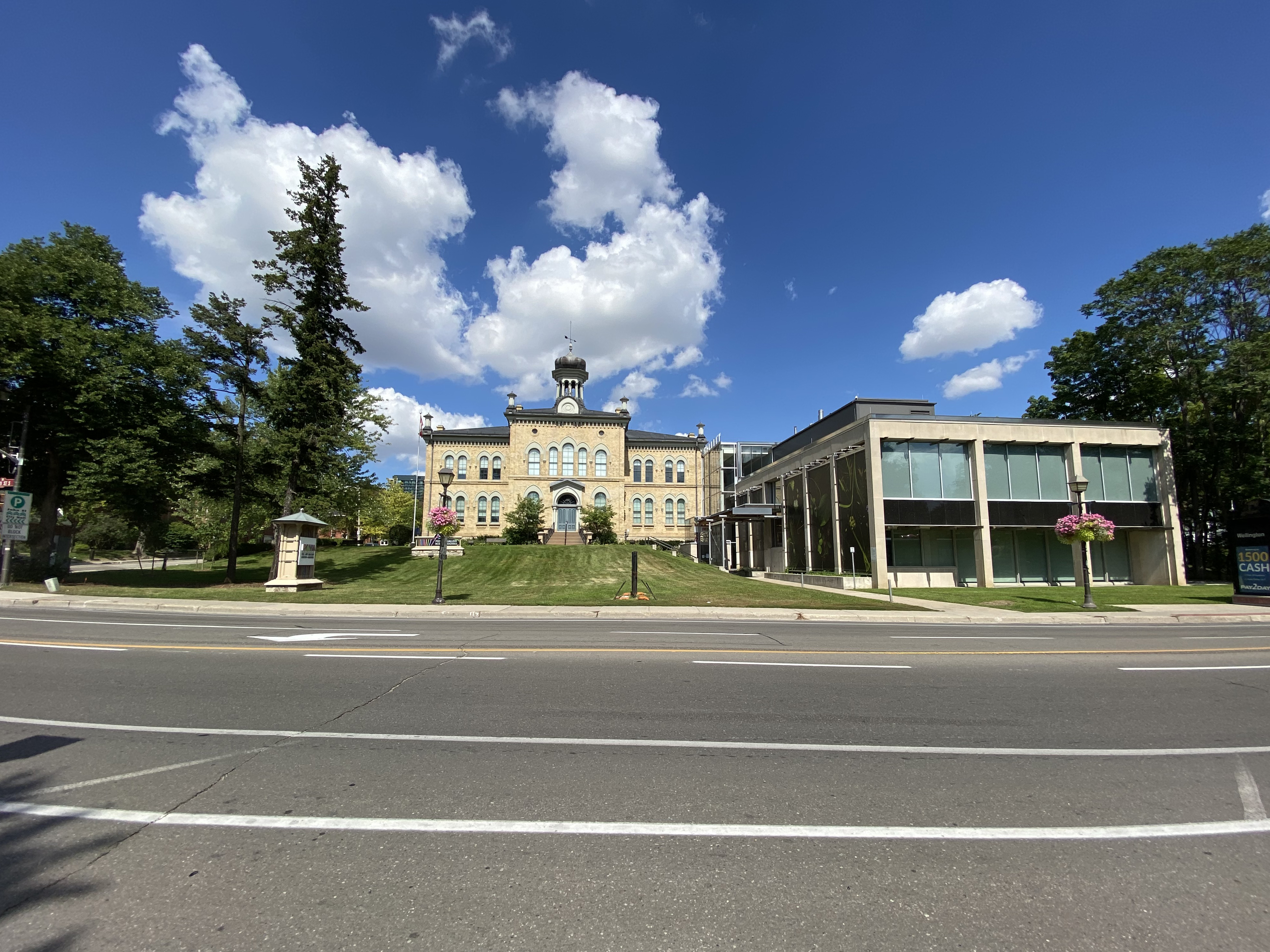
One of the PAMA buildings, formerly the Peel County Court House

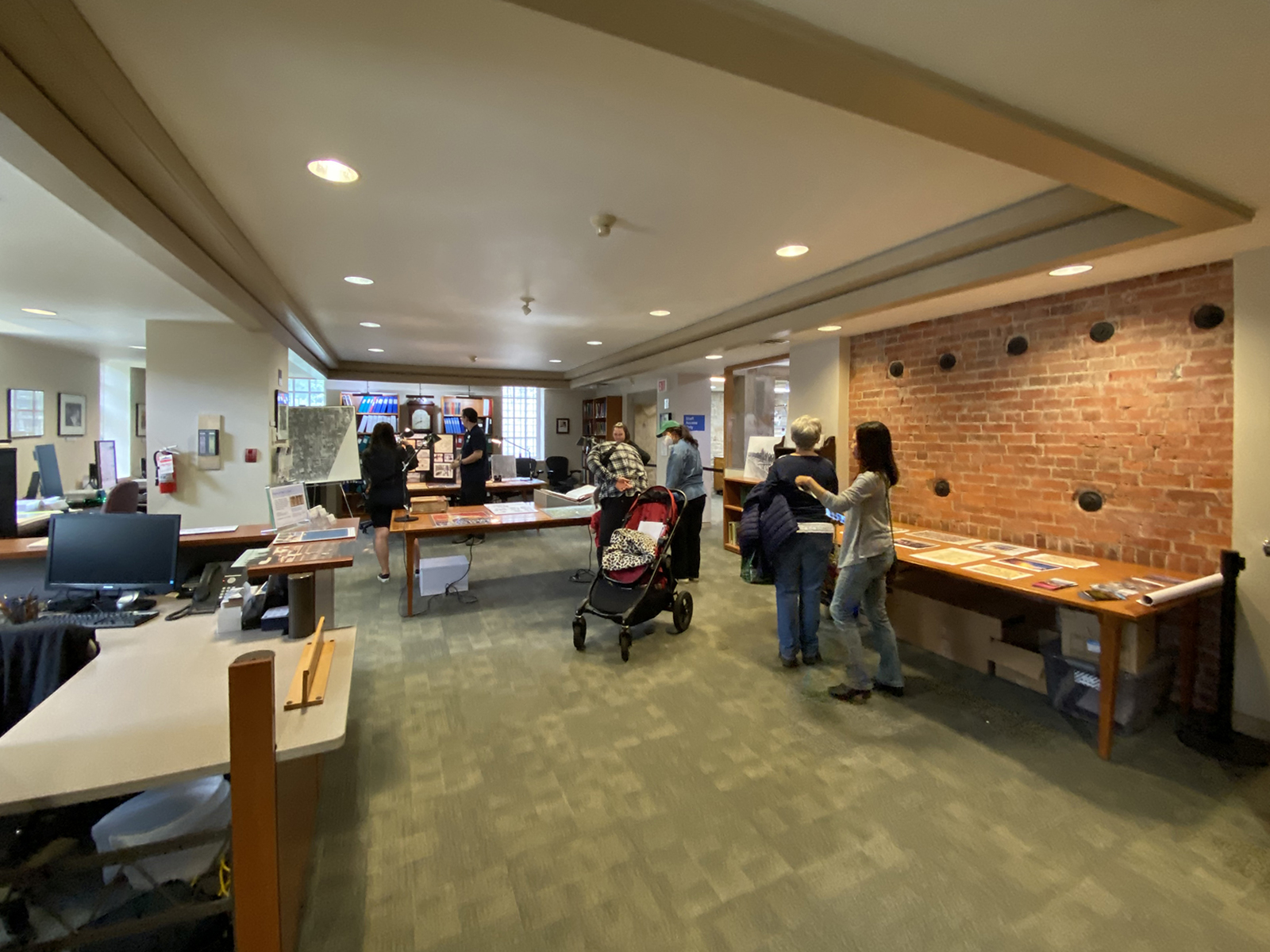
Archives Reading Room

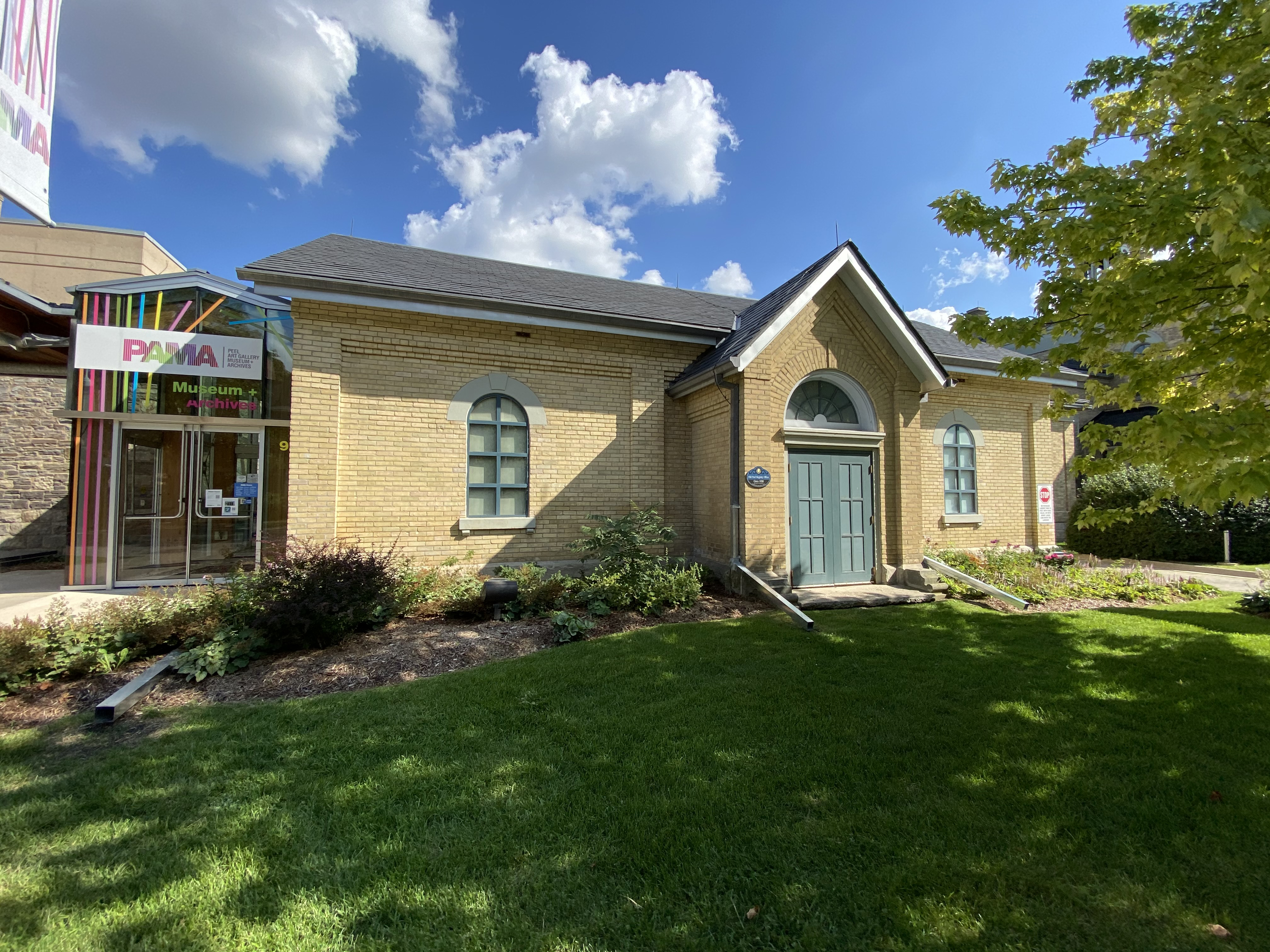
Peel Registry Office

Primarily, the Region of Peel Archives collection includes municipal documents for the Region of Peel, City of Brampton, City of Mississauga, and Town of Caledon, and the former County of Peel. Also includes records from the former townships: Albion, Caledon, Chinguacousy, Toronto Gore and Toronto. Included are by-laws, minutes, planning documents, land records, assessment and collectors rolls, committee records, etc.

Beyond these municipal documents, the archives collects documentary material related to the history of Peel, and the individuals and groups that have helped in developing the community. Major photography collections include newspaper photographer Russell K. Cooper, commercial photographers Cecil Chinn and Cecil Henry, the Luker family collection, and glass negative collections from Robertson Matthews, the Brampton portrait studio, and the McLeod family.

The Region of Peel Archives also houses the records of various organizations, including the Bruce Trail Conservancy.

The reading room offers microfilm of family history files from the William Perkins Bull collection, select area newspapers, land records, census records from 1851/52-1911, Peel County Wills and Surrogate Court records, the "Tweedsmuir histories" of the local Women's Institutes, et cetera. Various genealogical publications, such as family histories, newspaper indexes, cemetery transcriptions as well as a selection of local history books are available.

=== Art Gallery ===
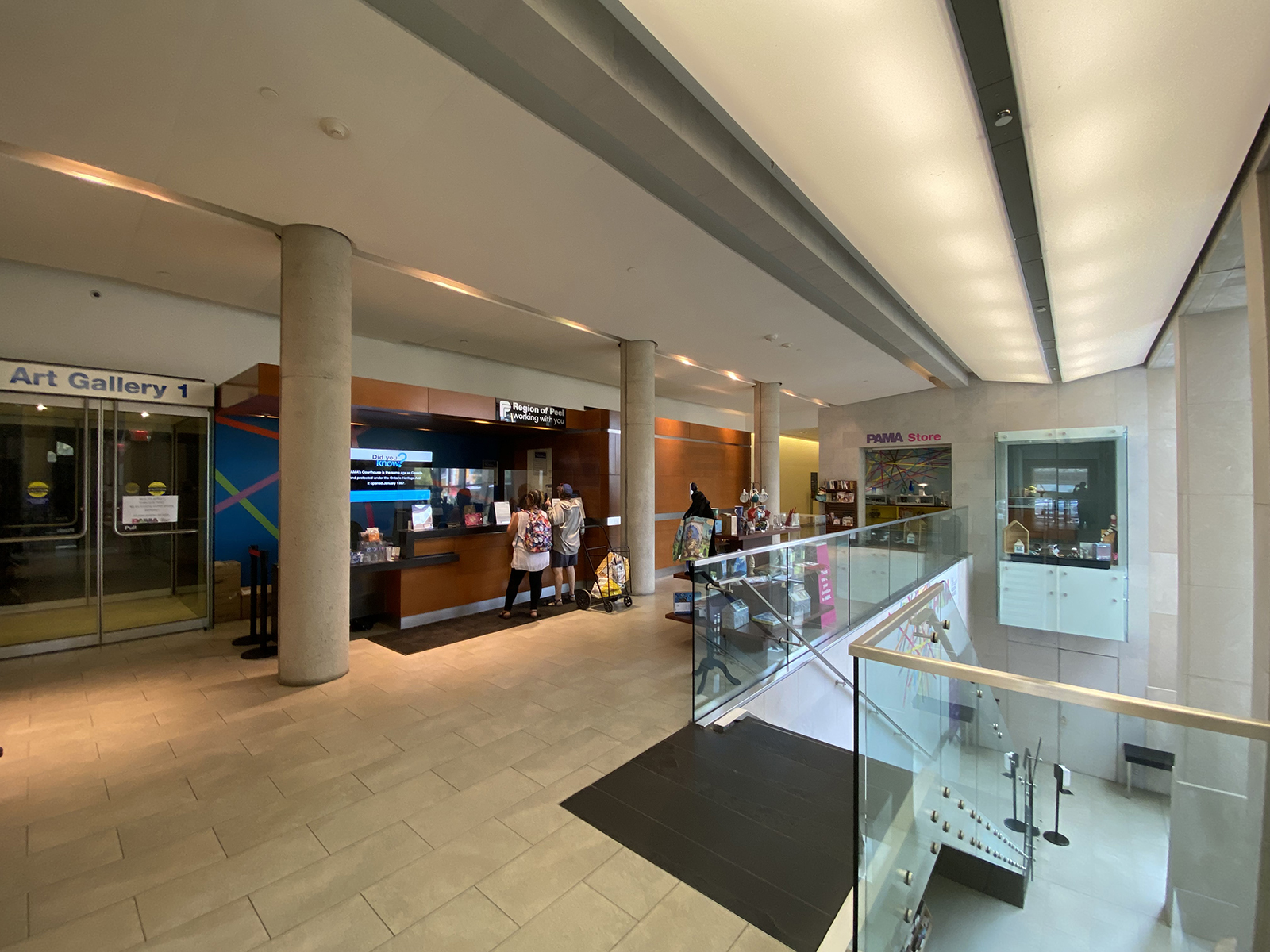
Art Gallery Lobby

The permanent collection, including over 4000 contemporary and historic works, is the largest such public collection in the region. Since opening in 1968, the art gallery has exhibited local, national, and international artists, both contemporary and historical from their permanent collection.

==== Permanent collection ====
The gallery's collection originally was focused on artists of local residence and art of local subject matter. The earliest exhibits were of watercolourist George Chauvignaud, a painter from Peel in the 1920s and 1930s, as well as a show of Brampton-born printmaker Caroline Armington, based on a donation by Caroline Crawford.

In more recent decades, the collection has expanded to include several hundred works, from throughout the development of 20th century abstraction in Canada. The selection includes works by early movements, such as Les Automatistes and Painters Eleven, and contemporary figures in non-objective painting, such as David Urban and Ric Evans. Other artists noted in gallery materials include Harold Town, Jack Bush, Claude Tousignant, Guido Molinari, Ron Martin, Chris Cran, William Ronald, John Meredith, and Ronald Bloore; the final three in the list were once Brampton residents.

The collection includes various major works by national-level artists, designated with the Canadian Cultural Property status.

Artists mentioned in publicity for the gallery include John Anderson, Caroline Armington, Frank Armington, John Armstrong, Carl Beam, George Broomfield, Alex Cameron, Chuck Close, Tom Dean, Mary Dignam, Leonard J. Hutchinson, Tom LaPierre, Doris McCarthy, David Milne, Robert Motherwell, Will Ogilvie, Stephanie Rayner, Jim Reid, Jack Shadbolt, Michael Snow, Stanley Spencer, Tom Stone, Andy Warhol, and Joyce Weiland. A Tom Thomson sketchbook is included in the collection.

==== Exhibitions ====
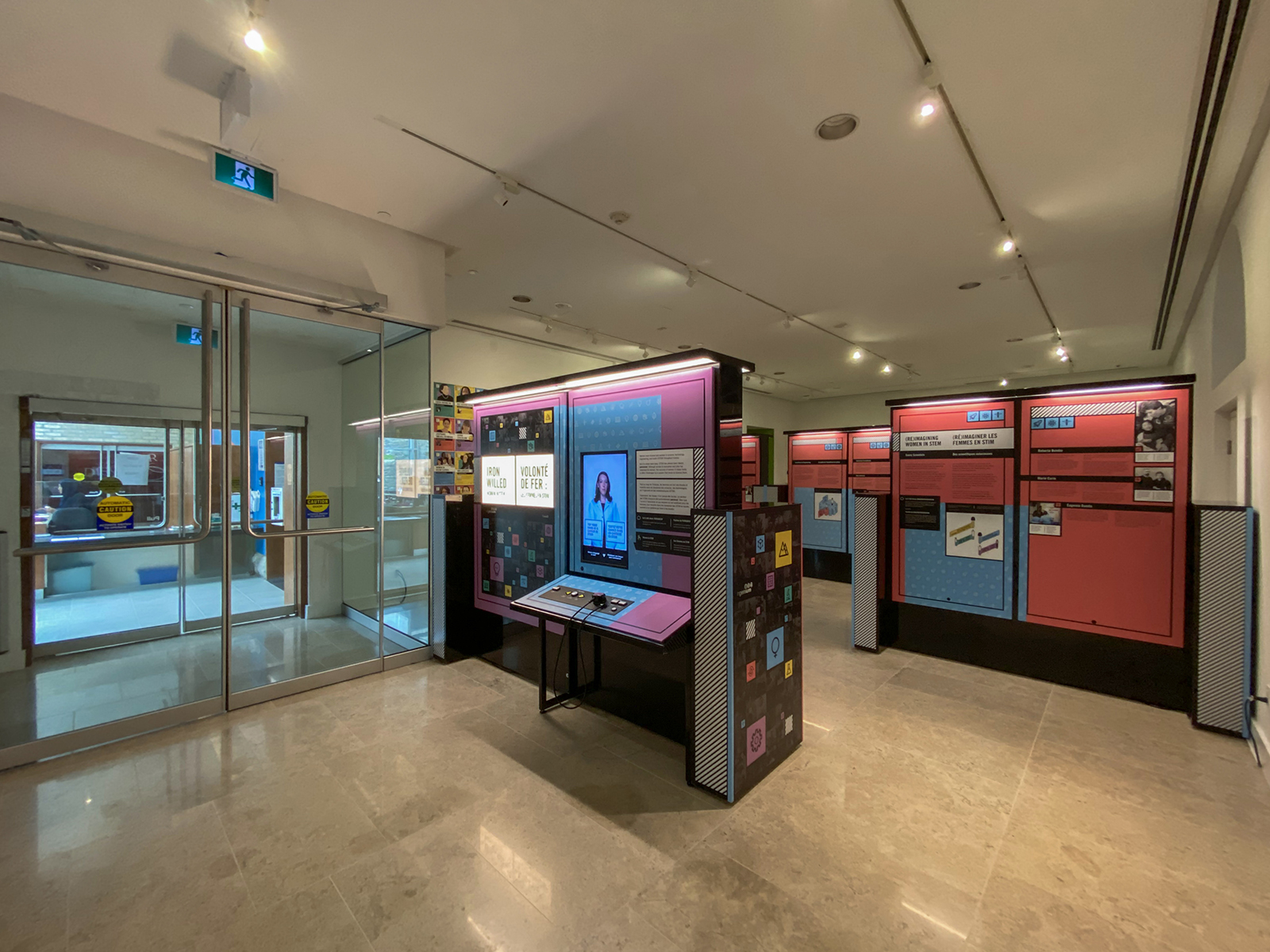
Exhibit

Recent exhibitions include:

- Painted In Peel: The Peel Landscape by the Group of Seven and Their Contemporaries, featuring works from the permanent collection, and those of the McMichael Canadian Art Collection, the Art Gallery of Ontario (2004)
- Site-specific exterior projection work Wyn Geleynse: The Peel Projection, by installation artist Wyn Geleynse (November and December 2009);

In the 1970s, the gallery created a juried art show, attracting entries from across Ontario, there is no word whether or not the show will return. The gallery also has the Peel Artists Series, featuring local and regional artists.

=== Education and outreach ===
School programming is available at the museum and gallery, and at the schools themselves. Seniors programs, which go out to old-age facilities, feature broader history and art-related topics, not necessarily focused around Peel. In 2009, the education program had almost eleven thousand students, and almost six thousand seniors.

== Etc. ==
=== Collections ===
The Peel Heritage Complex collects a wide variety of objects including: 19th and early 20th century artifacts from everyday tools and gadgets to wedding dresses, archaeological artifacts, historic and contemporary works of art, including paintings, drawings and sculpture, and archival documents such as photographs, government records, and maps. Staff is assisted by volunteers who perform inventory and cataloguing tasks.

Most of the artifacts in the collections were donated by Peel residents. These collections are used for exhibitions, programs and research by staff, volunteers and visitors. Each potential donation to the Complex is approved by a committee of experts drawn from various heritage backgrounds.

=== Exhibitions ===
In the Art Gallery of Peel approximately eight exhibitions are featured annually, showcasing artists of Regional, provincial and national stature. Each spring, the Gallery's Annual Juried Show, the longest running adjudicated exhibition in the area, attracts artists from throughout Peel and Southern Ontario.

=== Affiliations ===
The Museum is affiliated with: CMA, CHIN, and Virtual Museum of Canada.
