= Jeffrey Spalding =

Canadian artist (1951–2019)

Jeffrey Spalding CM RCA
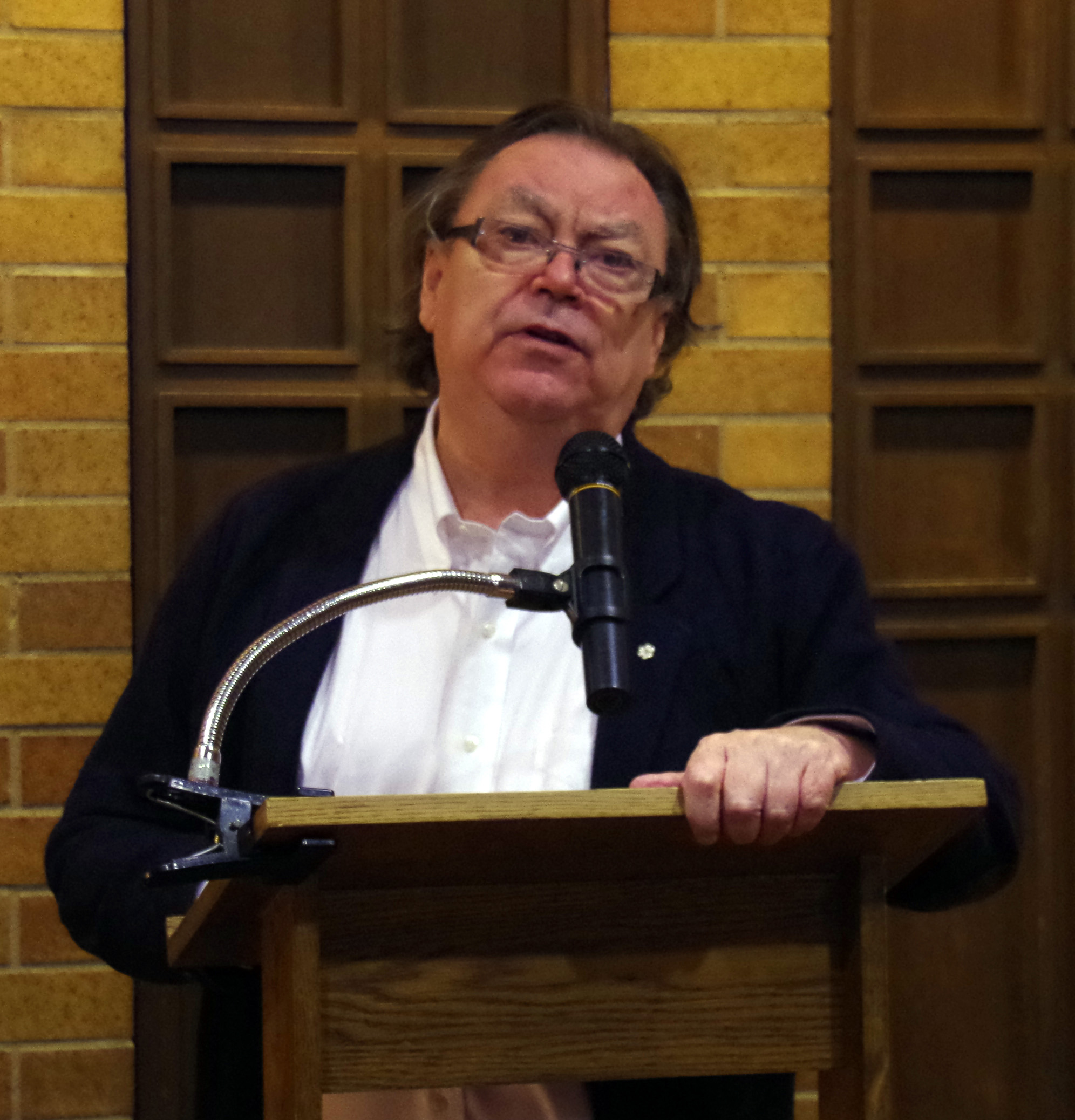
- Jeffrey Spalding speaking at an event in celebration of York Wilson in Toronto in February, 2017.
- Born: Jeffrey John Spalding; November 5, 1951; Edinburgh, Scotland
- Died: October 14, 2019 (aged 67); Canada
- Known for: Painting, curatiion, writing

Jeffrey John Spalding CM RCA (November 5, 1951 – October 14, 2019) was a Scottish-born Canadian artist, curator, author, and educator.

== Career ==
Spalding earned his BA in 1973 from the University of Guelph, a master's degree in art education from Ohio State University and an MFA from the NSCAD University. For more than forty years, Spalding taught at various education institutions and was actively involved as a museum professional. Over the course of his career he worked as a curator and director at various visual arts institutions including the University of Lethbridge, the NSCAD University, the Glenbow Museum, and the Art Gallery of Nova Scotia. Between 1999 and 2002, Spalding served as the director of the Appleton Museum of Art in Ocala, Florida. He served as the 30th president of the RCA (Royal Canadian Academy of the Arts) from 2007 to 2009. From 2007 to 2009, Spalding also served as the president and CEO of the Glenbow Museum in Calgary, Alberta. From 2015 to 2017, he was the chief curator of the Beaverbrook Art Gallery in Fredericton, New Brunswick.

In addition to his work as an educator and museum professional, Spalding also led a successful career as a painter and printmaker. His work can be found in major collections in Canada and around the world including the National Gallery of Canada, the Vancouver Art Gallery, the Montreal Museum of Fine Arts, the Art Gallery of Alberta, the McMichael Canadian Art Collection, the Glenbow Museum, the Robert McLaughlin Gallery and the Beaverbrook Art Gallery. His work is also in the collections of the Canadian Embassy in Washington, D.C., as well as the Canadian Consulate in Sydney, Australia. During 2018 and much of 2019, Spalding was living in Tao Hua Tan, China where he frequently took part in artist residencies. During this time he also curated a couple of exhibitions featuring prominent Chinese artists. Jeffrey Spalding was named to the Order of Canada in 2007. He died from a stroke in 2019 at the age of 67.
