= Frank Armington =

Canadian artist (1876–1941)

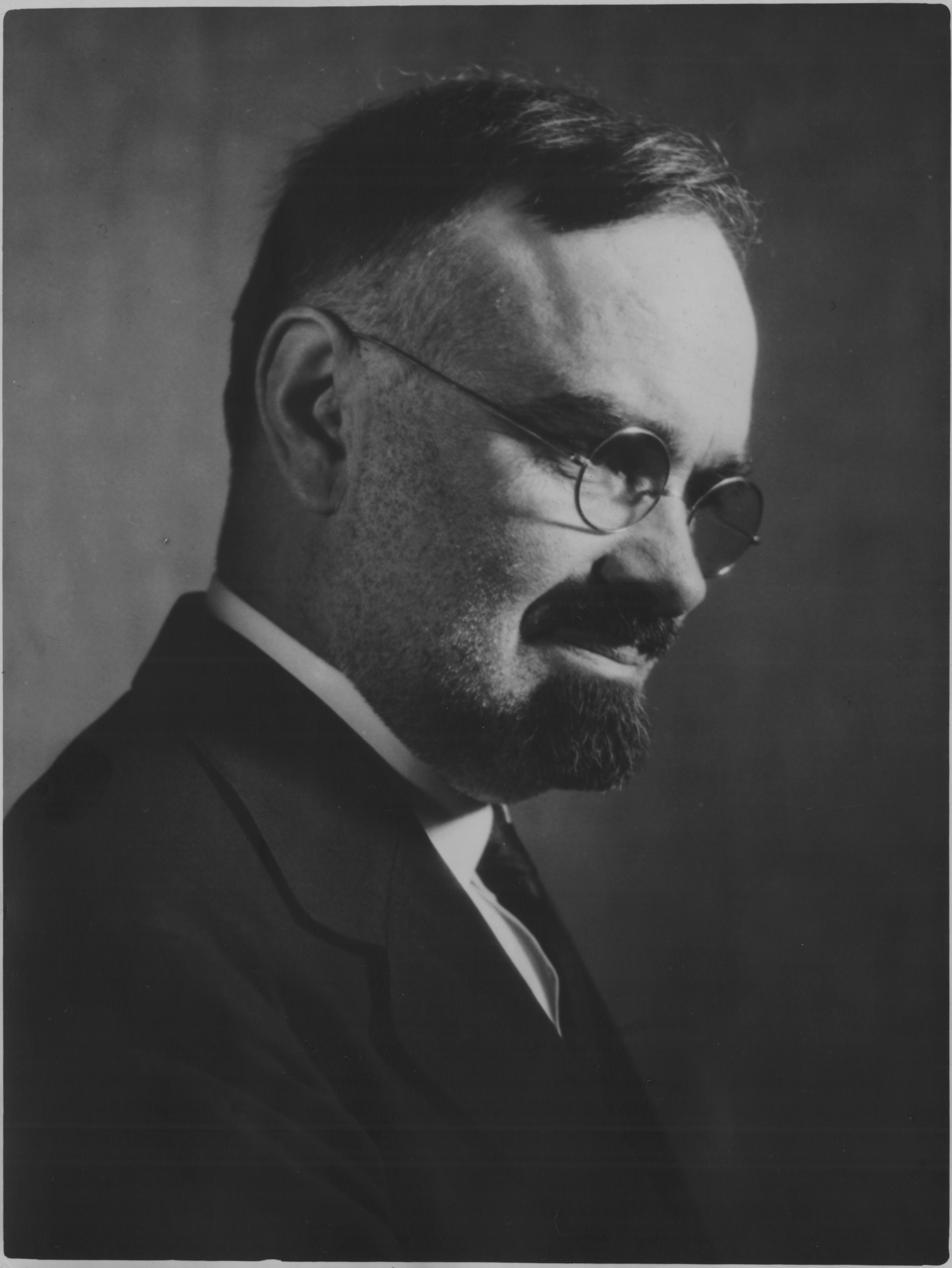
- Armington in 1930
- Born: Frank Milton Armington; July 28, 1876; Fordwich, Ontario
- Died: 1941 (aged 64–65); New York City
- Education: Académie Julian
- Occupation: Graphic artist
- Spouse: Caroline Wilkinson

Frank Milton Armington (July 28, 1876 – 1941) was a Canadian-born and raised artist who lived most of his adult life in France.

== Biography ==
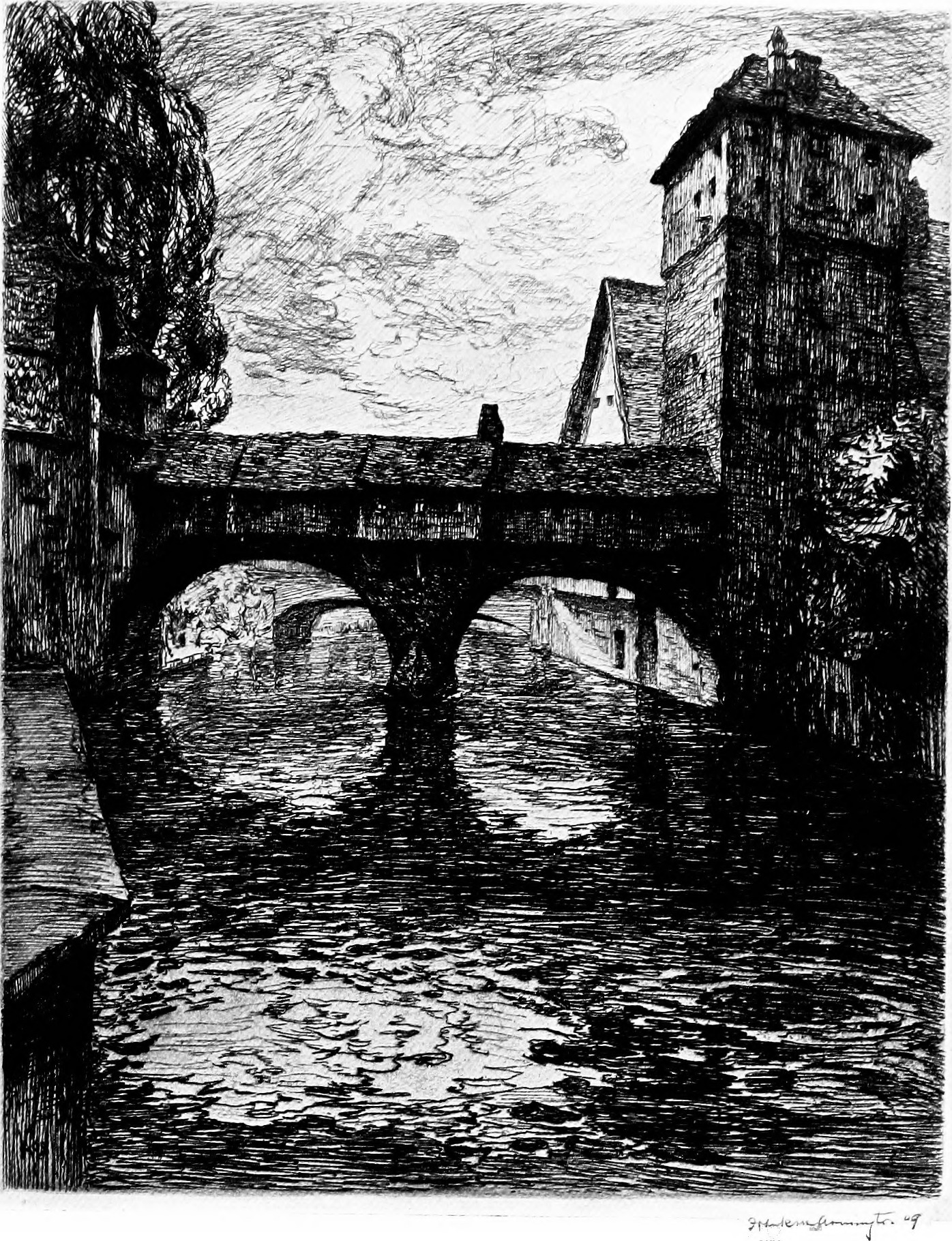
Henkersteg, Nürnberg, 1913 litograph

Frank Armington was born in Fordwich, Ontario, on July 28, 1876. Armington studied art in Ontario with J. W. L. Forster from 1892 until 1899. He also met his future wife, Caroline Wilkinson, during these studies. In 1899, Armington made his first visit to Paris. While there he married Wilkinson and continued to study art, this time at the Académie Julian. Armington and his wife moved back to Canada in 1900, where Armington became a founding member and vice president of the Manitoba Society of Artists.

Armington returned to Paris and lived there from 1905 until 1939. While living in Paris, Frank and Caroline Armington became close friends with the poet and writer Robert W. Service who invited them to his wedding and to his house in Lancieux, where they painted. Toward the end of his life he and his wife moved to New York City. Caroline died soon after the move, however, and Armington remarried in 1940.

Armington died in New York City in 1941. Throughout his career, Armington worked in a number of mediums including etching 221 prints and a number of lithographs. A major list of public collections is given in "Caroline and Frank Armington" (1990)

== Bibliography ==
- Braide, Janet; Parke-Taylor, Nancy (1990). Caroline and Frank Armington, Canadian Painter-Etchers in Paris. Peel, Ontario: Art Gallery of Peel. ISBN 9780969427407. OCLC 463744760 – via Internet Archive. In the book is a listing of 55 etchings (out of 221 printed by the artist) and 14 lithographs drawn from the Peel Art Gallery Museum + Archives collection. It is the standard monograph and catalogue, with thorough descriptions of hundreds of prints. Note - this is not a complete catalogue as it only lists the prints in the collection of the Peel Art Gallery at the time of publication.
- Simpson, Stuart (2006). Frank and Caroline Armington: Through Canadian Eyes: A View of the World c.1911-1931. Lunenburg: North Shore Canadian Art. OCLC 84695328. OCLC 225608233
- Brockman, A. McKenzie (1985). Caroline and Frank Armington. Montreal Print Collectors Society. OCLC 70313843. OCLC 61655577 OCLC 32541696
