= Limehouse Conservation Area =

Protected area in Ontario, Canada

- IUCN category IV (habitat/species management area)
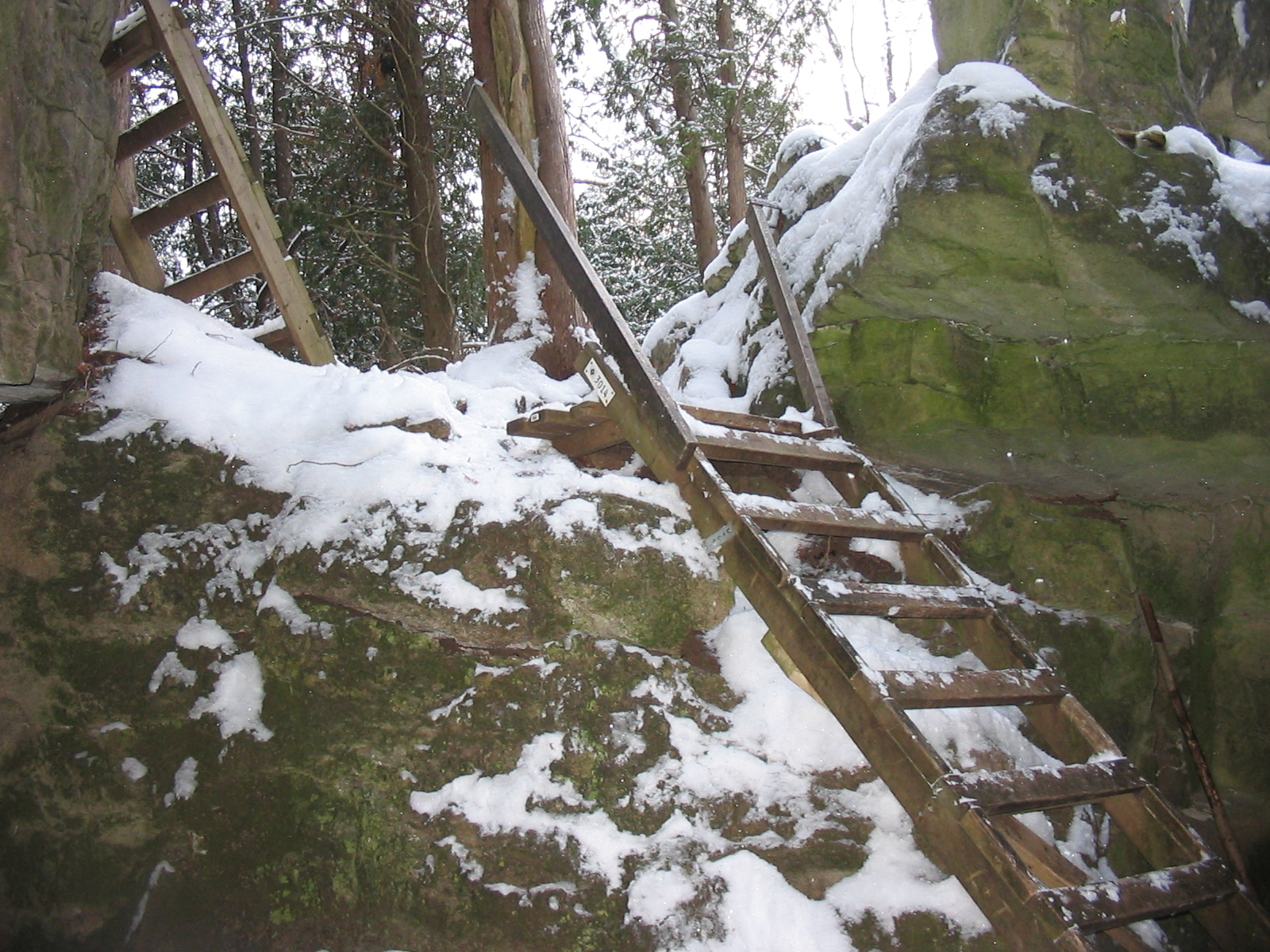
- The Hole in the Wall.

- Location within Ontario
- Location: Ontario, Canada
- Nearest city: Limehouse
- Coordinates: 43°38′05″N 79°58′14″W
- Area: 190 acres (77 ha)
- Governing body: Credit Valley Conservation
- Website: www.creditvalleyca.ca/enjoy-the-outdoors/conservation-areas/limehouse-conservation-area/

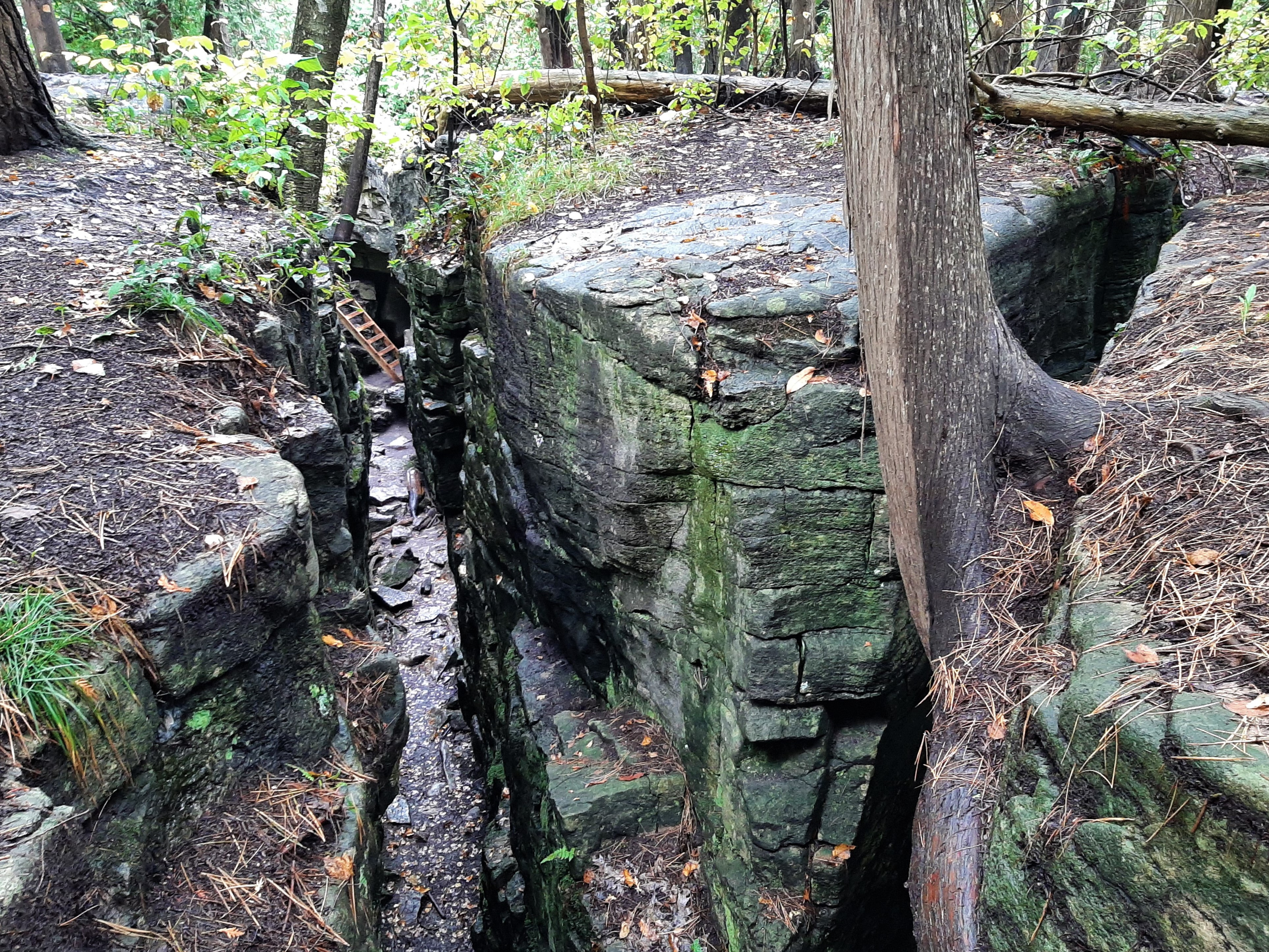
The Hole in the Wall

Limehouse Conservation Area is located on the Niagara Escarpment near Limehouse, Ontario and is owned and operated by Credit Valley Conservation. It is within the watershed of the Credit River, being bisected by its tributary, the Black Creek. Redside dace, a provincially threatened species of fish, is found there. The area is known for a system of deep rock fissures and crevices, some of which are accessible from a trail via ladders at the location known as the "Hole in the Wall". Remains of the 19th century lime kilns (first opened in 1840 and ceased operations in 1917) can be found in the area, making it a site of the regional cultural heritage.
