= Rattray Marsh Conservation Area =

Wetland conservation area along Lake Ontario, Canada

Coordinates: 43°31′03″N 79°36′29″W

Rattray Marsh Conservation area
- IUCN category IV (habitat/species management area)
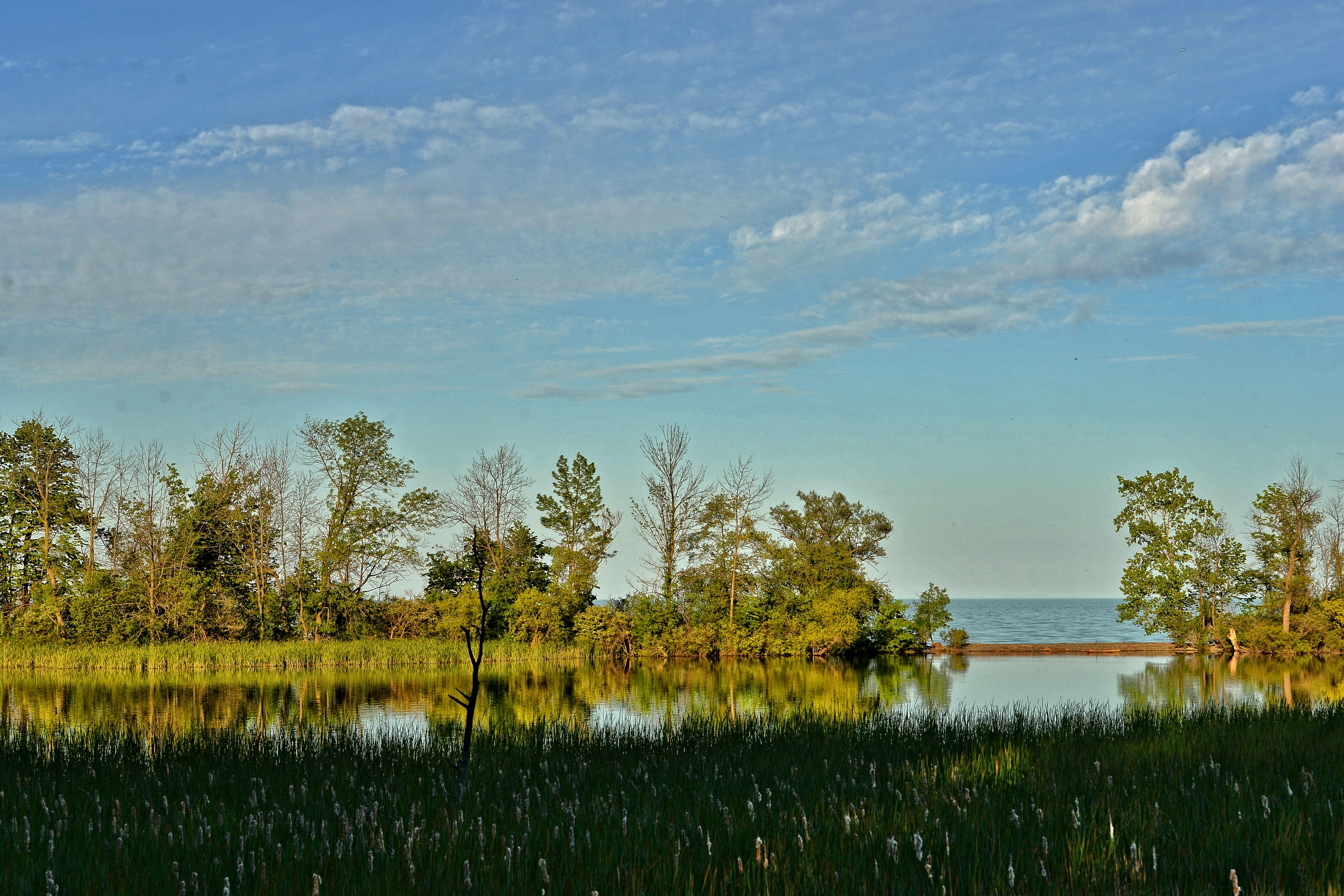
- A portion of marsh near the edge of Lake Ontario
- Interactive map of Rattray Marsh Conservation area
- Location: Mississauga, Ontario, Canada
- Area: 94 acres (38 ha)
- Established: 1975
- Governing body: Credit Valley Conservation

Rattray Marsh Conservation Area encompasses 94 acres of environmentally sensitive wetland situated along the shore of Lake Ontario in Canada. It is located to the south of Jack Darling Memorial Park in the city of Mississauga, Ontario, Canada, within the Regional Municipality of Peel. It is the last remaining lakefront marsh on the western end of Lake Ontario and is owned and managed by Credit Valley Conservation.

It has been designated an Area of Natural and Scientific Interest, an Environmentally Significant Area, and a Provincially Significant Wetland since it was recognized internationally in an Important Biological Program in 1969. The marsh provides a protected environment for many species of plants, birds, mammals, reptiles, and fish. It is a stopover for many migrating waterfowl. The diversity of the marsh also attracts many migrating songbirds. It features a shingle beach and a pedestrian boardwalk overlooking the natural wetland.

The marsh is named after Major James Rattray, whose estate was on the property. Upon his death in 1959, the future of the 148-acre property was debated between conservationists and developers. After 16 years of citizen activism for its preservation and support from various conservation groups and individuals, the marsh was officially opened as a conservation area in 1975.

== History ==
=== Settlement ===
The area was inhabited by the Mississauga people of the Wendake-Niowentsïo territory before the settlers arrived. A treaty was signed between the Mississauga people and new settlers in 1805 for land from Etobicoke creek to Burlington Bay and other areas reaching up to the north of Dundas street. In 1806, the land settlements started on various lots on the land. In 1851, the land including the marsh was sold to Thomas Slade. After his death, the property was in the hands of the National Trust for sale. In 1861, Harris H. Fudger purchased some of the land upon which he built his mansion overlooking the marsh and the property was named Barrymede Farm. The farm produced strawberries, raspberries, apples, pears, cherries, asparagus, and other vegetables. After the death of Fudger, the National Trust sold the property to James Rattray in 1945. Rattray permitted local residents to swim on his beach, walk along the edge of the lake, and also invited his bird-watcher friends to pursue their hobby. When Rattray died in 1969, a long struggle for the preservation of the Marsh began. Frank Burton, the caretaker of Rattray estate, said that his late employer Rattray had wanted the estate to be preserved intact.

=== Conservation ===
After Rattray's death in 1969, developers wanted to build luxury homes and a yacht basin on the property. The conservationists who saw the marsh as an environmental asset protested against it. Two representatives from the Department of Lands and Forests surveyed the area and reported that the plant diversity in the area was greater than in any provincial parks at the time. A committee led by Ruth Hussey wrote a letter to the Premier asking to encourage the Parks Integration Board to support the preservation of the Rattray Estate. However, the Park Integration Board informed the committee that the price could not be supported by the board for its acquisition and that it should come under the municipal corporation who had plans for development of several parks where people could camp. Camping on Rattray estate was thought highly undesirable by conservationists because of the unique characteristics of the area and its role in providing a habitat for many species.

After all the conversation efforts failed, Mr. Brockington, sole executor and trustee of Rattray estate released the land for sale. Mr. Neiman purchased the entire estate in 1963. The conservation efforts continued after the sale and many groups like the South Peel Naturalist Club (SPNC) and Credit Valley Conservation Authority (CVCA) got involved in this local issue.

Late in the year 1963, at the hearing between pro-conservation group and the supporters of private development, it was evident that CVCA would not be able to acquire the land due to not having enough funds. Neiman’s plan suggested that for the completion of the project, the marsh was to be dredged and the walls banked to create a marina. Later at the Ratepayers association meeting, a great local opposition to this plan was seen. The development was temporarily halted because there were higher number of votes against the plan.

Between 1962 and 1964, CVCA conducted studies with the University of Toronto to assess the ecological value of the marsh. The study concluded that for the marsh to remain in good health there would need to be an adequate buffer zone of the higher lands and that acquiring the marsh portion alone would not be enough. During this time, private citizens formed a group called the Rattray Estate Preservation Committee for the purposes of purchasing the entire Rattray estate (including the buffer zone) so it would remain in its natural state as much as possible. They sought the help of Nature Conservancy of Canada, a country-wide organization recently founded at the time, to raise the funds. Many individuals and organizations contributed to the cause and by May 1964 there were enough funds collected to buy a portion of the estate.

In 1965, the committee asked the Toronto Township council to purchase a portion of the estate as well so that the entire area could be protected, which the council refused. Following this the Rattray Estate Preservation Committee dissolved and the Nature Conservancy of Canada gave their donors the option to either have their money returned or used for other conservation projects.

In 1967, Neiman proceeded his development plans after the Toronto Township Council approved phase I of his plan in the Watersedge, Green Glade and Rattray Park Drive area. While the bulldozers were clearing the trees and flora for construction, an article was published by Bruce West in The Globe and Mail praising the conservation efforts for the marsh. This prompted Ruth Hussey to write a letter to the editor about the country's lack of interest in conservation. Following the popularity of that letter, Hussey formed a new citizens' committee and created a petition to be sent to Township to reconsider the purchase of what remained of the Rattray Estate. While several proposals were being made and proposed by the committee the phase I of the development was completed and a portion of the estate cleared of its trees and vegetation. The local residents then asked the Mississauga Council, the newly formed town, to acquire what remained of the Rattray Estate.

In 1971, CVCA was doing studies on the marsh ecology and on the advice of the experts purchased 24.2 acres of marsh, the portion that was proposed for marina. Dennis Veal, the biologist who conducted the study, helped arouse awareness and support from the citizens for the remaining 56.7 acres essential for buffer zone.

In 1972, a planning board meeting was held with representation from provincial government, naturalists, conservation organization, local citizens and Neiman. There was a recommendation made to purchase the rest of the property, but the progress was slow.

In 1973, Lake Ontario rose due to heavy rains, resulting in flooding of low-lying Rattray lands which pointed to the fact that the phase II houses would be under water at flood periods. The flood caused a drop in property price to almost half of its original price. Following the flood, Neiman offered to sell it to the Town of Mississauga but there was no immediate action from the council until Dr. Martin Dobkin was elected as mayor and proposed that the CVCA should acquire the property on behalf of the City of Mississauga. After some negotiation with Neiman, and financial support from citizens, CVCA purchased the property and the Rattray Marsh Conservation Area was officially opened on October 5, 1975.

=== Rattray Marsh Protection Association ===
Rattray Marsh Preservation Committee continued to meet to discuss maintenance, restoration and other matters for continual preservation of the Rattray marsh. In 1979, the committee was formally named as Rattray Marsh Protection Association (RMPA) working in co-operation with the CVCA, City of Mississauga, Region of Peel and other groups, to continue to protect the natural resources of Rattray Marsh.

Members of RMPA addressed concerns posed by any new development in the Marsh. They played an important role in proposing an alternate plan for installing sewers so that they were not installed in the conservation area. They also addressed the environmental impact of proposed land use surrounding the marsh such as bicycle paths and other developments in Jack Darling Memorial park next-door, both of which could have disturbed the tranquility of the marsh. The group also organizes nature walks, annual clean up days and other maintenance efforts in the marsh. The Association has received a number of awards for its efforts. RMPA joined the Credit Valley Conservation in 2009 as a volunteer fundraising committee.

=== Ruth Hussey ===
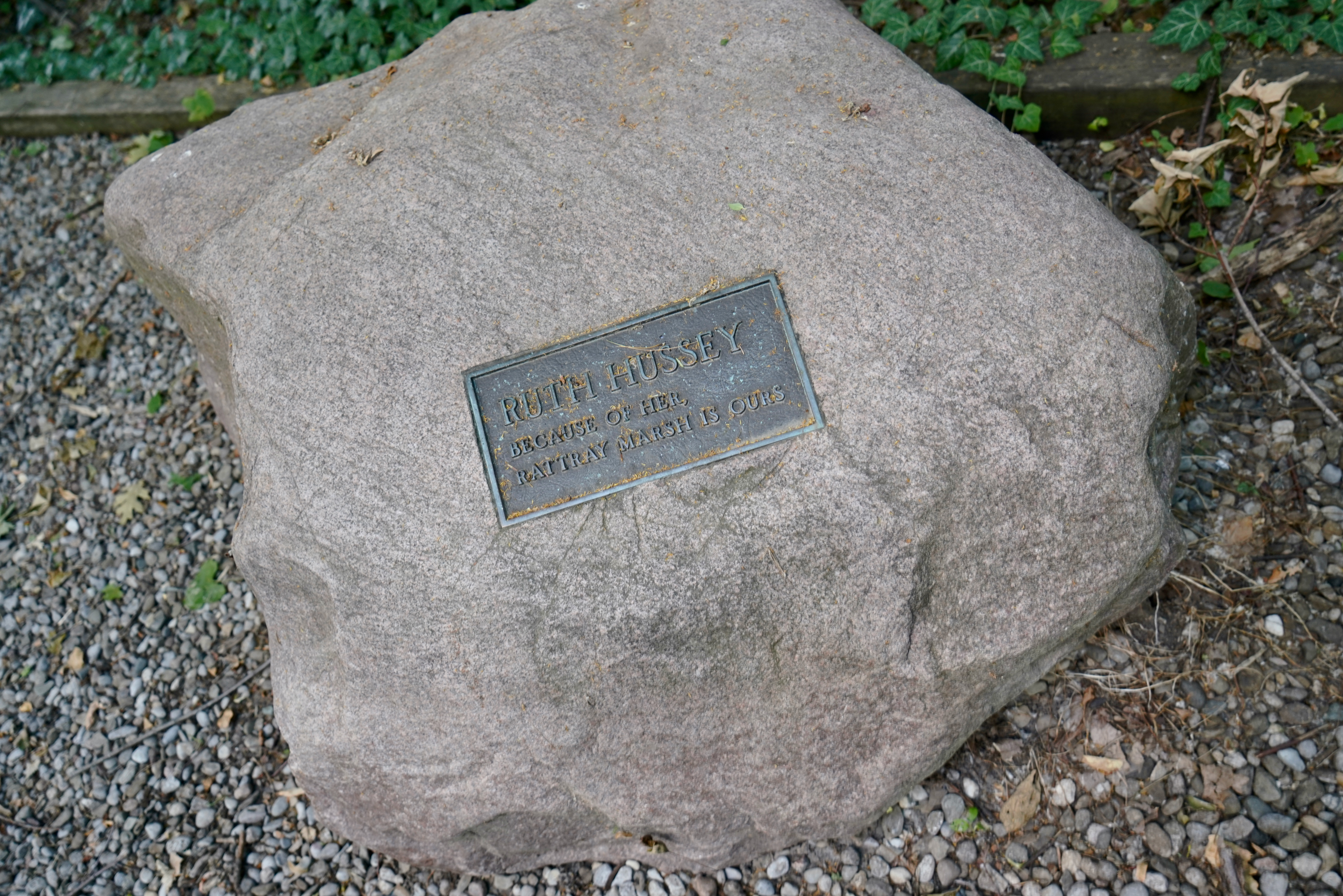
Ruth Hussey tribute stone

Ruth Hussey (1915-1984) was an environmentalist, veterinarian, president of South Peel Naturalists Club, and a volunteer for the Scouting movement. She played an important role in the preservation of Rattray Marsh and had acquired an immense knowledge of marsh and its life. In 1990, The Rattray Marsh Protection Association published Ruth Hussey’s detailed account of the marsh history and its natural history in the book titled “Rattray Marsh Then and Now” co-ordinated by Judith M. Goulin, who finished the book after Ruth Hussey died in 1984.

Among the many awards received by Ruth Hussey was the Carl Nunn Media Conservation Award from the Federation of Ontario Naturalists for her dedication to conservation of Marsh. A large granite boulder at the Old Poplar Row entrance to the Rattray Marsh has been installed by RMPA to pay tribute to Ruth Hussey’s efforts in preserving the Marsh. The stone says “Because of her, Rattray marsh is ours.”

== Urbanization ==
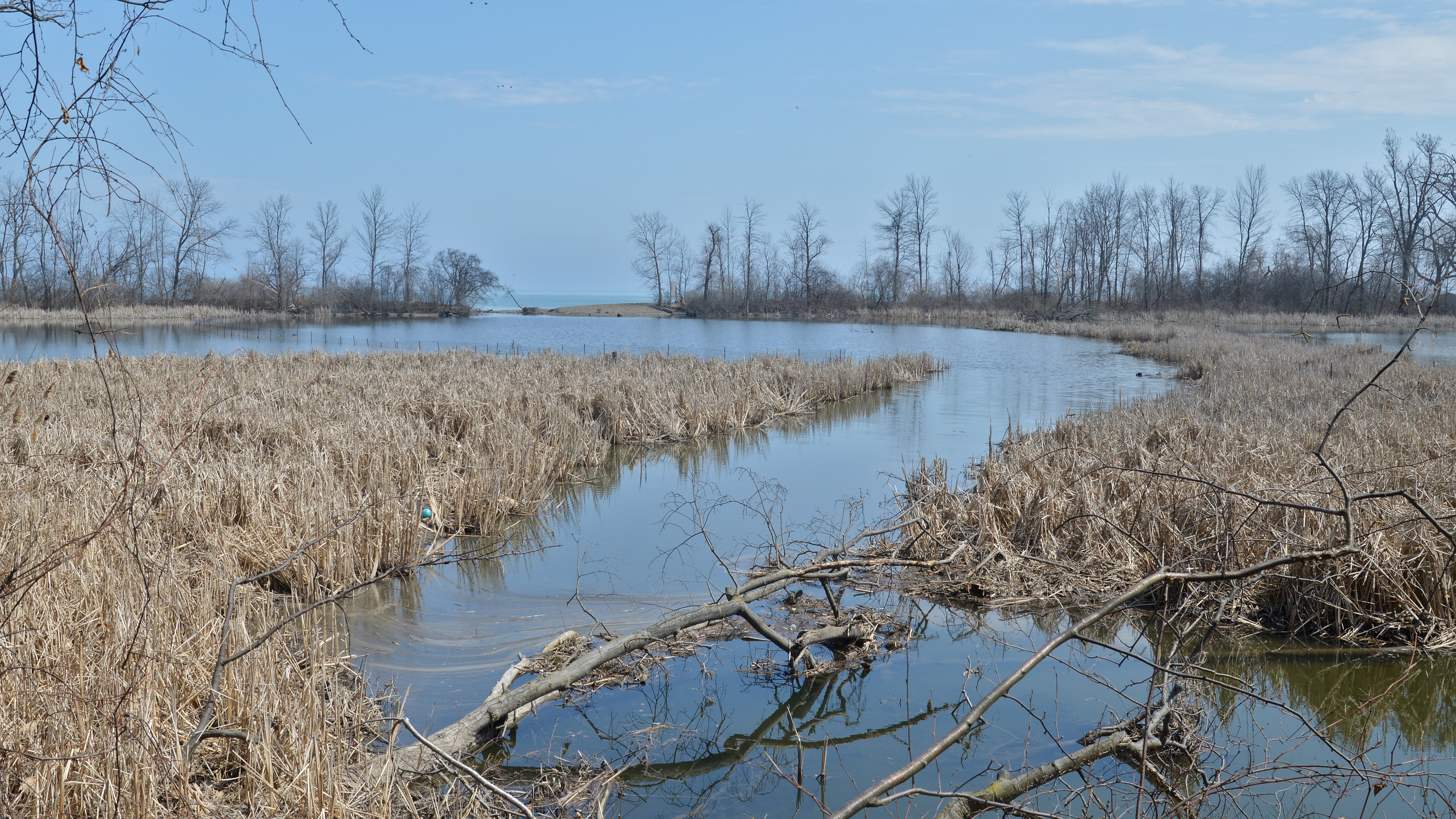
Sheridan Creek at Rattray Marsh

Rattray marsh has ecologically degraded over the years due to urbanization of the surrounding area. The urbanization has resulted in sediment build-up in the Sheridan Creek, a portion of which flows through the marsh. The sediment built up affects the water quality and quantity that results in the increase of invasive plants and species such as Carp in the Rattray Marsh. The urban development around the marsh and paved surfaces has also resulted in faster run off of rain water which carries more soil and nutrients as it goes in to the marsh. Excess nutrients degrade the health of marsh and reduce the diversity of wetland vegetation.

In the beginning of 2013, CVC started a phased removal of excess sediment from marsh which resulted in more observation of species at risk like Least Bittern. There are initiatives such as Low Impact Development and Greening Corporate Grounds that are pursued to help reduce sediment from surrounding areas and restore the marsh ecosystem.

== Plants ==
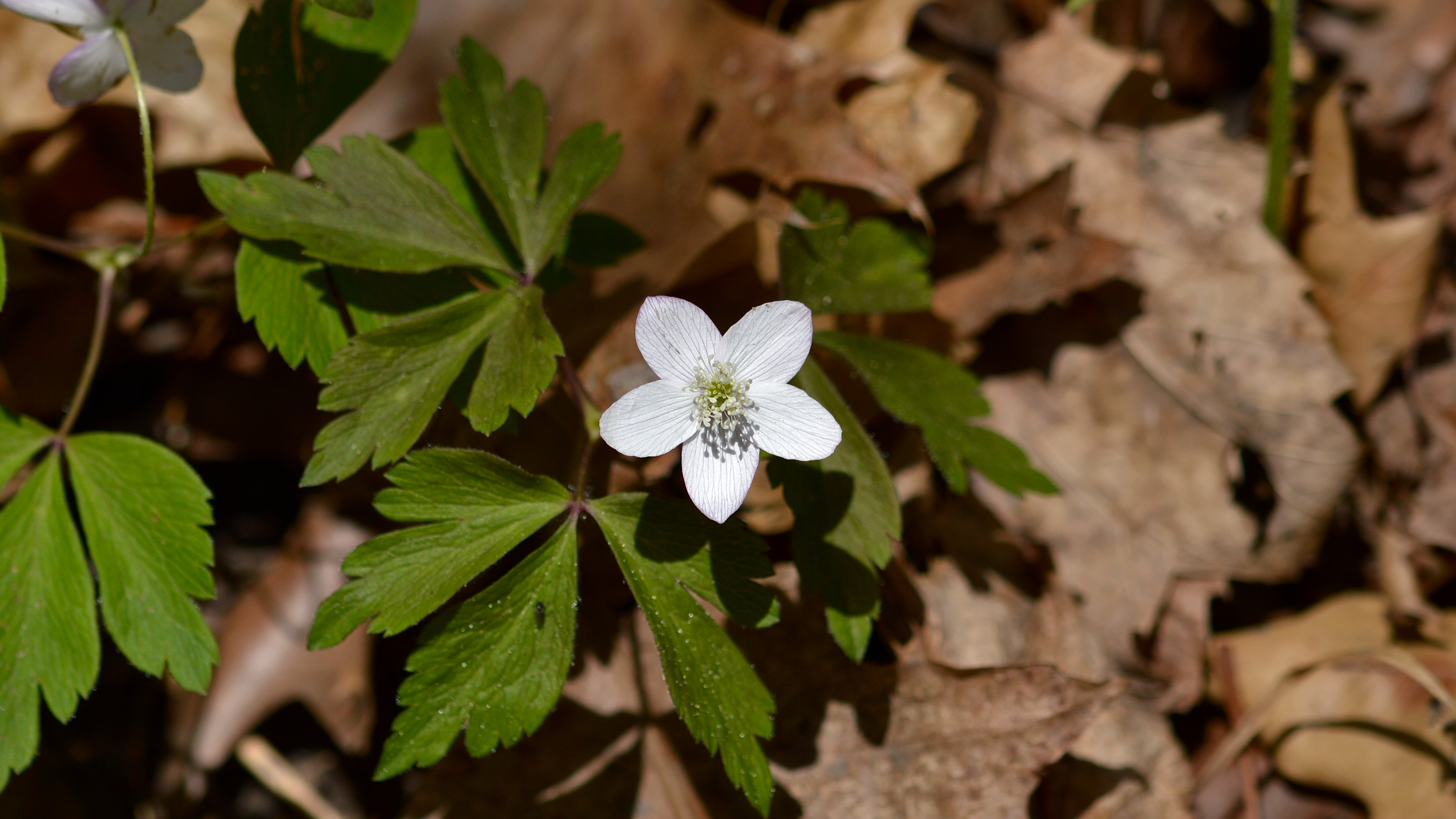
Wood Anemone (Anemone quinquefolia) at Rattray Marsh

Several of the biogeographic influences such as the marsh’s proximity to the limits of Carolinian Zone, its proximity to the Lake Ontario, its southerly temperate nature, and its cool acidic northerly nature all determine the native flora of Rattray marsh. This diversity of climate and conditions creates an environment for a variety of significant plant species. There are 428 species of plants recorded at Rattray Marsh according to Credit Valley Conservation. Among the plants found in Rattray Marsh there are trees such as Yellow Birch, Red Oaks, White Pine, as well as plants such as Horsetail, Cattails, wild Grapevine, Jewelweed, Goldenrod, Staghorn Sumac, Queen Anne’s lace and many wildflowers such as Asters and Trillium, Ontario’s provincial flower.

=== Emerald Ash Borer invasion ===
In 2008, the Emerald Ash Borer, an invasive insect that is known to kill Ash trees native to North America was identified in the city of Mississauga. This invasion of Ash Borer destroyed many species of Ash trees in the area including those at Rattray Marsh. Some of the dead ash trees impacted by emerald ash borer were cut down for the safety of wildlife, visitors and staff. Downed logs are placed in various locations to provide habitat for wildlife.

A number of native trees and shrubs were planted in place by Credit Valley Conservation. The remaining ash trees were injected with an environmentally safe bio-insecticide treatment to prevent them from getting infected with emerald ash borer.

== Birds ==
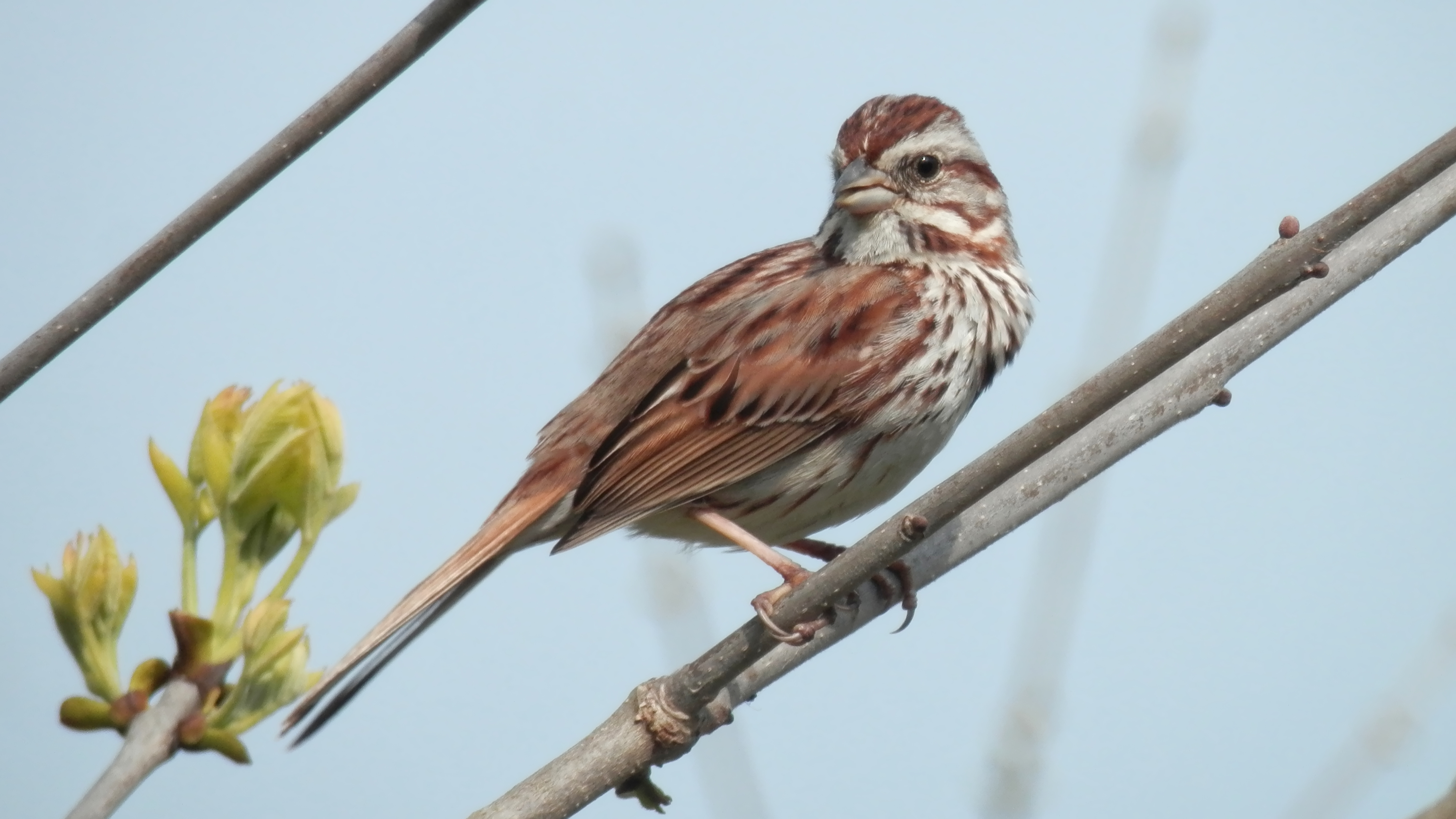
Song sparrow, common resident of Rattray marsh

The variety of plants and natural food sources found in Rattray Marsh provides an important habitat for many species of birds. The marsh is also a stopping point for many of the migratory bird species in spring and fall including various species of songbirds, waterfowl, birds of prey and shorebirds. According to Credit Valley Conservation, there are 227 species of birds found in the Rattray Marsh. Following the Emerald Ash Borer infection and destruction of trees, several native plants have been planted in the Marsh to provide food sources for birds while removing invasive species like Buckthorn. Nests of uncommon species like Great Horned Owl and Eastern Screech Owl have also been spotted in the marsh in 2021 and 2022 respectively. Due to wide variety of birds found in Rattray marsh, it is often frequented by bird watchers and bird photographers.

According to the Rattray Marsh Environmental Study report from August 2009, out of the 218 bird species sighted between 1975 and 2007, 84 hold Priority Conservation Status, 81 are Species of Conservation Concern, 47 are considered Area sensitive for habitat requirements, and 40 are considered Provincially Rare. Bird listing at the time had identified 62 species not recorded since 1984.

== Mammals ==
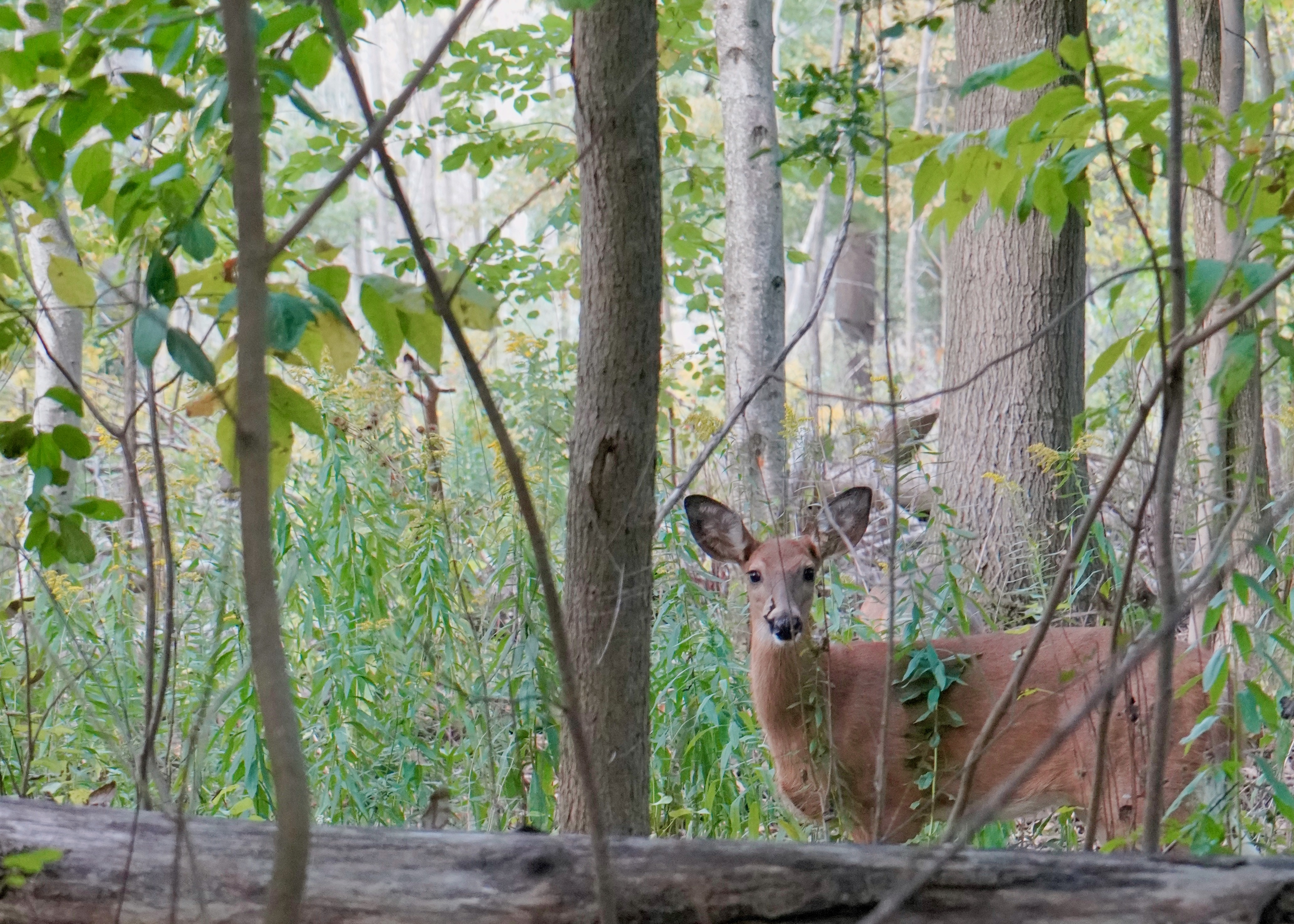
White Tailed deer at Rattray marsh conservation area

There are 26 species of mammals found in the Rattray marsh including White Tailed Deer, Red Fox, Muskrat, Beaver, Striped Skunk, Coyote, Mink and other species (many of which are nocturnal by nature.) Temporary fences were installed in some areas in 2022 to prevent deer from grazing on new trees and shrubs planted to restore the conservation area.

== Fish ==
Many fish use the wetland for breeding, feeding and shelter and move into the marsh from Lake Ontario during spawning season. There are 11 species of fish found in the Rattray marsh. In April and May, White Suckers are found swimming upstream to spawn. The fish migration times in the marsh are often dependent on the operation of the shingle bar affected by the variation in water level. During lower water levels, the shingle bar cuts off the flow between Lake Ontario and the marsh. While White Suckers are native to marsh, invasive species like Carp are most often seen splashing near the surface of the water.

== Reptiles and amphibians ==
Rattray marsh is home to 18 species of reptiles and amphibians amongst which are a various species of toads, frogs, turtles, snakes, and salamanders. All species of turtles found in Ontario are currently considered species at risk. The most common turtles found in the marsh are Midland Painted turtles and Snapping turtles, with an occasional sighting of Map turtles and Blanding’s turtle.

== See also ==
- Wetlands of Ontario - list of wetlands in Ontario
