= Brampton Jail =

Building in Ontario, Canada

Peel County Jail (Gaol)
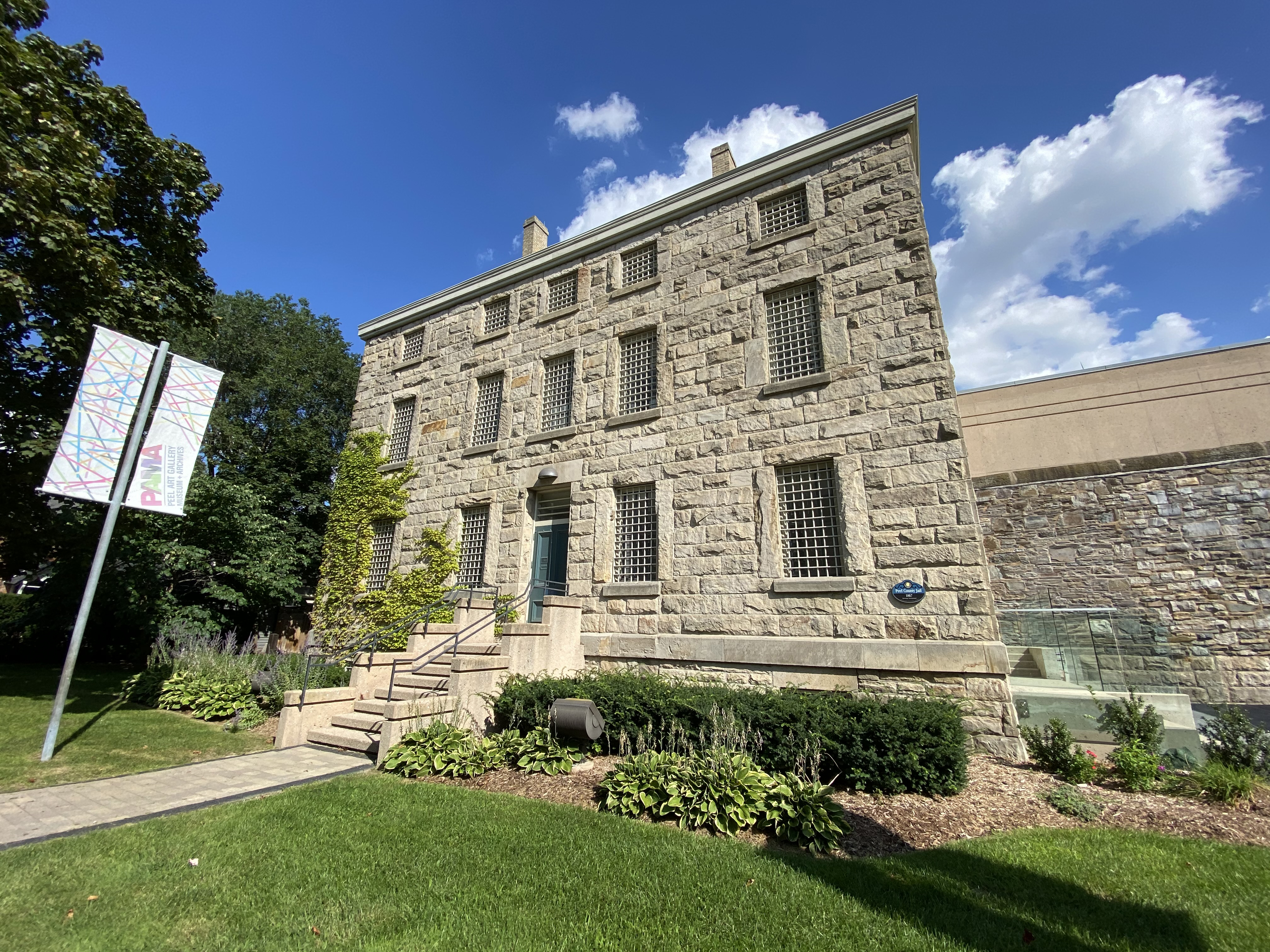
- Interactive map of Peel County Jail (Gaol)
- Location: Brampton, Ontario, Canada; 43.68516°N 79.75712°W
- Status: Closed
- Security class: Maximum
- Capacity: 30
- Opened: 1867
- Closed: 1977
- Managed by: Region of Peel

The Peel County Jail, is located in the city of Brampton, Ontario, Canada at the intersection of Wellington and Main Streets. Built in 1867, and closed in 1977, the building is now a part of the Peel Art Gallery, Museum and Archives, housing part of the museum and all of its storage, as well as the Regional archives reading room and storage.

The jail, although designed to house 30 inmates, often saw over 60 men and women packed into its one metre by two metre cells. Most of the overcrowding was because of a lack of facilities for the care of the poor or destitute. Even the nearest hospital was outside town and in 1882, a sick man was housed at the jail after being arrested as a "vagrant". The man, whose name was not recorded, received no medical care from the jail's staff and died at the jail shortly after he was brought into custody.

The first of three hangings at the jail took place in 1909, when Stefan Swyrda was hanged, for the murder of 17-year-old Olack Leutick, in the presence of about a dozen witnesses. In 1941, Gordon Mathews was hanged for the murder of his wife. The jail's third and final hanging occurred in 1946 when Walter Zabalotny was executed for the murder of Alice Campbell while in the commission of a robbery. Before renovations began on the new Peel Heritage Complex, the grounds were searched for any bodies that may have been interred there. The only body located was believed to be that of Stefan Swyrda. His body now rests in the Meadowvale Cemetery, in Mississauga, Ontario.

The Jail's most notorious inmate was Huey Newton, an American co-founder of the Black Panther Party, who was held there in 1977 while awaiting extradition to the United States for murder. Newton's opinion of the jail was that it was "worse than any jail in Cuba", where he had also been incarcerated.

== See also ==
- List of correctional facilities in Ontario

== Affiliations ==
The Museum is affiliated with: CMA, CHIN, and Virtual Museum of Canada.
