= Caroline Armington =

Canadian-born artist (1875–1939)

Caroline Helena Armington
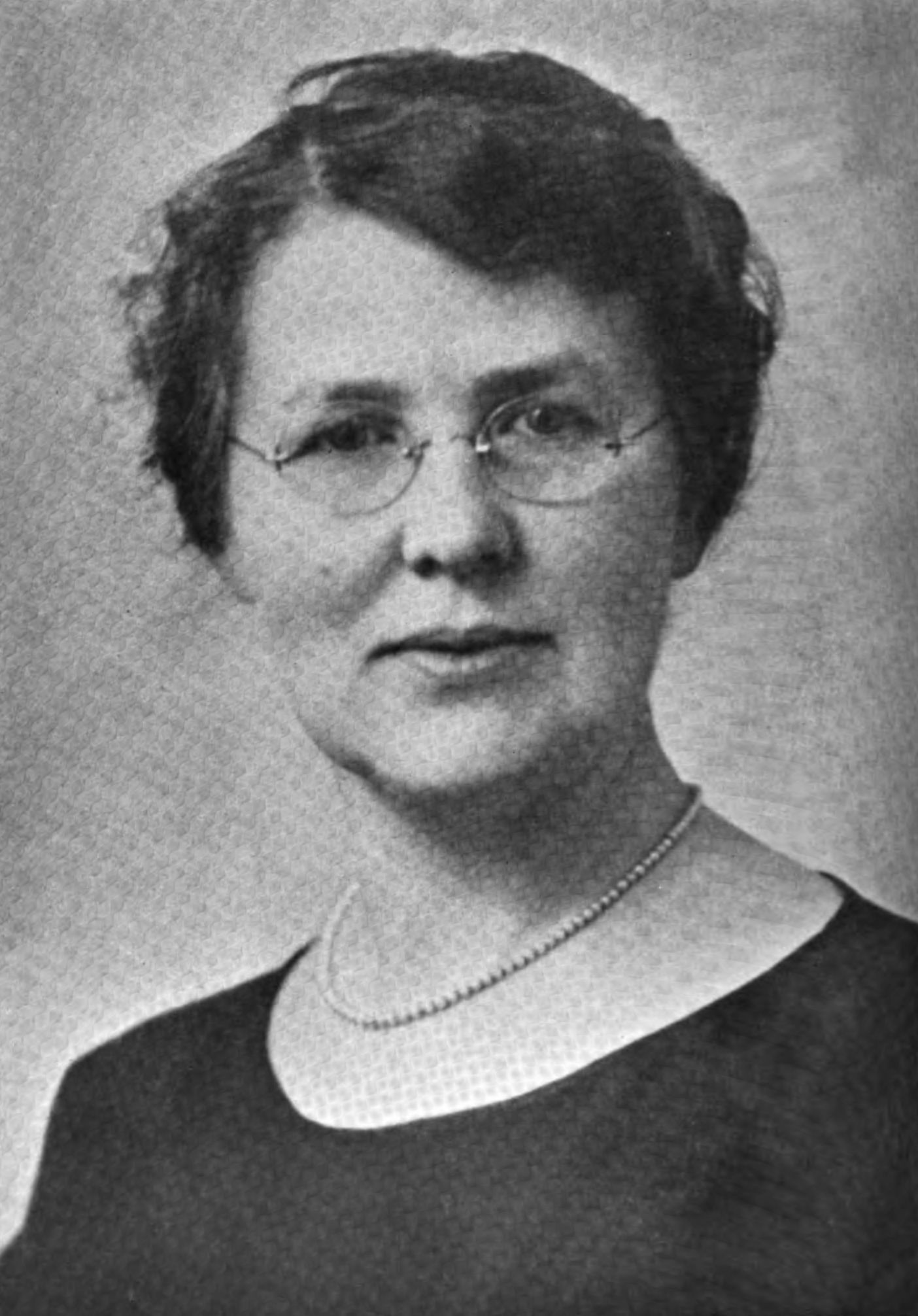
- Born: September 11, 1875; Brampton, Ontario, Canada
- Died: October 25, 1939 (aged 64); New York, New York
- Education: Académie Julian
- Known for: Painting, Printmaking
- Spouse: Frank Armington

Signature
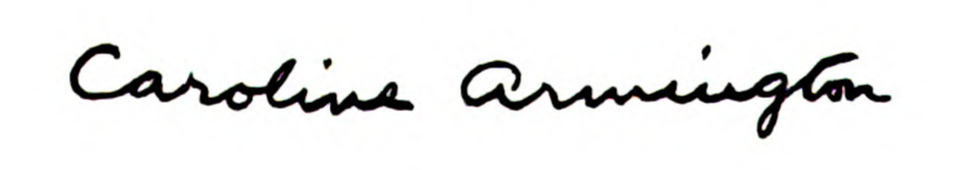

Caroline Helena Armington (1875–1939) was a Canadian born artist. She was "hard-working, determined and ambitious".

Armington worked in a number of mediums including a large body of etchings (551). Her main practice consisted of painting and printmaking. In addition to being an artist, she also trained at Guelph General Hospital as a nurse.

== Biography ==
Caroline Helena Wilkinson was born on September 11, 1875, in Brampton, Ontario, Canada. From 1892 to 1899 she took art studies under J. W. L. Forster. She traveled to New York in 1899, where she worked as a nurse. The following year she sailed to Europe and married Frank Armington. She moved back to Canada during 1900–01.

From 1905 to 1910, the couple returned to study in Paris at the Académie de la Grande Chaumière and Académie Julian. In 1908, Caroline's painting Paysanne Hollandaise was accepted at the Salon des Artistes Francais' annual exhibition, held at the Grand Palais, Paris. They assisted the American Ambulance Hospital in Paris from 1914 to 1918, with Caroline working as a nurse and Frank as an orderly. Armington's etching of Bayeux Cathedral was the May 1924 cover of Brooklyn Life magazine. According to the magazine article, collections of her etchings were in the following museums at the time: Luxembourg and Petit Palais, Paris; British Museum and South Kensington Museum, London; Bibliographic de Belgique, Brussels; Liege; New York Public Library; and National Gallery of Canada, Ottawa, Canada.

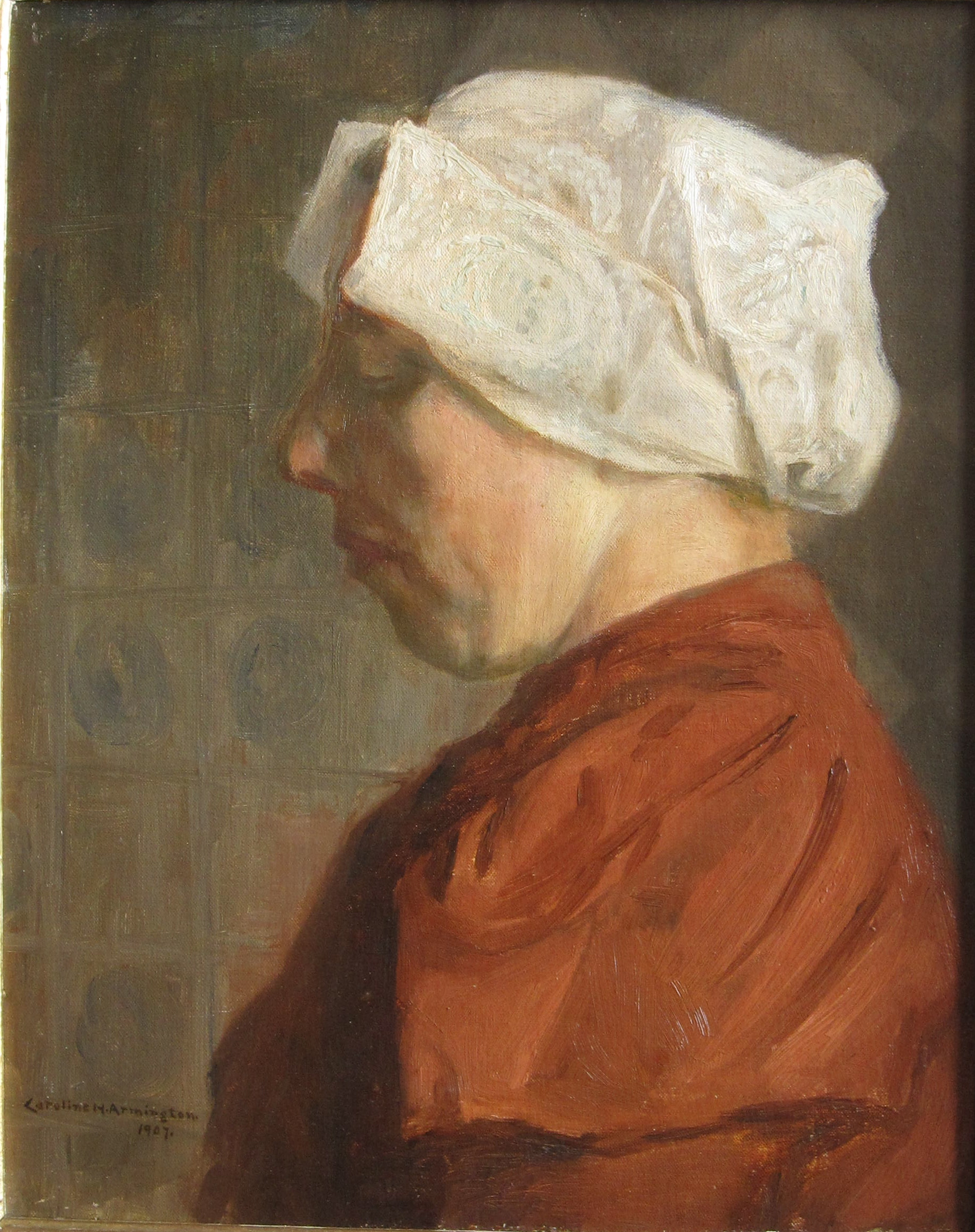
Paysanne Hollandaise (Dutch Peasant), 1907, by Caroline H. Armington (private collection, Toronto, Ontario)

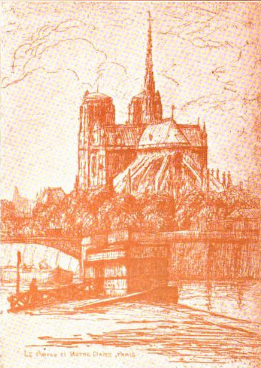
The Bridge and Notre Dame, by Caroline Armington

Armington left Paris in 1939 and moved to New York. She died there on October 25, 1939.

== Public collections ==
A major list is given in "Caroline and Frank Armington" (1990)

- The Metropolitan Museum of Art
- The Peel Art Gallery, Museum and Archives
- The National Gallery of Art, Washington DC
- The Museum of Fine Arts, Houston
- Burnaby Art Gallery, Burnaby, BC
- British Museum, London
- Victoria and Albert Museum, London

== Sources and further reading ==
- Braide, Janet; Parke-Taylor, Nancy (1990). Caroline and Frank Armington, Canadian Painter-Etchers in Paris. Peel, Ontario: Art Gallery of Peel. ISBN 9780969427407. OCLC 463744760 – via Internet Archive. The book includes a listing of 257 etchings (out of 551 printed by the artist) drawn from the Peel Art Gallery Museum + Archives collection. It is the standard monograph and catalogue, with thorough descriptions of hundreds of prints. Note - this is not a complete catalogue as it only lists the prints in the collection of the Peel Art Gallery at the time of publication.
- Baker, Marilyn (2016) [2003]. "WILKINSON, CAROLINE HELENA (Armington)". Dictionary of Canadian Biography. Vol. 16. Toronto: University of Toronto/Université Laval. ISBN 9780802090874. OCLC 946253156. Archived from the original on 18 March 2020.
- Downs, Winfield Scott, ed. (1941). "Armington, Caroline Helena, Artist, Engraver". Encyclopedia of American Biography: New Series. Vol. 12. New York: American Historical Society. pp. 391–392. OCLC 649569887 – via HathiTrust.
- Simpson, Stuart (2006). Frank and Caroline Armington: Through Canadian Eyes: A View of the World c.1911-1931. Lunenburg: North Shore Canadian Art. OCLC 84695328. OCLC 225608233
- Brockman, A. McKenzie (1985). Caroline and Frank Armington. Montreal Print Collectors Society. OCLC 70313843. OCLC 61655577 OCLC 32541696
