= Credit Valley Conservation =

Ontario based conservation authority

- Founded: May 13, 1954
- Type: Conservation authority
- Purpose: Habitat conservation, water conservation, wildlife management
- Headquarters: 1255 Old Derry Road Mississauga, ON L5N 6R4
- Location: Mississauga, Ontario, Canada
- Region served: Credit River Watershed, including parts of Peel Region, Halton Region, Wellington County and Dufferin County
- Interim CAO: Terri LeRoux
- Key people: Michael Palleschi, Chair Alvin Tedjo, Vice Chair CVC Board of Directors: Tom Adams, Town of Oakville; Dipika Damerla, City of Mississauga; Stephen Dasko, City of Mississauga; Michael Dehn, Town of Erin; Christina Early, Town of Caledon; Dennis Keenan, City of Brampton; Ann Lawlor, Town of Halton Hills; Andy MacIntosh, Town of Orangeville; Brad Butt, City of Mississauga; Fred Nix, Township of Mono; Michael Palleschi, City of Brampton Alvin Tedjo, City of Mississauga
- Website: www.cvc.ca

Credit Valley Conservation (CVC) is one of 36 conservation authorities in Ontario, Canada, responsible for protecting, restoring, and managing natural resources at the watershed level. CVC operates within the Credit River watershed and smaller adjacent watersheds that drain directly into Lake Ontario, as well as along a section of the Lake Ontario shoreline. Together, these areas make up CVC's jurisdiction. CVC is a member of Conservation Ontario.

CVC works in partnership with municipal governments, schools, businesses, and community organizations to deliver locally based environmental programs.

CVC receives its funding from municipal sources, as well as grants and donations made to the Credit Valley Conservation Foundation, self-generated user fees, and other service fees. CVC was founded in 1954 when much of the Credit River watershed was used for rural agriculture and pasture. Since then, there has been rapid urban development within the southern portion of the Credit River watershed, within the Cities of Mississauga and Brampton.

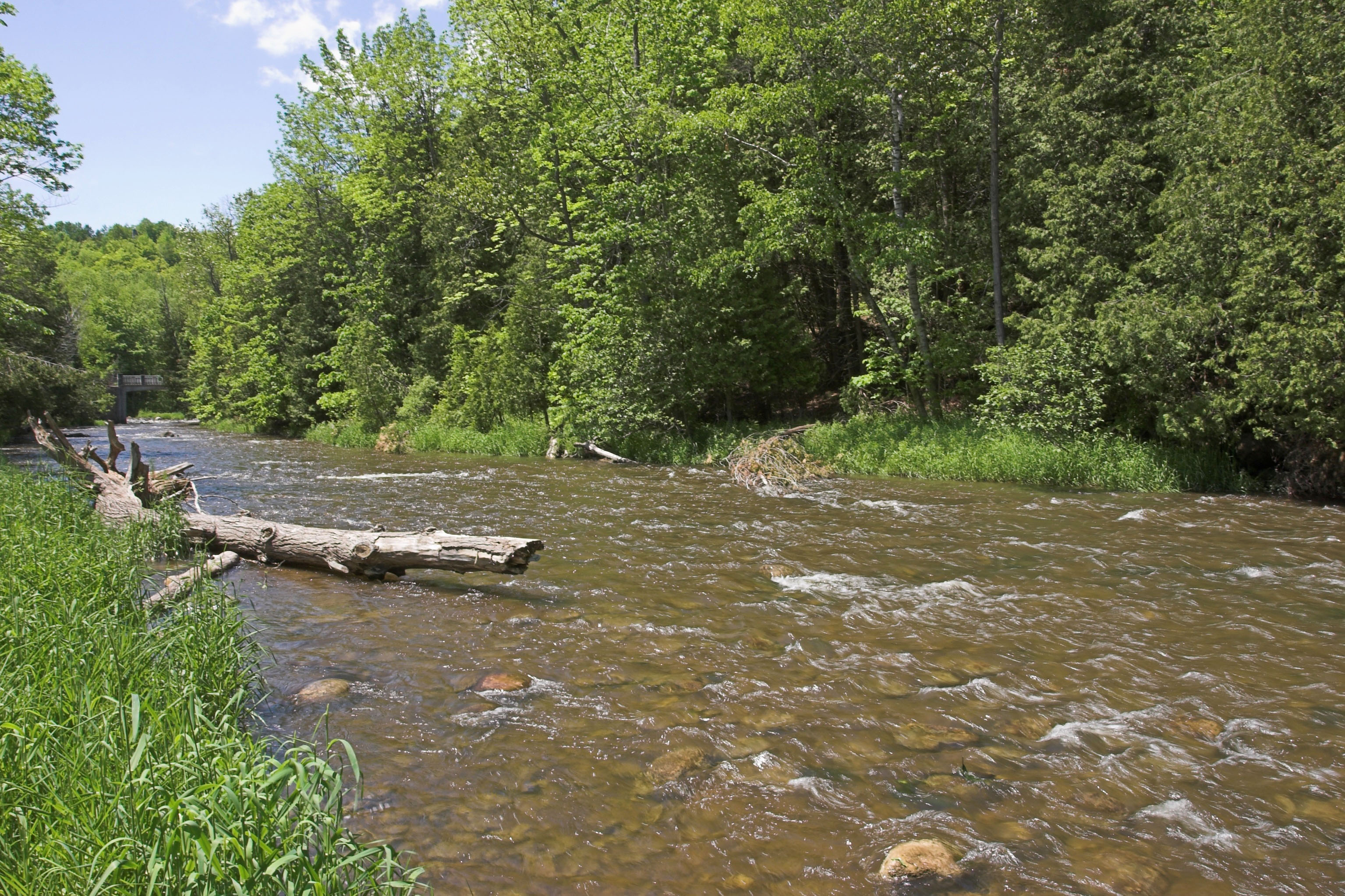
The Credit River near Belfountain

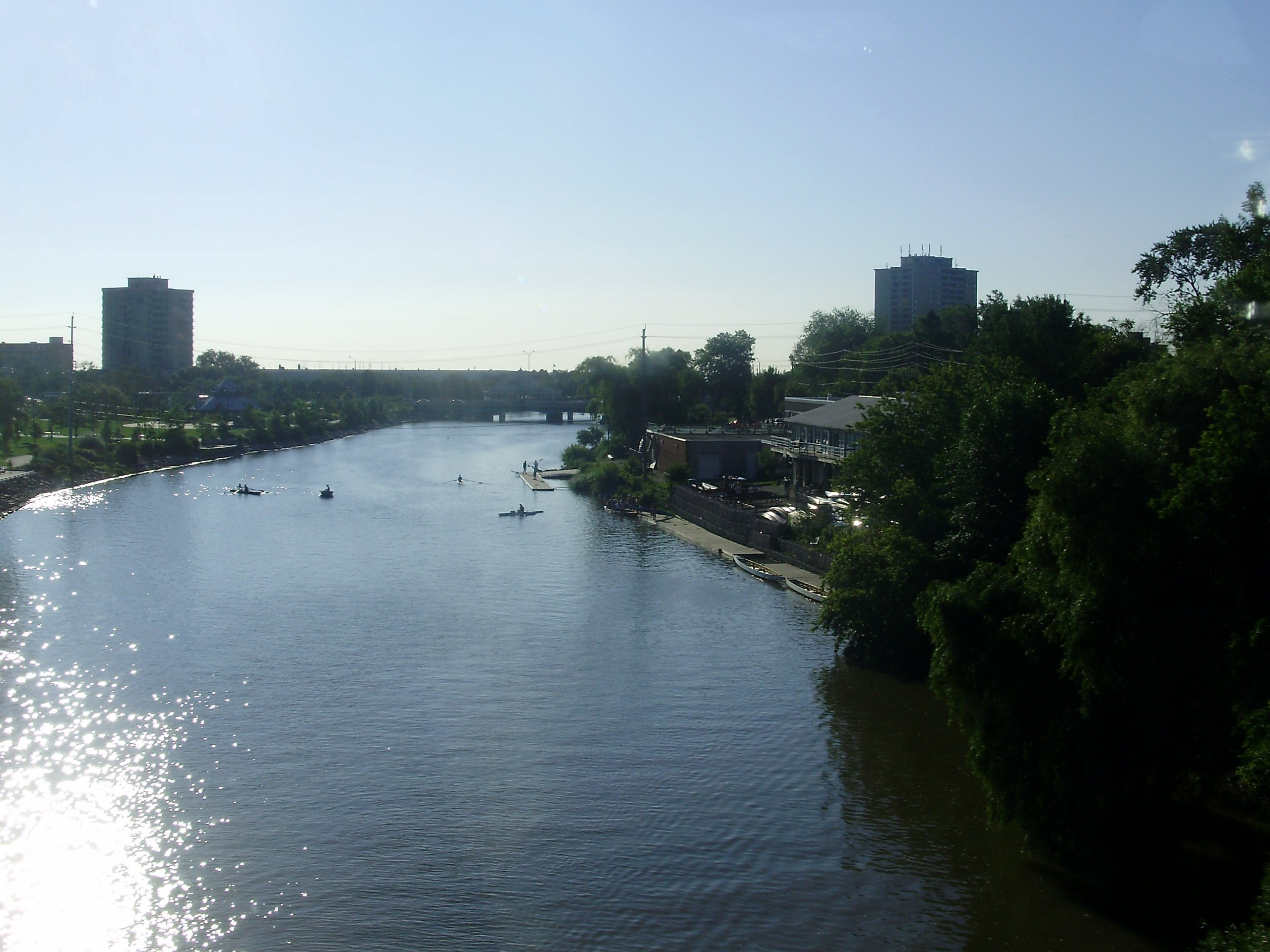
The Credit River in Port Credit, Mississauga

== Conservation Areas ==
Credit Valley Conservation operates 11 conservation areas and other protected territories:

- Belfountain Conservation Area
- Elora Cataract Trailway
- Island Lake Conservation Area
- (New) Jim Tovey Lakeview Conservation Area
- Ken Whillans Resource Management Area
- Limehouse Conservation Area
- Meadowvale Conservation Area
- Rattray Marsh Conservation Area
- Silver Creek Conservation Area
- Terra Cotta Conservation Area
- Upper Credit Conservation Area

== Activities ==
CVC is actively engaged in water management. The average daily flow of the Credit River is 690,000 cubic metres, 65% of which comes from groundwater. An estimated 750,000 residents in the Credit River Watershed, 87% of whom live in the lower third of the watershed, in present-day Mississauga and Brampton. In 1999, 21% of the watershed was developed, and by 2020, 40% of the watershed will be developed (based on approved development and the official plans of the municipalities).

== See also ==
- Conservation Authority
- Mississauga
- Credit River
- Toronto and Region Conservation Authority
