= Mississauga Fire and Emergency Services =

Coordinates: 43.5874°N 79.6275°W

Mississauga Fire & Emergency Services

Operational area
- Country: Canada
- Province: Ontario
- City: Mississauga

Agency overview
- Annual calls: 30,000+
- Staffing: 700+
- Fire chief: Deryn Rizzi
- IAFF: 1212

Facilities and equipment
- Battalions: 3
- Stations: 21
- Engines: 16
- Trucks: 6
- Platforms: 2
- Quints: 1
- Squads: 4
- Rescues: 2
- Tenders: 1
- HAZMAT: 1
- Light and air: 1

Website
- Site

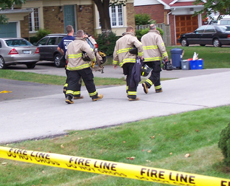
MFES responding to a house explosion (2006)

Mississauga Fire and Emergency Services (MFES) provides fire protection, technical rescue services, hazardous materials response, and emergency medical assistance as a first responder to the city of Mississauga, Ontario, Canada.

The Fire Service was established in 1968 and formed from local departments (Cooksville, Lakeview, Malton, Meadowvale) that existed prior to the creation of Mississauga, Ontario. The Port Credit Fire Department and Streetsville Fire Departments were added upon the amalgamation of those communities with Mississauga in 1974. MFES was mainly made up of the Toronto Township Volunteer Fire Department, itself created from volunteer units in the 1870s. By 1975, Mississauga's fire service was a full-time service.

Mississauga Fire co-ordinates with Toronto Fire Services, Brampton Fire and Emergency Services, and Peel Regional Paramedic Services for additional help and practicing emergency disaster exercises. In 2017, MFES responded to over 34,000 emergency calls.

== Operations ==
=== Fire stations and apparatus ===
Mississauga, Brampton, and Caledon underwent a region-wide renumbering of stations and apparatus in the 1990s. Each station is assigned a 3 digit number and each apparatus is given an alpha-numeric callsign corresponding with the station number. The alphabetic prefix identifies the type of apparatus, the first numerical digit identifies the municipality, and the remaining two numerical digits identify the station. The municipality identifiers are '1' for Mississauga, '2' for Brampton, and '3' for Caledon.

For example, Station 101 would be Mississauga's no. 1 station and P101 would be a pumper assigned to it, and so on. Spare apparatus (for Mississauga and Brampton) would be numbered with a 5 as the second numerical digit in the number (P150, S151, A152, etc.). In January 2020, as part of an apparatus redeployment plan, a second Pumper Company was organized and assigned to Station 101. Since the department had not previously run two Pumper Companies out of the same station, a numbering system for duplicate companies had not been utilized. To distinguish the second pumper from P101, it was given the callsign P131.

In December 2023, MFES took delivery of two heavy rescue vehicles to replace two frontline squad vehicles.

In December 2024, MFES took delivery of its first electric pumper apparatus.

As of June 2026, MFES currently operates 23 active fire stations and the following apparatus:

Station #	Neighbourhood	Pumper Company	Squad Company or Rescue Company	Aerial Company	Car (Chief) units	Special or Support Units	Address	Build year(s) or Opening date
101	Cooksville	Pumper 101		Aerial 101	Car 106 (Platoon Chief); Car 108 (District Chief)		15 Fairview Road West	1974
102	Lakeview	Pumper 102					710 3rd Street	1978-79
103	Clarkson			Aerial 103			2035 Lushes Avenue	1984-85
104	Port Credit	Pumper 104					62 Port Street West	1955
105	Malton		Squad 105	Aerial 105			7101 Goreway Drive	1981
106	Applewood	Pumper 106		Aerial 106			1355 Winding Trail	2011-13
107	Erindale	Pumper 103 (temporary)					1965 Dundas Street West	1968-70
108	Streetsville	Pumper 108					2267 Britannia Road West	1979-80
109	Britannia	Pumper 109 (quint)					1735 Britannia Road East	1977
110	Cooksville		Squad 110	Aerial 110			2316 Hurontario Street	1981-82
111	Meadowvale		Squad 111	Aerial 111			2740 Derry Road West	1982-83
112	Erindale Station	Pumper 112				Tanker 101 (temporary)	4090 Creditview Road	1984
114	Heartland			Aerial 114		Haz-Mat 101; Special Operations 101	5845 Falbourne Street	1990
115	Central Erin Mills	Pumper 115		Aerial 115		Car 160 (Mechanical Division)	4595 Glen Erin Drive	1991
116	West Airport	Pumper 116				Air Rehab 101	6825 Tomken Road	2011-12
117	North Dixie	Pumper 117			Car 109 (District Chief)	Command Post 101	1090 Nuvik Court	1999
118	East Credit	Pumper 118			Car 107 (District Chief)		1045 Bristol Road West	1996
119	Toronto Pearson (Airport)	Pumper 119					6375 Airport Road	2014-15
120	Uptown	Pumper 120	Squad 120				125 Eglinton Avenue West	2018-19
121	Meadowvale Village	Pumper 121	Rescue 121				6745 Mavis Road	2001-02
122	Churchill Meadows	Pumper 122				Rehab 101; Antique unit	3600 Thomas Street	2002-03
123		Pumper 123	Rescue 123				3050 The Collegeway	May 23, 2026
124							2524 Cawthra Road	Under construction
125	Union Park	Pumper 125					6627 Tenth Line West	November 30, 2024
127	Lorne Park						870 Queen Street West	In planning
Garry W. Morden Centre (Headquarters/ Training Facility)	Lisgar	Pumper 180 (Training)			Car 101 (Fire Chief); Car 102 (Deputy Chief); Car 103 (Deputy Chief); Car 104 (Deputy Chief); Car 105 (Deputy Chief)	Car 161 (Mechanical Division); Car 162 (Mechanical Division); Car 163 (Mechanical Division); Car 164 (Mechanical Division); Car 166 (Mechanical Division); Car 167 (Mechanical Division); Car 170 (Mechanical Division); Car 180 (Training Division); Car 181 (Training Division); Car 182 (Training Officer); Car 183 (Training Officer); Car 184 (Training Division); Training Vehicle 01; Training Vehicle 02	7535 Ninth Line	2010-12
Fire Prevention & Life Safety	City Centre					Car 121 (Prevention); Car 122 (Prevention); Car 123 (Prevention); Car 124 (Prevention); Car 125 (Public Education); Car 126 (Public Education); Car 127	300 City Centre Drive	
Spare Apparatus		Pumper 150; Pumper 151; Pumper 152; Pumper 153; Pumper 154; Pumper 155	Squad 150; Squad 151	Aerial 150; Aerial 151; Aerial 152	Car 110 (District Chief)		Various Locations	

=== Apparatus glossary ===
- Pumper - Standard pumper truck. Pumpers are equipped with firefighting gear as well as basic rescue tools and other equipment
- Squad - Rescue pumper truck. Squads are equipped with firefighting gear as well as a variety of rescue and extrication tools and equipment.
- Aerial - Rear-mounted aerial ladder or platform quint. Aerials have firefighting tools and specialized gear for certain emergency situations.
- Rescue - Heavy rescue truck. Rescues do not carry water or a pump and are equipped with rescue, extrication, and technical rescue equipment for specialized rescue calls.
- Car - Vehicle for District Chiefs and Platoon Chiefs and other miscellaneous department officials. Other Car Vehicles are assigned to the Mechanical Division and Training Division and have command gear and other equipment.
- Air Rehab - Combination air, light, and rehab support vehicle. This vehicle is equipped with an air refill system for refilling air cylinders. This unit also carries scene lighting, electrical items and other specialized equipment for rehab support.
- Tanker - Pumper-tanker / water tender. This vehicle carries water for fighting fires and it also has support equipment for other situations.
- Haz-Mat - Hazardous Materials Incident Team. This unit carries Haz-Mat (Hazardous Materials) response equipment and helps provide support for first responders who are entering into dangerous environments
- Tech Rescue - Technical Rescue vehicle. This vehicle is a large box on wheels and carries specialized equipment for all kinds of rescue situations. It carries various power tools and specialized rescue gear for rescues in the categories of Vehicle Rescue and Extrication, Building Collapse, Trench Rescues, etc.
- Special Operations - Technical Rescue / Haz-Mat support vehicle. This vehicle has equipment for supporting emergency personnel on specialized emergency incidents. This is a support vehicle that responds to all kinds of emergencies for support.
- Command Post - Incident command truck. This vehicle responds to emergencies to provide communications and control with either police personnel, fire personnel or Emergency Medical Services personnel or all other personnel communicating with dispatchers or members in the police, fire and emergency medical services.
- Rehab - Firefighter medical support vehicle. This vehicle carries items that help firefighters stay healthy and refreshed during large scale incidents or training events. Items used for this purpose include water, granola bars, tents, etc.

== Petro Canada Lubricants ==
Petro Canada has its own in-house fire equipment (emergency response team) at its lubricants facility in Mississauga. For major fires or other situations, Mississauga Fire would be asked to assist as primary responders.

== Notable incidents ==
- Air Canada Flight 189 disaster (1978)
- Mississauga train derailment (1979)
- Air France Flight 358 runway accident (2005)
- Mississauga Restaurant Bombing (2018)

== Members ==
As of 2006 MFES has 700 firefighters and personnel. The firefighters are represented by Local 1212 of IAFF.

== See also ==
- Peel Regional Paramedic Services
