= Etobicoke (disambiguation) =

Etobicoke could refer to:

- Etobicoke, district in Toronto
- Etobicoke—Lakeshore, electoral district
- Etobicoke Creek, electoral district
- Etobicoke North, electoral district
- Etobicoke (federal electoral district), electoral district
- Etobicoke North (provincial electoral district), electoral district
- Etobicoke Centre (federal electoral district), electoral district
- Etobicoke Centre (provincial electoral district), electoral district
- Etobicoke—Rexdale
- Etobicoke North GO Station - transit station
- Etobicoke General Hospital
- Etobicoke Collegiate Institute - High school
- Etobicoke School of the Arts - specialized high school
- Little Etobicoke Creek
