= 1979 Mississauga train derailment =

Industrial disaster in Ontario, Canada

Mississauga train derailment

Details
- Date: November 10, 1979; 11:53 p.m.
- Location: Mississauga, Ontario
- Coordinates: 43.5710°N 79.6401°W
- Country: Canada
- Operator: CP Rail
- Incident type: Derailment
- Cause: Overheated journal bearing

Statistics
- Trains: 1
- Crew: 2
- Deaths: 0

The Mississauga train derailment, also known as the Mississauga Miracle, occurred on November 10, 1979, in Mississauga, Ontario, Canada, when a CP Rail freight train carrying hazardous chemicals derailed and caught fire. More than 200,000 people were evacuated in the largest peacetime evacuation in North America until Hurricane Katrina. The fire was caused by a failure of the lubricating system. No deaths resulted from the incident.

== Background ==
In 1979, Mississauga, a suburb of Toronto, had a population of approximately 217,000 people. Over 46,000 city residents left the city for employment, while over 30,000 would enter the city from elsewhere. Ontario Highway 401 and Queen Elizabeth Way highway passed through the city, and most households had at least one vehicle for transportation.

Various events in the Peel Region, which includes Mississauga, prior to the derailment, caused emergency services to plan for various disasters. This included a natural gas explosion in 1969, necessitating the evacuation of 200 people, and the Air Canada Flight 621 plane crash on July 5, 1970, northeast of Malton International Airport (now known as Toronto Pearson International Airport. In 1974, five police forces merged to create the Peel Regional Police. The enlarged police force was able to assign senior personnel to create and coordinate specialised disaster plans with other agencies. Emergency plans were used in 1978 when an arsonist set fire to an oil refinery, causing 3,000 people to be evacuated from the surrounding area, and then when Air Canada Flight 189 crashed upon takeoff.

A few years prior, the chief of police for the Peel Region was in charge of managing a hijacking at Malton International Airport (now known as Toronto Pearson International Airport). He felt ill-prepared for the event, and afterwards organised emergency plans for various potential events in the region. This caused Peel to be one of the few regions in Ontario with a well-developed plan should an emergency happen, including a general evacuation plan for the city. Prior to this incident, the evacuation plan was implemented on a smaller scale during a major tank farm fire in the Mississauga community of Port Credit. Other agencies, such as Mississauga Transit, Mississauga Red Cross and Metro Toronto Ambulance, coordinated with Peel Region police during the implementation of emergency plans during various events in the region and found them satisfactory. The plan assumed that the Mississauga Fire and Emergency Services would act independently from the police. Peel Region police officers were required to know the various plans to be promoted within the force, causing most police officers to be knowledgeable of the plan's contents.

The evacuation plan consisted of four main elements: establishing a perimeter around the danger area and a further one out as a control area, the establishment of an emergency operations centre in a mobile van between the two perimeters, the establishment of an on-site commander, and a media centre between the two perimeters to disseminate information to the public.

== Train and cargo ==
Canadian Pacific Railway train 54 started its run in Windsor, Ontario. 90 minutes after departing, it arrived in Chatham, Ontario, where additional cars were attached; these were from a train that arrived from Sarnia. The train departed from Chatham at 6pm and travelled to London, Ontario, where the crew changed before continuing its journey east towards Toronto.

The 106 cars contained a mixed cargo. Eleven cars were filled with propane, which is explosive when exposed to heat. Four cars were filled with caustic soda; it can ignite combustible materials when exposed to water and destroy human tissue upon contact. Three cars contained styrene, a flammable liquid, which produces hallucinogenic effects when there are high concentrations of it in the air, and another three cars contained toluene, which is explosive when exposed to air and causes death when inhaled in high quantities. One car in the wreckage contained chlorine, which causes heart failure when humans are exposed to it in large amounts.

== Causes, derailment and initial explosion ==
The thirty-third car of the train, carrying toluene, used a journal bearing on its wheels; this configuration caused heat to develop by the friction between the moving axle and the car above. To prevent overheating, oil was used as lubrication; when lubrication is improperly applied, the journal box overheats, resulting in a hot box. Residents observing the train outside of Mississauga reported seeing smoke and sparks in the middle section of the train, while residents in Mississauga reported that the train was on fire.

After the train passed the Burnhamthorpe Road crossing, the thirty-third car lost one of its axles, and the wheels crashed through a fence and into a residential backyard. The train continued until it reached the Mavis Road crossing three minutes later at 11:53pm, where the undercarriage left the track. Twenty-three cars followed the derailed car and crashed into each other. The impact caused some propane cars to be set on fire. Tankers containing styrene and toluene were punctured and spilled their contents onto the track beds. Various flammable liquids were ignited within a minute of the crash, causing one tank car to explode. A yellowish-orange fire rose 1,500 m (5,000 ft) into the air, and could be seen 100 km (60 mi) away.

== Aftermath ==
No one was injured during the derailment, but buildings and vehicles were damaged. Larry Krupa, an engineer on the train, closed a cock on the thirty-second car, which allowed another engineer to drive the front of the train away from the wreckage. The derailment cut off power to the city garage, where firetrucks would refuel, so firefighters had to travel to neighbouring municipalities to refuel.

At 12:10am, a propane tank exploded showering the area with metal, destroyed three greenhouses and a recreational building and created a green haze. Five to ten minutes later, a propane car exploded, sending the car 800 m (2,620 ft) into the air, landing in an empty field 675 m (2,210 ft) north-east of the Mavis Road crossing. Another propane car exploded five minutes later, sending one end of the car 65 m (210 ft) away from the crash. The explosions were noticed by several people, who called emergency lines to report a gas explosion or plane crash. Others sought out the explosion to try to discover what happened, causing traffic jams towards the site of the derailment.

Krupa was later recommended for the Order of Canada for his bravery, which a later writer has described as "bordering on lunacy."

== Immediate response ==
Peel Regional police were the first to arrive on the site shortly within the first minute of the derailment. As the night continued, more officers of higher rank joined, as well as officers from the Ontario Provincial Police and Metro Toronto police. Firefighters arrived two minutes after the first police, after watching the explosion from their station. A half hour after the derailment there were over 100 firefighters on site with eight pumpers, three ladder trucks and two rescue vehicles. Various Peel police officers whose shift was supposed to end at midnight were ordered to remain on duty. Two kilometres of Mavis Road was closed to traffic and police tried to stop growing crowds of onlookers.

The police officers on the site activated the police's disaster plan and began perimeter control, ordering people to leave the area. They selected a car wash as the emergency operations centre, summoned the duty inspector to the site and started strategizing on how they would relay information to the media. At the police headquarters, officers called local services including the Peel Regional Paramedic Services, Metro Toronto Ambulance, Red Cross and Mississauga Transit. The firefighters concentrated on cooling cars with water, creating a controlled burn. This would cause the leaking gas to be burned, instead of released into the atmosphere, but would also mean the fire would continue for several days. The firefighters ordered the gas companies to cut off access to nearby buildings. The fire department contacted neighbouring departments and the gas company, while also calling local residents that they knew who had chemical expertise.

The conductor provided the train's manifest to the police and fire department at 12:40am, but it was indecipherable; the initial assessment from the police was that the tanker on fire did not contain chlorine. Police struggled to identify the various cars because of their vision being obscured by smoke and fire, the train numbers on the cars getting destroyed in the wreckage, and the derailment skewing the order of the cars. Another copy of the manifest was in the front part of the train, which travelled 6km away from the crash to Cooksville. A readable manifest was delivered to a command post at 1:30am. The railway assured police for several hours that none of the train's cars contained chlorine, even though police could smell the chemical. The legible manifest confirmed that dangerous chemicals were part of the cargo. The chemical experts gave inconsistent advice on how to manage the disaster, causing a provincial cabinet minister to call the chemical company to question their competence. By 1:45am, the police moved their emergency operations centre to an office in a local brick plant and police sealed off a 609-metre radius around the fire.

Throughout the morning, additional emergency services, machinery, and experts arrived to help manage the site. This included a team from Dow Chemical Company, who owned the chlorine in the tanker that derailed. They determined that it would be impossible to seal the chemical tanker leak while the propane fires were burning. Firefighters increased the spray of water and added more water lines, eventually applying 10 master streams through 4,000 metres of hose. They did not try to extinguish the flames, but rather tried to cool the cars and allow a controlled burn of the escaping gases. Shifting winds caused the police to move their command post to the Bell Canada building less than one kilometre north of the site.

== Evacuations and subsequent response ==
Several factors helped facilitate the evacuation. The traffic along the roads and highway was light because the evacuation was on a Sunday. The weekend was also a holiday weekend for Remembrance Day: since it was commemorated on a Sunday in 1979, many employees were not required to work on the following Monday. In total, thirteen evacuation notices were issued within twenty hours. The operation was managed by municipal, provincial, and federal levels of government, with four police forces, firefighters, over 100 ambulances helping with the evacuation.

=== Initial evacuations ===
Emergency services concluded that a chlorine tanker was close to a filled, lit propane tanker and was in danger of exploding. At 1:47am, the police chief issued the first evacuation order for 3,500 residents who lived nearby. The evacuation zone was widened when winds shifted in the night and emergency services gathered more information about the train's cargo. The police sent sound trucks to alert citizens of the evacuation and the Canadian Red Cross established Square One Shopping Centre as its first of many reception centres for evacuees. At 7:30am, decision-making committee was formed to lead the response for the next several days. This committee included the chief of police and fire chief for Mississauga, the regional chair of the Region of Peel Frank Bean, and the mayor of Mississauga Hazel McCallion. Ontario's Solicitor General Roy McMurtry and deputy minister John Hilton were later added to the group. At about 8:30am, an evacuation notice was issued to Mississauga Hospital and two adjacent nursing homes.

=== Subsequent evacuations ===
By 1:30pm, the boundaries of the evacuation zone were extended to the south to Lake Ontario. To the north, the boundary stopped before Square One, but the evacuation centre was emptied anyways and people transferred to other centres. About 218,000 people, out of a population of 284,000, were evacuated in under twenty hours. This included six nursing homes and three hospitals: Mississauga General, Oakville Trafalgar Memorial Hospital and Queensway Hospital.

On Monday, traffic was rerouted away from the city, an operation that would continue for the rest of the week. The stretch of the Queen Elizabeth Way that ran through Mississauga, the busiest stretch of highway in Canada at the time, was closed. During the day, railway crews removed the cars that had not derailed from the site. By 10am, three or four propane tanker cars continued to burn but the fire department had control over them. Procor, a railcar-producing company, prepared a steel patch to cover the hole in the leaking chlorine tanker car. The chemical experts determined that a few pockets of chlorine gas collected in low-lying areas near the site, but overall there was no hazard to healthy adults.

The propane fire ended at 2:30am on Tuesday and firefighting equipment was removed from the site. Later that morning, patients were returned to Queensway and Oakville-Trafalgar hospitals as they were only evacuated as a precaution and outside the official evacuation zones. At 3:30pm, the evacuation zone was reduced on the eastern and western sides, and five hours later they were reduced again in the eastern side, allowing 144,000 residents to return. Emergency crews attempted to seal the leaking chlorine car with a patch, but another tanker blocked access to the leak and it was only partially covered. The patch was supplemented by a neoprene air bag pressed over the opening by a timber mat, then secured by chains, reducing the chlorine leakage.

By Thursday, between 7.5 and 10 tons of liquid chlorine remained in the tanker, with the remaining cargo destroyed in the fire or dispersed over Lake Ontario. Water from the fire crews earlier in the week had mixed with the tanker's contents and created a slushy ice mixture on top of the liquid chlorine, making the chlorine difficult to remove. Experts worried that the ice would break off and fall into the chlorine, exposing the chlorine to air. They devised a plan to pump the chlorine out when favourable winds prevailed; the plan commenced at 11pm. They applied a liquid line below the ice and a vacuum line above it to prevent the ice from hindering operations. By Friday at noon, most of the chlorine had been shipped away from the site in trucks.

On Friday at 3:00pm, 37,000 residents were permitted to return home. The evacuation was fully lifted four hours later and residents who lived closest to the derailment site were permitted to return. Mississauga was reopened at 7:45pm and roadblocks were removed, with only the derailment site remaining closed to the public. The last reception centre was closed that evening and various police services ended their operations at midnight. CP Rail spent the day removing all wreckage except for the chlorine tanker car. The chlorine car was emptied and cleared on Monday, November 19.

A number of residents (mostly the extreme west and north of Mississauga) allowed evacuees to stay with them until the crisis abated. Some of these people were later moved again as their hosts were also evacuated. The evacuation was managed by various officials including the mayor of Mississauga, Hazel McCallion, the Peel Regional Police and other governmental authorities. McCallion sprained her ankle early during the crisis, but continued to hobble to press conferences.

== Aftermath ==
It was the largest peacetime evacuation in North American history until the evacuation of New Orleans due to Hurricane Katrina in 2005, and remained the second-largest until Hurricane Irma in 2017. It was the last major explosion in the Greater Toronto Area until the Sunrise Propane blast in 2008.

The government of Ontario ordered an official inquiry concerning railway safety when transporting dangerous goods. Some of the recommendations included giving municipal governments the authority to prepare emergency measures for various situations. The government implemented this recommendation by creating the Emergency Planning Office in May 1980. The Emergency Plans Act, passed by the Ontario government in 1983, required all of their departments to create a plan for providing services to an area during an emergency: these plans were then coordinated through the Emergency Planning Office.

As a result of the accident, rail regulators in both the U.S. and Canada required that any line used to carry hazardous materials into or through a populated area have hotbox detectors.

Larry Krupa was inducted into the North America Railway Hall of Fame for his contribution to the railway industry. He was recognized in the "National" division of the "Railway Workers & Builders" category.

Hazel McCallion, in her first term as mayor at the time of the accident, was continuously re-elected until her retirement in 2014 at age 93.

== In popular culture ==
- "Party Rapp," a 1979 rap song by Mr. Q, references the derailment, the first known explicit reference to Canada in a Canadian hip hop song.
- "Trainwreck 1979," a 2014 rock single by Canadian band Death From Above 1979, is about the derailment:

It ran off the track, 11-79
While the immigrants slept, there wasn't much time
The mayor came calling and got 'em outta bed
They packed up their families and headed upwind
A poison cloud, a flaming sky, 200,000 people and no one died
And all before the pocket dial, yeah!

- The derailment is mentioned in the season four Bob and Margaret episode "A Very Fishy Christmas".

== See also ==
- List of rail accidents (1970–79)
- List of rail accidents in Canada
- Lac-Mégantic rail disaster
- 1990 Bangkok gas explosion

== Works cited ==
- "Mississauga Train Derailment (1979)". Local history. City of Mississauga.
- "The Mississauga Evacuation, Final Report, November 1981". Ministry of the Solicitor General of Ontario. Archived from the original on 2006-03-24.
- "Miracle of Mississauga", Toronto Sun Publishing, 1979.

=== References ===
- Havey, Mary Clare; Dickie, Allan; Allen, David (1980). Derailment: the Mississauga Miracle. Toronto: Government of Ontario.
- Henstra, Daniel (2011). "The Dynamics of Policy Change: A Longitudinal Analysis of Emergency Management in Ontario, 1950–2010". Journal of Policy History. 23 (3): 399–428. ISSN 1528-4190.
- Scanlon, T. Joseph (1989). "Toxic Chemicals and Emergency Management: The Evacuation of Mississauga, Ontario, Canada". In Rosenthal, Uriel; Charles, Michael T.; Hart, Paul T. (eds.). Coping with crises: the management of disasters, riots, and terrorism. Springfield, Illinois: C.C. Thomas. pp. 303–322. ISBN 978-0-398-05597-4.
