= Loafers Lake =

Lake in the Greater Toronto Area, Canada

Loafer's Lake
- Location of the lake in Southern Ontario
- Location: Regional Municipality of Peel, Ontario
- Coordinates: 43°43′24″N 79°48′05″W
- Part of: Great Lakes Basin
- Primary inflows: Etobicoke Creek
- Primary outflows: Etobicoke Creek
- Basin countries: Canada
- Max. length: 250 m (820 ft)
- Max. width: 130 m (430 ft)
- Surface elevation: 231 metres (758 ft)

Loafer's Lake is a lake in Brampton, Regional Municipality of Peel in Greater Toronto Area region of Ontario, Canada. It is in the Great Lakes Basin and lies on Etobicoke Creek.

The lake is part of Loafer's Lake Park, a Brampton municipal park, which also has a recreation centre with parking. The Etobicoke Creek Trail runs past the lake through the park. Loafer's Lake Recreation Center is located at 30 Loafer's Lake Lane.
