= Air France Flight 358 =

2005 aviation accident in Canada

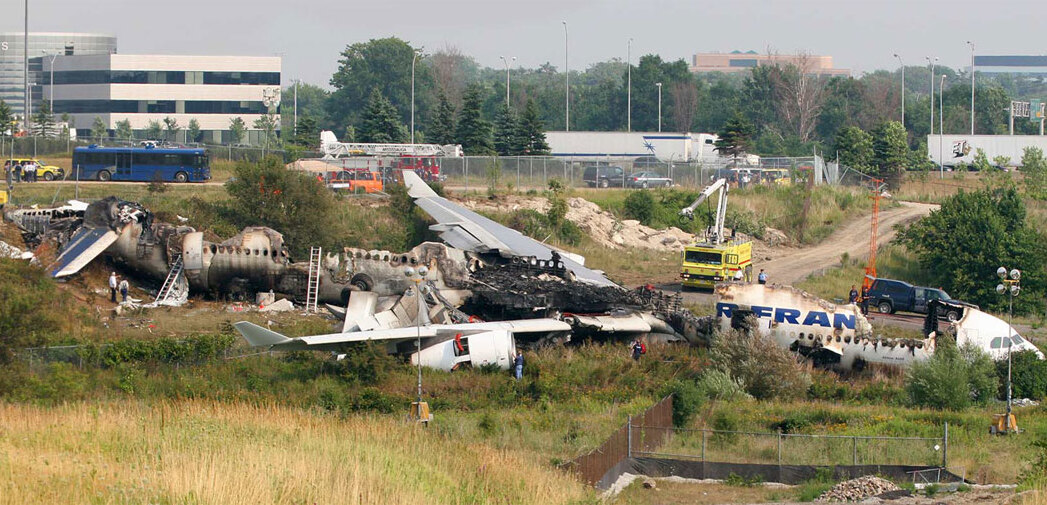
- Wreckage of the aircraft

Accident
- Date: 2 August 2005
- Summary: Crashed following runway excursion in bad weather and pilot error
- Site: Toronto Pearson International Airport, Ontario, Canada; 43°39′23.2″N 79°37′29.0″W

Aircraft
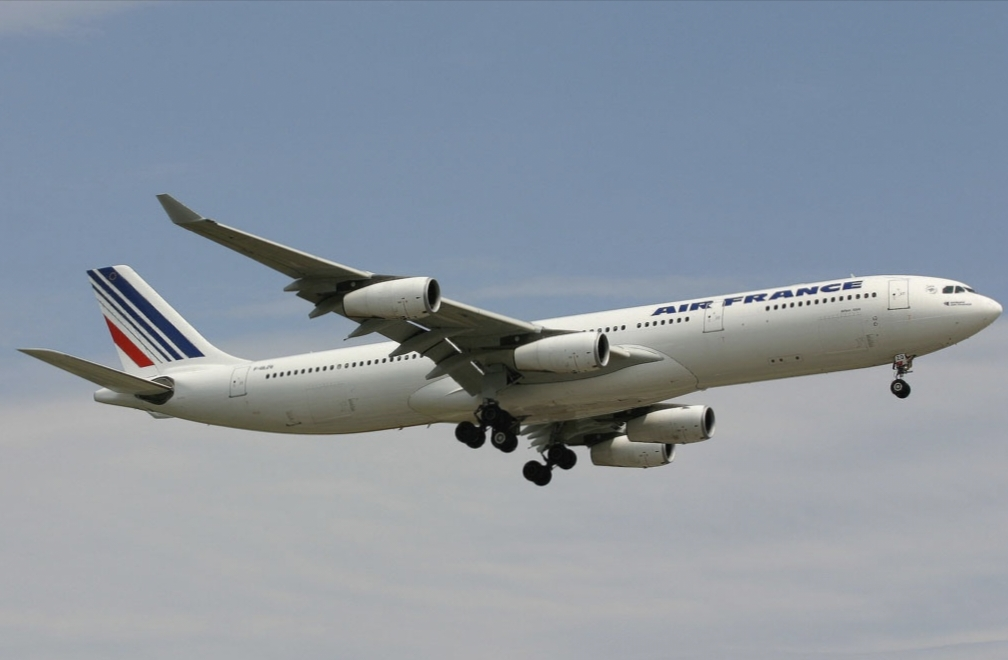
- F-GLZQ, the aircraft involved in the accident, seen in July 2005
- Aircraft type: Airbus A340-313E (Note: The "3" in the suffix denotes that it was a -300 series variant of the A340; "13E" denotes that it was equipped with CFM International CFM56-5C4 engines, with E denoting "Enhanced" variant which indicates that it features an increased MTOW of up to 275 tonnes (606,000 lb).)
- Operator: Air France
- IATA flight No.: AF358
- ICAO flight No.: AFR358
- Call sign: AIRFRANS 358
- Registration: F-GLZQ
- Flight origin: Charles de Gaulle Airport; Paris, France
- Destination: Toronto Pearson International Airport, Mississauga, Ontario, Canada
- Occupants: 309
- Passengers: 297
- Crew: 12
- Fatalities: 0
- Injuries: 43
- Survivors: 309

Path of Flight 358. Dotted lines indicate the normal landing trajectory.

Air France Flight 358 was a regularly scheduled international flight from Charles de Gaulle Airport in Paris, France, to Toronto Pearson International Airport in Ontario, Canada. On the afternoon of 2 August 2005, while landing at Pearson airport, the Airbus A340 operating the route overran the runway and crashed into nearby Etobicoke Creek, approximately 300 m (1,000 ft) beyond the end of the runway. All 309 passengers and crew on board the Airbus survived, but 12 people sustained serious injuries. The accident highlighted the vital role played by highly trained flight attendants during an emergency.

Due to inclement weather, 540 flights departing and arriving at Pearson were cancelled. Many small and mid-sized aircraft due to arrive were diverted to other Canadian airports in Ottawa, Hamilton, and Winnipeg. Most of the larger aircraft were diverted to Montreal, Syracuse, New York, and Buffalo, New York. Flights from Vancouver were turned back. The crash of Air France Flight 358 was the biggest crisis to hit Toronto Pearson since the airport's involvement in Operation Yellow Ribbon.

Jean Lapierre, the Canadian Minister of Transport, referred to Flight 358 as a "miracle" because everyone on board survived, despite the aircraft's complete destruction. Other press sources described the accident as the "Miracle in Toronto", the "Toronto Miracle," the " 'Miracle' Escape," and the "Miracle of Runway 24L."

The accident was investigated by the Transportation Safety Board of Canada (TSB), with a final report issued on 13 December 2007. The unfavourable weather conditions, and the poor landing decisions made by the flight crew, were found to be major factors leading to the crash. The visibility was poor, the assigned runway was short (the airport's shortest), the plane touched down nearly halfway through the runway and the thrust reversers were not on full power until 17 seconds after touchdown.

== Background ==
=== Aircraft ===
The aircraft involved was an Airbus A340-313E, with aircraft registration F-GLZQ; it was powered by four CFM International CFM56-5C4 engines. It was delivered to Air France in September 1999, and had logged 3,711 flights for a total of 28,426 flight hours.

=== Crew ===
There were 12 crew members on board the Airbus. The flight crew consisted of 57-year-old Captain Alain Rosaye, who had logged 15,411 total flight hours, and 43-year-old First Officer Frédéric Naud, who had logged 4,834 hours of flight time.

=== Passengers ===
Of the 297 passengers on board the aircraft, there were 168 men, 118 women, 8 children, and 3 infants. There was a mix of different nationalities, including 104 Canadians, 101 French citizens, 19 Italians, 14 Americans, 8 Indians, 7 Britons, 1 Egyptian, and 8 Danes. The passengers consisted of business travellers, vacationers, and students. Three of the passengers were seated in crew seats, one in the third occupant seat of the flight deck and two in the flight crew rest area.

== Accident ==
At 16:03 EDT (20:03 UTC) on 2 August 2005, Air France Flight 358 overshot the end of the runway after landing on Runway 24L at Toronto Pearson International Airport, and came to rest in a small ravine just outside the airport perimeter. All 297 passengers and 12 crew members successfully evacuated the aircraft. Twelve major injuries resulted from the accident and there were no fatalities; the other occupants suffered minor or no injuries. The aircraft was destroyed in a post-crash fire.

The flight landed during exceptionally poor weather — severe winds, heavy rain showers, and localized thunderstorms near the airport (see weather conditions below) — and touched down farther along the runway than usual. Some passengers reported that the plane was rocking from side to side before landing, possibly due to turbulence and gusting winds associated with the storm systems. One passenger described the crash as like a "car accident, but it keeps going and going, non-stop."

The plane had been cleared to land at 16:01 EDT on Runway 24L, which, at 2,744 metres (9,003 ft) in length, is the shortest runway at Pearson Airport. After touchdown, the aircraft did not stop before the end of the runway, but continued for another 300 metres (1,000 ft) until it slid into the Etobicoke Creek ravine at a speed of 148 km/h (80 kn; 92 mph), on the western edge of the airport immediately north of Highway 401.

After the aircraft had stopped, the crew saw fire outside and began evacuation. When the emergency exits were opened, one of the right middle exit slides (R3) deflated after being punctured by debris from the aircraft, while one of the left slides (L2) failed to deploy at all for unknown reasons. The two rear left exits remained closed due to the fire. Some passengers jumped from the aircraft to escape. The actions of the flight attendants, who ensured that all of the passengers were able to exit the plane quickly, contributed to the safe evacuation of everyone on board. They made sure everyone was evacuated safely within the required 90-second time.

Emergency response teams arrived on site within 52 seconds of the accident occurring. The TSB official report states that "the first response vehicle arrived at the scene within one minute of the crash alarm sounding".

=== Immediate aftermath ===
After the accident, some of the passengers, including those who were injured, scrambled up the ravine onto Highway 401, which runs almost parallel to the runway. Peel Regional Police located the first officer and several passengers along the highway, receiving assistance from motorists who had been passing the airport at the time of the crash. Some of the injured passengers and the co-pilot were taken directly to hospitals by motorists, and the uninjured passengers were transported by motorists to the airport. The main fire continued to burn for two hours, dying out just before 18:00 EDT. All of the fires were extinguished by the early afternoon of the following day, at which time investigators were able to begin their work.

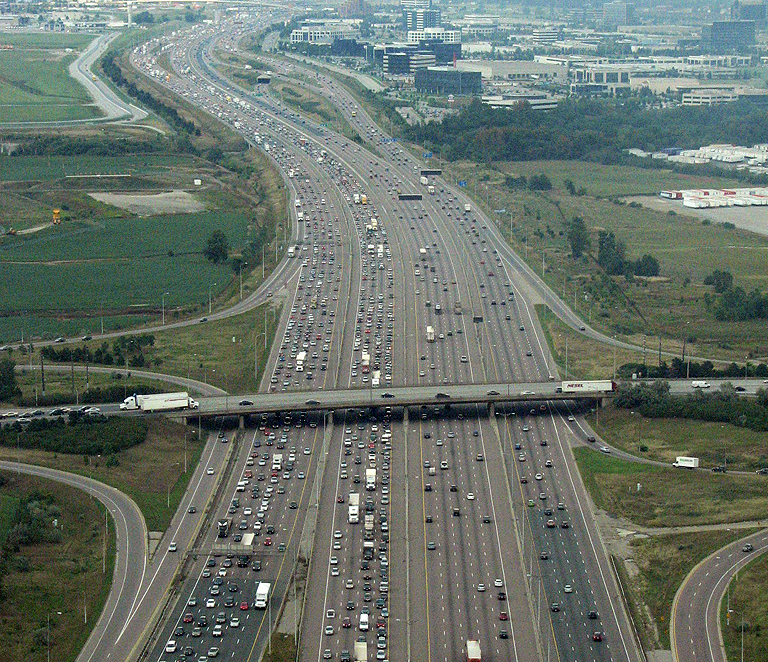
The accident occurred near the widest segment of Highway 401

The accident led to the cancellation or diversion of hundreds of flights, with ripple effects throughout the North American air traffic system. Four of the five runway surfaces at Pearson Airport were back in service by the night of 2 August, but the flight and passenger backlog continued through the next day.

The accident also caused heavy traffic congestion throughout Toronto's highway system. Highway 401 is one of the world's busiest highways, and is the main route through the Greater Toronto Area; the crash occurred near the highway's widest point where eighteen lanes of traffic are directed toward major intersections with Highways 403 and 410 to the southwest and Highway 427 to the northeast. Although the fire was extinguished within hours, there was considerable congestion on the highway for days after the accident due to motorists slowing down or pulling over to view the wreckage. This created numerous traffic collisions, prompting the Ontario Provincial Police to increase patrols along that section of the highway.

== Weather conditions ==
A METAR (weather observation) for Pearson was released almost exactly at the time of the accident. It stated that the weather at 20:04 UTC (16:04 EDT) consisted of winds from 340° true (north-northwest) at 24 kn (44 km/h) gusting to 33 kn (61 km/h), with 1 1/4 miles (2.0 km) visibility in thunderstorms and heavy rain. The ceiling was overcast at 4,500 feet (1,400 m) above ground level with towering cumulus clouds. The temperature was 23 °C (73 °F). The METAR for 21:00 UTC (17:00 EDT), nearly an hour after the accident, shows wind backing to the south and improving conditions generally, while noting smoke aloft from the burning plane.

The Canadian Broadcasting Corporation reported that the accident happened two hours after a ground stop was declared at the airport because of severe thunderstorms in the area ("red alert" status, which, for safety reasons, halts all ground activity on the apron and gate area. Aircraft can still land, and take off if still in queue).

== Injuries ==
The table below summarizes the injuries as reported by the TSB.

	Crew	Passengers	Total
Fatal	0	0	0
Serious	2	10	12
Minor / None	10	287	297
Total	12	297	309

Most of the injuries occurred to passengers and crew located in the flight deck and forward cabin. Of the twelve occupants who sustained major injuries, nine suffered the injuries from the impact and three from the evacuation. According to passenger reports, the leap from the aircraft to the ground caused numerous injuries, including broken legs and ruptured vertebrae. Captain Rosaye sustained back and head injuries during the impact of the crash when his seat was wrenched out of place by the force of the impact, causing him to hit his head against the overhead controls. Minor injuries included twisted ankles, sore necks, bruises and effects from smoke inhalation.

A total of 33 people were taken to various hospitals within and outside Toronto for treatment, of which 21 were treated for minor injuries and released. The York-Finch campus of the Humber River Regional Hospital treated seven people for smoke inhalation. William Osler Health Centre, Etobicoke General Hospital, Credit Valley Hospital, and Peel Memorial Hospital were additional nearby hospitals that had admitted victims of the crash.

In addition to the Greater Toronto Airport Authority, on-site emergency services were also provided by Peel Regional Paramedic Services, Peel Regional Police, Mississauga Fire and Emergency Services, Toronto EMS, and the Royal Canadian Mounted Police. Ontario Provincial Police patrolled Highway 401. Toronto Transit Commission transit buses were used as shelter for victims near the crash site.

== Investigation ==
=== Representation ===
Once the emergency response teams had finished their work, the Transportation Safety Board of Canada (TSB) took control of the accident site and led the investigation, with the cooperation of several other organizations in accordance with the provisions of ICAO Annex 13:

- Transport Canada as the country of occurrence's representative
- Air France as the operator
- Airbus as the airframe manufacturer
- GE Aviation as the engine manufacturer
- French Department of Transport representing the country of operator and airframe manufacturer
- United States National Transportation Safety Board representing the country of the engine manufacturer

=== Evidence ===
The flight data recorder and cockpit voice recorder were sent to France for analysis. Preliminary results indicated that the plane landed 1,220 m (4,000 ft) from the start of the 2,743 m (9,000 ft) runway (much further along than normal) at a ground speed of 148 knots (274 km/h; 170 mph)—140 knots being considered normal—with a tailwind, skidded down the runway and was traveling over 70 knots (130 km/h; 81 mph) as it overran the runway and fell into the ravine. Tire marks extended 490 m (1,610 ft) indicating emergency braking action.

Réal Levasseur Shedalin, the TSB's lead investigator for the accident, said the plane landed too far down the runway to have been able to stop properly on such wet pavement. Investigators found no evidence of engine trouble, brake failure, or problems with the spoilers or thrust reversers. Why evacuation chutes failed to deploy from two exits remains under study. Some fleeing passengers were forced to jump some 2 m (6.6 ft) to the ground.

One passenger took four photographs of the evacuation with his camera, which were released to the media. The final TSB report refers to the photographs and draws conclusions about the nature of the disaster based on them. Mark Rosenker, the acting chairman of the National Transportation Safety Board (NTSB), criticized the concept of passengers taking photographs of disasters, stating, "Your business is to get off the airplane. Your business is to help anybody who needs help." According to Rosenker, taking photographs during an evacuation of an airliner is irresponsible. Helen Muir, an aerospace psychology professor at Cranfield University in the United Kingdom, stated that pausing during evacuations "is just what we don't want people to do." Nevertheless, Muir acknowledged that photographs are "very valuable to accident investigators".

=== Irregularities ===
The final TSB report states: "During the flare, the aircraft entered a heavy shower area, and the crew's forward visibility was significantly reduced as they entered the downpour." This suggests the possibility that the plane was hit in heavy weather by a wet downburst, causing the Airbus to land long. Based on the Air France A340-313 Quick Reference Handbook (QRH), page 34G, "Landing Distance Without Autobrake", the minimum distance of 1,155 m (3,789 ft) would be used in dry conditions to bring the aircraft to a complete stop. In wet conditions with a 5-knot tailwind, reversers operative, and 6.3 mm (0.25 in) of downpour on the runway, the braking distance increases to 2,016 m (6,614 ft). There was not enough remaining runway available at the touchdown point of AF 358.

Other possible irregularities mentioned in a government report on the accident:

- Passenger oxygen tanks supposedly exploded in the heat of the fire. (Emergency passenger oxygen is provided via a chemical oxygen generator but the aircraft would have been carrying therapeutic oxygen for passengers requiring a constant supply throughout the flight and first aid situations.)
- The copy of the "E.R.S. Aircraft Crash Chart" at Pearson International Airport did not include blueprints for the Airbus A340 model of planes at the time of the accident. The blueprints would have contained vital information with regard to search and rescue efforts, and would have provided the location of fuel and pressurized gas tanks so that rescue crews could avoid them.

Other irregularities that were not confirmed nor denied by officials:

- 12 seconds elapsed between the moment the plane touched down and when pilots applied the thrust reversers, which are used to assist braking
- One of the aircraft doors opened on its own during the landing, according to witnesses. Black boxes are unable to reveal this data.

=== Conclusions ===
The TSB concluded in its final report that the pilots had missed cues that would have prompted them to review their decision to land, and also that:

- Air France had no procedures related to distance required from thunderstorms during approaches and landings.
- After the autopilot had been disengaged, the pilot flying increased engine thrust in reaction to a decrease in airspeed and a perception that the aircraft was sinking. The power increase contributed to an increase in aircraft energy and the aircraft deviated above the flight path.
- At 300 feet (90 m) above ground level, the wind changed from a headwind to a tailwind.
- While approaching the threshold, the aircraft entered an intense downpour and the forward visibility became severely reduced.
- When the aircraft was near the threshold, the crew members committed to the landing and believed their go-around option no longer existed.
- The pilot not flying did not make the standard callouts concerning the spoilers and thrust reversers during the landing roll. This contributed to the delay in the pilot flying selecting the thrust reversers.
- There were no landing distances indicated on the operational flight plan for a contaminated runway condition at Toronto / Lester B. Pearson International Airport.
- The crew did not calculate the landing distance required for runway 24L despite aviation routine weather reports (METARs) calling for thunderstorms. The crew was not aware of the margin of error.
- The topography at the end of the runway and the area beyond the end of Runway 24L contributed to aircraft damage and injuries to crew and passengers.

The TSB advised changes to bring Canadian runway standards in line with those used abroad, either by extending them to have a 300-metre (1,000 ft) runway end safety area (RESA) or, where that is not possible, providing an equivalently effective backup method of stopping aircraft. Other recommendations made by the TSB included having the Canadian Department of Transport establish clear standards limiting approaches and landings in convective weather for all operators at Canadian airports, and mandate training for all pilots involved in Canadian air operations to better enable them to make landing decisions in bad weather.

== Litigation ==
=== Passenger class action ===
Within a few days of the accident, a class action suit was filed on behalf of all passengers on board by representative plaintiff Suzanne Deak to the Ontario Superior Court of Justice. The attorneys representing Deak and the passengers were Gary R. Will and Paul Miller from Will Barristers in Toronto. The plaintiffs sought payments for general and aggravated damages in the amount of $75 million, and payments for special damages and pecuniary damages in the amount of $250 million. A second class action lawsuit was also filed by plaintiffs Sahar Alqudsi and Younis Qawasmi (her husband) for $150 million a few days later. Ultimately, both suits were consolidated because only one lawsuit was allowed to proceed to court.

In December 2009, a $12 million settlement was reached between Air France and the class representing 184 of the 297 passengers (no crew members included) aboard Flight 358. Air France agreed to pay $10 million and was released from passengers' claims stemming from the accident, according to the judgment's summary. Airbus and Goodrich, the company that made the emergency evacuation system on the plane, agreed to pay $1.65 million, and claims against them in a lawsuit were released. The settlement resolved the claims of 184 passengers and their families; 45 other passengers had opted out of the suit, while 68 others had already agreed to a settlement with Air France.

J.J. Camp, a Vancouver lawyer representing claimants, stated that passengers seriously harmed with either physical or psychological injuries were eligible for the maximum payout of $175,000. Passengers who were not seriously harmed in the accident would receive the minimum payment of between $5,000 and $10,000.

=== Air France lawsuit ===
In June 2008, almost 3 years after the accident, Air France filed a lawsuit against the Greater Toronto Airports Authority, NAV Canada, and the Government of Canada for $180 million. In the statement of claim filed with the Ontario Superior Court of Justice, Air France alleged that the "GTAA failed to provide a safe environment for the conduct of civil air operations." The statement also claimed that "The overrun and the consequent injuries to persons and damage to property were caused solely by the negligence of the defendants". Air France says Transport Canada was "negligent" by not implementing the recommendations of a coroner's inquest into the 1978 crash that urged the creation of a 300-metre safety area to give aircraft more room to stop after landing.

== Aftermath ==
An inquiry by the TSB found runway safety zones at the end of runways at some Canadian airports to be below accepted international standards. The report also highlighted that Toronto Pearson's runways meet current Canadian standards, and that runway 24L has a de facto 150-metre (500 ft) RESA. The TSB also suggested that precautions should be taken by airlines when landing in bad weather.

In 1978, Air Canada Flight 189 had also crashed into Etobicoke Creek, the site of the AF358 crash, resulting in two deaths. The Air Canada DC-9 blew a tire causing an aborted takeoff on the 24R-06L runway, crashing north of the AF358 accident scene and deeper into the ravine. After the Air France crash in 2005, there were calls for the ravine to be filled or spanned by a bridge, but others argued that such an undertaking would have been prohibitively expensive. The runway on which the Air France plane landed in August 2005, 24L-06R, is an east–west runway with a length of 2.7 kilometres (8,900 ft). This runway did not yet exist at the time of the Air Canada crash in 1978. At that time, the current runway 24R-06L was numbered 24L-06R, and the current runway 23-05 was numbered 24R-06L.

== Dramatization ==
The Canadian television series Mayday (also known as Air Crash Investigation, Air Emergency, Air Disasters or Mayday: Air Disaster) featured the accident in the season 4 opening episode titled "Miracle Escape" ("Desperate Escape" in certain markets), which included interviews with survivors and a dramatization of the accident.

This accident is also featured on The Weather Channel television programs Storm Stories and Why Planes Crash.

== See also ==
- Korean Air Flight 631 – an Airbus A330-332 overran the runway while landing in Cebu due to a failure with the hydraulic system. All 173 passengers and crew members survived the incident with no injuries.
- PenAir Flight 3296 – a Saab 2000 aircraft overran the runway during landing at Unalaska Airport in Alaska, crashing through a perimeter fence and stopping near a harbor. One passenger was killed, another seriously injured, and eight sustained minor injuries.
- Air India Express Flight 1344 – a Boeing 737-800 overshot the runway at Calicut International Airport in Kerala, India, amid heavy rain. The aircraft broke apart, resulting in 21 fatalities among the 190 passengers and crew.
- Caspian Airlines Flight 6936 – a McDonnell Douglas MD-83 overran the runway at Mahshahr Airport in Iran, coming to rest on a nearby road. All 144 occupants survived, with two injuries reported.
- Runway excursion
- Engineered materials arrestor system
- Ground effect (aerodynamics)
- List of accidents and incidents involving airliners by airline
- Low-level windshear alert system
- Microburst
- NEXRAD
- Wind shear
