= Ontario Gurdwaras Committee =

- ਓਨਟੇਰੀਓ ਗੁਰਦੁਵਾਰਾਜ਼ ਕਮੇਟੀ
- Official logo

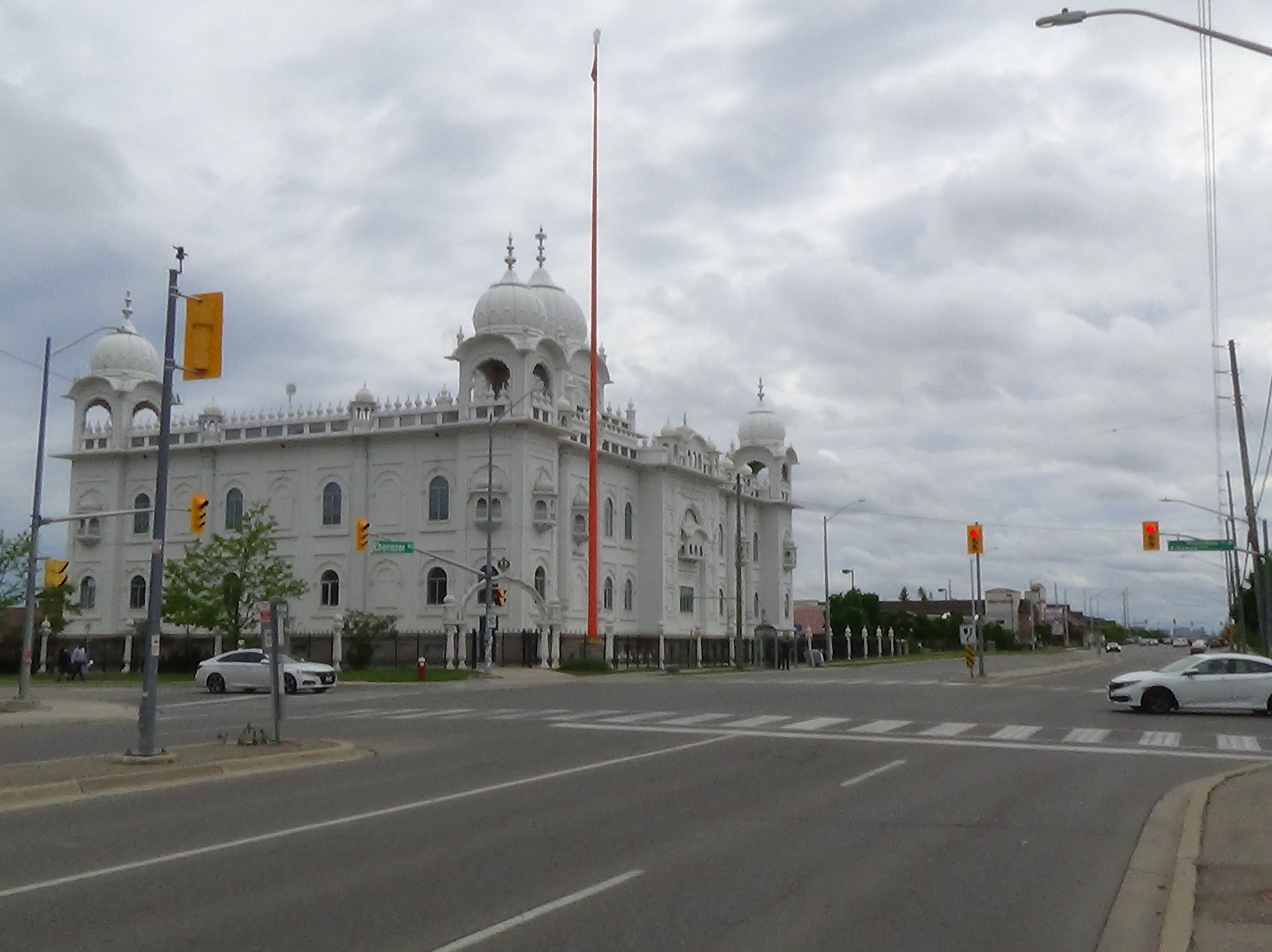
- Gurdwara Dasmesh Darbar in Brampton, Ontario
- Abbreviation: OGC
- Formation: 1985
- Type: Nonprofit
- Purpose: Management of gurdwaras and safeguarding Sikh interests
- Headquarters: Sri Guru Nanak Sikh Centre, Brampton, Ontario
- Region served: Ontario, Quebec, Eastern Canada
- Members: 20 gurdwaras
- Spokesperson: Amarjit Singh Mann
- Affiliations: British Columbia Sikh Gurdwaras Council, Sikh Sports Club Ontario, Sikh Students Association, Sikh Federation UK
- Staff: 1
- Volunteers: over 500
- Website: ontariogurdwarascommittee.com

The Ontario Gurdwaras Committee (OGC; Punjabi: ਓਨਟੇਰੀਓ ਗੁਰਦੁਵਾਰਾਜ਼ ਕਮੇਟੀ) is a Canadian independent, non-profit organization representing over 20 gurdwaras—Sikh places of worship—located in Ontario and Quebec. It organizes such events as the annual Khalsa Day parade in Mississauga.

It should not be confused with the Ontario Sikhs and Gurdwara Council (OSGC), another organization.

== Community activities ==
=== Khalsa Day Parade ===
The OGC organizes the annual Khalsa Day parade in the Greater Toronto Area (GTA), crossing two different cities in two different regional municipalities.

From 2001 until 2004, the route of the parade was wholly in the City of Mississauga, where it began at Sri Guru Singh Sabha and culminated at the Ontario Khalsa Darbar. In 2001, the parade had over 100,000 attendees.

Since 2009, the parade has been held during the first Sunday in May every year—the date was chosen by OGC so that it will be the sole major event in the GTA that weekend.

Over 100,000 people attended the parade in 2012. In 2013, over 100,000 again participated in the celebrations which started at the Sri Guru Singh Sabha located in the Malton neighbourhood of Mississauga and culminated at the Sikh Spiritual Centre located in Toronto, Ontario.

In 2018, the Khalsa Day Parade saw over 250,000 people attend. The parade was started by First Nations in a move towards reconciliation of the fact that diaspora Sikhs are settlers in traditional First Nations lands.

=== Other ===
The Ontario Gurdwaras Committee also participates in various community and interfaith dialogues.

On August 11, 2012, at Nathan Phillips Square located within Toronto City Hall, the OGC along with other Sikh and non-Sikh organizations and institutions held a candlelight vigil in honour of those murdered in the Wisconsin Sikh Temple Shooting. Also in 2012, the OGC stood in solidarity with the victims of the Sandy Hook Elementary School shooting which took place in Newtown Connecticut. In addition to attending a multi-faith vigil, a simran was held in memory of the victims at Sri Guru Singh Sabha, a OGC member gurdwara in Malton Ontario.

In 2013, OGC was part of an interfaith coalition against casinos in Ontario, as a signatory to the "Interfaith Statement Opposing Casino Expansion in Ontario" in April that year.

Through its member gurdwara, Sri Guru Nanak Sikh Centre (Glidden Road), the OGC also supported the Campaign against Child Poverty.

On April 1, 2014, the Ontario Gurdwaras Committee took part in the inauguration of April as Sikh Heritage Month in the Province of Ontario. These celebrations were held in Queens Park and hosted by Jagmeet Singh, Member of Provincial Parliament for Bramalea—Gore—Malton.

In 2016, the OGC, along with the OSGC and the Punjabi media in Ontario, made a joint effort to provide aid to those affected by the Fort McMurray wildfire by collectively donating over $400,000 on behalf of the Sikh community of Ontario. The funds were provided directly to Alberta Premier Rachel Notley and the mayor of RM of Wood Buffalo Melissa Blake.

On a local level, the OGC held a community town hall in cooperation with United Sikhs to address the increase in youth violence in the Brampton area of Ontario. Hundreds of community residents attended the town hall, so much so that many had to be turned away at the door. Members of the Peel Regional Police as well as local elected officials made a number of promises to community members. The OGC promised to work with youth by having anti-violence and newcomer orientations at its member gurdwaras.

=== Lobbying against Government of India ===
In early 2018, the OGC led a worldwide initiative to stop the continued interference of the Government of India in the domestic and internal affairs of the Sikh diaspora.

OGC instigated a ban of Indian officials from entering the premises of Sikh places of worship in any official capacity. Eventually, over 400 gurdwaras in Canada, Australia, Europe and the United States of America, as well as many other countries, signed on to this effort.

That year, the OGC also wrote a notice and lobbied Canadian Members of Parliament regarding the matter.

Following lobbying in regards to the Indian government's pressure tactics on the City of Brampton to not allow an independent Punjab Pavilion in the annual Carabram program, the Canadian Minister of Foreign Affairs Chrystia Freeland offered a stiff reply against the Government of India. In May 2018, an improvised explosive device was set off outside the Bombay Bhel restaurant in Mississauga by unknown individuals. After the Government of India set up an information line, both the OGC as well the Peel Regional Police rebuked the move for immediately undermining and interfering with an ongoing police investigation.

In March 2023, following the 2021 federal election and ahead of the 2025 election, the OGC teamed up with the British Columbia Gurdwaras Council to publish a report calling out alleged Indian interference in Canada's politics. The report notes:

These activities include infiltrating Sikh Gurdwaras, recruiting informants and agent provocateurs within the community, deceptively interjecting the Indian narratives into Canadian media reporting, and influencing Canadian diplomats, security officers and MPs.

The report called on the Canadian government to take a tougher approach on the foreign interference file—legally, through the Criminal Code and the Canada Elections Act, and diplomatically, by declaring diplomats persona non grata where the evidence warrants so. The OGC and BCGC also called on Canada's national security agencies to disclose relevant information about India's record of election meddling and political interference in Canada.

== See also ==
- Sikhism in Canada
- Sikhism in Ontario
