= Brampton Fire and Emergency Services =

Coordinates: 43°42′04″N 79°44′27″W

Operational area
- Country: Canada
- Address: 8 Rutherford Road South, Brampton, ON L6W 3J1

Agency overview
- Established: 1974
- Fire chief: Bill Boyes
- EMS level: First Aid/ Emergency First Responder Level

Facilities and equipment
- Stations: 13
- Ambulances: See Peel Regional Paramedic Services

Website
- Official website

Brampton Fire and Emergency Services provides fire protection, technical rescue services, hazardous materials response, and first responder emergency medical assistance to the City of Brampton in the Peel Region of Ontario, Canada. It operates thirteen fire halls and coordinates with other emergency services in Peel Region and the Greater Toronto Area:

- Mississauga Fire and Rescue
- Toronto Fire Services
- Caledon Fire Department
- Vaughan Fire Rescue

== Operations ==
=== Fire Stations and Apparatus ===
Mississauga, Brampton, and Caledon underwent a region-wide renumbering of stations and apparatus in the 1990s. Each station is assigned a 3 digit number and each apparatus is given an alpha-numeric callsign corresponding with the station number. The alphabetic prefix identifies the type of apparatus, the first numerical digit identifies the municipality, and the remaining two numerical digits identify the station. The municipality identifiers are '1' for Mississauga, '2' for Brampton, and '3' for Caledon.

For example, Station 201 would be Brampton's no. 1 station and P201 would be a pumper assigned to it, and so on. Spare apparatus (for Mississauga and Brampton) would be numbered with a 5 as the second numerical digit in the number (P251, A254, etc.).

A list of fire halls and locations and current apparatus as of April 2019:

Station #	Pumper Company or Squad Company	Aerial Company	Miscellaneous or Support Units	Address	Build year
201 (Headquarters)	Pumper 201; Heavy Rescue 201		Air & Light 201; Car 206 (Platoon Chief); Car 209 (District Chief)	8 Rutherford Road South	1973
202	Pumper 202	Aerial 202	Tech Rescue 202	280 Bramalea Road	1985
203	Squad 203		Car 207 (District Chief)	425 Chrysler Drive	1974
204	Pumper 204	Aerial 204	Haz-Mat 204; Car 208 (District Chief)	657 Queen Street West	1977
205	Pumper 205; Squad 205			95 Sandalwood Parkway West	1980
206	Pumper 206; Squad 206			7880 Hurontario Street	1985
207		Pumper 207	Community Response 207; Parade truck	75 Vodden Street East	1989
208		Pumper 208	Aerial 208	120 Fernforest Drive	1994
209	Pumper 209	Aerial 209	Command 209	2691 Sandalwood Parkway East	2001
210		Aerial 210		10530 Creditview Road	2002
211	Pumper 211			10775 The Gore Road	2014
212	Squad 212		Rehab 201	8220 Mississauga Road	2010
213	Squad 213			4075 Ebenezer Road	2003
Pumper 214 (Future Station)				917/927 Bovaird Drive West	2020 (planned)
Apparatus and Maintenance Facility	Pumper 251 (Spare); Pumper 254 (Spare); Pumper 256 (Spare); Pumper 257 (Spare); Pumper 258 (Spare); Pumper 259 (Spare)	Aerial 252 (Spare); Aerial 254 (Spare); Aerial 259 (Spare)	Car 266	52 Rutherford Road South	2017

== See also ==
- Peel Regional Police
- Peel Regional Paramedic Services
