= Little Etobicoke Creek =

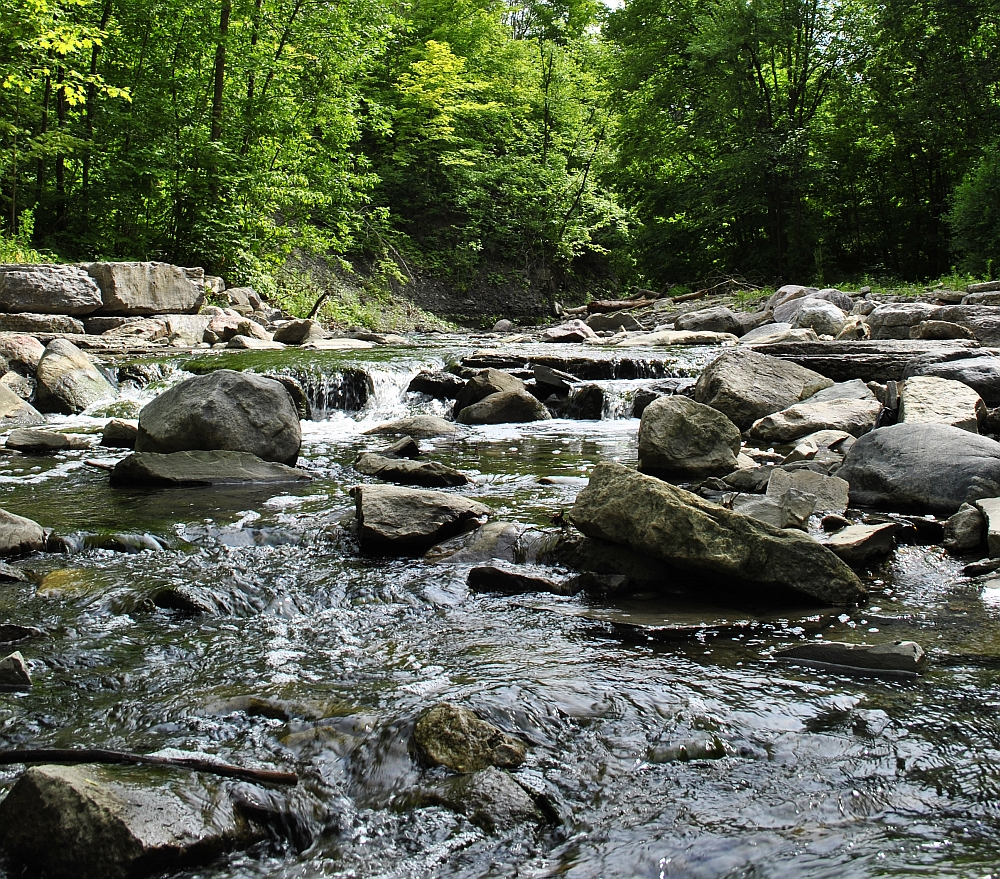
- Little Etobicoke Creek north of The Queensway in Mississauga

- Location of the mouth of Little Etobicoke Creek in southern Ontario

Location
- Country: Canada
- Province: Ontario
- Region: Greater Toronto Area
- Regional Municipality: Peel
- Municipality: Mississauga

Physical characteristics
- Source
  - coordinates: 43°38′50″N 79°39′23″W
  - elevation: 169 m (554 ft)
- Mouth: Etobicoke Creek
  - coordinates: 43°36′37″N 79°34′02″W
  - elevation: 106 m (348 ft)
- Length: 10 km (6.2 mi)

Basin features
- River system: Great Lakes Basin

Little Etobicoke Creek is a small river in Mississauga, Regional Municipality of Peel in the Greater Toronto Area of Ontario, Canada. It is in the Great Lakes Basin and is a right tributary of Etobicoke Creek, which flows to Lake Ontario.

== Course ==
Little Etobicoke Creek emerges from a culvert on the south side of Britannia Road East, just east of Tomken Road. It flows southeast, passing under Highway 401, Eglinton Avenue, Eastgate Parkway, Burnhamthorpe Road and Bloor Street, before briefly heading northeast under Dixie Road. It then returns to a southeast path, passing under Dundas Street and the GO Transit Milton line, and finally turns east to its mouth at Etobicoke Creek just north of the Queensway (Peel Regional Road 20).

== See also ==
- List of rivers of Ontario
