= Peel Regional Paramedic Services =

Emergency service in Ontario, Canada

- Established: 2000
- Headquarters: 1600 Bovaird Drive East, Brampton, Ontario
- Jurisdiction: Regional municipality
- Employees: Almost 700 full- and part-time paramedics work for Peel Regional Paramedic Services.
- Ambulances: 60 ambulances and 8 Rapid Response Units
- Chief: Brian Gibson, Director of Peel Regional Paramedic Services
- Medical director: Dr. Sheldon Cheskes
- Responses: Responds to over 120,000 emergencies each year
- Website: http://www.peelregion.ca/paramedics/

Peel Regional Paramedic Services, provide ambulatory and paramedic care for the municipalities within Peel Region, in Ontario, Canada. Paramedic Headquarters are located in Brampton at 1600 Bovaird Road East, and operations serve the residents of Caledon, Brampton, and Mississauga. Peel Paramedics are overseen by Sunnybrook Centre for Pre-hospital Medicine (SCPM) and Base Hospital Director Sheldon Cheskes. The Paramedics have routinely been involved in ground breaking patient care studies that have revolutionized Emergency Patient Care in the ROC - Resuscitation Outcomes Consortium. ROC is a clinical trial network focusing on research in the area of pre-hospital cardiopulmonary arrest and severe traumatic injury.

== Service issues ==
Peel Paramedics routinely encounter off-load delays at area hospitals due to the volume of patients transported, lengthy wait times at local Emergency Rooms, and the aging population in the Region of Peel.

== Operations ==
Peel Region Paramedics operate in the following geographical entities within Peel Region

- Mississauga, Ontario
- Brampton, Ontario
- Caledon, Ontario

== List of Paramedic stations ==
The following is a list of Paramedic stations as reported by the Region of Peel.

=== City of Mississauga ===
- Stn. 14 - Tomken Reporting and Satellite Station - 6825 Tomken Road, Mississauga
- Streetsville Reporting and Satellite Station - 2492 Thomas Street, Mississauga
- Stn. 00 - Maingate - 5299 Maingate Drive, Mississauga
- Stn. 01 - Tedlo - 2355 Tedlo Street, Mississauga
- Stn. 04/05 - Kitimat - 6810 Kitimat Road, Mississauga
- Stn. 13 - Goreway - 7101 Goreway Drive, Mississauga
- Stn. 15 - Winding Trail - 1355 Winding Trail, Mississauga
- Stn. 20 - Airport - 6375 Airport Road, Mississauga
- 5845 Falborne Street, Mississauga
- 3190 Mavis Road, Mississauga
- 938 East Avenue, Mississauga
- 75 Kingsway Drive, Mississauga
- 1188 Lakeshore Road West, Mississauga

=== City of Brampton ===
- Stn. 19 - Fernforest Reporting and Administration Station - 1600 Bovaird Drive East, Brampton
- Stn. 21 - Rising Hill Reporting and Satellite Station - 25 Rising Hill Ridge, Brampton
- Stn. 08 - Heartlake - 91 Sandalwood Parkway East, Brampton
- Stn. 15 - The Gore - 10775 The Gore Road, Brampton
- Stn. 16 - Victoria - 40 Victoria Drive, Brampton
- Stn. 18 - Exchange - 75 Exchange Drive, Brampton
- 20 Lynch Drive (Peel Memorial Urgent Care Centre), Brampton

=== Town of Caledon ===
- Stn. 10 - Bolton - 28 Ann Street, Caledon
- Stn. 11 - Caledon - 3611 Charleston Side Road, Caledon
- Stn. 12 - Valleywood - 2 Snelcrest Drive, Caledon

== Fleet ==
- 100 Ambulances & Vehicles
  - Type III - Ford & Chevy chassis (3XXX)
  - Type III Tactical
  - Chrysler minivan - Public Education and Outreach
  - Dodge Charger - Platoon Manager
  - Chevy Impala- Administration
  - Ford Expedition- Rapid Response Units
  - Chevy Tahoe- Supervisor Vehicles and Rapid Response units
  - Ford Taurus- Deputy Chief
  - 3 Ford Transit-logistics vehicles

== Power Stretchers ==
The first Stryker Power Pro XT was rolled out in July, 2016. Full fleet installation completed January, 2017.

== Services ==
- Primary Care Paramedics
- Advanced Care Paramedics
- Tactical Paramedic Units
- Rapid Response Units
- Community Paramedics

== See also ==
Paramedicine in Canada

- List of EMS Services in Ontario
- Paramedics in Canada
- Emergency Medical Services in Canada

Emergency Services in Peel Region

- Peel Regional Police
- Brampton Fire and Rescue
- Mississauga Fire and Emergency Services
