= Mississauga restaurant bombing =

2018 crime in Ontario, Canada

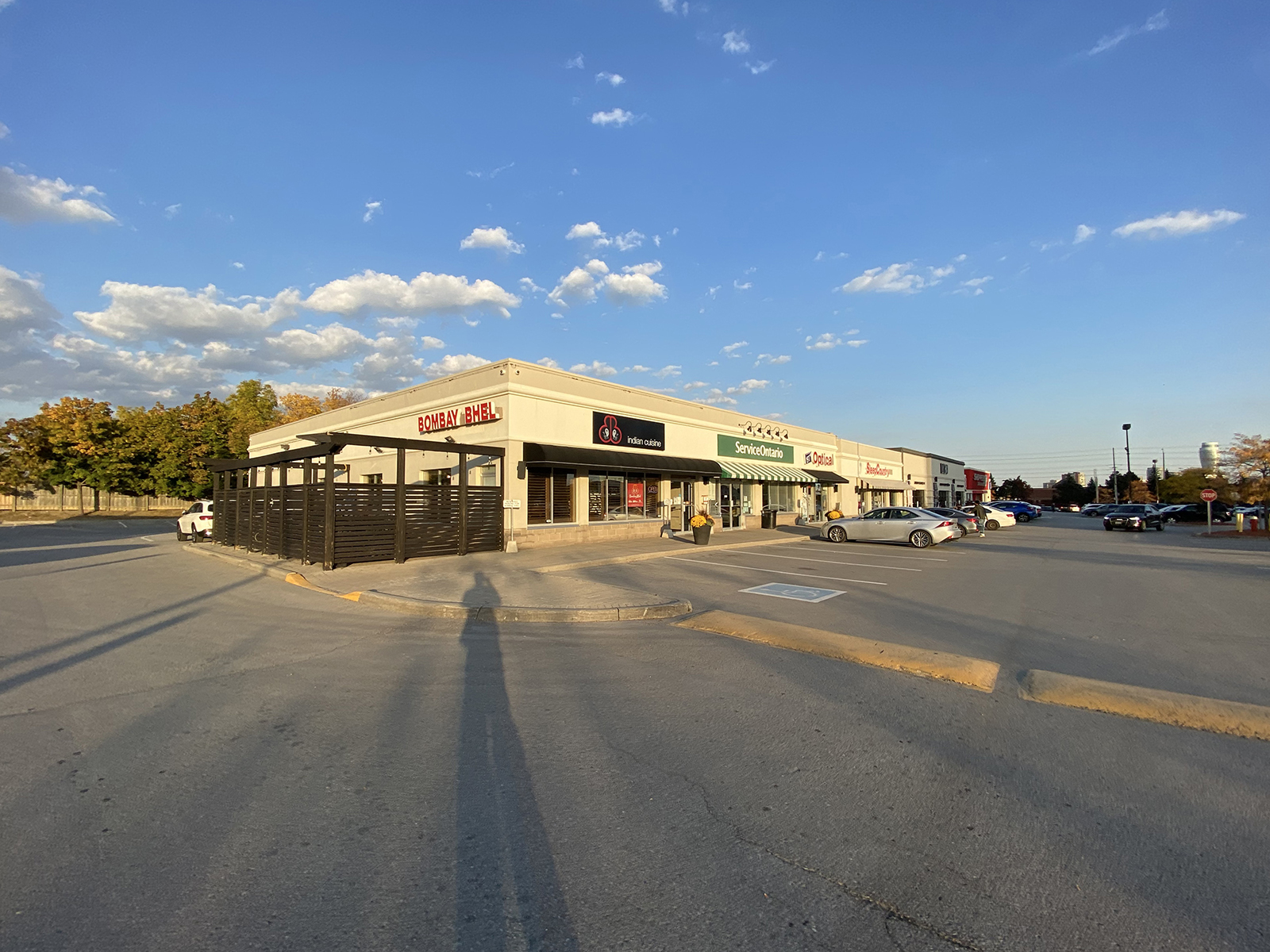
- Bombay Bhel restaurant in 5035 Hurontario Street
- Location: 43.608581°N 79.653517°W; Bombay Bhel; 5035 Hurontario Street; Mississauga, Ontario, Canada
- Date: May 24, 2018; 10:32 pm (EDT)
- Target: Patrons
- Attack type: Bombing
- Weapon: IED
- Deaths: 0
- Injuries: 15

A bombing occurred at the Bombay Bhel restaurant in Mississauga, Ontario, Canada, on May 24, 2018, just before 10:32 pm. The restaurant is located in a shopping plaza along Hurontario Street, the main north–south thoroughfare of Mississauga, at the intersection with Eglinton Avenue.

== Bombing ==
Two people, still at large and unidentified, are suspected of detonating an improvised explosive device inside the flagship location of Bombay Bhel, a regional Indian restaurant chain, injuring 15 of the 40 people inside. The victims were between the ages of 23 and 69, most attending two birthday parties. Three were sent to the trauma centre at Toronto's Sunnybrook Health Sciences Centre in critical condition. They were stabilized and released the next day. Others were treated for minor injuries at the nearby Mississauga Hospital and Credit Valley Hospital.

Peel Regional Police said surveillance photographs show the suspects wearing jeans and dark-coloured hoodies, one with a black cloth over their face. The on-site police investigation ended on May 28. The restaurant's manager said it would remain closed to customers until further notice. On May 29, police announced they believe one suspect may be a woman and that the bomb was very likely homemade.

The restaurant reopened on September 21, 2018 following repairs and renovations, four months after the bombing.

== Reactions ==
Bonnie Crombie, the Mayor of Mississauga, called the attack "heinous" and expressed support for the victims. The bombing was also condemned by the leaders of all three major provincial political parties: Premier of Ontario and Liberal Party leader Kathleen Wynne, Progressive Conservative Party leader Doug Ford, and New Democratic Party leader Andrea Horwath. Prime Minister of Canada Justin Trudeau also condemned the attack and wished a speedy recovery to the victims. Navdeep Bains, the Member of Parliament for Mississauga—Malton (which includes where the bombing occurred), called for the community to come together for support and comfort in the wake of the attack.

Indian Foreign Minister Sushma Swaraj wrote that she and her office are "in constant touch with the Consul General in Toronto and the Indian High Commissioner in Canada" and the diplomatic missions would "work round the clock." Punjab Chief Minister Amarinder Singh issued a statement that condemned the bombing as a "dastardly" attack and added that "the incident, which comes just a month after 10 pedestrians were mowed to death by a van driver in Toronto, has once again highlighted the global dimensions of terrorism."

=== Lawsuit ===
Six of the 15 injured victims of the bombing launched a civil suit against the owners of Bombay Bhel in the Ontario Superior Court of Justice on August 21, 2018. The suit is seeking $1 million per plaintiff in damages and alleges, citing unnamed sources and "rumours about threats in the community", that the owners of the restaurant were in a "turf war" with rival businesses and should have been aware of security threats. Peel Regional Police said in a statement that there was no evidence of threats to the restaurant, its owners, or its staff; and Peel Police "have no information to suggest that this is a turf war".
