= Air Canada Flight 189 =

1978 plane crash of an Air Canada DC-9-32

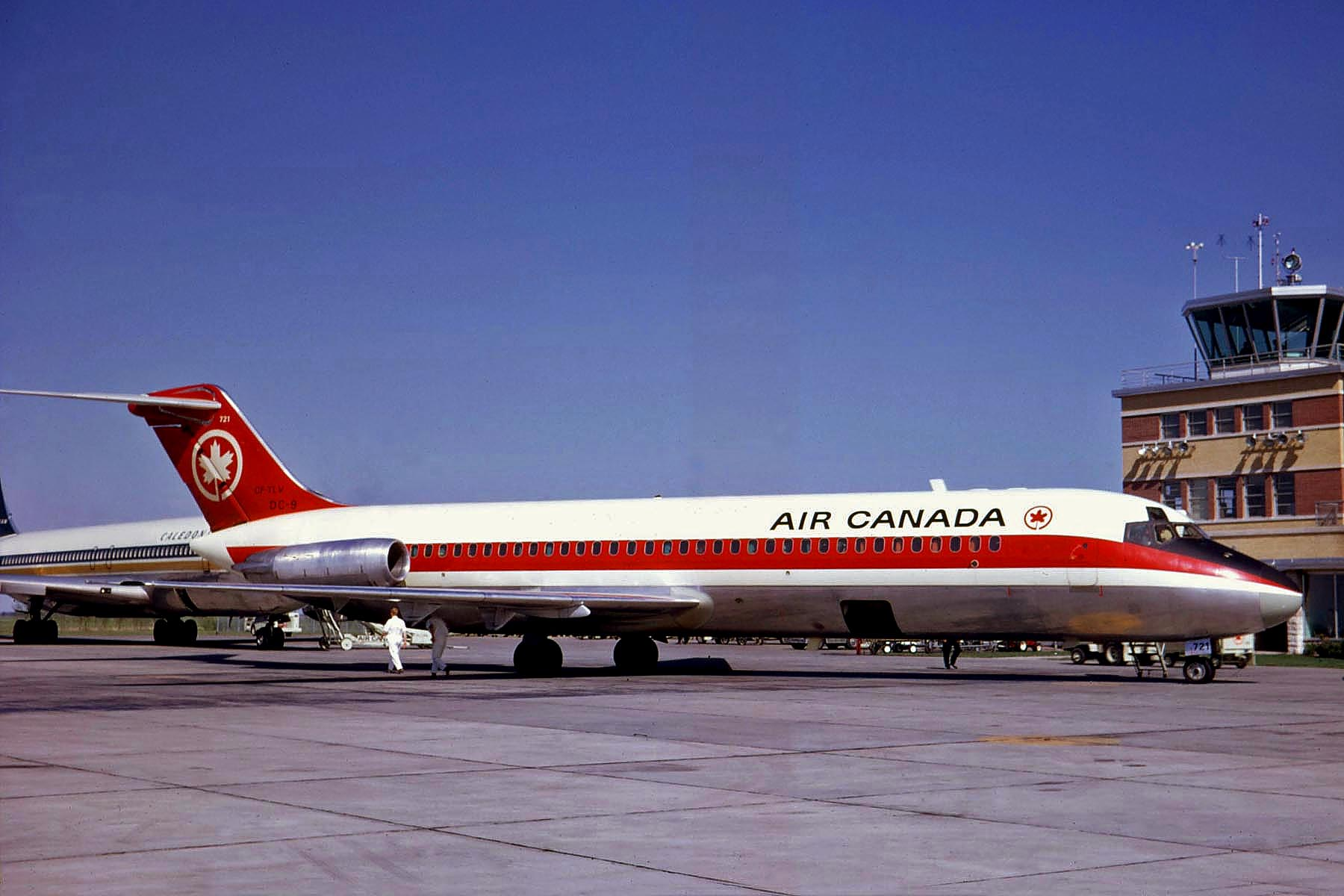
- C-FTLV, the aircraft involved in the crash, in 1969 with a previous registration and livery

Accident
- Date: June 26, 1978
- Summary: Mechanical failure after tire blowout followed by pilot error
- Site: Etobicoke Creek near Toronto International Airport, Toronto, Ontario, Canada; 43°39′35″N 79°37′32″W

Aircraft
- Aircraft type: McDonnell Douglas DC-9-32
- Operator: Air Canada
- IATA flight No.: AC189
- ICAO flight No.: ACA189
- Call sign: AIR CANADA 189
- Registration: C-FTLV
- Flight origin: Toronto International Airport
- Destination: Winnipeg International Airport
- Occupants: 107
- Passengers: 102
- Crew: 5
- Fatalities: 2
- Injuries: 105
- Survivors: 105

Air Canada Flight 189 was a scheduled flight from Ottawa to Vancouver via Toronto and Winnipeg. On June 26, 1978, the McDonnell Douglas DC-9 operating the flight crashed on takeoff in Toronto, killing two passengers; 105 people survived.

== Aircraft ==
The aircraft involved was a McDonnell Douglas DC-9 32 series, with aircraft registration C-FTLV, powered by two Pratt & Whitney JT8D engines. At the time of the incident the aircraft had accumulated 25,476 hours of flight time.

== Accident ==
During takeoff, at 8:15 a.m., one of the McDonnell Douglas DC-9-32's tires burst and partially disintegrated, firing chunks of rubber into the landing gear mechanism. This set off an "unsafe gear" warning, prompting the pilot to abort the takeoff. The aircraft, however, was already two-thirds along the length of runway 23L and travelling at 154 knots (285 km/h). It could not stop before the end of the runway, and plunged off the edge of an embankment while still travelling at 60 knots (110 km/h), coming to a rest in the Etobicoke Creek ravine. The plane broke into three pieces, but despite its full load of fuel did not catch fire. The accident was visible from Highway 401, which runs alongside the south side of the airport.

The plane was destroyed. Two passengers were killed. Both were seated at the site of the forward split in the fuselage. All of the other 105 passengers and crew aboard were injured.

== Investigation ==
The subsequent investigation found multiple causes of the accident. It recommended greater scrutiny be given to the tires. The pilot, Reginald W. Stewart, delayed four seconds after the warning light came on before he chose to abort the takeoff; a more immediate decision would have prevented the accident. The investigators also criticized the level of training in emergency braking. The presence of the ravine at the end of the runway was also questioned, but nothing was done about it. This failure to expand the airport's overshoot zone was raised when Air France Flight 358 plunged into the same ravine 27 years later.

== See also ==
- Air France Flight 358
- TAM Airlines Flight 3054
- Northwest Airlines Flight 255
