= Etobicoke Creek =

River in Greater Toronto, Ontario, Canada

Etobicoke Creek Edoopikaag-ziibi
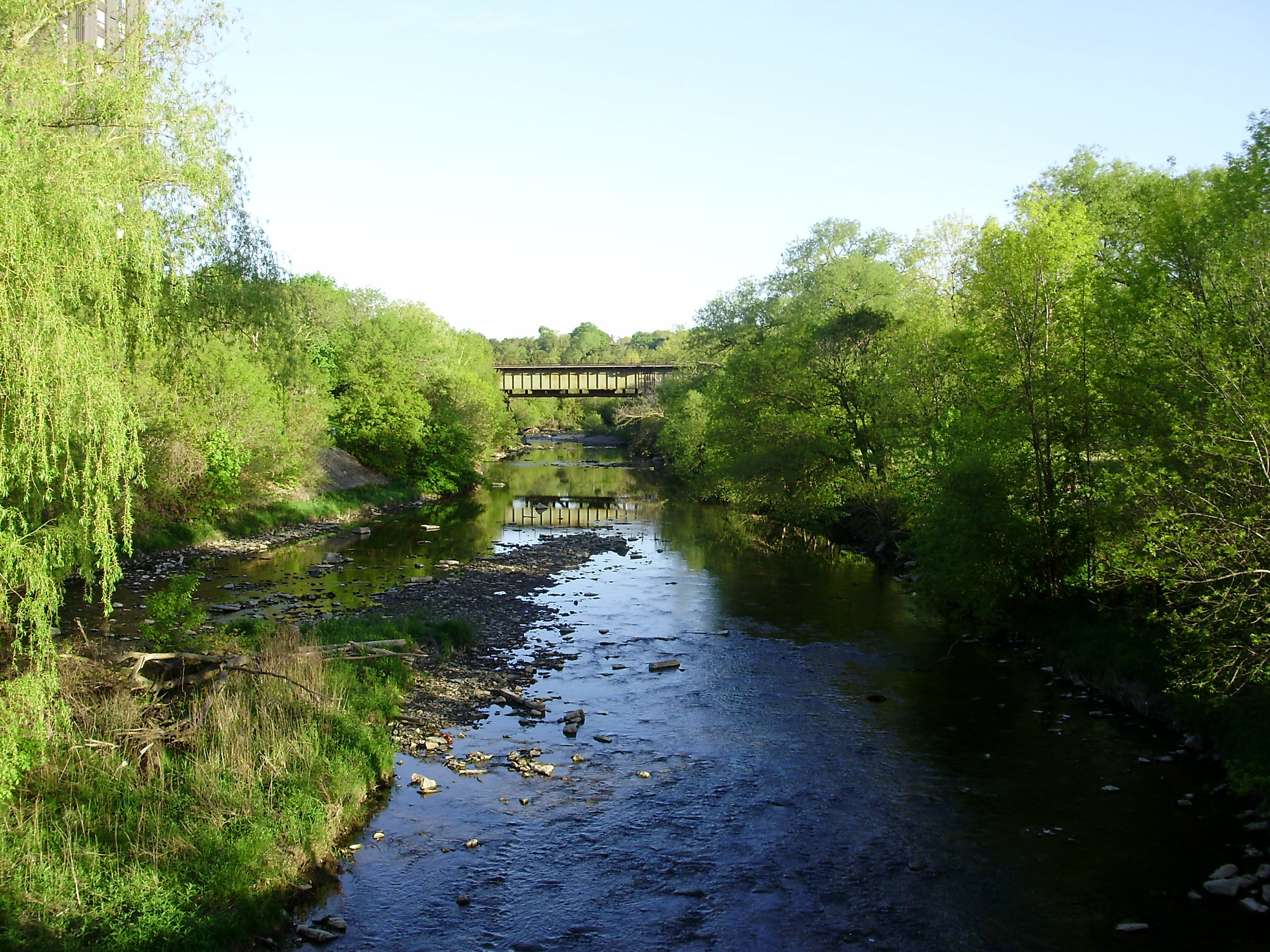
- Looking north up Etobicoke Creek from Lake Shore Boulevard
- Etymology: from the Mississauga word wah-do-be-kang (wadoopikaang)

Location
- Country: Canada
- Province: Ontario
- Region: Greater Toronto Area
- Municipalities: Toronto; Mississauga; Brampton; Caledon

Physical characteristics
- Source
  - location: Caledon, Regional Municipality of Peel
  - coordinates: 43°47′19″N 79°53′39″W
  - elevation: 300 m (980 ft)
- Mouth: Lake Ontario
  - location: Marie Curtis Park, Toronto
  - coordinates: 43°35′05″N 79°32′28″W
  - elevation: 74 m (243 ft)
- Length: 61 km (38 mi)
- Basin size: 211 km^{2} (81 sq mi)
- Discharge
  - average: 0.5 m^{3}/s (18 cu ft/s)

Basin features
- Tributaries
  - left: Spring Creek, Little Etobicoke Creek

Etobicoke Creek /ɛˈtoʊbɪkoʊ/ is a creek in the Greater Toronto Area of Ontario, Canada. It is a tributary of Lake Ontario and runs from Caledon to southern Etobicoke, part of the City of Toronto. The creek is within the jurisdiction of the Toronto and Region Conservation Authority.

== Etymology ==
The name "Etobicoke" was derived from the Mississauga word wah-do-be-kang (wadoopikaang), meaning "place where the alders grow", which was used to describe the area between Etobicoke Creek and the Humber River. The first provincial land surveyor, Augustus Jones, also spelled it as "ato-be-coake". A letter from January 22, 1775 uses "Tobacock". Etobicoke was adopted as the official name of the township (later city, now part of the city of Toronto) in 1795 on the direction of Lieutenant Governor John Graves Simcoe. The name for the waterway used in the Toronto Purchase treaty was Etobicoke River. Simcoe in a memo from April 5, 1796 refers to it as "Smith River or Etobicoke". In a letter dated April 9, 1796 he used "Tobicoke". (No reference appears for Smith but could be linked to Samuel Smith who would be granted land in Etobicoke and served with Simcoe in the Queen's Rangers.) Both "creek" and "river" appear in newspapers and books until about 1960. "Creek" was officially adopted by the Geographical Names Board of Canada on November 18, 1962, though it existed far earlier.

The name of the river in Anishinaabemowin (Ojibwe) language of the Mississaugas, in modern Fiero orthography is Edoopikaag-ziibi.

== Course ==
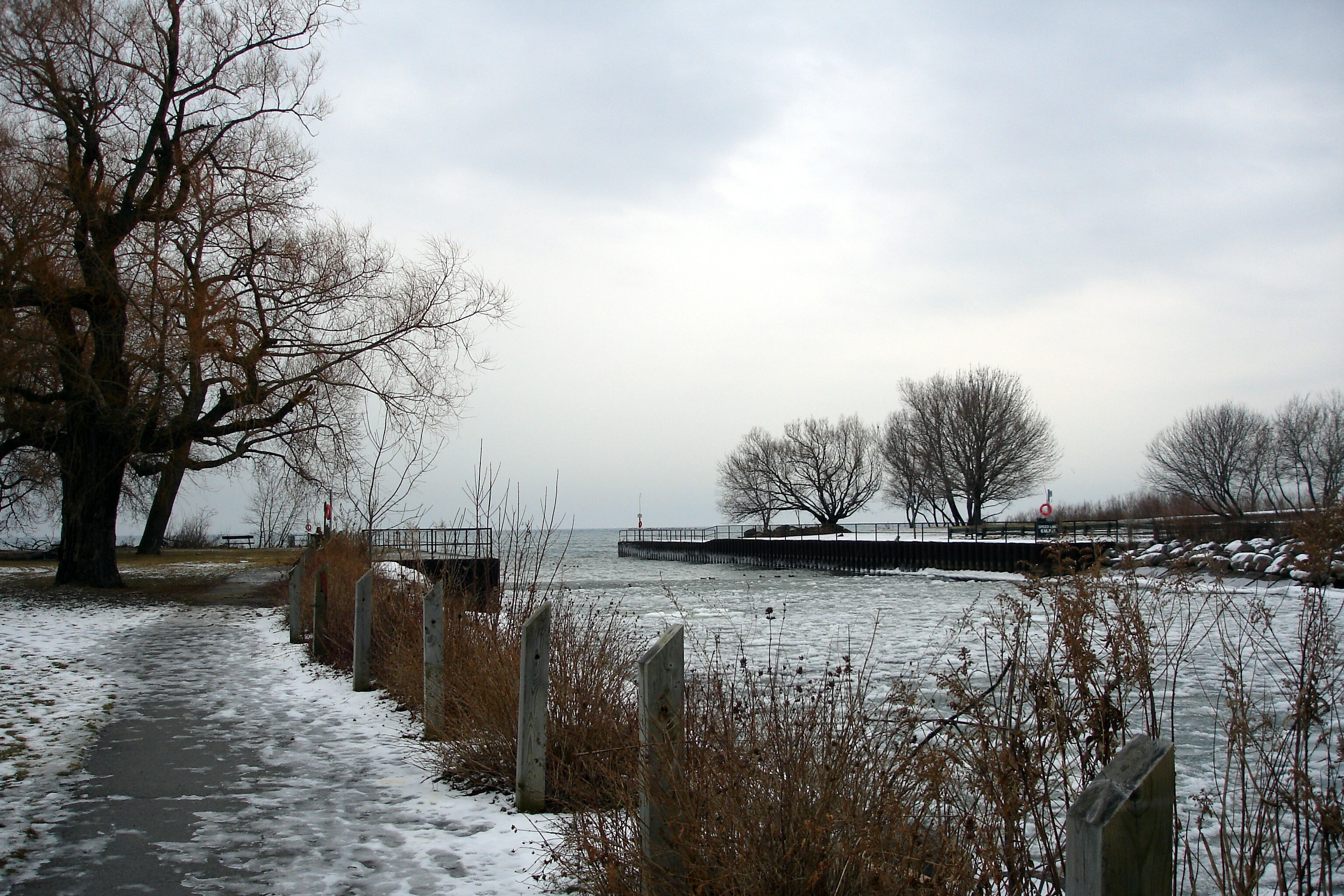
Etobicoke Creek flowing into Lake Ontario, at Marie Curtis Park

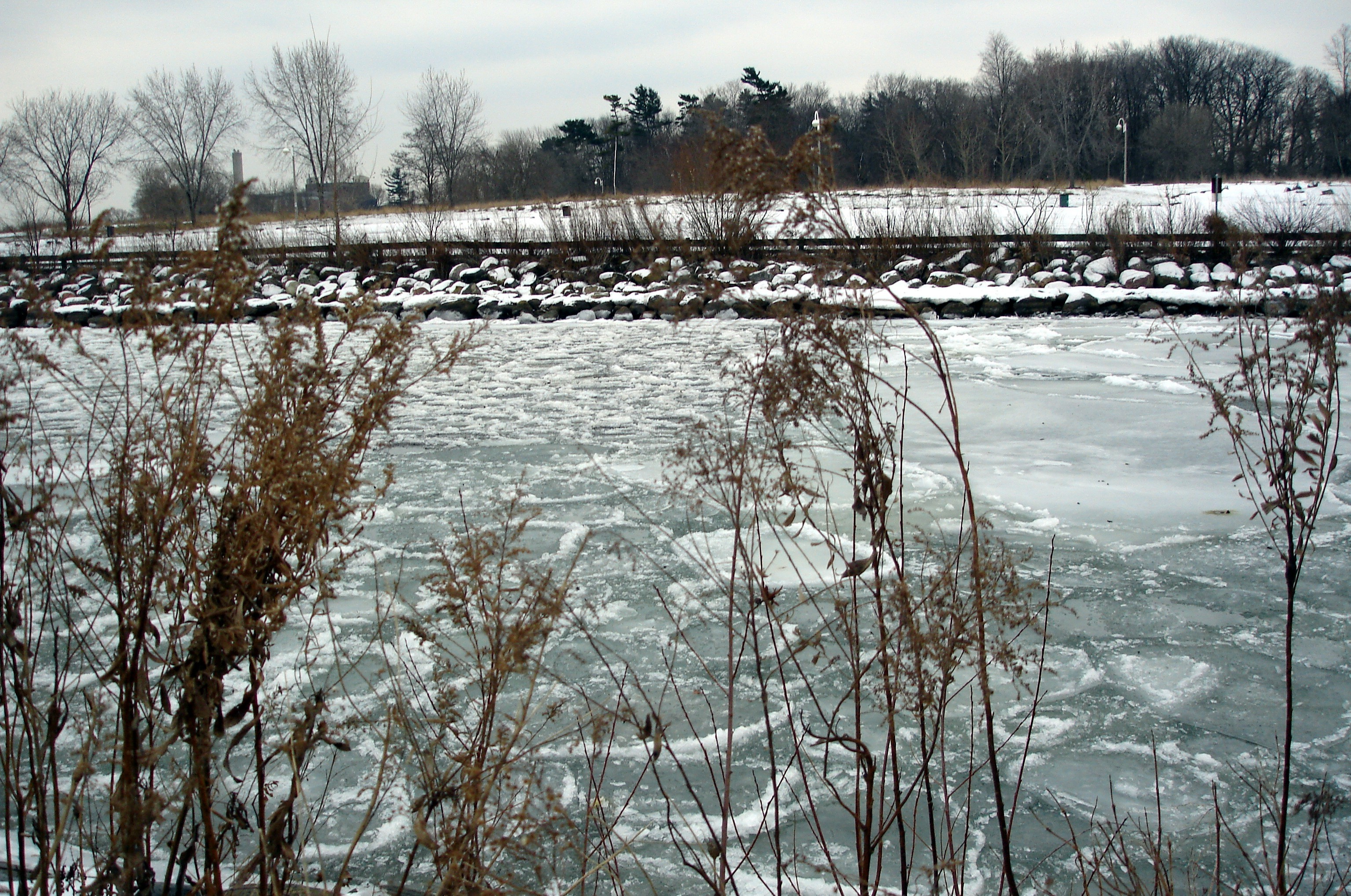
Thawing Etobicoke Creek from Marie Curtis Park

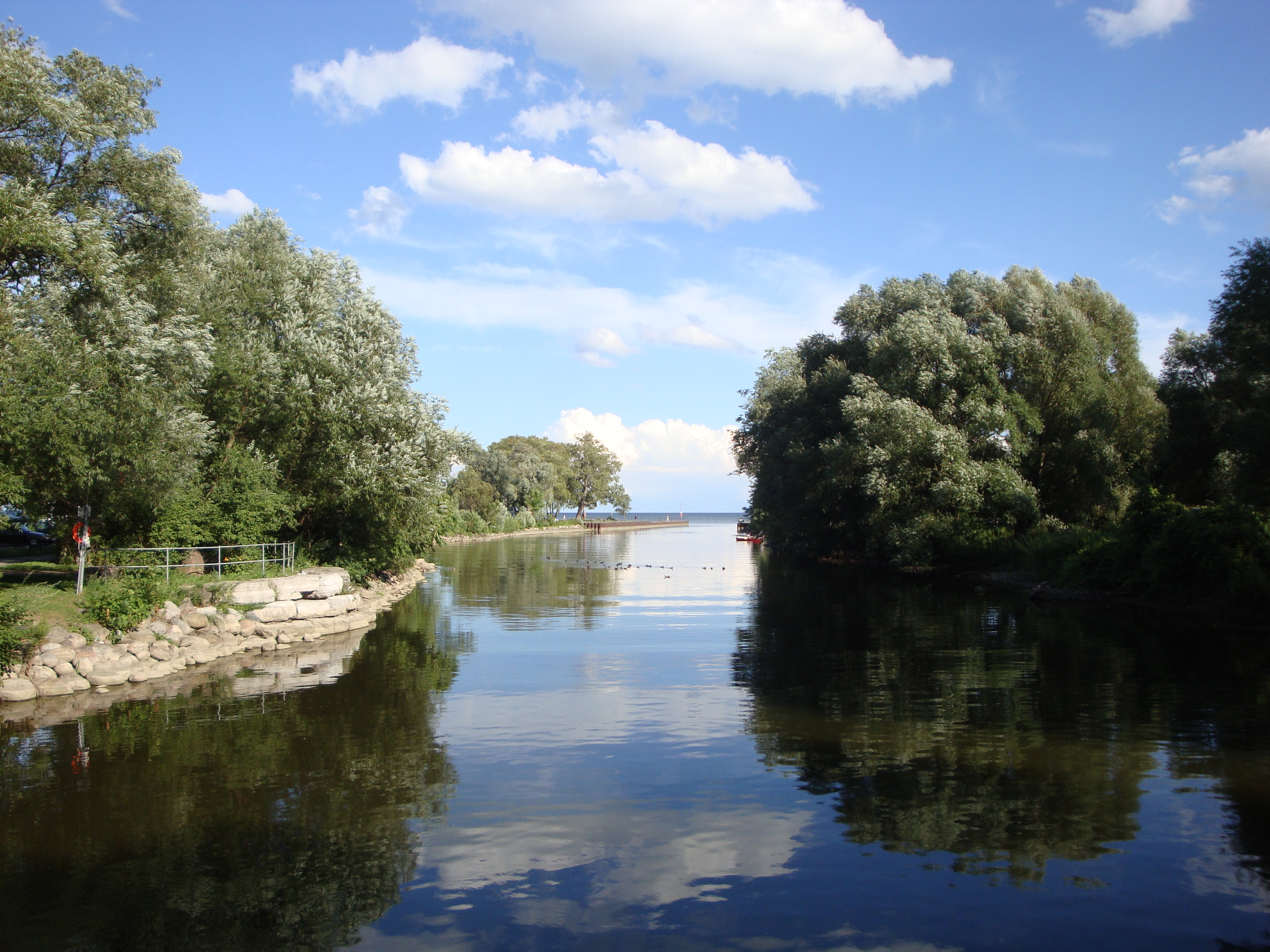
The mouth of the Etobicoke Creek at the Marie Curtis Park

Etobicoke Creek begins south of the Oak Ridges Moraine and flows through Caledon, Brampton, and Mississauga — west of the Toronto Pearson International Airport and the surrounding industrial area — to its mouth at Lake Ontario in the Etobicoke portion of the city of Toronto. The length of the creek is 61 kilometres (38 mi).

== Watershed ==
The creek's southern section forms a city and county-level boundary, separating Toronto on the east from Mississauga, in Peel Region, as far north as Eglinton Avenue (north of where it flows entirely through Peel), on the west. The watershed encompasses 211 square kilometres (81 sq mi). Mean summer waterflow has increased over the period 1967 to 2006 from 3.5 m^{3}/s to 5.0 m^{3}/s (4.5 cu. yd. to 6.5 cu. yd.) as recorded at a measuring station near the river mouth at the Queen Elizabeth Way.

The creek ends in a large recreational area, Marie Curtis Park. It is surrounded by cliffs and the bottom is solid stone, often covered with smaller rocks. It is full of small fish and crayfish, a sign of purity of water.

== Geology ==
The creek is characterized by winding paths ravines and shale banks.

== Incidents ==
=== Aircraft accidents ===
A section of Etobicoke Creek runs close to Toronto's Pearson International Airport, leaving a ravine very close to the west ends of runways 24L and 24R or the beginnings of Runways 6R & 6L. There have been two major aircraft incidents which have resulted in aircraft in the ravine.

- On 26 June 1978, an Air Canada Douglas DC-9-32, Flight 189, with 107 people on board, overshot runway 24R and crashed into the ravine, destroying the aircraft and killing two of the passengers.
- On August 2, 2005, an Air France Airbus A340-300, Flight 358, with 309 people on board, overran runway 24L into the ravine, followed by a fire on board. All people on board escaped safely but dozens were injured. One passenger, Roel Bramar, later commented, "It was a hell of a roller coaster going into the ravine." Although it was widely reported the Air France plane landed in a heavily wooded area, the area is in fact is fairly wide open, due to airport maintenance of both sides of the ravine. The west side of the ravine is a gentle slope, with grass and the airport's light towers for both 6R and 6L. The fact that all on board the aircraft survived led to the incident quickly being referred to as the 'Miracle of Toronto' by press outlets.

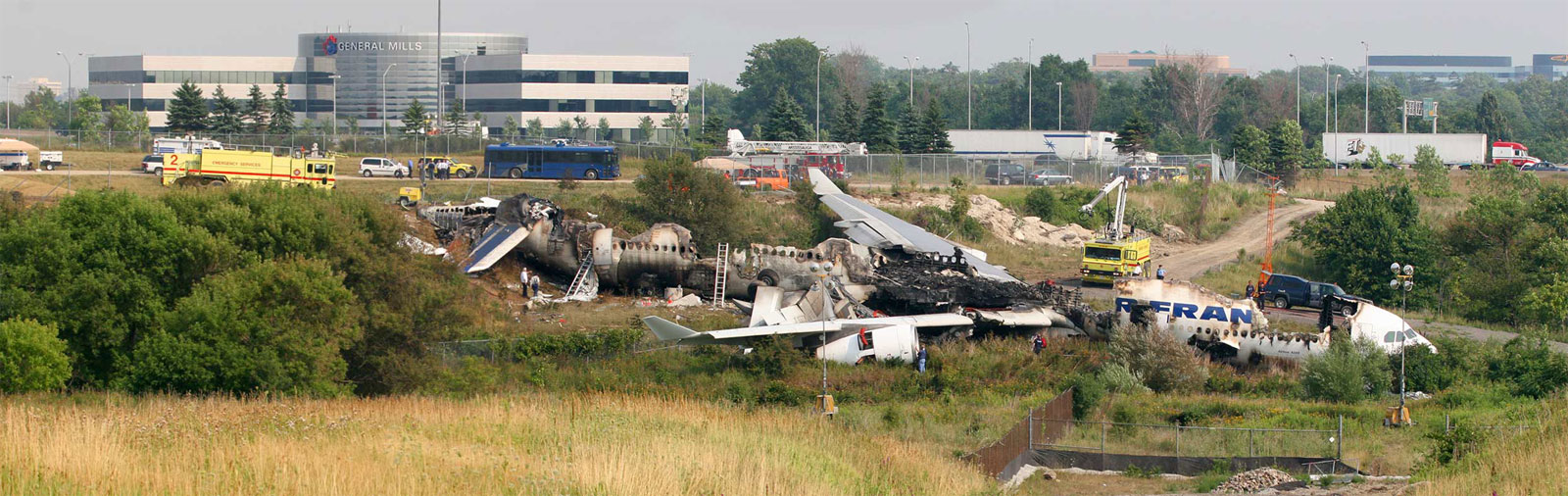
The burnt-out fuselage of Air France Flight 358 after overrunning runway 24L at Toronto Pearson International Airport.

The position of the ravine so close to the airport's overrun area has raised some concerns among the general public, despite Toronto Pearson's compliance with all safety regulations.

=== Spills ===
On March 24, 2020, approximately 400 litres of red ink spilled onto Etobicoke Creek, causing it to turn red.

== Neighbourhoods ==
- Markland Wood is bounded by Etobicoke Creek to the west and Elmcrest (tributary) Creek to the east.
- Alderwood is bounded by Etobicoke Creek to the west.
- Long Branch is bounded on the west by Etobicoke Creek.

== Tributaries ==
- Spring Creek - begins from Etobicoke Creek northwest of the airport northwards between Torbram and Kennedy Roads, to about Bovaird Drive.
- Little Etobicoke Creek
- Elmcrest Creek - small tributary that begins from two ponds inside Etobicoke Centennial Park and flows into Etobicoke Creek in the south at the Markland Wood Golf Club.

Another tributary called Silver Creek was buried during the construction of Malton Airport, which has since become Toronto Pearson International Airport.

== Gallery ==
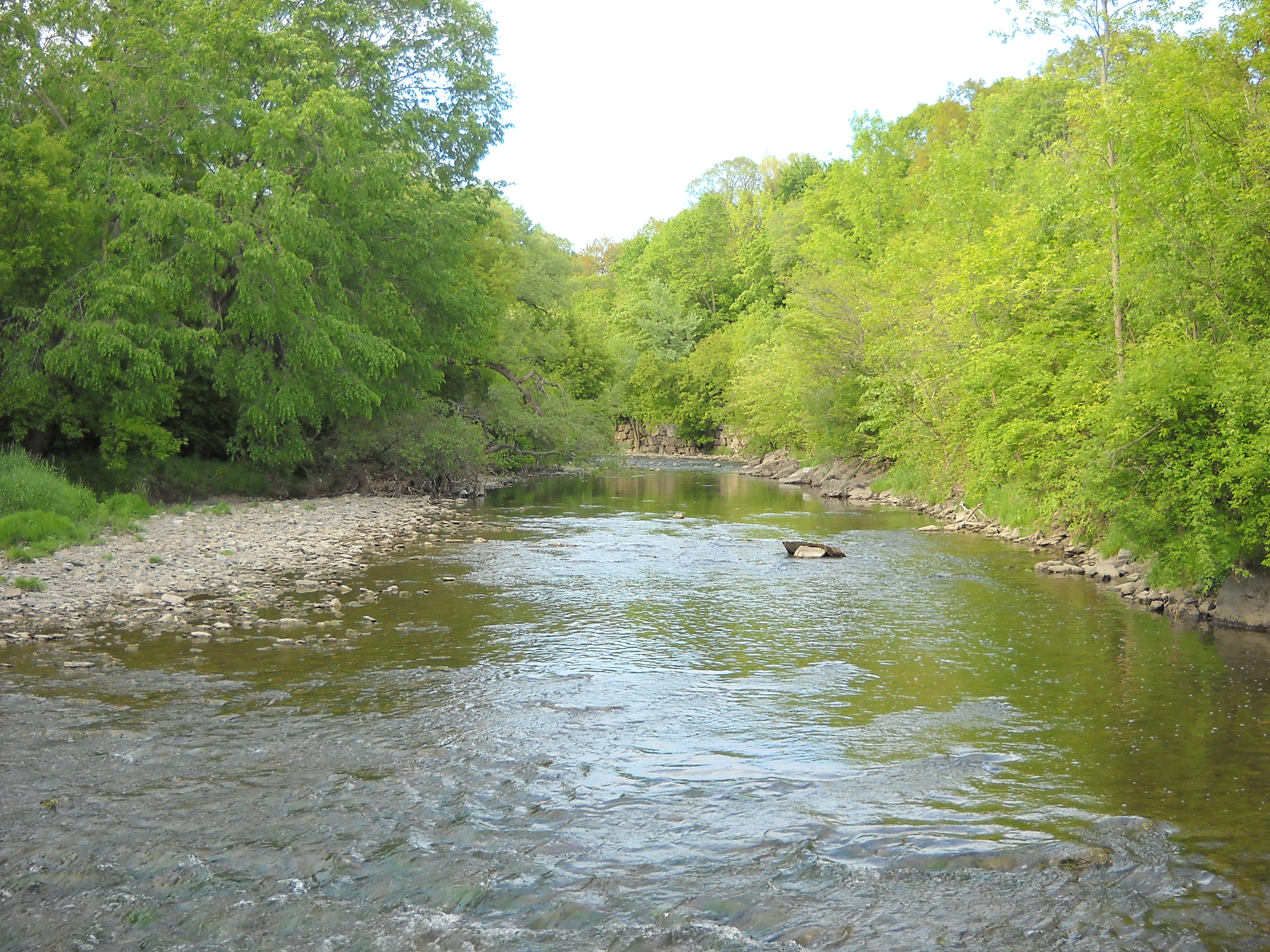
The Etobicoke Creek looking north from the waterfall

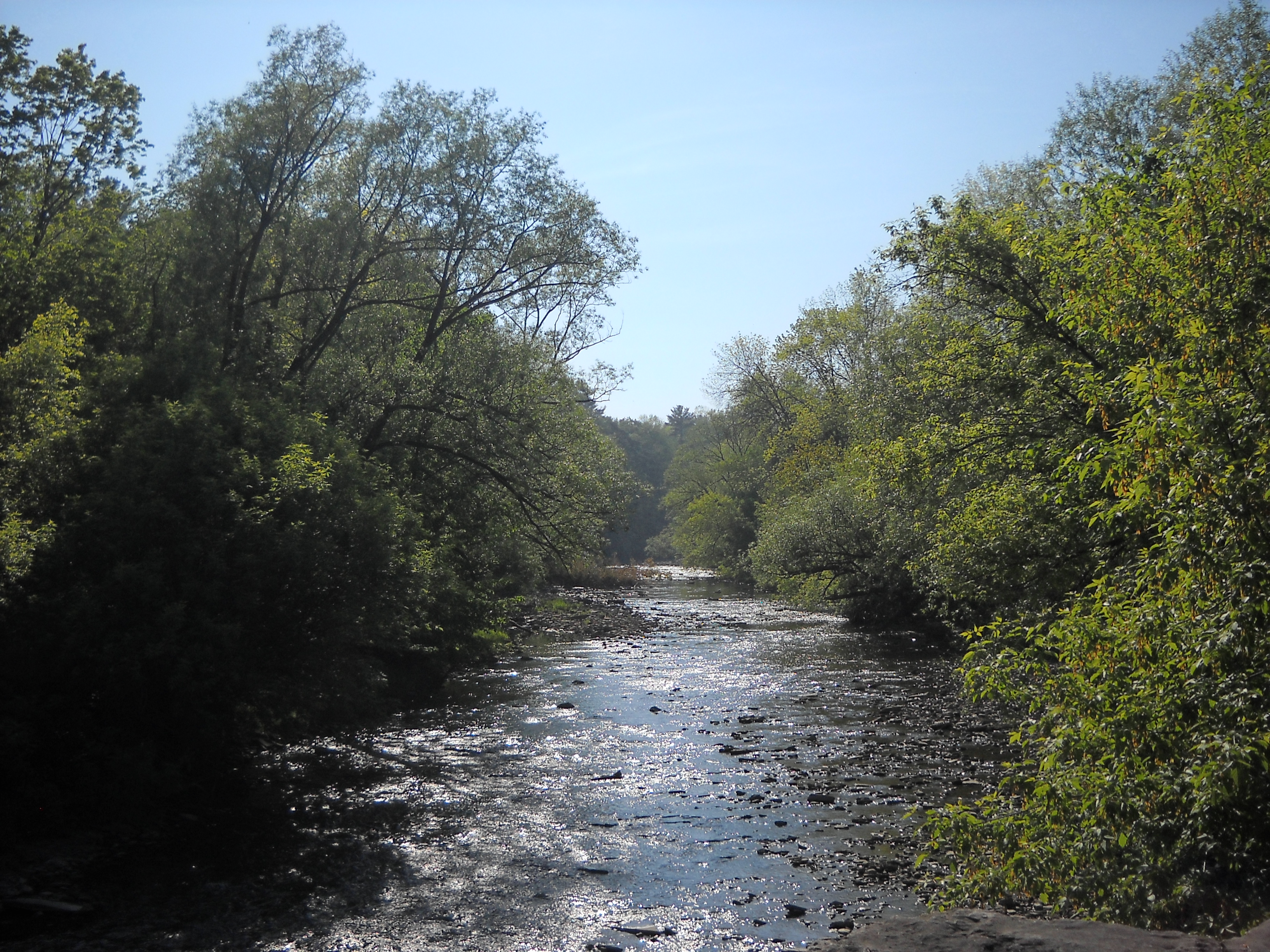
The Etobicoke Creek as it travels south

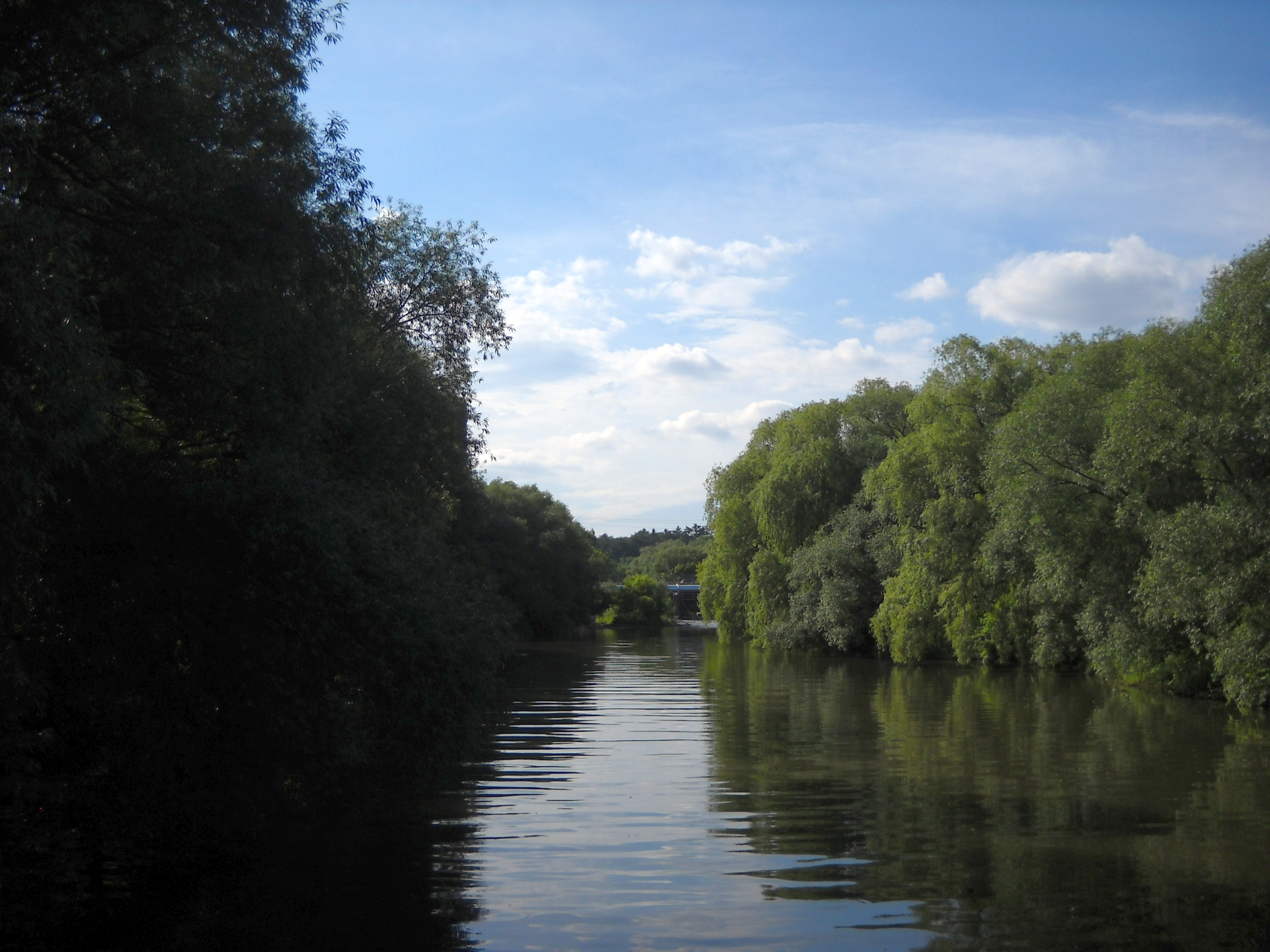
The Etobicoke Creek as it travels through Marie Curtis Park

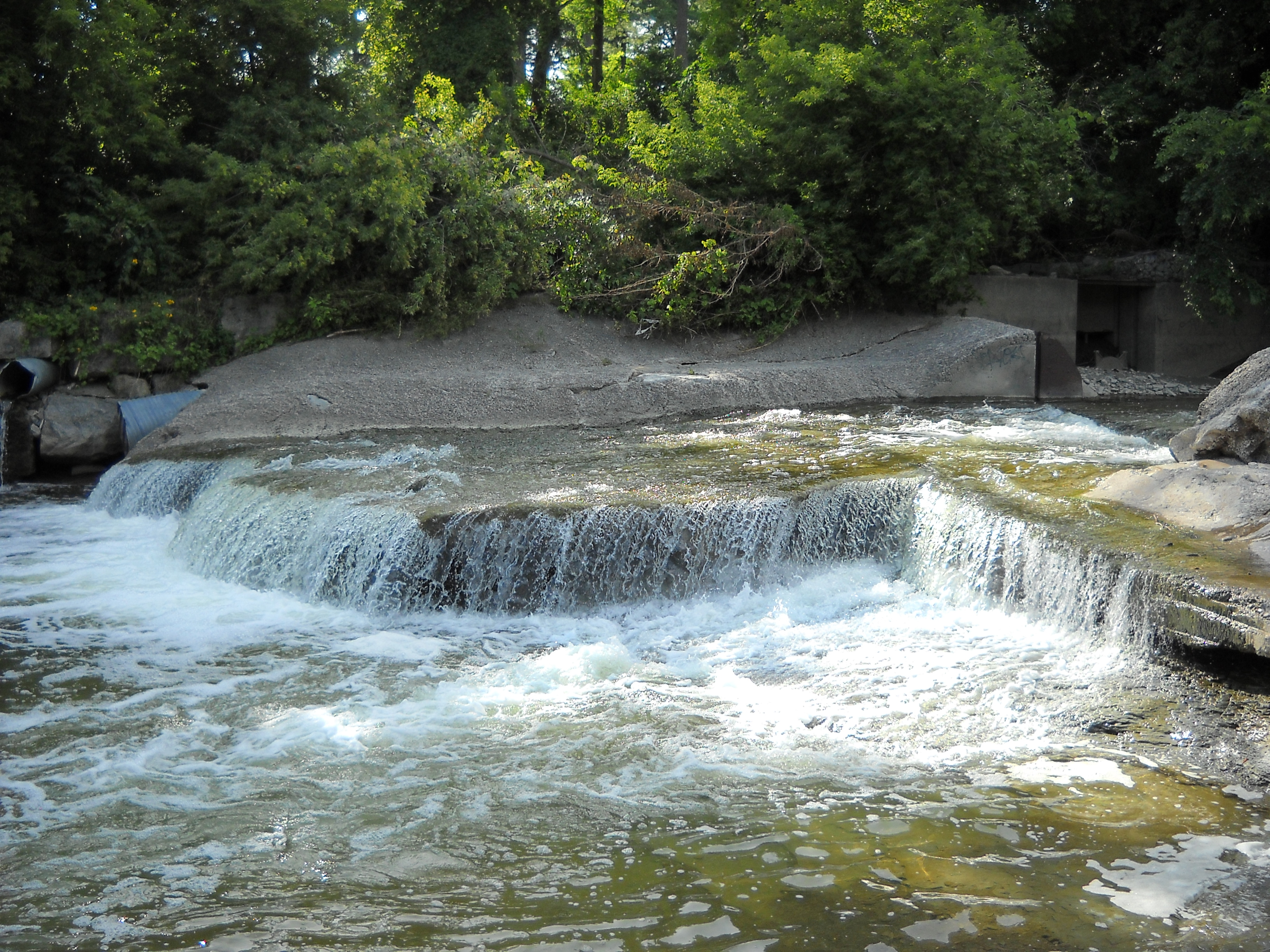
The waterfall in the Etobicoke Creek near the south end of the creek. It is located beside the Toronto Golf Course.

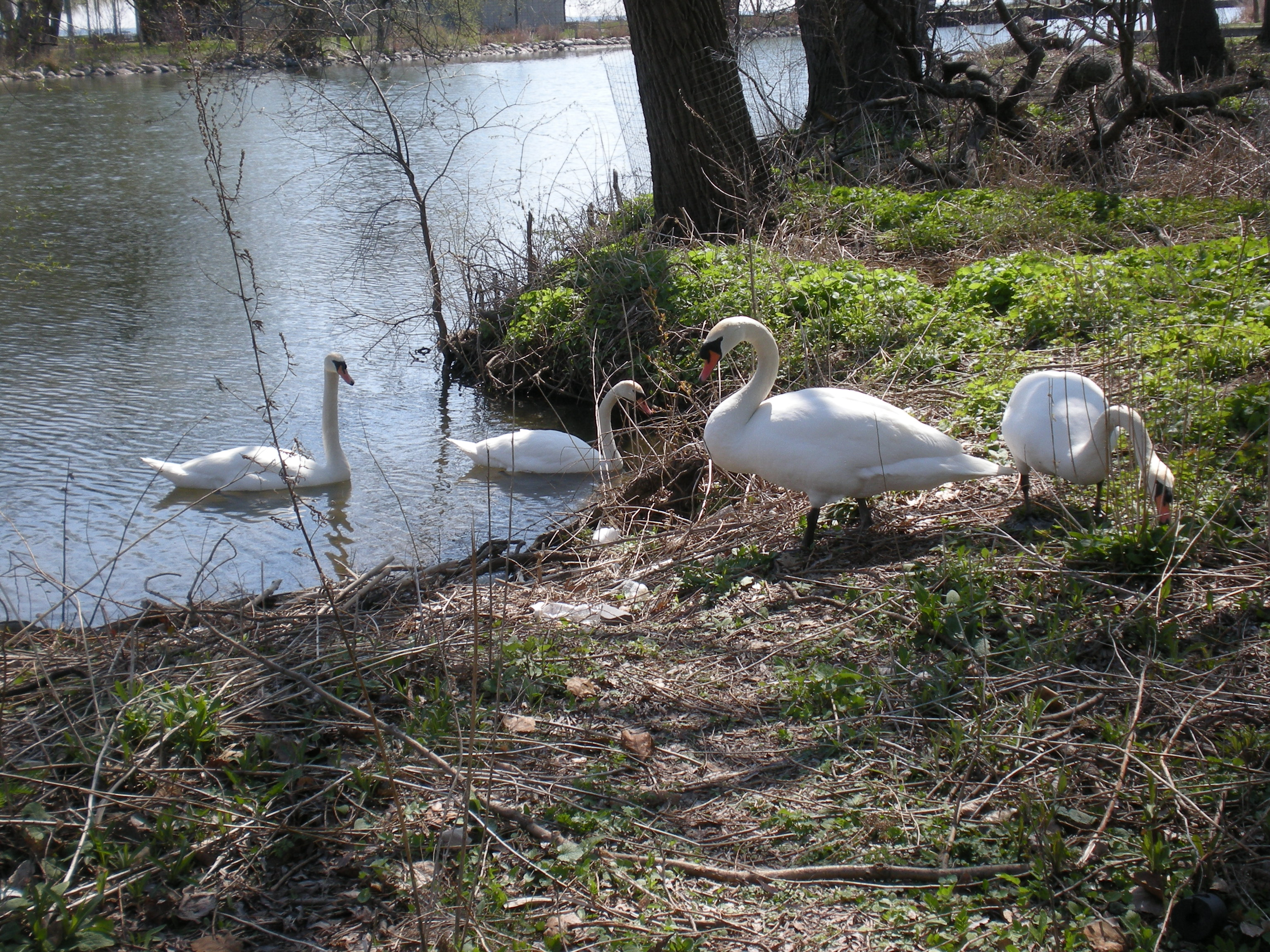
Four mute swans along the bank of the Etobicoke Creek.

== See also ==
- List of rivers of Ontario
